= Odetari discography =

List of works by American singer

- Studio albums: 1
- EPs: 5
- Singles: 46
- Music videos: 44

American singer and songwriter Odetari has released one studio album, five extended plays (EPs), forty-six singles, and forty-four music videos. Born and raised in Houston, Texas, he works for his father who owns a valet parking service. He started producing and releasing SoundCloud rap music at age 13, with a Native Instruments Maschine, and later switching to producing trap beats in 2016.

Odetari's music became popular on TikTok due to his videos of audio deepfakes of video game characters, which used his songs in the background. After getting fired from the high school, he began releasing songs on SoundCloud more frequently and using them in his TikTok videos. His song "Narcissistic Personality Disorder" became his first to chart when it debuted at number 11 on the Billboard Hot Dance/Electronic Songs chart in April 2023; it also became his top-10 debut on the chart the following month.

Odetari has received numerous awards throughout the past two years, including multiple gold certifications. XIII Sorrows was nominated for Top Dance/Electronic Album at the 2024 Billboard Music Awards.

== Studio albums ==
List of studio albums, with release date and label shown
Title	Details
Phazon Varia	Released: September 30, 2026; Label: Artist Partner Group; Format: Digital download, streaming

== Extended plays ==
List of extended plays, with release date and label shown
Title	Details
3×3 (with 9lives)	Released: July 12, 2023; Label: Artist Partner Group; Format: Digital download, streaming
XIII Sorrows	Released: September 13, 2023; Label: Artist Partner Group; Format: LP, Digital download, streaming
Door to Dusk	Released: December 6, 2023; Label: Artist Partner Group; Format: Digital download, streaming
Keep Up // Frostbite	Released: July 17, 2024; Label: Artist Partner Group; Format: Digital download, streaming
Varia 0.5	Released: June 3, 2025; Label: Artist Partner Group; Format: Digital download, streaming

== Singles ==
=== As lead artist ===
List of singles as lead artist, with title, year released, album, and chart positions shown
Title	Year	Peak chart positions							Certifications	Album
Title	Year	US	US Dance	CAN	NZ Hot	UK	UK Dance	WW	Certifications	Album
"Good Loyal Thots"	2023	—	8	—	29	—	—	—	RIAA: Platinum; MC: Gold	XIII Sorrows
"Twilight Lament"	2023	—	—	—	—	—	—	—		Non-album singles
"I <3 Latinas"	2023	—	—	—	—	—	—	—		Non-album singles
"You're Too Slow"	2023	—	29	—	—	—	—	—	RIAA: Gold	Door to Dusk
"Hexxed Her Love <3 XOXO"	2023	—	—	—	—	—	—	—		Non-album single
"Narcissistic Personality Disorder"	2023	—	10	—	—	—	—	—	RIAA: Gold; MC: Gold	XIII Sorrows
"A New Heart"	2023	—	—	—	—	—	—	—		Non-album singles
"Double Trouble"	2023	—	49	—	—	—	—	—		Non-album singles
"Muddy Cup"	2023	—	—	—	—	—	—	—		Non-album singles
"Scorpio" (with Marluxiam)	2023	—	—	—	—	—	—	—		Non-album singles
"Borderline Personality Disorder"	2023	—	—	—	—	—	—	—		Non-album singles
"Red Eyes Black Dragon Chain"	2023	—	—	—	—	—	—	—		Non-album singles
"Throat Goat"	2023	—	—	—	—	—	—	—		Non-album singles
"Look Don't Touch" (with Cade Clair)	2023	—	9	—	—	—	—	—	RIAA: Gold; MC: Gold	XIII Sorrows
"Reassure Me" (with 9lives)	2023	—	—	—	—	—	—	—		3×3
"Wet Dreams" (with Nimstarr)	2023	—	46	—	—	—	—	—		Non-album singles
"Functioning Alcoholic"	2023	—	—	—	—	—	—	—		Non-album singles
"I Love You Hoe" (with 9lives)	2023	— (Note: "I Love You Hoe" did not enter the Billboard Hot 100, but peaked at number 19 on the Bubbling Under Hot 100 chart.)	3	—	18	—	—	—	RIAA: Platinum	3×3 and Door to Dusk
"GMFU" (with 6arelyhuman)	2023	—	5	—	23	—	—	—	RIAA: Platinum	XIII Sorrows and Myspace Addiction
"Baby I'm Home" (with Kanii and 9lives)	2023	—	38	—	—	—	—	—		Door to Dusk
"Green Goblin" (Spotify singles)	2023	—	—	—	—	—	—	—		Non-album single
"Dxe Dxe Dxe" (with Homixide Gang)	2023	—	—	—	—	—	—	—		Door to Dusk
"Purple Heart" (with Don Toliver)	2023	—	—	—	—	—	—	—		Door to Dusk
"Dice and Roll"	2024	—	13	—	—	—	—	—		Non-album singles
"Break a Neck" (with Ayesha Erotica)	2024	—	33	—	—	—	—	—		Non-album singles
"Desire"	2024	—	—	—	—	—	—	—		Non-album singles
"Keep Up"	2024	96	5	65	23	50	9	91	RIAA: Gold	Keep Up // Frostbite
"Frostbite" (with 10zen)	2024	—	—	—	—	—	—	—		Keep Up // Frostbite
"Run!" (with Lay Bankz)	2024	—	—	—	—	—	—	—		Valorant Sounds Vol. 1
"OMG XD"	2024	—	—	—	—	—	—	—		Non-album singles
"Brains Out" (with Artemas)	2024	—	—	—	—	—	—	—		Non-album singles
"Coldest Winter"	2025	—	—	—	—	—	—	—		Non-album singles
"SMB" (with Hongjoong)	2025	—	21	—	—	—	—	—		Non-album singles
"Heavy Love"	2025	—	7	—	—	—	—	—		Varia 0.5
"Dumbo"	2025	—	—	—	—	—	—	—		Non-album single
"Uptown Birds"	2025	—	—	—	—	—	—	—		Varia 0.5
"Never at Ease"	2025	—	—	—	—	—	—	—		Non-album singles
"Error: Soul Not Found (304)" (with Glitch Whisper)	2025	—	—	—	—	—	—	—		Non-album singles
"Out of Bounds"	2025	—	—	—	—	—	—	—		Non-album singles
"Keep Following"	2025	—	—	—	—	—	—	—		Phazon Varia
"Ecstasy"	2025	—	—	—	—	—	—	—		Non-album singles
"Just a Touch"	2025	—	—	—	—	—	—	—		Non-album singles
"Delirium Tremens"	2026	—	—	—	—	—	—	—		Non-album singles
"Color Code"	2026	—	—	—	—	—	—	—		Non-album singles
"Don't Die" (with Soyeon)	2026	—	—	—	—	—	—	—		Non-album singles
"Lipstick"	2026	—	—	—	—	—	—	—		Non-album singles
"Ballad of Blue" (with Zertal)	2026	—	—	—	—	—	—	—		Non-album singles
"Never a Memory"	2026	—	—	—	—	—	—	—		Phazon Varia
"I'm a Blackhole"	2026	—	17	—	—	—	—	—		Phazon Varia
"—" denotes a single that did not chart or was not released.

=== As featured artist ===
List of singles as featured artist, with title, year released, and album shown
Title	Year	Peak chart positions	Album
Title	Year	US Dance	Album
"Level Up!" (6arelyhuman featuring Odetari)	2024	—	Internet Famous
"Multimillionaire" (9lives and Trippie Redd featuring Odetari)	2024	43	Non-album singles
"Tell Me Lies" (Asteria featuring Odetari)	2024	—	Non-album singles
"Up Freestyle" (9lives featuring Odetari)	2025	—	Non-album singles
"Fly" (1nonly and Odetari)	2025	—	Only If I Die, Would I Not Be
"DNA" (RJ Pasin and Odetari featuring 9lives)	2026	—	The Indomitable Human Spirit

== Other charted and certified songs ==
Title	Year	Peak chart positions	Certifications	Album
Title	Year	US Dance	Certifications	Album
"Hypnotic Data"	2023	17	RIAA: Gold	XIII Sorrows
"Door to Dusk"	2023	36		Door to Dusk
"Hypnotic Data" (as Odecore)	2023	34		XIII Sorrows (Odecore Mix)
