= Kanii discography =

- EPs: 7
- Singles: 30+
- Music videos: 60+

The discography of American singer-songwriter Kanii consists of seven extended plays (EPs), and over thirty singles. His music has been released under Warner Records. He has achieved one top-ten album on the Billboard 200 and multiple gold certifications from the Recording Industry Association of America (RIAA).

After beginning his career in 2018, release his first song "So Long", Faiyaz would release another single titled "Aubade" two years later. Later in 2022, Shorter would release "Attachment (She Wanna Love)", which would gain virality on TikTok. In 2023, Kanii would release his debut single "I Know". The track peaked at number 90 on the Billboard Hot 100 and has received a gold certification by the Recording Industry Association of America (RIAA). The following year, Kanii released his debut extended play, Exiit. The EP gained 4,000 equivalent album units within a week of its release, and peaked at number 10 on the Billboard Top Dance Albums.

== Extended plays ==
List of studio albums, with selected chart positions
Title	Album details	Peak chart positions
Title	Album details	Dance Albums
Kaizen	Released: February 22, 2022; Label: Iconic; Format: Digital download, streaming	
Kosia	Released: April 27, 2022; Label: Iconic; Format: Digital download, streaming	
Relieve	Released: May 22, 2022; Label: Iconic; Format: Digital download, streaming	
Lucent	Released: July 21, 2022; Label: Iconic; Format: Digital download, streaming	
Exiit	Released: June 16, 2023; Label: Warner; Format: CD, digital download, LP, streaming	10
It Was Nice Knowing U	Released: November 17, 2023; Label: Warner; Formats: Digital download, streaming	—
#Blue	Released: July 18, 2025; Label: Masked, Warner; Format: Digital download, streaming, CD	—

== Singles ==
List of singles, with selected chart positions and certifications
Title	Year	Peak chart positions						Certifications	Album
Title	Year	US	US R&B/HH	US Elec.	CAN	IRE	UK	Certifications	Album
"Worth Ur While"	2022	—	—	—	—	—	—		Non-album singles
"Attachment (She Wanna Love)" (featuring Bossa)	2022	—	—	—	—	—	—		Non-album singles
"I Know"	2023	90	29	—	50	50	64	MC: Gold; RIAA: Gold	Exiit
"I Know (PR1ISVX Edit)"	2023	—	—	—	—	—	—		Exiit
"Go (Xtayalive 2)" (with 9lives)	2023	—	—	—	—	—	—	RIAA: Gold	Exiit
"Heart Racing" (with Riovaz and Nimstarr)	2023	—	—	—	—	—	—		Exiit
"Sins (Let Me In)"	2023	—	—	14	—	—	—		It Was Nice Knowing U
"Tell Me" (with Riovaz and Nimstarr)	2024	—	—	39	—	—	—		Non-album single
