= XIII Sorrows =

EP by Odetari
- Released: September 13, 2023
- Studios: Artist Partner Group (Los Angeles, California)
- Genres: Hyperpop; EDM
- Length: 16:03
- Label: Artist Partner Group
- Producers: Giomadx; Odetari

Odetari chronology
3x3 (2023)	XIII Sorrows (2023)	Door to Dusk (2023)

Singles from XIII Sorrows
- 1. "Good Loyal Thots" Released: March 15, 2023; 2. "Narcissistic Personality Disorder" Released: April 1, 2023; 3. "Look Don't Touch" Released: May 17, 2023; 4. "GMFU" Released: July 26, 2023

XIII Sorrows is the debut extended play (EP) by the American rapper Odetari. The album was released on September 13, 2023, through Artist Partner Group, as a follow-up to his collaborative EP, 3x3 (2023). The EP features guest appearances from 6arelyhuman, Cade Clair, and Jeleel. In contrast to the sound of his previous studio album, XIII Sorrows revisits the electronic style of 3x3 (2023) while incorporating elements of electronic dance music.

XIII Sorrows is an electronic dance music EP that contains subtle elements of hip-hop and jersey club. XIII Sorrows was supported by four singles, all of which charted and were certified gold. Consisting of eleven tracks and a duration of around sixteen minutes, the production was handled by Odetari and Giomadx, with Odetari being the sole songwriter. Upon its release, it received generally favorable reviews from critics and was certified gold by the Polish Society of the Phonographic Industry (ZPAV).

== Background and recording ==
After getting fired from his job as a high school teacher, Taha Othman Ahmad a.k.a. Odetari began releasing songs on SoundCloud and frequently used them in his videos on the social media platform TikTok. His music later became popular on TikTok due to his videos of audio deepfakes of video game characters. Odetari would then release his collaborative extended play (EP), 3x3, with 9lives. He then began working on new material and recorded XIII Sorrows at the Artist Partner Group studio in Los Angeles, California. Odetari had named the EP after the Japanese video game franchise Kingdom Hearts group Organization XIII.

== Composition ==
XIII Sorrows is an electronic dance music album that incorporates elements of hip-hop, hyperpop, and jersey club. Critics felt that the EP had explored themes of "braggadocious disaffection". The project features guest appearances from 6arelyhuman, Cade Clair, and Jeleel, with production being handled by Odetari and Giomadx, and the former being the sole songwriter.

== Release and reception ==
Professional ratings
Review scores
Source	Rating
The Journal	7/10
RapReviews	7/10

XIII Sorrows' lead single "Good Loyal Thots" released on March 15, 2023. It was then followed by "Narcissistic Personality Disorder" on April 1, 2023, "Look Don't Touch" on May 17, 2023, and the final single "GMFU" released two months later on July 26, 2023. The singles gained virality, charted on the US Hot Dance/Electronic Songs chart, and were also certified gold by the Recording Industry Association of America (RIAA). The album itself would gain traction following a surge of virality on TikTok, and received a gold certification from the Polish Society of the Phonographic Industry (ZPAV).

Jacob Saltzberg of Earmilk had said that the project was "an invigorating project that keeps the listener on their toes with its diverse sound palette and undercurrent of intensity." Liliana Parsons at The Journal would give the record a 7/10, writing that "I recommend this album to anyone who's looking for exciting and fun music to listen to. Many people criticize the album because of its popularity on TikTok, but I think people should put their preconceived notions aside and give this album a listen." Steve 'Flash' Juon of RapReviews said, "But my ears have been boxed by XIII Sorrows and instead of feeling mad about it [I'm] ready to go five more rounds." XIII Sorrows would be nominated for Top Dance/Electronic Album at the 2024 Billboard Music Awards.

=== Accolades ===
Awards and nominations for XIII Sorrows
Award	Year	Category	Result	Ref.
Billboard Music Awards	2024	Top Dance/Electronic Album	Nominated	

== Track listing ==
XIII Sorrows track listing
No.	Title	Lyrics	Music	Producer(s)	Length
1.	"Hypnotic Data"	Taha Ahmad	Ahmad	Odetari	2:08
2.	"GMFU" (featuring 6arelyhuman)	Ahmad; Toby Hamilton	Ahmad; Hamilton	Odetari	2:07
3.	"Look Don't Touch" (featuring Cade Clair)	Ahmad; Kameron Watts-White	Ahmad; Watts-White	Odetari; Giomadx	2:07
4.	"Me N U Date"	Ahmad	Ahmad	Odetari	2:02
5.	"Good Loyal Thots"	Ahmad	Ahmad	Odetari	1:43
6.	"Hyper Fang" (featuring Jeleel)	Ahmad; Abdul Yussuf	Ahmad; Yussuf	Odetari	1:57
7.	"Get Up Off Me"	Ahmad	Ahmad	Odetari	1:57
8.	"Narcissistic Personality Disorder"	Ahmad	Ahmad	Odetari	1:51
Total length:					16:03

== Personnel ==
Credits adapted from Tidal.

- Taha Ahmad – composing, vocals, songwriting, production
- Toby Hamilton – composing, vocals, songwriting
- Matthew O'Neil – engineering, studio personnel
- Giomadx – production (track 3)
- Kamoren White – vocals, songwriting (track 3)
- Jeleel Yussuf – composing, vocals, songwriting (track 6)

== Certifications and sales ==
Certifications and sales for XIII Sorrows
Region	Certification	Certified units/sales
Poland (ZPAV)	Gold	10,000^{‡}
^{‡} Sales+streaming figures based on certification alone.

== Release history ==
Release dates and formats for XIII Sorrows
Region	Date	Format(s)	Version	Label	Ref.
Various	September 13, 2023	Digital download; streaming; vinyl LP	XIII Sorrows	Artist Partner Group	
Various	September 18, 2023	Digital download; streaming	XIII Sorrows (Odecore Mix)	Artist Partner Group	
