= Cade Clair =

American rapper, singer-songwriter, and record producer

- Born: Kamoren Watts-White; July 4, 2001 (age 24); United States
- Genres: Sigilkore; trap; Jersey club; hyperpop
- Occupations: Rapper; singer-songwriter; record producer
- Years active: 2022–present
- Label: 25/7 Records

Kamoren White, known professionally as Cade Clair, is an American rapper, singer-songwriter, and record producer. He is known for the tracks "Shake That Shit" with Jnhygs, "Let Me See Ya Move" with Lumi Athena, the remix of "Smoke It Off", and "Look Don't Touch" with Odetari. Several of these songs gained popularity on TikTok, with "Look Don't Touch" earning a gold certification from the Recording Industry Association of America (RIAA).

== Career ==
"Look Don't Touch" peaked at number 9 on the Billboard Hot Dance/Electronic Songs chart and received certifications from multiple music industry associations. A month later, "Shake That Shit!" with Jnhygs also became a commercial success, peaking at number 43 and remaining on the chart for over 10 weeks.

== Discography ==
=== EPs ===
| Title | Details |
|---|---|
| BEFORE THE AFTERS | Released: April 4, 2025; Label: 25/7 Records; Format: Digital download, streaming |

=== Singles ===
List of singles as lead artist, with title, year released, album, and chart positions shown
| Title | Year | Peak chart positions | Certifications | Album |
| Title | Year | US Dance | Certifications | Album |
|---|---|---|---|---|
| "Let Me See Ya Move!" (with Cade Clair) | 2023 | 28 | | Non-album singles |
| "Look Don't Touch" (with Odetari) | 2023 | 10 | RIAA: Gold; MC: Gold; PMB: Gold; ZPAV: Gold | Non-album singles |
| "Shake That Shit!" (with jnhygs) | 2023 | 43 | | Non-album singles |
| "4EVR" | 2023 | — | | Non-album singles |
"—" denotes a single that did not chart.

=== Singles ===
- Smoke It Off! (2022)
- Young and Reckless (2023)
- Let Me See Ya Move (2023)
- Gah Dam (2023)
- Look Don't Touch (2023)
- Eye On You (2024)
- Reciprocate (2023)
- Call Me (2024)
- 4EVR (2024)
