= GMFU (song) =

2023 single by Odetari featuring 6arelyhuman

Single by Odetari and 6arelyhuman

from the EP XIII Sorrows and Myspace Addiction
- Released: July 26, 2023
- Genre: Hyperpop
- Length: 2:07
- Label: Artist Partner Group
- Songwriters: Taha Ahmad; Toby Hamilton
- Producer: Odetari

Odetari singles chronology
"Fuck Them Kids" (2023)	"GMFU" (2023)	"Baby I'm Home" (2023)

6arelyhuman singles chronology
"Ur Vampire" (2023)	"GMFU" (2023)	"Blow Up!" (2023)

Music video
- "GMFU" on YouTube

Audio sample
- Odetari – "GMFU": file; help

"GMFU" (an acronym for "Got Me Fucked Up") is a song by American singers, Odetari and 6arelyhuman, from the former's extended play (EP) XIII Sorrows and the latter's EP Myspace Addiction (2023). Written by both performers, it was described by critical commentary as a "dark" and "eccentric" anthem. It was released as the second single promoting the aforementioned projects of both performers on July 26, 2023, through Artist Partner Group. "GMFU" peaked at number five on the US Billboard Dance/Electronic Songs chart, becoming Odetari's fourth and 6arelyhuman's first top-ten entry on the survey. It received a gold certifications from the Recording Industry Association of America (RIAA) and Polish Society of the Phonographic Industry (ZPAV).

== Background and release ==
Odetari released his debut single Good Loyal Thots, in early 2023. The song went viral on TikTok, and gained him a global fanbase and had received widespread critical acclaim. Jon Caramanica of The New York Times would include "Good Loyal Thots" in his list of the best songs of 2023. Odetari later went on to release his collaborative extended play (EP) with 9lives, 3x3, in July 2023. Miggy had directed the music video for "GMFU", which premiered on the same day of release as Odetari's extended play (EP) XIII Sorrows.

== Composition and reception ==
"GMFU" is 2 minutes and 7 seconds long. It was written by Odetari and 6arelyhuman, with the former handling the production. Billboard's Katie Bain proclaimed it as a "dark, thumping anthem about 'going dumb' from partying". Jacob Saltzberg from Earmilk said that XIII Sorrows is given character by "raw, hyperactive synth layers [...] with the eccentric bounce of 'GMFU'". Craig Lindsey from Chron noted that the track is "much beloved [by] children" and follows the trope of Odetari's "vulgar [and] eye-chatching" song titles.

== Commercial performance ==
In the United States, "GMFU" debuted on number 27 on Billboard-curated Hot Dance/Electronic Songs chart on chart issue August 5, 2023. After twelve consecutive weeks of charting, it reached a peak at number five, becoming Odetari's fourth, and 6arelyhuman's first, top ten entry. On January 8, 2024, Billboard reported that the song amassed 91.9 million on-demand streams in the country since its release. The song was certified platinum by Recording Industry Association of America (RIAA) on July 9, 2025, for shipping 1,000,000 copies in the US. Elsewhere, the single entered New Zealand Hot Singles chart at number 35 on chart issue August 3, 2023, peaking at number 23 the following week. In Poland, "GMFU" received gold status by selling 25,000 copies. Meanwhile the song would also receive a platinum certification in Brazil from selling 40,000 copies.

== Credits and personnel ==
Credits adapted from Tidal.

- Odetari – vocals, songwriting, production
- 6arelyhuman – vocals, songwriting

== Charts ==
=== Weekly charts ===
Weekly chart performance for "GMFU"
Chart (2023–2024)	Peak position
New Zealand Hot Singles (RMNZ)	23
US Hot Dance/Electronic Songs (Billboard)	5

=== Year-end charts ===
2023 year-end chart performance for "GMFU"
Chart (2023)	Peak position
US Hot Dance/Electronic Songs (Billboard)	25

2024 year-end chart performance for "GMFU"
Chart (2024)	Peak position
US Hot Dance/Electronic Songs (Billboard)	44

== Certifications ==
Certifications for "GMFU"
Region	Certification	Certified units/sales
Brazil (Pro-Música Brasil)	Platinum	40,000^{‡}
Poland (ZPAV)	Gold	25,000^{‡}
United States (RIAA)	Platinum	1,000,000^{‡}
^{‡} Sales+streaming figures based on certification alone.
