= Door to Dusk =

EP by Odetari
- Released: December 6, 2023
- Genre: Hip-hop
- Length: 24:09
- Label: Artist Partner Group
- Producer: Odetari; 9lives; Lilswirll

Odetari chronology
XIII Sorrows (2023)	Door to Dusk (2023)	Keep Up // Frostbite (2024)

Singles from Door to Dusk
- 1. "You're Too Slow" Released: May 18, 2023; 2. "I Love You Hoe" Released: July 12, 2023; 3. "Baby I'm Home" Released: August 16, 2023; 4. "Dxe Dxe Dxe" Released: November 8, 2023

Door to Dusk is the second extended play (EP) by American singer and rapper Odetari, released on December 6, 2023, through Artist Partner Group, with distribution from Universal Music Group. Consisting of eleven tracks and a duration of around twenty-four minutes, it was entirely produced by Odetari, who was accompanied by 9lives and Lilswirll. The album contains guest appearances from Kamo2700, Don Toliver, Jnhygs, Kanii, Removeface and Wolfacejoeyy. The album was supported by four singles: "You're Too Slow", "I Love You Hoe", "Baby I'm Home", and "Dxe Dxe Dxe".

== Background and recording ==
Odetari was fired from his job as a teacher and posted music, which later gained virality through TikTok. Leading to him signing a multi-record deal with Artist Partner Group. Odetari recorded the EP experimenting with music production on his laptop, using his usual distorted sounds and samples, a process he described as utilizing a different type of an energy by chasing boredom and being open to inspiration. He stated "Maybe I might not have the energy to record vocals, so I just make 10 beats instead and vice versa." Going further into detail, saying "I don't believe any good art truly comes from you, it comes to you." In which he classified as an energy "beyond ourselves". Odetari collaborated with video game platform Roblox to host the album's release party. Ahmad had felt that he was not really "competing with other artists anymore," explaining that "I had to make it something else besides my music so that people could at least capture their attention and then introduce the music in that same content.” The party was teased in November 2023, and went on from December 6–12, 2023. The album was inspired by video game franchise Kingdom Hearts.

== Release and promotion ==
"You're Too Slow" was released as XIII Sorrow's lead single on May 18, 2023, reaching number twenty-nine on the BIllboard Hot Dance/Electronic Songs chart. Followed by "I Love You Hoe," released as the second single on July 12, 2023, and would go viral on TikTok. Leading to the song being certified gold by the Recording Industry Association of America (RIAA), and reaching top three on the US Hot Dance/Electronic Songs chart. On the NZ chart, "I Love You Hoe" peaked at number 18 for 2 weeks. "Baby I'm Home" was released as the third single on August 16, 2023, and charted at No. 38 on the US Hot Dance/Electronic Songs chart, and "Dxe Dxe Dxe" was released as the fourth and final single on November 8, 2023. The album was released on December 6, 2023, through Artist Partner Group. With the title track peaking at number 36 on the Billboard Hot Dance/Electronic Songs chart.

== Track listing ==
All tracks are written by Taha Ahmad and produced by him, except where noted.

Door to Dusk track listing
No.	Title	Writer(s)	Producer(s)	Length
1.	"Door to Dusk"	Taha Ahmad; Richard Wiggins		2:22
2.	"Purple Heart" (with Don Toliver)	Ahmad; Caleb Toliver		2:05
3.	"Dxe Dxe Dxe" (with Homixide Gang)	Ahmad; Keyon Thomas; Demetrius Chatman		1:36
4.	"I Peep" (with Jnhygs)	Ahmad; Bri Money		2:20
5.	"Material Love" (with Removeface)	Ahmad; Removeface		2:05
6.	"I Love You Hoe" (with 9lives)	Ahmad; Maxwell Jardine	9lives	2:06
7.	"Love Potion"	Ahmad		1:52
8.	"Invite Only" (with Kamo2700)	Ahmad; Kamrin Costly		1:38
9.	"2 Easy" (with Wolfacejoeyy)	Ahmad; Joseph Badejo	Lilswirll	2:37
10.	"Baby I'm Home" (with Kanii and 9lives)	Ahmad; Kani Shorter Jr.; Jardine	9lives	3:28
11.	"You're Too Slow"	Ahmad		1:56
Total length:				24:09

=== Notes ===
- On track 3, the title "Die" is spelled as "Dxe Dxe Dxe"

== Personnel ==
Credits adapted from Tidal.

- Taha Othman Ahmad – production (all tracks; except 6, 9, 10), lyricist, composer
- Richard Parker Wiggins – lyricist, composer (track 1)
- Maxwell Jardine – production, lyricist, composer (tracks 6, 10)
- Jonny Grande – studio personnel, mastering, mixing engineer (track 2)
- Demetrius Chatman – composer, lyricist (track 3)
- Kamrin Costly – composer, lyricist (track 8)
- Al Isler – mastering, studio personnel (track 9)
- Kani Shorter – composer, lyricist (track 10)
- Keyon Thomas – composer, lyricist (track 3)
- Matthew O'Neil – master engineering, mix engineering, recording engineer, studio personnel (track 10)
- Lilswirll – production (track 9)
- Daniel Rowland – mastering, studio personnel (track 9)
- Removeface – composer, lyricist (track 5)
- Caleb Toliver – composer, lyricist (track 2)
- Bri Money – composer, lyricist (track 4)
- Joseph Badejo – composer, lyricist (track 9)

== Release history ==
Release dates and formats for Door to Dusk
Region	Date	Format(s)	Version(s)	Label	Ref.
Various	December 6, 2023	Digital download; streaming	Door to Dusk	Artist Partner Group	
Various	December 12, 2023	Digital download; streaming	Door to Dusk (Odecore Mix)	Artist Partner Group	
