= Eighties (disambiguation) =

Eighties may refer to:

- 1980s, the decade
- "Eighties" (song), a 1984 song by Killing Joke
- The Eighties (miniseries), a 2016 documentary miniseries
- "Party Like The 80s", a 2024 song by Asteria, 6arelyhuman, and Kets4eki

== See also ==
- 80 (disambiguation)
- List of decades
