= Three by three =

3x3 or three by three may refer to:

- 3×3, a 1982 extended play by Genesis
- 3x3 (EP), a 2023 extended play by Odetari and 9lives
- "3 x 3", a 2023 song by Pylon Reenactment Society
- 3 by 3 (Inside No. 9), an episode of the British anthology comedy series Inside No. 9.
- 3x3, the classic version of the Rubik's Cube
- 3x3 basketball, a variation of basketball played three-a-side
