= Keep Up (Odetari song) =

2024 single by Odetari

Song by Odetari

from the EP Keep Up // Frostbite
- B-side: "Frostbite"
- Released: July 17, 2024
- Genre: EDM
- Length: 2:13
- Label: Artist Partner Group
- Songwriter: Taha Ahmad
- Producer: Odetari

Odetari singles chronology
"Desire" (2024)	"Keep Up" / "Frostbite" (2024)	"Run!" (2024)

Music video
- "Keep Up" on YouTube

"Keep Up" (stylized in all caps) is a song written, produced, and performed by American rapper and singer Odetari. It was released alongside "Frostbite" on July 17, 2024, and charted internationally, including in the United States where it became his first charting song, after viral use in TikTok videos and YouTube Shorts.

== Background ==
In June 2024, Odetari asked users to vote on whether he would release "Frostbite" or "Keep Up", and it was announced on his TikTok account that both would be released at the same time. It would traction after widespread use in TikTok videos and YouTube Shorts. The song's music video is filmed in Shibuya Crossing in Tokyo, Japan, was directed by Miggy, and was released on September 5, 2024, on YouTube. The song would also be featured in the UK Official Trending Chart at number 20, which ranks songs showing week-on-week growth on the Official Top 100 Singles Chart.

== Critical reception ==
Andrew Unterberger of Billboard said the song "sounds like the perfect gamer soundtrack".

== Charts ==
=== Weekly charts ===
Weekly chart performance for "Keep Up"
Chart (2024)	Peak position
Australia Dance (ARIA)	10
Austria (Ö3 Austria Top 40)	58
Canada (Canadian Hot 100)	65
Czech Republic Singles Digital (ČNS IFPI)	26
Germany (GfK)	81
Global 200 (Billboard)	91
Ireland (IRMA)	67
Latvia (LAIPA)	16
Lithuania (AGATA)	30
New Zealand Hot Singles (RMNZ)	23
Poland (Polish Streaming Top 100)	42
Slovakia Singles Digital (ČNS IFPI)	31
Switzerland (Schweizer Hitparade)	99
UK Singles (OCC)	50
UK Dance (OCC)	9
US Billboard Hot 100	96
US Hot Dance/Electronic Songs (Billboard)	5

=== Year-end charts ===
Year-end chart performance for "Keep Up"
Chart (2024)	Position
US Hot Dance/Electronic Songs (Billboard)	40

== Certifications ==
Certifications for "Keep Up"
Region	Certification	Certified units/sales
Brazil (Pro-Música Brasil)	Gold	20,000^{‡}
Poland (ZPAV)	Platinum	50,000^{‡}
United States (RIAA)	Gold	500,000^{‡}
^{‡} Sales+streaming figures based on certification alone.
