= GMFU =

GMFU may refer to:

- GMFU (song) by Odetari and 6arelyhuman, 2023
- GMFU (album) by Offset, 2026
