= Keep Up =

Keep Up may refer to:

- Keep Up (EP), a 2016 EP by KSI
  - "Keep Up" (KSI song), a 2015 song by KSI
- "Keep Up" (Heavy Stereo song), a 1996 song by Heavy Stereo
- "Keep Up" (Hyper Crush song), a 2009 song by Hyper Crush
- "Keep Up" (Odetari song), a 2024 song by Odetari
