= GLT =

GLT may refer to:

== Arts and entertainment ==
- Girls' Last Tour, a manga and anime series by Tsukumizu

== Transport ==
- Bombardier Guided Light Transit technology
- Gladstone Airport, Queensland, Australia
- Glenrothes with Thornton railway station, Scotland
- Great Lakes Transportation, an American company

== Other uses ==
- Glatfelter, an American paper manufacturer
- Goal-line technology, in association football
- Great Lakes Theater, Cleveland, Ohio, US
- G-TELP Level Test, an English language test
- "Good Loyal Thots", a song by Odetari from the EP XIII Sorrows, 2023
- Gay, lesbian, or transgender, a LGBTQ acronym variant
