= Look Don't Touch =

2023 single by Odetari featuring Cade Clair

Single by Odetari and Cade Clair

from the album XIII Sorrows
- Released: May 17, 2023
- Genre: EDM
- Length: 2:07
- Label: Artist Partner Group
- Songwriters: Taha Ahmad; Kamoren White
- Producers: Odetari; Giomadx

Odetari singles chronology
"Throat Goat" (2023)	"Look Don't Touch" (2023)	"You're Too Slow" (2023)

cade clair singles chronology
"Yellow" (2023)	"Look Don't Touch" (2023)	"Shake That Shit!" (2023)

Music video
- "LOOK DON'T TOUCH" on YouTube

"Look Don't Touch" (stylized in all caps) is a song written and performed by American rappers and singers, Odetari and Cade Clair, released as a single on May 17, 2023, through Artist Partner Group. The song was produced by Giomadx marking the first time Odetari made a song with a new producer and the fourth collaboration of the duo.

== Background and composition ==
"Look Don't Touch" has a runtime of 2 minutes and 7 seconds, and was written by Odetari and cade clair, with the former handling the production. The song would gain traction on TikTok and rise to about 2-3 million streams across all platforms within one week of being released. The song's music video was directed by Miggy and was released on October 25, 2023.

== Release and reception ==
"Look Don't Touch" was released on May 17, 2023, through Artist Partner Group for digital download and streaming. A few months later, a sped up and slowed and reverbed version was released on a side-account of Odetari. Additionally, a remix was released on September 25, 2023. The song was featured on Odetari's second EP XIII Sorrows. Katie Bain from Billboard noted that the track follows Odetari's trope of "eye-catching" song titles. It would be included in the year-end Hot Dance/Electronic Songs.

== Charts ==
=== Weekly charts ===
Weekly chart performance for "Look Don't Touch"
Chart (2023)	Peak position
US Hot Dance/Electronic Songs (Billboard)	9

=== Year-end charts ===
Year-end chart performance for "Look Don't Touch"
Chart (2023)	Position
US Hot Dance/Electronic Songs (Billboard)	19

== Credits and personnel ==
Credits found from Tidal.

- Odetari – vocals, songwriting, production
- Giomadx - production
- Cade Clair – vocals, songwriting

== Certifications ==
Certifications for "Look Don't Touch"
Region	Certification	Certified units/sales
Brazil (Pro-Música Brasil)	Gold	20,000^{‡}
Canada (Music Canada)	Gold	40,000^{‡}
Poland (ZPAV)	Gold	25,000^{‡}
United States (RIAA)	Gold	500,000^{‡}
^{‡} Sales+streaming figures based on certification alone.
