= Lumi Athena =

Mexican-American record producer (born 2006)

- Born: Marco Antonio Speck Gurrola; January 10, 2006 (age 20); Guadalajara, Mexico
- Musical career
- Origin: United States
- Genres: Krushclub; EDM; indie
- Occupations: Singer; songwriter; record producer
- Years active: 2022–present
- Label: 25/7 Records

Marco Antonio Speck Gurrola (born January 10, 2006), known professionally as Lumi Athena, is a Mexican-American singer, songwriter, and record producer. Born and raised in Guadalajara, Lumi began releasing music in 2022. His music became popular on TikTok and SoundCloud in 2023. His songs "Smoke It Off!", "Let Me See Ya Move!," and "Icewhore! " reached the top 20 of the Billboard Hot Dance/Electronic Songs chart, the first of which being certified gold by the Recording Industry Association of America (RIAA). He is the pioneer and founder of Krushclub and is currently signed to 25/7 Records.

== Career ==
=== 2022–present: "Smoke It Off, Let Me See Ya Move & ICEWHORE" ===
Cover art for Let Me See Ya Move! (Part of Krushclub Vol.1)

"Smoke It Off!", Lumi Athena's debut single featuring Jnhygs, was released on November 21, 2022, through 25/7 Records. and stayed on the Billboard charts alongside "Let Me See Ya Move" for 18–23 weeks straight. On February 20, 2024, it received a platinum certification from the Recording Industry Association of America (RIAA).

Lumi Athena's breakthrough single, "Let Me See Ya Move!" with Cade Clair, appeared on the Billboard charts. Released in July through 25/7 Records, the song has over 1.7 million U.S. streams and debuted at number 26 on Hot Dance/Electronic Songs. During the week of November 3, 2023, 2 months later, the position of the song went to 29.

"Icewhore" became viral on TikTok and Instagram Reels due to its usage in mewing and looksmaxxing meme videos in 2023 and 2024. In the videos, the creators place a finger to their mouth, then point to their jawline to imitate mewing at viewers.

== Discography ==
=== Albums ===
List of Albums, with selected details
Title	EP details
Egoista: Love Yourself!	Released: December 28, 2022; Format: Digital download, streaming
Smoke It Off (Single Pack)	Released: July 31, 2023; Format: Digital download, streaming
Extraphoric	Released: November 29, 2023; Format: Digital download, streaming
Chronos: XIX 0024	Released: August 9, 2024; Format: Digital download, streaming

=== Charted songs ===
List of singles as lead artist, with title, year released, album, and chart positions shown
Title	Year	Peak chart positions	Certifications	Album
Title	Year	US Dance	Certifications	Album
"Let Me See Ya Move!" (with Cade Clair)	2023	28		Non-album singles
"Smoke It Off!" (with Jnhygs)	2023	12	RIAA: Platinum	Non-album singles
"Icewhore!"	2023	29		Non-album singles
"On Dat Bxtch!" (with Masonn Deforest)	2023	—		Non-album singles
"—" denotes a single that did not chart.
