= You are a Top Model =

Model Contest on Television

- Russian: Ты — топ-модель
- Genre: Reality television
- Based on: America's Next Top Model by Tyra Banks
- Country of origin: Russia
- No. of episodes: 13

Original release
- Network: TNT
- Release: March 21 – June 13, 2021

You are a Top Model (Russian: "Ты — топ-модель") is a Russian reality TV show based on America's Next Top Model by Tyra Banks, it is the third installment of the show after You are a supermodel (2004–2007) and Top Model po-russki (2011–2014). The show showed a number of aspiring contestants competing against each other in a series of challenges for the Russia's Top Model title.

The jury consists of social media star and 1st runner-up Miss Russia 2014, Anastasia Reshetova; television personality Alexander Gudkov; fashion stylist and designer Gosha Kartsev and fashion designer Philipp Plein.

The winner of the contest will win an advertising contract for the Philip Plein for a year and a cash prize of 3,000,000 Russian rubles.

The winner of this season was 20-year-old Tina Tova from Krasnodar.

On 19 January 2022, it was announced that castings had begun for season two.

== Cycles ==
Cycle	Premiere date	Winner	Runner-up	Other contestants in order of elimination	Number of contestants
1	21 March 2021	Tina Tova	Vika Kuznetsova	Polina Chernyshova & Aleksandra Kosygina, Nika Kraush (quit), Liza Vdovina, Polina Zasimenkova & Eva Evans, Sabina Rabaia, Katya Pan, Roma Milova & Anastasia Chernobaeva, Anna Tregub, Yana Dobroliubova	14

== Contestants ==
(Ages stated are at start of contest )

Contestant	Age	Height	Hometown	Outcome	Place
Polina Chernyshova	24	1.71 m (5 ft 7 1/2 in)	Moscow	Episode 4	14-13
Aleksandra Kosygina	25	1.65 m (5 ft 5 in)	Rostov-on-Don	Episode 4	14-13
Nika Kraush	24	1.82 m (5 ft 11 1/2 in)	Krasnodar	Episode 6	12 (quit)
Elizaveta 'Liza' Vdovina	21	1.73 m (5 ft 8 in)	Stupino	Episode 6	11
Eva Evans	20	1.67 m (5 ft 5 1/2 in)	Kaliningrad	Episode 7	10-9
Polina Zasimenkova	22	1.80 m (5 ft 11 in)	Kemerovo	Episode 7	10-9
Sabina Rabaia	24	1.75 m (5 ft 9 in)	Moscow	Episode 8	8
Ekaterina 'Katya' Pan	18	1.70 m (5 ft 7 in)	Krasnodar	Episode 9	7
Anastasiya Chernobaeva	32	1.79 m (5 ft 10 1/2 in)	Saint Petersburg	Episode 10	6-5
Tatyana 'Roma' Milova^{1}	31	1.77 m (5 ft 9 1/2 in)	Moscow	Episode 10	6-5
Anna Tregub	26	1.78 m (5 ft 10 in)	Moscow	Episode 11	4
Yana Dobroliubova	23	1.80 m (5 ft 11 in)	Tolyatti	Episode 12	3
Viktoria 'Vika' Kuznetsova	19	1.70 m (5 ft 7 in)	Novosibirsk	Episode 12	2
Tina Tova	20	1.72 m (5 ft 7 1/2 in)	Krasnodar	Episode 12	1

^1 Roma Milova is also known as Tatyana Krokhina. Winner of Ty - supermodel.

== Episode summaries ==
=== Episode 1 ===
Original airdate: March 21, 2021

The episode started with 70 semi-finalists invited to the project, where the judges will decide on the first top 20 to participate in the first photoshoot. After this, only 10 will continue on in the casting process where after 3 weeks, the final 14 models will participate in the competition.

- Eliminated semifinalists: Angelina Garanina, Aleksandra 'Sancesca' Naumova, Anna Mikhailova, Antonina 'Tonya' Starostina, Inessa Bogoslovskaya, Kate Bezvulyak, Ulyana Minenko, Veronika Osichkina, Yana Petrova & Yuliana Lyamina
- Special guests: Vlada Roslyakova

=== Episode 2 ===
Original airdate: March 28, 2021

Continuing from last week, another 20 girls arrived, where once again only 10 will be chosen to advance into the next round.

- Eliminated semifinalists: Maria Trubitsyna, Valeria Salnikova & Zaki Musin
- Featured photographer:
- Special guests:

=== Episode 3 ===
Original airdate: April 4, 2021

This week, the final 20 contestants from the previous weeks were narrowed down to the final top 14.

- Eliminated semifinalists: Anastasiya Chervyakova, Anastasiya Voznyuk, Angelina Andrianova, Elena Sarattseva, Kristina Bridan & Sofia Tuzovskaya
- Featured photographer:
- Special guests:

=== Episode 4 ===
Original airdate: April 11, 2021

- Bottom three: Aleksandra Kosygina, Nika Kraush & Polina Chernysheva
- Eliminated: Aleksandra Kosygina & Polina Chernysheva
- Featured photographer:
- Special guests:

=== Episode 5 ===
Original airdate: April 18, 2021

- Bottom three: Katya Pan, Anastasiya Chernobaeva & Nika Kraush
- Eliminated: Katya Pan & Anastasiya Chernobaeva
- Featured photographer:
- Special guests: Lyasan Utiasheva

=== Episode 6 ===
Original airdate: April 25, 2021

- Quit: Nika Kraush
- Bottom three: Eva Evans, Liza Vdovina & Sabina Rabaia
- Eliminated: Liza Vdovina
- Featured photographer:
- Special guests:

=== Episode 7 ===
Original airdate: May 2, 2021

- Bottom three: Eva Evans, Polina Zasimenkova & Sabina Rabaia
- Eliminated: Eva Evans & Polina Zasimenkova
- Featured photographer:
- Special guests:

=== Episode 8 ===
Original airdate: May 10, 2021

- Returned: Anastasiya Chernobaeva & Katya Pan
- Bottom three: Katya Pan, Sabina Rabaia & Tina Tova
- Eliminated: Sabina Rabaia & Tina Tova
- Featured photographer:
- Special guests: Ksenia Sobchak

=== Episode 9 ===
Original airdate: May 16, 2021

- Returned: Tina Tova
- Bottom three: Anna Tregub, Katya Pan, & Tina Tova
- Eliminated: Katya Pan
- Featured photographer:
- Special guests:

=== Episode 10 ===
Original airdate: May 23, 2021

- Bottom three: Anastasiya Chernobaeva, Roma Milova & Tina Tova
- Eliminated: Anastasiya Chernobaeva & Roma Milova
- Featured photographer:
- Special guests:

=== Episode 11 ===
Original airdate: May 30, 2021

- Bottom two: Anna Tregub & Vika Kuznetsova
- Eliminated: Anna Tregub
- Featured photographer:
- Special guests:

=== Episode 12 ===
Original airdate: June 6, 2021

- Final three: Vika Kuznetsova, Tina Tova, & Yana Dobroliubova
- Eliminated: Yana Dobroliubova
- Final two: Tina Tova & Vika Kuznetsova
- Ty - Topmodel: Tina Tova
- Featured photographer:
- Special guests:

== Call-out order ==
Order	Episode									
Order	3	4	5	6	7	8	9	10	11	12
1	Liza	Yana	Yana	Anna; Polina Z.	Vika	Vika	Roma	Anna	Yana	Tina
2	Anastasiya	Liza	Tina	Anna; Polina Z.	Tina	Anna	Anastasiya	Vika	Tina	Vika
3	Katya	Katya	Polina Z.	Yana	Anna	Yana	Yana	Yana	Vika	Yana
4	Eva	Anna	Liza	Tina	Yana	Anastasiya	Vika	Tina	Anna	
5	Polina Z.	Polina Z.	Vika	Roma	Roma	Roma	Tina	Roma; Anastasiya		
6	Polina C.	Sabina	Eva	Vika	Sabina	Katya	Anna	Roma; Anastasiya		
7	Vika	Tina	Anna	Sabina	Eva; Polina Z.	Sabina; Tina	Katya			
8	Aleksandra	Roma	Roma	Eva	Eva; Polina Z.	Sabina; Tina				
9	Nika	Anastasiya	Sabina	Liza						
10	Anna	Eva	Nika	Nika						
11	Sabina	Vika	Anastasia; Katya							
12	Roma	Nika	Anastasia; Katya							
13	Yana	Aleksandra; Polina C.								
14	Tina	Aleksandra; Polina C.								

The contestant won best performance
The contestant withdrew from the competition
The contestant was eliminated
The contestant was in danger of elimination
The contestant won the competition

- Episodes 1, 2 & 3 are casting episodes. In episodes 1 & 2 the number of semi-finalists was reduced from 70 to 20.
- In episode 3, the remaining 20 semifinalists were reduced to 14 finalists.
- In episode 8, Anastasia and Katya were brought back into the competition
- In episode 9, Tina was brought back into the competition

=== Photo shoots ===
- Episode 1: Divas (Casting)
- Episode 2: B&W vogue dancing (Casting)
- Episode 3: Trust jump into the male crowd (Casting)
- Episode 4: Portret photos with reptiles
- Episode 5: Fashion athletes
- Episode 6: Fashion video in underwear
- Episode 7: Catwalk in train
- Episode 8: Underwater photoshoot
- Episode 9: Natural Beauty Shoot
- Episode 10: Catherine the Great
- Episode 11: Duel in the ring
- Episode 12: Artistic statue

== Criticism ==
The show was criticized by Russian stylist Mikhail Baryshnikov, who accused the jury of being unprofessional.
