= SMB (song) =

Single by Odetari and Hongjoong (홍중)
- Released: January 15, 2025
- Recorded: 2024–25
- Genre: Rap; dance-pop; pop; electronic
- Length: 2:13
- Label: Artist Partner Group
- Songwriters: Taha Ahmad; Hongjoong Kim
- Producer: Odetari

Odetari singles chronology
"Coldest Winter" (2025)	"SMB" (2025)	"Up Freestyle" (2025)

Hongjoong singles chronology
"Snowflake" (2024)	"SMB" (2025)	"Beat It" (2025)

Music video
- "SMB" on YouTube

"SMB" is a song by American rapper Odetari and South Korean singer Hongjoong, released on January 15, 2025. The song had peaked at number twenty-one on the US Hot Dance/Electronic Songs chart. The song garnered mass popularity throughout TikTok and other social media.

== Background and release ==
"SMB" marks Odetari's first collaboration with Hongjoong of K-pop group ATEEZ, exploring themes of success and superiority over others. Snippets of "SMB" were shared throughout late 2024, alongside snippets for other songs, allowing fans to vote on which track Odetari should release next, later scrapped due to Hongjoong's feature, which was officially confirmed on January 7, 2025, following a mistake with the credits of a song released prior. It was later released on January 15, 2025. Hongjoong's first verse was interpreted as a diss towards Hybe Corporation, who manages South Korean boy band BTS. The music video premiered on March 9, 2025, and was directed by Esteban Caicedo.

== Formats and track listings ==
Digital download/streaming
No.	Title	Writer(s)	Producer(s)	Length
1.	"SMB"	Taha Ahmad; Hongjoong Kim	Odetari	2:13
Total length:				1:43

Odecore mix
No.	Title	Length
1.	"SMB" (sped up)	1:30
2.	"SMB" (slowed down)	1:27
3.	"SMB" (slowed & reverbed)	1:54
Total length:		4:51

== Credits and personnel ==
Credits found from Tidal.

- Dee Kei – mastering, mixing
- Taha Othman Ahmad – lyricist, composer
- Hongjoong Kim – author

== Charts ==
Weekly chart performance for "SMB"
Chart (2025)	Peak position
US Hot Dance/Electronic Songs (Billboard)	21
