= Hypnotic Data =

2023 song by Odetari

Song by Odetari

from the EP XIII Sorrows
- Released: September 13, 2023
- Genre: EDM
- Length: 2:08
- Label: Artist Partner Group
- Songwriter: Taha Ahmad
- Producer: Odetari

Music video
- "Hypnotic Data" on YouTube

"Hypnotic Data" is a song written, produced, and performed by American singer, Odetari and was released alongside XIII Sorrows on September 13, 2023. The song peaked at number ten on the US Billboard Dance/Electronic Songs chart. The track was featured as introductory song in his project XIII Sorrows on September 13, 2023.

== Background and reception ==
"Hypnotic Data" was featured as introductory song in his project XIII Sorrows on September 13, 2023, through Artist Partner Group. Liliana Parsons of The Journal had felt that the song "features robotic vocals and beats."

== Charts ==
=== Weekly charts ===
Weekly chart performance for "Hypnotic Data"
Chart (2023)	Peak position
US Hot Dance/Electronic Songs (Billboard)	17

Weekly chart performance for "Hypnotic Data (Odecore Remix)"
Chart (2024)	Peak position
US Hot Dance/Electronic Songs (Billboard)	34

=== Year-end charts ===
Year-end chart performance for "Hypnotic Data"
Chart (2024)	Position
US Hot Dance/Electronic Songs (Billboard)	50

== Certifications ==
Region	Certification	Certified units/sales
Brazil (Pro-Música Brasil)	Platinum	40,000^{‡}
United States (RIAA)	Gold	500,000^{‡}
^{‡} Sales+streaming figures based on certification alone.
