= Billboard Music Award for Top Dance/Electronic Album =

Annual American music award

This article lists the winners and nominees for the Billboard Music Award for Top Dance/Electronic Album. From 2011 to 2013, the award was titled Top Dance Album. In 2013, an additional award called Top EDM Album was also given.

== Winners and nominees ==
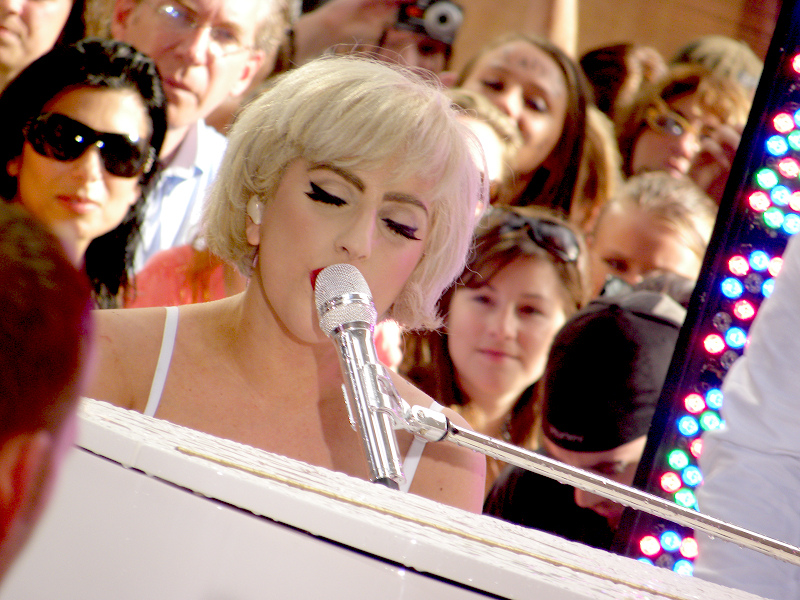
Three-time winner Lady Gaga

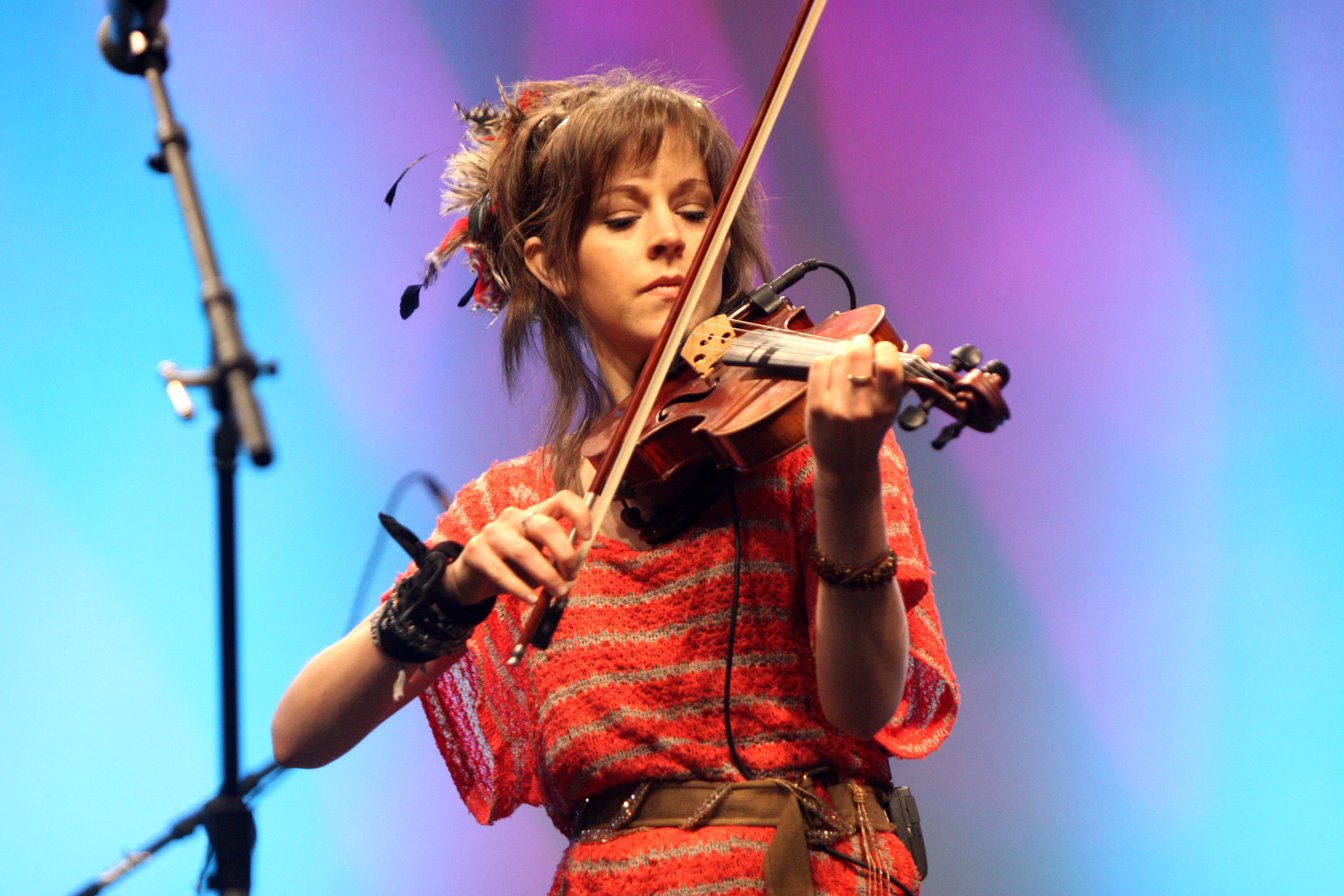
Two-time winner Lindsey Stirling

Winners are listed first and highlighted in bold.

=== 2010s ===
Year	Album	Artist	Ref.
2011	**The Fame**	**Lady Gaga**	
2011	Tron: Legacy	Daft Punk	
2011	The Fame Monster	Lady Gaga	
2011	The Remix	Lady Gaga	
2011	Ocean Eyes	Owl City	
2012	**Born This Way**	**Lady Gaga**	
2012	Nothing but the Beat	David Guetta	
2012	The Fame	Lady Gaga	
2012	Sorry for Party Rocking	LMFAO	
2012	Scary Monsters and Nice Sprites	Skrillex	
2013	**MDNA** (Top Dance Album)	**Madonna**	
2013	Nothing but the Beat	David Guetta	
2013	Album Title Goes Here	Deadmau5	
2013	Sorry for Party Rocking	LMFAO	
2013	Bangarang	Skrillex	
2013	**Bangarang** (Top EDM Album)	**Skrillex**	
2013	Nothing but the Beat	David Guetta	
2013	Album Title Goes Here	Deadmau5	
2013	Scary Monsters and Nice Sprites	Skrillex	
2013	Until Now	Swedish House Mafia	
2014	**Random Access Memories**	**Daft Punk**	
2014	True	Avicii	
2014	Artpop	Lady Gaga	
2014	Lindsey Stirling	Lindsey Stirling	
2014	Clarity	Zedd	
2015	**Shatter Me**	**Lindsey Stirling**	
2015	True	Avicii	
2015	Motion	Calvin Harris	
2015	Settle	Disclosure	
2015	Recess	Skrillex	
2016	**True Colors**	**Zedd**	
2016	Listen	David Guetta	
2016	Peace Is the Mission	Major Lazer	
2016	In Return	Odesza	
2016	Skrillex and Diplo Present Jack Ü	Skrillex and Diplo	
2017	**Brave Enough**	**Lindsey Stirling**	
2017	Bouquet	The Chainsmokers	
2017	Collage	The Chainsmokers	
2017	Skin	Flume	
2017	Cloud Nine	Kygo	
2018	**Memories...Do Not Open**	**The Chainsmokers**	
2018	Avīci (01)	Avicii	
2018	Funk Wav Bounces Vol. 1	Calvin Harris	
2018	Stargazing	Kygo	
2018	A Moment Apart	Odesza	
2019	**Sick Boy**	**The Chainsmokers**	
2019	What Is Love?	Clean Bandit	
2019	7	David Guetta	
2019	Kids in Love	Kygo	
2019	Major Lazer Essentials	Major Lazer	

=== 2020s ===
Year	Album	Artist	Ref.
2020	**Marshmello: Fortnite Extended Set**	**Marshmello**	
2020	Tim	Avicii	
2020	World War Joy	The Chainsmokers	
2020	Ascend	Illenium	
2020	Different World	Alan Walker	
2021	**Chromatica**	**Lady Gaga**	
2021	Carte Blanche	DJ Snake	
2021	Gravity	Gryffin	
2021	Golden Hour	Kygo	
2021	Disco	Kylie Minogue	
2022	**Fallen Embers**	**Illenium**	
2022	Caprisongs	FKA Twigs	
2022	Minecraft – Volume Alpha	C418	
2022	Nurture	Porter Robinson	
2022	Surrender	Rüfüs Du Sol	
2023	**Renaissance**	**Beyoncé**	
2023	Honestly, Nevermind	Drake	
2023	Illenium	Illenium	
2023	Feed the Beast	Kim Petras	
2023	Drive	Tiësto	
2024	**Brat**	**Charli XCX**	
2024	Volcano	Jungle	
2024	XIII Sorrows	Odetari	
2024	Something to Give Each Other	Troye Sivan	
2024	Comfort in Chaos	John Summit	

== Multiple wins and nominations ==
3 wins

- Lady Gaga

2 wins

- The Chainsmokers
- Lindsey Stirling

7 nominations

- Lady Gaga

6 nominations

- Skrillex

5 nominations

- The Chainsmokers
- David Guetta

4 nominations

- Avicii
- Kygo

3 nominations

- Illenium
- Lindsey Stirling
- Odesza

2 nominations

- Calvin Harris
- Daft Punk
- Deadmau5
- LMFAO
- Major Lazer
- Zedd
