= Multimillionaire (9lives and Trippie Redd song) =

Single by 9lives and Trippie Redd featuring Odetari
- Released: 19 January 2024
- Length: 2:01
- Label: Pulse
- Songwriters: Maxwell Jardine; Taha Ahmad; Michael White IV
- Producer: 9lives

"Multimillionaire" is a single by New Zealand based producer 9lives and American rapper Trippie Redd, featuring fellow American rapper Odetari. It was released by Pulse Records on 19 January 2024. The song peaked at number forty-three on the Billboard charts.

== Personnel ==
Credits adapted from Tidal.

- 9lives – producer, composer, lyricist, mastering engineer, mixing engineer, programmer, recording producer
- Odetari – vocals, composer, lyricist, mixing engineer
- Trippie Redd – vocals, composer, lyricist
- Igor Mamet – mixing engineer, recording engineer

== Charts ==
Chart performance for "Multimillionaire"
Chart (2023)	Peak position
US Hot Dance/Electronic Songs (Billboard)	43
