= Killy (rapper) =

Canadian rapper (born 1997)

- Born: Khalil Tatem; August 19, 1997 (age 29); Toronto, Ontario, Canada
- Genres: Canadian hip hop; trap; emo rap
- Occupations: Rapper; singer; songwriter
- Years active: 2014–present
- Labels: Secret Sound Club; Epic (former); Universal (former)
- Website: killy.co

Khalil Tatem (born August 19, 1997), better known by his stage name Killy (stylized as KILLY), is a Canadian rapper from Toronto. He is best known for his break-out single "Killamonjaro" which is certified Platinum by Music Canada, and his debut album "Surrender Your Soul" which is certified Gold by Music Canada.

== Early life ==
Khalil Tatem was born August 19, 1997, to a Bajan father and Filipino mother. Killy grew up in Toronto, Ontario before moving to Victoria, British Columbia at 8 years old. Killy attended a majority Francophone school whilst living in Toronto, though he was one of the only children that didn't speak French. After moving to Victoria, Killy began attending a school where he was one of the only minorities, saying that he was "under-represented." Disinterested in school, Killy took up soccer in his free time and discovered rap music while attending Agincourt Collegiate Institute, eventually making it a hobby. Killy moved back to Toronto as a teenager, living in Scarborough, where he began to focus more of his time on creating music.

== Career ==
KILLY has been rapping since 2014 and involved himself in the Toronto nightlife, quickly making connections. Killy recorded several songs in one studio session in 2015 and released them all in 2016, the only releases he made that year. He released his first song in 2016, titled Big Bux on SoundCloud and released three more tracks in 2016. The tracks gave Killy local buzz in Toronto which provoked him to record more music.

In February 2017, KILLY released Killamonjaro, which went viral and was certified Platinum in Canada in January 2019. The song's popularity garnered him an interview on Adam22's "No Jumper" podcast and a feature on Drake's OVO Sound Radio.

KILLY released his first studio album on March 5, 2018, titled Surrender Your Soul. The album spawned press from Complex and Pitchfork news and "No Sad No Bad" which peaked at number 65 on the Canadian Hot 100 songs.

On September 14, 2018, KILLY released his first EP KILLSTREAK, which includes five songs.

On June 14, 2019, KILLY released his new album LIGHT PATH 8, which includes 13 songs.

On May 28, 2021, KILLY released KILLSTREAK 2, the follow-up to his 2018 EP of the same name. This time delivering a more complete project totaling 14 tracks, as well as a remix.

On September 24, 2021, KILLY released KILLSTREAK 2 (Deluxe), an expanded edition of KILLSTREAK 2 bearing 26 songs, including DEAD FACES (ft. AJ Tracey).

On August 31, 2022, KILLY released CEO which marks the first track released since he left Epic Records.

On December 21, 2022, KILLY released his album "Crazy Life of Sin". The album is made up of 8 songs, consisting features from the names of Smiley, being on the 2nd song of the album, also being a single released before the release of the album, titled "Vince Carter"; and Doe Boy, on the 3rd song on the album, titled "KILLY KILLY".

On September 15, 2023, KILLY released his latest EP, KILLSTREAK 3, also known as K3. This album consists of 7 songs, with each track carrying its own unique significance. However, one particular song, Mind, stands out as it delves into KILLY's profound sense of sorrow after the death of his close friend Shamar Okyere, known as SEGA, which occurred on April 16, 2023.

On September 27th, 2024, KILLY released his long awaited "LIFE I CHOSE", after an almost 2 year hiatus of album releasing. The album consists of 15 songs, 4 of which were singles that he's dropped in early 2024, and late 2023; being his songs "LIFE I CHOSE", "POP 2", ""FR33ZING", and "REAPER". On the single "DOWN FOR ME", KILLY expresses the reasoning for the lack of music releasing and consistency, stating "I was looking just to heal, took some space, and now I'm back", referring to the passing of his best friend and fellow rapper/label signee, SEGA.

== Discography ==
- Surrender Your Soul (2018)
- KILLSTREAK (2018)
- Light Path 8 (2019)
- KILLSTREAK 2 (2021)
- KILLSTREAK 2 (Deluxe) (2021)
- Crazy Life of Sin (2022)
- KILLSTREAK 3 (2023)
- "LIFE I CHOSE" (2024)

=== Singles ===
- 2017: Killamonjaro
- 2017: Distance
- 2017: No Romance (feat. 16yrold)
- 2017: Forecast
- 2018: No Sad No Bad
- 2018: Beautiful 00*
- 2018: Very Scary
- 2019: Swag Flu
- 2019: Triple Helix
- 2019: Drought (feat. 16yrold)
- 2020: Fast Life (feat. Gab3)
- 2020: Vendetta
- 2020: VV's (feat. Houdini & 6ixbuzz)
- 2020: Sailor Moon
- 2020: OH NO (feat. Y2K)
- 2021: PYRO
- 2021: PYRO [Remix] (feat. Scarlxrd)
- 2021: TRUST NOBODY
- 2021: RICK BOOTS
- 2021: EUPHORIC
- 2022: CEO
- 2022: Vince Carter (feat. Smiley)
- 2023: Shinigami Flow (prod. Jaegen)
- 2023: Luv Typhoon (prod. Jaegen)
- 2023: Need Your Love
- 2023: Toronto (feat. SL)
- 2023: Same Energy
- 2023: LOOK AT WHAT WE STARTED (feat. SEGA)
- 2023: Studio Freestyle (feat. SL)
- 2023: "LIFE I CHOSE" (feat. Dom Corleo)
- 2024: "POP 2" (feat. Fourfive)
- 2024: "GLEE"
- 2024: "ALL CAPS"
- 2024: "EMBASSY / AMBASADA" (feat. Bedoes) (prod. młody klakson, kittiesloverage, & francis)
- 2024: "FR33ZING"
- 2024: "REAPER"
- 2024: "NOT LIKE DIS" (feat. Coults)
- 2024: "Lessons" (feat. a4) (prod. 4TheWorld
- 2024: "Jump Off" (feat. Billyracxx)

== Awards and nominations ==
KILLY has been nominated for the Juno Award four times. In 2019, for Breakthrough Artist of the Year, Juno Fan Choice Award and Rap Recording of the Year for Surrender Your Soul. In 2020, Light Path 8 was nominated for Rap Recording of the Year.

Gold/Platinum certifications from Music Canada:

Date	Certification	Artist / Title
October 29, 2020	Platinum Single	KILLY – Distance
October 29, 2020	Gold Single	KILLY – Doomsday
October 29, 2020	Gold Single	KILLY – Forecast
October 29, 2020	Gold Album	KILLY – Surrender Your Soul
October 26, 2020	Gold Single	KILLY – Eye For An Eye
April 21, 2020	Gold Single	KILLY – ANTI EVERYBODY
January 22, 2019	Platinum Single	KILLY – No Sad No Bad
January 8, 2019	Platinum Single	KILLY – Killamonjaro
July 3, 2018	Gold Single	KILLY – Distance
March 13, 2018	Gold Single	KILLY – Killamonjaro
January 22, 2019	Gold Single	KILLY – No Sad No Bad
