= Dom Corleo =

American rapper, singer, and songwriter (born 2002)

- Also known as: Pxpidom
- Born: Dominic Anthony Paoletti; August 19, 2002 (age 24)
- Genre: Hip-hop
- Occupations: Rapper; singer; songwriter
- Years active: 2017–present
- Label: New 11 Records

Dominic Anthony Paoletti (born August 19, 2002), professionally known as Dom Corleo, is an American rapper from Fremont, California. As of 2025, he is based in Phoenix, Arizona. He first rose to fame with the release of his debut album, Forgive Me For My Sins, which released in 2022.

== Early life ==
Growing up, Paoletti predominantly lived in Sacramento and the Bay Area. He is of Italian descent.

== Career ==
Paoletti started making music in 2017, but did not take it seriously until 2020, when he began to post his music under the alias Pxpidom. Under this name, he released tracks such as "Trip 2 Saks" and "Number Nine", with fellow rapper SoFaygo. He also went on to inspire rapper Wolfacejoeyy alongside SoFaygo via a short video posted on Joeyy's TikTok account.

In early 2022, Paoletti changed his stage name to Dom Corleo. He then released his debut album Forgive Me For My Sins, which helped establish his name within the 2020s underground rap scene. Corleo followed this with his biggest single as of yet, "Penthouse Shordy", which went viral on social media. Right after, he released his track "Ginseng", which also performed well online. Following "Ginseng", he released "Bloody Runtz", showcasing his new wave voice and experimental audio. He also released the singles "Fly As Hell" and "Converse" along with their respective music videos, featuring visuals from Dot-Com Nirvan.

In 2023, Corleo released his debut extended play (EP) 2014. The EP has six songs and features from rappers such as Lunchbox and Highway. The EP saw Corleo "[flow] over instrumentals flooded with chopped vocals, ethereal synths and rolling 808s", according to Our Generation Music's Claire Yotts. After a decline in activity for a few months, and releasing just a few singles, Corleo released his second studio album, titled On My Own, which has 14 tracks and features from Yung Kayo and Fimiguerrero. Corleo released a deluxe edition of the album, which featured seven new tracks, with two featuring a reappearance from Yung Kayo. Corleo later appeared as a guest rapper for artists such as Killy and Fourfive.

In 2024, Corleo released a handful of singles, following the promotional single for his album, "Duh Duh Duh", with Veeze. Corleo then released his third studio album, titled Under My Influence. Corleo later released one single and a four-track EP titled DC.

Corleo entered 2025 releasing a handful of singles, most of them being promotional singles for his album. After releasing tracks and building up promotional hype for the album, Corleo released his fourth studio album, Club Siberia, which featured nine tracks.

== Musical style ==
Early on in his career, Dom Corleo's sound was reminiscent to that of artists such as Chief Keef, Autumn! and Summrs. His newer sound takes inspiration from cloud rap, which is reminiscent to artists such as Lancey Foux and Destroy Lonely.

== Tours ==
=== Headlining ===
- On My Own Tour (with Yung Kayo) (2022)
- Under My Influence Tour (2024)

=== Supporting ===
- Summer Smash presented by Lyrical Lemonade (2023)
- 2024 Miami Rolling Loud
- Lancey Foux, Joony - Life In Hell Tour (With SSGKobe)
- Clout Fest (2024)

== Discography ==
Credits adapted from Apple Music.

=== Albums ===
| Title | Details |
|---|---|
| Forgive Me For My Sins | Released: 2022; Type: Studio album; Label: New 11; Formats: Digital download |
| On My Own | Released: 2023; Type: Studio album; Label: New 11; Formats: Digital download |
| On My Own (Deluxe) | Released: 2023; Type: Studio album (Deluxe); Label: New 11; Formats: Digital download |
| Under My Influence | Released: 2024; Type: Studio album; Label: New 11; Formats: Digital download |
| Club Siberia | Released: 2025; Type: Studio album; Label: New 11; Formats: Digital download |
| So Fucking Awesome | Released: 2026; Type: Studio album; Label: New 11; Formats: Digital download |

=== Extended plays ===
| Title | Details |
|---|---|
| 2014 | Released: 2023; Labels: New 11 Records; Formats: Digital download |
| DC | Released: 2025; Label: New 11 Records; Formats: Digital download |

=== Singles ===
| Title | Year | Album |
|---|---|---|
| "My Mind" | 2018 | Non-album single |
| "Trip 2 Saks" | 2019 | Non-album single |
| "Penthouse Shordy" | 2022 | On My Own |
| "Ginseng" | 2022 | Non-album single |
| "Bloody Runtz" | 2022 | Non-album single |
| "Wake Up" | 2023 | On My Own |
| "Rocknroll" | 2023 | Non-album single |
| "Givenchy Jeans" | 2024 | Non-album single |
| "Shawty" (feat. Vik) | 2024 | Non-album single |
| "Rosetta" (feat. Alz) | 2024 | Non-album single |
| "Countin'" (feat. Donoloka) | 2024 | Non-album single |
| "Alicia" | 2025 | Club Siberia |
| "GMFB" | 2025 | Club Siberia |
| "Throw It Up" | 2025 | Non-album single |
| "The Moon" | 2025 | Non-album single |
| "Going Green" | 2025 | Non-album single |
| "Wassup" (feat. Izaya Tiji) | 2025 | Non-album single |
| "Jumpin'" | 2026 | Non-album single |
