= Sins (Let Me In) =

2023 single by Kanii

Single by Kanii

from the EP It Was Nice Knowing U
- Released: September 8, 2023
- Recorded: 2023
- Genre: R&B
- Length: 1:56
- Label: Warner
- Songwriter: Kani Shorter
- Producers: DarillisBeats; Lunas

Music video
- "Sins (Let Me In)" on YouTube

"Sins (Let Me In)" is a song by American singer and rapper Kanii, released on September 8, 2023, by Warner Records. The song was written by Kanii, with production handled by DarillisBeats and Lunas. It is an R&B song driven by bass, incorporating elements of EDM and 808 drums into its mix. The song garnered mass popularity throughout TikTok and other social media. The track was later included in his sixth extended play (EP) It Was Nice Knowing U (2024).

== Background and release ==
In August 2022, Kanii released his breakout single "Attachment", which later garnered mass popularity throughout TikTok and other social medias, and got him a record deal with Warner Records. He would released "Sins (Let Me In)" as a follow-up to "capitalize" on this newfound success. A remix of "Sins (Let Me In)" was later released on October 27, 2023, with a feature from Trippie Redd.

== Critical reception ==
Writing for Stereogum, Katherine St. Asaph had said the song was allusive to the musical styles of Canadian singer The Weeknd and American R&B singer Dawn Richard. HotNewHipHop's Gabriel Bras Nevares wrote that the song was "nothing too remarkable", compared to "the innovation on display in the production". Jason Lipshutz of Billboard had said Trippie Redd brought out "its bleary-eyed, melodic bounce". Lipshutz felt the song was "a match made in heaven".

== Charts ==
=== Weekly charts ===
Weekly chart performance for "Sins (Let Me In)"
Chart (2023)	Peak position
US Hot Dance/Electronic Songs (Billboard)	29

=== Year-end charts ===
2023 year-end chart performance for "Sins (Let Me In)"
Chart (2023)	Position
US Hot Dance/Electronic Songs (Billboard)	94

2024 year-end chart performance for "Sins (Let Me In)"
Chart (2024)	Position
US Hot Dance/Electronic Songs (Billboard)	75

== Certifications ==
Certifications for "Sins (Let Me In)"
Region	Certification	Certified units/sales
United States (RIAA)	Gold	500,000^{‡}
^{‡} Sales+streaming figures based on certification alone.
