= You're Too Slow =

Single by Odetari

from the EP Door To Dusk
- Released: March 29, 2023
- Recorded: 2023
- Genre: Rap; dance-pop; pop; electronic
- Length: 1:56
- Label: Artist Partner Group
- Songwriter: Taha Ahmad
- Producer: Odetari

Odetari singles chronology
"I <3 Latinas" (2023)	"You're Too Slow" (2023)	"Hexxed Her Love <3 XOXO" (2023)

Original cover

Music video
- "You're Too Slow" on YouTube

"You're Too Slow" is a song written and performed by singer and rapper Odetari, independently released as a single on March 29, 2023; the re-release's release date appears as March 29, 2023. and then re-released on May 18, 2023. The song garnered mass popularity throughout TikTok and other social media.

== Background ==
"You're Too Slow" was inspired by the video game character Sonic the Hedgehog, with the title referring to one of the character's catchphrases. The lyrics convey a spirit of competition and the desire to be as fast as Sonic. Odetari uses the lines "Try and keep up with me now" and "Keep up, keep up" as a challenge to demonstrate his speed. It is also categorized as a slowed & reverb/sped up song. The original version of the song includes vocal models and a brief break with an AI-generated voice of Sonic the Hedgehog, indicating hubris and a desire to dominate the game.

== Personnel ==
Credits adapted from Tidal.

- Odetari – producer
- Taha Ahmad – composer, lyricist

== Track listing ==
- Digital download/streaming
1. "You're Too Slow" – 1:56
- You're Too Slow (Keep Up!)
1. "You're Too Slow" (sped up) – 1:39
2. "You're Too Slow" (slowed & reverbed) – 2:10

== Charts ==
=== Weekly charts ===
Weekly chart performance for "You're Too Slow"
Chart (2023)	Peak position
US Hot Dance/Electronic Songs (Billboard)	29

=== Year-end charts ===
Year-end chart performance for "You're Too Slow"
Chart (2023)	Position
US Hot Dance/Electronic Songs (Billboard)	61

== Certifications ==
Certifications for "You're Too Slow"
Region	Certification	Certified units/sales
United States (RIAA)	Gold	500,000^{‡}
^{‡} Sales+streaming figures based on certification alone.
