= Knock2 =

American DJ and music producer

Background information
- Also known as: Richard Singphiphat Nakhonethap
- Origin: San Diego, California, U.S.
- Genres: Bass house; trap; drum and bass
- Occupations: DJ; producer
- Instruments: Keyboards; turntables
- Years active: 2018–present
- Labels: Sable Valley; Nightmode; Dim Mak; 88rising
- Member of: ISOKNOCK
- Website: www.knock2music.com

Richard Singphiphat Nakhonethap, known by the stage name Knock2, is a Laotian-American DJ and music producer from San Diego, California. His music typically combines elements of bass house, trap, and many other musical genres. Nakhonethap is also a member of ISOKNOCK, an electronic music duo composed of himself and ISOxo. He has collaborated with popular EDM artists including Dillon Francis, Nghtmre, and RL Grime. Nakhonethap's increase in popularity has been attributed to energetic DJ sets at standalone shows and festivals in combination with viral social media marketing.

== Early life ==
Introduced to DJing in middle school, Nakhonethap took an interest in music production due to his involvement in his middle school's breakdancing club. Nakhonethap reportedly began DJing at 11 years old and taught himself music production by watching production tutorial videos on YouTube. Nakhonethap attended Rancho Bernardo High School in San Diego where he continued DJing, attracting the interests of artists such as Diplo and Flo Rida. At age 14, Nakhonethap met Julian Isorena, better known by his stage name of ISOxo, at the San Diego County Fair where the two were scheduled to DJ. Nakhonethap and Isorena went on to collaborate heavily on future projects and shows. Nakhonethap has cited NGHTMRE as one of his biggest inspirations.

== Career ==
In 2020, Nakhonethap released the single "What's the Move" in collaboration with Henry Fong and General Degree. On February 5, 2021, Nakhonethap released the single "Dashstar*" which found immediate success and, as of 2024, is his most streamed song. In the same year, Nakhonethap featured in Dancing Astronaut's Artists to Watch in 2021. "Dashstar*" was the third most played song at Electronic Daisy Carnival Las Vegas in 2022. On August 24, 2022, "Dashstar*" was added to Counter-Strike 2 as a Music Kit for the Initiator's Music Box. On August 6, 2021, Nakhonethap released his debut extended play 2Hearts, which contains five tracks. A deluxe version of the extended play was released on September 9, 2022, featuring two additional tracks.

On October 30, 2022, Nakhonethap alongside fellow artist ISOxo under the portmanteau ISOKNOCK, released niteharts. The extended play features a compilation of ten remixes of previous songs.

On January 27, 2023, Nakhonethap released his second extended play, Room202. The extended play contains six tracks and a debut headlining tour accompanying the release titled the "Room202 Tour" included 13 stops. Additional stops were added to the tour including a four-day grand finale at the Shrine Auditorium in Los Angeles, California. On August 18, 2023, Nakhonethap released a deluxe version of the extended play titled ROOM202 dlux which added two additional tracks.

On August 1, 2024, in collaboration with ISOxo, Nakhonethap's debut album as ISOKNOCK, 4Evr, was released. The album contains eight tracks and was released on the 88rising label. In the same year, ISOKNOCK performed at Coachella.

On January 17, 2025, Nakhonethap released his solo debut album, nolimit, containing 17 tracks, on 88rising.

== Discography ==
=== As Knock2 ===
==== Albums ====
- nolimit (2025)

==== Extended plays ====
- 2HEARTs (2021)
- 2HEARTs dlux (2022)
- ROOM202 (2023)
- ROOM202 dlux (2023)

==== Singles ====
Title	Year
"Japan" (with Cheyenne Giles)	2018
"RADIAL" (with ISOxo)	2019
"DVNCEFLOOR" (with Cheyenne Giles)	2019
"What's the Move" (with Henry Fong, General Degree)	2020
"dashstar*"	2021
"SPEAK up!"	2021
"PARANOiD"	2022
"JADE"	2022
"gettin' hott"	2022
"dashstar* (VIP)"	2022
"Make U SWEAT!"	2023
"One Chance" (with NGHTMRE, Marlhy)	2023
"buttons!" (with Dillon Francis)	2023
"feel U luv Me"	2024
"hold my hand"	2024
"come aliv3" (with RL Grime, Abi Flynn)	2024
"sound di alarm"	2026

=== As ISOKNOCK ===
==== Albums ====
- niteharts (2022)
- 4EVR (2024)

==== Singles ====
Title	Year
"SMACK TALK" (with RL Grime)	2024
"4EVR" (with cade clair)	2024
"ENERGY" (with Bantu)	2024
BLIND (RAVE MIX) (with Araya, Sur Back)	2025
