= Exiit =

EP by Kanii
- Released: June 16, 2023
- Recorded: 2023
- Genres: R&B, (hyper)pop
- Length: 19:49
- Language: English
- Labels: Masked; Warner
- Producers: Skuna; PR1SVX; 9lives; Bazemore; dstrctive; Jack Zorana; Lunas; Meantime.; Nate Morgan; Royel 007; SJR; Vrdnyn; whyteodothat

Kanii chronology
Lucent (2022)	Exiit (2023)	It Was Nice Knowing U (2024)

Singles from Exiit
- 1. "I Know" Released: March 10, 2023; 2. "Go" Released: April 28, 2023; 3. "Heart Racing" Released: May 19, 2023

Exiit (Stylized in all lowercase) is the debut extended play (EP) by the American singer and rapper Kanii, released on June 16, 2023. After rising to prominence with his debut single "Attachment" and subsequently signing to Masked and Warner Records, Kanii began working on new material in 2023. He collaborated with multiple record producers including 9lives, and Skuna. The EP was promoted with the singles "Go," "Heart Racing," and "I Know" and a release show was later held in Brooklyn, New York, following the release date.

== Background and composition ==
In August 2022, Kanii released his breakout single "Attachment". It later garnered mass popularity throughout TikTok. Leading to him signing a record deal with Warner Records. Kanii would later start working on material for a new project. In March 2023, the album's lead single "I Know" would release and debut on the US Billboard Hot Dance/Electronic Songs chart. Kanii would confirm that the EP was part of a trilogy. The EP's release show was held at the Market Hotel located in Brooklyn, New York. Exiit is an R&B and (hyper)pop EP that explores themes of romance. DJ Conner of Ones to Watch wrote that Exiit was "a raucous sense of composition fitting for his unique, genreless style, speaks to a borderless mix of tracks with hints of former inspirations."

== Commercial performance ==
exiit debuted at number 10 on Billboard's Top Dance/Electronic Albums chart during the week of July 1, 2023. Within a week of its release the EP had gained 4,000 equivalent album units. The lead single "I Know" would gain a gold certification from the Recording Industry Association of America (RIAA).

== Critical reception ==
The project received general acclaim with complaints about the EP sounding like TikTok, mainly directed to the track "Go". Martha Clifford of Affair Post claimed the EP was evidence of "the ability of talent and fortitude to overcome industry constraints."

== Track listing ==
Exiit Track listing
No.	Title	Writer(s)	Length
1.	"Five"	Kanii; Lunas; Nate Morgan	2:14
2.	"Heart Racing"	Kanii; Riovaz; Nimstarr	2:36
3.	"Invasion"	Kanii; Vrdnyn	2:23
4.	"Plastic Heart"	Kanii; Bazemore; Jack Zorana; Royel 007; SJR; Whyteodothat	2:46
5.	"I Know"	Kanii; Skuna	2:32
6.	"Clumsy Dancer"	Kanii; Bazemore; Dstrctive; SJR	3:16
7.	"I Know (PR1SVX Edit)"	Kanii; PR1SVX	2:13
8.	"Go (Xtayalive 2)"	Kanii; 9lives	1:46
Total length:			19:49

== Charts ==
Chart performance for Exiit
Chart (2023)	Peak position
US Top Dance Albums (Billboard)	10

== Personnel ==
Credits adapted from Tidal.

- Kanii – vocals, songwriting, mixing
- Nimstarr – songwriting (2)
- Riovaz – songwriting (2)
- Skuna – production (7)
- PR1SVX – production (7)
- Eric Lagg – masterer (8)
- 9lives – songwriting, production (8)

== Release history ==
Release dates and formats for Exiit
Region	Date	Format(s)	Label	Ref.
Various	June 16, 2023	Digital download; streaming; CD	Warner Records	
Various	June 30, 2023	Compact disc; LP	Warner Records	
