= It Was Nice Knowing U =

it was nice knowing u

EP by Kanii
- Released: November 17, 2023
- Recorded: 2023
- Genres: R&B
- Length: 21:06
- Label: Warner Records
- Producers: Cade; DarillisBeats; Kevin White; Lunas; Ninetyniiine; Nova; Suki; Twin Shadow; Void Stryker; West

Kanii chronology
Exiit (2023)	it was nice knowing u (2023)

Singles from It Was Nice Knowing U
- 1. "Marry Me" Released: September 1, 2023; 2. "Sins (Let Me In)" Released: September 8, 2023

"it was nice knowing u" (styled in all lower cases) is the sixth extended play by American singer and rapper Kanii, released on November 17, 2023, through Warner Records. With a guest appearance from Trippie Redd, the EP's production was primarily handled by Lunas and West, alongside several other producers.

== Background and composition ==
In 2023, Kani Nkshon Shorter Jr. (a.k.a. Kanii) would release his debut extended play (EP), exiit (2023). Later following up with "it was nice knowing u". For his second major-label release, Kanii wanted to show his “versatility beyond the Jersey club stuff” his sound is often associated with, when making the album he wanted to create a new sound. In an interview with NME, he had expressed “My project before was pretty dance-focused and was very upbeat. With ‘it was nice knowing u’, I delve into a more R&B-ish vibe while continuing that dance momentum.” Kanii would later perform songs off the album at a show in London.

== Critical reception ==
Mackenzie Cummings-Grady of XXL felt that Kanii had capitalized on the momentum of his success with the release of "it was nice knowing u", which was confirmed to be part of a trilogy. While Jada Vernon of Respect My Region felt the EP was a "vibey 8-track collection of dynamic R&B melodies with electro-pop flare."
