= Asteria (singer) =

asteria
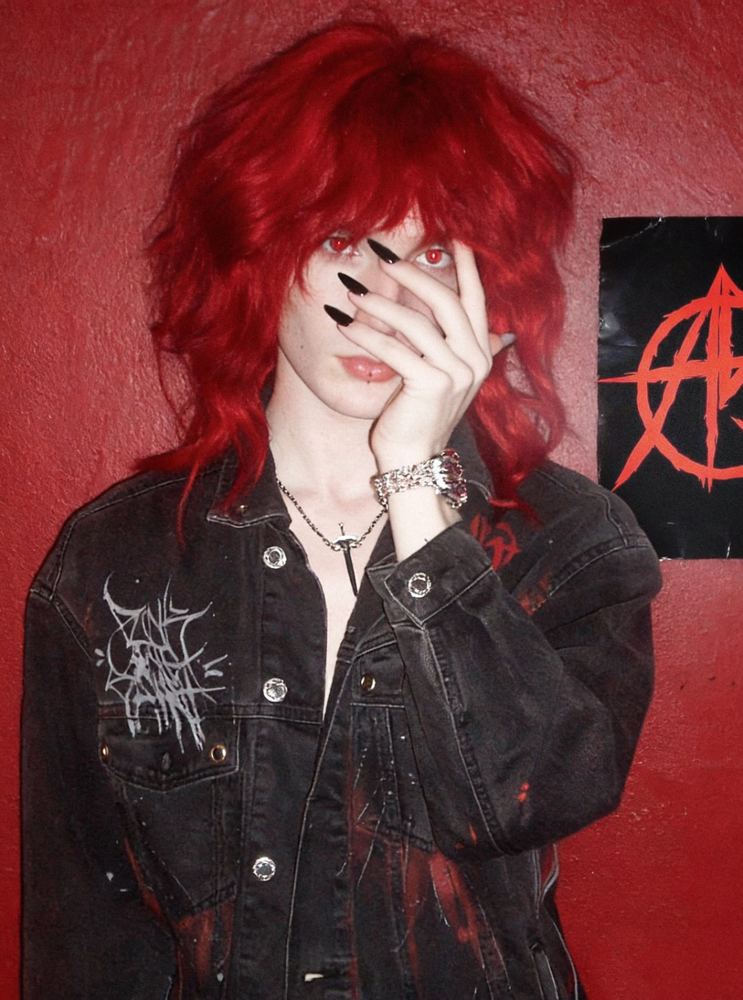
- Joines in 2026

Background information
- Also known as: asteriasdeath, an4rch
- Born: Matthew James Joines; 27 May 2006 (age 20); Whanganui, New Zealand
- Genres: Alternative hip-hop; EDM; hyperpop; scenecore
- Occupations: Record producer; singer; songwriter
- Years active: 2019–present
- Labels: Anarchist Sanctuary; FabFantasy

Matthew James Joines (born 27 May 2006), known professionally as asteria (stylised in all lowercase), is a New Zealand record producer, singer, and songwriter currently based in Warsaw, Poland. He is a prominent figure in the "scenecore" and krushclub subgenres, known for a production style he describes as "sonic anarchy." As of 2026, he has reached over 1.2 million monthly listeners on Spotify.

== Early life ==
Joines was born and raised in Whanganui, New Zealand. He began his musical career at age 14, producing and mixing beats in 2019 under the names crayola and smilecrayola, later joining the Goreset collective in 2021.

== Career ==
=== Career beginnings and breakthrough (2023–2024) ===
In 2023, Asteria began collaborating with Polish artist Kets4eki, releasing the joint album Rave2Death. During this period, he joined the FabFantasy collective alongside artists such as 6arelyhuman, D3r, and Kets4eki. He produced the track "Faster n Harder" for 6arelyhuman, which became a viral success on TikTok and appeared on the Billboard Hot Dance/Electronic Songs chart.

His 2023 single "What You Want!", featuring the virtual singer Hatsune Miku, surpassed 60 million streams on Spotify. In 2024, he released "Eyes on Me", a departure from his usual style as it utilised his natural vocal register.

=== Anarchist Sanctuary (2025–present) ===
In 2025, asteria founded his own independent label and creative collective, Anarchist Sanctuary. On 20 August 2025, he released his debut solo studio album, Asteria Vol. 1, featuring 12 tracks recorded in non-traditional settings such as kitchens and Airbnbs, to maintain an "un-commercialised" sound. In June 2025, he performed a series of shows in Poland, including venues in Poznań and Kraków.

== Personal life ==
Joines dated Russian-Estonian model and singer Britney Manson until mid-2024, when he announced their breakup on an Instagram story. His musical influences include Osquinn, Odetari, Lil Peep, Luci4 and Wifiskeleton.

== Discography ==
=== Studio albums ===
- Rave2death (with Kets4eki) (2023)
- Party4life (with Kets4eki) (2025)
- Asteria Vol. 1 (2025)
- Niche Princess (under the An4rch moniker) (2026)
- 7 Days To Die (2026)

=== Extended plays ===
- Cute Songs For Gangsters (with 6arelyhuman) (2025)
- Scarlet Ashes (2025)

=== Singles ===
- "Coming Down" (2021)
- "Paranoid" (2021)
- "Let You Down" (2021)
- "I Didn't Need You Anyway" (2021)
- "Fusion" (2022)
- "Attachments" (2022)
- "Slower" (feat. Cwispy) (2022)
- "Face Of Death" (2022)
- "Hell n Back" (2022)
- "Like That" (2022)
- "Tonight" (2022)
- "Fostered Alcoholism" (2022)
- "Baddest Bitch Out" (2023)
- "Feel My Luv" (2023)
- "Molly" (with Kets4eki) (2023)
- "Day n Night" (2023)
- "Wiretappers!" (feat. 4cf) (2023)
- "I Fucked Her Friend" (with Kets4eki) (2023)
- "Tryna Fuck (Sparta)" (with Kets4eki) (2023)
- "Gone, for So Long" (with Kets4eki) (2023)
- "Wonder Why" (2023)
- "What'd I Say.." (with D3r) (2023)
- "Demon in Disguise" (with Nosgov) (2023)
- "See Through" (with D3r) (2023)
- "Something's Not Okay" (with Pink Luu and Kets4eki) (2023)
- "Biggest Fan" (with D3r) (2023)
- "Feeling Nothing" (with Kets4eki and 6arelyhuman) (2023)
- "Project X" (with Kets4eki) (2023)
- "Go_Hard" (with Kets4eki) (2023)
- "Worldwide" (with Hubithekid) (2023)
- "Every Pill" (with Kets4eki) (2023)
- "Too Many Lines!" (with Kets4eki) (2023)
- "Body On The Floor" (with Pluto and Lytra) (2023)
- "What You Want!" (feat. Hatsune Miku; has a remix with 6arelyhuman and Kets4eki, also has a cover by Vyzer) (2023)
- "BFM" (with Britney Manson and Kets4eki) (2024)
- "Messages" (with Kmrnxo, Kets4eki, and Vyzer) (2024)
- "Rock That Shit!" (2024)
- "No Escape" (with D3r and M1v) (2024)
- "Second Chances" (has a remix produced by Xaduma) (2024)
- "Eyes on Me" (2024)
- "Faster n Harder (Remix)" (with 6arelyhuman and Kets4eki)(2024)
- "Ultra Instinct" (with Kets4eki) (2024)
- "Hold Up!" (with Lytra and Kets4eki) (2024)
- "Party Like The 80s" (with 6arelyhuman and Kets4eki)(2024
- "Don't Understand It" (with Kets4eki) (2024)
- "Tell Me Lies" (with Odetari) (2024)
- "Die for You" (2024)
- "Rockst4r" (2024)
- "Monster" (2024)
- "Haha!" (with Lytra; has a remix with Kets4eki and Vyzer)(2024)
- "Out of Body" (2024)
- "W4ste Away" (with Sickboyrari) (2024)
- "Worst Nightm4re" (2024)
- "Drift" (with Vyzer and Lytra) (2025)
- "Bloodbath" (with 6arelyhuman) (2025)
- "Exotic" (has a remix produced by Xaduma) (2025)
- "You Can't Hide" (2025)
- "Millionaire" (with 6arelyhuman and Kets4eki) (2025)
- "AMG" (with D3r and Kets4eki) (2025)
- "Tax on It!" (with Kets4eki) (2025)
- "Stress Stres Stres" (with Kets4eki and 5GSWAG) (2026)
- "That's the Way I Like It" (2026)
- "Dance For Me" (with Kets4eki) (2026)
- "Be Like Me" (with 6arelyhuman and Kets4eki) (2026)
- "Why Can't I Be Happy" (2026)
- "Bad for You" (2026)
- "Sexy Girl" (2026)
