= 4EVR =

Studio album by ISOxo & Knock2
- Released: August 1, 2024
- Genres: Pop; future bass; electronic trap; hybrid trap; hardstyle; trap; dance; bass music; electronic
- Label: 88rising
- Producers: Julian Isorena; Richard Nakhonethap; Henry Steinway

ISOxo chronology
kidsgonemad! (2023)	4EVR (2024)	KGM(irl)* (2024)

Knock2 chronology
ROOM202 (2023)	4EVR (2024)	nolimit (2025)

Singles from 4EVR
- 1. "SMACK TALK" Released: June 28, 2024

4EVR is a collaborative album by American DJs ISOxo & Knock2 under the moniker ISOKNOCK, released by 88rising on August 1, 2024. Produced by the duo along with RL Grime, the EP experiments with sounds among multiple genres across its 8 tracks, and was promoted by its only single "SMACK TALK", a San Diego show, and the ISOKNOCK 4EVR tour.

== Release and promotion ==
Along with the release of "4EVR," ISOKNOCK also co-directed a unique short film/music video for the album's title track. The short film, which explores an unusual relationship between a motorcyclist and a young lady who fell in love at an underground party, premiered July 31, 2024, at a gallery show and record release event in Los Angeles. Earlier that same year, ISOKnock performed at Coachella 2024 in April.

== Personnel ==
Credits adapted from Tidal.
Production

- ISOxo – production (all tracks)
- Knock2 – production (all tracks)

Musicians

- Kamoren White – songwriting (8)

== Critical reception ==
Jason Heffler of EDM.com described it as "equal parts beautiful and belligerent". Grant Gilmore of EDM Identity noted that the album showcases their "unique twist" on trap and experimental bass.

== Track listing ==
All tracks are written by ISOKNOCK, ISOxo & Knock2.

No.	Title	Writer(s)	Length
1.	"THRASH (PARTY STARTER)"		3:11
2.	"TROUBLE"		2:50
3.	"ENERGY"		3:29
4.	"PAIN"		3:47
5.	"SMACK TALK"		4:00
6.	"SIGNAL"		3:23
7.	"BLIND"	Araya, Sur Back	3:36
8.	"4EVR"	cade clair	3:15
Total length:			27:34
