= I Love You Hoe =

2023 collaborative single by Odetari & 9lives

Song by Odetari and 9lives

from the EP 3x3 and the album Door To Dusk
- Released: July 12, 2023
- Genre: Hyperpop; sigilkore
- Length: 2:07
- Producer: 9lives

Remix cover

Audio sample
- Odetari – "I Love You Hoe": file; help

Music video
- "I Love You Hoe" on YouTube

"I Love You Hoe" (stylized in all caps) is a song by American rapper Odetari and New Zealand record producer 9lives as the second single from the former's extended play (EP) Door to Dusk (2023). The song peaked at number eighteen on the New Zealand Hot Singles chart for a whole week, first charting on August 18, 2023. While on the US Hot Dance/Electronic Songs chart, it had peaked at the top three.

"I Love You Hoe" is a hyperpop song that blends elements of sigilkore, electropop, and EDM. Its sonic palette includes synthesizers, emo melodies, a medium tempo. Lyrically, the song delves into a deep affection of love and devotion towards a significant other. Despite its potential title and explicit lyrics, the song focuses on the depth and emotion and connection rather than objectification. The music video for the song would be released a few months later.

== Background and release ==
"I Love You Hoe" was released on July 12, 2023, as the introductory track from Odetari and 9lives' collaborative EP 3x3 (2023), and the former's EP Door To Dusk (2023). It peaked at top three, and received a gold certification from the Recording Industry Association of America (RIAA). The song later got a remix featuring Trippie Redd. The lyrics were written and performed by Odetari, while the production was handled by 9lives. The song has traces of hyperpop and sigilkore.

== Critical reception ==
Laura McInnes of Sniffers described that Trippie Redd added to the glamour of the original track, "fusing his emo rap with the jersey club elements."

== Charts ==
=== Weekly charts ===
Weekly chart performance for "I Love You Hoe"
Chart (2023)	Peak position
New Zealand Hot Singles (RMNZ)	18
US Bubbling Under Hot 100 (Billboard)	19
US Hot Dance/Electronic Songs (Billboard)	3

=== Year-end charts ===
2023 year-end chart performance for "I Love You Hoe"
Chart (2023)	Position
US Hot Dance/Electronic Songs (Billboard)	28

2024 year-end chart performance for "I Love You Hoe"
Chart (2024)	Position
US Hot Dance/Electronic Songs (Billboard)	56

== Certifications and sales ==
Region	Certification	Certified units/sales
Brazil (Pro-Música Brasil)	Gold	20,000^{‡}
United States (RIAA)	Gold	500,000^{‡}
^{‡} Sales+streaming figures based on certification alone.
