= Wolfacejoeyy =

Background information
- Also known as: Joeyy
- Born: Joseph Badejo; 2001 or 2002 (age 23–24); Staten Island, New York
- Genres: Hip-hop; R&B
- Occupations: Rapper; singer; songwriter; record producer
- Years active: 2019–present
- Label: Alamo Records

Joseph Badejo, known professionally as Wolfacejoeyy (stylized in lowercase), is a Nigerian-American rapper, singer and producer.

== Career ==
Joseph Badejo began making music as a teenager. He was inspired by rappers such as Dom Corleo and SoFaygo. His alias "Wolfacejoeyy" was inspired by Tyler, the Creator.

After collaborating with the producer WhereIs22 to release their collaborative EP "22Joeyy" in September 2023, Wolfacejoeyy's track "Cake" went viral. His album Cupid had a score of 6 on RapReviews; Valentino had a score of 7.4. Badejo released a song called "Miss Me", which led to him being approached by labels for the first time. He was also featured in the "Paradise and Brighton Music Hall".

In 2024, Badejo performed at Powerhouse NYC. On February 20, Wolfacejoeyy sang at the Bentley Campus Black History Month event. "'Alexis Texas'" was surprisingly mild and slightly sexual for a song named after a pornstar", according to Alphonse Pierre of Pitchfork. Wolfacejoeyy performed a freestyle to a club-inspired WhereIs22 beat on On the Radar, later releasing the official version titled "Shake It".

== Musical style ==
Music reviewers have characterized Badejo's music using a variety of terms, mainly being "sexy-drill".

== Discography ==
=== Albums ===
- All Your Fault (2022)
- 22Joeyy(2023)
- Before Cupid (2024)
- Finsta / Bia (2024)
- Valentino (2024)
- Cake / Don't Be Dishonest (2024)
- Cupid (2025)
- SummerSongs (2025)

=== Singles ===
- Cake (2024)
- Nympho (2024)
- Buku (2023)
- Finsta (2024)
- Alexis Texas (2024)
- Trip (2025)
- Say Yes (2025)
- Bae (2025)
- Kanye Kim (2025)
