= 9lives =

- Born: Maxwell Warren Jardine; 10 March 2004 (age 22); Hawke's Bay, New Zealand
- Genres: Hip-hop; sigilkore; cloud rap
- Occupations: Record producer, songwriter
- Years active: 2022-present
- Label: Pulse Records

Maxwell Warren Jardine (born 10 March 2004), known professionally as 9lives, is a New Zealand record producer based in Auckland. Known for aiding in the popularisation of sigilkore, a mix of trap, hyperpop, cloud rap, and electronic music, he has released music collaborations with Odetari, Trippie Redd, Kanii, and Lil Nas X. 9lives has an RIAA certified Gold single "I Love You Hoe" with Odetari, and was named in Rolling Stone Australia's Future of Music, a celebration of the most exciting and innovative artists from Australia and New Zealand.

== Early life ==
Maxwell Jardine was born in rural small-town Hawke's Bay, New Zealand and is of South African descent. He grew up in a musical household where everybody in his family played instruments, and he played the drums from a young age. 9lives claims that playing the drums is what first got him into production, making his own beats after playing drums for 12 years and eventually transitioning into production drum loops during his free time in high school.

== Career ==
9lives began posting beats and remixes on SoundCloud in 2021. In late 2022, 9lives' music, in particular debut single "Khaos Emerald", began going viral on TikTok. "I guess that's how it started", Maxwell said when referring to his early success as an artist, "all those kinds of edits of movie visuals with the sound behind it just started happening out of nowhere". He continued releasing singles more frequently, collaborating with other artists in the underground to reach new audiences. 9lives released "Xtayalive" with Jnhygs on February 22, 2023, and "Go (Xtayalive 2)" with Kanii on April 28, 2023. His single "I Love You Hoe" became his first to chart when it reached #3 on the Billboard Dance/Electronic charts on September 2, 2023, as part of the collaborative EP, 3x3, with Odetari. On January 16, 2024, 9lives had signed to Pulse Records.

=== Musical style ===
9lives' music has been described as sigilkore or dark trap. He describes his music as "the back end of hyperpop, but more in the space of Raider Klan where it's a bit more dark, grungy and underground". Laura McInnes of Sniffers wrote that 9lives' music "fuses together ethereal lofi trap textures of cloud rap, the manipulated chopped vocal pitches of hyperpop, and the uptempo bounce and animated sound FX of electronic club styles". Jon Barlas of Our Generation Music wrote that "9lives' sound feels like you're fighting a final boss on the last level of Arkham Asylum, gripping your controller ever-so-tightly". He has referred to Luci4 and Raider Klan as musical influences in multiple interviews.

== Discography ==
=== Extended plays ===
List of extended plays, with release year, label / distribution partner, and format.
Title	Details
#Exclusive	Released: November 13, 2022; Label: The System; Format: Digital download, streaming
33.1FM	Released: February 17, 2023; Label: The System; Format: LP, Digital download, streaming
3x3 (with Odetari)	Released: July 12, 2023; Label: Artist Partner Group; Format: Digital download, streaming
9	Released: October 30, 2026; Label: PULSE Records; Format: Digital download, streaming

=== Singles ===
List of singles, with title, year released, album, and chart positions shown
Title	Year	Peak chart positions		Certifications	Album
Title	Year	US Dance	NZ Hot	Certifications	Album
"Khaos Emerald"	2022	—	—		#exclusive
"Glacier"	2022	—	—		#exclusive
"Ghostrider"	2023	—	—		Non-album singles
"Xtayalive" (with Jnhygs)	2023	—	—		Non-album singles
"Go (Xtayalive 2)" (with Kanii)	2023	—	—	RIAA: Gold	Exhibit
"Reassure Me" (with Odetari)	2023	—	—		3x3
"Jerk!" (with Jnhygs)	2023	45	—		Non-album single
"I Love You Hoe" (with Odetari)	2023	3	18	RIAA: Gold	3x3
"Baby I'm Home" (with Odetari & Kanii)		38	—		Door to Dusk
"Multimillionaire" (with Trippie Redd & Odetari)	2024	43	—		Non-album single
"Light" (with Skaiwater & Lil Nas X or Midwxst)	2024	—	—		#Gigi
"Canada" (with Jnhygs)	2024	—	—		Non-album single
"Nuk3" (with Luci4 & Lazer Dim 700)	2024	—	—		TBA
"Abu Dhabi" (with Lancey Foux)	2024	—	—		TBA
"I Did It" (with Kanii & Anycia)	2024	—	—		TBA
"My Way" (with Kanii & Rico Nasty)	2024	—	—		TBA
"Man of the Year" (with Prettifun)	2024	—	—		TBA
"Up Freestyle" (with Odetari)	2025	—	—		
"—" denotes a single that did not chart, or no chart data is available.
