= Britney Manson =

Russian model and social media personality

- Born: Nika Kraush; July 2, 1995 (age 31); Krasnodar, Russia
- Occupations: Model, Singer, Social media personality
- Years active: 2007–present
- Modeling information
- Agency: SMC Model Management (Wiesbaden); Fox Creatives (New York City)

Nika Kraush (Russian: Ника Крауш) (born July 2, 1995), known professionally as Britney Manson, is a transgender Russian-Estonian model, singer, and social media personality. She started her TikTok account in 2017 and became known for her modeling videos in 2019. She has since been signed to Elite Model Management for modeling.

== Career ==
Manson began modeling at age 12, when she snuck backstage during a runway show at a shopping mall and asked the team running it if she could work with them; she got a call from them the following week. She later walked in fashion weeks in Russia and China without a mother agency.

In 2021, she competed on the modeling competition Ty - Topmodel on TNT under the name Nika Kraush.

In 2022, Manson began releasing music, starting with her singles "Everyone (I'm Stuck)" and "Mode-L", and created a TikTok account. A video of her crossing the street as a model posted to her account in November 2022 gained over ten million views within several hours. Her subsequent "Walking Until I Get Noticed by a Model Agency" series, in which she did runway walks in public places in response to rejections she received from modeling agencies, also became popular on the platform. She also began posting tutorials on how to walk like supermodels, including Naomi Campbell, Shalom Harlow, and Kendall Jenner, that gained traction on TikTok. She later signed with Elite Models NYC and, in February 2023, walked for Vetements, Namilia, Mario Dice, Alessandro De Benedetti and Philipp Plein . In August 2023, she released the single "Fashion", which became popular on TikTok and debuted at number 41 on the Billboard Hot Dance/Electronic Songs chart the following month.

== Personal life ==
Manson is transgender and began her transition at age 15, which led to bullying from her schoolmates and teachers, one of whom, according to Manson, referred to her as a "faggot" who did not "deserve to live" and encouraged other students in her class to pick on Manson. The bullying led Manson to attempt suicide three times.

As of 2023, she is based in Warsaw, Poland.

In 2024, Britney was in a relationship with Asteria, while he was around 18 and she was 29. That year, the two both posted about their breakup and had a dispute over Britney allegedly not being paid deserved royalties for the song Asteria and kets4eki made, "BFM."
