= Smoke It Off =

"Smoke It Off!"

Single by Lumi Athena and Jnhygs

from the EP SMOKE IT OFF
- Released: November 21, 2022
- Genre: EDM; dance-pop; electro-pop; glitch; hyperpop; Krushclub
- Length: 1:57
- Label: 25/7 Records
- Songwriters: Marco Gurrola; Bri Money
- Producer: Lumi Athena

Lumi Athena singles chronology
| "I Hate You, Desireé!" (2022) | "Smoke It Off!" (2022) | "Him Over Me!" (2022) |

Jnhygs singles chronology
| "Goin Up!" (2022) | "Smoke It Off!" (2022) | "Xtayalive" (2022) |

Music video
- "SMOKE IT OFF! MV" on YouTube

"Smoke It Off!" (stylized in all caps) is a song by American record producer Lumi Athena. The song features vocals from American singer Jnhygs. Written by both performers. The song was released on November 21, 2022, through 25/7 Records.

== Background ==
The song stayed on the Billboard charts alongside "Let Me See Ya Move" for 18–23 weeks straight. On February 20, 2024, it received a gold certification from the Recording Industry Association of America (RIAA), over a year later, a platinum certification. The song gained virality on platforms such as TikTok. "Smoke It Off" was produced by Lumi Athena and sung by Jnhygs. It is categorized as krushclub.

== Charts ==
=== Weekly charts ===
Weekly chart performance for "Smoke It Off!"
| Chart (2024) | Peak position |
|---|---|
| US Hot Dance/Electronic Songs (Billboard) | 12 |

=== Year-end charts ===
Year-end chart performance for "Smoke It Off!"
| Chart (2024) | Position |
|---|---|
| US Hot Dance/Electronic Songs (Billboard) | 37 |

== Certifications ==
| Region | Certification | Certified units/sales |
|---|---|---|
| United States (RIAA) | Platinum | 1,000,000^{‡} |
^{‡} Sales+streaming figures based on certification alone.
