= The Parkersburg News and Sentinel =

Newspaper in Parkersburg, West Virginia

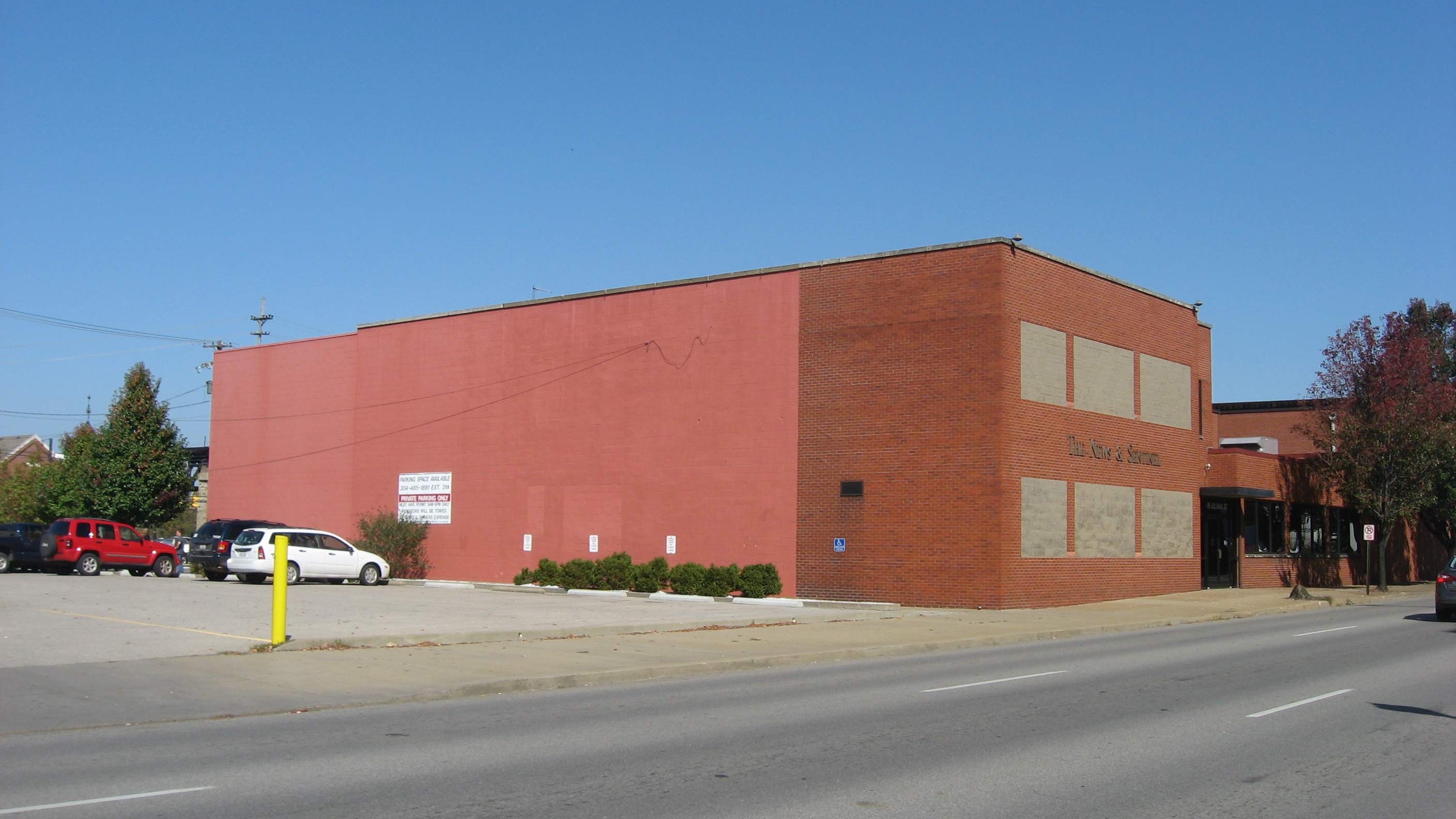
- Offices of the News and Sentinel
- Type: Daily newspaper
- Format: Broadsheet
- Owner: Ogden Newspapers Inc.
- Publisher: James Spanner
- Headquarters: 519 Juliana Street; Parkersburg, West Virginia 26101
- Circulation: 14,090 Daily; 15,787 Sunday (as of 2025)
- Website: newsandsentinel.com

The Parkersburg News and Sentinel is the primary newspaper in Parkersburg, West Virginia.

== History ==
The newspaper was formed by the merger of the previously separate morning News and afternoon Sentinel on April 25, 2009. Prior to the merge, the Sentinel had published continuously for 134 years.

The first Parkersburg News, owned by secessionist Charles Rhoads, began publication before the Civil War. In May 1861, the office was destroyed by a crowd of pro-Union men, and Rhoads was driven out of town. It was 36 years, in February 1897, before the paper (with different ownership) resumed publication. In 1915, Wheeling publisher Herschel C. Ogden, an ancestor of the present owners of Ogden Newspapers, became the owner.

The Parkersburg Sentinel was founded in 1875 by Robert Hornor and acquired by Herschel Ogden in 1912. The Daily Sentinel was established as a voice of the Democratic Party and as competition for the Republican-oriented Daily State Journal. The morning Parkersburg News is published seven days a week, while the evening Parkersburg Sentinel was published Monday through Saturday until the newspapers merged in 2009.

== See also ==
- List of newspapers in West Virginia
