= I Know (Kanii song) =

2023 single by Kanii

- Standard cover (Note: The cover art for the remix is the exact same, but red)

Single by Kanii

from the EP Exiit
- Released: March 10, 2023
- Recorded: 2022–23
- Genre: Jersey club
- Length: 2:32
- Label: Masked; Warner
- Songwriters: Kani Nkshon; Henrique Laki Nsuka Ibanda
- Producer: Skuna

Kanii singles chronology
"I Know" (2023)	"Go (Xtayalive 2)" (2023)

Audio sample
- Kanii – "I Know": file; help

Audio sample
- Kanii – "I Know (PR1ISVX Edit)": file; help

Music video
- "I Know" on YouTube

"I Know" is the debut single by American rapper and singer Kanii, released on March 10, 2023, through Warner and Masked Records. As the lead single from Kanii's debut extended play (EP), Exiit (2023). The song would later gain traction through social media platforms, such as TikTok. A remix version produced by PR1SVX was also released and features on the digital and streaming version of the album and would also surge in popularity.

== Composition and background ==
The song features bass, choir samples, and synths. The song can be classified as the combination of jersey club and R&B. The song gained traction through social media platforms, such as TikTok. A version produced by PR1SVX was also released and features on the digital and streaming version of the album. Which went viral on TikTok and had been used in over 200,000 videos on the platform. "I Know" had originally debuted at number 95 on the US Billboard Hot Dance/Electronic Songs chart.

== Music video ==
The music video premiered on March 15, 2023 on Kanii's YouTube channel and was directed by Tommy Kiljoy.

== Charts ==
Chart performance for "I Know"
Chart (2023)	Peak position
Canada (Canadian Hot 100)	50
Global 200 (Billboard)	191
Ireland (IRMA)	50
New Zealand Hot Singles (RMNZ)	16
UK Singles (OCC)	64
US Billboard Hot 100	90
US Hot R&B/Hip-Hop Songs (Billboard)	29

== Certifications ==
Certifications for "I Know"
Region	Certification	Certified units/sales
Canada (Music Canada)	Platinum	80,000^{‡}
New Zealand (RMNZ)	Gold	15,000^{‡}
United States (RIAA)	Platinum	1,000,000^{‡}
^{‡} Sales+streaming figures based on certification alone.
