= Jnhygs =

American singer and rapper (born 2007)

- Also known as: Bri Money; Jin-hygs; Jin-higgs
- Born: Briasia Genell Lockett; March 9, 2007 (age 19); Kirkland, Washington, U.S.
- Origin: Alabama, U.S.
- Genres: Electronic; Sigilkore
- Occupations: Rapper; singer; songwriter
- Years active: 2022–present
- Label: 25/7 Records

Briasia Genell Lockett (born March 9, 2007), professionally known as Jnhygs (stylized in all lowercase), is an American rapper, singer and songwriter based in Alabama. Her songs became popular on TikTok and SoundCloud in 2023, and her songs "Xtayalive", "Smoke It Off", and "Shake That Shit" reached the top 40 of the Billboard Hot Dance/Electronic Songs chart, the former of all debuted at number 12 on the aforementioned chart and was certified gold by the Recording Industry Association of America (RIAA). She is currently signed to 25/7 Records.

== Career ==
=== 2022–present: Breakthrough, "Xtayalive" and others ===
Jnhygs would begin releasing music in 2022. "Smoke It Off!", Jnhygs's debut single, was released on November 21, 2022, through 25/7 Records. and stayed on Billboard charts alongside for 18–23 weeks straight. It later received a platinum certification from the Recording Industry Association of America (RIAA).

"Xtayalive" and "Jerk!" would rise to success through TikTok, with the latter peaking on the US Hot Dance/Electronic Songs Billboard chart at No. 45. On June 2, 2023, Jnhygs, Cade Clair, ProdByAbnormal and HR would collaborate on the song "Shake That Shit!", which would later become a commercial success, peaking at 43 for over 10 weeks. Jnhygs and 9lives would then collaborate on the song "Canada", which was released on April 19, 2024, via Pulse Records.

== Discography ==
=== Singles ===
List of singles as lead artist, with title, year released, album, and chart positions shown
Title	Year	Peak chart positions	Certifications	Album
Title	Year	US Dance	Certifications	Album
"Xtayalive" (with 9lives)	2023	—		Non-album single
"Smoke It Off" (with Lumi Athena)	2023	12	RIAA: Platinum	Non-album single
"Jerk!" (with 9lives)	2023	45		Kollective
"Shake That Shit!" (with Cade Clair)	2023	43		Kollective
"Bounce It!"	2024	—		Non-album single
"F**k n Repl4ce!" (with Lumi Athena & Xxanteria)	2024	—		LOVE LETTER!
"Lemmehxt" (with Xxanteria)	2024	—		Non-album single
"Canada" with (9lives)	2024	—		Non-album single
"Red" with (9lives)	2025	—		Silent Chaos
"—" denotes a single that did not chart.
