= Good Loyal Thots =

2023 single by Odetari

Single by Odetari

from the EP XIII Sorrows
- Released: March 15, 2023
- Genre: EDM
- Length: 1:43
- Label: Artist Partner Group
- Songwriter: Taha Ahmad
- Producer: Odetari

Odetari singles chronology
"Good Loyal Thots" (2023)	"Twilight Lament" (2023)

Original cover

Music video
- "Good Loyal Thots" on YouTube

"Good Loyal Thots" (stylized in all caps) is the debut single by American rapper and singer Odetari. A fast-paced EDM song with Jersey club influences, it was self-released on March 15, 2023, and later rereleased through Artist Partner Group. Soon after "Good Loyal Thots"'s release, it became popular on TikTok. It later peaked at number eight on Billboard's Hot Dance/Electronic Songs chart and number twenty-nine on the New Zealand Hot Singles chart. Additionally, it was certified platinum by the Recording Industry Association of America (RIAA) and gold by Pro-Música Brasil and Music Canada.

== Background and composition ==
Odetari has stated that the "playboy" lyrics of "Good Loyal Thots" were written about falsely trying to appear aloof in the face of heartbreak. The fast-paced song features Jersey club influences. Ethan Shanfeld of Variety described "Good Loyal Thots" as a "club jam" with "a certain braggadocious disaffectation", while Billboard's Katie Bain wrote that the song's production was "like getting stoned in space". Craig Lindsey of Chron referred to the song's title as "vulgar" and "eye-catching".

== Release and reception ==
"Good Loyal Thots" was self-released on March 15, 2023. It would later go viral on TikTok. Jon Caramanica of The New York Times included "Good Loyal Thots" as an honorable mention on his list of the best songs of 2023. The song became Odetari's first song to find popularity on TikTok, having been used in ten thousand videos on the platform within a day of its release. It peaked at number eight on Billboard's Hot Dance/Electronic Songs and charted at number sixteen on the chart's year-end edition in 2023. It also peaked at number twenty-nine on the New Zealand Hot Singles chart. It was also certified gold by the Recording Industry Association of America (RIAA) in 2024, before being certified platinum later in 2025. It was also certified gold by Pro-Música Brasil and Music Canada.

== Charts ==
=== Weekly charts ===
Weekly chart performance for "Good Loyal Thots"
Chart (2023)	Peak position
New Zealand Hot Singles (RMNZ)	29
US Hot Dance/Electronic Songs (Billboard)	8

=== Year-end charts ===
Year-end chart performance for "Good Loyal Thots"
Chart (2023)	Position
US Hot Dance/Electronic Songs (Billboard)	16

== Certifications ==
Certifications for "Good Loyal Thots"
Region	Certification	Certified units/sales
Brazil (Pro-Música Brasil)	Gold	20,000^{‡}
Canada (Music Canada)	Gold	40,000^{‡}
United States (RIAA)	Platinum	1,000,000^{‡}
^{‡} Sales+streaming figures based on certification alone.
