= 6arelyhuman =

American singer

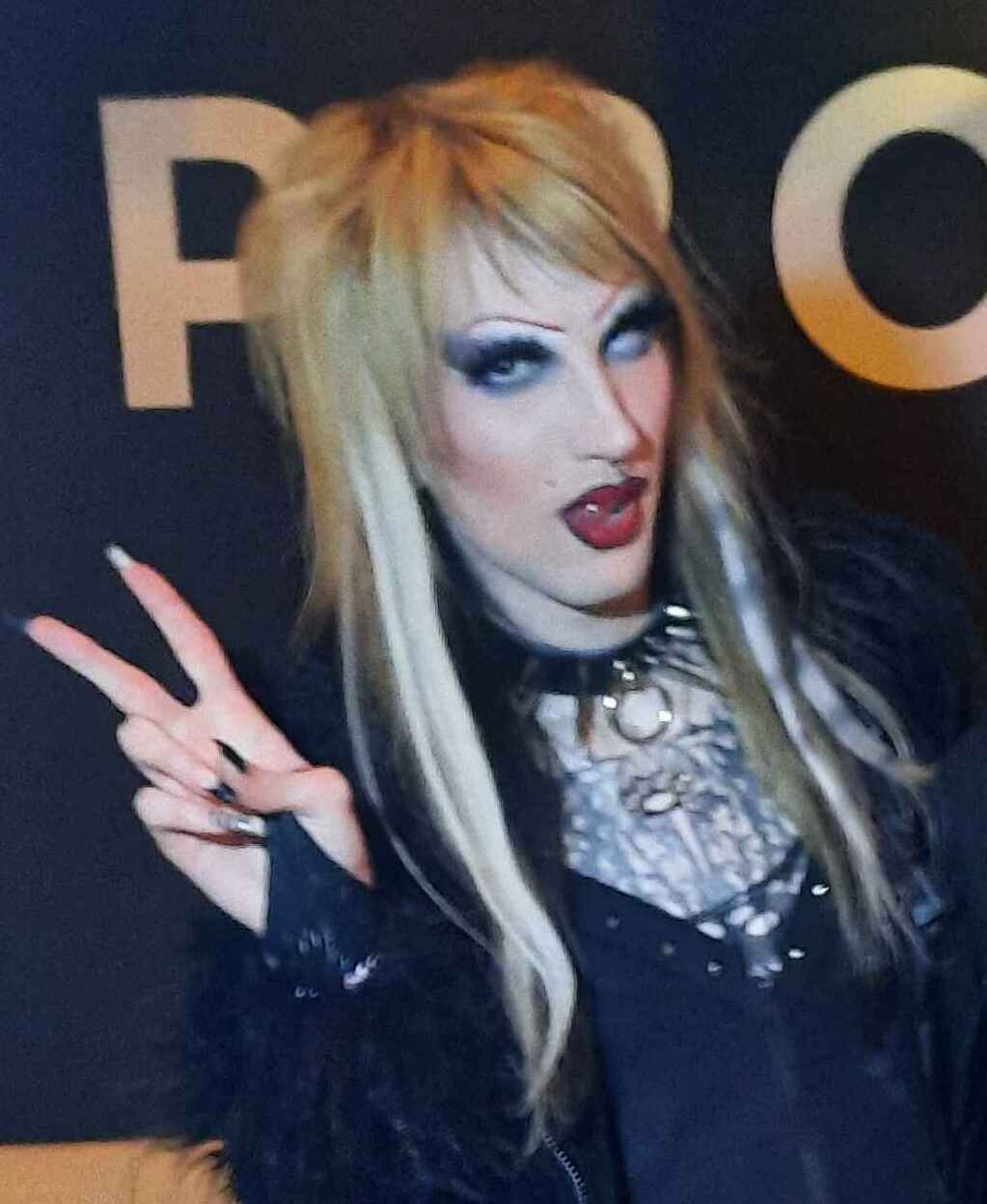
- Hamilton in 2024

Background information
- Born: Toby Aaron Hamilton; July 15, 2001 (age 25); Dallas, Texas, U.S.
- Genres: EDM; krushclub
- Occupations: Singer; rapper; songwriter
- Instrument: Vocals
- Years active: 2019–present
- Label: Artist Partner Group
- Formerly of: FabFantasy
- Website: 6arelyhuman.com

Toby Aaron Hamilton (born July 15, 2001), known professionally as 6arelyhuman (pronounced "barely human"), is an American singer, rapper and songwriter. In 2022, they (Note: Hamilton uses "they/them" pronouns.) released the single "Hands Up!" and "XOXO (Kisses Hugs)", which became viral hits on TikTok and led to their signing with Artist Partner Group.

Alongside a string of releases in 2023, Hamilton released their debut studio album, Sassy Scene. They followed it up with a collaboration with Odetari called "GMFU", which became their first top ten entry on the US Hot Dance/Electronic Songs chart, and was featured on their second extended play (EP) Myspace Addiction. Their second studio album, Internet Famous (2024), was supported by the single "Faster n Harder", which also became viral on TikTok.

== Early life ==
Born in Dallas, Texas, 6arelyhuman originally made edits of Japanese anime music videos on YouTube before pursuing music. Hamilton is a vegan. They have three sisters and a brother.

== Career ==
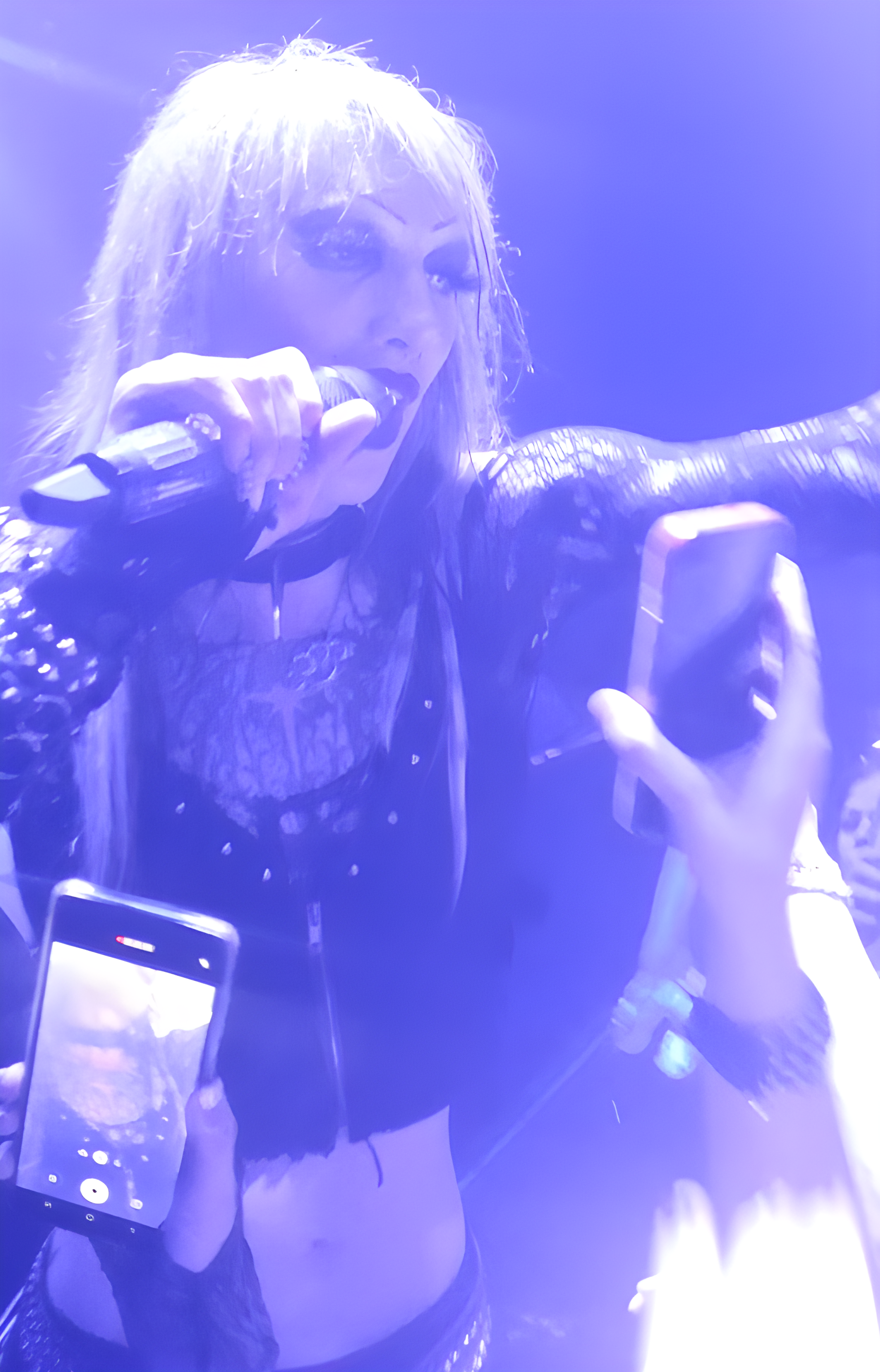
6arelyhuman performing in Warsaw, Poland, in 2024

In an interview with Billboard, 6arelyhuman claimed they were inspired by a South Park edit. Hamilton released "Hands Up!" with Kets4eki and Pixel Hood in 2022. The song became their first to chart on the Billboard Hot Dance/Electronic Songs chart, reaching number 14. Both "GMFU" and "Hands Up" went viral on TikTok, the former of which entered the top five of the Hot Dance/Electronic Songs chart. It also reached number 23 on New Zealand Music Chart, their only main chart debut. They released their debut studio album, Sassy Scene, on March 3, 2023. In 2024, they collaborated with Scene Queen on the song "Stuck". On February 28, 2024, Hamilton released "Faster n Harder", and remix versions were subsequently released. They embarked on a European tour in 2024, and announced a subsequent world tour.

== Musical style ==
Hamilton's music has been described as EDM and Krushclub, but they self-classify their music as "Sassy Scene". They have cited Kesha and Lady Gaga as inspirations. Hamilton is described as a scene artist.

== Discography ==
=== Studio albums ===
Title	Details
Sassy Scene	Released: March 3, 2023; Label: FabFantasy; Format: Digital download, streaming
Internet Famous	Released: April 3, 2024; Label: Artist Partner Group; Format: Digital download, streaming
Digital Dancer	Release date: August 21, 2026 (Note: Initially, a limited CD release of Digital Dancer was available on April 3, 2026. A worldwide digital release appeared on August 21, 2026.); Label: Self-released; Format: CD, digital download, streaming

=== Extended plays ===
Title	Details
Cyberspace	Released: September 1, 2022; Label: Anuba; Format: Digital download, streaming
Divinity (with Wydsonni)	Released: October 10, 2022; Label: Anuba; Format: Digital download, streaming
Myspace Addiction	Released: September 20, 2023; Label: Artist Partner Group; Format: Digital download, streaming
Swag (as Sassy Scene)	Released: November 19, 2024; Label: Artist Partner Group; Format: Digital download, streaming
Cute Songs for Gangsters (with Asteria)	Released: February 12, 2025; Label: Artist Partner Group; Format: Digital download, streaming

=== Charted songs ===
List of charted songs, with selected chart positions and certifications, showing year released and album name
Title	Year	Peak chart positions		Certifications	Album
Title	Year	US Dance	NZ Hot	Certifications	Album
"XOXO (Kisses Hugs)" (with Horrormovies and Pixel Hood)	2022	27	—		Myspace Addiction
"Hands Up!" (with Kets4eki and Pixel Hood)	2022	14	—		Sassy Scene
"GMFU" (with Odetari)	2023	5	35	RIAA: Platinum	XIII Sorrows and Myspace Addiction
"Faster n Harder" (solo or remixes with Asteria and Kets4eki, or with Tara Yummy)	2024	14	—		Internet Famous
"—" denotes a recording that did not chart in that territory.
