= 3x3 (EP) =

2023 collaborative EP by Odetari and 9lives

EP by Odetari and 9lives
- Released: July 12, 2023
- Recorded: 2023
- Studio: APG Studio (Los Angeles, California)
- Genres: Hyperpop, sigilkore
- Length: 6:00
- Label: Artist Partner Group
- Producer: 9lives

Odetari chronology
3x3 (2023)	XIII Sorrows (2023)

9lives chronology
33.1FM (2023)	3x3 (2023)	My Way (2024)

Singles from 3x3
- 1. "Reassure Me" Released: June 7, 2023

3x3 is a collaborative extended play (EP) by the American rapper Odetari and Kiwi record producer 9lives. It was released on July 12, 2023 by Artist Partner Group. After the pair aided in the popularization of the Sigilkore genre, they recorded the EP at the Artist Partner Group studio in Los Angeles, California. Prior to its release, Jardine had released his second EP, 33.1FM, in February 2023. Production was handled entirely by 9lives, who wrote the songs alongside Odetari. The project was promoted through two singles—"Reassure Me" and "I Love You Hoe". A chopped and screwed version of the EP was released on August 7, 2023, by on a side-account of Odetari managed by Artist Partner Group.

== Background and production ==
9lives and Odetari are both credited for the popularization of the Sigilkore genre; Katie Bain at Billboard had referred to the latter as a representation of the "DIY vibe" of the early rave era. Odetari later signed a multi-album record deal with Artist Partner Group following his rise to virality, while 9lives had signed to Kobalt. Bain would also call Odetari an "attention grabber" due to the all caps styling on the songs. Soon after the release of the extended play (EP), a track "I Love You Hoe" would quickly start gaining traction online on platforms such as TikTok, and become the duo's most popular track.

== Composition ==
3x3 is a digicore album, that incorporates elements of sigilkore. The slightly derails from Odetari's usual glitchy sound. In the EP, Odetari discusses topics of mental disorders, lust and others.

== Release and promotion ==
On June 7, 2023, Odetari and 9lives released the first and only single from the EP, "Reassure Me". "I Love You Hoe" would gain virality on TikTok, and be certified gold by the Recording Industry Association of America (RIAA). It would also reached the top three on the US Hot Dance/Electronic Songs chart, while on the NZ chart, "I Love You Hoe" had peaked at number 18 for two weeks. 3x3 was released on July 12, 2023, through Artist Partner Group for digital download and streaming. On August 7, 2023, the remix of the album featuring sped-up and slowed and reverbed renditions were released on the side-account of Odetari managed by Artist Partner Group. According to Odetari on his Kids Take Over interview, Trippie Redd had reached out to him saying that he wanted a feature on a song.

== Track listing ==
3x3 track listing (Note: The track list credits for discs 1 and 2 for Odecore Mix are still the same)
No.	Title	Writer(s)	Producer(s)	Length
1.	"I Love You Hoe"	Taha Ahmad; Maxwell Jardine	9lives	2:06
2.	"Ice Spice HMU"	Ahmad; Jardine	9lives	2:09
3.	"Reassure Me"	Ahmad; Jardine	9lives	1:47

Notes

- All tracks are stylized in uppercase.

== Personnel ==
Credits adapted from Tidal.

- Odetari – vocals, songwriting (all tracks)
- 9lives – songwriting, production (all tracks)

== Release history ==
Release dates and formats for 3x3
Region	Date	Format(s)	Version	Label	Ref.
Various	July 12, 2023	Digital download; streaming	Standard	Artist Partner Group	
Various	August 7, 2023	Sped up; slowed and reverbed	Standard	Artist Partner Group	
