= Kanii =

American singer and rapper (born 2005)

- Born: Kani Nkshon Shorter Jr. August 2, 2005 (age 21); Washington, D.C., U.S.
- Genres: Hip hop; emo rap; R&B; Hyperpop; Pop music
- Occupations: Rapper; singer; songwriter
- Works: Discography
- Years active: 2018–present
- Labels: Masked; Warner
- Awards: RIAA Platinum and Gold Certification(s), Music Canada Platinum Certification
- Website: warnerrecords.com/kanii

Kani Nkshon Shorter Jr. (born August 2, 2005), known professionally as Kanii, is an American singer, songwriter and rapper. Shorter rose to prominence with his 2023 single "I Know". The song peaked at number 90 on the Billboard Hot 100, and received a gold certification by the Recording Industry Association of America (RIAA). Later that same year, he released his debut extended play (EP), Exiit (2023), marking his first entry on the Billboard Top Dance Albums chart, peaking at number 10.

He first embarked on his musical career in 2018, with the release of song,"So Long" onto SoundCloud. Later in August 2022, Shorter would release "Attachment (She Wanna Love)", would gain virality on the platform TikTok. Releasing his debut extended play (EP) in 2023, it spawned the Billboard Hot Dance/Electronic-charting singles "Go" and "Heart Racing". In November 2023, Shorter released his seventh EP, It Was Nice Knowing U.

== Early life ==
Kani Nkshon Shorter Jr. was born on August 2, 2005, in Washington, D.C., U.S., to two parents of African-American descent. He grew up in a household full of music, with his mother and grandfather playing songs. Shorter would mention being put in church choir, describing it as "a gradual development" further going into detail, "just being into it so young, and then eventually, being put in programs and environments where it just made sense to start singing and stuff". As a teenager, he would upload his music to SoundCloud. Shorter attended Duke Ellington School of the Arts, where he graduated.

== Career ==
=== 2018–2022: Career beginnings, Attachment (She Wanna Love) ===
Before the beginning of Shorter's official career, around the age of twelve, he would record his music with a cheap microphone. In 2018, Kanii would release his first song, titled "So Long" to SoundCloud at 12 years old. In 2020, Kanii released his debut single, "Aubade". During 2022, his song "Attachment (She Wanna Love)" gained popularity on the video-sharing app TikTok.

=== 2023–present: exiit and it was nice knowing u ===
Following his signing to Masked and Warner Records, he would take a seven month hiatus. Kanii would release his single "I Know", his first release under Masked and Warner, in 2023. The song gained popularity on TikTok and charted at number 90 on the Billboard Hot 100, making it his first entry on the chart. On June 15, 2023, Kanii released his second EP exiit, along with a release show in Brooklyn, New York with Riovaz and Nimstarr. In 2024, Kanii would open for PinkPantheress' The Capable of Love Tour for 6 shows. He would later release his seventh extended play (EP) #BLUE in 2025.

== Artistry ==
=== Influences ===
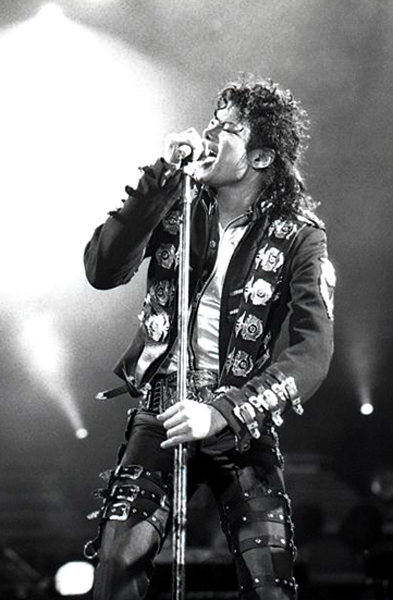
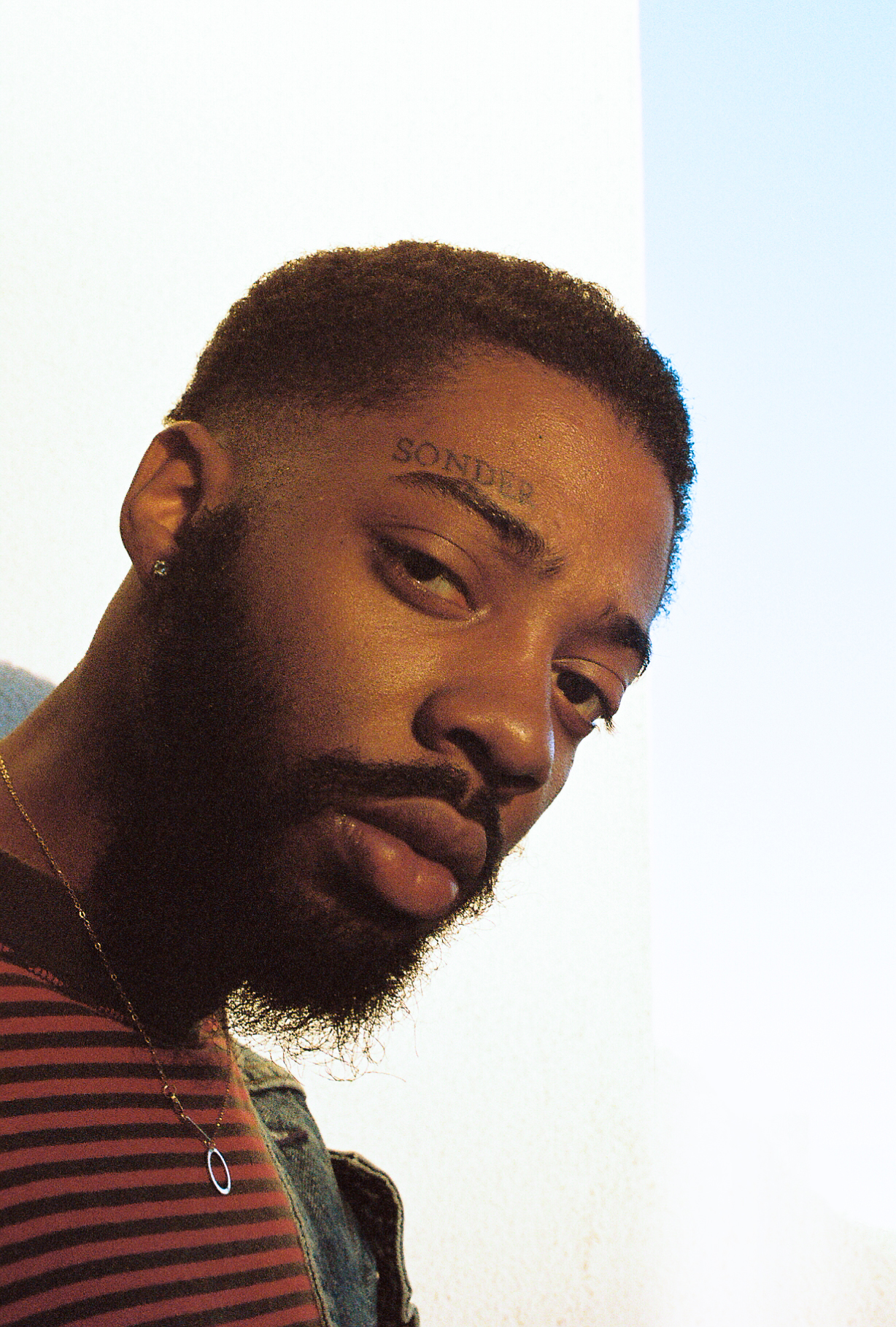
Kanii has cited artists such as Michael Jackson (left) and Brent Faiyaz (right) as his main influences.

Shorter has referred to multiple artists as influences to his musical talents, most notably Michael Jackson, Brent Faiyaz, XXXTentacion, and Juice Wrld. In an interview with Mesfin Fekadu writing for The Hollywood Reporter, Shorter would state Imogen Heap as one of his main influences; "Imogen Heap is a huge inspiration, especially her vocal production, and I try to incorporate the same level of care to my vocals”. Shorter also said in an interview with Paper Magazine that The Weeknd plays a role in his work: “I’m inspired a lot by The Weeknd and the way he presents his projects. Aesthetically, I think what he’s doing is really cool.”

=== Musical style ===
In an interview, Shorter would describe his musical style as “a captivating fusion of dance, pop and R&B elements." Further expressing that "embodied within my music are vibrant and rhythmic pop production nuances, accompanied by smooth and catchy vocal melodies." Multiple sources would describe his music as a mix between jersey club and modern R&B.

== Tours and Live Performances ==
Supporting

- RioRave Disturb the Norm Tour
- The Capable of Love Tour

=== Headlining ===
- Lightman Tour (2026)*
- Kanii US Tour (2026)
- Kanii Europe Tour (2026)*
- #BLUE Immersive Experience (2025)
- #BLUE TOUR (2025)
- it was nice knowing u Tour (2024)
- exiit EP Release Party (2023)

*cancelled, postponed, or upcoming
