= Odetari =

American rapper and singer (born 2000)

- Born: Taha Othman Ahmad; January 1, 2000 (age 26); Houston, Texas, U.S.
- Genres: Hip-hop; EDM; sigilkore; trap
- Occupations: Rapper; singer; songwriter; record producer
- Instrument: Vocals
- Years active: 2016–present
- Label: APG
- Website: odetari.com

Taha Othman Ahmad (born January 1, 2000), also known as Odetari, is an American rapper, singer, songwriter, and record producer. He started making and releasing music at age 13. His music became popular on TikTok in 2023 and his songs "Good Loyal Thots", "Narcissistic Personality Disorder", "Look Don't Touch", "I Love You Hoe", "GMFU", and "Hypnotic Data" all reached the top 3 of the Billboard Hot Dance/Electronic Songs chart and were each certified gold by the Recording Industry Association of America (RIAA). Ahmad is of Palestinian origin.

== Life and career ==
Taha Othman Ahmad was born on January 1, 2000, in Houston, Texas and is of Palestinian descent. His father owns a valet parking service, where Othman worked for three years before being laid off by his father during the COVID-19 pandemic. He started producing and releasing SoundCloud rap music at age 13 with a Native Instruments Maschine given to him by his parents, and later produced trap beats starting in 2016. Before starting music, he worked at a Starbucks, but left due to his addiction to Xanax at the time.

Othman's stage name, Odetari, is a fusion of his family name, Odeh, with the name of video game developer Atari. Odetari self-released his debut single, "Good Loyal Thots", in March 2023. While working as a substitute teacher at a Houston high school in 2023, Odetari's music became popular on TikTok due to his videos of audio deepfakes of video game characters, which used his songs in the background. After getting fired from the high school, he began releasing songs on SoundCloud more frequently and using them in his TikTok videos. His song "Narcissistic Personality Disorder" became his first to chart when it debuted at number 11 on the Billboard Hot Dance/Electronic Songs chart in April 2023; it also became his top-10 debut on the chart the following month.

Odetari gave his first live performance in June 2023 in New York City. In July 2023, he released his debut EP 3×3, a collaboration with New Zealand record producer 9lives, and signed a multi-album record deal with Artist Partner Group. Soon after signing him, the label created a second Spotify account for sped-up and slowed down remixes for his songs, as well as instrumental music under the name Odecore. He had topped the Dance/Electronic Songwriters chart for 17 weeks by September 2023. He released his debut EP, XIII Sorrows, on September 13, 2023. The EP was later released as an LP on Artist Partner Group's official website. A Trippie Redd remix of his collaborative single "I Love You Hoe" with 9lives was released in October 2023. Throughout 2023, 11 of his songs charted on the Billboard Hot Dance/Electronic Songs chart.

Odetari's EP, Door to Dusk, was released in December 2023 with a release party held on Roblox. As of February 2024, he has over two million followers on TikTok. Following a mistake in the credits of "Coldest Winter", Odetari would collaborate with Hongjoong of Ateez on "SMB", which faced backlash with a controversy following the fact that it is a diss-track towards Hybe Corporation. He would later collaborate with Zero Zero Entertainment to release a comic book titled Odetari: The Hidden Gate.

== Musical style ==
Odetari's music has been described as EDM and sigilkore, a microgenre combining plugg and hyperpop. Odetari has referred to his music as "Odecore". He has described it as "final boss music". Ethan Shanfeld of Variety wrote that his combine "pitched-up rap hooks, glitchy trap flare and menacing club beats" and are "tailored to a young, overstimulated audience" due to their shorter length. Katie Bain wrote for Billboard that his music was "hectic and woozy and strange, altogether giving a feeling like being at a rave happening inside the internet" and that he and singer 6arelyhuman both represented "the DIY vibe of the early rave era and the ultra-modern world of TikTok stardom". He has called chopped and screwed music and Travis Scott inspirations for his music.

== Discography ==
I am a blackhole (Star)

- Phazon Varia (2026)

== Awards and nominations ==
List of awards and nominations received by Odetari
Award	Year	Nominee(s)	Category	Result	Ref.
Billboard Music Awards	2024	XIII Sorrows	Top Dance/Electronic Album	Nominated	
