= Artist Partner Group =

Independent record label

- Founded: 2013
- Founder: Mike Caren
- Distributor: ADA
- Genre: Various
- Country of origin: United States
- Location: Los Angeles, California
- Official website: artistpg.com

Artist Partner Group, Inc. (APG) is an American record label and music publishing company founded by Mike Caren in 2013, who is chief executive officer (CEO). The label's parent company, Artist Publishing Group, publishes its releases. It was an entity of Atlantic Records and Warner Records from its establishment until 2020.

== History ==
Artist Partner Group was founded in 2013 by music executive Mike Caren. The group is a sub-platform to Artist Publishing Group, which was founded by Caren earlier in 2007. Both entities are collectively known as APG.

Artist Partner Group originally began as a joint venture with Atlantic Records and Warner Music Group. Over eight years, the label became known for signing artists such as YoungBoy Never Broke Again, Charlie Puth, Kehlani, Ava Max, Kevin Gates, Jason Derulo, NLE Choppa, Britney Manson, Don Toliver, Alec Benjamin, Bazzi, Lil Skies, Faouzia and Rico Nasty.

In November 2020, APG ended their eight-year joint venture with Atlantic Records to go fully independent and partner with ADA.
