= No Turning Back =

No Turning Back may refer to:

== Politics ==
- No Turning Back (political group), a group within the British Conservative Party

== Music ==
=== Albums ===
- No Turning Back (Brandon Heath album), 2015
- No Turning Back (Burning Starr album), 1986
- No Turning Back, by Calyx, 2005
- No Turning Back, by Dan McCafferty, 2023
- No Turning Back (Imelda May album), 2003
- No Turning Back (Out of Eden album), 1999
- No Turning Back, by Hilton Schilder, 2003
- No Turning Back, by Ian Stuart Donaldson, 1989
- No Turning Back, by Jersey, 1998
- No Turning Back, by Jimi Hocking's band Jimi the Human & Spectre 7, 1990
- No Turning Back, by Kevin Borich Express, 1979
- No Turning Back: 1985–2005, a DVD collection by Glass Tiger
- No Turning Back, by Pz', 2026

=== Songs ===
- "No Turning Back", by Blyss feat. Krystal Davis, 1986
- "No Turning Back", by This Beautiful Republic, 2008
- "No Turning Back", by Cliff Richard and the Drifters from Serious Charge, 1959
- "No Turning Back", by DJ Sneak from Fabric 62, 2012
- "No Turning Back", by Figure fromMonsters, Vol. 3, 2012
- "No Turning Back", by John Deacon with the Immortals from the soundtrack album for Biggles, 1986
- "No Turning Back", by Hed PE from Evolution, 2014
- "No Turning Back", by Proper Dos from Mexican Power, 1992
- "No Turning Back", by Romeo (Park Jung Min) from Midnight Theatre, 2012
- "No Turning Back", by Sarah Blasko from As Day Follows Night, 2009
- "No Turning Back", by Shannon Noll from No Turning Back: The Story So Far, 2008
- "No Turning Back", by the Sherbs from The Skill, 1980
- "No Turning Back", by Stormtroopers of Death from Live at Budokan, 1992
- "No Turning Back", by Stratovarius from Destiny, 1998
- "No Turning Back", by Trish Thuy Trang from Trish, 2005
- "No Turning Back", by Ultravox from Revelation, 1993
- "No Turning Back", by the Unseen from The Anger and the Truth, 2001

== Television ==
- "No Turning Back", an episode of Drive (2007 TV series)
- "No Turning Back", an episode of The Beast (2009 TV series)
- "No Turning Back", an episode of the 2009 TV series DietTribe

== Literature ==
- No Turning Back, a 1964 book by Polingaysi Qöyawayma
- No Turning Back: A Novel of South Africa, a 1995 book by Beverley Naidoo
- No Turning Back: The History of Feminism and the Future of Women, a 2002 book by Estelle Freedman
- No Turning Back: The Life and Death of Animal Species, a 2004 book by Richard Ellis (biologist)
- No Turning Back, a 2006 book by Joanne Lees
- No Turning Back: One Man's Inspiring True Story of Courage, Determination, and Hope, a 2011 book by Bryan Anderson (author)

== See also ==
- Best of the Best 3: No Turning Back, a 1995 martial arts action film directed by Phillip Rhee
