= Slime Language 3 =

- Side B and official streaming platforms cover art

Compilation album by YSL Records and Young Thug
- Released: August 28, 2026
- Length: 134:31
- Labels: YSL; Create
- Producers: 5kjordn; Aaron Shadrow; Ajax; Aviator Keyyz; BabyXD; Blssd; D1xoo; DJ Cash; Drew Sliger; FBG Goat; FearDorian; Giovijohn; Honorable C.N.O.T.E.; Ibvijohn; Iyrus; Jasper Harris; Kaigoinkrazy; Krager; Klimax; Lambda; London on da Track; Luc1us; Mike Will Made It; Money Musik; Project4Play; Pi'erre Bourne; Smoke55fr; Taurus; Trev; Wheezy

YSL Records chronology
Slime Language 2 (2021)	Slime Language 3 (2026)

Young Thug chronology
UY Scuti (2025)	Slime Language 3 (2026)	GoldMoufDog (TBA)

Singles from Slime Language 3
- 1. "Consummate" Released: August 25, 2026; 2. "Hood of Atlanta" Released: August 26, 2026

Side A cover

Slime Language 3 is the third collaborative compilation album by American record label YSL Records in conjunction with its leader, American rapper Young Thug. The label and Create Music Group released it on August 28, 2026. The album features appearances from signees BSlime, Tezzus, Diamond*, Sk8star, 1300Saint, Biggs Money, Lil Unky, Iyrus, Yume, Unfoonk, Yung Kayo, and the late Lil Keed, with further outside appearances from Rob49, Quavo, Lil Baby, Papito El Franklins, Travis Scott, Future, Yeat, Veeze, Lito the Plug, Skrilla, Rundown Zay, Cash Cobain, HittMan, Jorjiana, Trippie Redd, Pz', Bay Swag, Mariah the Scientist, YKNiece, and Lil Righteous. Production was handled by Iyrus himself, alongside Wheezy, Mike Will Made It, Honorable C.N.O.T.E., and Pi'erre Bourne, among others.

Slime Language 3 was preceded by its singles "Hood of Atlanta", which features diamond* and Tezzus, and "Consummate", which features the latter, Thug himself, and 1300Saint. It serves as the final installment of the Slime Language album trilogy, following the first album in 2018 and its sequel (also in collaboration with now-former label signee Gunna) in 2021. The album also serves as the first project to be released by YSL since Lil Keed's passing in 2022, as well as Gunna's departure from the label in 2025 after his longtime friendship with Thug ended after the racketeering trial involving several artists and associates from the label from 2022 to 2024, due to the latter accusing him of taking the stand against him in the courtroom.

Upon release, Slime Language 3 generated mixed to positive reviews from music journalists, with them criticizing the bloated tracklist, but also expressing praise for its energy and shift towards a new generation, and its impact on the newer style and generation of hip-hop music. Upon release, it sold 11,000 album equivalent units and debuted at #146 on the Billboard 200. Thug and multiple other YSL artists are currently embarking on the New Generation Tour in support of the project.

== Background and recording ==
The idea for Slime Language 3 first surfaced on May 16, 2026, when American rapper and YSL signee 1300Saint mentioned the project during an appearance on American online streamer PlaqueBoyMax's live stream. He followed up with another tease on X two days later, beginning a rollout that would remain relatively quiet before accelerating in August. In June, Young Thug would explain the sound of the project via an interview, where he stated that it would sound similar to 2016 music and his debut commercial mixtape, Barter 6 (2015). Thug explicitly revealed the album through an Instagram post in a video conversation with American audio engineer and record producer Mike Dean, where they said the recording process was complete. 1300Saint revealed five days later that the album would have over 30 tracks. An album trailer was revealed with its release date. It was originally scheduled to be released at midnight Eastern Time Zone (ET). Still, it was delayed until the evening after Thug revealed that he and his signees were in the hospital to watch the birth of American stylist and creative consultant Ian Connor's child. Following the delay, Diamond* would give an update on the official YSL Instagram page, revealing that the project would see a release soon and that signees and affiliates were still working diligently on the project. Furthermore, Thug would then go on X to announce that the project would have some minor changes to it.

== Composition ==
=== Overview ===
Slime Language 3 is a rage and trap album with some melodic senses along it. It is a compilation album and serves as the third and final installment of the Slime Language series. Containing a total of 41 tracks, the project a double album and is split into two discs, side A and Side B, which both have 21 and 20 tracks respectively. The album features guest appearances from new label mates in Tezzus, diamond*, Sk8star, 1300Saint, Yung Kayo, Unfoonk, iyrus, BSlime, Biggs Money, Lil Unky, Yume, and the late Lil Keed, while also bringing in Pz', Lil Baby, Yeat, Travis Scott, Future, Trippie Redd, Quavo, Cash Cobain, Jorjiana, Bay Swag, Mariah the Scientist, YKNiece, Veeze, Skrilla, Rob49, Rundown Zay, Papito El Franklins, Lito The Plug, HittMan, and Lil Righteous. According to Narsimha Gour Chintaluri of Pitchfork, he labeled Side A as a "mosh pit" side that should be heard at a Cole Bennett festival while Side B features a more whimsical side and is more meant for shower singing. According to Aron A of HotNewHipHop, he wrote how the album seeks to bridge the gap between underground rap fans and mainstream rap fans, while focusing more on the youth while bringing in mainstream favorites to maintain balance. According to Zabih Safdari of laut.de, he wrote how Slime Language 3 is "135 minutes of pure chaos" that has no structure whatsoever across 41 tracks.

=== Composition ===
==== Side A ====
The seven-minute opening track "Gotta Love Us" is a soporific melodic trap song that sees Young Thug recruit Pz', diamond*, Tezzus, and BSlime. On the track, Pz' hits his notes on the intro, BSlime takes the chorus, and Tezzus employs mush-mouthed syllable play. Across the track, Thug, Tezzus, and diamond* are sparsely featured throughout despite having "solid verses" and being main names for the project. Armon Sadler of Billboard called "ØWAYSL" a fun and "posse loaded track", the track features Sk8star, BSlime, Tezzus, and adds Rob49 in the mix, where BSlime has a very polished flow with his vocal inflections, and Thug takes to majority of the track with his long verse. On Rob49's part, Sadler called it a weak back half, stating that his repeating sequence of the verse and chorus is memorable but tries to see him replicate Thug, which Sadler said wasn't "his best outing", despite having potential with it. On a "fun" beat for "What's Up Mami", the trio of Tezzus, BSlime, and Thug repeats the title line and features a long, high octave chorus by Tezzus with a weaker verse from BSlime and Thug. On "Mob Guys", Thug teams with Quavo, Biggs Money, and Lil Unky" where the track comes in at a run time of two minutes and 24 seconds and features "undeniable charisma", which lifts the track to a "high-octane caper". "Function" features church organs and video game synths which features signature screeches and pocket manipulation by Thug and a repetitive yet catchy chorus by Unky. "Club Outside", Thug teams up with Lil Baby, which sees the two rap over a "frantic trap beat. "Wait For It" sees BSlime and Papito El Franklins team with Thug for a track reminiscent to the 2000s' Roscoe Dash and Metro Boomin's A Futuristic Summa with its vibrant production. "Eaters" is a rage track which sees Thug feature a star studded line up of Yeat, Tezzus, Travis Scott, and Future, however the production on it unremarkable and features "mailed in" and "half-hearted verses".

On "Grandma's Baby," BSlime and Thug recruit Veeze for a strong storytelling song which also showcases strong verses and vulnerability throughout. While "Black Friday" showcases Thug's dexterity and his chemistry with Lito The Plug. "Myself" features more recent and gruffer vocals from Thug and a defiant yet simple verse from Biggs Money. On the "ØWay Remix" of Tezzus' original track, Thug brings in a more earworm-like melodic approach. "YSL" sees Thug rap with Yume, who has a light-sounding yet rich enough voice to make the track stand out. On "Crocodile Skin", Rundown Zay joins BSlime and Thug, which saw BSlime excel, while on "Tezzus & Diamond*", it sees the self titled duo join arms with Cash Cobain, Thug and Quavo, to rap seamlessly together over a "menacing beat". "Shawty Shawty" sees Thug and HittMan aggressively approach a sped up instrumental reminiscent of Chris Brown's track "Poppin'". On "Biggest Since Michael Jack" sees Thug work with Jorjiana, Sk8star, and Lito, where on the track, the trio provided a structured base while Jorjiana sends audacious bars. On the shortest track "We Dead", it sees Thug bring in Trippie Redd and Papito on the two minute and three second track, Sadler wrote how the track features "excellent A&Ring, he also said how Trippie and Papito's "rage DNA" fits the theme of the song. On the seven minute "Bvlgari", which also serves as the closing track to "Side A", Thug brings in iyrus, Tezzus, Lito, Biggs, and Yung Kayo, which features a strong structural chorus and nine verses. Each YSL signee showed out, mimicking each other's flows and cadences with ease, according to Sadler.

==== Side B ====
Side B opens up with "Believe It", featuring Pz', Unky, and Iyrus. It is the oldest recorded track by Thug, and features a weary, yet anthemic vibe to it according to Chintaluri. Sadler said the track's vibe was "refreshing" with the track featuring a more "bop-like BPM". On "Cha Nay Nay", Thug works with the Ø Way founders Tezzus and Diamond* where on the track, they rap about the Chanel brand, Chintaluri called it an electric jam that sees the trio work very well together while having atonal aggression and sassy affirmations throughout, the track features clashing vocals and ad-libs throughout which made it a less-favorable track for Sadley. On the lead single "Consummate", Thug works with Tezzus and 1300Saint, it is a rage song which sees Tezzus and Saint complement Thug's flow. "Tonight" sees diamond* and Saint join Thug for a track filled with "immersive" production and "true flow state" from Saint and diamond* On "NaNaNa", Tezzus, diamond*, and Sk8star join Thug for a flirty, synth-heavy rage track, which Sadley called an "organized chaos" track, it sees diamond* and Sk8star feature loose flows utilizing clever bars and wordplay. According to Chintaluri, he wrote about how Tezzus and diamond*'s vocals unearth a "Vishal Shekhar-coded melody" while Sk8star debriefs his state of finance. On "Say Dat", Thug joins Saint and Iyrus, which sees Iyrus' "Caribbean energy" for the production and theme of the song. On "Baddies", Thug joins Biggs and Cash Cobain which sees them approach a more club-anthemic vibe to rap about beautiful women. "Birthday" replaces Biggs with Bay Swag and sees the trio of Cash, Bay, and Thug rap about their hedonistic life while matching the energy of the "energetic beat". "Switch Up" sees Thug's fiancé Mariah the Scientist join him on the track alongside Unky and BSlime, it is an R&B and more emotional cut compared to the others despite this, Chintaluri called it the album's one of the worst cuts. "Weird" is a love track, and a "Jeffery-coded mixtape" according to Chintaluri. "Freaky Girl" sees Thug be with Iyrus and diamond*, while "Bounce It" invites YKNiece for a DJ-vibe, "booty shaking anthem."

"Snakes On My Collar" sees Thug and diamond* invite the late Lil Keed for a track that pays homage to three eras of YSL while being a convergence of styles from the three. The track's chorus sees Thug utilize his deep voice while transitioning to a whisper flow, while diamond*'s verse incorporates hilarious rap lines, while Keed's verse and flow "floats over the spacey beat". "Stole It From Us" sees Tezzus pay homage to Thug while Iyrus, diamond*, and Saint feature "great performances" over a "vibrational beat", Sadley called the track a "heartwarming song". "Fernando Mendoza" sees Sk8star, Thug, Tezzus, and Unky reference the NFL player of the same name, simultaneously, on the track, Tezzus also mentions his label-mate diamond* and Jorjiana as Mendoza played for Indiana University Bloomington and Jorjiana is from Indiana. Overall, the track sees the squad match the energy very well. "Countin Up" sees Thug link with Lil Righteous to rap about money; the track features catchy hooks and nimble verses. "Skyami" sees Thug, Lito, Kayo, and Tezzus maintain a solid pace while having structural verses and "Lil Bruh with Biggs features defiant vocals and stylistic choice lands as a as a "symbolic acknowledgement" just as "Myself" did. "Losing Sleep" sees Thug with Yume and diamond*, with diamond* and Yume providing star-studded verses. Safdari called it calm and melodic. The closer track on Side B and on the album "What It Do" with Thug's brother Unfoonk takes a more sentimental and heartfelt approach rapping about their life and struggles while yearning for trust, battles with pride, reflection on their loyalty to the streets and more, the track also showcases Thug's melodic side especially on the hooks which Sadler called "beautiful and puts the bow on a very good disc two".

== Release and promotion ==
The idea of Slime Language 3 first surfaced in May 2026. The album was preceded by two lead singles, with the first, "Consummate", with Tezzus, 1300Saint, and Thug, being released on August 25, 2026, with "Hood of Atlanta", featuring Tezzus & Diamond*, released a day after. Following some album setbacks and tweaks, the album was ultimately released on August 28, 2026, with two sides. A day after the album's release, a music video for "Mob Guys" was issued on YouTube. In support of the album, a tour for it was issued and announced before the album's release. Dubbed the "YSL New Generation Tour", it features appearances from Thug, alongside Nav and YSL signees Tezzus, Diamond*, 1300Saint, Iyrus, Yume, Biggs, and Unky. The tour began in September and concludes in October, with the tour stretching from North America and Europe.

== Critical reception ==
Professional ratings
Review scores
Source	Rating
AllMusic	2.5/5 stars
Pitchfork	7.3/10
laut.de	3/5 stars

Slime Language 3 generated mixed to positive reviews from media critics. According to Aron A of HotNewHipHop, he criticized the album's length, lack of cohesion, and Thug's diminished artistic presence; despite this, he expressed appreciation for the new YSL roster, rage and underground influence, and the album's role in rebuilding YSL following the YSL Records racketeering trial. Narsimha Gour Chintaluri of Pitchfork rated the album a 7.3 out of ten. Chintaluri said the project is a strong, fascinating rebuild rather than a classic; Thug still has his great moments, and the rising YSL era of artists brings excitement to the table. Like Aron A, he praises the direction YSL is trying to head in following its RICO trial, but, like Aron A, the 41-song length, weaker obligatory tracks, and mostly unremarkable production keep it from being great.

Armon Sadler of Billboard wrote that Slime Language 3 is a successful showcase of YSL's next generation, with a surprisingly strong collection of individual songs, but one with serious consistency and length problems. His strong highlights off the album were "Grandma's Baby" and "Black Friday". In a less favorable review, Zabih Safdari of laut.de wrote how messy, excessively long compilation with some genuinely good new artists buried inside it. he praised Thug's chaotic and creative energy while labeling Diamond* as an album standout off the album. He also praised the A&R and label work behind it while praising Thug's ability to find the new promising future in the rising YSL artists. In similar fashion as Safdari, the TiVo staff at AllMusic rated the album a 2.5 out of five, keeping it brief, they wrote how the project has its lighter and more playful moments as seen in "Function" or the "shimmering" "Biggest Since Michael Jack" amidst all the blown-out, hard-edged trap and rage tracks. On their "best albums of 2026 so far" ranking, Slime Language 3 was labeled as one of the best projects of August.

== Commercial performance ==
Slime Language 3 debuted at #146 on the Billboard 200, earning 11,000 album-equivalent units in its first week. It did the worst out of the trilogy, with Slime Language 2 debuting at one on the chart, selling 113,000 units, and Slime Language debuting at eight, selling 41,000 units in its first week.

== Track listing ==
Side A track listing
No.	Title	Writer(s)	Producer(s)	Length
1.	"Gotta Love Us" (featuring Bslime, Tezzus, Diamond*, and Pz')	Jeffery Williams; Jaborious Martin; T'Corrian Walton; Misonn Scott; Papayusupha Njie; Wesley Glass; Mokhom Singh Bhangal; Darius Poviliūnas; Nikita Murenets	Wheezy; Money Musik; WonderYo; Splitted Stupid	7:15
2.	"ØWAYSL" (featuring BSlime, Tezzus, Sk8star, and Rob49)	J. Williams; Martin; Walton; J'Corey King; Robert Thomas; Jordan McDonald	Project4Play; DrewMfs	4:24
3.	"What's Up Mami" (featuring Tezzus and Biggs Money)	J. Williams; Martin; Quandravius Jewell; DeAndre McKee; Jordan McDonald; Bernard Chavez II	1300Saint; Project4Play; Bezo; Kwakz; Kxbe66	3:58
4.	"Mob Guys" (featuring Quavo, Biggs Money, and Lil Unky)	Quavious Marshall; Jewell; Quantez Bland; Jalan Lowe; Jason Rosenberg	Lil 88; Rosen Beatz	2:24
5.	"Function" (featuring Lil Unky)	J. Williams; Bland; Michael Williams Jr.	Mike Will Made It	2:44
6.	"Club Outside" (featuring Lil Baby)	J. Williams; Dominique Jones; London Holmes; Joshua Luellen	London on da Track; Southside	2:47
7.	"Wait for It" (featuring Papito El Franklins and BSlime)	DeAndre Charles; Martin; Jonas Lee; Artem Kulikov	Uchi; Youknowscarly	2:08
8.	"Eaters" (featuring Travis Scott, Future, Yeat and Tezzus)	J. Williams; Jacques Webster II; Nayvadius Wilburn; Walton; Martell Smith-Williams; Will Halper	FBG Goat; BabyXD	4:21
9.	"Grandma's Baby" (featuring BSlime and Veeze)	Martin; Karon Vantrees; Giorgi Mikeltadze; Illia Badanov	Giovijohn; Ibvijohn	3:12
10.	"Black Friday" (featuring Lito the Plug)	J. Williams; Adrian Powers; Luca Urbaniak; Mathias Thauthofer	WayTooLost; Thats Loyalty	2:50
11.	"Myself" (featuring Biggs Money)	J. Williams; Jewell; Jean Day Jr.; Adrian Brown	Truebeatzz; Aye Shark!	2:54
12.	"Ønly Øway" (featuring Skrilla, Tezzus, and RundownZay)	Jemille Edwards; Walton; Isaiah Williams; Julia Alexa; Vladimir Rainysh	Alexa; 223morte	2:18
13.	"Hood of Atlanta" (featuring Tezzus & Diamond*)	Walton; Scott; Dorian Williams	FearDorian	2:10
14.	"Øway Remix" (featuring Tezzus)	J. Williams; Walton; Austin Giwa; Delali Amenyenu; Jordan Church	Krager; D1xoo; 5kjordn	4:54
15.	"YSL" (featuring Yume)	J. Williams; Yume van der Meer	Yume	3:15
16.	"Crocodile Skin" (featuring Bslime and RundownZay)	Martin; I. Williams; Jasper Harris; Andrew Sliger; Aaron Shadrow; Anand Joshi	Harris; Sliger; Shadrow; Ajax	2:34
17.	"Tezzus & Diamond*" (featuring Quavo, Tezzus, Diamond*, and Cash Cobain)	Marshall; Walton; Scott; Cashmere Small; Ciaran Mullan; Dylan Cleary-Krell	Mu Lean; Dez Wright	3:08
18.	"Shawty Shawty" (featuring HittMan)	J. Williams; Brian Bailey	HittMan	2:37
19.	"Biggest Since Michael Jack" (featuring Jorjiana, Lito the Plug, and Sk8star)	Jorja Faith-Wilson; Powers; King; Urbaniak; Thauthofer	WayTooLost	3:42
20.	"We Dead" (featuring Trippie Redd and Papito El Franklins)	J. Williams; Michael White II; Charles; Bhangal; Lucius Lowe	Money Musik; Luc1us	1:57
21.	"Bvlgari" (featuring Iyrus, Tezzus, Lito the Plug, Biggs Money, Yung Kayo, and Lil Unky)	J. Williams; Enji Ojukwu; Walton; Powers; Jewell; Kai Green; Bland; Jordan Jenks	Pi'erre Bourne	7:42
Total length:				72:45

Side B
No.	Title	Writer(s)	Producer(s)	Length
22.	"Believe That" (featuring Pz', Lil Unky, and Iyrus)	J. Williams; Njie; Bland; Ojukwu; Zairyus Jackson	Kacey Khaliel; Rizzy Porter; nvm_ij	4:00
23.	"Cha Ney Ney" (featuring Tezzus & Diamond*)	J. Williams; Walton; Scott; Lee; Maxwell Madejczyk	Uchi; Kyuro	3:36
24.	"Consummate" (featuring 1300Saint and Tezzus)	J. Williams; McKee; Walton; McDonald; Joshi; Lambda; Trev	Project4Play; Ajax; Lambda; Trev	3:00
25.	"Tonight" (featuring Diamond* and 1300Saint)	J. Williams; Scott; McKee; Carlton Mays Jr.	Honorable C.N.O.T.E.	2:08
26.	"NaNaNa" (featuring Tezzus, Sk8star, and Diamond*)	J. Williams; Walton; King; Scott; McDonald; Klimax; Smoke55fr	Project4Play; Klimax; Smoke55fr	2:43
27.	"Say Dat" (featuring 1300Saint and Iyrus)	J. Williams; McKee; Ojukwu; Tariq Sharrieff; Eduardo Burgess; Jonathan de la Rosa	Blssd; Billboard Hitmakers	3:16
28.	"Baddies" (featuring Biggs Money and Cash Cobain)	J. Williams; Jewell; Small; Madejczyk; Bhangal	Kyuro; Money Musik	2:38
29.	"Birthday" (featuring Bay Swag and Cash Cobain)	J. Williams; Lloyd McKenzie; Small	1sanjay808; Twentysix	3:01
30.	"Switch Up" (featuring Mariah the Scientist, Lil Unky, and Bslime)	J. Williams; Mariah Buckles; Bland; Martin; Taurus Currie Jr.; Brian Campi	Taurus; Casper1of1	3:29
31.	"Weird" (featuring Biggs Money and Lil Unky)	J. Williams; Jewell; Bland; Joshi; Chavez; Feliciano Ponce; Harissis Tsakmaklis; Luzian Tuetsch; David Blanco	Ajax; Bezo; LAF Collective; Blanco	4:09
32.	"Freaky Girl" (featuring Iyrus and Diamond*)	J. Williams; Ojukwu; Scott; Bhangal	Iyrus; Money Musik	2:35
33.	"Bounce It" (featuring Biggs Money and YKNiece)	Jewell; Shanice Cameron; Zachary Thomas	Budda Beats	4:12
34.	"Snakes on My Collar" (featuring Diamond* and Lil Keed)	J. Williams; Scott; Raqhid Render	Aviator Keyyz	2:52
35.	"Stole It from Us" (featuring Tezzus, 1300Saint, Iyrus, and Diamond*)	J. WIlliams; Walton; McKee; Ojukwu; Scott; Jenks	Iyrus; Pi'erre Bourne	3:33
36.	"Fernando Mendoza" (featuring Tezzus, Sk8star, and Lil Unky)	J. Williams; Walton; King; Bland; McDonald; Joshi	Project4Play; Ajax	2:19
37.	"Countin Up" (featuring Lil Righteous)	J. Williams; Brian Zanders; Bhangal; Lowe	Money Musik; Luc1us	2:23
38.	"Skyami" (featuring Tezzus, Yung Kayo, and Lito the Plug)	J. Williams; Walton; Green; Powers; Currie	Taurus; NoStyle; 1sanjay808; TPerc; Twentysix	2:15
39.	"Lil Bruh" (featuring Biggs Money)	J. Williams; Jewell; Currie; Kai Hasegawa; Lucas DePante; Patrick Newton	Taurus; Kaigoinkrazy; Juke Wong; Swirv	3:19
40.	"Losing Sleep" (featuring Yume and Diamond*)	van der Meer; Scott	Yume	3:05
41.	"What It Do" (featuring Unfoonk)	J. Williams; Quantavius Grier; Cory Cole	DJ Cash	2:27
Total length:				61:08

== Charts ==
Chart performance for Slime Language 3
Chart (2026)	Peak position
US Billboard 200	146
US Independent Albums (Billboard)	18
US Top R&B/Hip-Hop Albums (Billboard)	47

== Release history ==
Release history for Slime Language 3Release history
Date	Format(s)	Edition(s)	Label	Ref.
August 28, 2026	Digital download; streaming	Standard	Create; YSL	
September 1, 2026	CD	Standard	Create; YSL	
