= Bling Slime Vøl 1 =

Bling Slime Vøl 1: Høsted by DJ Holiday

Mixtape by Diamond*
- Released: July 8, 2026
- Genres: Rage; trap
- Length: 25:52
- Labels: Atlantic Records; YSL Records
- Producers: 90lumiere; Bhristo; Brav06; Funkay; Godfoggy; Kat Lightning; Luc1us; Nate Varter; Phil; Philippe Goudiaby; Southboy; Thr6x; TTM Kid; Tyekoo; Zaan; Zaydntdoit

Diamond* chronology
UY Scuti Bøyz (2026)	Bling Slime Vøl 1: Høsted by DJ Holiday (2026)

Deluxe cover

Bling Slime Vøl 1: Høsted by DJ Holiday (stylized in all caps) is a surprise released mixtape by American rapper Diamond*, released on July 8, 2026, through Atlantic and YSL Records. Hosted by DJ Holiday, the mixtape marks his second major release of the year following the release of UY Scuti Bøyz, a collaboration mixtape with Ø Way affiliate Tezzus. The project has guest appearances from rappers Young Thug, Sk8star, Pz', Southsidesillhoutte, and Lil Righteous.

On August 17, 2026, a separately packaged deluxe edition of the project, titled Bling Bøi EP 2: Høsted by DJ Høliday, was released; it also serves as a sequel to his August 2025 project Bling Slime EP. The deluxe featured seven new tracks and a guest appearance from rapper Pz', with new appearances from rappers Pradabagshawty, Southsidesillhouette, and EA TJ.

== Background and release ==
This is our life, something gotta be wrong with you to live this music shit, you gotta be psyched out.

— Diamond* on making music.

In April 2026, following his signing to YSL Records, Diamond* would team up with label mate Tezzus to publish their first major mixtape together, titled UY Scuti Bøyz. Upon release, it received lukewarm to positive reviews from music critics. Following the mixtape's release, Diamond* continued to garner and build up more hype towards his name, which eventually led to him performing at Rolling Loud, in Orlando on May 8, and at Summer Smash 2026 in Chicago.

Shortly after his release and appearances, Diamond* would keep quiet about future major releases, until on July 7, 2026, a day before the project's release, when announced the official cover art and track list for the project. He announced that the project would have 11 tracks, with features from rappers Young Thug, Sk8star, Pz', Southsidesillhouette, and Lil Righteous. Following the reveals, Diamond* officially released the mixtape on July 8. A release party for the mixtape was hosted shortly after, where Young Thug performed live. Subsequently, it was announced that Diamond* would be performing with Thug and YSL on the YSL New Generation Tour.

On August 17, 2026, Diamond* would release the deluxe edition of the mixtape, titled Bling Bøi EP 2: Høsted by DJ Holiday. It also serves as a sequel to his August 2025 project Bling Boi EP and features seven new tracks with four features from rappers Pradabagshawty, EA TJ, and Southsidesillhouette; additionally, rapper Pz' reappeared as a feature.

== Composition ==
=== Overview ===
Bling Slime Vøl 1: Høsted by DJ Holiday is a hip-hop album that blends trap and rage throughout. It has 11 tracks with features from rappers Young Thug, Pz' Sk8star, Lil Righteous, and Southsidesillhouette, and is hosted by DJ Holiday. According to Alexander Cole of HotNewHipHop, the project features "challenging production and vocals" which is heavily inspired by Diamond*'s mentor Thug. According to Olivier Lafontant of Pitchfork, the project sees Diamond* delve away from the melodic side of music and features more "hard-nosed rapping". Lyrically, the project sees Diamond* rap about having sex with many women and brag about his lavish lifestyle.

=== Songs ===
According to Olivier Lafontant of Pitchfork, the track "Wyd2" features "deathly precise" punch-ins line after line without losing his pace. "Fours" sees Diamond* reunite with Thug, where on the track, he sounds "aggressive and determined", but it is not fully effortless as Diamond*'s timing feels slightly off-center. According to Drew Neiman of The Fader, the track "Hedis N Pelles" with Pz' features "ringing alarming synthesizers"; Neiman also called the track a "hard-hitting, bass blowing trap classic". Lafontant called it one of the most "guttural tracks" throughout the mixtape, writing about how the beat is carried with its "buzzsaw bassline". Jon Caramanica of The New York Times labeled the track as one of the sounds of modern-day Atlanta rage rap and the sounds of modern fashion trends. The track "GG" was labeled by Lafontant as one of the mixtape's high points; he wrote about how Diamond*'s fast-paced lyricism exactly meets the criteria of the track.

Lafontant praised the instrumentals on "Hørsebit" with Lil Righteous and "3 Wishes" with Sk8star, saying how the "starry keys" and "sappy atmosphere" of the tracks are reminiscent of that of a "Couple's Night at a roller rink". On "STFU", Diamond* raps on a "wavy" flow until he is "thrown off by a girl" and sounds slightly annoyed. "Burgers n Fries" with Southsidesillhouette features a sample from Smokey Robinson.

== Critical reception ==
Professional ratings
Review scores
Source	Rating
Pitchfork	7.5/10

Bling Slime Vøl 1: Høsted by DJ Holiday received positive reviews from music critics. Olivier Lafontant of Pitchfork rated the project 7.5 out of 10, praising Diamond*'s technical rapping, charismatic delivery, and ability to stand out in Atlanta's rap scene. The track "Hedis N Pelles" was featured in The Fader's "Songs You Need In Your Life This Week" playlist; Drew Neiman of the publication wrote about how the duo of Diamond* and Pz' turned "a relatively simple beat into a hard-hitting, bass-blowing trap classic". Antonio Johri of Complex labeled the mixtape as Diamond*'s standout release.

== Track listing ==
Credits adapted from Apple Music.

Bling Slime Vol 1: Høsted by DJ Høliday track listing
No.	Title	Writer(s)	Producer(s)	Length
1.	"Man on the Moon"	Minsonn Scott; Nate Varter	Varter	1:51
2.	"Almighty Dolla"	Scott; 90Lumiere	90Lumiere	2:54
3.	"WYD2"	Scott; Thr6x; Azzan Porter	Thr6x; Zaan	1:50
4.	"Fours" (featuring Young Thug)	Scott; Jeffery Williams; Anthony Fontonette	Brav06	2:51
5.	"Hedis n Pelles" (featuring Pz')	Scott; Payasu Njie; Lucius Lowe; Murphy McCleery; Christopher Quillin	Luc1us; Kat Lightning; Bhristo	2:49
6.	"GG"	Scott; Tyekoo	Tyekoo	1:53
7.	"Horsebit" (featuring Lil Righteous)	Scott; Brian Zanders; Phillipe Goudiaby; Joshua Kay	Phil; Funkay	2:08
8.	"3 Wishes" (featuring Sk8star)	Scott; J'Corey King; Goudiaby; Ty Hudson	Godfoggy; Phil	2:06
9.	"STFU"	Scott; Tyekoo	Tyekoo	1:51
10.	"Burgers n Fries" (featuring Southsidesillhouette)	Scott; Elijah Davis; Nasibulin Dritriy Rinatovich; Christian Jones	Southboy; TTM Kid	3:07
11.	"Matter of Time"	Scott; Brian Morgan	Zaydntdoit	2:27
Total length:				27:12

Bling Bøi EP 2: Høsted by DJ Høliday bonus tracks
No.	Title	Writer(s)	Producer(s)	Length
1.	"All Stars" (featuring Pz' and Southsidesillhouette)	Scott; Njie; Elijah; Robert Avery	TTM Kid; Sslitee; Asocial	2:47
2.	"Ferrari"	Scott; Cyrus Gomez; Tyson	WhyCeg; Pre4o	1:49
3.	"Splurge" (featuring EA TJ)	Scott; Tommy Smith; Elijah Armour; Tunjii; Dexstarr	Goxan; Tunjii; Dexstarr	2:16
4.	"Tattoos All Summer" (featuring Pradabagshawty)	Scott; Gomez; Dezeioun Crudup; London Woods	WhyCeg; Dezeiioun	2:08
5.	"Fucked Up"	Scott; Rodrigo Barahona; Mohkom Bhangal	Barahona; Money Musik	1:28
6.	"Sickö"	Scott; Lucius Lowe; Gian Baba; Dxrftgod	Luc1us; XGianni; Drxftgod	2:00
7.	"Montreality Freestyle"	Scott; Zachary Whitman	Meltycanon	2:05
Total length:				65:23

=== Notes ===
- All tracks are stylized in all caps.

=== Sample credits ===
- "Burgers n Fries" features a sample from "Much Better Off" by Smokey Robinson.

== Personnel ==
Credits adapted from Apple Music.

- Michael Updike – mastering
- Philip Goudiaby – mastering
- Often Forgotten – mastering (Note: Often Forgotten is uncredited for their mastering production on the introduction track.)
