= No Turning Back (mixtape) =

- Standard cover art

Mixtape by Pz'
- Released: June 21, 2026
- Genres: Rage; trap
- Length: 21:52
- Label: Banjul Music Group
- Producers: Ambezza; Bhristo; Kane 13; Kavi; Luc1us; M-EZ Beats; Ramzoid; Rok (Note: Also known as Rokonthetrack.); Sohi; Stickle; Twisco; Xami; XGiannii

Pz' chronology
B4NTB (2026)	No Turning Back (2026)

No Turning Back is the debut mixtape by American rapper and model Pz'. Released on June 21, 2026, through Banjul Music Records, the mixtape has nine tracks with a sole feature from rapper Dragnutz. The mixtape was preceded by the extended play (EP) B4NTB, which Pz' referred to as a "snack pack" before the release of the mixtape.

No Turning Back takes inspiration from the 2010s era of Atlanta hip-hop scene and blends trap music with pop-rap, cloud rap, and rage. Upon release, the mixtape generated positive reviews from media outlets such as The Fader, Pitchfork, and HotNewHipHop praising Pz's production choices and flows across the mixtape, as well as how polished the mixtape felt.

== Background ==
Pz' began recording music in 2023 after he moved in with Ø Way affiliate Tezzus; he cited artists such as Nettspend and Xaviersobased as driving forces to his will to push out further music to the public. After he moved in, Pz' began releasing a steady amount of music to streaming platforms. However, it was not until 2025 that he made a breakthrough within the underground rap scene with the release of his single "Hedi's Bussin'". He continued the momentum entering 2026 with the release of his track "Havana", which was critically acclaimed from artists such as Kuru and media outlets such as The Fader, who both credited the song as "the song of the summer (2026)". On April 17, 2026, he made an appearance on Tezzus & Diamond*'s collaborative mixtape, UY Scuti Bøyz, on the track "Head Øver Heels" with Diamond*.

The mixtape was first announced by Pz' via X, where he announced that a new mixtape was in the works; then in May, Pz' confirmed via an Instagram Live that the mixtape would see an official release in the summer. Then, in June, Pz' announced via X again that an extended play (EP) would be released in support of the mixtape, which Pz' referred to as a "snack pack" on his X account. The EP was released on June 19, 2026, and two days later, Pz' officially released the mixtape on all streaming platforms.

== Release and promotion ==
No Turning Back was officially released on June 21, 2026. On July 10, 2026, it was announced that Pz' would be a supporting act for Yeat's Love/Lyfe Tour in support of his sixth studio album ADL, where, on the tour, he would perform material off of No Turning Back. On October 3, 2026, Pz' made an appearance on ApolloRed1's set at ComplexCon 2026, where he performed unreleased material with the rapper as well as perform the track "X Tape" live for fans.

== Composition ==
=== Overview ===
Expanding on the style of its preceding EP, No Turning Back incorporates elements of rage, plugg, and melodic trap music. The mixtape is shaped by its "glitchy" 808 production, melodic arrangements, and elements of Afrobeat and amapiano across certain tracks. Vocally, Pz' takes a more melodic approach which contrasts his contemporaries within the music scene. Across the mixtape, Pz' frequently touches on designer brands, wealth, and his newfound fame, citing his relationships with family and friends as the source of that fame.

=== Songs ===
The mixtape opens up with "Never Gon Home", which sees Pz' reflect on his rise in the scene while being amidst the heat of it all, rapping "I just stay down ten toes down / You gon' watch this shit grow." "Live Strong" features a "glitchy strut" which resembles that of Jump Out by OsamaSon or Nø Idøls by Diamond*. "No Ceilings" sees Pz' collaborate with rapper Dragnutz, which is then followed into "X Tape", which was both produced by Luc1us. Dylan Green of Pitchfork wrote how both tracks are "filled with racks of Saint Laurent and the smell of Byredo." "Fête Feeling" features production from Stickle and Ambezza, where they bring in "rocky and robust" drums as well as "offer up a beat that’s equal parts footwork, amapiano, and Afrobeats fitted with Zaytoven-like keys." The track sees Pz' embrace his West African heritage while blending in Atlanta hip-hop. Lyrically, the track sees Pz' rap about "talking to girls on Skype" and blending different designer products.

== Critical reception ==
Professional ratings
Review scores
Source	Rating
Pitchfork	7.6/10

Upon release, No Turning Back received critical acclaim from media critics and fans. Alexander Cole of HotNewHipHop praised how polished the mixtape was and how it pushes Pz' further in the music scene. Dylan Green of Pitchfork rated the mixtape a 7.6 out of 10; like Cole, Green praised how polished the project was, writing how Pz' has the musical talent, confidence, and ambition to succeed in rap, and how fashion background contributes to his image, but his music is what makes him a promising artist. The mixtape was featured on The Fader's July 4th playlist, with Vivian Medithi, like the rest, praising the polished effort of the project, due to its mesmerizing hooks and laid-back melodic flows. Caleb Caitlin of Vice ranked "Fête Feeling" as one of the 10 best hip-hop and R&B songs of 2026, with Caitlin comparing Pz' to his mentor Young Thug. On Complex's "best albums of 2026 so far" ranking, No Turning Back was labeled as the best project of June, with Dimas Sanfiorenzo writing how the project doesn't disappoint for his fans and the people who co-signed the rapper. According to Guillermo Andrade of Wonderland, he wrote how No Turning Back cemented Pz' at "US's rap high table", calling it a mature and cinematic project by the rapper.

== Track listing ==
No Turning Back track listing
No.	Title	Writer(s)	Producer(s)	Length
1.	"Never Gon Home"	Papayusupha Goree Njie; Lucius Lowe; Julien Lopes; Jarrod Morgan	Luc1us; Ramzoid; Twisco	2:00
2.	"Live Strong"	Njie; Rok Curkovic	Rok	2:08
3.	"Dis Ain't Right"	Njie; Lowe; Christopher Quillin; Kavian Salehi	Luc1us; Bhristo; Kavi	2:30
4.	"Cannes"	Njie; Andreas Janetschko	Stickle	2:08
5.	"No Ceilings" (featuring Dragnutz)	Njie; Tijan Ebrima; Lowe	Luc1us	2:55
6.	"X Tape"	Njie; Daniel Greene; Lowe	Luc1us; Sohi	2:27
7.	"Fête Feeling"	Njie; Janetschko; Mathias Daniel Liyew; Okan Toktamis; Tony Brown	Stickle; Ambezza; Kane 13; M-Ez Beats	2:31
8.	"Claim To Fame"	Njie; Lopes	Ramzoid	2:11
9.	"Maxfields"	Njie; Lowe; Gian Baba; Xami	Luc1us; XGiannii; Xami	2:25

=== Notes ===
- "This" is spelled as "Dis" on track 3.

== Personnel ==
Credits adapted from Apple Music and Tidal.

- Papayusupha Goree Njie - vocals
- Tijan Ebrima - vocals (5)
- Lucius Lowe - mixing engineer (1, 3, 5, 6, 8, 9)
- Jackson Walters-Lowe - mixing engineer (5)
- Fvxk808 - mixing engineer (5)
