= Designer Junkie =

Studio album by Sk8star
- Released: February 11, 2026
- Recorded: 2024–2026
- Genres: Rage; trap
- Length: 47:02
- Labels: W4th; Island
- Producers: 44preme; Cade; Cashheart; Ediba Deville; Fourteen; Lobeats; Mack Got The Heat; Nosaint; Oh Ross; Richie Souf; Rosen Beatz; Safari; Taurus; Jvsper

Sk8star chronology
Pale Fever (2025)	Designer Junkie (2026)	The Beautiful Rebellion (2026)

Singles from Designer Junkie
- 1. "2 Sexy" Released: December 10, 2025; 2. "ForMyFolks" Released: January 21, 2026

Designer Junkie is the debut studio album by American rapper Sk8star. It was released through W4th Records and Island Records on February 11, 2026. The album was executively produced by Richie Souf, and features other production credits from 44preme, Cade, Nosaint, and Taurus, among others. It features guest appearances from his Ø Way partners and YSL artists Tezzus and Diamond*. Designer Junkie was preceded by the lead singles "2 Sexy" and "ForMyFolks".

Designer Junkie was in the making for two years and underwent five different revisions before being officially released. Upon release, the album was positively received, with media critics such as The Fader and Pitchfork praising Sk8star's experimentation, distinct vocals, and his chemistry with Richie Souf throughout the project.

== Background and recording ==
"The funniest session was the songs I have with Tezzus and Diamond*, 'NSD' and 'Yeaan'. [...] But the craziest session is definitely 'Designer Junkie'"

— Sk8star on the recording sessions with Tezzus and Diamond*.

Sk8star began working on Designer Junkie as early as 2024 and continued working on it for over two years. According to Sk8star, it went through five different revisions during its development, with Sk8star altering its direction and composition several times. During the album's development, Sk8star directly reached out to music producer Richie Souf, asking the producer if the two could collaborate. After initially receiving no response, Souf later contacted Sk8star in 2025 and sent him beats to rap to. Over time, the two began communicating frequently and working closely throughout the project's creation. Souf later became the lead architect of the project's sound and would guide Sk8star toward new creative decisions, which ultimately became one of the major factors for the album's development.

Several recording sessions for the album included fellow Ø Way affiliates Tezzus and Diamond*, for "NSD" and "Yeannn". Tezzus participated despite suffering from exhaustion after a month-long tour schedule, while Diamond* was ill from influenza. According to Sk8star, Tezzus recorded his contribution before immediately returning to sleep, a moment he described as emblematic of the dedication shown by his collaborators. "NSD" was made after "Yeannn"; according to Tezzus, it was a "legendary" recording session where they "came, handled business, and left".

The title track, "Designer Junkie", was recorded following a trip to a jewelry store where he and fellow American rapper and Ø Way affiliate Diorvsyou spent thousands of dollars on jewelery. Sk8star described the session as a symbolic milestone in his career, reflecting on his financial struggles before achieving recognition.

The album was preceded by two lead singles, titled "2 Sexy", which was released on December 10, 2025, and "ForMyFolks", which was released on January 21, 2026. The album was released on February 11, 2026.

== Composition ==
=== Overview ===
Designer Junkie is a rage and trap album. Featuring twenty tracks and two features from Tezzus and Diamond*, the album's sound expands on the Atlanta hip-hop scene while seeing Sk8star use his "unique voice" and "experimentation" across music production from Richie Souf, 44preme, Cade, Cashheart, Ediba Deville, Fourteen, Lobeats, Mack Got The Heat, Nosaint, Oh Ross, Rosen Beatz, Safari, Taurus, and Jvsper. Vivian Medithi of The Fader labeled Designer Junkie as a "psychedelic-trap" project and saw him channel sounds similar to Lil Keed, Lil Gotit, and Future.

=== Music and lyrics ===
The album starts with "Incognito"; the track features drum production from Richie Souf, and lyrically sees Sk8star rap about taking losses and playing his part within his community and life. It follows with lows with "Brazy Brazy Ho"; on the track, Sk8star goes through numerous different flows with a voice that Serge Selenou of Pitchfork found reminiscent of Beast Mode-era Future. On the track, Sk8star accentuates his syllables with a raspy voice. Selenou labeled the track as a gritty Atlanta trap-style song. Selenou described "ForMyFolks" as seeing Sk8star rap as if he has Hubba Bubba gum in his mouth. On "Muse", Sk8star slightly expands on the regalia subgenre, where he raps about trying to make a "bad bitch" his source of inspiration. Antonio Johri of Complex thought Sk8star sounded "robotic," and that his voice was similar to Mr. Krabs. On the title track, "Designer Junkie", Sk8star approaches a track filled with synthesizers and hi-hats in courtesy of Cashheart. He reflects on his journey from being poor to making ample amounts of money and being able to support himself and others, marking it a milestone in his career.

On "No Compadre", Sk8star approaches a rage instrumental to rap about how everything he does is the greatest. "Yeannn" with Tezzus sees the duo turn a "little piece of onomatopoeia" into the "centerpiece of a hit", according to Olivier Lafontant of Pitchfork. The track sees the duo deploy "yawns that stretch like a bungee over Zaytoven-type keys", with Sk8star rapping about money. In contrast, Tezzus raps about sex and money; he takes the majority of the track with his coarse, creaking melodies. Lafontant thought the track was "funny as hell" and "haphazardly genius". "Beret" explores hyper trap, and on "BleedLike Me", Sk8star takes a cloud rap direction and raps about how he puts in more "blood, sweat, and tears" into his work compared to others in the scene. Additionally, Sk8star has "long-winded croons" which Selenou found to be reminiscent of Lil Keed. Sk8star also "hustle raps" throughout the track, which is similar to that of Lil Baby. On "PlayYaPart", Sk8star raps over a psychedelic trap instrumental from Cade, reflecting on dropping out of school to make money from music. "2 Sexy" interpolates the Right Said Fred track "I'm Too Sexy". Vivian Medithi of The Fader praised the track, writing how Sk8star's pinched melodies seem to coexist and work very well on the "shimmering" Nosaint instrumental. Lyrically, Sk8star raps about living a hedonistic life. According to Medithi, Sk8star's airy lyricism makes simple lyrics sound catchy.

"Slatt Slatt" sees Sk8star rap about being fresh over a synth-driven instrumental. On "NSD" (Niggas Start Dyin'), Sk8star reunites with Tezzus. It also brings in Diamond*, and the track sees the trio rap about telling their haters to worry about themselves rather than worrying about the rappers' luxurious lifestyles. "Macon" is an ode to Sk8star's hometown. The track sees Sk8star go back to rapping on a trap instrumental, something he does throughout the album. Lyrically, he raps about making it out of the titular city due to his rise in the music industry and being able to financially support himself. On "Upper Echelon", Sk8star raps on a trap beat from Taurus while talking about reaching higher levels of quality within the past three and a half years. The track features twinkling piano keys, which amplifies Sk8star's vocals. On "Roxy Paparrazi", Sk8star explores pluggnb and admires his girlfriend's beauty. Selenou thought that Sk8star's repeated "doe-eyed" refrain of "I'm tryna make her mine" makes the track feel genuine and pure due to the "fairytale-like whistles beneath it". "All In" blends cloud rap, trap, and pop rap with lyrics about hedonistic lifestyles, such as telling a stripper to twerk on a pole. "Black Sheep" continues to pull inspiration from the regalia subgenre and sees Sk8star discuss his own personal experiences of feeling like an outcast. "RipScooter" sees Sk8star pay homage to Young Scooter while "leaning into the futuristic swag era revival of the last year [2025]". The track features rapid fire hi-hats and helps serve as a runway for Sk8star's "octane and flexy quips". The closing track, "Nameless", sees Sk8star "cloudily" rap about not wanting to change anything if he ever had the chance to rewind time, ending the album on a more sentimental note.

== Critical reception ==
Professional ratings
Review scores
Source	Rating
Pitchfork	7.2/10
Legends Will Never Die	4/5

Reviews for Designer Junkie were mostly positive. Serge Selenou of Pitchfork rated the album a 7.2 out of 10. He wrote about how experimental the project is, and how it just does not see Sk8star mimic his predecessors from the Atlanta hip-hop scene, the album manages to find a unique voice that outruns its origins. A reviewer from Legends Will Never Die wrote how the project is well refined and showcases Sk8star's growth over the years. The reviewer also highlighted Sk8star's chemistry with producer Richie Souf. "2 Sexy" was ranked as one of the best songs of 2025 by The Fader, while "Slatt Slatt" was included on Pitchfork's Weekly Select Playlist.

== Track listing ==
Track listing adapted from Tidal.

Designer Junkie track listing
No.	Title	Writer(s)	Producer(s)	Length
1.	"Incognito"	J'Corey King; Tony Son	Richie Souf	3:01
2.	"Brazy Brazy Ho"	King; Son; Anthony Huitron	CashHeart	2:05
3.	"ForMyFolks"	King; Elijah Zaire Smith	NoSaint	2:19
4.	"Muse"	King; Son; Huitron	CashHeart; Richie Souf	2:35
5.	"Designer Junkie"	King; Son; Huitron	CashHeart; Richie Souf	3:09
6.	"No Compadre"	King; Son; Huitron	CashHeart; Richie Souf	2:04
7.	"Yeannn" (featuring Tezzus)	T'Corrian Walton; King; Fourteen Hongmahasak	Fourteen; Richie Souf	1:52
8.	"Beret"	King; Smith	NoSaint	1:24
9.	"BleedLike Me"	King; Son; Huitron	Richie Souf; CashHeart	2:11
10.	"PlayYaPart"	King; Cade Phillip Blodgett; Martin Samoska; Shane Jessen	Cade; Safari; OhRoss; LoBeats	2:24
11.	"2 Sexy"	King; Smith	NoSaint	2:19
12.	"Slatt Slatt"	King; Son; Huitron	CashHeart; Richie Souf	2:41
13.	"NSD" (featuring Tezzus and Diamond*)	Misonn Scott; King; Walton; Smith	NoSaint	2:03
14.	"Macon"	King; Smith; Hongmahasak	NoSaint; Son; Fourteen	2:07
15.	"Upper Echelon"	King; Jason Rosenberg; Taurus Bucy Currie; Jasper Van Hoof	Taurus; Rosen Beatz; Jvsper	3:08
16.	"Roxy Paparazzi"	King; Son; Huitron	Richie Souf; CashHeart	3:00
17.	"All In"	King; Ediba Deville; Aaron Mackins; Arick Mackins	44preme; Ediba Deville; Mack Got The Heat	2:04
18.	"Black Sheep"	King; Son; Huitron	Richie Souf; CashHeart	2:23
19.	"RipScooter"	King; Son; Huitron	Richie Souf; CashHeart	1:48
20.	"Nameless"	King; Son; Hongmahasak	Richie Souf; Fourteen	2:18
Total length:				47:02

=== Notes ===
- "2 Sexy" interpolates Right Said Fred's track "I'm Too Sexy".
- "ForMyFolks" and "RipScooter" feature no spaces in the track title name.
- The track "NSD" is an acronym for "Niggas Start Dyin'".

=== Additional credits ===
- Philippe Goudiaby – mixing, engineering, and mastering.

== See also ==
- 2026 in hip-hop
