= Sk8star =

American rapper (born 2004)

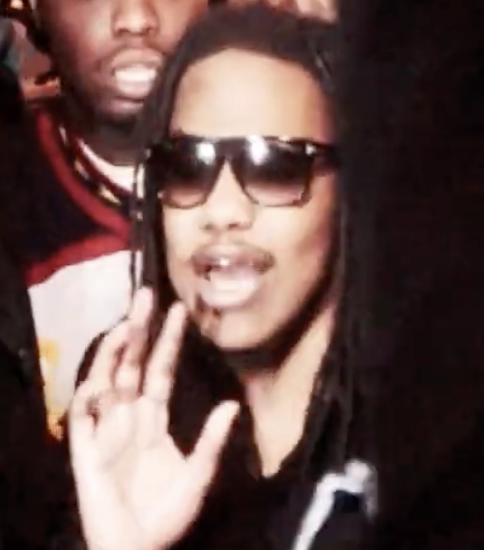
- Sk8star in 2026

Background information
- Born: J'Corey King; March 29, 2004 (age 22); Macon, Georgia, U.S. (Note: While some sources say that King is from Birmingham, England, King himself stated in an interview that he isn't from the United Kingdom, and that he's been living in Georgia for his entire life.)
- Origin: Atlanta, Georgia, U.S.
- Genres: Hip-hop; trap; rage
- Occupations: Rapper; songwriter
- Instrument: Vocals
- Years active: 2020–present
- Labels: W4th Records; Island Records
- Member of: Ø Way

J'Corey King (born March 29, 2004), known professionally as Sk8star, is an American rapper from Macon, Georgia. Known for his contributions in the Atlanta hip-hop scene, his project, Designer Junkie was critically acclaimed by media outlets such as Pitchfork and The Fader. King is also known for being affiliated with Young Thug's YSL group and is also a member of the Atlanta-based collective, Ø Way.

== Early life ==
J'Corey King was born in Macon, Georgia and spent half of his life there before relocating to Atlanta. He labeled himself as a black sheep within his community. King began recording early at the age of nine, when he did a remix over A$AP Rocky's 2011 track "Peso"; his older cousin, Juwon, recorded the verse. However, he began taking music seriously in tenth grade, using Mixcraft with a $30 snowball mic.

== Career ==
=== 2021-2025: Beginnings and early releases ===
After taking music seriously in tenth grade, King released his first track, titled "Stand 4 Sum," on streaming platforms. His first major release was titled Superstar Status. Following his career start, King would release a prolific amount of music onto streaming platforms. His second project, titled New World Order, was released in 2022, which was later followed with Mogul. King then followed with Rebel and Whole New Meaning in 2023. Rebel in the Room appeared in 2024, and his EP, REBELUTION was issued in 2025.

=== 2025-present: Rise to fame, Designer Junkie release ===
In July of the same year, he released his last project of the year titled PALE FEVER. On December 10, 2025, serving as his last release of the year, King released "2 Sexy", which served as one of the two lead singles to King's upcoming album, titled Designer Junkie. Entering 2026, King would release "ForMyFolks," serving as the last release before his album. Then, on February 11, 2026, King would go on to release Designer Junkie. The album would have 20 tracks with features from Tezzus and Diamond*. Upon release, it was critically acclaimed for its music production, experimentation and lyricism from King. Serge Selenou of Pitchfork gave the album a 7.2/10, commenting that King "tightens his wild experimentation on an album that spotlights his increasingly distinct voice". On April 8, 2026, he released Quagoo. Eight days after the release, King was featured on Tezzus and Diamond's mixtape, UY Scuti Bøyz, specifically on the track "JØTP", alongside EA TJ, and Lil Righteous. On June 22, 2026, it was announced that King would be supporting rapper Lucki on his Bad Influence Tour. On July 8, 2026, King was featured on the eighth track "3 Wishes" on Bling Slime Vøl 1: Høsted by DJ Holiday by Diamond*. On August 12, 2026, Sk8star released his EP The Beautiful Rebellion. On August 28, 2026, King was featured on Young Thug's YSL Slime Language 3 project.

== Musical style, artistry, and influences ==
King's musical style is experimental and reminiscent of Playboi Carti and Young Thug. His style incorporates choppy and ad-lib heavy flows paired with AutoTuned vocals. His vocal flows throughout his project, Designer Junkie received comparisons to Lil Gotit from music reviewers.

In his interview with Hypebeast, King stated that the whole Atlanta hip-hop scene influenced his music, with artists such as Young Thug, Lil Wayne, Future, T.I., Rich Kidz, and early YSL offsprings such as Lil Keed and Lil Gotit also played a role in shaping King's current sound. Outside of artists, he also stated that his love for movies is also a source of inspiration for him.

== Reception ==
King's music has been positively received amongst the underground hip-hop scene, which helped get him generate a co-sign from Atlanta rapper Young Thug. His track, "2 Sexy", was labeled as one of the best songs of 2025 by The Fader. Additionally, his track "Slatt Slatt" was listed on the "Pitchfork Selects" playlist during the week of February 17, 2026. Additionally, King was listed as one of the 32 coolest artists of 2026 by The Fader.
