= UY Scuti Bøyz =

2026 collaborative mixtape by Tezzus and Diamond*

UY Scuti Boyz
- Official cover art

Mixtape by Tezzus and Diamond*
- Released: April 17, 2026
- Recorded: 2025–2026
- Genres: Hip-hop, underground rap
- Length: 47:39
- Label: Young Stoner Life
- Producers: 44preme; ADHD; Akachi; Deyflo; Dez Wright; DP Beats; Evan Moitoso; Fielry; Ghostrage; gloryisgone2; Goxan; HariRoc; Juko (Producer); Kaizzr; Kassgocrazy; Kat Lightning; Krager; London on da Track; Luc1us; Mack Got the Heat; Madmaax; Nolooove; Ojivolta; Project4Play; Richie Souf; skaiwater; Slayer; tjriverss; Traiqo; Truckee Street; TTM Kid; Usagi; WhyCeg; Wonderyo; xgiannii; Yakree

Tezzus chronology
Tezzy Pendergrass (2025)	UY Scuti Boyz (2026)	The Ressurectiøn (2026)

Diamond* chronology
Nø Idøls (2025)	UY Scuti Boyz (2026)	Bling Slime Vøl 1: Høsted by DJ Holiday (2026)

Singles from UY Scuti Boyz
- 1. "Duality" Released: March 20, 2026

UY Scuti Boyz (stylized as UY Scuti Bøyz in all caps) is a collaborative mixtape by the American rappers Tezzus and Diamond* of the hip-hop group Ø Way. It was released on April 17, 2026, under Young Stoner Life Records. The album features Young Thug, Rylo Rodriguez, Skaiwater, Nino Paid, Yung Fazo, Sk8star, Pz' and more. The lead single for the album, "Duality", was released on March 20, 2026. The mixtape is named after Thug's 2025 album UY Scuti.

== Background ==
The lead single "Duality" was released on March 20, 2026, the song was recorded live on a livestream with the American rapper and content creator PlaqueBoyMax.

== Composition ==
=== Overview ===
Tallie Spencer of HotNewHipHop stated that the project sees the duo step into a bigger spotlight, highlighting how the project leans more towards "dark, atmospheric production and a new wave of underground rap energy." Spencer also writes how the mixtape is rooted in the new wave of internet-era sound, since the project features "moody beats, distorted textures, and a mix of melodic and aggressive delivery". The purpose of the project is to be raw. Spencer later ends the review by saying how the feature list helps expand the reach of a newer and deeper audience.

Stereo Williams of Okayplayer felt the same way as Spencer; he wrote how the project embraces "sinister, moody production and a new surge of underground rap energy." While feeling very throwback to sounds like "dark beats, murky textures and a mix of melodic and aggressive delivery." Oba Awolowo of Pitchfork wrote how the project is "full of high-energy link-ups and an eclectic beat palette."But he also wrote how the 18-track project is a little too much and makes the project feel overstuffed.

=== Songs ===
Alphonse Pierre of Pitchfork wrote that "Trashcan" is the "filthiest" song on Uy Scuti Bøyz. Pierre also writes how the "wobbly" "Jøtp" sees Tezzus get into his Barter 6 bag while Diamond* "floats like a Drip Season 3 Gunna over the ragey plugg of “Chill Øut.” On "Duality", as the track's name suggests, Tezzus brings his rowdiness while Diamond* brings his realism. Alexander Cole of HotNewHipHop wrote how the name fits the song very well, writing how the first half, by Diamond*, is more subdued, while the second half, by Tezzus, is more chaotic and wild. Overall, he praises the track by saying how "it is a cool track and one that will get new fans hooked." On "Baby," Antonio Johri of Complex wrote how Yung Fazo brings a "mainstream-ready melodic edge" to the track.

Oba Awolowo of Pitchfork felt the same as Pierre, with him writing how "Duality" sees Diamond* "skate through" the first half with his AutoTuned vocals while Tezzus roars through the second with coarse vocals and foul-mouthed bars. Awolowo also wrote how tracks "Ew" and "Step Child" feature production where the "lightning-fast" hi-hats and punchy snares rattle atop "Zaytoven-flared piano stabs", cushioning MIDI synth-strings and sirens. Awolowo compares the sound to that of Thug's So Much Fun era. "Ice Øn" sees Tezzus and Diamond* showcase their sensual sides while "Løve Løst" and "I'm An Artist" capture ingenuity.

== Critical reception ==
Professional ratings
Review scores
Source	Rating
Pitchfork	6.4/10

Pitchfork highlighted the duo's chemistry and the diversity of the project's sound and feature list. Oba Awolowo of Pitchfork rated the mixtape 6.4 out of 10, highlighting the chemistry between both artists, but also wrote how it is not used enough. Awolowo also praised the mixtape's music production, saying how energetic, chaotic, and diverse it is. Despite praising the project, he felt it had too many features and was overall more like a compilation tape than an actual project. Awolowo concludes the review, saying that while the project has its good moments, it lacks a real identity and feels incomplete. Additionally, Dimas Sanfiorenzo of Complex labeled UY Scuti Bøyz as one of the best rap albums of 2026 so far.

== Track listing ==
Credits adapted from Tidal.

No.	Title	Writer(s)	Producer(s)	Length
1.	"UY Scuti" (featuring Young Thug)	T'Corrian Walton; Misonn Scott; Jeffery Williams	London on da Track; Ojivolta	3:42
2.	"Ew" (featuring EA TJ)	Walton; Scott; Tommy Smith	Kassgocrazy	2:10
3.	"Trashcan"	Walton; Scott	Nolooove; Project4Play	2:01
4.	"Baby" (performed by Tezzus featuring Southsidesilhouette and Yung Fazo)	Walton; Elijah Davis; Fazan Munshi	HariRoc	3:15
5.	"Slime for Years" (featuring Biggs Money)	Walton; Scott; Quandravious Jewell	Luc1us; Tjriverss; Madmaax	1:56
6.	"Step Child" (featuring Hittman)	Walton; Scott; Robert Holliday	Yakree; Slayer	2:28
7.	"Guess What" (performed by Tezzus featuring Skaiwater)	Walton; Tyler Brooks	Skaiwater; Kat Lightning; Bankroll Got It; Truckee Street	2:51
8.	"Da Fuck" (performed by Tezzus featuring Young Thug and Rylo Rodriguez)	Walton; Williams; Ryan Adams	TTM Kid	2:32
9.	"Chill Out" (featuring ShawtyRokk)	Walton; Scott; ShawtyRokk	Goxan	2:26
10.	"Ice On"	Walton; Scott	Yakree; Akachi; DP Beats	2:27
11.	"Head Over Heels" (performed by Diamond* featuring Pz')	Scott; Payusu Njie	ADHD; Traiqo; WhyCeg	1:59
12.	"JOTP" (performed by Tezzus featuring EA TJ, Sk8star, and Lil Righteous)	Walton; Smith; Brian Zanders; J'Corey King	Richie Souf	2:30
13.	"Motherfuckers" (featuring Southsidesillhouette)	Walton; Scott; Davis	Mack Got the Heat; 44preme; Evan Moitoso	2:54
14.	"Saint Claire's" (featuring Nino Paid)	Walton; Scott; Tyree White	Mack Got the Heat; 44preme	2:10
15.	"Løve Løst"	Walton; Scott	Bankroll Got It; Truckee Street; Ghostrage	2:59
16.	"I'm an Artist"	Walton; Scott	Luc1us; Xgiannii; Usagi	3:40
17.	"Hell Yeah" (performed by Tezzus featuring BSlime)	Walton; Jaborious Martin	Jectbby	3:12
18.	"Duality"	Walton; Scott	Deyflo; Krager; Kaizzr; Gloryisgone2	2:19
Total length:				47:39

== See also ==
- 2026 in hip-hop
