= DJ Holiday =

American record producer (born 1983)

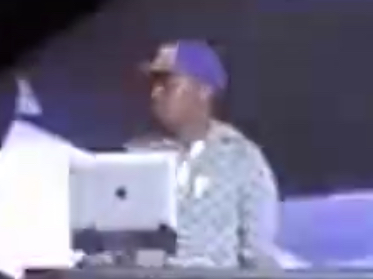
- DJ Holiday performing in 2019

Background information
- Born: Robert Avery; 1983 (age 42–43); Germany
- Origin: Decatur, Georgia, U.S.
- Genres: Hip hop
- Occupations: Record producer, disc jockey

Robert Avery (born 1983), known professionally as DJ Holiday is a German-born American hip hop record producer and disc jockey. He was a frequent collaborator with Gucci Mane in the late 2000s. He later worked with rappers such as Nicki Minaj, Wiz Khalifa, and Young Thug.

== Career ==
Avery was born in 1983 in Germany, but was raised in Decatur, Georgia.

In 2008, Avery produced for Gucci Mane for his mixtape EA Sportscenter. He wanted to produce another mixtape for Gucci Mane, calling it Writing on the Wall, which Gucci Mane described in his autobiography as "lame". The mixtape later released in 2009. Also in 2009, he produced Gucci Mane's "Brrrussia" for the mixtape The Cold War: Part 3.

In 2015, Chief Keef collaborated with Avery for his mixtape Finally Rollin 2. Also in 2015, he released his own mixtape God Bless, which had features from Rich Homie Quan, Migos and Future.

In March 2017, Avery produced "Wassup Wid It" for 2 Chainz. A music video was later released in June.

In 2018, Avery collaborated with Dave East as executive producer for the mixtape Karma 2. Soon after, he released the single "2 Seater" with 21 Savage and Quavo.

== Discography ==
- BLING SLIME VØL 1: HØSTED BY DJ HØLIDAY with diamond* (2026)
- It's just us with DTG Trizzy and Scootgang Herb (2024)
- Money Machines with Steve Glo and Sex Money Mitch (2023)
- Plug Motivation with BandedUp Kizzl (2021)
- Practice on the Weekends with FloKid (2020)
- Rari Talk: Verified with Ferrari Simmons (2020)
- Tales From the Road (2020)
- Better Than Good Enough (2019)
- Certified (2019)
- The M Tape with Muhleak (2019)
- Jugg Baby with Coca Vango (2018)
- Karma 2 with Dave East (2018)
- Karma with Dave East (2017)
- God Bless (2015)
- Finally Rollin 2 with Chief Keef (2015)
- Burrrprint (2) HD with Gucci Mane (2010)
- Writing on the Wall with Gucci Mane (2009)
- EA Sportscenter with Gucci Mane (2008)
