= Pz' =

American rapper and model

- Also known as: Papa Njie; P3ezy; YVL Prince
- Born: Papayusupha Goree Njie; January 3, 2003 (age 23); Atlanta, Georgia, US
- Genres: Hip-hop; trap; rage
- Occupations: Rapper; model
- Years active: 2023–present
- Member of: Ø Way

Papayusupha Goree Njie (born January 3, 2003), known professionally as Pz', is an American rapper and model from Atlanta, Georgia. He is known for his affiliation with the collectives Ø Way and YVL. In June 2026, he released his debut mixtape, No Turning Back, to which it received critical acclaim from several media outlets.

== Early life and modeling career ==
Papayusupha Goree Njie was born on January 3, 2003. He is from Atlanta, Georgia, and is of Gambian and Senegalese descent, which he got from his mother, and Kenyan and Moroccan descent, which he got from his father. After high school, he enrolled in Georgia State University and worked a part-time job at a high-end retail store in Buckhead. In 2020, Pz' moved to New York at the age of 17, where his sense of the Internet began to grow.

Pz' began his modeling career late 2022, where he would often be scouted before he signed with Wilhelmina Models in late 2023. In 2024, he made his debut at London Fashion Week 2024 after he was selected by Mowalola Ogunlesi. He later worked with Hedi Slimane. In June 2025, he made his runway appearance for Louis Vuitton at Paris Fashion Week hosted by Pharrell Williams. In September 2026, Pz' was a part of the rollout for the Denim Tears x Billionare Boys Club clothing line release.

== Music career ==
Pz''s music career began in 2023, after he moved in with American rapper and fellow Ø Way affiliate Tezzus. After moving in, he began releasing music but did not find success until 2025, following the release of his track "Hedi's Bussin'". He later gained more attention online following the release of the "Havana" on New Year's Day in 2026. On April 17, 2026, he was featured on Tezzus & Diamond*'s collaborative mixtape, UY Scuti Bøyz, where he was featured on the track "Head Øver Heels" with Diamond*. Two months later, on June 18, 2026, Pz' released B4NTB, which serves as a prelude to his debut extended play (EP), No Turning Back.

No Turning Back was released on June 20, 2026. The EP was positively received by Pitchfork, with Dylan Green writing about how polished and assured the project felt. On July 8, 2026, Pz' was featured on Diamond*'s surprise released mixtape, Bling Slime Vøl 1, where he appeared on the track "Hedis N Pelles". On July 10, 2026, it was announced that Pz' would be opening for Yeat during his Love/Lyfe tour in support of his sixth studio album, ADL. Pz' was featured on YSL Records's Slime Language 3 on August 28, 2026. On October 16, 2026, Pz' was featured on rapper Sixbill's album Pure Lust. On October 30,2026, Pz' was featured on the track "Lead Never Follow" off of Kill Your Idols by Bleood.

== Artistry and reception ==
=== Artistry ===
Pz''s flow has been described as ambient and laid-back, with Vivian Medithi of The Fader labeling his flows as delicate and intricate. Medithi also described how poised Pz' can be across "woozy instrumentals". Alphonse Pierre of Pitchfork labeled Pz' as sharing similar aspects to that of ASAP Rocky, both musically and in modeling. He labeled him as the "obvious heir of the model rap crown". Alexander Cole of HotNewHipHop wrote about how B4NTB featured flows similar to those of Young Thug.

=== Reception ===
Pz' has received cosigns from Playboi Carti, Hedi Slimane, Chxrry, Effa Fouda, and Kuru, who labeled his song "Havana" as the song of the summer, with Vivian Medithi of The Fader agreeing. Pz' is also affiliated with artists such as Nettspend and Xaviersobased and their collectives such as 1c34 and Surf Gang. As of October 2026, Pz' was listed as the 65th hottest rapper on Complex's top 100 list.

== Personal life ==
Pz's mother was formerly a fashion model.
