= 1300Saint =

American rapper (born 2004)

1300SAINT
- Born: DeAndre Jason McKee; April 24, 2004 (age 22); Atlanta, Georgia, U.S.
- Genres: Trap, melodic rap
- Occupation: Rapper
- Years active: 2021–present
- Label: YSL

DeAndre Jason McKee (born April 24, 2004), known professionally as 1300Saint (stylized in all caps), is an American rapper from Atlanta. He signed with Young Thug's Young Stoner Life Records in early 2024, and later guest appeared on Young Thug's fourth album, UY Scuti (2025), as well as the label's compilation album Slime Language 3 (2026).

== Early life ==
DeAndre Jason McKee was born on April 24, 2002, in Atlanta, Georgia. He later moved to Maryland. In his teenage years, McKee worked at Chipotle and Pacsun, working minimum wage while being an artist.

== Career ==
In an interview with Breativity. McKee began making music during the COVID-19 pandemic in 2020, with his earliest songs being released on SoundCloud in 2021. He took it more seriously around 2022. In early 2024, he signed with Young Stoner Life Records (YSL), a record label founded by Young Thug. His first studio album release under the label was All Hail. In April 2025, he released Saint Season, an EP paying homage to his honcho Thug's mixtape Slime Season 3. In May, he was featured on PlaqueBoyMax's EP, titled Atlanta, where he appeared on the track "Party" alongside ApolloRed1 and Tana. Four months after, he released his second EP of the year, titled NewDrug, which had features from ApolloRed1, Sk8Star, and Diorvsyou. In September, McKee was featured on Thug's project, UY Scuti, alongside Lil Gotit, on the song "Revenge". In November, McKee released Savior.

Entering 2026, McKee released the deluxe to his November project, titled Savior: ++, which had features from Sk8star, ApolloRed1, and Nine Vicious. On May 10, 2026, McKee made his debut at Rolling Loud in Orlando, Florida. On June 12, 2026, McKee performed at Summer Smash 2026. On July 11, 2026, it was announced that McKee, alongside the rest of the YSL affiliates would be embarking on the YSL New Generation Tour. On August 7, 2026, McKee released his second EP, NewDrug2. On August 28, 2026, McKee was featured on YSL Records' Slime Language 3.

== Musical style ==
McKee's known for his trap and melodic rap styles.
