= Nine Vicious =

American rapper (born 2002)

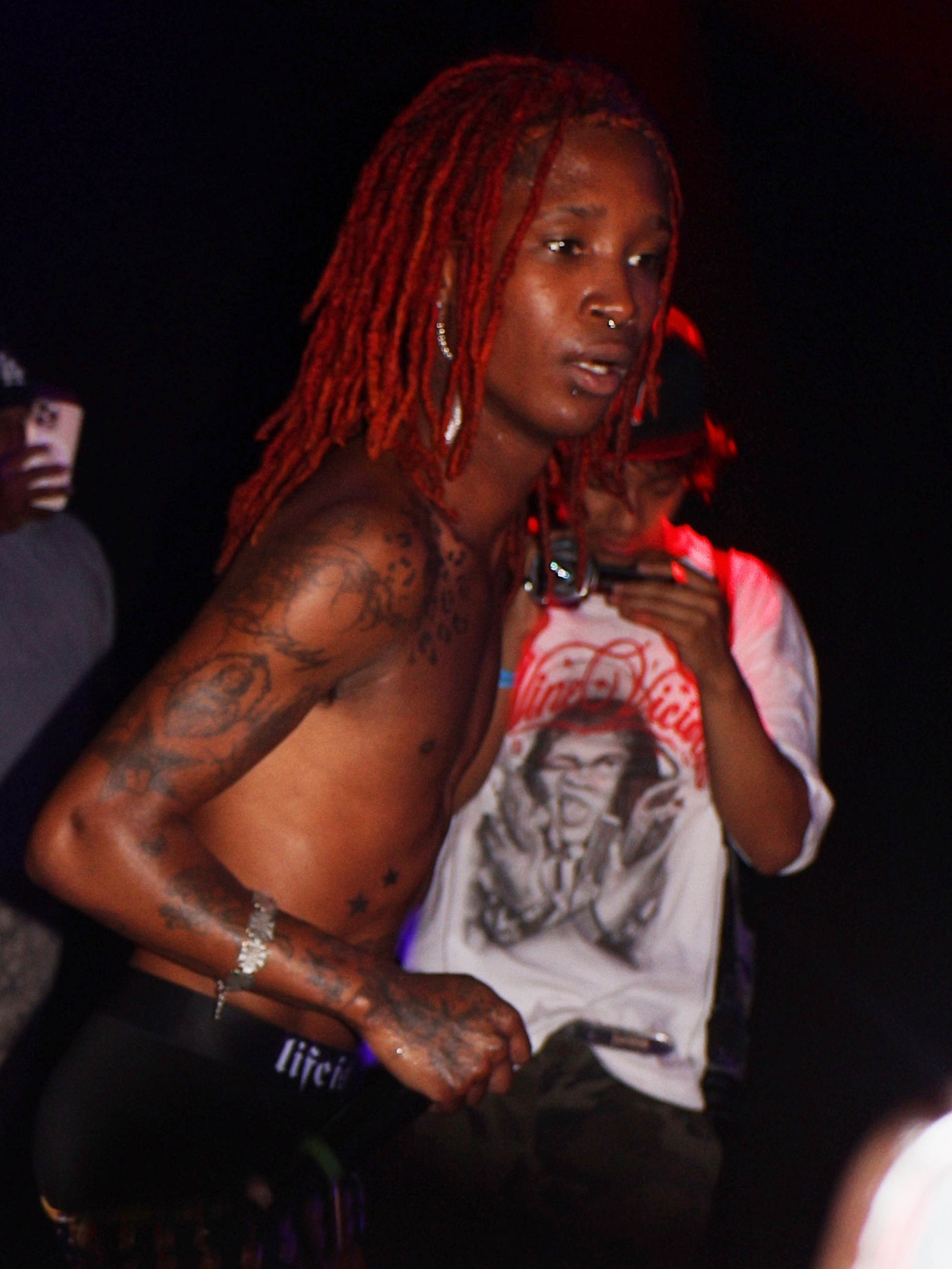
- Nine Vicious in 2025

Background information
- Born: Trevon Deronta O'Ryan Echols; July 15, 2002 (age 24); Athens, Georgia, U.S.
- Genres: Trap; rage; cloud rap
- Occupation: Rapper
- Years active: 2024–present
- Labels: Create; Mercury; Studio Addicts; YSL

Trevon Deronta O'Ryan Echols (born July 15, 2002), known professionally as Nine Vicious, is an American rapper. He has released three studio albums, Tumblr Music and For Nothing in 2025, and his third studio album, Emotions, released the following year. He released the mixtape Sedition on September 11, 2026.

== Early life ==
Trevon Deronta O'Ryan Echols was born on July 15, 2002, in Athens, Georgia. He attended Athens Christian School, graduating in 2020.

== Career ==
=== 2024–2026: Career beginnings and breakthrough ===
Echols began releasing music professionally in 2024, gaining a following on SoundCloud with the songs "I Love You" and "Ill Nva". He released his first mixtape, Studio Addict, on December 13, 2024. Olivier Lafontant of Pitchfork compared Echols's mixtape Studio Addict to the early work of Young Thug and Ken Carson.

The following year, on March 31, 2025, Echols released his debut studio album Tumblr Music. On June 6, 2025, Echols released the EP B4FN, the prelude to his second studio album, For Nothing, which was released on July 4, 2025.

=== 2026–present: Further releases, B4EM, Emotions, and Sedition ===
On January 31, 2026, Echols released B4EM, a ten-track EP which served as the prelude to his next studio album, Emotions. He would officially release the album on April 3, 2026. In March of that year, he featured twice as a vocalist on American rapper Kanye West's twelfth studio album, Bully, appearing on the tracks "Mama's Favorite" and "This a Must". On May 9, 2026, Echols made his Rolling Loud debut. On August 14, 2026, Echols was featured on "Kidding Me" off of NDA by Trippie Redd. On September 11, 2026, Echols released the mixtape Sedition.

== Controversies ==
=== Sexual misconduct allegations ===
In February 2025, Echols gained controversy for allegedly trying to groom a then 16-year-old girl in a text message while pretending to be a 17-year-old when he was 19–20. He later admitted to the allegations in the song "Clout Demons", stating "I know I fucked up, I admit I was horny" and compared the controversy to XXXTentacion's controversies.

=== Altercation with Che ===
In July 2026, Echols was involved in a public altercation with rapper Che following an ongoing online feud. Social media users shared footage showing the two and their groups getting into a physical altercation inside a department store close to a Balenciaga kiosk. After the incident, Echols uploaded pictures of a chain on social media and claimed to have snatched Che's chain. Che refuted the allegation, claiming the chain displayed did not belong to him and shared videos showing himself wearing a chain. No criminal charges were reported.

=== Phoenix concert incident ===
On August 18, 2026, at The Van Buren in Phoenix, Arizona. Echols' sold-out concert was shut down after technical incidents with the sound aggravated him, causing him to tell his fans to mess up the music venue, where he stated "I want you to mess up this venue … because they're playing with me." Following the sound incident, Echols would continue to express his disappointment, according to fans, he took off a worker's headset and threw it to the ground causing the two to argue. 20 minutes later, lights were turned off and it was announced that the concert had ended.

Around 9 p.m. law enforcement arrived after aggravated fans chose not to leave. To address the situation, officers began using pepper spray on fans who chose not to leave. Despite the incident, nobody was arrested or injured, and refunds have been requested.

== Discography ==
=== Studio albums ===
Title	Details	Peak chart positions
Title	Details	US
Tumblr Music	Released: March 31, 2025; Label: Self-released; Formats: Digital download, streaming	—
For Nothing	Released: July 4, 2025; Label: Self-released; Formats: Digital download, streaming	—
Emotions	Released: April 3, 2026; Label: Studio Addicts, Create Music; Formats: Digital download, streaming	102

=== Mixtapes ===
Title	Details
Studio Addict	Released: December 13, 2024; Label: Self-released; Formats: Digital download, streaming
Sedition	Released: September 11, 2026; Label: Studio Addicts, Create Music; Formats: Digital download, streaming

=== Extended plays ===
Title	Details
B4SA	Released: November 15, 2024; Label: Self-released; Formats: Digital download, streaming
B4TM	Released: January 31, 2025; Label: Self-released; Formats: Digital download, streaming
B4FN	Released: June 6, 2025; Label: Self-released; Formats: Digital download, streaming
B4EM	Released: January 31, 2026; Label: Studio Addicts, Create Music; Formats: Digital download, streaming

=== Singles ===
Title	Year	Album
"U Fancy ?"	2024	Non-album singles
"U Bad"	2024	Non-album singles
"All Facts"	2024	Non-album singles
"Cant Stop This"	2024	Non-album singles
"My Speakers"	2024	Non-album singles
"Sobs"	2025	Non-album singles
"Over N Over"	2026	Non-album singles

=== Guest appearances ===
Title	Year	Other artist(s)	Album
"Hittin"	2024	406ahmad	Life of Ahmad 2
"Know I Did"	2024	406ahmad	Life of Ahmad 2
"Groupie"	2024	406ahmad	Life of Ahmad 2
"Tumblr Love Story"	2024	406ahmad	Life of Ahmad 2
"No Kap"	2025	1300Saint	—N/a
"AR Inna Trenchcoat"	2025	Pradabagshawty	B What You B
"RedFlag"	2025	Apollo Red	Tantrum
"Blood Thicker Than Water"	2025	406ahmad	Life of Ahmad 2.5
"Ain't No End"	2025	406ahmad	Life of Ahmad 2.5
"U Fine Shit"	2025	406ahmad	Life of Ahmad 2.5
"This or That"	2025	Yung Kayo	—N/a
"In Trouble"	2025	1300Saint	Saint Season
"Blakk Trukk"	2025	1300Saint	Saint Season
"Story of Nine V"	2025	406ahmad	40.6FM® # Tuned Back In
"Pinned"	2025	406ahmad	40.6FM® # Tuned Back In
"Shavon"	2025	406ahmad	40.6FM® # Tuned Back In
"Pay for It"	2025	1300Saint	4
"Foreign Shit"	2025	1300Saint	4
"Wooo"	2025	NDO Dee	Life After Death
"Slime Yo Ass"	2025	808eight	7
"Bad Bitch Fetish"	2025	Apollo Red	ApolloRed1 vs the World
"Lights"	2025	Apollo Red	—N/a
"Grinch"	2026	1300Saint	—N/a
"Mami"	2026	1300Saint	Savior: +++
"EA"	2026	1300Saint	Savior: +++
"Mama's Favorite"	2026	Kanye West	Bully
"This a Must"	2026	Kanye West	Bully
"Unfortunate"	2026	R8	Dawn Chorus
"Free Mind"	2026	R8	Dawn Chorus
"Patience"	2026	R8	Dawn Chorus
"Kidding Me"	2026	Trippie Redd	NDA
