= Yung Fazo =

American rapper and singer (born 2005)

- Also known as: Lil Faze
- Born: Fazan Ally Munshi; April 14, 2005 (age 21); New York City, U.S.
- Genres: Hip-hop; rage; trap; pop-rap; melodic rap
- Occupations: Rapper; singer; songwriter; record producer
- Years active: 2019–present
- Label: Capitol
- Member of: 1stClassAngels, Fifteenhunnid, Underd_gs, Ø Way

Fazan Ally Munshi (born April 14, 2005), known professionally as Yung Fazo, is an American singer, rapper, and record producer from New York City. In 2021, he released the song "Adding", featuring fellow rapper SoFaygo, which went viral on TikTok and currently sits at over 50 million streams on Spotify as of February 2025. His song "TTWLG (This the Way Life Goes)" has also gained virality.

== Early life ==
Fazan Ally Munshi was born on April 14, 2005, in Queens, New York. Munshi grew up playing the trumpet. He would also play a lot of video games, especially on his Game Boy. Yung Fazo shortly attended high school at Wellington C Mepham in Bellmore, New York. Fazo would dabble in music, recording a diss track with its own music video in 2017. However, he wouldn't take music seriously until 2019 when he would begin to record tracks with his childhood friend Raeusi. He would record under the moniker Lil Faze before forgoing with it and adopting his current name, Yung Fazo.

== Career ==
=== 2019–2021: Breakthrough and EP release ===
On September 2, 2019, Yung Fazo released "Adding" with frequent collaborator SoFaygo, propelling Fazo's name into the underground rap scene. Immediately after the release, Fazo released his second EP, #frvralone. Following the release of his EP, Fazo released his second biggest song of the year, "TTWLG (This the Way Life Goes)", which also went viral.

=== 2022–present: Signing to Capitol and major releases ===
In 2022, he signed with Capitol Records and released his major-label debut, ME VS ME. Yung Fazo made his first-ever debut at Rolling Loud, California, marking his first festival performance. Fazo later released his long-awaited debut studio album, ZO. On November 23, 2025, Yung Fazo performed at Rolling Loud India for the second time, except in his ancestral country India, where he had his own set.

=== 2026–present: UY SCUTI BOYZ collaboration ===
On April 17, 2026, Fazo was featured on the track "Baby" with Tezzus and Southsidesillhouette off Tezzus and Diamond's* mixtape UY SCUTI BOYZ. Then, on May 10, 2026 Fazo performed again at Rolling Loud Orlando.

== Musical style ==
Fazo's musical style was described by NPR's music critic Sheldon Pearce as "moving at warp speed, down to the pitched-up, distorted vocals that feel like they're blurring by you as you listen." Pearce also went on to say how Fazo's rap sounds as if he were from a cartoon. Pearce stated Fazo's "exists in the same sonic ecosystem as nu-trap characters like Yeat and SSGKobe and former Slayworld collective members like Autumn! and Summrs." According to Antonio Johri of Complex, he wrote how Yung Fazo brings a more "mainstream-ready, melodic edge" to his tracks and features. Additionally, Johri stated how Yung Fazo's vocal inflection is reminiscent to that of Playboi Carti's baby voice and "triplet flows".

== Dallas shooting incident ==
On July 12, 2025, Yung Fazo performed in Dallas, Texas. Approximately two songs into his set, shots were reported to have been fired in the venue, leading to an immediate cancellation of the concert. An Instagram post confirmed the cancellation with the caption "Yung Fazo's show in Dallas was unfortunately cancelled after shots fired in the venue." A more formal account appeared in local Dallas media, documenting a Fourth of July-weekend shooting in Dallas's Deep Ellum entertainment district. No one at the concert was injured, though one person outside of the concert died.

== Personal life ==
Yung Fazo was born in New York City on April 14, 2005, and spent the first eight years of his life in Guyana before moving back with his family to Jamaica, Queens in New York. Although he is Guyanese, he has ethnic backgrounds hailing back to India. In an interview with Hiphopnmore, Fazo stated that his favorite artists are Chief Keef, Michael Jackson, and Prince.

== Tours ==
- Paint the World Blue (2025)

== Discography ==
=== Studio albums ===
Title	Details
ZO	Released: February 7, 2025; Label: UMG (Capitol); Format: Digital download, streaming

=== Mixtapes ===
Title	Details
ME VS ME	Released: November 4, 2022; Label: UMG (Capitol); Format: Digital download, streaming

=== EPs ===
Title	Details
#frvralone	Released: September 30, 2021; Label: Independent; Format: Digital download, streaming
