= Tezzus & Diamond* =

American hip-hop duo

Background information
- Also known as: UY Scuti Bøyz
- Origin: Atlanta, Georgia, U.S.
- Genres: Hip-hop; rage; trap; phonk
- Years active: 2020–present
- Label: YSL
- Member of: Ø Way
- Members: Tezzus; Diamond*

Tezzus & Diamond* are an American hip-hop duo that was formed in Atlanta, Georgia in 2020. Signed to YSL Records and affiliated with the collective Ø Way, their debut collaborative mixtape, UY Scuti Bøyz, was released in April 2026.

== Career ==
=== Early career (2015–2024) ===
Tezzus (T'Corrian Walton) (born July 3, 2000) is from South Atlanta. Diamond* (Misonn Scott) (born July 2, 1998) was born in Cleveland, Georgia, but was raised in Mechanicsville, Georgia. During Scott’s time in Atlanta, he worked a plethora of jobs, including at a post office.

Walton began rapping in 2015 but began taking it seriously in 2018. In 2020, Walton met Scott through social media as a weed supplier, which later led to both meeting in real life. After the two met, they grew close, and their relationship led Scott to quit his job and pursue a music career. That same year, after moving to New York, Walton began living with another American rapper, affiliate, and fashion model, Pz'.

=== Signing to YSL, UY Scuti Bøyz (2025-present) ===
Scott released his album Nø Idøls in 2025, which featured Tezzus & Diamond*'s breakout single "Bada Bing, Bada Bøøm". Following the virality of the single, Walton and Scott signed with YSL Records. Following their signings, Young Thug would bring out Scott and Walton at ComplexCon 2026 to perform "Bada Bing, Bada Bøøm". Walton and Scott featured on Sk8star's "NSD" off his 2026 album Designer Junkie.

Walton and Scott released UY Scuti Bøyz, their debut collaborative mixtape under YSL Records on April 17, 2026. On May 8, 2026, Tezzus & Diamond* made their debut at Rolling Loud in Orlando, Florida. On June 14, 2026, Walton and Scott are performing at Summer Smash 2026. On July 11, 2026, it was announced that Tezzus and Diamond* would be supporting casts to the "YSL New Generation Tour", which is hosted by Young Thug. Subsequently, the two were featured on majority of Slime Language 3.

=== Solo work ===
==== Tezzus ====
Walton released his debut project, titled Tezzus Khrist in 2024. The project gained notable attention from media outlets, such as Pitchfork, which wrote that Walton's album would have been in contention for "rookie of the year" in the music industry. Walton released a collaborative album with Percaso titled Søufside in 2025. On August 18, 2025, he would release King Phønk and would later follow through with Tezzy Pendergrass on September 18, 2025. In 2026, Walton would release a slew of singles as well as make guest appearances on Sk8star's "Yeannn" off of his album titled Designer Junkie, and on "Dog" with Skaiwater off of their album titled Wonderful. Walton would make another guest appearance on B6's and Warhol.SS's April 2026 project, titled I Can't Feel My Face, where he, along with Diorvsyou, was featured on "Baddie Stranger". He released his EP, titled The Resurrectiøn, on June 7, 2026. On August 28, 2026, Walton was featured on Trippie Redd's companion album #NDA. On September 25, 2026, Tezzus released a two-track EP titled RichPhønks with Che, the EP also has a guest appearance from Diamond*. On November 13, 2026, Tezzus released Mømma Bøyz.

==== Diamond* ====
In his interview with Hypebeast, Scott began making music in 2015, with his first release being in September of that year, titled "906 Freestyle," coming in September of that year. Scott released his album Nø Idøls in 2025. Scott featured on "Zoot" off of Skaiwater's 2026 album, Wonderful. On July 8, 2026, Scott surprise released his mixtape Bling Slime Vøl 1, which was hosted by DJ Holiday and had features from Young Thug, Sk8star, Pz', Lil Righteous, and Southsidesillhouette. Olivier Lafontant of Pitchfork rated the project a 7.5, stating how poised he is with his "acrobatic punch-ins" and "glitzy production". Following the release, Scott would release the deluxe edition to the project, titled Bling Bøi Ep 2: Høsted by Dj Høliday, it also served as a sequel to his August 2025 EP Bling Boi EP. The project featured seven tracks, and guest appearances from the already heard Pz', and Southsidesillhouette, but saw new appearances from Ea Tj, and Pradabagshawty.

== Personal life ==
=== Tezzus ===
On August 22, 2018, Walton was arrested after he was involved in a killing in which he and two others robbed someone and shot the person after they tried to defend themselves. On July 13, 2026, explicit images of Walton and American singer and producer Ilykimchi engaging in sexual activities were leaked online. The images raised stronger reactions and concerns as Yew was in a relationship with American producer Oogie Mane. Following the leaks, Walton decided to follow up the controversy with a diss preview towards Mane.

== Musical style ==
Walton is known for his brash style of rapping and aggressive style of music, blending trap and rage. Olivier Lafontant, writer for Pitchfork wrote how Walton oscillates between toothy glee and fang-bearing aggression in the blink of an eye. Claiming how he needs "a drop of blood," comparing Walton's style to that of Eren Yeager, claiming how he needs that to get into mode. In a 2025 interview, Walton stated how he would study Michael Jackson and Tupac when it came to finding out his musical style. Walton claimed that he needed to study the older generation to gain some understanding. Antonio Johri of Complex wrote on Walton's versatility, as he can switch between "melodic Auto-Tuned vocals to "scream-rap" vocals.

Scott's musical style, compared to his contemporaries, is more chill and laid-back. Vivian Medithi of The Fader wrote how Scott's "singsong flow" allows him to "skate" across any beat given. Johri wrote how Scott raps about his hedonistic lifestyle with a "tranquil and euphoric" approach.

Media critics have highlighted the duo's chemistry and ability to rap off each other.

== Discography ==
=== Mixtapes ===
- UY Scuti Bøyz (2026)

=== Individual works ===
==== Tezzus ====
- Tezzus Khrist (2024)
- Søufside (with Percaso) (2025)
- King Phønk (2025)
- Tezzy Pendergrass (2025)
- The Ressurectiøn (EP) (2026)
- RichPhønks (with Che) (EP) (2026)
- Mømma Bøyz (EP) (2026)

==== Diamond* ====
- Nø Idøls (2025)
- Bling Slime Vøl 1 (2026)
- Bling Bøi Ep 2: Høsted by Dj Høliday (2026)
