= Yung Kayo =

American rapper

- Born: Malachi Green; November 29, 2003 (age 22); Washington, D.C., U.S
- Genres: Hip hop; trap; rage
- Occupations: Rapper; songwriter; model
- Years active: 2013-present
- Labels: YSL; 300

Malachi Green (born November 29, 2003), professionally known as Yung Kayo, is an American rapper, songwriter, and model from Washington, D.C. who is currently signed to American rapper Young Thug's record label YSL Records in a joint venture with 300 Entertainment. He is known for his fashion-related references in his music and eccentric vocal performance.

== Early and personal life ==
Green's father was a DJ. As a teenager, he moved to Los Angeles from Washington, D.C., his native city. According to Green, he stated how he alternates between living in L.A. and D.C., stating how he spends about six to seven months in L.A. and spends the rest of the time back in his hometown.

== Career ==
Green began rapping at the age of 9 after his older brother purchased a microphone. He would rap with group 40 Boyz which was composed of himself and his brothers. In 2019, he released his song "Glitch" which captured the attention of American rapper Young Thug. In January 2020, he signed to the latter's record label YSL Records in a joint venture with 300 Entertainment. In 2020, he was featured as a model for Vogue's Spring 2020 Alyx Menswear fashion show.

On April 16, 2021, the YSL Records album Slime Language 2 was released, which features Green on two tracks: "Proud of You" with Lil Uzi Vert, and "GFU". In May 2021, he released his single "Bstroy Socks". In January 2022, he released his single "Yeet" with American rapper Yeat which serves as the lead single to his album DFTK. In February 2022, he released his album DFTK. In July 2022, he and Yeat collaborated with the Sevensevenseven imprint and released a single titled "Hollon". In November 2022, he released the single "150" for his upcoming EP Nineteen. On November 29, 2022, on his 19th birthday, he released his EP Nineteen with an appearance from late American rapper and YSL Records signee Lil Keed.

After staying quiet for all of 2023 and the majority of 2024, with only releasing a few singles, Green would return on November 29, 2024, to release his album Holy Grails, a month later, on December 31, he would follow through with the deluxe for the project. Following the release, Green would stay quiet throughout 2025, with him just releasing only a couple of singles. Then, he would enter 2026 with intentions of releasing a new project. On April 2, 2026, he would release "Cult" with SoFaygo, and "Kmon" with Rico Nasty, which served as the lead singles to his next project titled Komodo. A day later, he would officially release the project, which had features from the already-heard SoFaygo, Rico Nasty, and introduced Jugg as the third and final feature.

== Musical style ==
Green is a member of the D.C. rap movement. In a generally positive review for Yung Kayo's album DFTK, Paul A. Thompson, writing for Pitchfork describes Yung Kayo's musical style in the following manner: "DFTK is not a comprehensive survey of everything Kayo can do as a vocalist. It smartly excises the flatter, more predictable modes he occasionally lapsed into on his earlier EPs, instead finding him at his most concentratedly chaotic, a steady dose of ungovernable energy." Alphonse Pierre of Pitchfork wrote how DTFK served as a notable mixtape that pushed the boundaries rage rap for the better.

== Discography ==
=== Album ===
- DFTK (2022)
- Holy Grails (2024)
- Holy Grails +++ (2024)
- Komodo (2026)

=== EPs ===
- Work in Progress (2021)
- Nineteen (2022)

=== Singles ===
List adapted from Apple Music.

Title	Year	Album
"Outlet"	2018	Non-album singles
"Glitch"	2019	Non-album singles
"Messi (with Shabazz PBG)"	2019	Non-album singles
"+ + +"	2019	Non-album singles
"- - -"	2019	Non-album singles
"Vetements Jeans"	2019	Non-album singles
"Sweet16 (with XanMan)"	2019	Non-album singles
"U n i"	2020	Non-album singles
"Tell Me"	2020	Non-album singles
"Bstroy Socks" (with Young Stoner Life)	2021	Non-album singles
"Not In The Mood"	2021	Non-album singles
"It's a Monday."	"2022"	DFTK
"Yeet" (with Yeat)	"2022"	DFTK
"Hollon" (with Sevensevenseven and Yeat)	"2022"	Non-album singles
"150"	"2022"	Non-album singles
"Look In The Cup"	"2023"	Non-album singles
"Move" (with Strapped!)	"2023"	Non-album singles
"Bye"	"2024"	Non-album singles
"Godfather" (with Sad Night Dynamite)	"2024"	Non-album singles
"This or That" (with Nine Vicious)	"2025"	Non-album singles
"Walking"	"2025"	Non-album singles
"Cult" (with SoFaygo)	"2026"	Komodo
"Kmon" (with Rico Nasty)	"2026"	Komodo
