= Rage (music genre) =

Subgenre of hip-hop music

- Other names: Rage music; rage rap; rage beats; hyper-trap
- Stylistic origins: Hip-hop; trap; punk rap; cloud rap; rap metal; EDM; future bass; plugg; hyperpop; trap metal; emo rap
- Cultural origins: Late 2010s and early 2020s, United States
- Typical instruments: Drum machine; autotune; synthesizer; pitch shifter; sampler; hi-hats

Regional scenes
- Brazil; United Kingdom

Other topics
- SoundCloud rap; internet rap; EDM trap; tread; rap rock; digicore

Rage (also known as rage music, rage beats or rage rap) is a subgenre of trap music that originated in the United States in the late 2010s. The early rage sound was characterized by short, looping, stereo-widened, future bass-influenced synthesizer lead hooks and basic, energetic trap rhythms. Among the early pioneers of rage rap were Playboi Carti, Lil Uzi Vert and Trippie Redd. Producer F1lthy helped develop a template for the style through his collective Working on Dying with members such as Bnyx.

By the 2020s, the genre had developed through the influence of Carti's 2020 album Whole Lotta Red, with primary production credits from producer F1lthy. Artists such as Destroy Lonely and Ken Carson on Carti's Opium label, along with Yeat and SoFaygo, contributed to the popularization of the style. Mainstream artists such as PlaqueBoyMax, Don Toliver, Travis Scott, and Lil Yachty also released rage tracks. Rage would evolve into a more extreme and experimental sound with artists such as OsamaSon, Che, Slayr, Nettspend, Prettifun, Edward Skeletrix, Bleood, 2Slimey and Lucy Bedroque. This style was defined by the use of bass heavy and distorted 808s, screamed autotune vocals and aggressive production.

Underground rappers such as Tezzus, Nine Vicious, Yung Fazo, Yung Kayo, Ian, and 1300Saint, alongside rap collectives ØWay, Slime Krew, and YVL would also release rage tracks. The genre has been cited as an influence on the development of the 2020s UK underground rap scene, influencing artists such as Lancey Foux, Fimiguerrero, Fakemink, EsDeeKid, zukovstheworld, among others.

== Etymology ==
The term "rage" in reference to the microgenre comes from "Miss the Rage", a track made in 2021 by Trippie Redd and Playboi Carti whose title references mosh pits during rap concerts that Trippie Redd longed for during COVID-19 lockdowns. In the context of the title, "rage" means to mosh. The concept of "rages" at rap concerts and the use of the term "rage" in hip-hop music predate the rage genre itself. The first person to use the term "rage" in the context of hip-hop is said to be Kid Cudi, with his "Mr. Rager" alter ego, which influenced Travis Scott who later adopted the term "rage" and made it an important part of his own aesthetic. During the 2010s, multiple artists and critics used the word "rage" in the context of hip-hop, mostly either referring to overdriven energetic sound or the moshing that would ensue at rap shows, examples being Lil Uzi Vert's Luv Is Rage (2015) and Luv Is Rage 2 (2017) releases.

== Characteristics ==
Rage is mainly characterized by the use of stereo-widened EDM-influenced lead synthesizer patches, reminiscent of the 1980s and 1990s game soundtracks and of trance music, used to play short, often emotional, melodies arranged in short loops which repeat throughout the song, and a basic, "dull", trap beat, accompanying these melodies, with bouncy, often overdriven, heavy and elastic 808s bass notes. In terms of vocal delivery, many rappers draw influence from the vocal stylings of Playboi Carti. Rapper Trippie Redd cited XXXTentacion as an influence on the genre.

Rage has been described as futuristic, electric, and synth-driven. Vivian Medithi of HipHopDX described rage as a sound rooting in plugg music legacy with more electronic influences. Tom Breihan of Stereogum described rage beats as glitchy and as "a cheap, functional type of beat — the type of beat that seems to spring almost entirely from the "type beats" that have proliferated on YouTube in the past few years — but its cheapness is disorienting and sometimes even psychedelic".

=== Influences ===
Synth hooks play such a role in rage that the whole sound has been described as a "hybrid genre of trap music and EDM". Early rage synth leads drew influence from EDM and electronic musicians, such as the Chainsmokers, Skrillex, Diplo, Zedd, Rustie and others. It has also been noticed that often EDM synth hooks in rage come from pre-packaged EDM melody packs, for instance, a guitar-driven "high-octane" EDM loop from "Miss the Rage" came from the royalty-free EDM sample pack by Cymatics, called Cymatics Odyssey EDM Sample Pack. Underground rapper Yeat has also made it popular to use chiming bell sounds, once popular in earlier trap and drill music, in rage beats.

== History ==
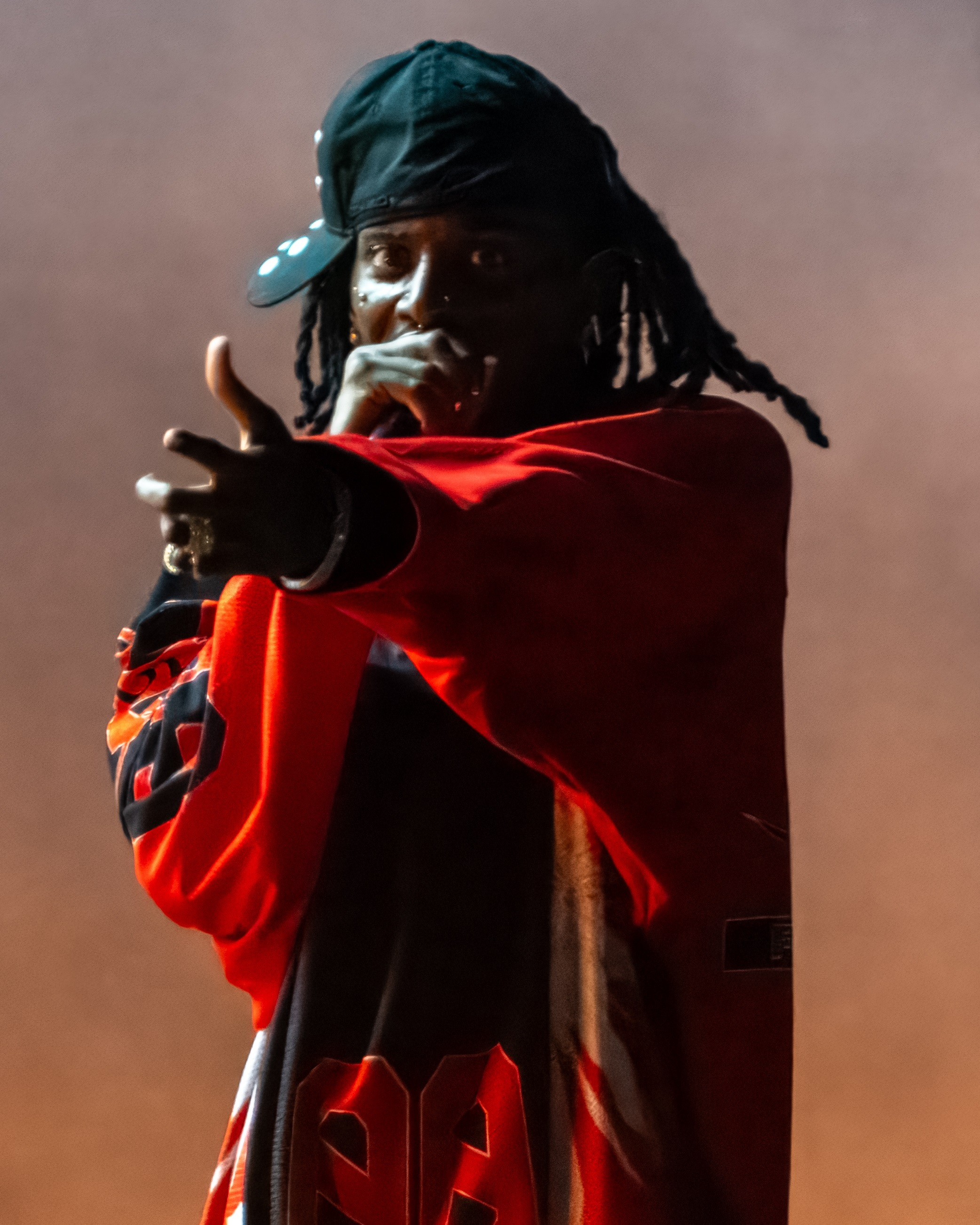
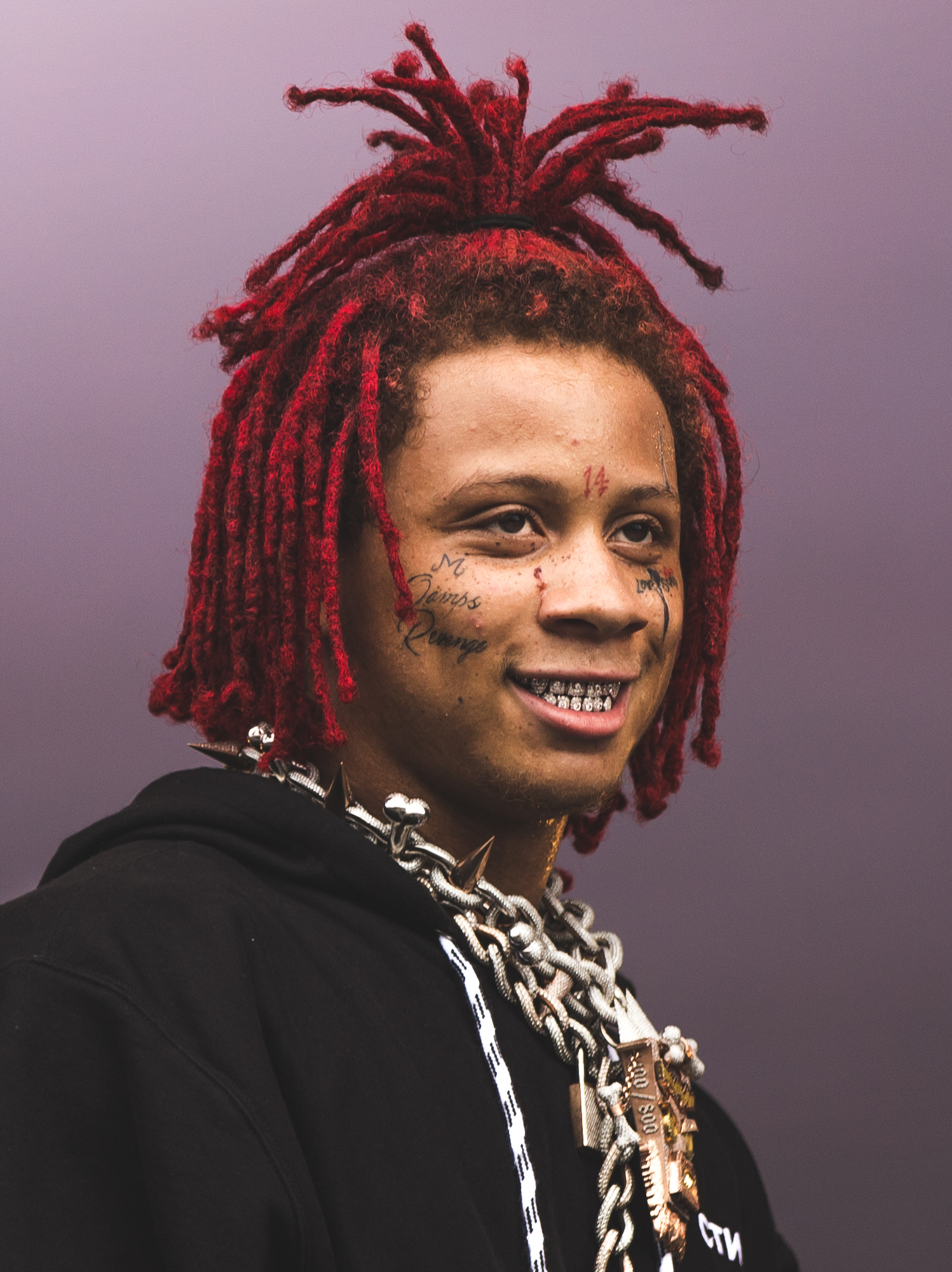
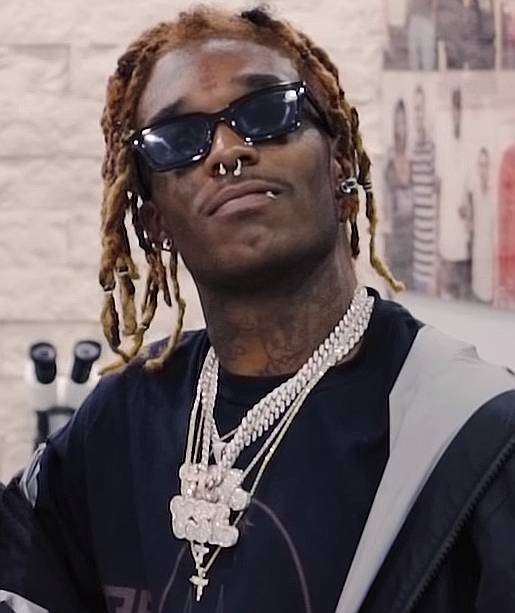
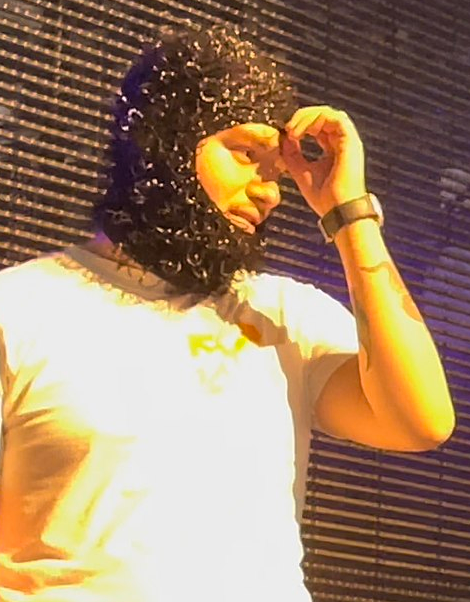
Pioneers of rage: Playboi Carti (top left), Trippie Redd (top right), Lil Uzi Vert (bottom left), and Yeat (bottom right)

=== 2010s: Origins ===
Among the immediate precursors of rage are beats made by Mike Will Made It, beats made by Dun Deal and C4 for 1017 Thug by Young Thug, and beats by Metro Boomin and Southside from the mid-2010s. Metro produced Future's 2015 song "I Serve the Base", which has been described as an early rage track. Abo Kado, writing for Mikiki, suggested that rage beats primarily evolved from the production styles of Pi'erre Bourne, Maaly Raw, and F1lthy, all of whom integrated trap music and synthesizer melodies in their beats, derived strong influence from video game music, and also worked closely with rappers Playboi Carti and Lil Uzi Vert. The production style of Pi'erre Bourne and the music of Lil Uzi Vert were, in turn, influenced by the music of Wiz Khalifa and producer Sledgren, who sometimes incorporated video game samples in their music and were, in turn, influenced by early attempts to fuse European synthesizer-based music with hip-hop and contemporary R&B during the 2000s by Polow Da Don and others.

=== 2020s: Development and popularity ===
"Fly All Night"
An audio sample of an early 2020s rage beat.

Playboi Carti has often been suggested as either an originator or primary popularizer of rage, laying the foundation of the genre on his 2018 album Die Lit, mostly produced by Pi'erre Bourne. It's also often suggested that the foundation of rage had been laid with Playboi Carti's Whole Lotta Red, released in 2020 and mostly produced by F1lthy. Despite its initially mixed reception, the album would come to largely define the genre, with much of what came after either heavily influenced by or trying to directly replicate the album's style.

==== 2021–2023 ====
The genre's popularity and breakthrough is also attributed to the 2021 single "Miss the Rage" by Trippie Redd and Playboi Carti. Without an established term for its specific musical style, "Miss the Rage" was initially described as trap metal and, by Trippie Redd himself, hyperpop. Along with Whole Lotta Red, "Miss the Rage" was influential in defining the rage genre, with multiple producers and rappers adopting the style after the single was released. Rapper Mario Judah went on to release his reproduced version of "Miss the Rage", since the main loop for the instrumental of "Miss the Rage" was based on a royalty-free melody loop. Trippie Redd later went on to solidify the genre's popularity from "Miss the Rage", releasing the primarily rage album Trip at Knight and expressing his fascination with rage rap. Popular rapper Drake, whose tactic is often to showcase lesser-known genres and styles in his albums, released the rage-influenced track "What's Next" in 2021 on his EP Scary Hours 2. The instrumental from "What's Next", produced by Maneesh and Supah Mario, has been repeatedly likened to tracks from Whole Lotta Red. "What's Next" reached the top position on the Billboard Hot 100 chart.

Playboi Carti's record label Opium has been an influential force in the genre, with artists such as Ken Carson, Destroy Lonely, and Homixide Gang signed to the label. The label has had several notable rage releases, such as Ken Carson's 2021 album Project X and Destroy Lonely's 2022 mixtape No Stylist, which have had commercial success and have received a positive reception from fans, as they continue to push the genre to the mainstream. SoFaygo, another early adopter of the rage sound, released his 2020 single "Off the Map", which has been described as either closely resembling rage rap or being a proper rage song. After releasing "Off the Map", SoFaygo went to collaborate with Trippie Redd on "MP5", a track from Trip at Knight, and with Lil Yachty on "Solid".

That same year, due to TikTok, Yeat started releasing a more chaotic and dark version of rage rap, noted for abundant use of bell samples, after multiple of his songs ("Sorry Bout That" and "Mad Bout That" among them) became popular on the platform. After becoming popular on TikTok, Yeat's music was noticed by the likes of Lil Yachty and Drake. After that, Yeat went on to release two rage albums in 2021 and 2022, titled Up 2 Me and 2 Alive, showcasing his signature darker rage sound.

Although rage has been referred to as "formulaic" and been deemed a "probable dead-end subgenre" by some critics, many lesser-known rappers emerged, using rage in their music, sometimes in experimental fashion, among them artists like Yung Fazo, SSGKobe, Ken Carson, TyFontaine, Snot, Cochise, KayCyy, Ka$hdami, and others. KayCyy performed his rage-influenced "Okay" single to a mere chiptune-influenced synth loop, disregarding trap beat altogether. Matt Ox, an experimental rapper, has also been described as a "rager" for releasing rage tracks such as "Live It Up". Rapper KanKan's 2021 album RR has been described as heavily influenced by the rage sound, Yung Kayo, Young Thug's protégé, was noted for mixing rage with hyperpop and pluggnb, along with other influences, on his 2022 DFTK album. Rapper K Suave has been described as being known for his "flavorful rage melodies".

==== 2024–present: Evolution ====
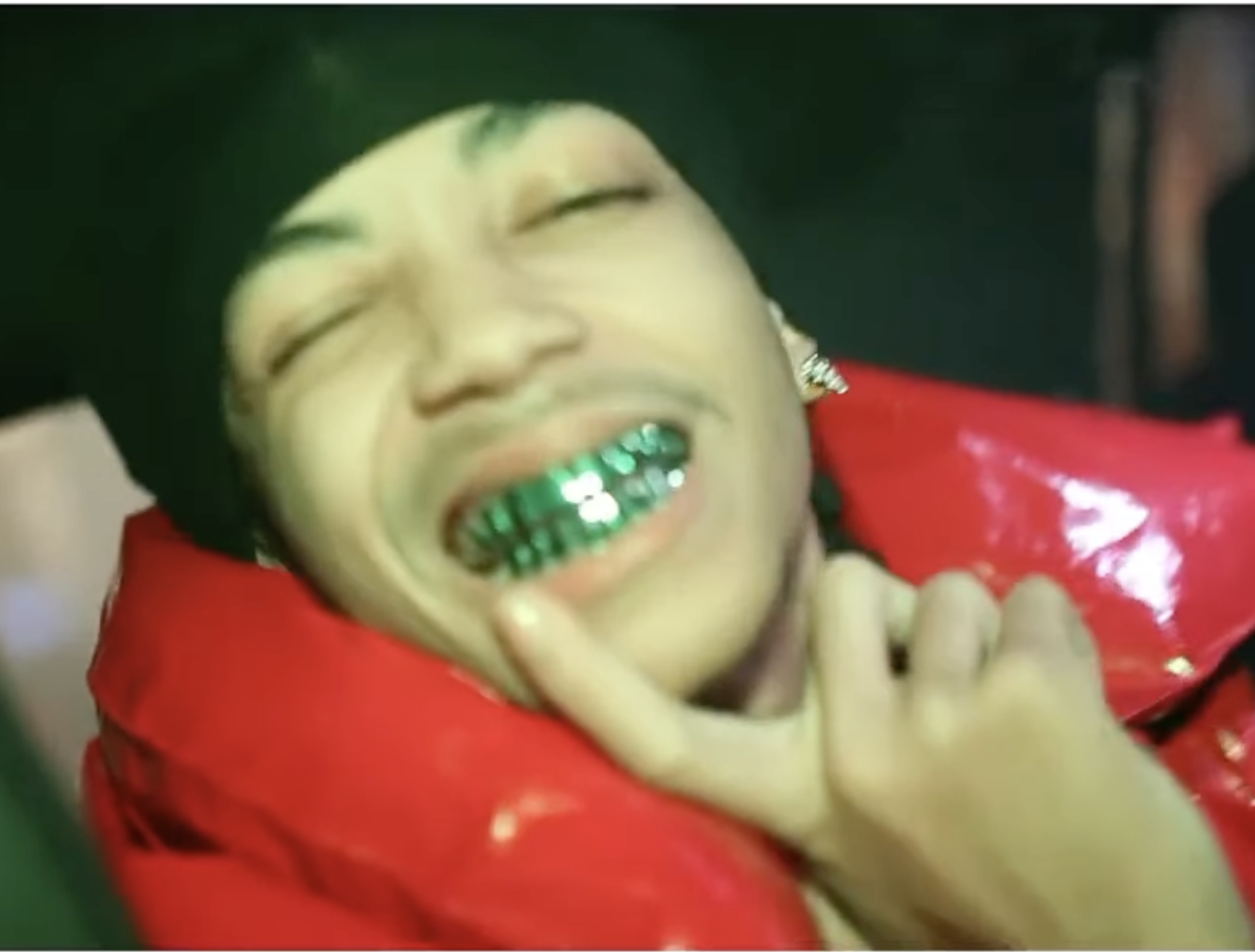
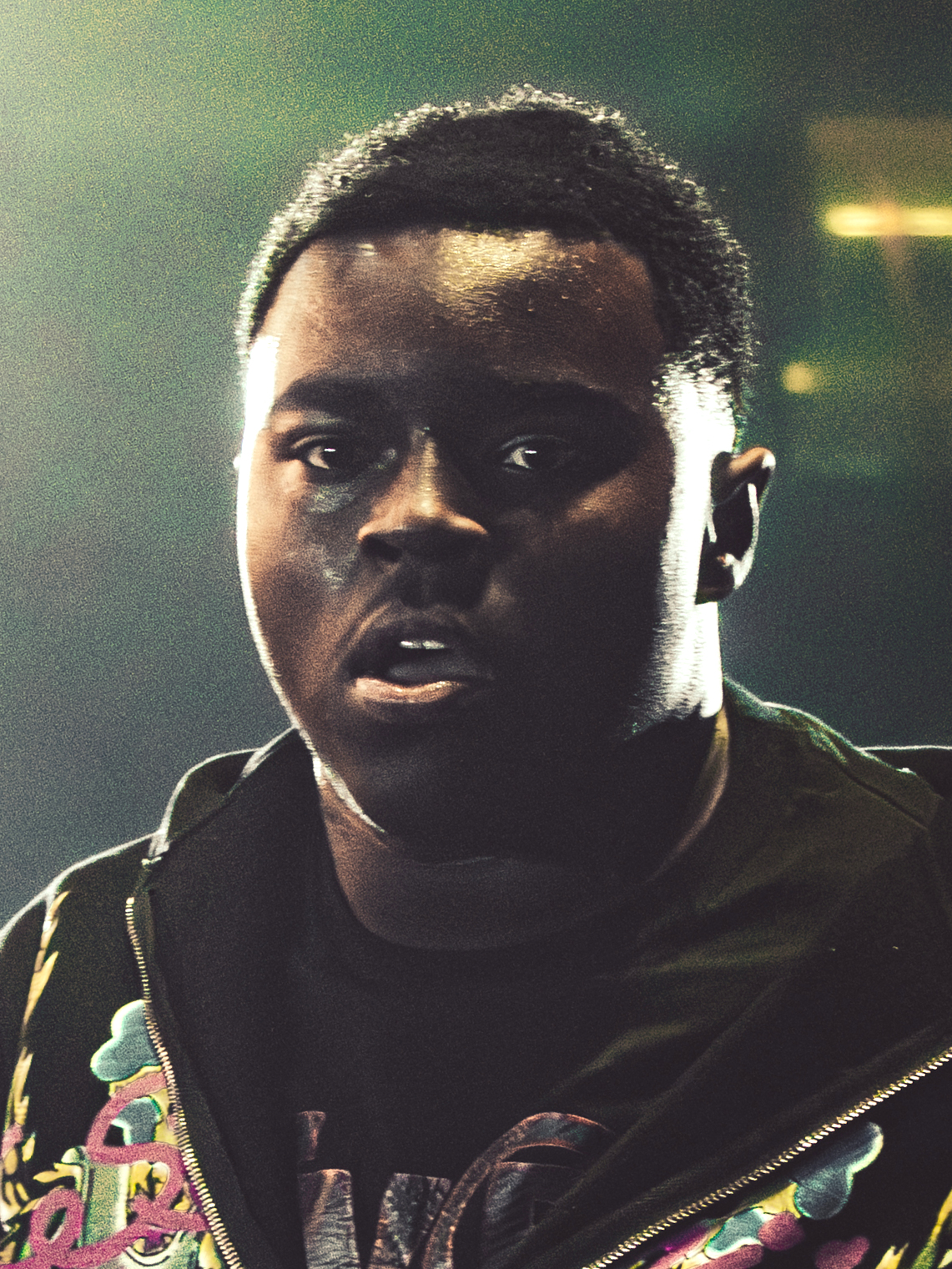
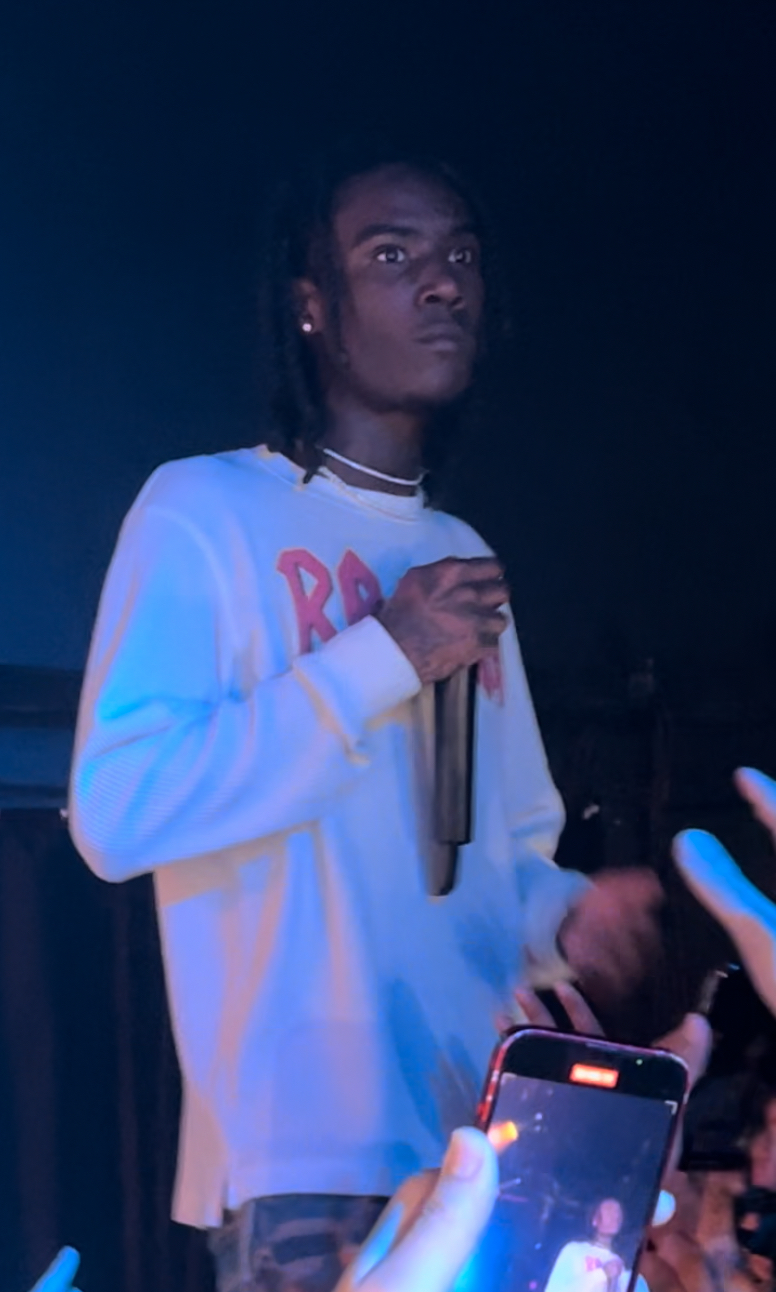
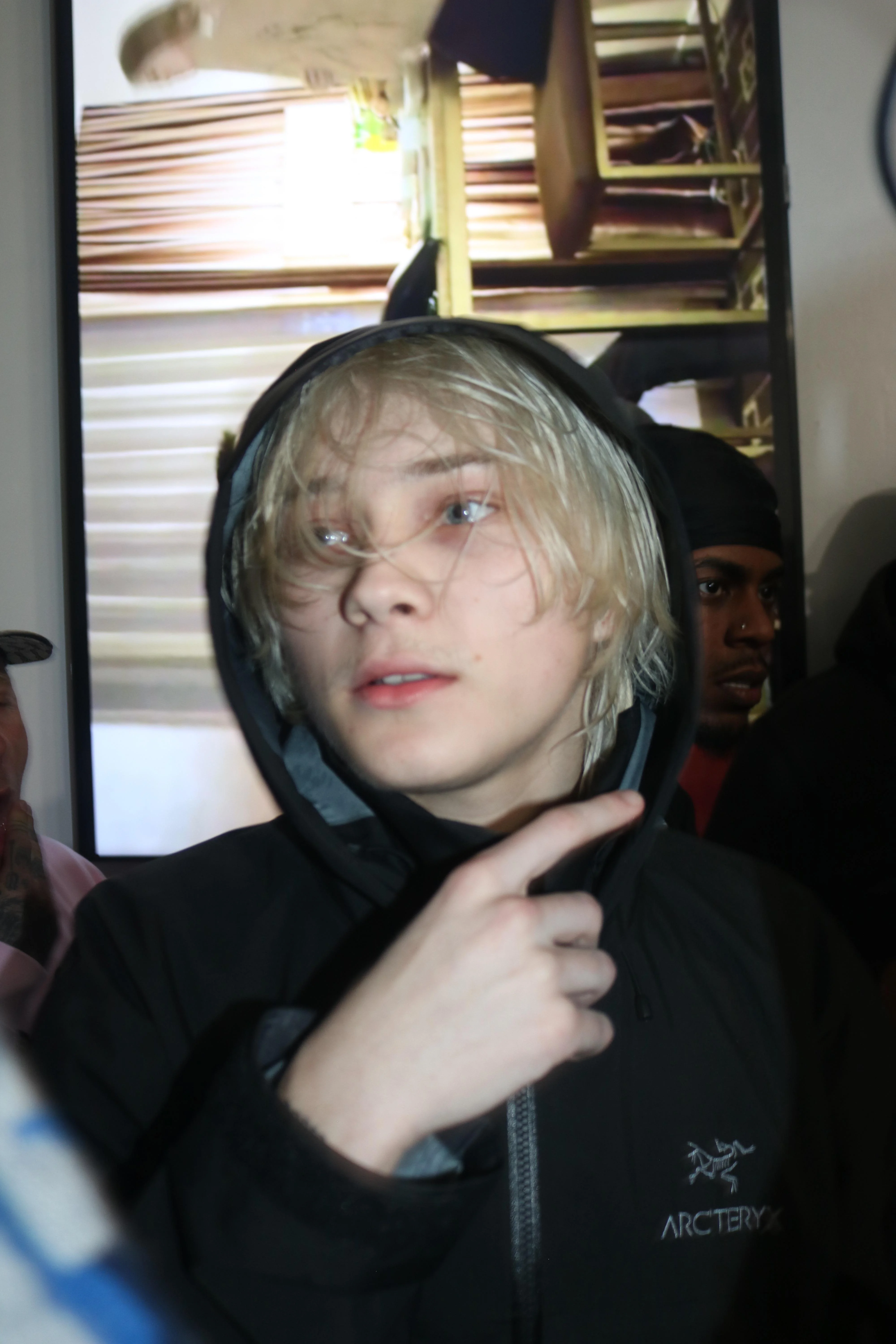
Rage further evolved into a more extreme and experimental sound; examples of artists who showcased this were OsamaSon (bottom left), Che (upper left), Nettspend (bottom right), and Slayr (upper right).

"rest in bass encore + che + bleood type beat"
An audio sample of a mid-2020s rage beat.

By the mid-2020s, rage evolved into a more extreme and experimental sound with artists such as Rexv2, OsamaSon, Che, 2Slimey, Bleood,, Edward Skeletrix, Ezcodylee, 2hollis, Jane Remover, Lucy Bedroque, Prettifun, Slayr, PeruBaby, and Glokk40Spaz. This style was defined by the use of bass heavy 808s and aggressive production, with notable examples emerging in 2025 such as OsamaSon's psykotic, Che's Rest In Bass and 2Slimey's High Anxiety. Osamason would collaborate with rapper Xaviersobased on the rage project BasedSlime. Other notable underground artists released rage rap projects such as Nettspend's Early Life Crisis (2026). Rapper Nine Vicious, at first known for his association with YSL Records, was also described as a rage rapper. The rage scene largely coalesced with the underground hip-hop scene, with other digital rap scenes like jerk, plugg and digicore all being largely intertwined.

Across this same time period, the rage scene would rise to prominence in the Atlanta underground rap scene. Atlanta was already previously noted for having a flourishing hip-hop scene, being widely marketed as the birthplace of trap music and being home to rage pioneer Playboi Carti as well as other influential rappers such as Gucci Mane, Young Thug, Future, and Lil Baby. Members of the Atlanta-based collective Ø Way such as Tezzus, Diamond*, Yung Fazo, Sk8star, Percaso, and Pz' rose to prominence within the scene, in what was widely described as a reconfiguration of Atlanta's underground rap scene. As members of YSL Records, these rappers were co-signed and promoted by Young Thug, with several media outlets proclaiming these rappers as protégés of Young Thug. Similarly, rage pioneer Playboi Carti's collective YVL and record label Opium also retained its prominence in the scene, with rappers such as ApolloRed1 and the duo HXG being affiliated to YVL, while OsamaSon received a co-sign from Opium rapper Ken Carson, who featured him on a track off his rerelease of Xperiment. Fatt Smaxk also collaborated with Playboi Carti on a remix of his track "Smxck or Die". Outside of these collectives, former YSL member Nine Vicious was also noted for his remarkable contributions to the Atlanta rap scene. Fellow Atlanta native Glokk40Spaz, originally affiliated with the plugg scene, also began crossing over into the rage scene, collaborating with OsamaSon on the project 3vil Reflections while also receiving co-signs from YSL members.

=== Regional scenes ===
In the United Kingdom, Lancey Foux, a British rapper, released the album Live.Evil in 2021, which contained rage elements mixed with UK hip-hop. Foux's earlier mixtape, First Degree, was also described as containing rage elements. In India, Colle$ttye, an Indian rapper, released "Bluntonomics" with Wiz Khalifa, a remix to his track "Cgpa", the track was described as containing some rage elements.

== See also ==
- Digicore
- Tread rap
