= YSL Records =

American record label

- Parent company: Warner Music Group
- Founded: 2016
- Founder: Young Thug
- Distributor: 300 Elektra Entertainment
- Genre: Hip-hop, trap
- Country of origin: United States
- Location: Atlanta, Georgia
- Official website: iamuyscuti.com

YSL Records (an initialism for Young Stoner Life Records) is an American record label based in Atlanta, Georgia. It was founded in 2016 by the Atlanta-based rapper Young Thug. The label is an imprint of 300 Entertainment. As of 2026 current acts include Thug himself, Strick, Yung Kayo, Tezzus, 1300Saint and Oruam.

The label was embroiled in a major criminal trial from 2022–2024, with Young Thug, Gunna, and other YSL members arrested and charged with racketeering and various gang-related crimes in violation of Georgia's RICO (Racketeer Influenced and Corrupt Organizations) Act. Authorities alleged that YSL Records is a street gang. In 2024, label head Young Thug was released on probation.

== History ==
=== 2016–2019 ===
The label was announced on November 15, 2016, through a video Young Thug had posted on his Snapchat showcasing his new office. The video also includes a speech by 300 Entertainment co-founder, Kevin Liles, praising the new label. In 2017, the label announced its first signee, fellow Atlanta native Gunna who was also being courted by Thug's mentor and former label Gucci Mane & 1017 Brick Squad Records. During a string of mixtape releases that year, the label would announce further signees to the label with YoungBoy Never Broke Again signing a 5-album joint venture deal with YSL and Atlantic Records after opting against signing with Birdman's Cash Money Records, Lil Duke would also join the label alongside Thug's sisters Dolly and HiDoraah.

On August 15, 2018, Thug announced a mixtape featuring the label's signees, except YoungBoy, titled Slime Language, which he released on his 27th birthday on August 16. On September 12, Lil Baby announced a mixtape with Gunna titled Drip Harder, which was released on October 5 with Baby's label Quality Control.

On February 22, 2019, Gunna released his debut studio album Drip or Drown 2, follow the album's single "One Call", which was accompanied by a music video. On June 14, Lil Keed released his debut studio album Long Live Mexico, which was supported by three singles "Oh My God", "Proud Of Me", and "Pull Up".

=== 2020–2022 ===
On February 28, 2020, Zaytoven released a mixtape with Lil Keed, Lil Gotit, and Lil Yachty titled A-Team. In March, Gunna announced his second album Wunna. Its lead single Skybox was released on March 6, alongside a music video. On March 16, Gunna stated on Twitter that Wunna is an acronym for: "Wealthy Unapologetic N***a Naturally Authentic". On April 3, Young Thug and Gunna released the single "Quarantine Clean", produced by Turbo. The following day, Gunna explained the album had experienced release issues due to the COVID-19 pandemic. The Gunna and Young Thug collaboration was their first released song together since "Diamonds", which was released in December 2019. On August 7, 2020, Lil Keed released his second studio album Trapped on Cleveland 3 through YSL Records. On December 18, 2020, YSL Records released "Take It to Trial", by Young Thug, Gunna and featuring Yak Gotti, the first single off the Slime Language 2 compilation, which followed on April 16, 2021.

=== 2022–2024 ===
On January 7, 2022, Gunna released his third studio album DS4Ever, which served as the fourth and final installment in his Drip Season series. On May 9, 2022, members of YSL were arrested and charged with RICO-related charges stemming from a grand jury indictment filed by Fulton County District Attorney Fani Willis. Both Young Thug and Gunna were among the 28 associates charged and were arrested. On May 13, 2022, YSL artist Lil Keed died at the age of 24. On December 14, 2022, Gunna took an Alford plea and was released from prison.

The trial began on November 27, 2023, following the May 2022 indictment of 28 individuals associated with YSL. It became one of the longest and most expensive criminal trials in Georgia history. It featured two judicial recusals and the arrest of two defense attorneys. There were intense disputes around the meaning of various phrases, including the meaning of the acronym YSL, and the song lyrics of the defendant's records were found to be admissible. Several defendants, including Young Thug and Gunna, entered plea agreements during the trial, resulting in prison sentences and other conditions. Other co-defendants were acquitted. The trial ended on December 3, 2024, with the remaining jury verdicts delivered.

=== 2025–present ===
Following the end of the RICO case, and entering fresh in 2025, Thug would go on to sign Atlanta rapper Nine Vicious after months of co-signing the rapper. The signing of Vicious was confirmed through Lil Gotit. Later, though, after being affiliated with YSL for half of 2025, Vicious left the label after having mixed emotions from both parties, mainly on Vicious' end. Upon his leave, Vicious created his own "FN" clique and later joined the Create Music Group. Despite leaving the label, Vicious still pledges allegiance to Thug’s label. After Vicious' leave, Thug would go on to focus more on Ø Way, an Atlanta-based collective consisting of rising underground artists. From that group, Thug would then go on to sign Atlanta rappers Tezzus and Diamond*. Upon their signing, the duo would go on to release their debut studio album under the label, titled UY SCUTI BØYZ, which would subsequently see Thug being featured twice throughout the project. YSL and Young Thug released Slime Language 3 as the final installment of the album trilogy on August 28, 2026.

== Legal issues ==
From November 27, 2023 until December 3rd, 2024, a racketeering trial involved Young Thug and several associates of YSL. Prosecutors alleged that YSL, which they alleged stands for "Young Slime Life", functioned as a criminal street gang, with label boss Young Thug as the leader of the gang. The trial was the longest criminal trial in the state of Georgia.

On December 14, 2022, Gunna pleaded guilty to a single charge of racketeering and testified that YSL was a criminal gang, as part of an Alford plea. He was sentenced to five years in prison, with one year commuted to time served, and the remainder of the sentence suspended on probation, including 500 hours of community service. On December 17, rappers Slimelife Shawty and Lil Duke also pleaded guilty.

On October 31, 2024, Young Thug was released from jail after he accepted a plea deal and was sentenced to 40 years: 5 years in prison, 15 years of probation, and a backload of 20 years in prison if probation is violated. Young Thug's 5 years in prison has been commuted to time served. Young Thug's release and probation stipulations include: being banned from the Metro Atlanta area for 10 years, unable to make gang-related music, and performance of four annual anti-gang presentations/concerts for Atlanta, alongside having no contact with known gang members or co-defendants (other than Gunna and his biological brother, both of whom were among his co-defendants).

== Culture ==
Many popular rap artists own YSL chains, usually given to them by Young Thug. Lil Uzi Vert, Drake, Lil Baby, Lil Gotit, Ken Carson, and YoungBoy Never Broke Again as-well as the streamer Tota have YSL chains. The official YSL Records Instagram page created a large stir after announcing a project titled Slime Language, which ended up being a compilation album by YSL Records. A phrase commonly mentioned in songs by YSL affiliates is "SLATT" (Slime Love All The Time). The acronym was created by YSL Records founder Young Thug, and was first used back in 2013. CEO, Young Thug, also launched the "SPIDER" clothing brand on December 27, 2019, which has been co-signed by YSL affiliates.

== Notable artists ==
=== Current ===
Act	Year signed	Releases (under the label)
Young Thug	Founder	10
Strick	2017	4
Yung Kayo	2020	3
Bslime	2022	2
1300Saint	2025	2
diamond*	2025	2
Tezzus	2025	2
Iyrus	2026	0
Biggs money	2026	0
YUME	2026	0
Oruam	2026	0

=== Former ===
Act	Years on the label	Releases (under the label)
Lil Baby	2016	-
Gunna	2017—2025	12
Lil Keed (deceased)	2018—2022	7
Nine Vicious	2025	-
Yak Gotti	2015—2024	-
Lil Duke	2015—2024	-
FN DaDealer	2020—2024	-
YTB Trench	2020—2024	-

== Discography ==
=== Compilation albums ===
Studio album, with selected details
Title	Details	Peak chart positions					
Title	Details	US	US R&B/HH	US Rap	CAN	BEL (FL)	NLD
Slime Language (with Young Thug)	Released: August 17, 2018; Label: YSL, 300; Format: Digital download, streaming, CD, LP	8	—	—	11	111	46
Slime Language 2 (with Young Thug and Gunna)	Released: April 16, 2021; Label: YSL, 300; Format: Digital download, streaming, CD, LP	1	1	1	2	19	6
My Struggle (with Unfoonk)	Released: June 18, 2021; Label: YSL, 300; Format: Digital download, streaming, CD, LP	—	—	—	—	—	—
Big Deal (with FN DaDealer)	Released: July 14, 2021; Label: YSL, 300; Format: Digital download, streaming, CD, LP	—	—	—	—	—	—
Duke Hefner (with Lil Duke)	Released: July 23, 2021; Label: YSL, 300; Format: Digital download, streaming, CD, LP	—	—	—	—	—	—
Versatalien (with YTB Trench)	Released: July 30, 2021; Label: YSL, 300; Format: Digital download, streaming, CD, LP	—	—	—	—	—	—
Confetti Nights (with T-Shyne)	Released: April 1, 2022; Label: YSL, 300; Format: Digital download, streaming, CD, LP	—	—	—	—	—	—
Slime Language 3 (with Young Thug)	Released: August 28, 2026; Label: YSL, Create; Format: Digital download, streaming, CD, LP	146	47	—	—	—	—

=== Singles ===
==== As lead artist ====
List of singles as lead artist, with selected chart positions, showing year released and album name
Title	Year	Peak chart positions			Certifications	Album
Title	Year	US Bub.	US R&B/HH	NZ Hot	Certifications	Album
"Take It to Trial" (with Young Thug and Gunna featuring Yak Gotti)	2020	2	33	18		Slime Language 2
"GFU" (with Yak Gotti and Sheck Wes featuring Yung Kayo)	2021	—	—	—		Slime Language 2
"That Go!" (with Young Thug and Meek Mill featuring T-Shyne)	2021	9	43	—	RIAA: Gold	Slime Language 2
"Bstroy Socks" (with Yung Kayo)	2021	—	—	—		Non-album single
"Temperature" (with Unfoonk)	2021	—	—	—		My Struggle
"Cha Cha Slide" (with Yak Gotti)	2021	—	—	—		Non-album singles
"Sheesh" (with Karlae)	2021	—	—	—		Non-album singles
"Temperature" (with Unfoonk)	2021	—	—	—		My Struggle
"30 for 30" (with T-Shyne)	2021	—	—	—		TBA
"Messed Up" (with Fase Yoda)	2021	—	—	—		Non-album singles
"Silent" (with Unfoonk featuring Blac Youngsta)	—	—	—			Non-album singles
"Feed the Fam" (with T-Shyne)	2022	—	—	—		Confetti Nights
"Opp Top" (with Bslime)	2022	—	—	—		Non-album singles
"Blind" (with Karlae featuring Lil Yachty)	2022	—	—	—		Non-album singles
"Because of You" (with Fase Yoda)	2022	—	—	—		Non-album singles
"Separation" (with Bslime)	2022	—	—	—		Non-album singles
"Did That" (with Karlae)	2022	—	—	—		Non-album singles
"DEA" (with Unfoonk)	2022	—	—	—		Non-album singles
"—" denotes a recording that did not chart or was not released in that territory.						

==== As featured artist ====
List of singles as featured artist
Title	Year	Album
"Baguettes" (DJ Mlg featuring YSL Records)	2019	Non-album singles
"Not One of Us" (NobleBrendan featuring YSL Records)	2021	Non-album singles

=== Other charted and certified songs ===
List of songs, with selected chart positions, showing year released and album name
Title	Year	Peak chart positions							Certifications	Album
Title	Year	US	US R&B/HH	US R&B/HH	CAN	NZ Hot	UK	WW	Certifications	Album
"Slatty" (with Young Thug and Gunna featuring Yak Gotti and Lil Duke)	2021	99	39	—	—	—	—	154		Slime Language 2
"Ski" (with Young Thug and Gunna)	2021	18	11	9	33	6	72	23	RIAA: Gold	Slime Language 2
"Diamonds Dancing" (with Young Thug and Gunna featuring Travis Scott)	2021	46	21	16	39	5	80	35		Slime Language 2
"Solid" (with Young Thug and Gunna featuring Drake)	2021	12	6	4	8	1	36	11	RIAA: Gold; RMNZ: Gold	Slime Language 2
"Came and Saw" (with Young Thug featuring Rowdy Rebel)	2021	66	29	23	76	—	—	87		Slime Language 2
"Paid the Fine" (with Young Thug and Gunna featuring Lil Baby and YTB Trench)	2021	77	32	—	93	—	—	104		Slime Language 2
"Proud of You" (with Young Thug and Gunna featuring Lil Uzi Vert and Yung Kayo)	2021	59	27	21	57	9	—	65		Slime Language 2
"Real" (with Young Thug featuring Unfoonk)	2021	— (Note: "Real" did not enter the Billboard Hot 100, but peaked at number eight on the Bubbling Under Hot 100 chart.)	47	—	—	—	—	—		Slime Language 2
"Litty" (with Young Thug featuring DaBaby)	2021	— (Note: "Litty" did not enter the Billboard Hot 100, but peaked at number 25 on the Bubbling Under Hot 100 chart.)	—	—	—	32	—	—		Slime Language 2
"—" denotes a recording that did not chart or was not released in that territory.

=== Artist releases ===
==== Studio albums ====
Year	Album details	Details
2019	Gunna – Drip or Drown 2: Released: February 22, 2019; Label: YSL Records; Formats: digital download	Chart position: No. 2 U.S.; RIAA Certificate: Gold
2019	Lil Keed – Long Live Mexico: Released: June 14, 2019; Label: YSL Records, 300 Entertainment; Formats: digital download	Chart position: No. 26 U.S.
2019	Young Thug – So Much Fun: Released: August 16, 2019; December 20, 2019 (deluxe); Label: YSL Records; Formats: digital download	Chart position: No. 1 U.S.; RIAA Certificate: Platinum
2020	Gunna – Wunna: Released: May 22, 2020; Label: YSL Records; Formats: digital download	Chart position: No. 1 U.S.; RIAA Certificate: Gold
2020	Lil Keed – Trapped on Cleveland 3: Released: August 7, 2020; Label: YSL Records; Formats: digital download, streaming	Chart position: No. 41 U.S
2021	Young Thug – Punk: Released: October 15, 2021; Label: YSL Records; Formats: digital download	Chart position: No. 1 U.S.
2022	Gunna – DS4Ever: Released: January 7, 2022; Label: YSL Records, 300 Entertainment; Formats: digital download, streaming	Chart position: No. 1 U.S.
2022	Yung Kayo – DFTK: Released: February 4, 2022; Label: YSL Records; Formats: digital download, streaming	Chart position: uncharted
2023	Lil Keed – Keed Talk to 'Em 2: Released: March 17, 2023; Label: YSL Records, 300 Entertainment; Formats: digital download, streaming	Chart position: uncharted
2023	Gunna – A Gift & a Curse: Released: June 16, 2023; Label: YSL Records, 300 Entertainment; Formats: digital download, streaming	Chart position: No. 3 U.S.
2023	Young Thug – Business Is Business: Released: June 23, 2023; Label: YSL Records, 300 Entertainment; Formats: digital download, streaming	Chart position: No. 2 U.S.
2025	1300SAINT – Savior: Released: Nov 21, 2025; Label: YSL Records; Formats: digital download, streaming	Chart position: uncharted

==== Extended plays ====
Year	Album details
2019	Strick – See You When I Land: Released: January 19, 2019; Label: YSL Records; Formats: digital download, streaming

==== Compilation albums ====
Year	Album details	Details
2018	Young Thug (with YSL Records) – Slime Language: Released: August 17, 2018; Label: YSL Records; Formats: digital download	Chart position: No. 8 U.S.
2019	Strick – The Machine, Vol. 1: Released: June 28, 2019; Label: YSL Records; Formats: digital download, streaming	Chart position: uncharted
2019	Strick – The Machine, Vol. 2: Released: October 31, 2019; Label: YSL Records; Formats: digital download, streaming	Chart position: uncharted
2021	Young Thug and Gunna (with YSL Records) – Slime Language 2: Released: April 16, 2021; Label: YSL Records, 300; Formats: CD, LP, Cassette, Digital download, streaming	Chart position: No. 1 U.S.

==== Mixtapes ====
Year	Artist – Album	Details
2016	Gunna – Drip Season	Released: October 25, 2016; Label: YSL Records, 300 Entertainment; Formats: digital download, streaming
2017	Gunna – Drip Season 2	Released: May 11, 2017; Label: YSL Records, 300 Entertainment; Formats: digital download, streaming
2017	Gunna – Drip or Drown	Released: November 30, 2017; Label: YSL Records, 300 Entertainment; Formats: digital download, streaming
2018	Gunna – Drip Season 3	Released: February 2, 2018; Label: YSL Records, 300 Entertainment; Formats: digital download, streaming; Chart position: No. 55 U.S.
2018	Gunna (with Lil Baby) – Drip Harder	Released: October 4, 2018; Label: Quality Control, YSL Records, 300 Entertainment, Motown, Capitol; Formats: digital download, streaming; Chart position: No. 4 U.S.; RIAA Certificate: Platinum
2020	Lil Keed (with Zaytoven, Lil Gotit, & Lil Yachty) – A-Team	Released: February 28, 2020; Label: YSL Records, 300 Entertainment, Quality Control, Alamo Records; Formats: digital download, streaming
2020	Young Thug (with Chris Brown) – Slime & B	Released: May 5, 2020; Label: CBE, YSL Records, 300 Entertainment, RCA; Formats: digital download, streaming; Chart position: No. 24 U.S.
2025	Tezzus (with Diamond*) – UY SCUTI BØYZ	Released: April 17, 2026; Label: YSL Records; Formats: digital download, streaming
