= List of internet rap collectives =

The following is a list of internet rap collectives. Internet rap is a style of hip-hop that emerged in the late 2000s to early 2020s.

== Collectives ==
=== 1c34 ===
1c34 is an American hip-hop collective based in New York City formed by Xaviersobased, Glost, and Cranes in 2021. The group originally emerged as a gaming clan and involved members from around the world. 1c34 have been credited with pioneering the jerk microgenre and as influential in the 2020s underground rap scene. Notable members include St47ic, Ksuuvi, and Ss3bby. Notable former members include Bleood, Phreshboyswag, Zayguapkid, and Tenkay.

=== 2016lyfe ===
2016lyfe (also stylized as 2016LYFE) is an American cloud rap collective formed in 2025 by Smokedope2016, and includes producers Bartesianwater and Lil Fitted Cap, as well as rapper Ghostfacekush (formerly Cxupsean). The group's main focus is bringing back the cloud rap genre, pioneered in the early- and mid-2010s by artists such as Yung Lean, Black Kray and Clams Casino, from who they take inspiration.

=== ASAP Mob ===
ASAP Mob (stylized as A$AP Mob) is an American hip-hop collective formed in 2006 in Harlem, New York City, that consists of rappers (most of whom carry the "ASAP" moniker, except Dash and Playboi Carti), record producers, music video directors, and fashion designers.

=== Dark World ===
Dark World is an independent record label and music collective formed in 2010 in Massachusetts by rapper DJ Lucas. The label has released material by artists such as Lucy (Cooper B. Handy), Gods Wisdom, Ghost, Morimoto, Jumpy, and others.

=== DRACO.FM ===
DRACO.FM was a production collective who have collaborated with artists like OsamaSon, Ken Carson, Nettspend, Che, and Bladee. On July 10th, 2026, Skai told content creator halftime_fm that the collective had disbanded and is now on their own solo careers, with some of the members "aren't cool w each other no more". Skai also added that the collective was mainly together during the Flex Musix production.

=== Drain Gang ===
Drain Gang (formerly known as Gravity Boys, Shield Gang, GTBSG) is a Swedish hip-hop collective formed in 2013, consisting of the rappers Bladee, Ecco2k, and Thaiboy Digital, and the producer Whitearmor.

=== GothAngelz ===
GothAngelz is an American music collective formed in 2022 by musicians Wifiskeleton, Keepsecrets, Witchbox and Mandy. The group is known for pioneering the SoundCloud indie movement.

=== GothBoiClique ===
GothBoiClique (also abbreviated as GBC) is an American emo rap collective based in Los Angeles. It was formed in 2013 by Wicca Phase Springs Eternal, Cold Hart, Ghoste and Horse Head. The group's name comes from a beat that Cold Hart sent to Wicca Phase Springs Eternal. In 2016, the group released their first mixtape,Yeah It's True.

=== Goth Money ===
Goth Money, also known as Goth Money Records, is an American hip-hop collective and record label. It was founded by Black Kray and Marcy Mane in 2013.

=== Haunted Mound ===
Haunted Mound is an underground hip-hop collective formed by American rappers Sematary and Ghost Mountain. The group formed a record label of the same name, later adding more members like Hackle, Grimoire, Gonerville, JJ Valhalla, Turnabout, Welsh producer Snuffer, Anvil and the Irish producer Oscar18, having met him through social media after Steckler made posts showing interests to expand the Mound.

=== Helix Tears ===
Helix Tears is an American-Canadian digicore collective formed in 2018 by Blackwinterwells. Notable members include Blackwinterwells, Twikipedia, Babs, 8485, Quinn, Quannnic, Kuru, Vxvxxn Rxsx and Midwxst.

=== Hexcastcrew ===
Hexcastcrew is an American music collective formed in 2018 by Stacy Minajj (Cargoboym/tomoe_theundying), Dawsru and Dior5star. They have been credited with coining and popularizing the hexD microgenre.

=== Jewelxxet ===
Jewelxxet (stylized in uppercase) was an internet rap collective formed by rappers Luci4 and Islurwhenitalk. The group is most known for pioneering the microgenre sigilkore. Several notable artists later joined the group such as 2shanez, Sellasouls, MajinBlxxdy, Bacleo, Xaviersobased and St47ic.

=== Members Only ===
Members Only is an American hip-hop collective founded in 2014 by American rappers XXXTentacion and Ski Mask the Slump God. The group is based in Broward County, Florida. Following the release of their fourth project, Members Only, Vol. 4, in 2019, the collective has gone on an indefinite hiatus.

=== Novagang ===
Novagang (stylized in uppercase) is an American hip-hop collective formed in 2018 by rapper and record producer Prblm. The group's name was a portmanteau between his alias "Nova" and "gang".

=== Odd Future ===
Odd Future Wolf Gang Kill Them All, simply known as Odd Future and abbreviated as OF or OFWGKTA, was an American alternative hip-hop collective formed in Los Angeles in 2007. The group consisted of rappers, producers, filmmakers, skateboarders, actors, and clothing designers. The original members were Tyler, the Creator, Casey Veggies, Hodgy, Left Brain, Matt Martians, Jasper Dolphin, Travis "Taco" Bennett, and Syd. Later members included Brandun DeShay, Pyramid Vritra, Domo Genesis, Mike G, Earl Sweatshirt, L-Boy, Frank Ocean, and Na-Kel Smith.

=== Odd Squad ===
Odd Squad (stylized as odd squad) is/was an American hip-hop collective formed by rapper and producer Boolymon. Little is known about this collective apart from its members which include 19thou, 1i1an1, 20mop, Boolymon, Dbglokk, Jugnino, Kashmustdie, KRBY, lilodmv, Perubaby, Skellyshiest, Tali, Twovrt, Tyr9ll, Uunitzz, Wise and Unin.

=== ØWay ===
ØWay (stylized as ØWAY, also known as Phonk Dollaworldwide, stylized as Phønk Døllaworldwide) is an American hip-hop collective. An evolved version of 4ET, the group consists of a wide variety of artists such as 10KDunkin, Percaso, Lil Righteous, ShawtyRokk, Diamond*, Southsidesillhouette, Reezy X, Lilkixkdor, Billi0n, Ea Tj, Yung Fazo, Tezzus, Pz', and Sk8star. Olivier Lafontant of Pitchfork wrote how the "chameleonic, Auto-Tuned sex-symbol rap of 2010s YSL" lives on within the collective. Affiliates of the collective include Rollin Thrax and Diorvsyou, who work closely with members of the collective.

=== Raider Klan ===
Raider Klan (stylized as RVIDXR KLVN) was an American hip-hop collective formed in the Carol City neighborhood of Miami Gardens, in 2008. Raider Klan originally included rappers SpaceGhostPurrp, Dough Dough Da Don, Kadafi, Muney Junior, and Jitt, before expanding to include Denzel Curry, Chris Travis, Xavier Wulf, and others.

=== Reptilian Club Boyz ===
Reptilian Club Boyz was an American internet rap collective based in Tennessee. Formed by rappers Hi-C and Diamondsonmydick in 2016, they have been credited as influential in the 2020s underground rap scene and development of the hexD genre.

=== Shadow Wizard Money Gang ===
Shadow Wizard Money Gang is a music collective featuring producer DJ Smokey. The collective garnered traction online due to their producer tags.

=== Shed Theory ===
Shed Theory is an internet rap collective formed in 2021. According to Pitchfork, the group is "an all-white crew of plugg droners who spawn 'nod pits' at their shows and pal around with questionable figures like comedian Sam Hyde." Notable members include musician Tek Lintowe who was formerly of the group.

=== SlayWorld ===
SlayWorld was a hip-hop collective of artists and producers featuring artists such as Summrs, Autumn!, Yeat, Kankan, SSGKobe, Izaya Tiji, GOONIE, Frankslastday, Véne, Alexzander Pray, Brent Rambo and Endoh. The group is known for pioneering a modern form of ambient trap, later seen used by artists such as iayze!, Babysantana, and more.

=== Slime Krew ===
Slime Krew (also known as TDF & Friends, stylized tdf & friends in lowercase, and The New Slayworld) is the unofficial name for a group of artists and producers who have collaborated frequently with one another. The group is known for popularizing the dark plugg and terror plugg sounds within the 2020s underground rap scene. Members include OsamaSon, 1oneam, Ohsxnta, Okaymar, Wildkarduno, Smokingskul, TDF, Perc40, and Boolymon. Affiliated acts include Thr33, Elijxhwtf, Luracks, 19thou, Twovrt, Thrty, and Marrgielaa.

=== StepTeam ===
StepTeam (stylized as #stepTeam or sstepteam) is an internet rap and plugg production collective consisting of producers Ivvys, Maajins and Sxprano. The group pioneered an "off-kilter" and glitchy production style. Alphonse Pierre of Pitchfork wrote how the trio "has pioneered a glitchy, intricate beatmaking style that takes a hacksaw to the standard patterns of rap percussion." Xang's collective DPM (Deep and Powerful Music) was also considered to be a inspiration for StepTeam's production style.

=== Surf Gang ===
Surf Gang is an American hip-hop collective and netlabel founded in New York City in 2018 by Evilgiane, Eera and Harrison. They have been cited as influential to the contemporary underground rap scene.

=== SwaggerBoyz ===
SwaggerBoyz is an Argentine hip-hop collective formed by rappers AgusFortnite2008 and Stiffy in 2020. The pair had met prior online on Minecraft and grew up in the neighbourhood of Merlo, Buenos Aires.

=== Thraxxhouse ===
Thraxxhouse was a hip hop collective formed in 2014 as a Seattle offshoot of Florida's Raider Klan collective. It was started by rappers Mackned and Key Nyata, who took its name from Lil B's 2009 mixtape I'm Thraxx and the genre of witch house. Additional members of the collective included Horse Head, Lil Tracy, Cold Hart, Nedarb, AJ Suede, Fish Narc and SneakGuapo. In mid-2015, founder Key Nyata left the group, and by the end of the year, the group had dissolved due to the increasing trouble in administering the group's large number of members.

=== TooManyStrikers ===
TooManyStrikers, or TMS is a DMV-based free car music and hip-hop collective. Formed by creative director and music producer SJR, members of the group include Kuru, SlimeGetEm, Jaeychino, Dragnutz, ST6 Jodyboof, Tovi, and Killjae. The collective is known for its diverse range of musical styles, which range from free car music (also known as DMV Drill), to hyperpop and digicore. Xaviersobased is an affiliate of the collective.

=== #Twilight ===
#Twilight was an American internet rap collective formed in 2019 by artists Kynlary, Chaosysl, Slidetomycrib, and Osei. The group is credited with pioneering the diary microgenre. The group dissolved by August 2024, after which most of the group's music was removed from streaming services. The group was heavily inspired by The Twilight Saga and frequently referenced the love triangle between the series' characters Edward Cullen, Bella Swan, and Jacob Black as allegories for their recurring themes of love and heartbreak. The group described its sound as "ambient, sad, emotional, depressing" and their lyrics often address themes of suicide, self-harm, and betrayal. Notable members include Kynlary, Chaosysl, Slidetomycrib, Braxton Knight, D0llywood1, Osei, Elanidivine, Glosuka, and Tenkay.

=== WitchGang ===
WitchGang is an American internet rap collective formed by rapper St47ic who coined the microgenre 2k13 Hood EDM. The group has been described by British magazine I-D as an "anarchic collective" which featured rappers such as P6nk.

== See also ==
- Musical collective
