= DJ Smokey =

Canadian music producer

- Born: May 30, 1992 (age 34)
- Origin: Ontario, Canada
- Genres: Phonk; cloud rap; rare phonk; trap; EDM
- Occupation: Producer
- Instrument: FL Studio
- Years active: 2011–present
- Member of: Shadow Wizard Money Gang
- Formerly of: Positive Squad
- Website: djsmokey.bandcamp.com

DJ Smokey (born May 30, 1992), is a pseudonymous music producer based in Montreal, Canada. He is best known for his involvement with cloud rap and the development of the phonk genre, including collaborations with ASAP Mob, Yung Lean, Yung Simmie, and Lil Peep.

In 2025, he hosted the Skrillex album Fuck U Skrillex You Think Ur Andy Warhol but Ur Not!!, while his producer tags grew attention online. He is a member of the Shadow Wizard Money Gang music collective.

== Career ==
=== Early career and hiatus (2011–2018) ===
DJ Smokey was raised in Ontario, Canada and received classical piano training in his youth. Inspired by Soulja Boy's use of FL Studio in his productions, he switched his focus from piano to producing in the software in high school. His early work, beginning in 2011 on SoundCloud and YouTube, was inspired by phonk and Memphis rap production, especially SpaceGhostPurrp and Lil Ugly Mane, sampling 90s Memphis rappers like Playa Fly and Kingpin Skinny Pimp.

His Memphis rap and phonk-inspired mixtape, Evil Wayz, published in 2013, was referred to by Bandcamp Daily as a "cult classic" and "one of the best albums of the 'cloud rap' era." In particular, they mentioned the song "Evil Wayz Intro" as "the track that introduced him to the world."

His involvement on SoundCloud, especially with Evil Wayz, led to his first collaborations with the rap collective Raider Klan, facilitated by direct-messaging rappers on the platform. DJ Smokey credited these early collaborations as a contributing factor to producing for other established rappers like Yung Lean.

Several publications have described his early releases as influential within phonk, with comparisons to Lil Ugly Mane. Dazed noted that his early work "played an often overlooked role in the early careers of Yung Lean and Lil Peep."

In a 2025 interview with the online music magazine Sabukaru, DJ Smokey named his 2014 mixtape Smoked Out Dance Party as a turning point away from melancholic phonk-influenced production and towards what he described as more "positive" beats, attributing the more melancholic production in earlier releases as a reflection of ongoing drug abuse issues. He formed the Positive Squad music collective with KirbLaGoop, Smokeasac and Ruben Slik the following year in 2015. After participating in a drug rehabilitation program in 2018, he took two years away from music. He later described his recovery from drug addiction as a primary influence on his subsequent mixtapes and collaborations.

=== Return and online virality (2020–present) ===
In 2022, DJ Smokey's producer tags, described by The Needle Drop as "very gravely voiced announcements . . . some of which [are] deeply ridiculous" became viral online. Influenced by collaborator Shaq France, he created the "Nuke" imprint used in his album art and producer tags. The satirical Trapaholics-influenced tags — for example, "legalize nuclear bombs" and "call the fire department, we just nuked the building" — were popularized and parodied in memes.

In addition, the "Shadow Wizard Money Gang" producer tag, originally made by fellow Shadow Wizard Money Gang member Louka Tessier, was popularized by DJ Smokey initially in its use on the song "Gout" by Joeyy. The tag's viral spread on TikTok brought DJ Smokey wider online attention, and provoked fan-created merchandise and lore that sometimes developed independently of the Shadow Wizards and DJ Smokey himself.

Following DJ Smokey's rise in online popularity, collaborator Varg2™ introduced Skrillex to DJ Smokey. This led to him and Skrillex meeting in Los Angeles and collaborating, culminating in DJ Smokey hosting his 2025 album Fuck U Skrillex You Think Ur Andy Warhol but Ur Not!! <3. His contributions to the album received positive coverage in Rolling Stone, The Needle Drop and Dazed.

== Discography ==
=== Mixtapes ===
List of mixtapes
Title	Details
Purple Diamondz Vol. 1	Released: October 1, 2012; Label: Self-released; Format: Digital download, streaming
Da Smoke Tape	Released: November 16, 2012; Label: Self-released; Format: Digital download, streaming
Land of Da Phonk (with Mr. Sisco)	Released: December 17, 2012; Label: Self-released; Format: Digital download, streaming
Evil Wayz	Released: March 1, 2013, December 10, 2024 (re-release); Label: Self-released, Bratty Dog Tapes (re-release); Format: Digital download, streaming, vinyl record (re-release)
Kush Alienz	Released: July 19, 2013; Label: Self-released; Format: Digital download, streaming
Codeine Demonz	Released: July 19, 2013; Label: Self-released; Format: Digital download, streaming
Evil Wayz Vol. 2	Released: September 27, 2013, December 10, 2024 (re-release); Label: Self-released, Bratty Dog Tapes (re-release); Format: Digital download, streaming, vinyl record (re-release)
Mystic Wayz	Released: November 22, 2013; Label: Self-released; Format: Digital download, streaming
Land of Da Phonk Vol. 2 (with Kraft Dinna)	Released: June 16, 2014; Label: Self-released; Format: Digital download, streaming
Smoked Out Dance Party	Released: September 8, 2014; Label: Self-released; Format: Digital download, streaming
Choppin Out Da Forest	Released: March 11, 2015; Label: Self-released; Format: Digital download, streaming
Evil Wayz Vol. 3	Released: October 20, 2015, December 10, 2024 (re-release); Label: Self-released, Bratty Dog Tapes (re-release); Format: Digital download, streaming, vinyl record (re-release)
Codeine Demonz Vol. 2	Released: July 21, 2016; Label: Self-released; Format: Digital download, streaming
Positive Squad The Soundtrack Vol. 1	Released: June 15, 2017; Label: Positive Squad Records; Format: Digital download, streaming
Positive Squad Adventures Chapter 1	Released: July 10, 2017; Label: Positive Squad Records; Format: Digital download, streaming
Positive Squad Adventures Chapter 2	Released: September 10, 2017; Label: Positive Squad Records; Format: Digital download, streaming
Yoshi Emeraldz	Released: September 30, 2017; Label: Positive Squad Records; Format: Digital download, streaming
Kirby Rubiez	Released: October 19, 2017; Label: Positive Squad Records; Format: Digital download, streaming
Goony Toonz (with Ruben Slikk)	Released: June 8, 2018, August 18, 2023 (re-release); Label: Positive Squad Records, Circle 5 Records (re-release); Format: Digital download, streaming, cassette tape (re-release)
Adventures In Nightmare Land	Released: August 31, 2018; Label: Positive Squad Records; Format: Digital download, streaming
Squirtle Sapphires	Released: October 4, 2018; Label: Self-released; Format: Digital download, streaming
Only 2 Left Alive (with Soudiere)	Released: August 24, 2020; Label: Purple Posse; Format: Digital download, streaming, vinyl record
Nuked Out Dance Party	Released: May 30, 2023; Label: Self-released; Format: Digital download, streaming
LORESEEKER with BBY Goyard	Released: July 28, 2023; Label: Olympus Projects, self-released; Format: Digital download, streaming
COWBOYS WITH NUKES	Released: October 9, 2023; Label: Self-released; Format: Digital download, streaming
Poison Pack #1	Released: July 9, 2024; Label: Self-released; Format: Digital download, streaming
Psychological Musical Warfare (with Varg2™)	Released: November 8, 2024; Label: Self-released; Format: Digital download, streaming
HUMILIATION RITUAL (with Shadow Wizard Money Gang)	Released: December 6, 2024; Label: Self-released; Format: Digital download, streaming
Psychological Musical Warfare Vol. 2 (with Varg2™)	Released: May 16, 2025; Label: Self-released; Format: Digital download, streaming
Nuclear Summer 2K25 (with Soudiere, Max2k10)	Released: August 1, 2025; Label: Nuke Radio, Evil Poison Inc.; Format: Digital download, streaming
Nuclear Fall: Atomic Autumn (with Soudiere)	Released: October 26, 2025; Label: Self-released; Format: Digital download, streaming
School Of Trap (with DJ Foreign Money)	Released: Jan 16, 2026; Label: Self-released, Bratty Dog Tapes; Format: Digital download, streaming, CD-R
Nuclear Winter: BurrBerry Blizzard (with Shaq France)	Released: February 28, 2026; Label: Self-released, Bratty Dog Tapes; Format: Digital download, streaming, CD
Nuclear Spring: Nuke World Order	Released: May 14, 2026; Label: Self-released; Format: Digital download, streaming

=== Compilations ===
List of compilations
Title	Album details
Traphouse Of Horrors Chapter 1, 2 & 3	Released: August 7, 2018; Label: Positive Squad Records; Format: Digital download, streaming
Lost And Found	Released: November 11, 2021; Label: Self-released; Format: Digital download, streaming

=== Hosted ===
Selected list of releases hosted
Title	Details	Artist
Gout	Released: December 2, 2022; Label: Self-released; Format: Digital download, streaming; Type: Single	Joeyy
YEAR 2023 AD: NUKES ARE NOW LEGAL	Released: January 19, 2023; Label: Self-released; Format: Digital download, streaming; Type: Album	Christ Dillinger
There's Evil in This Club	Released: June 13, 2024; Label: Self-released; Format: Digital download, streaming; Type: Album	Christ Dillinger, Seepy
Fuck U Skrillex You Think Ur Andy Warhol but Ur Not	Released: April 1, 2025; Label: Atlantic, Owsla; Format: Digital download, streaming, vinyl record; Type: Album	Skrillex

== Selected production discography ==
Selected list of releases produced
Title	Details	Artist(s)
Stayin True	Released: August 10, 2012; Label: RBC Records; Format: Digital download, streaming; Type: Song (on album/mixtape)	Chris Travis
3D Spaceship	Released: May 18, 2013; Label: Self-released; Format: Digital download, streaming; Type: Single	Yung Lean
Shut Up and Vibe	Released: July 16, 2013; Label: Self-released; Format: Digital download, streaming; Type: Album	Yung Simmie
Iced Out Castles (Note: Originally released independently on July 19, 2013 as part of DJ Smokey's "Kush Alienz" mixtape, then re-released by Goth Money Records as part of Black Kray's "Ice Cream & Mac 10s" mixtape on August 2, 2013)	Released: July 19, 2013; Label: Self-released, Goth Money Records; Format: Digital download, streaming; Type: Song (on album/mixtape)	Black Kray
900 Thouxan	Released: August 17, 2016; Label: Self-released; Format: Digital download, streaming; Type: Mixtape	Chxpo, KirbLagoop
Fuck Fame	Released: October 11, 2016; Label: Self-released; Format: Digital download, streaming; Type: Single	Lil Peep, Lil Tracy
Young Nigga Living	Released: October 31, 2016; Label: A$AP, Polo Grounds, RCA; Format: Digital download, streaming; Type: Song (on album/mixtape)	A$AP Mob
Freaky (co-produced with Chase Davis and SuicideBoys)	Released: September 9, 2017; Label: Taylor Gang; Format: Digital download, streaming; Type: Song (on album/mixtape)	Juicy J
4THWALL PT. 2	Released: March 3, 2023; Label: Olympus Projects; Format: Digital download, streaming; Type: Album	BBY Goyard
Murio La Musica	Released: March 15, 2025; Label: Dale Play Records, SWAGGERBOYZ; Format: Digital download, streaming; Type: Album	AgusFortnite2008, Stiffy
