= Ivvys =

American rapper (born 2006)

- Also known as: Vv1; H4!; H4blackasf; Ivvys1
- Born: Linzell Newton; November 3, 2006 (age 19); Bridgeport, Connecticut
- Genres: Plugg; trap
- Occupations: Rapper; record producer; songwriter; engineer
- Years active: 2014-present
- Member of: StepTeam

Linzell Newton (born November 3, 2006), known professionally as Ivvys (stylized in lowercase), is an American-Nigerian record producer, rapper, and music engineer from Bridgeport, Connecticut.

Serving as one of the main members of the producer collective StepTeam, Newton is known for his collaborations with Ken Carson, Yuke, Mike, Bleood, and Lucy Bedroque, among other artists.

== Early life ==
Newton was born on November 3, 2006, in Bridgeport, Connecticut.

== Career ==
=== Early career ===
Newton first began making music when he was eight years old. He has said that he was inspired by his father, who at the time was making Chief Keef type beats on FL Studios. He told his father that he wanted to learn how to produce; as he got older, around the age 14 or 15, he started working on tracks together with his father. Around this time, he also discovered underground rap through SoundCloud.

Sometime in 2023 or 2024, Newton began experimenting with his sound and started working on his own flow. He stated that he used to make ambient plugg type beats using the Timeless 3 delay plugin. He would also listen to many artists who fell under that genre, such as Izaya Tiji, Theo, Xang, and an earlier version of Ian. Despite receiving backlash for learning their flow, Newton still went with it and learned how to make it his own.

=== StepTeam ===
During his career, Newton, alongside Maajins and Sxprano helped create StepTeam, an Internet rap and plugg production collective. The group pioneered an "off-kilter" and glitchy production style. Alphonse Pierre of Pitchfork wrote how the trio "has pioneered a glitchy, intricate beatmaking style that takes a hacksaw to the standard patterns of rap percussion." Xang's collective DPM (Deep and Powerful Music) helped inspire Ivvy's flow and StepTeam's production style.

== Musical style ==
Newton's music, according to Alphonse Pierre of Pitchfork, is considered to be one of the most "experimentally abrasive corners of Jersey club." Newton claimed that his music production is an amalgamation of ambient trap and EDM music. Pierre wrote how Newton's music is "off-balanced, brain-altering", and "Lunchbox-ish."

== Reception ==
Newton's music has generated positive reviews among media critics; his song "IG Reels" was ranked as one of the best new tracks by Pitchfork. His track "Madoka" was ranked at #8 on Pitchfork's Top 40 Best Rap Songs Of 2025.
