= Ghost Mountain (disambiguation) =

Ghost Mountain is a mountain in the Owen Stanley Ranges in the South East of Papua New Guinea, also known locally as Suwemalla.

Ghost Mountain may also refer to:

- Ghost Mountain (Chaba Icefield) in the Canadian Rockies
- Intaba Yemikhovu or Ghost Mountain, a mountain near Mkuze in KwaZulu-Natal, South Africa
- "Ghost Mountain", a 2003 song by the Unicorns from Who Will Cut Our Hair When We're Gone?
- Ghost Mountain, American rapper and Sematary affiliate
