= Kill Your Idols (album) =

Studio album by Bleood
- Released: October 30, 2026
- Genre: Rage
- Length: 36:25
- Label: Last Chapel
- Producers: Aquasocks; BenjiCold; Chxncex; Legion; Skai; Yrsci

Bleood chronology
Protagonist (2026)	Kill Your Idols (2026)

Kill Your Idols (stylized in all caps) is the third studio album by American rapper Bleood. It was released through Last Chapel on October 30, 2026. The album is a successor to the previous mixtape, Protagonist, which released on May 13, 2026. It features guest appearances from rappers Pz', Kllhhr, SlimeGetEm and FullyChop. Upon release, Kill Your Idols received a mixed reception from music journalists, with writers critiquing the album's harsh, noise-driven production.

== Background and release ==
Bleood initially emerged as an artist under the alias "M4ri", later becoming a member of New York City rapper Xaviersobased's collective 1c34 under the alias "Deffici1e". He later formed the group #back (also known as "Backphobic") with rapper Yuke. Upon his rise to fame, he released his first mixtape Pain in March, and Rascal 51 in October 2025. Anthony Fantano spoke on the project, writing how the project's aesthetic falls under the gore and rock category, which appeals to many of his listeners.

Upon release, Bleood continued to maintain his virality and followed through with his surprise released mixtape Protagonist, which was released on May 14, 2026. Following the release, Bleood began working on Kill Your Idols and starting building up momentum for the project. After multiple pushbacks and further single releases, Bleood officially released Kill Your Idols on October 30, 2026.

== Composition ==
Kill Your Idols contains a total of 17 tracks with features from Pz', Kllhhr, SlimeGetEm, and FullyChop, and features music production from Aquasocks, BenjiCold, Chxncex, Legion, Skai, and Yrsci. According to Fantano, he wrote that the delivery on the project is "softer" than his previous releases; it features "messy", "chaotic", and "half-hearted" auto-croon vocal passages. The album combines distorted bass, aggressive synthesizers, and melodic elements in its production.

== Critical reception ==
Alexander Cole of HotNewHipHop wrote that the album is a great example of a corner of underground rap known for harsh, noise-based production and heavy Auto-Tune, with yelling sprinkled in. Zeke Boyd of The Observer called it bleood's most experimental album, praising its frantic vocal delivery and distorted production. He called it one of his favorite albums of 2026, writing that it pushed hip-hop into rarely explored territory, while remaining enjoyable. In a less favorable review, Fantano spoke on the project, stating how "boring", "mind-numbing", and "forgettable" it is and that the project is a copy of a copy of former rage album releases and how it fails to show Bleood's growth and evolution as an artist.

== Track listing ==
All tracks are written by Jamari Spencer-Brown; additional writers are credited below.

Kill Your Idols track listing
No.	Title	Writer(s)	Producer(s)	Length
1.	"AW02 Angel Cry"		Chxncex	2:17
2.	"Bite Yoh Neck"	Ramy Tohamy	Chxncex; Yrsci	2:06
3.	"Flying Dutchman"		Chxncex	1:52
4.	"Lead Never Follow" (featuring Pz')	Papayusupha Goree Njie; Tohamy	Chxncex; Yrsci	2:04
5.	"She Loves Me I Hate Her"	Keifa Carter	Legion	2:17
6.	"Stupid B#@_h Ruined my Mood"	Jacob Reynolds	Aquasocks	1:35
7.	"I'm The King Dracula"		Chxncex	2:13
8.	"I'm a Rascal Surfer in an Ocean of Bleood"	Carter	Legion	1:14
9.	"Yu Broke Me Down I Built Myself Up"	Tohamy	Chxncex; Yrsci	2:27
10.	"Super Nova"		Chxncex	2:00
11.	"Peeley"	Johnny Peng	Skai	2:27
12.	"No New Frens" (featuring Kllhhr)	Reynolds	Aquasocks; Yrsci	1:52
13.	"Diablo May Weep"	James Addison	BenjiCold	2:34
14.	"2K Tip" (featuring SlimeGetEm and FullyChop)	Ja'Quan Wilson; Damyron Wales; Reynolds	Aquasocks	2:12
15.	"Shiro"	Tohamy	Yrsci	2:20
16.	"Kat Lazer Eye Chain"	Tohamy	Yrsci	2:30
17.	"Last"	Carter	Legion	2:17
Total length:				36:25

Notes

- All tracks are stylized in all lowercase except for "Lead Never Follow", "No New Frens" and "Kat Lazer Eye Chain" which are stylized in all caps.

== Personnel ==
Credits adapted from Apple Music and Tidal.

- Jamari "Bleood" Brown - recording engineer (all), mixing (2, 3, 4, 6, 7, 10, 11, 13, 14, 15, 16)
- Ja'Quan "SlimeGetEm" Wilson - recording (14)
- Jacob "Aquasocks" Reynolds - mixing (12)
- Chxncex - mixing (1, 8, 12, 17)
- Ramy "Yrsci" Tohamy- mixing (5, 9)

== Release history ==
Release dates and formats for Kill Your Idols
Region	Date	Format(s)	Label	Ref.
Worldwide	May 14, 2026	streaming; LP; CD	Last Chapel	
