= Weiland (musician) =

American rapper and singer (born 2000)

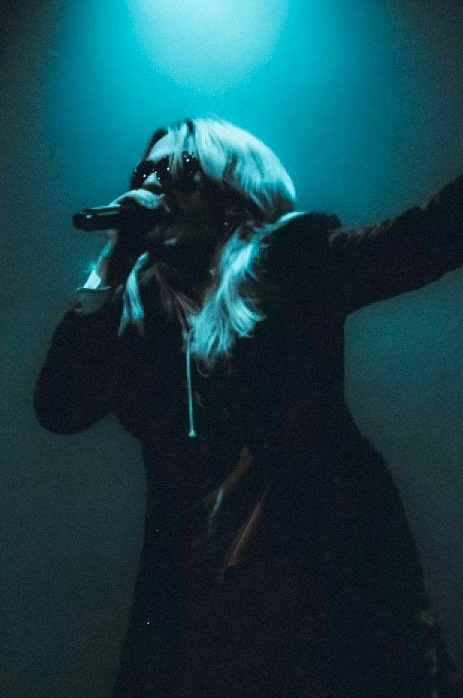
- Weiland performing in London, May 2025

Background information
- Also known as: Alleen Plains
- Born: Gavin Weiland; October 22, 2000 (age 26); Tampa, Florida, U.S.
- Genres: PluggnB; trap; alternative R&B; alternative pop
- Occupations: Rapper; singer; songwriter; audio engineer; record producer
- Instruments: Vocals; digital audio workstation; guitar; keyboard; synthesizers
- Years active: 2014–present
- Labels: Universal; Victor Victor; Pack Runner Records

Gavin Weiland Huff (born October 22, 2000), known professionally as Weiland, is an American rapper, singer, songwriter, and music producer from Tampa, Florida. Huff is currently signed to Steven Victor's Victor Victor label and is known for his studio albums Weiland and Vices released under the label. He is also known for providing American rapper and collaborator Yeat with his recording template.

== Career ==
=== 2016–2019: Beginnings: Packrunner and Grimey Youth ===
Huff began releasing music on the music platform SoundCloud in 2016. After the release of a number of songs on the platform, he recalls getting noticed by members of the rap collective Slayworld along with its associated producers. His rise to fame was accredited to publicity schemes such as a supposed Auto-Tune implant and misdemeanors involving rocket launchers.

In April 2018, he released his single "Who's Better" with American rapper and member of the Slayworld collective Summrs. In May 2018, he released his EP Grimey Youth.

Throughout these early years of his career, Huff would help play a pioneering role in the early development and shaping of the pluggnB subgenre in the underground rap scene. Alongside the Slayworld collective and formerly frequent collaborators such as Summrs, Autumn!, Kankan, and Izaya Tiji, he would assist in leading this deemed new wave of sound with the release of his two projects and substantial amount of singles with producer XanGang.

=== 2020: Victor Victor, Weiland ===
Huff signed to music executive Steven Victor's Victor Victor Worldwide record label in 2020, notable for being the label of notable musicians like drill rapper Pop Smoke and producer 808 Melo.

=== 2021–present: Vices and You Can't Climb The Mountain In N.Y. ===
In 2021, he grabbed the attention of record producer Mike Dean who helped him with the production of his second album Vices. In October 2021, he released his single "Heart Stop". In December 2021, he released a single titled "Blaming Myself" with Dean. In a February 2022 interview with Lyrical Lemonade, American musician KayCyy hinted at a collaboration between Weiland and American singer Toro y Moi for his upcoming album.

In April 2022, he released Vices through Universal Music Group and Victor Victor Worldwide. It debuted at number six on the Spotify "Top Albums Debut USA" chart. Later that year, he announced his upcoming third album American Pop, which has not yet been released.

In 2024 and 2025, he released two singles, an EP and an album under the alias Alleen Plains. In March 2025, he teased an EP titled You Can't Climb The Mountain in N.Y. which released on May 9, 2025. The EP features both Summrs and Part Time.

== Musical style ==
Weiland's earlier music was notable for his signature usage of vocal effects like reverb and Auto-Tune along with the unique style of plugg trap beats that he used. This style largely contained elements from genres such as trap rap, cloud rap, and plugg music.

In late 2020, he revealed he had transitioned from this older sound to a newer retro synthpop and coldwave-esque sound. Weiland unveiled this sound with the release of two singles in 2021 prior to his album, Vices. It is also noted that he drives inspiration from musicians such as Kanye West, Imogen Heap, and Daft Punk.

== Discography ==
(as Weiland)

=== Studio albums ===
List of albums, with selected details
Title	Album details
Weiland	Released: November 20, 2020; Label: UMG, Victor Victor; Format: Digital download, streaming
Vices	Released: April 22, 2022; Label: UMG, Victor Victor; Format: LP, Digital download, streaming

=== Mixtapes ===
List of mixtapes, with selected details
Title	Mixtape details
Packrunner	Released: September 13, 2017; Label: Self-released; Format: Digital download, streaming
Vices V1 (Demos & Rarities)	Released: August 7, 2026; Label: Feels Nice Records; Format: Digital download, Streaming

=== Extended plays ===
List of extended plays, with selected details
Title	Extended play details
Grimey Youth	Released: May 12, 2018; Label: Repost Network; Format: Digital download, streaming
You Can't Climb The Mountain in N.Y.	Released: May 9, 2025; Label: Victor Victor; Format: Digital download, streaming

=== Singles ===
- “Blue Bands” (2016)
- "No Reason" (2016)
- "Designer Drugs" (2016)
- "Green Dot" (2017)
- "Money Right" (2017)
- "Down 4 Me" (2017)
- "First Day Out" (2017)
- "All I Need" (2018)
- "Sold My Soul" (2018)
- "Wide Open" (2018)
- "Alone" (2018)
- "Colors" (2018)
- "Season" (2019)
- "2AM" (2019)
- "Count It Out" (2019)
- "Hellcat" (2020)
- "slilppnyhik6febe.onion" (2020)
- "Heart Stop" (2021)
- "Blaming Myself" (2021) (with Mike Dean)

(as Alleen Plains)

=== Studio albums ===
List of studio albums, with selected details
Title	studio album details
Opiate Sessions	Released: May 16, 2025; Label: Self-released; Format: Digital download, streaming, Cassette

=== Extended plays ===
List of extended plays, with selected details
Title	Extended play details
Fall From Grace	Released: July 11, 2025; Label: Self-released; Format: Digital download, streaming

=== Singles ===
- "Live Small Party Huge" (2024)
- "The Department" (2024)
