= Come and Go (disambiguation) =

Come and Go is a short play by Samuel Beckett.

Come and Go may also refer to:

- "Come & Go" (song), by Juice Wrld and Marshmello, 2020
- "Come & Go", a song by 50 Cent from Curtis (50 Cent album)
- "Come & Go", a song by ArrDee from Pier Pressure (mixtape)
- "Come & Go", a song by the Arcs from Yours, Dreamily,
- "Come n Go", a 2025 song by Yeat
- Kum & Go, a store chain
