= Percaso =

American rapper and singer (born 2008)

- Also known as: Perc; KK
- Born: September 22, 2008 (age 18); Italy
- Genres: Hip-hop; rage; trap
- Occupations: Rapper; singer; songwriter; producer
- Years active: 2022–present
- Member of: Ø Way

Percaso (born September 22, 2008) is an Italian-American recording artist and producer from Orlando, Florida, he's known for his affiliations with the Atlanta-based collective Ø Way. Percaso first rose to the scene with the release of his 2024 track "On Deck" which captivated the likes of Lil Yachty and the Concrete Boys.

== Early life ==
Percaso was born on September 22, 2008, in Italy, before he relocated to the Dominican Republic, where he spent most of his early childhood, before finally settling down in Orlando, Florida.

== Career ==
=== Early career and rise to fame: 2022-2024 ===
After relocating to Orlando, Percaso's interest in music began growing after observing the music scene in Florida in person and online through the Internet, where he would discover more music through online apps such as Discord. His first track was released in 2022 and featured the iconic "plugg" ad-lib. Following the start of his career, Percaso would release his debut EP Mhm and album 15 in 2023. Percaso would then begin generating online attention the following year in 2024 with the release of his February track "On Deck". Following the release, he would maintain a steady stream of releases such as "Evil Dreams" and "Glee's n P's" before captivating the attention of Lil Yachty and the Concrete Boys, where he would subsequently end up being a supporting cast member for them on their "It's Us" tour. Shortly after, Percaso would release his debut project of the year titled MGN, which stands for Money Getting Nigga. The project, like "On Deck", garnered attention online which would later captivate the attention of people such as PlaqueBoyMax.

=== Further releases: 2025-present ===
Entering 2025, Percaso would maintain his momentum after he was featured on the track "Sexual Fantasies" with Maxon Margiela. Which was labeled as one of the best rap songs of 2025 by Vivian Medithi of The Fader. In April 2025, Percaso released Fast Car Music, a 13-track project with features from Polo Youngin, Wizz Havinn, Reddglk, and Luh Tyler. Medithi described the project as a "brash burst of digitally-inflected bangers". Shortly after, in August, Percaso would collaborate with Tezzus to release their joint project Søufside, which would serve as his final release of the 2025 calendar year. On May 8, 2026, Percaso performed at Rolling Loud 2026 in Orlando, Florida. On November 13, 2026, Percaso was featured on Tezzus' EP Mømma Bøyz.

== Style and influences ==
Percaso is known for his "fierce" and energetic energy. his earlier projects took influence from jerk, Atlanta hip-hop, and the Florida hip-hop scene.

== Discography ==
Credits adapted from Apple Music.

=== Albums ===
Title	Details
Fast Car Music	Released: April 4, 2025; Label: Open Shift Distribution; Formats: Digital download

=== EPs ===
Title	Details
Mhm	Released: August 18, 2023; Label: Self-released; Format: Digital download, streaming
15	Released: December 8, 2023; Label: Self-released; Format: Digital download, streaming
Søufside (with Tezzus)	Released: August 1, 2025; Label: Open Shift Distribution; Format: Digital download, streaming
Pøsted Up In Paris	Released: September 4, 2026; Label: Open Shift Distribution; Format: Digital download, streaming
