= Go2Work =

2025 single by Yeat and Summrs

Song by Yeat & Summrs

from the album Lyfestyle
- Released: September 2, 2025
- Genre: Hip-hop; trap; rage
- Length: 3:23
- Label: Field Trip; Capitol; Lyfestyle Incorporation
- Songwriters: Noah Olivier Smith; Deante Adam Johnson
- Producers: Synthetic; venny

"Go2Work" (stylized in all caps) is a song by American rappers Yeat and Summrs from Yeat's fifth studio album, Lyfestyle (2024). Released under Capitol Records and Field Trip records, it was produced by Synthetic, Venny, Robin, and TC.

== Composition ==
Mike Mettler of Sound & Vision wrote that the track samples "percussion sizzle-taps that reside in the mid-quadrant quiver, quake, and hiss like they came off a well-played, long-warped LP—and that's a good thing". He also noted that the song is filled with "synth-burbling flashes and squeals" across the soundboard, praising its textured and dynamic production. Mettler further highlighted Yeat's vocal delivery, describing it as "warped and wavering" yet well-balanced with the percussive elements. He credited producers Robin, Synthetic, and TC for keeping the mix "smart and restrained", allowing the song's rhythm and flow to shine. Summrs' verse was described as adding "a different vocal flavor", with Mettler pointing out how his ad-libs and exclamations ("okay" and "whoa") shift across the stereo field to create spatial depth and movement in the track.

== Music video ==
Featuring visuals from Jack Rottier and Alex Edep, the accompanying visual sees the original collaborators cut between rapping together and working in a convenience store similar to that of a 7-Eleven. Before the video's release, the duo teased their work together using bench ads across Los Angeles and a 1-800-GO2-WORK "help line" for those who are "still broke" and "in need of a job".

== Critical response ==
"Go2Work" received positive responses from critics, with Quincy from Ratings Game Music writing how "GO2WORK captures the essence of mixtape music from the days when Gucci Mane was at the top". He also writes how "the song kicks off with a gritty trap beat that harkens back to that era. Yeat effectively rides the beat at times, while at others, he rebelliously dismisses its rhythm." Quincy also compliments Summrs' writing and how he "perfectly embodies the role of a troublemaker, appearing ready to crash out because his friends want to do the same".
