= Fly Nite =

"FLY NITË"

Song by Yeat featuring FKA Twigs

from the album Dangerous Summer (EP)
- Released: 1 August 2025
- Recorded: 2025
- Genre: Pop-rap
- Length: 3:48
- Label: Lyfestyle Corporation; Field Trip Recordings; Capitol Records
- Songwriters: Noah Olivier Smith; Tahliah Debrett Barnet; Lucien Dunne; Marc-Daryl Etienne; Patrick Basler; Paul Omar Elkan Agyei
- Producers: Elkan; dwavyb; Lucid; Dolphin Talk; Manni Dee

"Fly Nite" (stylized in all caps and as "Fly Nitë"), is a song by American rapper Yeat, featuring English singer FKA Twigs, released on August 1, 2025 as the tenth track on his seventh EP Dangerous Summer. Released under Capitol Records and Field Trip Recordings, it was produced by Dolphin Talk, Elkan, Lucid, and DwavyB.

== Critical reception ==
Robin Murray, of Clash wrote how "Fly Nite" is sonorous and sensual, standing apart from the rest of the project. He writes how "Twigs brings out different aspects of Yeat’s own art", citing how "it’s a fascinating moment.". Bryson "Boom" Paul of HotNewHipHop writes how FKA Twigs adds a "haunting elegance" to the track. Quincy Dominic of Rating Games Music writes how "Fly Nite" is an honorable mention to his top 5 tracks off the EP. He writes how "Fly Nite" "stands out as the most complete and sonically cohesive track on the project," stating how the track is different from Yeat's typical rage heavy, and chaotic production. The track sees Yeat opt for a more subtle and ethereal approach. Quincy writes how "The synths drift like neon fog, and the atmosphere feels strangely delicate—almost haunting." Quincy also cites how Yeat's vocals sound "hypnotic and slick", while also "exuding the kind of cocky confidence that defines his persona." Flexing his "magnetic pull with women, wrapping brash declarations in smooth, gliding flows that hit more often than they miss." Quincy highlights how "Fly Nite" transforms in its final section, shifting into a signature FKA twigs moment with a frantic beat and soulful, ethereal vocals that contrast Yeat’s swagger. This unexpected transition elevates the track, showcasing its genre-blending creativity and demonstrating how strong Yeat sounds when he broadens his sonic palette.
