= Boolymon =

American rapper (born 2004)

- Boolymon in 2025

Background information
- Also known as: SnakeChildPain, Zaggabar
- Born: William Anthony Pisa-Relli; December 4, 2004 (age 21); Minnesota, U.S.
- Genres: Plugg; trap; dark plugg; rage
- Occupations: Rapper; record producer; songwriter
- Years active: 2021–present
- Member of: Balloon; Odd Squad Slimekrew

William Anthony Pisa-Relli (born December 4, 2004), known professionally as Boolymon (stylized in lowercase), is an American rapper, record producer, and songwriter. He is a member of the 2020s underground rap scene and a pioneer of the microgenre terror plugg. He has worked with several artists, including OsamaSon, Okaymar, KRBY, and Perubaby.

== Early life ==
William Anthony Pisa-Relli was born on December 4, 2004, in Minnesota.

== Career ==
Relli began creating music in 2021 after gaining support from his cousin and producer Twovrt. His debut track, "Don't Want Smoke," a collaboration with OsamaSon, was released in 2023.

In 2024, his debut album, titled Tony, and his collaborative albums with OsamaSon, titled 2 Slime and Still Slime, were unexpectedly removed on Spotify.

Following the initial takedowns, he continued uploading music under the moniker "snakechildpain".

Relli drew widespread attention and controversy for his unique production and provocative lyrics. In June 2025, he dropped his solo project Outstanding. Tracks like "Megalodon" and "Kookoo" went viral online. Relli is considered to be a pioneer of the dark plugg genre along with producers Squillo, TDF, and Smokingskul. Writing for Pitchfork, music journalist Kieran Press-Reynolds stated that the platform TikTok hosted "Boolymon shitposts". Writing for The Face, Press-Reynolds stated that Relli along with producers TDF, Perc40, and Twovrt had "been cooking up bass blitzes since at least early 2022. The most experimental beats sound almost hazardous, like prolonged exposure will permanently harm your ears".

== Controversy ==
On August 8, 2025, Relli shared on his Instagram story that he had to cancel his Florida show after Transportation Security Administration (TSA) didn't allow him to fly. On August 10, 2025 music distributor DistroKid formally notified Relli that his account was terminated under "editorial discretion" following policy violations. DistroKid subsequently removed his catalog across major streaming services, prompting Relli to claim on social media that he would pursue legal action. Following his collaborative project Party City with close affiliate Perubaby, released on February 28, 2026, Boolymon released his EP Glove World on June 2, 2026
