= Dangerous Summer (EP) =

EP by Yeat
- Released: August 1, 2025
- Genres: Hip-hop; trap; pop-rap
- Length: 33:47
- Labels: Lyfestyle; Field Trip; Capitol
- Producers: Aaron Shadrow; Ambezza; Bnyx; Dolphin Talk; Dwavyb; Elkan; Empathy; Fendii; Jahaan Sweet; Jasper Harris; Juice Cuice; Lucid; Maru; Orin; Sapjer; Synthetic; WhereTfIsRay; Yeat

Yeat chronology
Lyfestyle (2024)	Dangerous Summer (2025)	ADL (2026)

Singles from Dangerous Summer
- 1. "I'm Yeat" Released: July 18, 2025

Dangerous Summer is the seventh extended play (EP) by American rapper Yeat. It was released on August 1, 2025 through Field Trip Recordings, Lyfestyle, and Capitol Records. Following the release of his fifth studio album Lyfestyle in 2024, Yeat began working on new material later that year. While recording Dangerous Summer, he worked on material using his laptop collaborated with multiple record producers including Jasper Harris, Synthetic, Bnyx and Jahaan Sweet.

Dangerous Summer is a hip hop EP that explores themes of personal growth, improved well-being, and coming-of-age, as well as his signature themes of wealth, and global dominance. The EP was promoted with one single "I'm Yeat" and its cover art was shot by the American filmmaker Harmony Korine.

== Background and recording ==
During the composition of his fifth studio album Lyfestyle (2024), Yeat would wake up at 7 in the morning recording tracks by his bedside, as confirmed by his manager Zack Bia. Yeat had recorded the album using his laptop and collaborated with multiple record producers: Bnyx, Sapjer, Jahaan Sweet, Synthetic, and Jasper Harris.

== Release and promotion ==
Yeat released the music video for "Loose Leaf" on August 5, directed by EDGLRD and executive produced by Harmony Korine, featuring Yeat in a Florida motel surrounded by alligators. The cover art was shot by Korine, using live alligators. Yeat announced the details for the release of the EP, following his festival appearances with Drake and Don Toliver on Instagram. It was preceded by single "I'm Yeat," released on July 18, 2025, alongside its music video, with Bnyx credited as a featured artist, and contains additional contributions from NGeeYL, FKA Twigs, Don Toliver, and SahBabii. The CD was released through Complex Networks.

== Critical reception ==
Professional ratings
Review scores
Source	Rating
AllMusic	3/5 stars
Clash	7/10

Upon release, Dangerous Summer received "general favorable" reviews from critics. Robin Murray of Clash felt that the EP "reaffirms Yeat's vitality," singling out Don Toliver and FKA Twig's features for praise. While staff at TiVo found the project to be "looser and more casual" than Yeat's previous releases.

Complex named the EP as the 21st best album of 2025, with Jon Barlas calling it "the sharpest [Yeat] has sounded in his career." HotNewHipHop ranked the EP as the 39th best rap album of 2025. Crack Magazine listed it at #24, with writer Robert Kazandjian discussing how Yeat's voice sounded like a "lump of neon Play-Doh, manipulating it over psychedelic beats that feel like they were cooked up on board a tesseract." Kazandijan also praises the rapper's "nursery rhymes," stating how they're "downright hilarious", with an example of this being on the track "Loco"; on "Put It Ong", Kazandijan writes "25 seconds of sweet choral harmonies give way to intergalactic synth blasts before Yeat enters the fray with a breathy growl." Outside of the rage music featured, the writer also writes how there is some form of "refreshing soulfulness to his unselfconscious crooning", and an example of this would be on the track "Fly Nite", where he wrote how the track "blooms from woozy purple trap into liquid drum 'n' bass".

== Track listing ==
Dangerous Summer track listing
No.	Title	Writer(s)	Producer(s)	Length
1.	"Put It Ong"	Noah Smith; Benjamin Saint Fort; Paul Elkan; Jasper Levering; Lucien Dunne	Bnyx; Elkan; Sapjer; Lucid	2:37
2.	"Loco"	Smith; Levering; Javier Mercado; Juan Alvarado; Kuchmiy Alekseevich	Sapjer; Synthetic; Empathy; Maru	2:34
3.	"Loose Leaf"	Smith; Mercado; Joseph Fenderson; Raymond Reichenbach; Orin Friedman	Synthetic; Fendii; WhereTfIsRay; Orin	2:50
4.	"Oh I Did" (with NGeeYL)	Smith; Nigel Fullenwinder; Saint Fort	Yeat; Bnyx	2:56
5.	"Come n Go"	Smith; Saint Fort; Levering	Bnyx; Sapjer	3:18
6.	"[ADL Is Coming]"	Smith; Saint Fort; Dunne	Bnyx; Lucid	2:40
7.	"I'm Yeat" (with Bnyx)	Smith; Saint Fort; Levering	Bnyx; Sapjer	2:48
8.	"M.F.U." (with SahBabii)	Smith; Saaheem Valdery; Jasper Harris; Mathias Liyew; Aaron Shadrow	Yeat; Harris; Ambezza; Shadrow	2:43
9.	"2Tone" (with Don Toliver)	Smith; Caleb Toliver; Saint Fort; Jahaan Sweet	Yeat; Bnyx; Sweet	3:40
10.	"Fly Nite" (with FKA Twigs)	Smith; Tahliah Barnett; Elkan; Dunne; Patrick Basler; Marc-Darryl Etienne	Elkan; Lucid; Dolphin Talk; Dwavyb	3:48
11.	"Growing Pains"	Smith; Saint Fort; Levering; JeLeus Cornileus	Yeat; Bnyx; Sapjer; Juice Cuice	3:53
Total length:				33:47

Notes

- All track titles are stylized in all caps. Additionally, "Come n Go" and "Fly Nite" are stylized with umlaut diacritics over the letter E.

== Personnel ==
- Noah Smith – programming (4, 8, 9, 11), mixing (1–6, 8–11), recording (1–6, 8–11)
- Patrick Rosario – mastering, mixing (7), recording (7)
- Bnyx – programming (1, 4–7, 9, 11)
- Elkan – programming (1, 10)
- Lucid – programming (1, 6, 10)
- Sapjer – programming (1, 2, 5, 11)
- Empathy – programming (2)
- Maru – programming (2)
- Synthetic – programming (2, 3)
- Fendii – programming (3)
- Orin – programming (3)
- WhereTfIsRay – programming (3)
- NGeeYL – vocals (4)
- Aaron Shadrow – programming (8)
- Ambezza – programming (8)
- Ambezza – programming (8)
- Jasper Harris – programming (8)
- SahBabii – vocals (8)
- Don Toliver – vocals (9)
- Jahaan Sweet – programming (9)
- Dolphin Talk – programming (10)
- Dwavyb – programming (10)
- Juice Cuice – programming (11)

== Charts ==
Chart performance for Dangerous Summer
Chart (2025)	Peak position
Australian Albums (ARIA)	63
Australian Hip Hop/R&B Albums (ARIA)	11
Austrian Albums (Ö3 Austria)	28
Belgian Albums (Ultratop Flanders)	81
Belgian Albums (Ultratop Wallonia)	156
Canadian Albums (Billboard)	65
German Albums (Offizielle Top 100)	68
Hungarian Albums (MAHASZ)	29
Icelandic Albums (Tónlistinn)	17
Lithuanian Albums (AGATA)	17
New Zealand Albums (RMNZ)	27
Polish Albums (ZPAV)	24
Portuguese Albums (AFP)	32
Swiss Albums (Schweizer Hitparade)	15
US Billboard 200	9
US Top R&B/Hip-Hop Albums (Billboard)	4
