= Smokedope2016 =

American rapper (born 2001)

- Born: May 28, 2001 (age 25); Virginia Beach, Virginia
- Genres: Cloud rap; frat rap; emo rap; wave
- Years active: 2022–present
- Label: Listen to the Kids

Smokedope2016 (born May 28, 2001; stylized in all lowercase) is an American rapper and record producer from Virginia Beach, Virginia. He is known for obscuring his face in promotional material and in the public and being private about his personal life. Starting in 2022, he has released seven studio albums; his music has been compared to that of Yung Lean and Clams Casino.

== Early life ==
Smokedope2016 was born on May 28, 2001, in Virginia Beach, Virginia. He has an older brother and played basketball and skateboarded while growing up. Smokedope2016 first got into cloud rap in 2015 when Yung Lean came on while he was playing Counter-Strike late at night. In 2020, he tripped on acid for eight months straight, and he still feels lasting effects from it as of 2025.

== Career ==
Smokedope2016 began creating music in 2021, but did not release music until 2022. He released his early work under the alias Fairfieldd, which took more influence from Lil Peep and emo rap. To initially gain traction, he promoted his music on the Haunted Mound Discord server. The name "Smokedope2016" originated from his Steam username, swishersmoker420.

Smokedope2016 released his fourth studio album, 2016, on December 1, 2023. His fifth and sixth studio albums, The Comeup and The Peak, were released on May 24, 2024, and January 17, 2025, respectively and were the first two installments of a trilogy. The latter charted 9th on the Spotify album debut charts in the U.S. In mid-2025, he quit his job welding at a shipyard to pursue music full-time. The Comedown, the final installment of his album trilogy, was delayed a month for clearance reasons, releasing on March 27, 2026. In a positive review written by Billie Bugara for Pitchfork, Bugara heavily compared the album to Yung Lean's 2016 album Warlord.

== Influences and artistry ==
Smokedope2016's music has been described as cloud rap and compared to that of Black Kray, Eric Dingus, and Yung Lean, with experimental and ambient sounds and lush, ethereal beats similar to those of Clams Casino; his vocal inflection has been likened to that of artists in the Drain Gang collective. He also takes influence from the frat rap subgenre, with lyrics about women, cars, and getting high and making use of 2010s slang such as "faded", "crunk", and "marley". His early work was heavily influenced by Lil Peep and emo rap, with softer, acoustic production combined with lyrics about love.

== Discography ==
=== Studio albums ===
Title	Details
Smokeshop	Released: September 11, 2022; Label: Listen to the Kids; Formats: Digital download
Bando	Released: January 1, 2023; Label: Listen to the Kids; Formats: Digital download
Smokeshop 2	Released: June 2, 2023; Label: Listen to the Kids; Formats: Digital download
2016	Released: December 1, 2023; Label: Listen to the Kids; Formats: CD, Digital download
The Comeup	Released: May 24, 2024; Label: Listen to the Kids; Formats: CD, Digital download
The Peak	Released: January 17, 2025; Label: Listen to the Kids; Formats: CD, Digital download
The Comedown	Released: March 27, 2026; Label: Listen to the Kids; Formats: CD, Digital download

=== Extended plays ===
Title	Details
XTC	Released: November 27, 2022; Label: Listen to the Kids; Formats: CD, Digital download
