= Maxon Margiela =

American rapper (2004–2025)

Maxon
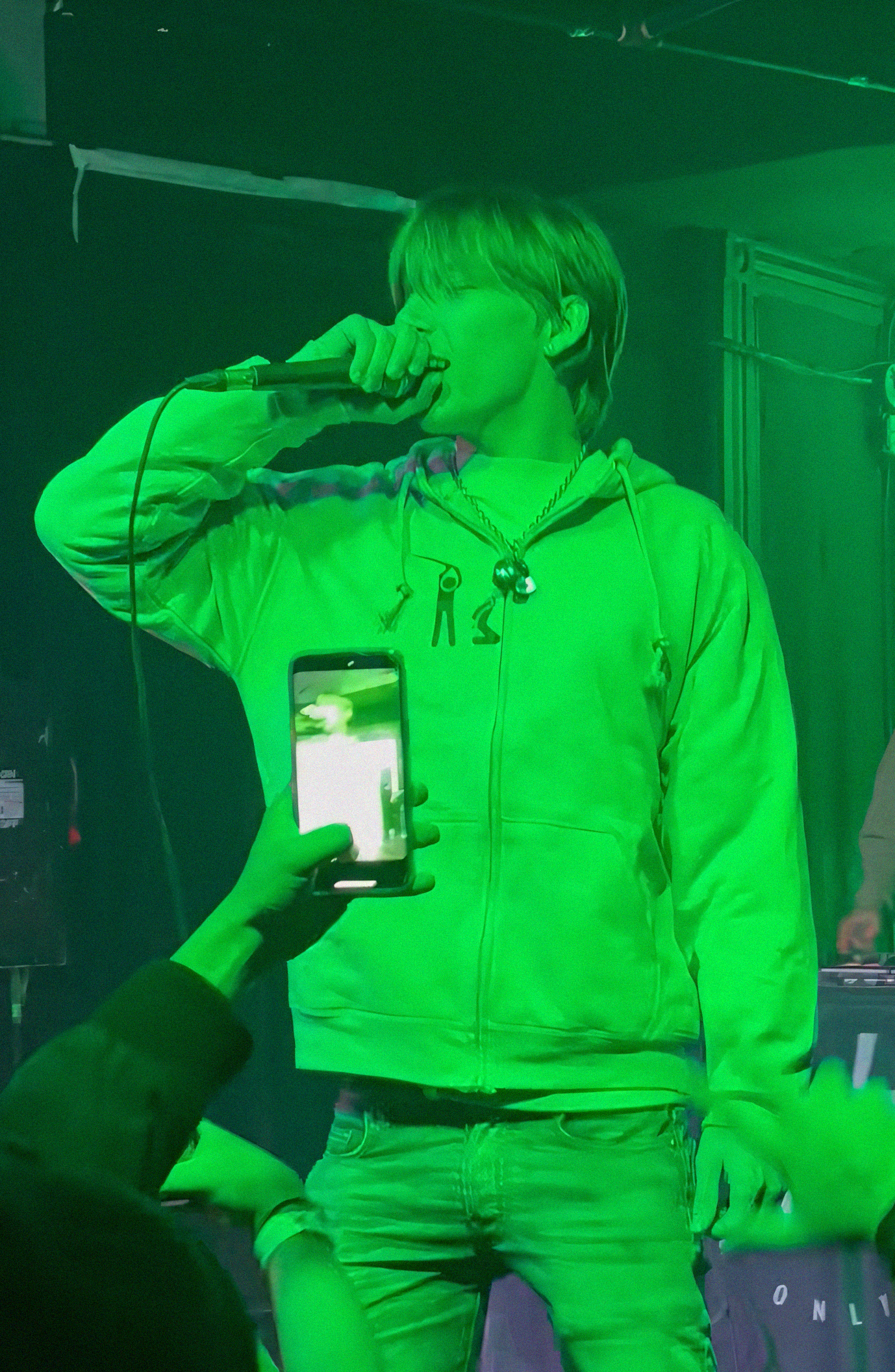
- Maxon in 2024

Background information
- Also known as: Maxon Margiela; #Filthy Kid
- Born: Mason Jorge Reyes; June 16, 2004; Orlando, Florida, U.S.
- Died: November 16, 2025 (aged 21) Orlando, Florida, U.S.
- Genres: Hip-hop; trap; lofi hip-hop; jerk; cloud rap
- Occupations: Rapper; songwriter
- Years active: 2024–2025
- Label: Columbia Records

Mason Jorge Reyes (June 16, 2004 – November 16, 2025), known professionally as Maxon (stylized in all lowercase; formerly as Maxon Margiela), was an American rapper and songwriter from Orlando, Florida. He began making music professionally in 2024 and rose to prominence later that year with the release of his singles "Austin Powers" and "Sexual Fantasies" with Percaso.

Reyes passed away on November 16, 2025, due to suicide. Following his death, his first posthumous album, Rainbows After Rain, was released exactly one year after his death.

== Early life ==
Mason Jorge Reyes was born in Orlando, Florida, on June 16, 2004. He described his hometown as having "mad culture" filled with "a boiling pot of people".

Reyes was kicked out of his parents' home at the age of 17. He entered rehab as a result of a court order issue, and subsequently moved in with his grandmother for a short period of time.

At the age of 18, Reyes got a job at a lighting company. Because of this, he was able to live on his own in Airbnbs around Orlando and the South Florida area.

== Career ==
=== 2020–2024: Early career and #Healthy ===
Reyes recalled staying at a high school friend's house in 2020, where they recorded a song together. Doing this sparked his initial interest in making music on his own after finding it fun. He began to create his own songs using BandLab shortly after, and posted these tracks to SoundCloud. He continued to post music on the platform for around two years throughout 2021 and 2022, but eventually stopped to remain working his full-time job. He picked up interest again in 2024, however, after a friend reminded him that the music that he had once made was "hard". In an interview with Needorkeep, Reyes explained that he derived his stage name, Maxon, by taking his first name, Mason, and replacing the letter s with the variable x, similar to how one might do so in a mathematical equation.

In February 2024, Reyes released his official debut single "Mansion" on SoundCloud. According to him, he recorded the song in his car with a friend, while it was raining outside. After recording, Maxon played the song for his friend, who invited him to Fashion Week to shoot a music video. Maxon subsequently quit his job and went to New York to film it. He cited this as where his career began.

Throughout 2024, he released several singles, and on August 24, 2024, Maxon performed live for the first time, headlining a concert in his hometown. The supporting acts included fellow Florida-based artist Brennan Jones, as well as Atlanta-based rapper Kahleation. On November 1, 2024, he released his debut extended play (EP), titled #Healthy. On November 24, Maxon released the single "Austin Powers", which began to go viral on social media shortly after.

=== 2025: Filthy and final releases ===
On February 14, 2025, he released his single "Sexual Fantasies", featuring close friend Percaso. Vivian Medithi of The Fader wrote how the song appeals to fans of hyperpop and electronic-influenced SoundCloud rap by praising its arpeggiated synths and overdriven bass production done by xai.flp and EliWTF. Medithi noted that Maxon glides through the beat with a low, controlled delivery, using subtle vocal shifts to make his lines memorable, while guest rapper Percaso bursts onto the track with energetic, flashy verses. Medithi also highlighted how the contrasting styles of the two artists complement each other, comparing their chemistry to "sea salt and caramel". The track was featured on the best rap songs of February 2025 by The Fader.

In March 2025, Maxon signed with Columbia Records. He continued to release numerous singles throughout 2025, and on July 23, he released his debut mixtape, Filthy. It featured his lead single "Austin Powers", as well as other singles that led up to its release, such as "Suck!", "Tokyo Drift", and "Sexual Fantasies".

== Artistry ==
In an interview with Sadprt, Reyes named Kanye West, Kodak Black, Future, Young Thug and Speaker Knockerz as some of his musical inspirations. Additionally, he cited in a 2024 interview that two dream collaborations of his would have been Yung Lean and Lucki. He also mentioned that Lil Uzi Vert was a major influence to his artistic sound and image.

== Personal life and death ==
Reyes enjoyed fishing with friends, which he grew up doing. He was also a fan of South Park, and named "How to Eat with Your Butt" from the fifth season of the show as his favorite episode.

On November 16, 2025, it was announced on social media, and later confirmed by friends and family, that Reyes had died by suicide in his hometown at the age of 21. His death was confirmed by the Orange County Medical Examiner's Office, though the cause of death was initially kept undisclosed.

== Posthumous releases ==
In 2026, Maxon's first posthumous album, Rainbows After Rain, was released. It was anticipated by the two singles, "Out West", released on September 19, 2025 and already present in his last EP, and "Phone Buzzin", published on June 16, 2026 in commemoration of his birthday. On November 16, 2026, Rainbows After Rain was officially released to streaming platforms.

== Discography ==
=== Studio albums ===
Title	Details
Rainbows After Rain	Released: November 16, 2026; Label: Surrounded By Idiots, West End Entertainment LLC; Formats: Digital download, streaming

=== Mixtapes ===
Title	Details
Filthy	Released: July 23, 2025; Label: Columbia Records; Formats: Digital download, streaming

=== Extended plays ===
Title	Details
#Healthy	Released: November 1, 2024; Label: Self-released; Formats: Digital download, streaming
Kiss The Future! ! !	Released: October 10, 2025; Label: Columbia Records; Formats: Digital download, streaming

=== As lead artist ===
Title	Year	Album
"Mansion"	2024	Non-album singles
"Booger"	2024	Non-album singles
"FilthyJeans"	2024	Non-album singles
"Gardens"	2024	Non-album singles
"Fadeaway"	2024	Non-album singles
"WTW"	2024	Non-album singles
"Syrup"	2024	Non-album singles
"GoyardBag"	2024	Non-album singles
"Caca"	2024	Non-album singles
"One Way"	2024	Non-album singles
"Mustard"	2024	Non-album singles
"Smoke"	2024	Non-album singles
"GreatDay"	2024	Non-album singles
"Looseleaf"	2024	SS24
"My Time"	2024	SS24
"Austin Powers"	2024	Filthy
"High Like Me"	2024	I <3 Maxon (Note: The cover art differs across streaming platforms, and is alternatively titled "I Love Maxon" on some as well.)
"EenieMineyMo"	2024	I <3 Maxon
"Overtime"	2025	Sample 25
"PB&J"	2025	Sample 25
"Sexual Fantasies" (featuring Percaso)	2025	Filthy
"Tokyo Drift"	2025	Filthy
"TTB"	2025	Filthy
"Suck!"	2025	Filthy
"Hate Me 2"	2025	Non-album singles
"Out West"	2025	Non-album singles
"Opiate Dreaming"	2025	Non-album singles
"Sand Castle"	2025	Non-album singles
"Take Me Out The Swamp"	2025	Non-album singles
"Maxon ("On The Radar") Freestyle (August 10)"	2025	Non-album singles
"Hate The Morning"	2025	Kiss The Future!!!
"Dropped My Blunt"	2025	Kiss The Future!!!
"Phone Buzzin"	2026	Rainbows After Rain

=== As featured artist ===
Title	Year	Album
"Get Dat Money" (Dxrop featuring Percaso and Maxon)	2025	#25 SZN
"Tuesday" (Dazed Within featuring Maxon, Percaso, and Reddglk	2026	Non-album single
