= Lyfestyle =

Studio album by Yeat
- Released: October 18, 2024
- Genres: Trap; rage
- Length: 62:42
- Labels: Lyfestyle; Field Trip; Capitol
- Producers: 730hahah; Amorii; Brody500; Chef9thegod; Cloud; Darkoivx; Dreamawake; Empathy; Flowrency; JDolla; LRBG; OMGZanoza; Oscar4400XY; Primo; Quincy Sxbra; Radiate; Rafeprod; Robin; Sapjer; Sharkboy; Shazy; Skipass; Streo; Synthetic; TC; Thankyouwill; Upmadeit; Venny; XBrvdy; Yateski; Yeat

Yeat chronology
2093 (2024)	Lyfestyle (2024)	Dangerous Summer (2025)

Lyfestyle (stylized in all caps) is the fifth studio album by American rapper Yeat, released through Lyfestyle Corporation, Field Trip Recordings and Capitol Records, on October 18, 2024. The album features guest appearances from Don Toliver, Kodak Black, Lil Durk, and Summrs. The album serves as a follow-up to his previous studio album, 2093 (2024). The album has its tracks mainly looped due to Yeat feeling rushed after the hate on his other album that was released on the same year, 2093 (2024). The album debuted on number one on US Billboard 200 selling 89,000 album equivalent units in its first week, marking it as Yeat's first project to ever do so.

== Background and recording ==
Upon the release of the album, Yeat appeared in an interview with The Fader, during which he revealed he had 4,800 beats shortlisted for the album. Yeat's manager, Zack Bia stated that Yeat would wake up at "7 in the morning my time, 4 in the morning on the West Coast" to FaceTime him and record tracks on his bedside. Yeat admitted that "this time it [took] longer than it normally ever has" to decide upon the album's final tracklist and that the album is "a little bit more curated" than his previous bodies of work. In the interview, Yeat expressed that "Lyfestyle [is] basically just my normal rap shit", and that "it's not futuristic, it's not like a whole different world" while noting that it's more "polished" than his previous records. Bia added that "Noah's [Yeat's] music-making process is so insulated because he makes music only by himself" and that "there's no outside noise when he's actually making music. Even when I'm with him, he'll be like, 'Okay, I'm gonna go make music now, you guys can leave".

During the interview, the album's executive producer Synthetic revealed that Yeat asked him to produce the entirety of the album:

When it comes to creating something new with an artist and you're really trying to push to that next level, it's complicated, because you don't want to push too hard. [...] 2093 was very experimental, right? [And] the feedback on that was very mixed. When we were trying to craft this album, we wanted to make sure that we were delivering what the fans wanted but also creating something that the fans hadn't heard yet but felt familiar.

== Release and promotion ==
Following the release of 2093 in February of the same year, Yeat would begin to tease "a year['s] worth of music". On September 17, 2024, Yeat's label, Lyfestyle Corporation shared a video of "Lyfestyle" being spray painted in graffiti style on a Lamborghini Huracán, parked on Rodeo Drive. Two days later, on September 19, he released the SoundCloud-exclusive single "TURNMEUP", the song's cover art being the spray-painted Lamborghini Huracán. On October 9, Yeat released the official trailer for Lyfestyle. On October 14, Yeat shared the album's cover art, soon followed by the release of the album's official tracklist on October 17.

== Critical reception ==
Professional ratings
Aggregate scores
Source	Rating
Metacritic	63/100
Review scores
Source	Rating
Clash	7/10
Pitchfork	5.6/10
Rolling Stone	2.5/5 stars
Slant	4/5 stars

According to the review aggregator Metacritic, Lyfestyle received "generally favorable reviews" based on a weighted average score of 63 out of 100 from 5 critic scores. Writing for Clash, Robin Murray wrote that "Yeat manages to conjure a form of explicit subtlety", however, "there's so much to absorb" and at times, the album can become "overwhelming". Concluding his review, Murray wrote that "continuing his game of tension and release, revelation and disguise, Lyfestyle reinforces Yeat's singular status". Rolling Stone's Mosi Reeves wrote that the album "details distorted in a cacophony of electronic noise" and that "it's an album that invites fast-forwarding to one's favorite cuts, not deep and focused listening". Paul Attard for Slant stated that the album "is Yeat's giddiest release to date" and that "each song ably [builds] off the momentum of the one before it", allowing the album to "feels like one constantly mutating track". Attard noted that the album "might be too cohesive, despite periodic genre switch-ups", before concluding that "the quality and sleekness of Lyfestyle should mark the definitive end of any doubts about Yeat's musicianship".

== Commercial performance ==
In the United States, Lyfestyle debuted at number one on the Billboard 200, earning 89,000 album-equivalent units (including 60,000 in pure sales) in its first week. Thus causing Lyfestyle to become Yeat's first number one album on the chart, alongside his fifth consecutive top ten. The album accumulated a total of 39.67 million on-demand streams of its songs. In its second week, Lyfestyle set the record as the seventh largest drop from number one in Billboard 200 history, as the album descended 69 spots to number 70 in its second week.

Contributing factors for Lyfestyle's pure album sales count to relatively high could be because Lyfestyle is Yeat's first album to be released on CD, as well as on his official website different box sets that include merchandise such as T-shirts, balaclavas, and hoodies were released.

== Track listing ==
Lyfestyle track listing
No.	Title	Writer(s)	Producer(s)	Length
1.	"Geek Time"	Noah Smith; Javier Mercado; Brady Tremblay; Primo Pepper; Wyndham Srenaski	Synthetic; XBrvdy; Primo; Yateski	2:50
2.	"STFU"	Smith; Alexey Grachev; Fedor Kulachkov; Mercado; Daniel Mohammadi; Tommy Wright III	Sharkboy; Skipass; Synthetic; Upmadeit	1:44
3.	"They Tell Me"	Smith; Juan Alvarado; Mercado; Rafe Nelson; Pepper	Empathy; Primo; Synthetic; Yeat; Rafeprod	2:53
4.	"Heard of Me"	Smith; Alvarado; Steven Giron; Mercado; Nelson; Pepper	Empathy; Primo; Synthetic; Venny; Rafeprod	2:33
5.	"Speedball"	Smith; Alvarado; Mercado; Giron; Nelson	Empathy; Synthetic; Venny; Rafeprod	2:17
6.	"U Don't Know Lyfe"	Smith; Giron; Mercado; Ilya Shishkin; Srenaski	Shazy; Synthetic; Venny; Yateski	3:13
7.	"Orchestrate"	Smith; Keian Bohn; Mercado; Pepper	Primo; Streo; Synthetic; Yeat	2:53
8.	"Be Quiet" (with Kodak Black)	Smith; Gonçalo Brás; Devokeyous Hamilton; Bill Kapri; Pablo Sanchez; Aaron Tanarasoo	Chef9thegod; Cloud; Dreamawake	2:54
9.	"The Costes"	Smith; Giron; Mercado; Pepper; Matvei Shalnev	OMGZanoza; Primo; Synthetic; Venny; Yeat	2:33
10.	"Go2Work" (with Summrs)	Smith; Thomas Cooper; Robin Deibert-Patterson; Giron; Deante Johnson; Mercado	Robin; Synthetic; TC; Venny	3:23
11.	"Gone 4 a Min"	Smith; Jasper Levering	Sapjer	2:15
12.	"Forever Again"	Smith; Quincy Essibrah; Levering	Quincy Sxbra; Sapjer	3:19
13.	"On 1"	Smith; Grachev; Mercado; Pepper; Tremblay	Primo; Sharkboy; Synthetic; XBrvdy	3:04
14.	"Flytroop"	Smith; Grachev; Mercado; Shalnev; Tremblay	OMGZanoza; Sharkboy; Synthetic; XBrvdy	2:46
15.	"Eliminate"	Smith; Alvarado; Mercado; Spencer Mott; Nelson	Empathy; Radiate; Synthetic; Yeat; Rafeprod	2:59
16.	"Lying 5 Fun"	Smith; William Lambert; Mercado; Nelson	Synthetic; Thankyouwill; Rafeprod	3:54
17.	"New High" (with Don Toliver)	Smith; Bohn; Mercado; Pepper; Caleb Toliver	Primo; Streo; Synthetic	2:41
18.	"So What"	Smith; Alvarado; Giron; Mercado; Nelson	Empathy; Synthetic; Venny; Yeat; Rafeprod	2:24
19.	"Lyfestyle" (with Lil Durk)	Smith; Durk Banks; Jai'el Blackmon; Oscar Fatyga; Sanchez	Dreamawake; JDolla; Yeat; Oscar4400XY	2:54
20.	"God Talkin Shhh"	Smith; Mercado; Pepper; Srenaski; Artem Zherdev	Flowrency; Primo; Synthetic; Yeat; Yateski	3:15
21.	"Lyfe Party"	Smith; Alvarado; Giron; Mercado; Nelson	Empathy; Rafeprod; Synthetic; Venny; Yeat	2:40
22.	"Fate" (Bonus)	Smith; Mercado; Darko Ivančević; Luke O'Donovan; Gabriel St-Onge; Nikita Zvorygin	730hahah; Amorii; Darkoivx; LRBG	3:18
Total length:				62:42

Digital deluxe
No.	Title	Length
23.	"Project Lyfestyle"	2:36
24.	"For Lyfe"	2:22
25.	"Night Come"	2:20
26.	"5Brazy Remix" (featuring Quavo)	2:58

Dune edition
No.	Title	Length
22.	"Style Lyfe"	3:13
23.	"Back Then"	3:08

Drone edition
No.	Title	Length
22.	"5Brazy"	2:41
23.	"Barbarian"	2:54

Horse edition
No.	Title	Length
22.	"Graveyard"	2:20
23.	"Gone"	2:03

=== Notes ===
- Track titles are stylized in all caps. If a track title has more than two of the letter E, the latter E is stylized with an umlaut (ë); this does not apply to "Speedball", "Be Quiet", "Forever Again", "Lyfestyle", "Lyfe Party", "New High" or "U Don't Know Lyfe".
- "Be Quiet" contains background vocals from Lazer Dim 700.

== Personnel ==
- Yeat – vocals, mixing
- Anthony Kilhoffer – mastering

== Charts ==
=== Weekly charts ===
Weekly chart performance for Lyfestyle
Chart (2024)	Peak position
Australian Albums (ARIA)	46
Australian Hip Hop/R&B Albums (ARIA)	9
Austrian Albums (Ö3 Austria)	21
Belgian Albums (Ultratop Flanders)	55
Belgian Albums (Ultratop Wallonia)	131
Canadian Albums (Billboard)	13
Dutch Albums (Album Top 100)	47
French Albums (SNEP)	107
German Albums (Offizielle Top 100)	59
Hungarian Albums (MAHASZ)	16
Irish Albums (IRMA)	66
New Zealand Albums (RMNZ)	29
Norwegian Albums (VG-lista)	24
Polish Albums (ZPAV)	44
Swiss Albums (Schweizer Hitparade)	8
UK Albums (Official Charts)	52
UK R&B Albums (Official Charts)	14
US Billboard 200	1
US Top R&B/Hip-Hop Albums (Billboard)	1

=== Year-end charts ===
Year-end chart performance for Lyfestyle
Chart (2025)	Position
US Top R&B/Hip-Hop Albums (Billboard)	81
