= Summrs =

American rapper (born 1999)

- Also known as: Lil Summrs; DJ; Rino; Lil Rino; Louieveedee; Summrbangz; Summrsxo; Summrino; BADMAN
- Born: Deante Adam Johnson; November 18, 1999 (age 27); Lafayette, Louisiana, U.S.
- Origin: Eunice, Louisiana, U.S.
- Genres: Hip-hop; PluggnB
- Occupations: Rapper; Singer; Songwriter; Producer; Vocal Engineer
- Instrument: Vocals
- Years active: 2016–present
- Labels: Victor Victor; Capitol; 10K
- Formerly of: Hellworld; Slayworld

Deante Adam Johnson (born November 18, 1999), known professionally as Summrs, is an American rapper and singer. He signed with Victor Victor Worldwide and Capitol Records in 2021, but left the following year and later signed with 10K Projects. He is best known for being one of the pioneers of the PluggnB subgenre through his releases on major streaming platforms.

== Career ==
=== 2016-2019: Early career and breakthrough ===
Summrs started making music around the age of 16, recording his early songs using an Xbox headset and the music software Mixcraft. Before he had access to more professional recording equipment, he was already experimenting with making music on his own. By 2017, he had started releasing more projects, including three mixtapes from his All Summr series. Around this time, he also began working with fellow rapper Autumn!, releasing the collaborative projects 2 Seasons and 2 Seasons II. In April 2018, Summrs appeared on Florida rapper Weiland's single "Who's Better". He rose to prominence as a pioneering figure in the PluggnB subgenre in 2018, releasing a series of projects, most notably ##Endeavor777 and Devotion, as well as ##Bellworld, followed by ##Bellworld 2, No Regrets and Revived. Summrs received praise for the single "Should've Known" featuring Cash Bently, released through SoundCloud in February 2019. Pitchfork Media declared it "the must-hear rap song of the day." Summrs released Isolation, a 15-track album on October 15, 2019.

=== 2020–2021: Viral success ===
In January 2021, Summrs appeared on the single "Mother of My Kids" by TyFontaine. He again collaborated with TyFontaine on the deluxe version of his album Ascension. In December 2021, he released a SoundCloud exclusive track with Yeat titled "Countup".

=== 2022-Present ===
June 2022 marked the release of his debut full-length album Fallen Raven, featuring the tracks "Swing Ya Pole" and "So Much Cheese", both of which garnered mainstream attention. In January 2023, he was featured on Trippie Redd's song "Biggest Bird" from Redd's album Mansion Musik, and appeared in the music video. In late 2024, he gained more recognition with his single "Marble Floors" on his Nightfall EP, his "GO2WORK" feature on Yeat's album Lyfestyle, and his song "Rino Hercules", engineered by streamer PlaqueBoyMax.

== Musical style ==
Chris Richards of The Washington Post describes Summrs' musical style as "sticky, Auto-Tuned rhymes sounding as if they were melting the midday sun". Summrs is known for being one of the main pioneers of the pluggnb subgenre of plugg music. Pitchfork writer Alphonse Pierre compares Summrs' vocal style to Lil Tracy, with more influences from R&B.

== Personal life ==
Summrs attended Eunice High School. He frequently references his late grandmother Brenda Randle in his song lyrics, who died on December 25, 2020.

== Discography ==
=== Studio albums ===
List of albums, with selected details and chart positions
Title	Album details	Peak chart positions
Title	Album details	US Heat.
All Summr	Released: June 6, 2017; Label: Self-released; Format: Digital download, streaming	—
All Summr 2	Released: July 31, 2017; Label: Self-released; Format: Digital download, streaming	—
Summrs & Friends	Released: August 24, 2017; Label: Self-released; Format: Digital download, streaming	—
All Summr 3	Released: September 15, 2017; Label: Self-released; Format: Digital download, streaming	—
##Bellworld2	Released: July 2, 2018; Label: Self-released; Format: Digital download, streaming	—
Devotion	Released: August 17, 2018; Label: Self-released; Format: Digital download, streaming	—
World Against Me	Released: June 21, 2019; Label: Self-released; Format: Digital download, streaming	—
Isolation	Released: October 15, 2019; Label: Self-released; Format: Digital download, streaming	—
Intoxicated	Released: March 13, 2021; Label: Self-released; Format: Digital download, streaming	—
Nothing More Nothing Less	Released: September 27, 2021; Label: Self-released; Format: Digital download, streaming	—
Fallen Raven	Released: June 27, 2022; Label: Self-released; Format: Digital download, streaming	6
Stuck in My Ways	Released: January 27, 2023; Label: 10K Projects; Format: Digital download, streaming	13
Ghost	Released: April 28, 2023; Label: 10K Projects; Format: Digital download, streaming	—
What We Didn't Have	Released: September 18, 2023; Label: 10K Projects; Format: Digital download, streaming	—
B4daRaven	Released: April 12, 2024; Label: 10K Projects; Format: Digital download, streaming	—
BADMAN	Released: November 20, 2026; Label: Independent; Format: Digital download, streaming	
"—" denotes a recording that did not chart.

=== Mixtapes ===
List of mixtapes, with selected details
Title	Album details
##Endeavor777	Released: March 18, 2018
Departure666 (Living to Die..)	Released: May 13, 2018

=== Extended plays ===
List of extended plays, with selected details
Title	EP details
Backwoods	Released: October 6, 2016
I Believe in Myself	Released: January 19, 2017
Hot Like Summer, The EP	Released: February 5, 2017
IDFW Niggas	Released: March 28, 2017
2 Seasons (with Autumn)	Released: July 17, 2017
XoolSummr (with StoopidXool)	Released: October 10, 2017
2 Seasons II (with Autumn)	Released: October 16, 2017
Patience Is Key	Released: November 18, 2018
Merry Xanmas	Released: December 25, 2017
Drug/Love!	Released: January 23, 2018
Bellworld	Released: April 30, 2018
Revived	Released: November 18, 2018
Better Left Alone	Released: February 27, 2019
SummrWave (with Kidwave)	Released: April 1, 2019
Evolved	Released: August 7, 2019
Wick & Clancy: 2S3 Vol. 1 (with Autumn)	Released: August 24, 2019
La Dolce Vita	Released: October 20, 2020
What We Have	Released: June 13, 2021
Nightfall	Released: August 2, 2024
