= Ghost Mountain (rapper) =

American rapper (born 2001)

- Ghost Mountain shot by Eternity Chaos in 2025 for PAPER Magazine

Background information
- Born: Wren Elliot Kosinski; June 10, 2001 (age 25); California, U.S.
- Genres: Alternative hip hop; witch house
- Occupations: Rapper; singer; songwriter; musician; record producer
- Years active: 2019–2021; 2024–present
- Member of: Haunted Mound

Wren Elliot Kosinski (born 2001), known professionally as Ghost Mountain, is an American rapper, singer, songwriter, musician, and record producer. He gained notoriety in 2019 after co-founding, alongside childhood friend and rapper Sematary, the record label and rap collective Haunted Mound. Since 2019, he has released one solo mixtape, two collaborative mixtapes, and a collaborative extended play, all with Sematary.

== Career ==
Wren Elliot Kosinski was born in Northern California on June 10th, 2001. He grew up around Sacramento and had stated he had a love for music from a young age, influenced by bands such as Modest Mouse and The Unicorns. Further, he has stated that until he met Sematary, whom he met in middle school, he had been unable to make music of his own. His name, Ghost Mountain, came from a line in a song by The Unicorns off the album Who Will Cut Our Hair When We're Gone?.

In 2019, along with Sematary, he formed the rap collective Haunted Mound, notable for its horrorcore and witch house-influenced production and aesthetic. In 2021, after releasing the mixtapes Grave House and Hundred Acre Wrist Hosted by DJ Sorrow with Sematary, he would depart from Haunted Mound and erase his catalog, stepping away from music to focus on education. He would remain in silence until September 2024, when he released the single "Apollon". Moreover, releasing his debut solo mixtape October Country on March 7, 2025, via Haunted Mound, notably fusing genres such as trap, folk, and dance along with horrorcore and witch house. The record was executively produced and features Sematary on multiple tracks. He would embark on a tour with Haunted Mound following the mixtapes release. In 2026, Ghost Mountain opened for experimental rock band The Garden.

== Discography ==
=== Mixtapes ===
List of mixtapes, with release date and label shown
Title	Details
Grave House (with Sematary)	Released: August 16, 2019; Re-Released: April 18, 2025; Label: Self-released (Re-released under Haunted Mound); Format: Digital download, streaming, CD
Hundred Acre Wrist Hosted by DJ Sorrow (with Sematary)	Released: July 31, 2020; Re-Released: April 18, 2025; Label: Self-released (Re-released under Haunted Mound); Format: Digital download, streaming, CD
October Country	March 7, 2025; Label: Haunted Mound; Format: Digital download, streaming, CD, LP

=== Extended plays ===
List of extended plays, with release date and label shown
Title	Details
The Wagoner EP (with Sematary)	Released: April 11, 2025; Label: Haunted Mound; Format: Digital download, streaming; Note: Its songs were originally released as standalone uploads and leaks in 2020, but was not officially released as its own EP until 2025.

=== Singles ===
- Coil (2019)
- Apollon (2024)
- Dark Harvest (featuring Sematary) (2024)
- Donkey-Boy (featuring Olan Monk) (2025)
- Dyer Lane (featuring Sematary) (2026)
- Outlast (2026)
- Voorheez (2026)

==== Featured singles ====
- DIE4U (Eternity Chaos featuring Ghost Mountain) (2025)
- NOTHINGG (C1TRVS featuring Ghost Mountain) (2026)
- GLOOMROOM (Sematary featuring Ghost Mountain) (2026)
- Winchester (Buckshot featuring Ghost Mountain) (2026)
