= Sabukaru =

Tokyo-based culture magazine

- Sabukaru Issue 2; variant cover art by Aya Takano.
- Editor: Adrian Bianco
- Categories: Art, fashion, music, and pop-culture
- Frequency: Annual (print), continuous (online)
- Founder: Adrian Bianco
- Founded: 2017
- First issue: July 29, 2025 (print)
- Country: Japan
- Based in: Tokyo
- Language: English, Japanese
- Website: https://sabukaru.online/

Sabukaru (stylized: sabukaru, lit. 'subculture') is an online and print magazine based in Tokyo, Japan, focusing on international and Japanese art, fashion, and music, in addition to pop and underground culture. It was founded in Germany by Adrian Bianco in 2017 (Note: Sabukaru's website and most secondary sources list the founding date as 2017, but the founder Adrian Bianco describes it as a blog under a different name at that time) and moved to Tokyo in 2019. The magazine is published primarily in English, with some Japanese-language articles.

In addition to publishing online and print articles, Sabukaru has collaborated with Japanese and international fashion brands (e.g. Birkenstock and Asics) and organized fashion-related events, pop-ups and showroom projects.

== History ==
In 2017, Sabukaru was founded as a personal blog in Germany by journalist Adrian Bianco. Following a visit to Japan while working for Vice, in 2019, he relocated Sabukaru to Tokyo, Japan. With himself as the editor-in-chief, it developed into an online (and later print) magazine with staff editors and an office in Tokyo. The magazine has been described as focusing on Japanese underground culture, youth fashion and independent artists.

In 2021, Bianco announced intentions to create a print edition of Sabukaru and host events tied to the magazine.

The first annual printed edition was published in July 2025. The printed edition is published in English and contains collaborations with international artists, often based in Japan and Taiwan. Each edition is printed with multiple cover pages by varied visual artists and photographers. It is released internationally through online stores, with retail distribution in Taiwan.
