= Come n Go =

2025 song by Yeat

Song by Yeat

from the EP Dangerous Summer
- Released: August 1, 2025
- Genre: Trap
- Length: 3:18
- Label: Lyfestyle; Field Trip; Capitol
- Songwriters: Noah Smith; Benjamin Saint Fort; Jasper Levering
- Producers: Bnyx; Sapjer

Music video
- "Come n Go" on YouTube

"Come n Go" (stylized in all caps and as "Comë n Go") is a song by American rapper Yeat, released on August 1, 2025 from his seventh EP Dangerous Summer. It was produced by Bnyx and Sapjer.

== Composition ==
The song uses vocal distortion, and finds Yeat giving a melodic performance.

== Music video ==
The music video was filmed at the Cologne Cathedral in Germany, in black-and-white. It features contrasting scenes of Yeat with legions of his fans and in quiet moments of wandering empty arenas and hotels. At various points of the clip, Yeat is depicted flying through the sky (in a similar way to Peter Pan), which is presumably a visual metaphor for getting high. Following the video's release, it generated positive attention from fans.

== Critical reception ==
HotNewHipHop ranked the song as the 2nd best rap song of 2025. Complex on the other hand ranked "Come n Go" at number 2 out of 50 on their equivalent year-end list.

== Charts ==
Chart performance for "Come n Go"
Chart (2025)	Peak position
Austria (Ö3 Austria Top 40)	46
Canada (Canadian Hot 100)	51
Ireland (IRMA)	91
Latvia Streaming (LaIPA)	12
Lithuania (AGATA)	16
New Zealand Hot Singles (RMNZ)	20
Switzerland (Schweizer Hitparade)	52
UK Singles (Official Charts)	88
US Billboard Hot 100	93
US Hot R&B/Hip-Hop Songs (Billboard)	15

== Certifications ==
Certifications for "Come n Go"
Region	Certification	Certified units/sales
Canada (Music Canada)	Gold	40,000^{‡}
New Zealand (RMNZ)	Gold	15,000^{‡}
United States (RIAA)	Gold	500,000^{‡}
United States (RIAA)	Platinum	1,000,000^{‡}
^{‡} Sales+streaming figures based on certification alone.
