= Tdf (producer) =

American record producer (born 2003)

TDF
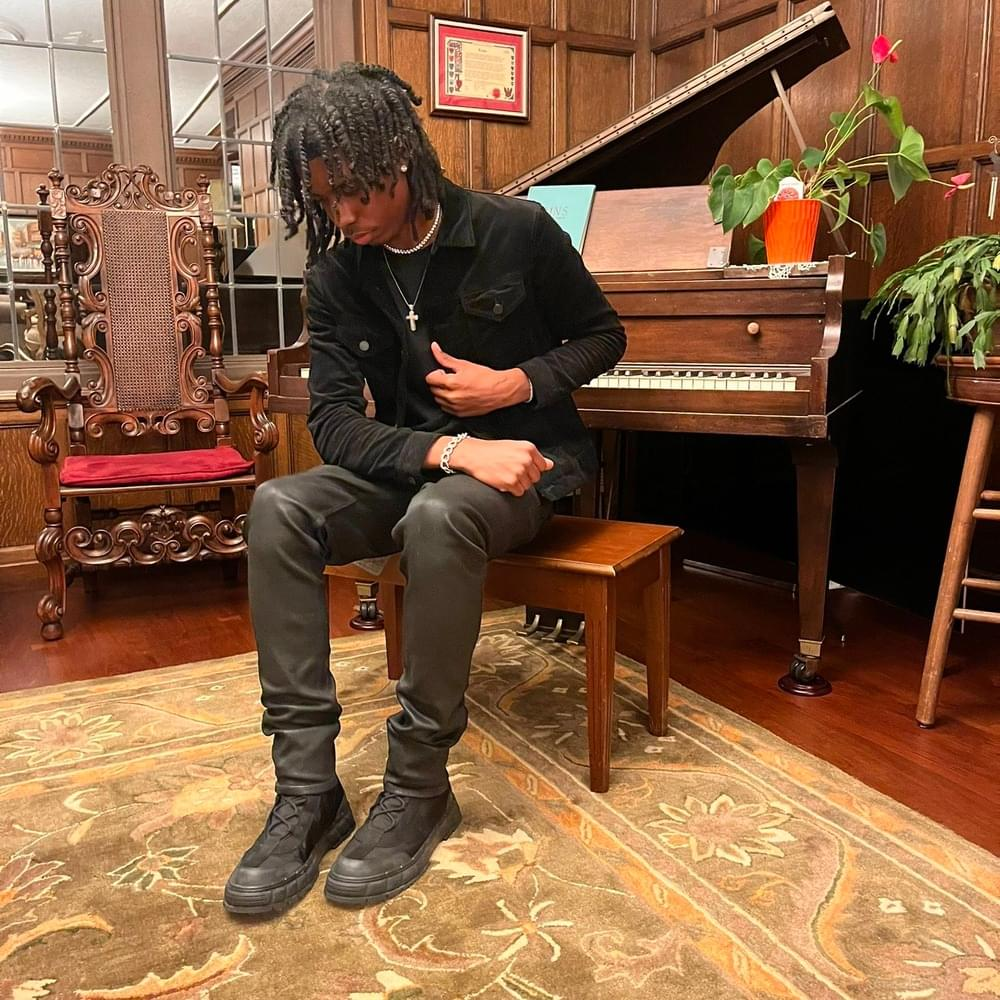
- Jones in 2023

Background information
- Also known as: OneTDF
- Born: Tyrese Jones; June 17, 2003 (age 23); Minneapolis, Minnesota, U.S.
- Genres: Hip hop; trap; plugg
- Occupation: Record producer
- Years active: 2017–present
- Member of: SlimeKrew

Tyrese Jones (born June 17, 2003), known professionally as TDF (stylized in lowercase), is an American record producer from Minneapolis, Minnesota. He is known for pioneering the genre terror plugg, a microgenre of plugg.

Since his career started in 2017, Jones has worked with several notable artists throughout his career, including artists such as Kura, Iayze, D0llywood1, Xaviersobased, Yhapojj, Maajins, Tana, OsamaSon, and Smokingskul, among others.

His project Blueprint was critically acclaimed and was listed as one of the best rap albums of 2024 by Pitchfork.

== Early life ==
Tyrese Jones was born and raised in the North part of Minneapolis, Minnesota. Growing up, Jones's father introduced him to Michael Jackson. He listened to Beyoncé, R&B, and Kanye West with his mother. Jones is not fond of older rap besides Tupac and The Notorious B.I.G. In 2013, Jones stated that he began making music on the last day of school. He used to rap before producing and went to college.

When Jones was in middle school, he was introduced to drill rap, when he listened to artists such as Chief Keef. Jones also listened to Young Pappy. He began producing in 2017 when his mother gave her used laptop to him.

== Career ==
In 2017, Jones began producing music. He stated that when he started producing, he used to make XXXTentacion, Playboi Carti, BrentRambo, and MexikoDro type beats. After Carti released his self-titled album, he discovered Pi'erre Bourne, whom Jones later fell in love with sonically. As he got older, he began taking major inspiration from Bourne, StoopidXool, and XanGang. After befriending Okaymar in 2019, Jones cited how he began taking music seriously.

In 2021, Jones self-released his debut album, titled TDF & Friends 2. He would later release a sequel, followed by TDF & Friends 3 in 2022. That same year, he would also release Religion. Entering 2023, Jones reached a breakthrough with the release of his project Blueprint. Upon release, it was critically acclaimed and was listed as one of the best rap albums of 2024 by Pitchfork. In 2025, Jones released Culture.

== Musical style ==
Jones's music is identified as terror plugg, which he helped pioneer; the genre is an evolved version of plugg featuring distorted 808s and eerie melodies. Alphonse Pierre of Pitchfork wrote how TDF's production sounds like "post-Pi'erre" stylistically. Pierre also noted how rapper and producer Ivvys' production on "Bikini" features "Ballistic percussion that feels ripped from a military drumline… [and] apocalyptically blown-out 808s", which ties in line with Perc40 and Jones' own production styles.

== Controversies ==
=== "No internet" ===
In around early 2025, a photo of Jones surfaced of him wearing a skull face covering resembling one worn by the Antioch High School shooter, a Neo-Nazi supremacist. Fans later responded to the incident with messages such as "He don't got internet," referencing when Young Thug defended James Harden for wearing a pro-police facemask saying "He don't have internet." This situation developed into an internet meme, with people putting Jones into "Agartha" and "Hyperborea" edits.

== Discography ==
=== Albums ===
Title	Details
TDF & Friends	Released: October 22, 2020; Labels: Self-released; Format: Digital download, streaming
TDF & Friends 2	Released: April 4, 2021; Labels: Self-released; Format: Digital download, streaming
TDF & Friends 3	Released: March 4, 2022; Labels: Self-released; Format: Digital download, streaming
Religion	Released: November 19, 2022; Labels: Self-released; Format: Digital download, streaming
Blueprint	Released: December 15, 2023; Labels: Self-released; Format: Digital download, streaming
Culture	Released: March 14, 2025; Labels: Self-released; Format: Digital download, streaming

=== Singles ===
Title	Year	Album
"get it (i love you too)" (with Samosthated)	2026	Non-album singles
