= Sematary =

American rapper (born 2000)

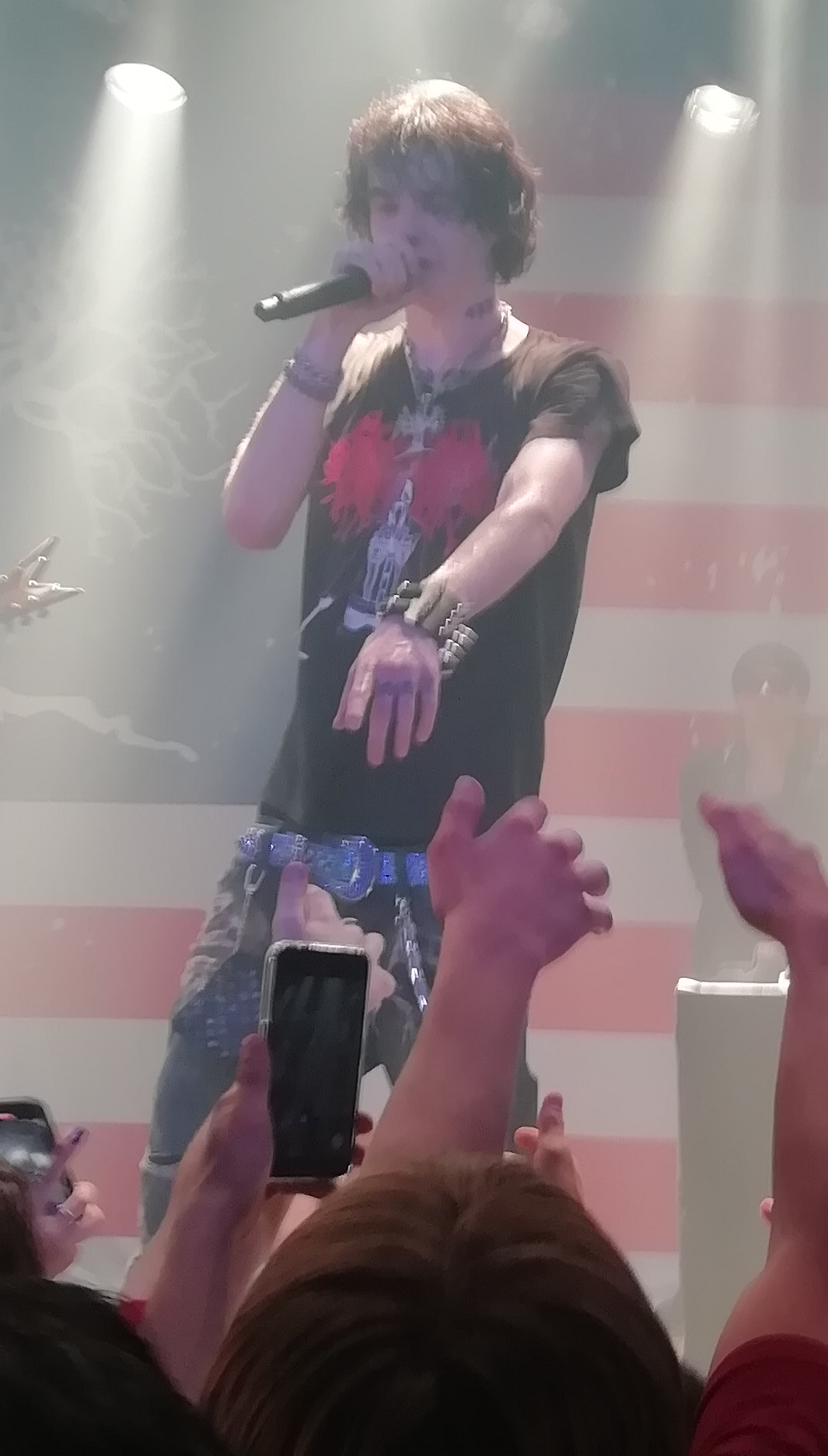
- Sematary performing in June 2024

Background information
- Born: Zane Brian Steckler; December 22, 2000 (age 25); California, U.S.
- Genres: Horrorcore; Witch House; Trap Metal
- Occupations: Rapper; songwriter; record producer
- Years active: 2019–present
- Member of: Haunted Mound

Zane Brian Steckler (born December 22, 2000), known professionally as Sematary, is an American rapper, songwriter, and record producer. He began releasing music and co-founded the Haunted Mound rap collective in 2019. Sematary has released nine mixtapes and three EPs. His distorted and overblown production style, which is influenced by witch house, black metal, and the deep-fried aesthetic have garnered him a cult following online.

== Early life ==
Zane Brian Steckler was born in Northern California on December 22, 2000. He was raised in Granite Bay, an outer suburb of Sacramento, and has described his hometown as "redneck-y". His mother is a painter and his father is a record producer who worked on various film scores, including writing a song for the soundtrack to the 1998 film Pokémon: The First Movie while working as a jingle writer. Steckler's upbringing, according to him, was "normal", and he has expressed that he hated school. He first began experimenting with music at the age of 11 through the use of GarageBand and Logic Pro.

== Career ==
Steckler began releasing music as Sematary in 2019, releasing his first song Mordor on March 22nd of that year. Following his graduation from high school, he would go on to release his collaborative debut mixtape, Grave House, with fellow rapper and childhood friend Ghost Mountain in August of that year. Sematary then released his solo debut mixtape, Rainbow Bridge, in November 2019. In 2019, Sematary and Ghost Mountain would also form the underground hip hop collective and record label, Haunted Mound, later adding more members such as Hackle, Anvil and the Irish producer–rapper duo Oscar18 and Buckshot, having met them through social media. In March 2020, he released the mixtape Rainbow Bridge 2 in continuation of his previous album. He also released a follow-up mixtape to Grave House with Ghost Mountain, Hundred Acre Wrist, in July 2020. His mixtape Rainbow Bridge 3 was released in April 2021, completing the Rainbow Bridge trilogy. It was listed as one of the best hip hop albums of that year by SLUG. In October of the same year, he released the mixtape Screaming Forest, which would begin a new era for Sematary and the rest of Haunted Mound as a whole.

Sematary released the mixtape Butcher House in January 2023, with a tour of the same name taking place following its release. Paste praised Butcher House as "easily the hardest-hitting rap record of the year right now", while Revolver's Eli Enis called it "beautifully belligerent". In September, Sematary released the EP King of the Graveyard. He also appeared as a guest on Suicideboys' Grey Day Tour in the fall of 2023.

His collaborative single "Fuck the World" with Chief Keef and fellow Haunted Mound member Hackle was released in January 2024. Later that month, Sematary released "Wendigo", a post-punk song, as a single for his album Bloody Angel, which was released in March 2024. His second headlining tour began one month later. In January 2025, Sematary released the single "Still Da Same" in collaboration with the rapper Xaviersobased. His single "Heart So Pure" was released the following month with the B-side "Oxycodone". Sematary executive produced Ghost Mountain's debut mixtape October Country, which was released in March 2025 and featured Sematary on the tracks "Highway Hex" and "Damien". His mixtape Haunt-O-Holixxx was released on Halloween in 2025.

== Artistry ==
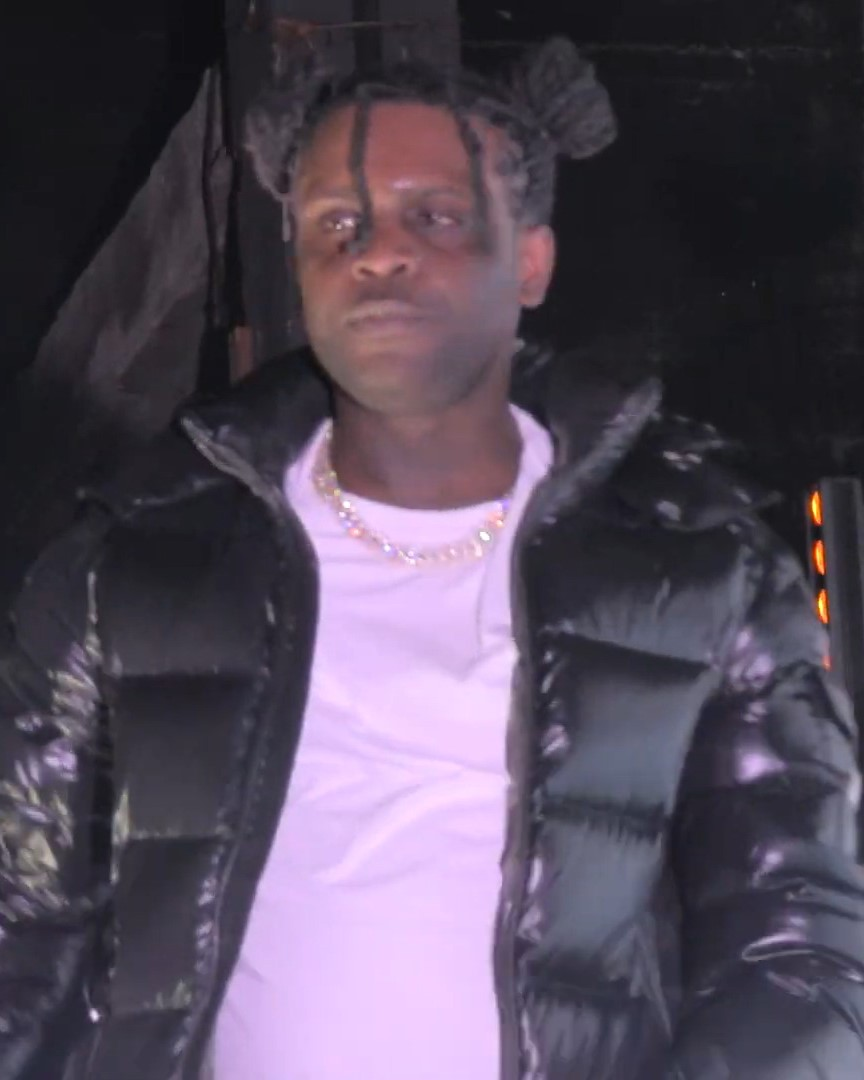
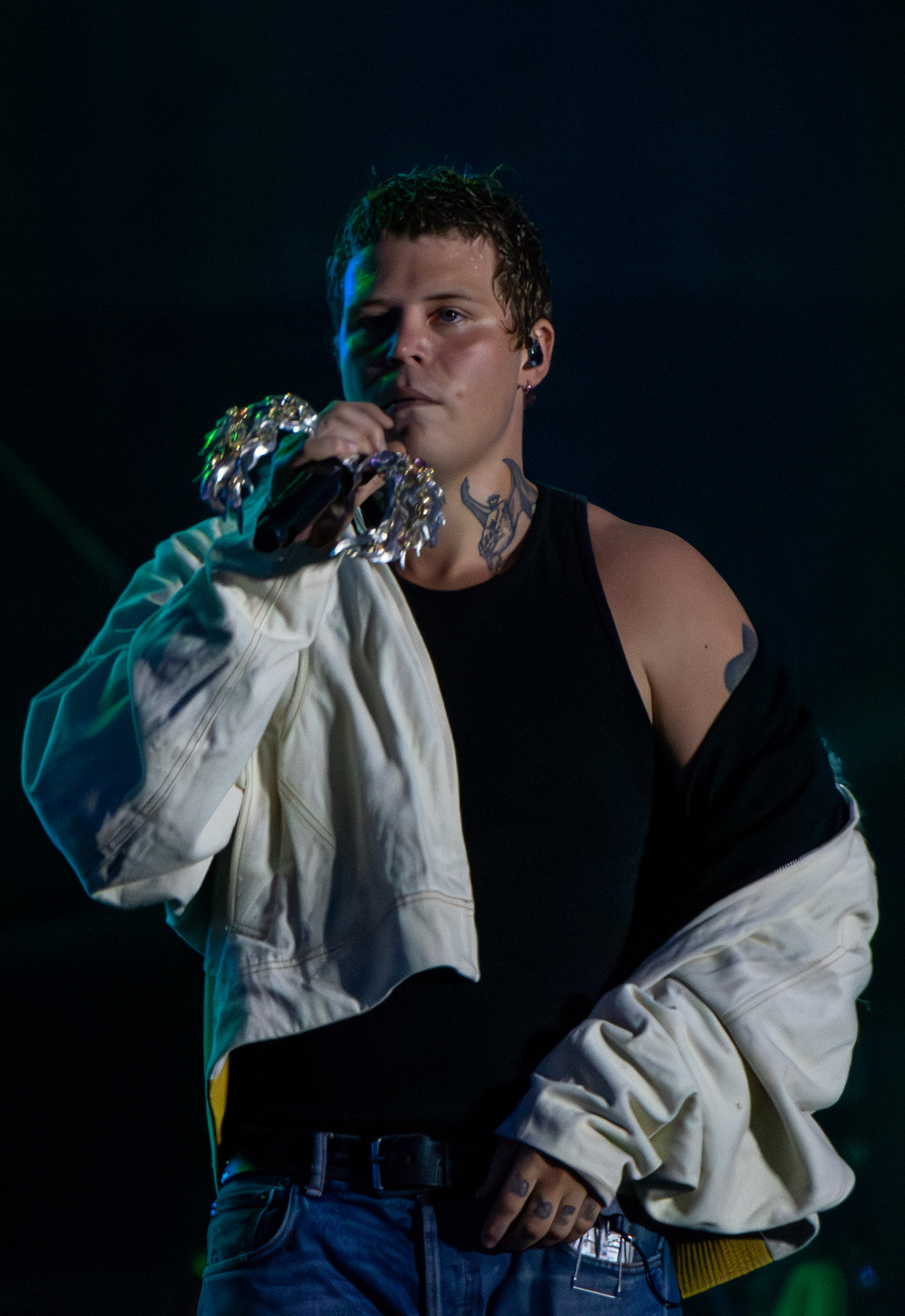
Sematary has named rappers Chief Keef (left) and Yung Lean as two of his biggest musical inspirations

Sematary was inspired by witch house band Salem and rappers Chief Keef, Black Kray, and Yung Lean to start rapping, with Yung Lean motivating him to pursue a career in music after he saw him perform at the Warlord American tour. Sematary's music is described as horrorcore with production largely inspired by witch house and samples depressive black metal tracks into the production, which is especially prevalent in the Rainbow Bridge series. His music is also heavily influenced from trap, cloud rap, and the Chicago drill sound. His vocals are typically layered and distorted with Auto-Tune and his instrumentals are often lo-fi. For Stereogum, John Norris called Sematary's vocals "snarling" and "slurry" and described his lyrics as nihilistic. Stereogum's Tom Breihan described his "sing-chant[ing]" as "baritone evilness" altered by "all kinds of disorienting digital-distortion techniques". Paste wrote that his music was "loud" and "abrasive" with "a ton of distortion" and lyrics that "vary from creepy to ridiculous". Paper's Ivan Guzman called his and Haunted Mound's lyrics "slasher film-esque" and their production style "blaring" and "blown-out". His sound was called "distinctly post-internet" and a "[fusion] of psychedelic SoundCloud-era rap à la Bladee and Yung Lean with menacing horrorcore drums and spooky witch house synths" by Eli Enis of Revolver.

As of 2024, Sematary had recorded a majority of his music in the "Butcher House", an abandoned slaughterhouse built in 1905. Günseli Yalcinkaya of Dazed compared his music videos to B horror movies. His online aesthetic has been described as deep-fried and defined by its horror influences, including his often holding a chainsaw; he has compared it to that of Chief Keef. Sematary helps design Haunted Mound's merchandise—which, as of 2024, make up most of the collective's revenue—and its mascot, a screaming tree named Harold. He has stated that his marketing of the group is inspired by that of other underground hip hop groups, such as Sad Boys and Goth Money. He has been vocal against the presence of the alt-right in underground hip hop.

== Discography ==
=== Mixtapes ===
List of mixtapes, with release date and label shown
Title	Details
Grave House (with Ghost Mountain)	Released: August 16, 2019; Re-Released: April 18, 2025; Label: Self-released (Re-Released under Haunted Mound); Format: Digital download, streaming, CD
Rainbow Bridge	Released: November 8, 2019; Label: Haunted Mound; Format: Digital download, streaming, CD
Rainbow Bridge 2	Released: March 20, 2020; Label: Haunted Mound; Format: Digital download, streaming, cassette
Hundred Acre Wrist Hosted by DJ Sorrow (with Ghost Mountain)	Released: July 31, 2020; Re-Released: April 18, 2025; Label: Haunted Mound; Format: Digital download, streaming, CD
Rainbow Bridge 3	Released: April 29, 2021; Label: Haunted Mound; Format: Digital download, streaming, cassette, CD
Screaming Forest	Released: October 29, 2021; Label: Haunted Mound; Format: Digital download, streaming, CD
Butcher House	Released: January 13, 2023; Label: Haunted Mound; Format: Digital download, streaming, CD
Bloody Angel	Released: March 29, 2024; Label: Haunted Mound; Format: Digital download, streaming, CD
Haunt-O-Holixxx: The Mixtape	Released: October 31, 2025.; Label: Haunted Mound; Format: Digital download, streaming, CD

=== Extended plays ===
List of extended plays, with release date and label shown
Title	Details
Warboy	Released: May 1, 2020; Label: Haunted Mound; Format: Digital download, streaming, CD
King of the Graveyard	Released: September 29, 2023; Label: Haunted Mound; Format: Digital download, streaming
The Wagoner EP (with Ghost Mountain)	Released: April 11, 2025; Label: Haunted Mound; Format: Digital download, streaming; Note: Its songs were originally released as standalone uploads and leaks in 2020, but were not officially released as its own EP until 2025.
