= Bleood =

American rapper and record producer (born 2005)

- Bleood in 2026

Background information
- Also known as: Deffici1e; M4ri
- Born: Jamari Isiaha Spencer-Brown; March 17, 2005 (age 21); Florida, U.S.
- Genre: Rage
- Occupations: Musician; rapper; singer; record producer
- Years active: 2020–present
- Label: Lost Chapel Records
- Member of: LNF, #back
- Formerly of: 1c34
- Website: bleood.online

Jamari Isiaha Spencer-Brown (born March 17, 2005), known professionally as Bleood (stylized in all lowercase), is an American rapper and record producer. He initially emerged as a member of New York City rapper Xaviersobased's collective 1c34.

A member of the rage scene, Bleood was labeled as one of the "32 coolest artists of 2026 (so far)" by The Fader, and his song "Alucard" was featured on Pitchfork's weekly list of "10 to Hear".

== Career ==
Bleood initially emerged as an artist under the alias "M4ri", later becoming a member of New York City rapper Xaviersobased's collective 1c34 under the alias "Deffici1e". He later formed the group #back (also known as "Backphobic") with rapper Yuke.

Bleood released his second mixtape, Pain on March 11, 2025, later followed by his third mixtape, Rascal 51.

On May 10, 2026, Bleood made his Rolling Loud debut at Orlando, Florida. On May 4, 2026, Bleood surprise-released his third mixtape, Protagonist. Subsequently, Bleood announced his Protagonist Tour. The Fader's Tobias Hess featured Bleood in a list of the "32 coolest artists of 2026 (so far)", writing: "[Bleood's] surprise release mixtape Protagonist has made him into one of the underground's main characters." Bleood made his debut at Summer Smash 2026 on June 12, 2026. On October 30, 2026, he released his debut studio album, Kill Your Idols.

== Influences and musical style ==
Bleood's music falls under the rage category, which contains heavy vocal manipulations, heavy bass, distorted beats, and enveloping synths. According to Alexander Cole of HotNewHipHop, Bleood's music falls in the same lines as 2Slimey and Edward Skeletrix. Writing for The Fader, Vivian Medithi described his music as "essentially rage rap with everything turned up to 11, tapping producer Yrsci to give him vicious instrumentals with brutalizing 808s". Lyrically, Bleood often raps about drinking lean.

== Personal life ==
On July 10, 2026, Bleood's Mar Vista home was robbed by a group of armed men, with approximately $200,000 worth of clothes, jewelry, and electronics being stolen. During the robbery, one man inside the home was shot and killed; however, the identities of the victim and the other occupants held inside the home have not yet been released by authorities.

== Discography ==
=== Studio albums ===
Title	Album details
Pain	Released: March 11, 2025; Label: Self-released; Format: Streaming
Rascal 51	Released: October 24, 2025; Label: Self-released; Format: Streaming
Kill Your Idols	Released: October 30, 2026; Label: Last Chapel; Format: Vinyl, CD, streaming

=== Mixtapes ===
Title	Album details
Seal of Memories (as Deffici1e)	Released: November 6, 2023; Label: Self-released; Format: Streaming
Protagonist	Released: May 14, 2026; Label: Last Chapel; Format: Streaming

=== Extended plays ===
Title	Album details
Backology (as m4ri)	Released: November 14, 2022; Label: Self-released; Format: Streaming
#Fear	Released: 2023; Label: Self-released; Format: Streaming
Air Gear with St47ic	Released: February 26, 2023; Label: Self-released; Format: Streaming
Ewwwww.co	Released: March 26, 2023; Label: Self-released; Format: Streaming
You Dont Need Your Skin	Released: May 10, 2024; Label: Self-released; Format: Streaming
How Bleood Stole Xmas	Released: December 25, 2025; Label: Self-released; Format: Streaming
Kill or B Killd	Released: April 13, 2026; Label: Self-released; Formal: Streaming
Haunted Hills	Released: September 11, 2026; Label: Last Chapel; Format: Streaming
