= AgusFortnite2008 =

Argentine rapper (born 2008)

- Born: Agustín Juan Gómez; May 4, 2004 (age 22); Buenos Aires, Argentina
- Genre: Plugg
- Occupations: Rapper; record producer
- Years active: 2021–present
- Member of: SwaggerBoyz, P.I.L.F.

Agustín Juan Gómez (born May 4, 2004), known professionally as AgusFortnite2008, is an Argentine rapper and record producer from Buenos Aires, Argentina. He is the co-founder of the collective SwaggerBoyz with fellow rapper and producer Stiffy. The duo have been described as spearheading the Argentine underground rap scene.

In 2024, he released the mixtape Murio La Musica with Stiffy which was ranked number 22 on Rolling Stone magazine's list of "The 50 Best Latin Albums of 2024".

== Early life ==
Agustín Juan Gómez was born in Buenos Aires, Argentina. He grew up in Merlo, Buenos Aires.

== Career ==
In 2020, Agusfortnite2008 met Stiffy online through playing the video game Minecraft. They formed the duo SwaggerBoyz later that year inspired by the work of American rapper Chief Keef, shitpost culture and Internet montage parodies. The pair released songs such as "Jesus escucha plug", and later incorporated Argentine references. The pair began an annual festival known as Swaggerpalooza where they met artists turrobaby and Zell and formed the group P.I.L.F. That same year, Agusfortnite2008 released the mixtape Hacelos concha Agus. In 2025, Agusfortnite2008, alongside Stiffy, performed at the Axe Festival Ceremonia in Mexico City.

== Musical style and artistry ==
Writing for Rolling Stone, Reanna Cruz compared Agusfortnite2008's sound to Xaviersobased and Tisakorean. Cruz noted his music as rejecting previous Argentine hip-hop and music traditions, stating on the song "24/7": "No se que mierda es el boom bap, pero suena como el orto [I don't know what the fuck boom bap is, but it sounds like ass]". Agusfortnite2008 described himself as a parody of the modern hip-hop artist.

== Discography ==
=== Albums ===
Title	Album details
Fanclub de Agus	Released: 2022; Label: Self-released; Format: Digital download, streaming
Plug Park	Released: 2022; Collaborators: AgusFortnite2008 & Stiffy; Label: Self-released; Format: Digital download, streaming
Bobajiztan	Released: 2023; Label: Self-released; Format: Digital download, streaming
Murio la musica	Released: 2024; Collaborators: AgusFortnite2008 & Stiffy; Label: Self-released / Dale Play; Format: Digital download, streaming
P.I.L.F	Released: 2025; Collaborators: PILF; Label: Dale Play; Format: Digital download, streaming
Perdiendo Rasgos Adolescentes	Released: 2026; Collaborators: Swaggerboyz; Label: Self-released / Dale Play; Format: Digital download, streaming

=== Mixtapes ===
Title	Mixtape details
Hacelos concha Agus	Released: 2024; Label: Self-released; Format: Digital download, streaming

=== EPs ===
Title	EP details
Popstar #1 de la Internet	Released: 2021; Label: Self-released; Format: Digital download, streaming
