= Plugg =

Subgenre of trap music

- Other names: Plugg music; Plug
- Stylistic origins: Trap; jazz; new age; video game music; SoundCloud rap
- Cultural origins: Early 2010s, United States
- Typical instruments: Vocals; DAW (FL Studio)
- Derivative forms: Rage; jerk; digicore; sigilkore

Subgenres
- Diary; Asian rock; dark plugg; terror plugg

Fusion genres
- PluggnB; hyperplugg; ambient plugg

Plugg is a subgenre of trap music that emerged in the mid-2010s via online distribution on the SoundCloud platform. It was popularized by melodic Southern hip hop artists, and is characterized by deep 808 basslines, sparkly melodies, and melodic vocals.

Unlike mainstream trap, which is defined by bombastic production and rattling hi-hat drum patterns, plugg is said to be dreamy, laidback, atmospheric, spacey, airy, and minimal. The genre is also described as having an overall lush and jazzy atmosphere; ethereal, luscious multi-instrumental harmonies and melodies; sparse, disjointed, and relaxed drum programming with few hi-hats; and thick basslines. Instead of the hi-hats in mainstream trap, plugg beats mainly employ beat skips, crash cymbals, and punctuated accent snares on half-beats. As described by a critic, plugg is best intended to be heard alone, "experience[d] .. [in] the way it's intended: as a day-long trance in your isolated abode".

Vocally, plugg ranges from instrumental beats without vocals, to songs with either rapping or mellow singing. Rapping flows used in plugg range from aggressive to relaxed and mellow.

== Etymology ==
The genre derives its name from the "Plug!" producer tag on SoundCloud used by the members of the BeatPluggz collective since 2013. MexikoDro of the Beatpluggz collective claimed that fellow collective member StoopidXool or someone else from Beatpluggz recorded the vocals for the tag. At first, the tag used the word "Plugs", but they later shortened it to "Plug". Both variants "plugg" and "plug" are used to describe the genre. Other names for the genre include descriptive terms such as "new wave" and "smooth jazz" (not to be confused with new wave and smooth jazz genres).

== Characteristics ==
Plugg music is typified by the production style of Beatpluggz, originated by MexikoDro. According to CashCache, "simple chords, hard-hitting 808s and repetitive, thoughtful, addictive melodies" typify plugg music. According to trap producer Popstar Benny, the foundation of plugg is "Zaytoven['s] 'street' Atlanta drums, and melodies, [which are] ... a little more 'internet' and little more "videogamey".

=== 808s and drumming ===
Multiple sources pinpoint the foundation of plugg drumming to Zaytoven's percussion style and samples. Zaytoven's percussion style was influenced by West Coast hip hop of the late 1990s. Many drum samples used by Zaytoven were provided to him by his beatmaking mentor, JT the Bigga Figga, and have continued to be used by him ever since.

Zaytoven's drum technique has been described as sparse, bouncy and swinging. The sparse style of production served the purpose of freeing up acoustic space for the rapper's presence. Zaytoven's beats are primarily centered around heavy 808 bass notes, and, as Zaytoven put it himself,

As long as the 808 was nice and bumping, everything else was just extra to me. It's almost like icing on the cake

— Zaytoven

Zaytoven credits the swinging feel of his typical rhythms to the MPC2000 hardware sampler, which he has used throughout his career.

808 bass notes used in plugg have been described variously as thick, hard, steady, bumping and deep.

Zaytoven's drumming is inherently polyrhythmical. Second to the 808 bass notes is usually a clap falling on every 2nd and 4th pulse in a measure. Another rhythmic line is usually added by several sparse lines of hi-hats, which only mark every 8th note and otherwise come and go in dense, occasional clumps. The next percussive line is formed by occasional ornamental accented snares. Zaytoven also usually employs various additional percussive elements in his rhythms, such as occasional vocal "ahh" samples, bongos, shakers (the so-called "Zaytoven shaker"), and so on, and according to Zaytoven, many of the later beatmakers mainly tried to emulate his drumming by re-using his percussive drum sounds. The complete rhythm usually employs several minor variations throughout the song; and it might be turned on and off throughout the song, creating "beat cuts" or "beat skips".

=== Chords and melodies ===
Plugg music is characterized by its distinctive melodies, which often draw inspiration from retro Nintendo-style video game sounds. These melodies are typically multi-layered and feature heavy use of lush chords, xylophone tones, and soft synthesizer presets, such as synth pads. The drum programming in plugg music tends to be sparse, with frequent use of crash cymbals, TR-808 rimshots, maracas, accent snares, and occasional hi-hats. Instead of traditional kick drums, producers often rely on 808s. Claps in plugg beats are usually heavily low-pass filtered and muffled, serving as a substitute for conventional snares.

==== Production influences and evolution ====
Plugg production evolved from the style popularized by Zaytoven, who was known for incorporating piano and organ riffs alongside minimal drum arrangements. Beatpluggz, a prominent production collective, retained the minimalist and airy tone of Zaytoven's style while shifting the emphasis from organic instruments to synthetic sounds. They also expanded the rhythmic elements by introducing a wider variety of hi-hats, snares, and other percussion samples. Additionally, the 808s used in Beatpluggz-style production are generally harder and more prominent than those in Zaytoven's beats.

==== Other characteristics ====
One defining feature of plugg music is the use of the "Plug!" vocal sample, which originated as a producer tag for the Beatpluggz collective. Over time, this tag became widely adopted by producers influenced by the Beatpluggz style, even those unaffiliated with the collective.

Vocally, plugg performers employ a range of styles, including aggressive and mellow rapping, whispering flows, DMV-style delivery, and melodic singing.

==== Production techniques and tutorials ====
Plugg beats are often created quickly and are considered relatively easy to replicate. Numerous tutorials on YouTube claim to teach producers how to create plugg beats in as little as six minutes. Before the rise of these tutorials, MexikoDro, a notable figure in the plugg scene, stated in an interview that he typically spends about 15 minutes on a beat—10 minutes for production and five minutes for mixing and mastering. Similarly, Zaytoven was known to complete beats within 5 to 10 minutes.

== History ==
=== Early 2010s: Origins ===
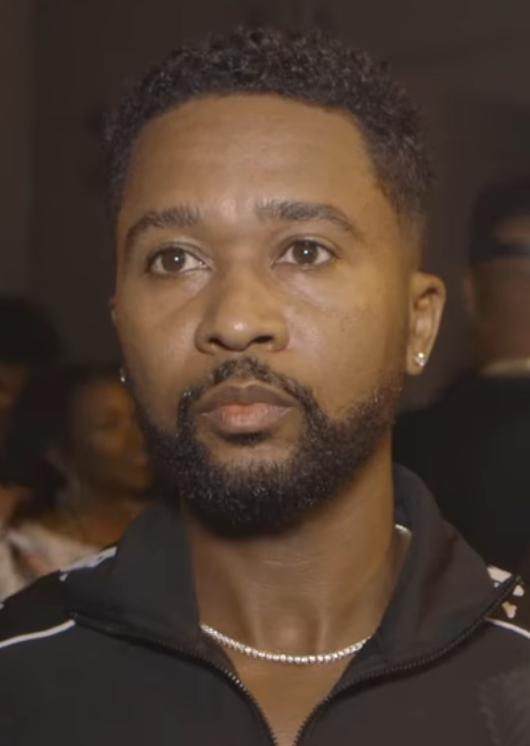
Zaytoven, whose beats heavily influenced the emergence of plugg music

The origins of plugg music are traced to the gospel and soul-influenced production style of Zaytoven, and other southern rap influences, such as OutKast, as well as to a loosely related subgenre of hip-hop called Chicago bop, which is a euphoric, fast-paced subgenre of drill music. Plugg first emerged around 2013 as a cohesive production style of the collective called Beatpluggz including Atlanta-based producers MexikoDro and StoopidXool. Plugg was inspired by Zaytoven, Project Pat, Juicy J, Gucci Mane, the snap rap group D4L, and the Paper Mario Nintendo soundtrack. MexikoDro and his fellow Beatpluggz members gained viewership via the SoundCloud platform, where plugg picked up an underground following. Plugg has been described as "near-ambient and intoxicating", a strong departure from the popular styles of the day.

From around 2014 on, rappers like Playboi Carti, Rich the Kid, Diego Money, Kodak Black, Lil Yachty, Famous Dex, Yung Bans, Thouxanbanfauni, D Savage, and Reese LaFlare brought mainstream attention to plugg for the first time by working with Beatpluggz and releasing tracks such as "Broke Boi" (by Playboi Carti), "Plug" (by Rich the Kid, Playboi Carti and Kodak Black), "Hella O's" (by Lil Yachty), "New Wave" (by Rich the Kid and Famous Dex), "Harrassin Me" (by Kodak Black and Humble Haitian), "Dresser" (by Yung Bans), and "No Cap" (by Yung Bans and Reese LaFlare). Around the same time, rapper Nebu Kiniza recorded his viral hit single "Gassed Up" (later certified platinum) over the same plugg beat that was used in "Plug!" by Rich the Kid. Among them, Carti was the first one to appreciate the production style of Beatpluggz, and also recorded other plugg records, such as "Money Counter", "Don't Tell Nobody", "Smash Pt.2" and "Chill Freestyle", around that time. Despite "Broke Boi" being his breakthrough hit, Playboi Carti never actually paid back to MexikoDro for these plugg beats, as MexikoDro later claimed in interviews. Whether or not Rich the Kid paid for the beat for his "Plug!" song, which was one of the biggest plugg hits of the day, also remains uncertain.

During the first wave, plugg beats, mainly made by Beatpluggz, also helped to shape the careers of UnoTheActivist, Thouxanbanfauni, and Yung Gleesh.

The first mainstream wave of plugg was mainly a fad and quickly faded away as the rappers (Famous Dex, Rich the Kid, Lil Yachty) moved on to work with other producers. Playboi Carti had a creative break-up with MexikoDro, which was described as "ugly", and moved on to work with Pi'erre Bourne, who wasn't making plugg. Despite the aforementioned developments, in the underground during that time, plugg maintained a consistent following and continued to evolve, mostly due to the online-centric nature of the subgenre.

=== Late 2010s–2020s: Pluggnb scene ===
The new wave of plugg started in 2017–2020 and stemmed mainly from several sources. First, a new style of plugg emerged, called pluggnb, which combined plugg production with melodic, dreamy contemporary R&B synths. Among the originators of this new style were XanGang, producer collective Surreal Gang, producers CashCache, Dylvinci, and various rappers, such as rapper-producer Corey Lingo, rapper Lil Shine, rapper-producer Neiburr, Weiland, and the now-defunct artistic collective known as SlayWorld, whose roster included some of the names most associated with the pluggnb scene, such as rappers Summrs, Autumn! and Kankan.

At the same time, a new wave of primarily plugg-oriented rappers emerged, many of whom grew up listening to plugg, including BoofPaxkMooky, who has been rapping since the early era of plugg and whose 2021 mixtape produced by StoopidXool called "Four Seasons" was regarded as one of plugg's purest, according to a critic; Tony Shhnow, described as the one bringing the influence of the 1990s R&B and earlier Southern hip-hop into plugg; 10kdunkin and others. A new pleiad of plugg producers also emerged closer to 2020, most notable of them being CashCache and Cash Cobain. CashCache was described as a "primary architect" of the plugg sound used by Mooky, Shhnow, and 10kdunkin. He is also regarded as the person bringing more lounge music and more jazz influences in plugg, making a style of plugg dubbed "sleepy plugg".

Around that time in 2020, StoopidXool and Cash Cobain collaborated on an album with a New York City plugg rapper FLEE, and that release included the viral pluggnb hit "SWISH / USE 2" recorded in collaboration with Brent Faiyaz.

While BoofPaxkMooky, Tony Shhnow, 10kdunkin, and FLEE were described as "bringing the most true-to-the-form plug back" into rotation, Lil Tecca, Autumn!, SSGKobe, and SoFaygo helped to popularize the pluggnb sound by releasing TikTok hits "Show Me Up", "Knock Knock", and "Thrax", respectively.

At the same time, new names kept entering the scene: Summrs and Autumn! brought in influences from the sound typical for "SadBoys" led by Yung Lean into plugg, while other noted new names in the genre included Ka$hdami, 1600J and RewindRaps, tana, among others.

At the same time, plugg gained attention from Drake. Drake first recorded a song called "Plug" on a plugg beat around 2017, allegedly for his Scorpion album, but the song was later removed from the tracklist and only resurfaced online in 2020. Later, also in 2020, Drake included a plugg track produced by MexikoDro titled "From Florida with Love" on his Dark Lane Demo Tapes mixtape. The purported reason for the inclusion of a plugg song in the tracklist was speculated to be the second wave of underground plugg that Drake was aware of.

In 2021, rapper RXK Nephew released over 400 songs, some of which were described as "pluggnb."

In 2022, Atlanta artist Glokk40Spaz started gaining attention for his hardcore plugg rap style. This style had emerged in the DMV area, where it was given the name dark plugg. Standing in contrast to the dreamy and melodic atmosphere of plugg, dark plugg (also known as DMV plugg and evil plugg) emphasizes an ominous and aggressive sound, with widespread use of the DMV flow.

== Related genres ==
=== Hyperplugg ===
By the end of 2021, the plugg sound was flourishing and developing further, with multiple artists starting to add more digicore influences into their sound, a genre which drew from plugg music; examples of this being Daesworld's "2003" and Jaydes' "Highschool".

In 2022, the hyperplugg microgenre began trending on SoundCloud and TikTok, when producer-artist Myspacemark started adding influences of hyperpop into his plugg sound, to the point of claiming to have invented the "hyperplugg" subgenre. It was unclear whether the subgenre was intended as an ironic meme or not, but after videos on the microgenre amassed tens of thousands of views on TikTok, many fans of Myspacemark took the idea more seriously.

=== Ambient plugg ===
Ambient plugg is a microgenre blending plugg percussion with atmospheric textures, glitchy ad-libs, and meditative synths. Pioneered in the late 2010s by artists like Izaya Tiji, the style emphasizes mood and texture over lyricism, creating soft, surreal soundscapes. It later gained traction through collectives like Shed Theory and artists like Babyxsosa.

=== Terror plugg ===
Terror plugg (also known as extremo-plugg) is a microgenre of plugg characterized by its use of distorted 808s, eerie melodies, and intense vocal delivery, originally pioneered by producers and rappers Squillo, tdf, marrgielaa, and boolymon. Due to unconventional 808 production, terror plugg experienced a wave of online virality between 2024 and 2025 through internet memes on TikTok and Instagram.

Music journalist Kieran Press-Reynolds credited New York rapper Yuke's 2024 single "ian goin" as "the logical excruciating endpoint of the 'terror plugg' style". Notable artists include boolymon, Lazer Dim 700, tdf, marrgielaa, Squillo, twovrt, and savage.

=== Asian rock ===
Asian rock is a microgenre of pluggnB music pioneered by producer BenjiCold. Writing for Pitchfork, music critic Jude Noel described the style as a "guitar-laden pluggnb style".

=== Diary ===
Diary (also known as diary plugg) is a microgenre of pluggnB, named after the visual iconography associated with the Vampire Diaries and Twilight Saga, coined by rapper kynlary who formed the Twilight collective. The style is characterized by layered and melodic production, pitched-up vocals, and sing-rapping.

== Regional scenes ==
Apart from the United States, by the mid-2010s to the early 2020s, plugg took root in Europe, particularly in France and the post-Soviet countries, where local plugg scenes were formed thanks to skate videos, fashion trends and the growing popularity of hip-hop music.

=== France ===
Parisian rapper Serane first learned about plugg after listening to "Broke Boi" by Playboi Carti and formed a crew of designers and artists, who developed the local aesthetic of mixing plugg sounds with their reverence for Japanese designer clothes. The crew of Serane, dubbed "#OneTruePath", was noted as somewhat similar to Yung Lean and his SadBoys crew from Sweden, who were also largely influenced by imported American hip-hop subgenres during their time.

To Serane's surprise, Atlanta plugg producers were supportive of his crew's efforts. After he collaborated with various American plugg artists, including rappers ATL Smook, BeezyB, 10kdunkin, Tony Shhnow, and Dylvinci, and producers CashCache, MexikoDro, and StoopidXool themselves contacted him and offered to collaborate on music.

At the same time, Serane met a great deal of criticism at home in France, where, in a musical environment dominated by aggressive UK drill, he was often dismissed as trash, mainly for his "off-beat" flow.

Besides Serane, other French plugg artists include rappers Southlove, Kasper!, Prince K., Yuri Online (all belonging to #OneTruePath), 8Ruki, and Lil Sandal, and producers TTDafool, Voidd, Chenfol (also from #OneTruePath), and others Of them, Chenfol (also variably spelled Chenpol) is described as the originator of the plugg sound in France.

=== Russia and post-Soviet countries ===
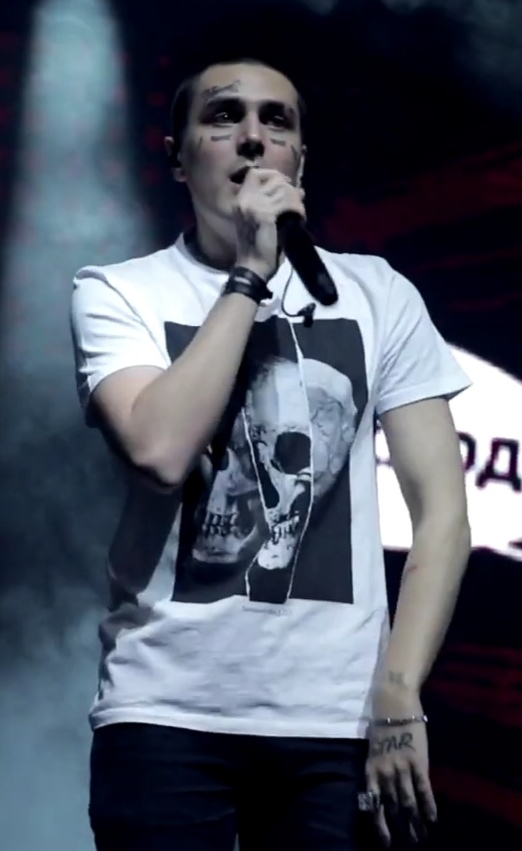
Face, early plugg pioneer in Russia

Plugg would be dubbed as "minimalistic trap" in Runet, a Russian-language internet community. Face is commonly cited as the first rapper from Russia to start rapping over plugg beats in 2016, with songs such as "Кот" ("Cat") (produced by MexikoDro), "Vans" (produced by MexikoDro), and the "Revenge EP" (2017). Boulevard Depo was another early proponent of plugg in Russia, with songs such as "Проснись и пеки" ("Wake and Bake") and "Rare First Basement" (both produced by FrozenGangBeatz in 2016), "Burnout", and "Snake In The Snacks" (both produced by NastyBoy Boo in 2018).

Big Baby Tape was also among the first rappers from Russia to put plugg into the spotlight, with the release of his debut EP, "Hoodrich Tales", in 2018, which he described as having "the essence of plugg music".

In Ukraine, plugg was pioneered by the 044 KLAN music collective, particularly by rappers 044 ROSE and 044 yakata.

Rocket, another Russian rapper, further popularized plugg in Russia with his "Supreme Swings" EP in 2020.

=== Argentina ===
Some artists such as AgusFortnite2008 and Stiffy of the hip-hop group SwaggerBoyz have developed a regional variant of plugg, referencing series such as South Park, as well as outdated internet memes.

== See also ==
- Cloud rap – an earlier, similarly atmospheric and relaxed subgenre of rap.
- Internet rap – an online-based subgenre of hip-hop
