= Autumn (rapper) =

American rapper (born 1997)

Autumn!
- Also known as: Autumar Wick, Wick, TrapGodBenji, Lil Autumn, Twinuzis
- Born: Benjamin Clarence Phillips Jr. June 24, 1997 (age 29); Lafayette, Louisiana, U.S.
- Genres: Hip hop; trap; pluggnb; R&B
- Occupations: Rapper; songwriter; record producer
- Years active: 2017–present
- Labels: Victor Victor; Casablanca; Republic
- Formerly of: HellWorld, SlayWorld

Benjamin Clarence Phillips Jr. (born June 24, 1997), known professionally as Autumn (stylized as Autumn!), formerly TrapGodBenji, is an American rapper and record producer. He is best known for popularizing the hip hop microgenre pluggnb, alongside rappers Summrs, and Texas rapper Kankan.

== Early and personal life ==
Benjamin Clarence Phillips Jr. was born in Lafayette, Louisiana, where he grew up in poverty. He lived with his grandmother, great-grandfather, siblings, and cousins in a crowded house until he was five. He attended Lafayette High School and graduated in 2015.

In a 2022 interview, Phillips revealed that he had gone to college for a brief period of time before dropping out.

Phillips's dating life has stayed mostly under the radar; however, in 2020, he was in a public relationship with fellow rapper Bktherula.

In 2020–2021, Phillips was close with his music collective SlayWorld, featuring artists like Summrs, a friend of Philips before Slayworld; Kankan, a Texas rapper he later fell out with; and Goonie, founder of SlayWorld.

Phillips does vlogs on YouTube under the name "Ibecrashingalot". Phillips is close with his manager Saweb and fellow Atlanta vlogger Quan.

== Career ==
Phillips played the trumpet and piano from a young age. At age 11, Phillips began producing music on the program Mixcraft to impress his older brother, who also made music. He donned the name "TrapGodBenji" and the producer name "TwinUzis".

Phillips met fellow Lafayette rapper Summrs online, at the time known as "LouisVeeDee". He later encouraged Phillips to start rapping as well, which is when he donned the name "Autumn!" and started rapping with Summrs.

He quit his job at Walmart to focus on his music career in late 2017. Phillips has stated that his focus is not on material possessions but on the feeling of achievement from his career.

Phillips consistently released music from late 2017 through 2018, including albums L$D, ##Retribution, ##R3 ##R3 and multiple others. Phillips broke through in mid-2019, when the song "Nina!" went viral on social media platform TikTok. Phillips reportedly made it as a filler song to one of his albums. During this time, he was part of the collectives HellWorld and later SlayWorld.

In 2020, Phillips released albums Solitary and Ils Verront, alongside multiple EPs and singles such as "Comedy!" and "Still the Same!".

In 2021, Phillips signed with Victor Victor Worldwide and released the album Golden Child: Chapter 1. Additionally, he released the EP Not Much Left, with two out of the three songs featuring frequent collaborator Summrs.

In 2022, Phillips released albums Antagonist and Golden Child: Chapter 2. At the end of the year he dropped the EP ##B4GC3 ##B4GC3, followed by Golden Child: Chapter 3 in early 2023. This was his biggest album to date, and serves as a coming-of-age album, featuring multiple sounds from his career. Phillips released Midnight Club in late 2023, which moved away from pluggnb.

In 2024, Phillips' career slowed down slightly, releasing albums Solitary 2 and You Never Was Mine. In 2025, Phillips released the album B2MR, an album attempting to go back to his old sound, receiving little buzz online; and Rolling Stone, a well-received album.

== Discography ==
=== Studio albums ===
Title	Album details
Antagonist! (Deluxe)	Released: April 29, 2022; Label: Victor Victor, Casablanca; Format: Digital download, streaming
Golden Child: Chapter 3	Released: March 31, 2023; Label: Self-released; Format: Digital download, streaming
Midnight Club	Released: August 22, 2023; Label: Self-released; Format: Digital download, streaming
Midnight Club: Dub Edition	Released: October 5, 2023; Label: Self-released; Format: Digital download, streaming
Solitary 2	Released: April 16, 2024; Label: Self-released, 10K Projects; Format: Digital download, streaming
You Never Was Mine	Released: June 12, 2024; Label: Self-released, 10K Projects; Format: Digital download, streaming
B2MR	Released: March 31, 2025; Label: Self-released, 10K Projects; Format: Digital download, streaming
Rolling Stone	Released: October 10, 2025"Rolling Stone – Album by Autumn!". Spotify.; Label: 10K Projects; Format: Digital download, streaming

=== Mixtapes ===
List of mixtapes, with selected details
Title	EP details
4	Released: October 19, 2019; Label: Self-released; Format: Digital download, streaming
Ils Verront	Released: August 26, 2020; Label: Self-released; Format: Digital download, streaming
Solitary	Released: December 2, 2020; Label: Self-released; Format: Digital download, streaming
Golden Child: Chapter 1	Released: June 12, 2021; Label: Self-released; Format: Digital download, streaming
Golden Child: Chapter 2	Released: August 26, 2022; Label: Victor Victor, Casablanca; Format: Digital download, streaming

=== Extended Plays ===
List of extended plays, with selected details
Title	Album details
Happy Birthday	Released: June 25, 2017
2 Seasons (with Summrs)	Released: July 17, 2017
Autumn	Released: July 19, 2017
2 Seasons II (with Summrs)	Released: October 16, 2017
BuggaWRLD	Released: January 7, 2018
#Don'tForgetMe #I'mStillHere	Released: February 2, 2018
L.S.D.	Released: May 20, 2018
##Retribution	Released: October 2, 2018
##R2 ##R2	Released: October 25, 2018
##B4R3 ##B4R3	Released: November 10, 2018
##R3 ##R3	Released: November 29, 2018
Opiates!	Released: December 10, 2018
Modern Day Michelangelo	Released: February 22, 2019
##B4R4 ##B4R4	Released: August 6, 2019
Wick & Clancy: 2S3 Vol. 1 (with Summrs)	Released: August 24, 2019
5303	Released: December 2, 2018
WICK!	Released: December 13, 2019
#Hollywood	Released: February 22, 2020
Ep TwinSwiper (with SeptembersRich)	Released: May 23, 2020
Simp Music <3	Released: February 14, 2021
Exactly	Released: April 9, 2021
Not Much Longer	Released: August 11, 2021
Not Much Left	Released: September 10, 2021
##B4GC2 ##B4GC2	Released: July 28, 2022
##B4GC3 ##B4GC3	Released: January 20, 2023
##B4B2MR	Released: December 12, 2024
KICKOFF	Released: February 19, 2026
