= Xang =

Musical artist (born 2000)

- Also known as: xang.dpm, Noutxxhang, xxhang, souljaswitme
- Born: Roy Ngamy Noutchang; September 20, 2000 (age 26); Montgomery County, Maryland, U.S.
- Genre: Ambient trap
- Occupations: Singer; songwriter; rapper
- Years active: 2020–present
- Member of: DPM

Roy Ngamy Noutchang (born September 20, 2000), known professionally as Xang, is a Cameroonian-American rapper from Montgomery County, Maryland. He is known for pioneering the ambient trap genre and founding the collective DPM (Deep and Powerful Music).

Xang's contributions to the music scene have been positively acclaimed by media sites such as Pitchfork and The Fader. In 2025, Xang was labeled as one of the "30 coolest artists of the year" by the latter.

== Early life ==
Roy Ngamy Noutchang was born on September 20, 2000, to Cameroonian parents in Montgomery County, Maryland. Growing up, Noutchang played soccer and grew up listening to artists such as Michael Jackson and 50 Cent. His father died from colon cancer in 2021.

== Career ==
Noutchang began taking music seriously in 2020, after he graduated from high school, and was introduced to ambient trap by fellow Maryland producer and rapper, Theo. Following high school, Noutchang chose not to go to college to focus on music. Noutchang's earliest releases were dated to 2020 when he was under the alias xxhang, since he started rapping, but he didn't receive notable attention until 2023, with the release of his EPs, guerilla tactics, the angels floss their teeth with my bones, and Exile, with Moh Baretta, which were helping solidify Noutchang's sound. According to Noutchang with The Fader, he stated, "over the years ambient trap turned into something you can go on a run to, something you can dance to.”

In March 2025, Noutchang released Watch Over My Body (stylized as WOMB). Upon its release, the project received critical acclaim; Olivier Lafontant of Pitchfork rated the album a 7.3/10, writing how the project is a clear distillation of Noutchang's vision since his emergence in 2021. He also wrote how his haziness of ambient textures, uncanny rhythms, paired with his insular and atmospheric struggle rap, makes Noutchang sound alien. According to Jordan Darvile of The Fader, it was one of the " most sonically vibrant projects" of 2025. The project was a breakthrough for both Noutchang and DPM’s ambient rap movement, with its new avant-garde style of music.

In April 2026, Noutchang released GroakDontCroak Vol.1. Like his previous works, the project was critically acclaimed. Lafontant rated the album a 7.7/10; according to him, the project retreads WOMB, but its impact is heavier. He praised the project's creativity, writing how "eye popping" and "refreshing" the sound is. In a different article, Lafontant wrote how Noutchang's "murky cadence often bleeds into vampiric haze and distortion, but the overlapping punch-ins come naturally to him."

== Musical style and artistry ==
Noutchang, a member of the DMV hip-hop scene, is also widely considered to be a pioneer of the genre ambient trap, a blend of the cloud rap genre. Him and his collective's style is considered avant-garde of the style that they are defining.

== Reception ==
On June 10, 2025, in an article published by The Fader, Noutchang was labeled as one of the "30 coolest artists of 2025," with Steffanee Wang stating how Noutchang and his DPM collective are defining a genre that's more than just another iteration of the Clams Casino and Friendzone sonic palette.
