= List of internet music genres =

The following is a list of internet music genres. Internet music is a style of music influenced by internet culture.

== Internet rap genres ==
=== Cloud rap ===
Cloud rap is a subgenre of internet rap that emerged in the late 2000s, characterized by ethereal, ambient production and lo-fi aesthetics. It was popularized by artists like Lil B and producers such as Clams Casino.

=== Phonk ===
Phonk is a subgenre of hip-hop that draws heavily from 1990s Memphis rap and horrorcore, pioneered by SpaceGhostPurrp, featuring lo-fi samples, chopped and screwed vocals, and cowbells. The genre later gave birth to new microgenres like drift phonk, which were widely popularized on platforms like SoundCloud and TikTok in the late 2010s to early 2020s.

=== Drill ===
Drill music (also known as drill rap or simply drill) originated in Chicago in the early 2010s, known for dark beats and violent, raw lyrics. Chief Keef is credited with popularizing the genre, which later developed scenes in the UK and across the United States.

=== Lowend ===
Lowend is a subgenre of Milwaukee hip-hop that emerged primarily on the internet, focused on heavy bass, slowed-down beats, fast claps and ambient textures.

=== Plugg ===
Plugg (also known as Plugg music) is a subgenre of trap music that developed in the mid-2010s, noted for dreamy, minimal beats often produced with synth pads and bell sounds, emerging around 2013 as a cohesive production style of the collective called Beatpluggz including Atlanta-based producers MexikoDro and StoopidXool. Plugg was inspired by Zaytoven, Project Pat, Juicy J, Gucci Mane, the snap rap group D4L, and the Paper Mario Nintendo soundtrack.

=== Emo rap ===
Emo rap draws influences from trap and cloud rap merging with the themes and aesthetics of emo and alternative rock. Originally pioneered by Bones and Black Kray. Artists like Lil Peep, XXXTentaction and Juice WRLD helped bring it into the mainstream.

=== PluggnB ===
PluggnB is a fusion genre of plugg and contemporary R&B, combining soft melodic vocals, plugg-style instrumentation and dreamy R&B synths. It emerged in the late 2010s and gained popularity on TikTok in the early 2020s, with artists such as Lil Shine, Izaya Tiji, Autumn, Kashdami, SoFaygo, Yeat, Summrs, Weiland, and Kankan and the now-defunct artistic collective known as SlayWorld.

=== Digicore ===
Digicore is a form of internet rap that emerged alongside hyperpop in the late 2010s, characterized by heavy autotune, sped-up and pitched-up vocal effects, centered around online platforms like Discord and SoundCloud. Collectives such as novagang and helix tears have been considered influential.

=== Rage ===
Rage (also known as rage music, or rage rap) is a microgenre of trap music marked by aggressive synths, energetic drums, and distorted vocals. It emerged in the late 2010s, but was popularized in the early 2020s by artists like Yung Fazo, Playboi Carti, Trippie Redd, Ken Carson, Destroy Lonely, Mario Judah and Yeat.

=== Jerk ===
Jerk is an internet rap microgenre that emerged in the early 2020s, taking from the early 2010s wave of jerk rap, the sound was reimagined by Californian producer kashpaint and New York rapper Xaviersobased alongside his collective 1c34 into a completely different style that incorporated fast tempos, melodic synths, and off-kilter lyricism, while blending elements of cloud rap, digicore, Milwaukee lowend and plugg.

=== 2k13 Hood EDM ===
2k13 Hood EDM is a microgenre of EDM trap music pioneered by 1c34 member and rapper St47ic who had also been a member of Jewelxxet along with Lucilfaux.

=== Sigilkore ===
Sigilkore is a microgenre and electronic music movement that started on SoundCloud in the late 2010s and combines aspects of cloud rap and trap music, contrary to its sound, derived from hyperpop. Dark synth melodies, effects and DJ mixing are frequently applied in-post. Lyrical themes in the genre revolve around dark themes, including occultism, blood and vampires.

=== HexD ===
HexD is an internet rap microgenre that emerged in the late 2010s to early 2020s, characterized by heavy use of bitcrushing mixed with sped-up and pitched-up vocals. Originally pioneered by West Coast-based producer she_skin. The term was coined by Hexcastcrew member Stacy Minajj, who released the DJ mix Rare RCB hexD.mp3 on June 15, 2019. It samples and remixes songs from the influential online rap collective Reptilian Club Boyz.

=== Krushclub ===
Krushclub is a subgenre of sigilkore, originating in the early 2020s, mixing Jersey club elements with electronic sound qualities. Blending hyperpop and dance music, known for bitcrushed sounds, cartoonish lyrics, and video game-like energy. Popularized by artists like Odetari, 6arelyhuman, Luci4, and Lumi Athena. The genre draws influence from hexD and sigilkore, reaching wider recognition on online platforms like TikTok.

=== Dark plugg ===
Dark plugg is a microgenre of plugg which grew out of the DMV trap scene, originally pioneered by Surreal Gang producers like XanGang, Orcery, and Eddie Gianni, as well as rappers Slimesito and Fluhkunxhkos. Notable artists include Glokk40Spaz, elijxhwtf, and Smokingskul. According to British newspaper The Guardian, dark plugg is a "micro-trend".

=== Ambient plugg ===
Ambient plugg is a microgenre of plugg blending original plugg's percussion with atmospheric textures, glitchy ad-libs, and meditative synths. Pioneered in the late 2010s by artists like wifi and Izaya Tiji, the style emphasizes mood and texture over lyricism, creating soft, surreal soundscapes. It later gained traction through collectives like Shed Theory and artists like Babyxsosa.

=== Terror plugg ===
Terror plugg (also known as extremo-plugg) is a microgenre of plugg characterized by its use of distorted 808s, eerie melodies, and intense vocal delivery, originally pioneered by producers and rappers Squillo, tdf, marrgielaa, and boolymon. Due to unconventional 808 production, terror plugg experienced a wave of online virality between 2024 and 2025 through internet memes on TikTok and Instagram. Music journalist Kieran Press-Reynolds credited New York rapper Yuke's 2024 single "ian goin" as "the logical excruciating endpoint of the 'terror plugg' style". Notable artists include boolymon, Lazer Dim 700, twovrt, and savage.

== Vaporwave genres ==
=== Eccojams ===
Eccojams (also known as echo jams) is a microgenre and early progenitor of vaporwave originally coined by musician Daniel Lopatin with the release of Chuck Person's Eccojams Vol. 1 (2010). According to Lopatin, the style began as a simple exercise in looping a slowed-down segment of a song while adding vibrating echoes. It would become an influence on early vaporwave artists such as b0dyg0d, Ramona Langley, INTERNET CLUB, MediaFired and EEGPROGRAMS, with Lopatin describing the style as "a DIY practice that didn't involve any specialized music tech knowledge".

=== Vapor ===
In 2025, the Vaporwave News Network stated that the term "vapor" was an umbrella genre, citing Rate Your Music's entry for the term, or a "meta-genre", while citing writer Roy Shuker's book Popular Music Culture: The Key Concepts' definition of "meta-genre". The publication stated that vapor "unites around the digital appropriation of recontextualized signifiers and sounds. It points to something greater than the formation of a static music genre- it's like a cloud of particles that when grouped together form something you can almost see, feel, and touch but is also destined for entropy and will eventually scatter into many different directions".

=== Future funk ===
Future funk is a French house-inspired offshoot that expands upon the disco and house elements of vaporwave. It involves much of the same visual imagery drawn from 1980s and 1990s anime, with reference points including Urusei Yatsura, Super Dimension Fortress Macross, Kimagure Orange Road, and Sailor Moon. Musically, future funk is produced in the same sample-based manner as vaporwave, albeit with a more upbeat approach. Most of the music samples are drawn from Japanese city pop records from the 1980s and 1990s, and the genre has led to an increased exposure of city pop music to Western audiences.

Some of the most popular future funk artists include Macross 82-99, who pioneered the genre with his Sailorwave album series in 2013, Other artists described as being the most popular in future funk include Skylar Spence (aka Saint Pepsi), Tsundere Alley, Ducat, Yung Bae, and Night Tempo.

=== Simpsonwave ===
Simpsonwave is an Internet aesthetic and YouTube phenomenon that emerged in the mid-2010s. In late 2015, user Spicster uploaded an edit of the American animated television series The Simpsons to the song "Resonance" by HOME onto Vine. The video went viral and sparked a trend featuring scenes from The Simpsons paired with various vaporwave tracks. In 2016, users Midge and Lucien Hughes further developed and popularized the movement with the use of clips often edited out of context with VHS-style distortion effects and surreal visuals, creating a "hallucinatory and transportive" atmosphere.

=== Late night lo-fi ===
Late night lo-fi (or late-nite lo-fi) is a subgenre featuring slowed-down 1980s pop and jazz that emulates recorded programs on old 4:3 televisions. Its main progenitor is Luxury Elite, known for her music's high-class aesthetic.

=== VHS pop ===
VHS pop is a more upbeat variant of late night lo-fi characterized by a richer sound and vibrant, nostalgic aesthetics.

=== Utopian virtual ===
Utopian virtual is an offshoot of vaporwave originally coined by musician James Ferraro with the release of Far Side Virtual (2011), which showcased Ferraro's concept of a “virtual life soundtrack,” combining crisp, unreal early 3D computer graphics with vaporwave textures. The style later became associated with the Frutiger Aero Internet aesthetic.

=== Signalwave ===
Signalwave (or broken transmission) samples and distorts radio broadcasts, television programs, and station idents, particularly from The Weather Channel. Representative artists include 猫 シ Corp and CT57.

=== Slushwave ===
Slushwave is the ambient branch of vaporwave, creating immersive soundscapes with extended tracks often exceeding 10 minutes. Notable artists include t e l e p a t h テレパシー能力者, SOARER, and Desert Sand Feels Warm at Night.

=== Hardvapour ===
Hardvapour emerged in late 2015 as a reimagination of vaporwave with darker themes, faster tempos, and heavier sounds. It is influenced by speedcore and gabber, and defines itself against the utopian moods sometimes attributed to vaporwave. Hardvapour artists include wosX and Subhumanizer.

=== Mallsoft ===
Mallsoft amplifies vaporwave's lounge influences. It may be viewed in connection to "the concept of malls as large, soulless spaces of consumerism ... exploring the social ramifications of capitalism and globalization". Popular mallsoft artists include Disconscious, Groceries, Hantasi, and Cat System Corp. (known for his 2016 9/11 tribute album News at 11).

=== Fashwave ===
Fashwave (from "fascist") is a largely instrumental fusion of synthwave and vaporwave that originated on YouTube circa 2015. Artists include Cybernazi, Xurious, Andrew Anglin, and Elessar. It is also been described as an extremist subset of the non-extremist latter promoted by neo-Nazis. With political track titles and occasional soundbites, the genre combines Nazi symbolism with the visuals associated with vaporwave and synthwave. According to Hann, it is musically derived from synthwave, while Heavy contributor Paul Farrell writes that it is "considered to be an offshoot from the harmless vaporwave movement." The visual aesthetic of fashwave, consisting of typical vaporwave elements mixed with fascist symbols like the black sun, odal rune, or crusader imagery, has been associated with the "Dark MAGA" imagery surrounding Trump and Ron DeSantis. It has been parodied by anti-fascists, such as with the Dark Brandon meme, a mocking imitation of the "Dark MAGA" imagery surrounding Trump.

In 2023, the DeSantis campaign let go of their campaign director, after it was publicized that a campaign aide had created a DeSantis "fan edit" featuring the black sun symbol. In late 2025 and early 2026, videos posted on social media by both the United States Department of Labor and the Department of Homeland Security has been described as resembling fashwave.

=== Juchewave ===
Juchewave (from "Juche") is a version of vaporwave which idealises North Korea, especially popular culture of the 1980s in North Korea. The movement combines music with nostalgic videos of the capital Pyongyang.

=== Barber beats ===
Barber beats was originally coined and popularized by artists such as Haircuts for Men and Macroblank. The subgenre heavily samples and slows down smooth jazz, lounge music, and R&B from the 1980s to the early 2000s.

== Internet rock genres ==
=== Incelcore ===
Incelcore is a microgenre of rock music pioneered by musician and internet personality Negative XP (formerly known as School Shooter), drawing influence from punk, electronic and alternative rock.

== Internet electronic music genres ==
=== Nightcore ===
Nightcore is a music genre and style of mixing that involves applying sped-up and pitched-up effects to a song, particularly trance and Eurodance songs but can also be applied to any form of music. The term is derived from the Norwegian musical duo "Nightcore" who coined and popularized the style.

=== Tänzelcore ===
Tänzelcore or Keller synth is a combination of electronic dance music and the aesthetics of extreme metal. The style is characterized by high-tempo beats, gabber kicks, and hardcore techno structures layered with crude, lo-fi synthesizer melodies that evoke medieval fantasy soundtracks. The name is derived from the German "Tänzel", meaning "to prance". The genre is known for its absurdist medieval aesthetic and was created in Saarland by artist Sigfrid. Artist TopfHelm described the genre's atmosphere as "witches gathering in a dark forest at night to perform strange rituals" in an interview.

== See also ==
- List of music microgenres
