= Internet rap =

Umbrella term for hip-hop associated with Internet culture

- Other names: Online rap; blog rap (early)
- Stylistic origins: Hip hop; trap
- Cultural origins: Late 2000s – 2010s, Internet communities and social media platforms such as Myspace and SoundCloud
- Typical instruments: Vocals (auto-tune); Drum machine (Roland TR-808); Synthesizers; Samples

Subgenres
- Cloud rap; emo rap; phonk; mumble rap; sigilkore; digicore; jerk; plugg; pluggnb; scam rap; rage; lowend; crushed trap

Regional scenes
- Global, notably the United States, the United Kingdom, Sweden, and Argentina

Local scenes
- Atlanta; Chicago; Los Angeles; Stockholm

Other topics
- Internet rap collectives; Internet music; underground rap; alternative hip-hop

Internet rap (also known as online rap or originally blog rap) is a style of hip-hop that emerged in the late 2000s, initially spreading through the online blogosphere, and early social media platforms like Myspace and later Tumblr, as well as mixtape-sharing site DatPiff.

Internet rap encompasses various online styles and aesthetics deeply intertwined with internet culture, memes, and digital communities. Unlike traditional hip-hop, internet rap is characterized by music primarily influenced by the internet. Artists often favor online music distribution platforms such as SoundCloud, with songs frequently promoted and shared through streaming services like YouTube, TikTok, and Instagram.

Though many internet rappers achieve mainstream success, artists within this label have been described as alternative or underground rap. The scene was originally based primarily on trap music but later gave rise to several Internet music microgenres and subcultures.

== Etymology and characteristics ==
According to music journalist Alphonse Pierre, writing for Pitchfork, the term "internet rappers" was once used as a dismissive label but later popularized by the "SoundCloud generation". Writing for The Guardian, journalist Emilie Friedlander stated that during the blog era, bloggers "were trawling the internet to uncover the next great bedroom producer, internet rapper or hyper-specific musical trend." Adding that, internet rap shared the "collagist, hyper-referential approach to sound" of the Internet microgenre chillwave.

== History ==
=== 1990s–2000s: Forerunners ===
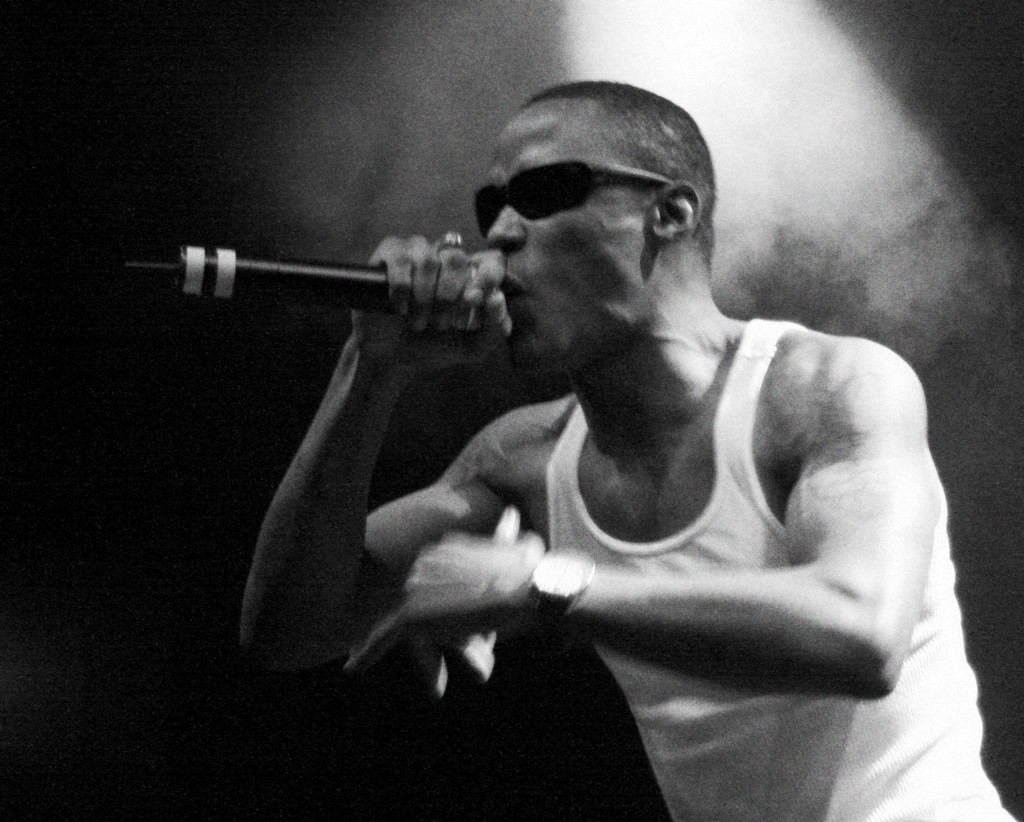
Canibus performing in 2007

During the mid-to late 1990s, Canibus became the first rapper to make references to the Internet in hip-hop. On the track "DJ Clue Freestyle" released in 1997, Canibus stated, "I'll battle you on the net, I'll battle you in the flesh." He later created his own website, known as "www.canibus.com", which was promoted alongside his debut album Can-I-Bus in 1998. In 2002, he launched "MicClub.net", named after his second album Mic Club: The Curriculum, where he shared music, lyrics, and interacted with his fans, which made him one of the earliest rappers to own a personal website and use the internet as a creative and promotional platform.

In 1998, Florida rapper Trick Daddy also made reference to the internet and its visual aesthetics, with the release of his album www.thug.com, which was the URL of his official website.

=== 2000s–2010s: Blog era ===
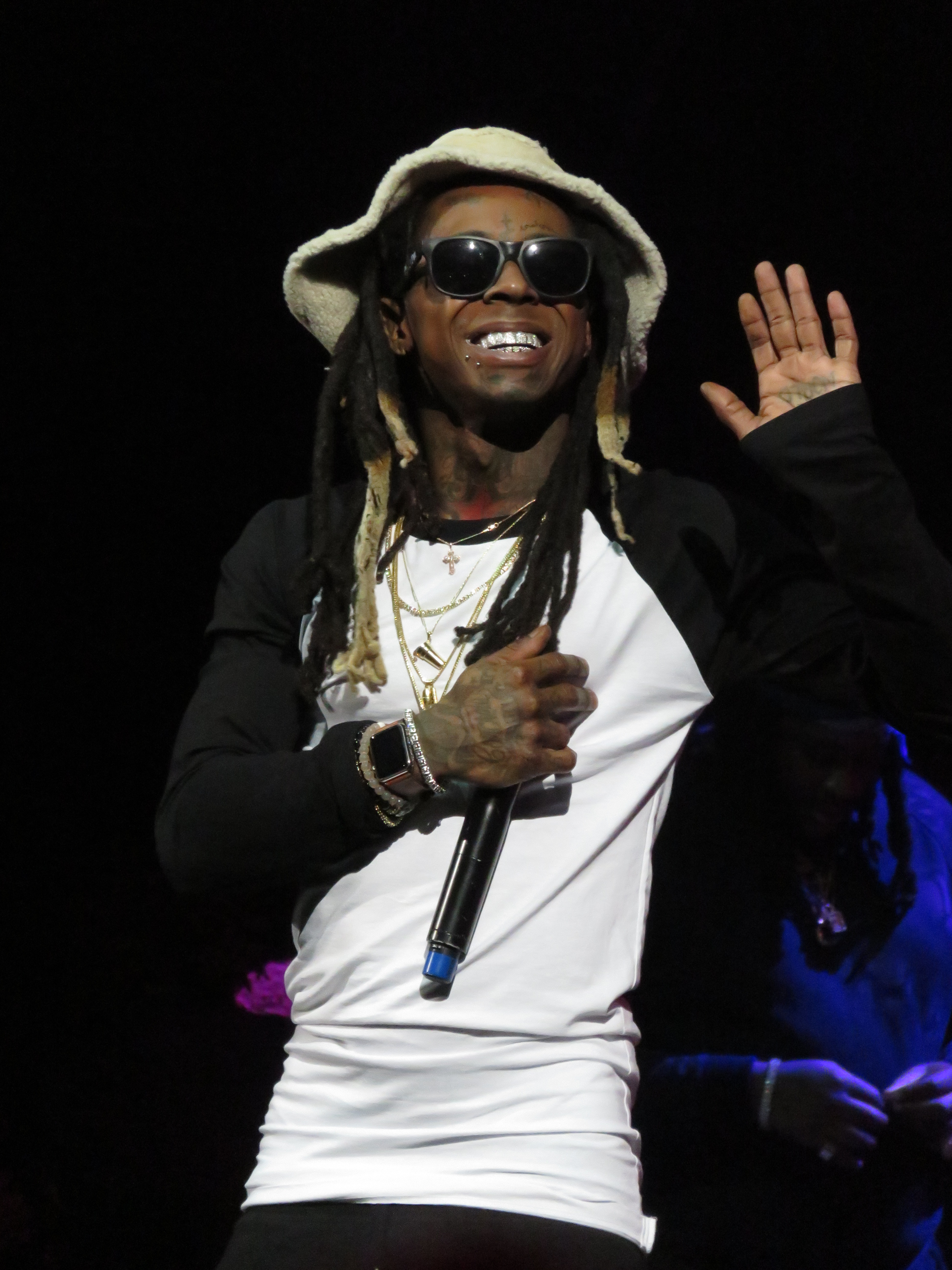
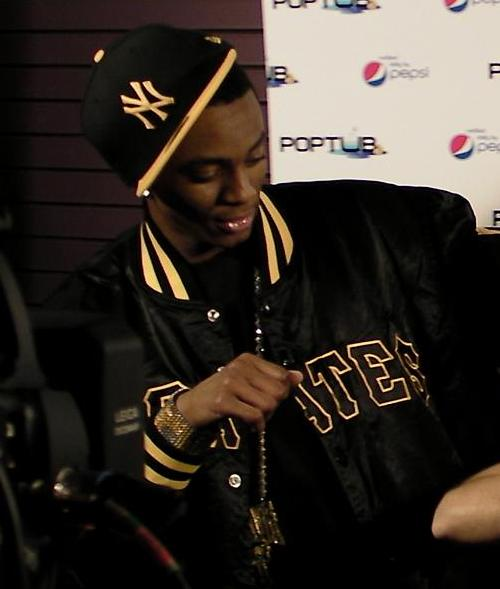
Rappers Lil Wayne and Soulja Boy were early influential adopters of the Internet and social media in the 2000s

In the late 2000s, influential rappers like Lil Wayne and Soulja Boy were the first to embrace social media, with the latter being credited as the first rapper to have a Twitter account. At the time, the Internet was a novelty that hadn't yet been implemented into the music industry. Artists such as Soulja Boy who were growing up with the early stages of social media used it for their image.

Wayne and Soulja Boy helped redefine hip-hop through their approaches to online distribution, as their popularity grew largely from freely sharing songs through online music videos, demonstrating to the hip hop music industry that uploading your songs for free on the internet could effectively build a fan base and generate profit, which was an unpopular idea at the time. Writer Kyle Kramer of Vice, stated:

[...] the lawlessness of the internet matched the disorder of Wayne’s music and the frenzy with which he was working. He was incredible precisely because he wasn’t following a formula for success, because his best verse might be a throwaway two-minute freestyle over someone else’s beat. Just like hip-hop had done in its earliest years, just as the internet itself seemed to do, Lil Wayne in 2007 promised creativity unbounded by any rules.

Internet rap music was originally referred to as "blog rap" due to hip-hop artists in the 2000s primarily distributing their music through the early online blogosphere, artists in other genres would also proliferate through blogs which led to the emergence of early online music scenes like blog rock and bloghouse. Early internet rappers operated primarily on the early social media platform Myspace as well as mixtape-sharing site DatPiff, which became an influential hub for the movement. Artists like Soulja Boy drew influence from early 2000s hip-hop subgenres such as crunk and snap rap. Artists such as Asher Roth, B.o.B, Kid Cudi, Mickey Factz, Wale, and Charles Hamilton who released music and gained attention primarily through music blogs stood out amongst their contemporaries.

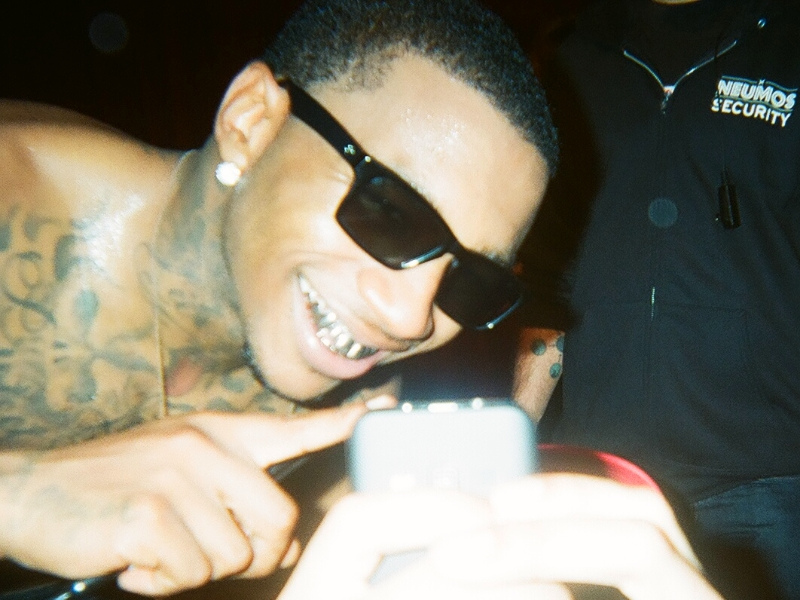
Lil B, credited as "the godfather of internet rap".

By 2009, influential rapper Lil B emerged, with his success largely linked to internet virality and an embrace of broader online trends, while Lil B and his producer Clams Casino have been credited with pioneering the trap-based subgenre of cloud rap. His popularity inspired a generation of internet-based rappers who drew influence from online spaces, movements, memes, and digital culture. He has influenced multiple other rappers, with record producer Metro Boomin stating on Twitter: "Lil B is responsible for a lot of careers man. A true hip hop pioneer".

Lil B has been credited as "the godfather of internet rap," and influencing a whole generation of online rap artists. British magazine Dazed stated "he's the father of 'Internet rap' and probably follows you on Twitter".

=== Early 2010s: Cloud rap & Internet rap collectives ===
By the early 2010s, influential Internet rap collectives such as Odd Future, Brockhampton, A$AP Mob, Metro Zu, 88Rising, Soulection, Ruby Yacht, Pro Era, and Raider Klan gained prominence. In 2012, The Guardian credited collectives such as Taylor Gang, A$AP Mob, Black Hippy, Pro Era, YMCMB (Young Money), Most Dope, Maybach Music, Odd Future and Raider Klan as bringing back the "hip-hop crew." Artists continued to proliferate on blog-related websites like Tumblr, and distributed music through SoundCloud, YouTube, and Spotify. Other influential figures included Danny Brown, Tyler, the Creator, and Yung Lean. The term hipster hop would also emerge to describe some artists from this time period who were making internet rap reflective of hipster culture, applied to artists such as The Cool Kids and Kid Cudi.

Around this time, the broader internet rap scene began to amass wider audiences, following the online virality of Lil B, with rappers also drawing influence from Waka Flocka Flame, Gucci Mane and Juicy J. Other pivotal influences included Chicago's Chief Keef who helped popularize and pioneer drill music, with his style significantly influencing both mainstream trap music and online rap scenes.

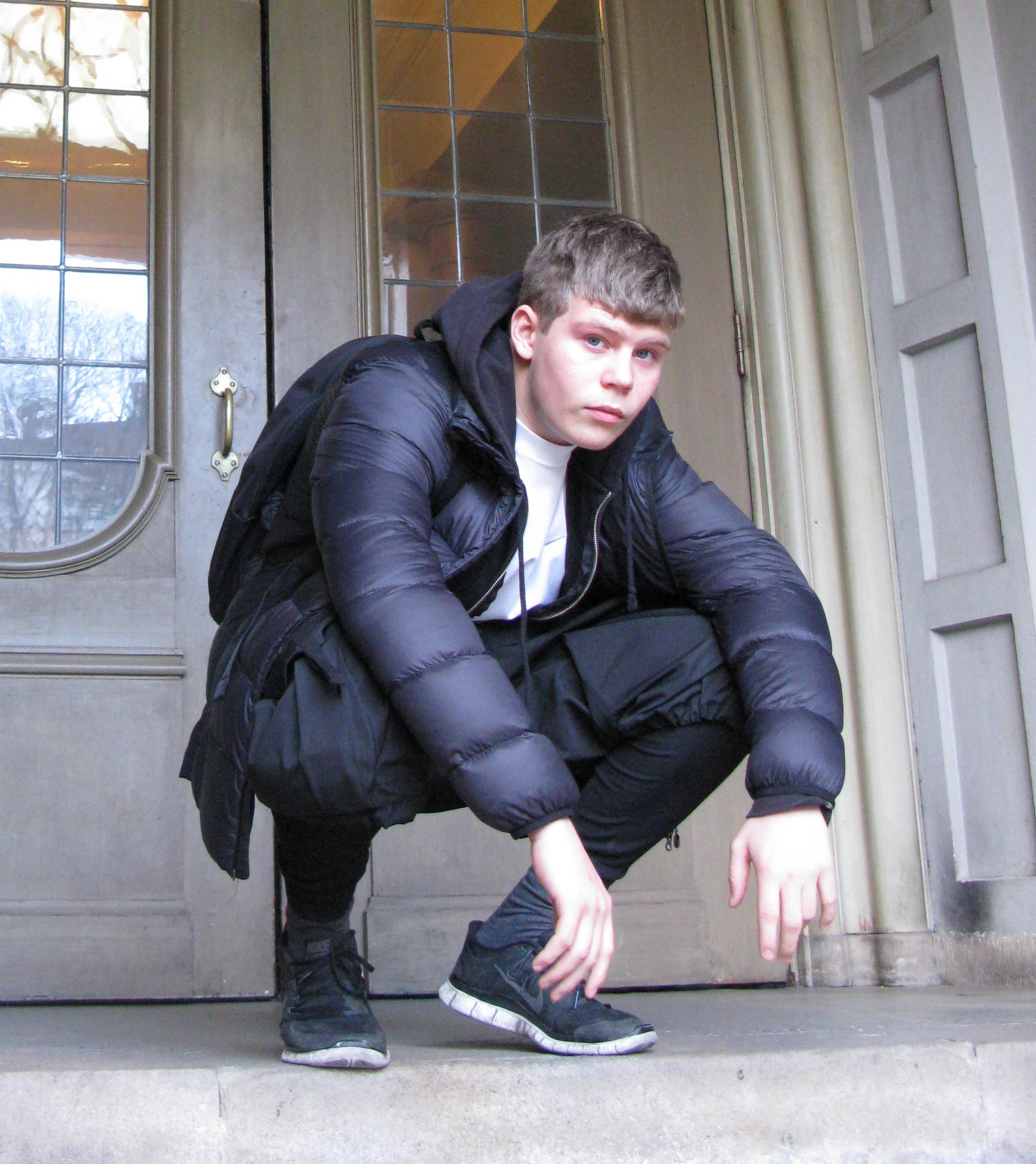
Yung Lean's tracks "Ginseng Strip 2002" and "Hurt" contributed to the wider popularization of cloud rap and vaporwave visual aesthetics

In 2012, Black Kray's Goth Money alongside Wicca Phase's GothBoiClique and cloud rap pioneer Bones, would later draw influences from witch house, leading to the development of emo rap, later popularized by Lil Peep, XXXTentacion and Juice WRLD. Additionally, Kray's early collaborations with Working on Dying contributed to the development of tread music. By 2013, Swedish cloud rap artist Yung Lean's track "Ginseng Strip 2002" went viral online, influencing a new generation of internet rappers. Amarco referred to Lean, who visually drew influence from seapunk and vaporwave aesthetics, as "by and large a product of the internet and a leading example of a generation of youths who garner fame through social media." The Swedish online rap collective Drain Gang, consisting of Bladee, Ecco2k, Thaiboy Digital, and Whitearmor, further influenced the development of online rap music.

Contemporaneous developments in online underground rap during this period included experimental and industrial hip-hop artists such as Death Grips, JPEGMAFIA, Clipping and Injury Reserve.

=== Mid–late 2010s: SoundCloud rap ===
During the mid-to-late 2010s, the music distribution site SoundCloud became a central hub for a new style and movement in online hip-hop. South Florida's SoundCloud rap scene proved heavily influential to the sound of this era, drawing heavy influence from South Florida rap collectives like SpaceGhostPurrp's Raider Klan and Metro Zu. Artists like Denzel Curry, Lil Tracy (Yung Bruh) and Lil Peep would emerge from the scene, as well as Lil Pump, who would rise to internet virality through his 2017 single, "Gucci Gang".

This era was defined by artists like XXXTentacion, Lil Uzi Vert, Lil Yachty and Playboi Carti, who were collectively labeled soundcloud rap. Although internet rappers had been releasing music on SoundCloud for years, it was only during this period that the term "soundcloud rap" became associated with a specific sound. Subsequently, the term "mumble rap" later emerged as a pejorative to describe the off-kilter lyricism and unclear cadence and delivery of these rappers. Additionally, Playboi Carti's Opium label became responsible for the emergence of notable artists such as Ken Carson and Destroy Lonely in the late 2010s, who both reached wider popularity in the early 2020s. Artists associated with the label pioneered a fashion style described as "opiumcore", which drew from punk and alternative fashion, with the broader underground rap scene's internet-driven aesthetics being noted as influential to the high fashion world.

=== 2020s ===
During the early 2020s, many internet rap microgenres emerged or would primarily develop such as sigilkore, digicore, rage, jerk, krushclub, pluggnb, ambient plugg, terror plugg and hexd, with Rolling Stone describing the 2020s underground rap scene as "extremely online". Additionally, influential collectives during this period include Novagang and Surf Gang. Online platforms such as Discord and online games like Roblox have been noted as influential.

According to music journalist Kieran Press-Reynolds, writing for Pitchfork, American rapper Nettspend "bleached his hair, and promptly became exalted on subreddits and Discord servers as the Bieber, or the Cobain, of fried internet rap".

Notable influential scenes and artists began to gain wider popularity during this period which included Luci4, Islurwhenitalk, Odetari, 6arelyhuman, Kets4eki, Pröz, Cade Clair and Asteria in the sigilkore and krushclub scene; Summrs, Tana, Kankan, Iayze and Autumn! in the plugg and pluggnb scene; Yeat, Osamason, Yung Fazo, Prettifun and Che in the rage scene; as well as Xaviersobased, Nettspend and Yhapojj in the jerk scene. Although these artists initially emerged from these scenes, some later embarked onto other musical styles and movements.

Influential acts include Lithuanian rapper Yabujin and Internet rap collective Reptilian Club Boyz. Other notable artists include 2hollis, Sematary and Rich Amiri. Subsequently, the online underground rap sound expanded to multiple international and regional scenes around the world, particularly in the United Kingdom as spearheaded by artists such as Lancey Foux, Fimiguerrero, Fakemink, Len Lucci, and YT. In China, artists Bloodz Boi, Billionhappy and Jackzebra emerged. While in Argentina, the scene was spearheaded by the SwaggerBoyz collective led by AgusFortnite2008 and Stiffy.

== Related genres ==
=== Cloud rap ===
Cloud rap is a subgenre of internet rap that emerged in the late 2000s, characterized by ethereal, ambient production and lo-fi aesthetics. It was popularized by artists like Lil B and producers such as Clams Casino.

=== Phonk ===
Phonk is a subgenre of hip-hop that draws heavily from 1990s Memphis rap and horrorcore, pioneered by SpaceGhostPurrp, featuring lo-fi samples, chopped and screwed vocals, and cowbells. The genre later gave birth to new microgenres like drift phonk, which were widely popularized on platforms like SoundCloud and TikTok in the late 2010s to early 2020s.

=== Drill ===
Drill music (also known as drill rap or simply drill) originated in Chicago in the early 2010s, known for dark beats and violent, raw lyrics. Chief Keef is credited with popularizing the genre, which later developed scenes in the UK and across the United States.

=== Lowend ===
Lowend is a subgenre of Milwaukee hip-hop that emerged primarily on the internet, focused on heavy bass, slowed-down beats, fast claps and ambient textures.

=== Plugg ===
Plugg (also known as Plugg music) is a subgenre of trap music that developed in the mid-2010s, noted for dreamy, minimal beats often produced with synth pads and bell sounds, emerging around 2013 as a cohesive production style of the collective called Beatpluggz including Atlanta-based producers MexikoDro and StoopidXool. Plugg was inspired by Zaytoven, Project Pat, Juicy J, Gucci Mane, the snap rap group D4L, and the Paper Mario Nintendo soundtrack.

=== Emo rap ===
Emo rap draws influences from trap and cloud rap merging with the themes and aesthetics of emo and alternative rock. Originally pioneered by Bones and Black Kray. Artists like Lil Peep, XXXTentaction and Juice WRLD helped bring it into the mainstream.

=== PluggnB ===
PluggnB is a fusion genre of plugg and contemporary R&B, combining soft melodic vocals, plugg-style instrumentation and dreamy R&B synths. It emerged in the late 2010s and gained popularity on TikTok in the early 2020s, with artists such as Lil Shine, Izaya Tiji, Autumn, Kashdami, SoFaygo, Yeat, Summrs, Weiland, and Kankan and the now-defunct artistic collective known as SlayWorld.

=== Digicore ===
Digicore is a form of internet rap that emerged alongside hyperpop in the late 2010s, characterized by heavy autotune, sped-up and pitched-up vocal effects, centered around online platforms like Discord and SoundCloud. Collectives such as novagang and helix tears have been considered influential.

=== Rage ===
Rage (also known as rage music, or rage rap) is a microgenre of trap music marked by aggressive synths, energetic drums, and distorted vocals. It emerged in the late 2010s, but was popularized in the early 2020s by artists like Yung Fazo, Playboi Carti, Trippie Redd, Ken Carson, Destroy Lonely, Mario Judah and Yeat.

=== 2k13 Hood EDM ===
2k13 Hood EDM is a microgenre of EDM trap music pioneered by 1c34 member and rapper St47ic who had also been a member of Jewelxxet.

=== Jerk ===
Jerk is an internet rap microgenre that emerged in the early 2020s, taking from the early 2010s wave of jerk rap, the sound was reimagined by Californian producer kashpaint and New York rapper Xaviersobased alongside his collective 1c34 into a completely different style that incorporated fast tempos, melodic synths, and off-kilter lyricism, while blending elements of cloud rap, digicore, Milwaukee lowend and plugg.

=== Sigilkore ===
Sigilkore is a microgenre and electronic music movement that started on SoundCloud in the late 2010s and combines aspects of cloud rap and trap music, contrary to its sound, derived from hyperpop. Dark synth melodies, effects and DJ mixing are frequently applied in-post. Lyrical themes in the genre revolve around dark themes, including occultism, blood and vampires.

=== HexD ===
HexD is an internet rap microgenre that emerged in the late 2010s to early 2020s, characterized by heavy use of bitcrushing mixed with sped-up and pitched-up vocals. Originally pioneered by West Coast-based producer she_skin. The term was coined by Hexcastcrew member Stacy Minajj, who released the DJ mix Rare RCB hexD.mp3 on June 15, 2019. It samples and remixes songs from the influential online rap collective Reptilian Club Boyz.

=== Krushclub ===
Krushclub is a subgenre of sigilkore, originating in the early 2020s, mixing Jersey club elements with electronic sound qualities. Blending hyperpop and dance music, known for bitcrushed sounds, cartoonish lyrics, and video game-like energy. Popularized by artists like Odetari, 6arelyhuman, Luci4, and Lumi Athena. The genre draws influence from hexD and sigilkore, reaching wider recognition on online platforms like TikTok.

=== Dark plugg ===
Dark plugg is a microgenre of plugg which grew out of the DMV trap scene, originally pioneered by Surreal Gang producers like XanGang, Orcery, and Eddie Gianni, as well as rappers Slimesito and Fluhkunxhkos. Notable artists include Glokk40Spaz, Elijxhwtf, and Smokingskul. According to British newspaper The Guardian, dark plugg is a "micro-trend".

=== Ambient plugg ===
Ambient plugg is a microgenre of plugg blending original plugg's percussion with atmospheric textures, glitchy ad-libs, and meditative synths. Pioneered in the late 2010s by artists like wifi and Izaya Tiji, the style emphasizes mood and texture over lyricism, creating soft, surreal soundscapes. It later gained traction through collectives like Shed Theory and artists like Babyxsosa.

=== Terror plugg ===
Terror plugg (also known as extremo-plugg) is a microgenre of plugg characterized by its use of distorted 808s, eerie melodies, and intense vocal delivery, originally pioneered by producers and rappers Squillo, TDF, Marrgielaa, and Boolymon. Due to unconventional 808 production, terror plugg experienced a wave of online virality between 2024 and 2025 through internet memes on TikTok and Instagram. Music journalist Kieran Press-Reynolds credited New York rapper Yuke's 2024 single "ian goin" as "the logical excruciating endpoint of the 'terror plugg' style". Notable artists include boolymon, Lazer Dim 700, Twovrt, Savage and 16berry.

== See also ==
- List of hip-hop genres
- List of Internet rap collectives
- List of Internet music genres

== Bibliography ==
- Gamble, Steven (2024). Digital Flows: Online Hip Hop Music and Culture. OUP USA. ISBN 978-0197656396.
