= Dismiss Yourself =

American netlabel

- One of the logos associated with Dismiss Yourself
- Founded: 2020
- Founder: Sticki
- Genre: Internet music
- Country of origin: United States
- Location: California
- Official website: dismissyourself.com

Dismiss Yourself is an American California-based independent netlabel founded by music archivist and curator Sticki in 2020. The label began as an Internet music-based YouTube channel in 2017. It has been described as a "hub for Internet weirdness", while Pitchfork credited the label with helping to "kickstart the hexD scene".

In 2020, Dismiss Yourself published its first official release, Surge Compilation Vol. 1, on Bandcamp. The compilation's success helped develop the surge microgenre and encourage artists to release their work under the imprint. The label has released material for artists such as Yabujin, Hi-C, Fax Gang, Islurwhenitalk, SpaceGhostPurrp, Viper, D0llywood1, MajinBlxxdy, Osquinn, Dealers of God, and Club Casualties.

== History ==
In 2017, Sticki (then known as Whimee) created the YouTube channel Dismiss Yourself. According to music journalist Kieran Press-Reynolds, writing for Bandcamp Daily, he would "Find a treasure trove of radiant weirdness, and post it". Releases included the video game Sploder (2007)'s official soundtrack, 100 gecs' album Square Garden, and Boards of Canada's Live Tunes Bootleg.

During the COVID-19 pandemic, the channel began to build a community around uploads for Panchiko's D>E>A>T>H>M>E>T>A>L and tomoe_theundy1ng's Rare RCB hexD.mp3, which became the most viewed releases on the channel and were regarded as "forum-core" by Press-Reynolds, due to them growing a cult following on discussion threads with fans who "devise intricate conspiracy theories related to the albums' mystifying origins".

By April 2020, Dismiss Yourself made its first official release as a record label imprint, Surge Compilation Vol. 1, which was distributed on Bandcamp. The compilation became influential in the development of the Internet microgenre "surge". Its success led several artists to seek out the label to release their albums under. Sticki later dropped out of college to run the label full-time. According to a close collaborator, the success of Team Mekano's Classic_Project_𝟸000.3gp opened the door for reevaluating Dismiss Yourself as a serious record label.

In 2021, Dismiss Yourself launched Care (stylized in lowercase), a sub-label catering to smaller independent musicians.

Dismiss Yourself has been described by Press-Reynolds, writing for Pitchfork, as helping to "kickstart the hexD scene". When creating the label, Sticki stated, "I don't care about genres, I like the personality and story behind artists". The publication compared the label to the Japanese netlabel Lost Frog Productions, which contributed to the development of the microgenre "dariacore" in Japan, stating that Dismiss Yourself acted closer to "digital foragers than commercial machines". The label was also described as "chronically online", while Bandcamp Daily noted it as a "hub for Internet weirdness".

The label has released material for artists such as Yabujin, Hi-C, Fax Gang, Islurwhenitalk, SpaceGhostPurrp, thanks god, Purity Filter, Sienna Sleep, Team Mekano, Stomach Book, Viper, D0llywood1, MajinBlxxdy, Xhris2Eazy, Sybyr, Osquinn, Aero Gros M, Miya Lowe, and Club Casualties.
