= Rare RCB hexD.mp3 =

2019 album by Stacy Minajj as tomoe_theundy1ng

Remix album by tomoe_theundy1ng and Reptilian Club Boyz
- Released: June 15, 2019
- Recorded: 2019
- Genres: HexD; surge; cloud rap
- Length: 14:47
- Label: Self-released
- Producer: tomoe_theundy1ng

Tomoe_theundy1ng and Reptilian Club Boyz chronology
IH4TEMYEXES.EP (2019)	Rare RCB hexD.mp3 (2019)	Hexd Radio (2019)

Rare RCB hexD.mp3 is a remix album by American rapper and record producer Stacy Minajj of the music collective Hexcastcrew. Released on June 15, 2019 under the alias tomoe_theundy1ng, it features remixes of songs by the Internet rap collective Reptilian Club Boyz.

The album is widely regarded as a pioneering release in the development of the Internet microgenre hexD, as well as its associated styles, including crushed trap and surge. Its production incorporates heavily processed techniques, including bitcrushing and tempo acceleration. Rare RCB hexD.mp3 was later reissued by the netlabel Dismiss Yourself. An August 2019 upload to the label's YouTube page contributed to the project's growing online following, eventually assisting it in attaining a cult following among Rate Your Music users.

The album has been cited as an influential release among both established and aspiring producers on the SoundCloud platform, inspiring the creation of similarly styled mixes. Music journalist Kieran Press-Reynolds described Rare RCB hexD.mp3 as a release that "crystalliz[ed] the surge scene".

== Background ==
Rare RCB hexD.mp3 was produced by American rapper and producer Stacy Minajj of the music collective Hexcastcrew. The DJ mix was made through samples and remixes of songs by the Internet rap collective Reptilian Club Boyz. The mix made use of techniques such as bitcrushing and tempo acceleration, which became a core aspect of the Internet microgenre hexD. The term "HexD" originally emerged through Hexcastcrew who, according to Sticki, the founder of netlabel Dismiss Yourself, "hex songs—in their words, they cast spells [via] bitcrushing the music." Music publication Passion of the Weiss credited Stacy Minajj with coining the term.

Writing for Pitchfork, music journalist Kieran Press-Reynolds stated that the underground scene in the early 2020s was "splintering every which way, from wailing digicore to bitcrushed hexD." They (Note: Kieran Press-Reynolds uses they/them pronouns.) credited Reptilian Club Boyz as being alongside other groups in "the nexus for a new vanguard". Nashville rapper Hi-C, who founded the collective, is noted as "a key influence on the development of HexD" according to The Fader.

RCB hexD.mp3 was released on June 15, 2019, by Stacy Minajj on the SoundCloud account "tomoe_theundy1ng". The original upload was later deleted. The album cover featured an anime succubus. In August 2019, the label Dismiss Yourself uploaded the album to its YouTube channel. Writing for Complex, Press-Reynolds stated that the album circulated online for months, "accruing tens of thousands of YouTube views" and developing a cult following on the website Rate Your Music. Writing for Bandcamp Daily, they noted it had become one of the most viewed releases on the Dismiss Yourself channel and regarded it as "forum-core" due to it growing a cult following on discussion threads with fans who "devise intricate conspiracy theories related to the albums' mystifying origins". At the time of the album's release, its creator and the titles of the original tracks were unknown. The original unmixed versions of the Reptilian Club Boyz songs were also briefly lost. When the original songs were found, Press-Reynolds noted that fans "felt like something essential was missing without the deformities created by the mystery remixer".

== Content ==
Music journalist Kieran Press-Reynolds stated of the album, "the collection sounds catastrophic, like a heavy van ran over the original tracks and this is what's left." Adding that, "The songs are also sped up, which makes the rappers sound hyperreal." They further stated that Reptilian Club Boyz made use of several digital effects, and "when these kinds of sparkly textures get flattened, the end product sounds like it's coming out of the 8-bit speakers of a Game Boy". Music publication Passion of the Weiss compared the album to nightcore remixes due to its anime cover art and speed. Adding that the album was "cloud rap so cloudy it transcends into noise" and noting that bitcrushing has never "been used to such psychedelic effect".

== Track listing ==
=== Original release ===
No.	Title	Producer(s)	Length
1.	"Rare RCB hexD.mp3"	tomoe_theundy1ng	14:47
Total length:			14:47

=== Tracks by Reptilian Club Boyz ===
The following tracks are the original content that Rare RCB hexD.mp3 uses as source material

All tracks are written by Reptilian Club Boyz.

No.	Title	Producer(s)	Length
1.	"Palice"	Hi-C
2.	"Cnt Evn Stnd Up 222"	Hi-C
3.	"Medusa Blood"	Hi-C
4.	"Pull Up Drinking Lean"	Hi-C
5.	"Halo"	Hi-C
Total length:			14:47
