= Bodypartz =

2020 debut single by Luci4

Single by Luci4

from the album Noktifers Symphony
- Released: November 17, 2020
- Recorded: 2020
- Label: Atlantic; Bad Realm
- Songwriter: James Dear
- Producer: Luci4

Luci4 singles chronology
"Kurxxed Emeraldz" (2020)	"Bodypartz" (2020)	"Dying in xxtyle (trendxxetter 3)" (2021)

Music video
- "Bodypartz" on YouTube

"Bodypartz" is the debut single by the American rapper Luci4, released on November 17, 2020, through Atlantic Records. The song was written and produced by Luci4. It gained virality on platforms such as TikTok and later received a gold certification from the Recording Industry Association of America (RIAA).

== Background and release ==
Luci4 had initially started producing songs under the moniker 4jay and joined SpaceGhostPurrp's collective BMB Deathrow. In the late 2010s, Dear pioneered the microgenre known as sigilkore. "Bodypartz" would be released on November 17, 2020. Following the song's success in 2021, Luci4 signed a record deal with Atlantic Records.

== Reception ==
In 2021, the song gained virality on platforms such as TikTok, with Complex declaring it "still his biggest hit". Billboard described the music video as an "apocalyptic visual to the blaring track". In 2024, the song was certified gold by the Recording Industry Association of America (RIAA). The music video has amassed over four million views on YouTube. Following Luci4's death in February 2026, HotNewHipHop reported that fans gathered in the music video's comment section to leave tributes.

== Release history ==
Release dates and formats for "Bodypartz"
Region	Date	Format(s)	Version(s)	Label	Ref.
Various	November 17, 2020	Digital download; streaming	Original	Atlantic; Bad Realm	
Various	May 29, 2021	Digital download; streaming	Double A-side; slowed and reverbed	Atlantic; Bad Realm	

== Certifications and sales ==
Region	Certification	Certified units/sales
United States (RIAA)	Gold	500,000^{‡}
^{‡} Sales+streaming figures based on certification alone.
