= Yabujin =

Musical artist

- Official logo associated with Yabujin

Background information
- Also known as: DJ GYROTTA ZAO, ligonis24, Y A B H I E L, LAMIANAGA
- Born: Rokas Tarulis; April 24, 1999 (age 27); Visaginas, Lithuania
- Genres: Cloud rap; jumpstyle; hexD
- Occupations: Rapper; record producer
- Years active: 2015–present
- Label: Dismiss Yourself

Rokas Tarulis (born April 24, 1999), known professionally as Yabujin or DJ Gyrotta Zao (stylized in uppercase), is a Lithuanian rapper and record producer. He is considered a "mysterious" influential figure in the 2020s underground rap scene with releases that span genres such as cloud rap, hexD, and jumpstyle.

== Early life ==
Rokas Tarulis was born on April 24, 1999, in Visaginas, Lithuania.

== Career ==
Tarulis rose to prominence online in the 2020s, blending styles such as rap, electronic, and jumpstyle. He has released jumpstyle tracks under the alias DJ Gyrotta Zao. Writing for Pitchfork, music journalist Kieran Press-Reynolds noted that in Tarulis' album covers and videos "bizarre figures stretch and elongate, their voices muffled and mangled; images superimpose like poorly designed clickbait; the text is foreign and stuffed with symbols." The "Yabujin masterdoc" is a list which catalogues Tarulis' work.

According to Press-Reynolds, Tarulis is a "mysterious" artist who has released material under several aliases across many different accounts and names, often deleting them or disappearing for long periods. Press-Reynolds described Tarulis as "underground ephemera", and believed that he had never done an interview, only released one piece of merchandise, and never performed live. The Internet music archivist "Music Place" featured Tarulis' song 'gnom.mp3' under the alias Λąųmę§ğęƴđžįąɲţ on their SoundCloud account.

== Musical style and artistry ==
Press-Reynolds stated that Tarulis' work is influenced by the "decayed glimmer" of the Internet rap collective Reptilian Club Boyz along with the "waterlogged pixels" of producer $ludgehammer. His songs have been compared to Bladee and SpaceGhostPurrp. Press-Reynolds cited the song "CHALICE OF MIND" as "most intoxicating" while also citing songs such as "SECRET GROTTOES" and "FLASH DESIRE". They (Note: Kieran Press-Reynolds uses they/them pronouns.) have also noted Tarulis as concerned with "North Korean aesthetics" and associated with the Internet music microgenre hexD.

=== Azeroy ===
Tarulis' work is connected to a fictional world of symbols, characters, and stories he refers to as "Azeroy". Press-Reynolds noted that fans "compared Yabujin's work to an 'ARG,' or alternate reality game, because there's so much to get invested in". Tarulis' visual aesthetic for his Azeroy series is, according to Press-Reynolds, inspired by Web 2.0 era iconography, such as the use of "144p quality Unregistered HyperCam footage". Tarulis also developed a cryptic language, numbers such as 1616 translate to evil, 8888 to good. Fans have interpreted Azeroy as an allegory for North Korea.

== Influence ==
According to Press-Reynolds, artists such as 2hollis and Ken Carson have been influenced by Yabujin. English rapper EsDeeKid was cited by British magazine I-D as listening to Yabujin's songs.

Additionally, Tarulis' jumpstyle songs under the alias DJ GYROTTA ZAO spawned a "TikTok genre" referred to as "Yabujin-core". British magazine Dazed noted the style as "Yabujin jumpstyle", defined as "a niche internet movement", adding that "the yabujin community thrives on platforms like TikTok and Discord, offering a virtual space for fans of hardstyle music".

Russian music producer Dayerteq has cited Yabujin as an influence.

== Discography ==
=== Mixtapes ===
Title	Mixtape details
Flash Desire	Released: December 21, 2019; Label: Self-released; Format: Digital download, streaming
? ? ? ?	Released: September 30, 2022; Label: Self-released; Format: Digital download, streaming

=== EPs ===
Title	EP details
Fezome	Released: December 31, 2016; Label: Self-released; Format: Digital download, streaming
She Likes Swords and Doing Drugs 1	Released: May 30, 2018; Label: Self-released; Format: Digital download, streaming
Baroque	Released: May 18, 2020; Label: Self-released; Format: Digital download, streaming
Swords	Released: November 15, 2020; Label: Self-released; Format: Digital download, streaming
Claws	Released: September 22, 2022; Label: Self-released; Format: Digital download, streaming
Flash Desire	Released: December 21, 2022; Label: Self-released; Format: Digital download, streaming
Laumių Dovanos	Released: June 28, 2025; Label: Self-released; Format: Digital download, streaming
