= HexD =

Mixing style and microgenre

- Other names: Hex; hexxed; hexcore
- Stylistic origins: Hyperpop; trap; breakbeat; emo rap; lo-fi; electronic; trance; cloud rap; nightcore; digicore
- Cultural origins: Late 2010s; United States
- Typical instruments: Drum machine; autotune; synthesizer; pitch shifter; sampler; hi-hats
- Derivative forms: Crushed trap; surge; sigilkore

Subgenres
- Krushclub

Fusion genres
- Sextrance

Other topics
- Internet rap; microgenre; internet aesthetic; zoomergaze; glitch; vaporwave

The compilation album Surge Compilation Vol. 1 (2020) released by the netlabel Dismiss Yourself

HexD is an Internet microgenre of electronic music and style of audio mixing that emerged in the late 2010s to early 2020s. The term "hexD" was originally coined by the music collective Hexcastcrew. The style is defined by a form of DJ mixing that uses heavy bitcrushing, sped-up and pitched-up effects to create a distorted "glitched-out" sound, which is commonly referred to as "hexxing" a song. The mixing style is primarily applied to the trance and cloud rap genres, along with other styles.

In 2019, the release of the album Rare RCB hexD.mp3 by Stacy Minajj under the alias tomoe_theundy1ng marked the crystallization of the scene. The mix sampled songs by the American Internet rap collective Reptilian Club Boyz, the group's founder Hi-C has been noted as influential to the development of the style. The album gained notoriety through the netlabel Dismiss Yourself, which contributed to the scene's development.

HexD spawned subgenres such as crushed trap and surge, which were initially used synonymously. It also influenced the development of microgenres such as sigilkore, which uses extensive bitcrushing effects. Artists associated with the hexD scene include Yabujin, Fax Gang, ZBITO18, $pirit Gurlz and the group HelloKittyWaffenDivision.

== Etymology and characteristics ==
According to Sticki, the founder of the netlabel Dismiss Yourself, the term "hexD" originally emerged through the music collective Hexcastcrew, who "hex songs—in their words, they cast spells [via] bitcrushing the music." The process of "hexxing" a song involves a style of DJ mixing that makes heavy use of bitcrushing and digital effects.

During the early 2020s, hexD was briefly known as "surge", after the Dismiss Yourself compilation album Surge Compilation Vol. 1 (2020). The term "crushed trap" had also been an early synonym for the style. The visual aesthetics of hexD draw influence from anime, internet aesthetics, and early Web 2.0 era iconography and artwork primarily associated with the 2006 online GIF editor Blingee as a form of childhood nostalgia that has been compared to the vaporwave microgenre. According to WKNC-FM, the mixing style is reminiscent of early Internet "low quality trance/adjacent EDM" anime AMVs.

HexD is primarily characterized by its style of DJ mixing which is primarily applied to trance and cloud rap genres. Similarly to nightcore, the style is also applied to other genres. HexD is defined by the use of bitcrushing, a production technique that produces distortion through the reduction of bandwidth and digital audio data. Artists usually apply bitcrushing to specific instruments or the entire master track, speeding and pitching up vocals as well as overall instrumentation. Alternative Press magazine described the style as "sped up, bitcrushed and glitched out".

== History ==
=== Precursors ===
In 2011, Untrance released a mixtape titled "Deleted Seniors", which featured EDM music mixed with heavy bitcrushing, marking one of the first times the extreme use of the effect was incorporated as an aesthetic quality in music. Writing for Complex, music journalist Kieran Press-Reynolds stated that the scene had roots in the work of rappers SpaceGhostPurrp and Cartier God. West Coast producer she_skin had earlier explored bitcrushing trap songs by Virginia rapper Diamondsonmydick, which influenced the Hexcastcrew collective.

=== Late 2010s–2020s: Origins ===
The hexD scene initially emerged in June 2019 with the release of the DJ mix Rare RCB hexD.mp3 by Stacy Minajj under the alias "tomoe_theundy1ng". It sampled and remixed songs from the influential Internet rap collective Reptilian Club Boyz. Writing for Pitchfork, music critic Kieran Press-Reynolds stated that the underground scene in the early 2020s was "splintering every which way, from wailing digicore to bitcrushed hexD." They (Note: Kieran Press-Reynolds uses they/them pronouns.) credited Reptilian Club Boyz as being alongside other groups in "the nexus for a new vanguard". According to the Fader, Nashville rapper Hi-C who founded the collective is noted as "a key influence on the development of HexD".

Subsequently, the netlabel Dismiss Yourself, which focused on obscure Internet music, uploaded the Stacy Minajj mix to their YouTube channel on August 23, 2019, which became instrumental to the wider proliferation of the hexD genre. Pitchfork credited the label with helping to "kickstart the hexD scene". In April 2020, the label released the various artists compilation album Surge Compilation Vol. 1, where artists in the scene "found a collective identity".

By March 2021, Alternative Press magazine labelled the group Fax Gang as "hexDers" and merging the style with shoegaze. They were also compared to the act $pirit Gurlz. The publication added, "ZBITO18 and the rest of HELLOKITTYWAFFENDIVISION provide a comprehensive catalog of hexD-ed (aka sped up, bitcrushed and glitched out) neon Myspace-core rave insanity." Followed by an article from April that year stating, "The Blackwinterwells-led Helix Tears collective is SoundCloud's most exciting rabbit hole of glitchcore/hexD emo-rap transcendentalists". Lithuanian rapper Yabujin has been associated with the scene.

== Related terms ==
=== Surge ===
Surge is an Internet microgenre of hip-hop that emerged in the late 2010s and early 2020s. The term was initially used synonymously with crushed trap and hexD. The style was named after the Dismiss Yourself compilation album Surge Compilation Vol. 1 (2020). The term "surge" was coined by a Discord friend of Sticki, the founder of the label, who created a fictional cover, which was later used as the official cover art for the compilation.

Writing for Complex, music journalist Kieran Press-Reynolds described the style as "mellow and murky, a sort of lo-fi trap sound loaded with retro sound effects and compressed to sound like it was recorded on an old laptop microphone". Adding that the scene did not crystallize until the release of Rare RCB hexD.mp3 in June 2019, a mix produced by tomoe_theundy1ng sampling a set of singles by the group Reptilian Club Boyz.

== See also ==
- Hyperpop
- Digicore
- Sigilkore
- Internet rap
- Zoomergaze
- Underground hip-hop
