= St47ic =

American rapper (born 2005)

- St47ic in 2025

Background information
- Born: Emoni Payne; March 4, 2005 (age 21); Chattanooga, Tennessee
- Genres: Jerk; 2k13 Hood EDM; trap; cloud rap; plugg
- Occupations: Rapper; record producer
- Years active: 2019–present
- Member of: 1c34; WitchGang
- Formerly of: Jewelxxet

Emoni Payne (born March 4, 2005), known professionally as St47ic (stylised in lowercase), is an American rapper and record producer who pioneered the Internet microgenres 2k13 Hood EDM and jerk.

He formed the collective WitchGang and is a member of rapper Xaviersobased's group 1c34. Payne has been described by Pitchfork as an "enigmatic artist".

== Early life ==
Emoni Payne was born on March 4, 2005 in Chattanooga, Tennessee.

== Career ==
Payne coined the microgenre 2k13 Hood EDM. He was previously a part of the now defunct Jewelxxet collective formed by rapper Luci4. In 2021, he released the single "Witches and Angels" produced by New York rapper Xaviersobased. Writing for Pitchfork, music journalist Alphonse Pierre stated it was "The must-hear rap song of the day", describing Payne as an "enigmatic artist" and adding that the song sounded as if it "was made to soundtrack a fan made AMV (probably one with demons and lots of blood)". Pierre compared the song to the work of Goth Money Records.

In October 2024, British artist Mark Leckey and music journalist Kieran Press-Reynolds played Payne's song "*Wgokys* Genre Killer" on NTS Radio. Press-Reynolds ranked the song at number 1 on their list of "The top 15 songs of 2024", stating "St47ic should be one of the most celebrated of this generation, but I selfishly hope he stays underground so he'll keep dropping hellspawn bass and writing titles so long they're like evil haikus."

Payne formed the collective WitchGang, described by British magazine I-D as an "anarchic collective" which featured rappers such as P6nk. In 2023, rapper Zuro brought Nettspend to a WitchGang Discord server early in his career.

== Discography ==
=== Studio albums ===
- Screaming Disco (2022)
- Lost Boys (2024)
- Pu$$$y (2026)

=== Extended plays ===
- Umukara (2021)
- 17 (2022)
- 47 (2022)
- Nobody (2022)
- Love U (2022)
- WG (2023)
- Witches, Mood Swings (2023)
- This Just for Fun (2023)
- WGOKYS (2024)
