= DJ Daddy Yonqui =

Chilean musician (born 1994)

DJ Daddy Yonqui (born Charlotte Vásquez, March 28, 1994) is a Chilean musician, producer, and DJ based in Santiago, Chile.

== Life and career ==
DJ Daddy Yonqui was born in March 28th, 1994, in Santiago, Chile. She started working under the moniker Orquesta Pandroginia in the local underground scene, experimenting with industrial, noise and ambient music. Alongside with JP (Segunda Mordida, DJ Tekeñño) and Coni Lobos (Hypereikon), she gave life to the label Medio Oriente in 2016.

In 2020, she started the group Team Mekano. Their debut LP, Classic_Project_2000.3gp, was the first release by the Dismiss Yourself label, marking the start of her journey as DJ Daddy Yonqui.

== Discography ==
=== LPs ===
- Visual Boy Advance (2021) (Split)
- Xiaomi Screamo (2023)
- Emoji Unicode Beta (2025)

=== EPs ===
- Spica² (2025)
