= Islurwhenitalk =

American rapper

- Also known as: DJ Slur, Slurr S1nt6n6, 10kSlurr, deth
- Born: Santana Lopez; February 3, 2003 (age 23); South Carolina, U.S.
- Genres: Trap; sigilkore; vampjerk
- Occupations: Singer; songwriter; record producer; rapper
- Years active: 2018–present
- Formerly of: Jewelxxet

Santana Lopez (born February 3, 2003), known professionally as Islurwhenitalk, is an American rapper, record producer and musician. He is the co-founder of the collective Jewelxxet and is known for pioneering several Internet microgenres, such as sigilkore, vampjerk and jugg.

== Career ==
Lopez and Luci4 founded the online rap collective Jewelxxet. Both later pioneered a mixing style they dubbed "sigilkore", which later became its own distinct Internet music microgenre. Writing for Pitchfork, music critic Kieran Press-Reynolds noted Lopez as a "sigilkore deity".

== Impact ==
Lopez has been noted as an influential figure in the SoundCloud rap and underground scene. He is credited with pioneering the Internet microgenres sigilkore, vampjerk, and jugg.
