= Luci4 =

American rapper (2002–2026)

- Dear in 2025

Background information
- Also known as: Axxturel: 4jay; BMB 4jay; Noktifer; Skkkult3x; Prynce Axxturel; Axx; 4jay X Luci4; Lucifer; Gebhuza; XaTuring; Igetrakks
- Born: James Dear; August 2, 2002; Los Angeles, California, U.S.
- Died: February 22, 2026 (aged 23) Los Angeles, California, U.S.
- Genres: Hip-hop; sigilkore; electronic
- Occupations: Singer; songwriter; record producer; rapper
- Years active: 2016–2026
- Labels: Bad Realm; Atlantic
- Formerly of: BMB Deathrow; Jewelxxet

James Dear (August 2, 2002 – February 22, 2026), known professionally as Luci4, was an American rapper, singer-songwriter, and record producer. He was the founder of the internet rap collective Jewelxxet and was known for pioneering a mixing style he coined "sigilkore", which became its own distinct Internet microgenre.

Born in Los Angeles, California, Dear began producing music after getting a laptop for Christmas. He started his music career in 2016 and assumed the stage name "4jay". In 2017, he gained popularity due to one of his beats being used by rapper Tay-K for his song "Gotta Blast" off his second and final mixtape, Santana World.

Dear later became a part of rapper SpaceGhostPurrp's collective BMB Deathrow. He initially gained mainstream attention in 2020 with his single "Bodypartz", which received a gold certification by the RIAA, following a surge in popularity on TikTok. Dear's songs gained wider popularity on social media in 2021, leading to him signing a record deal with Atlantic Records. He was considered an influential figure in the underground rap scene, inspiring notable artists such as Xaviersobased, OsamaSon, Odetari, and Che.

== Life and career ==
James Dear was born on August 2, 2002, in Los Angeles, California. Dear began producing drill beats as a kid after getting a laptop for Christmas. In 2017, he received recognition as a teenager due to a beat he had posted to YouTube being used by rapper Tay-K for his song "Gotta Blast" off his second and final mixtape, Santana World. Dear later became a producer in BMB Deathrow, also known as Black Money Boyz Deathrow, a collective formed by SpaceGhostPurrp in 2015. In 2019, Dear formed the collective Jewelxxet with Islurwhenitalk. Rappers such as MajinBlxxdy, Bacleo, Xaviersobased and St47ic would also become members. Dear was noted as a part of the SoundCloud rap movement and descending from horrorcore and Memphis rap.

Dear and fellow American rapper Islurwhenitalk pioneered a mixing style known as "sigilkore" which was originally used in their track titles, but later became known as a distinct microgenre. Dear also pioneered the subgenre krushclub with his song "Kurxxed Emeraldz", which earned over 200,000 streams in mid-2021. His songs "Bodypartz", "All Eyez on Me", "Ave Domina Lilith", and "Kurxxed Emeraldz" would also go viral on TikTok. On January 24, 2024, "Bodypartz" was certified gold by the Recording Industry Association of America. Dear released music under several titles such as 4jay, Luci4, BMB 4jay, Noktifer, Axxturel, Skkkult3x, Prynce Axxturel, Axx, 4jay X Luci4, Lucifer, Gebhuza, XaTuring, and others.

== Death ==
On February 22, 2026, Dear was found dead at a friend's home in Los Angeles at age 23. His manager, Kayla G, confirmed his death on TikTok. According to the Los Angeles County Medical Examiner, Dear died as a result of fentanyl toxicity, with the manner being listed as accidental. However, Dear's grandparents raised suspicions as his wallet was found completely emptied out, suggesting that he was murdered and then robbed. They had previously expressed concern over his choice of friends and associates.

== Legacy ==
In 2025, writing for Pitchfork, music critic Kieran Press-Reynolds noted Dear as a "sigilkore pioneer". In the article titled "The 5 Most Exciting Musical Rabbit Holes of 2025 So Far", Press-Reynolds cites Dear in a section titled "Axxcelerationism" as inspiring notable artists such as OsamaSon and Che, and a wave of "hex rap". On February 26, 2026, Press-Reynolds while writing for Pitchfork published an article in tribute to Dear, noting artists such as Xaviersobased, Lumi Athena and Odetari as drawing inspiration from his work. The Guardian described Dear's sound as "almost like he's trying to impersonate the internet".

== Discography ==
=== Studio albums ===
Title	Details
#R2D	Released: October 31, 2022; Label: Self-released; Formats: Digital download, streaming
VampMania 3	Released: March 7, 2025; Label: Self-released; Formats: Digital download, streaming

=== Mixtapes ===
Title	Details
Axxturel Unleaxxhed	Released: February 4, 2020; Label: Self-released; Formats: Digital download, streaming
VampMania: #AfterParty	Released: March 12, 2021; Label: Self-released; Formats: Digital download, streaming

=== EPs ===
Title	Details
Gettin Money 1	Released: August 2, 2018; Label: Self-released; Formats: Digital download, streaming

=== Singles ===
List of singles with title, year released, album, and certifications shown
Title	Year	Peak chart positions	Certifications	Album
Title	Year	WW	Certifications	Album
"Kurxxed Emeraldz"	2020	—		Non-album singles
"Bodypartz"	2020	—	RIAA: Gold	Non-album singles
"All Eyez on Me"	2020	—		Non-album singles
"Dead n Gone"	2021	—		Non-album singles
"Dying in Xxtyle (TrendXxetter 3)"	2021	—		VampMania : #AfterParty
"Jabbawockeez"	2022	—		#R2D
"Hey"	2023	—		Non-album singles
