= Evanora Unlimited =

American artist and record producer

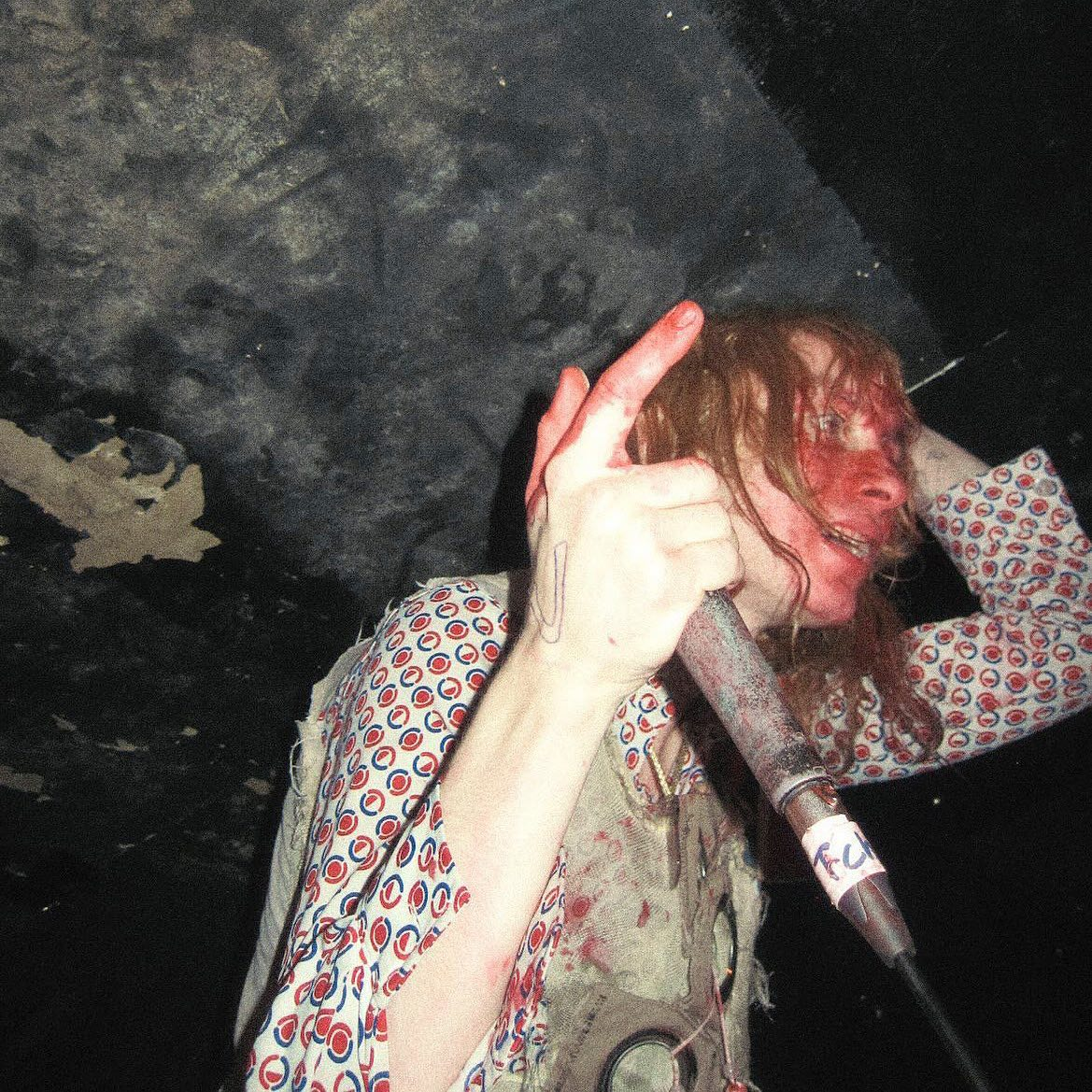
- Evanora Unlimited Live in Tokyo.

Background information
- Also known as: Evanora:Unlimited, Marjorie -W.C. Sinclair, housepett
- Born: Orion Sage Ohana; February 2, 2000 (age 26); Oakland, California
- Genre: Experimental pop
- Occupations: Rapper; singer; record producer; songwriter
- Years active: 2018–present
- Formerly of: Reptilian Club Boyz

Orion Sage Ohana (born February 2, 2000), known professionally as Evanora Unlimited, Marjorie -W.C. Sinclair, and housepett, is an American record producer and multidisciplinary artist from Oakland, California.

== Early life ==
Ohana was born in Oakland, California. Both of his parents were DJs, exposing him to the underground rave scene and teaching him Ableton Live at an early age. Prior to his success touring full-time as a musician, Ohana broke into his local underground music scene around 2016, going to shows with a camera from his Berkeley High School video class, documenting the events, editing recaps, and sending the footage to the performing artists. With the network he met, Ohana would get further into music and video production, as well as themself organizing a variety of underground shows and raves around the Bay Area. In 2018, Ohana would break away from strictly producing for other artists and began producing their first solo project under the alias Evanora:Unlimited and shortly after Marjorie W.C Sinclair.

== Career ==
Ohana's first full-length project as Evanora Unlimited, Lustful Expanse, was released in 2020. This release was followed by singles "Limestone" featuring She Diamond, "Age of Information" featuring Taraneh and Ivy Knight, and "Sequoia Tide" featuring She Diamond and produced by Yves Tumor; Evanora Unlimited also supported dates with Yves Tumor on their 2022 tour with Ecco2k and 2023 tour with Pretty Sick. Perfect Answer, the second full-length Evanora Unlimited project, was released in February 2024.

Ohana was also a member of the collective Reptilian Club Boyz under his side project Marjorie W.C. Sinclair and producer alias Housepett until its disbandment in 2021.

== Artistry ==
Ohana describes Evanora:Unlimited as a "based on true events erotic science fiction religious horror epic" encompassing music, pornfilm, fashion, and performance art. While the Evanora Unlimited project draws most heavily from noise music, Ohana also releases more Bay Area Rap-oriented records under his Marjorie W.C. Sinclair alias.

== Discography ==
=== As Evanora Unlimited ===
List of albums, with selected details
Title	Details
Perfect Answer	Released: February 22, 2024; Format: Digital download
Lustful Expanse	Released: September 2, 2020; Format: Digital download

==== Singles ====
===== As lead artist =====
List of singles as lead artist
Title	Year	Album
"Porno"	2020	Lustful Expanse
"Limestone"	2020	Non-album singles
"Age of Information"	2022	Non-album singles
"Dibiyu" (featuring Ecco2k)	2023	Non-album singles
"Salt Water"	2024	Perfect Answer
"Sequoia Tide" (featuring Yves Tumor and She Diamond)	2024	Perfect Answer

===== As featured artist =====
List of singles as featured artist
Title	Year	Album
"Cut the String" (Ivy Knight featuring Evanora Unlimited)	2022	Feet of Mud

=== As Marjorie W.C. Sinclair ===
==== Albums ====
List of albums, with selected details
Title	Details
Marjorie -W.C. Sinclair	Released: February 22, 2020; Format: Digital download
Position 2 (Extended)	Released: May 18, 2021; Format: Digital download
22nd Chances	Released: September 1, 2022; Format: Digital download
Greyhaven Pinkmoon	Released: September 22, 2023; Format: Digital download
Blindman's Holiday	Released: February 2, 2025; Format: Digital download
Beimax Chessclub	Released: June 6, 2025; Format: Digital download

==== Singles ====
===== As lead artist =====
List of singles as lead artist
Title	Year	Album
"Ocean Floors"	2020	Non-album singles
"Objectify"	2020	Non-album singles
"Genesis 12:13"	2021	Non-album singles
"Kishimoto 3 (ok Whatevrr"	2021	Non-album singles
"Raw Pastry"	2021	Non-album singles
"Dubaii"	2021	22nd Chances
"Daikirai"	2021	22nd Chances
"GUNDAM"	2021	Non-album singles
"Only Yours"	2021	Non-album singles
"OKCupid/Iraq"	2023	Non-album singles
"Queen of Hearts/1000 Ways to Die (Al Dente)"	2023	Greyhaven Pinkmoon
"Cheap Thrills"	2023	Greyhaven Pinkmoon
"Pay 2 Play"	2023	Greyhaven Pinkmoon
"Hypnosis"	2023	Greyhaven Pinkmoon
"Croatian Islands"	2023	Greyhaven Pinkmoon
"больше Ничего (Nothing Else)"	2024	Non-album singles
"Idziemy do Charlotte"	2024	Non-album singles
"Operation "Misery""	2024	Non-album singles
"Xiaohongshu (小红书)"	2024	Blindman's Holiday
"Dissolution of Czechoslovakia feat. Yvncc"	2025	Non-album singles

==== Guest appearances ====
List of non-single guest appearances, showing year released and album name
Title	Other artist(s)	Year	Album
"Bed&Breakfast"	GUTTERRING	2022	BODYLEPSIS
"Bitches"	Coco & Clair Clair	2022	Sexy
