= Reptilian Club Boyz =

Hip-hop collective

- Logo associated with Reptilian Club Boyz

Background information
- Also known as: Blood Rayne Boys
- Origin: 2016, Nashville, Tennessee
- Genres: Cloud rap; tread; hexD
- Years active: 2016–2021
- Past members: Hi-C; Diamondsonmydick; Cartier'God; LazyGod; Marjorie -W.C. Sinclair; Matty Vanilla; Draco Murcielago; 48run0; Truly Based; Lil Shine; Blxxdy; Stunny; vulp3sv3lox; sadparappa; Jugg6k; Lil Kawaii; Flansie; KRXXK

Reptilian Club Boyz, also known as RCB or Blood Rayne Boys, was an American modern hip hop collective based in Tennessee. RCB was founded by rappers Hi-C and Diamondsonmydick in 2016, they have been credited as influential in the 2020s underground rap scene and development of the hexD genre.

== History ==
In 2016, the Reptilian Club Boyz collective was founded by Nashville rapper and producer Hi-C and Virginia rapper Diamondsonmydick. The group was a Tennessee-based collective of producers and rappers. The collective released singles in 2017 such as "prettyboydemongang anthem SURFS UP WHITE BOY ROCK NIGGA SWAGG" which marked their evolution from cloud rap to the early surge style. The group were managed by rapper Marcy Mane from 2019 to 2021. The Fader described the group as an "Internet rap collective".

Reptilian Club Boyz released its debut mixtape, Reptilian Shrine, in 2017. Its last mixtape, #RockOutGang, released on March 15, 2020, shortly before the collective's disbandment in 2021.

== Musical style and artistry ==
According to music journalist Kieran Press-Reynolds, writing for Complex, "Reptilian Club Boyz sprinkled their original tunes with a panoply of pretty digital effects—lots of stuff from the video game Castlevania: Aria of Sorrow."

== Members ==
In 2018, Cartier God, Draco Murcielago (also known as Draco Montana / GxTHCHYLD), FileFantasy, 48run0, LazyGod, and Matty Vanilla joined the collective. In 2019, Lil Mai, Marjorie -W.C. Sinclair (also known as Evanora Unlimited / Housepett), Truly Based, and sadparappa joined. In 2020, Blxxdy, Lil Shine, PLAYWITHGUNS, Stunny, and vulp3sv3lox (Vulpixxx) joined. FileFantasy departed in 2019, and Draco Murcielago departed in 2020. In 2021, Flansie and KRXXK joined. Members with unknown join years were Jugg6k and Lil Kawaii, the former left RCB in 2021. Lil Kawaii died of a fentanyl overdose in August 2021 when he took a counterfeit percocet pill that was cut with the substance, unbeknownst to him.

=== Hi-C ===
Hi-C
- Born: Christian Shaw; January 31, 1998 (age 28); Nashville, Tennessee, United States
- Genres: Southern hip-hop; trap; cloud rap; tread; surge
- Occupations: Rapper; singer; record producer
- Years active: 2011–present
- Formerly of: Reptilian Club Boyz

Christian Shaw (born January 31, 1998), known professionally as Hi-C, is an American rapper and record producer. Hi-C co-founded the collective Reptilian Club Boyz in 2016. He began making music in the early 2010's originally adopting the aliases Chris the Pharoah and then Crystvr before settling on Hi-C. The pseudonym "High C" was inspired by a remark made by Shaw's then-boss at a job he used to work at, who erroneously believed he was high all the time when he was actually overheated and experiencing exhaustion.

In 2023, The Fader reviewed Hi-C's album L3Ft 4 D3ad and noted him as "a key force in the development of HexD music". Shaw has been noted as an influence on rappers Xaviersobased and preme4l. He has also collaborated with Xaviersobased, MikeBrokeAsf, rockstarcliff, selfmadesav, Lil Yawh, WiFiGawd, Gods Wisdom, Cooper B. Handy, and former Reptilian Club Boyz member Cartier'God.

== Influence ==
Writing for Pitchfork, music critic Kieran Press-Reynolds noted Lithuanian rapper Yabujin as taking from the "decayed glimmer" of Reptilian Club Boyz, with Yabujin himself stating on an archived Instagram story that he was "naturally RCB cloning" himself, and that he swapped the "evil, dark, demon" theme present in RCB's music with angels. American rapper Xaviersobased credited the "tempo changes" in his music on tracks like "crisp dubs" as inspired by the work of Reptilian Club Boyz. Press-Reynolds later noted the group as being at a new vanguard in the early 2020s underground, which was "splintering" from digicore and hexD.

In June 2019, a collection of Reptilian Club Boyz's songs were compiled into a mix with the use of bitcrushing effects and released as Rare RCB hexD.mp3 by artist Stacy Minajj under the alias tomoe_theundy1ng. The mix has been credited with crystallizing the "surge" scene.

== Discography ==
=== Mixtapes ===
Title	Mixtape details
Reptilian Shrine	Released: 2017; Label: Self-released; Format: Digital download, streaming
Demons n Tokyo tha Movie	Released: 2019; Label: Self-released; Format: Digital download, streaming
Blood Rain Boys the Game	Released: 2019; Label: Self-released; Format: Digital download, streaming
ReptilianClubBoyz Bizzare Adventure Vol. 1	Released: 2019; Label: Self-released; Format: Digital download, streaming
#RockOutGang	Released: 2020; Label: Self-released; Format: Digital download, streaming

=== EPs ===
Title	EP details
Reptilian Cashapp Boyz EP	Released: 2019; Label: Self-released; Format: Digital download, streaming
#BloodThirsty	Released: 2019; Label: Self-released; Format: Digital download, streaming

=== Singles ===
Title	Single details
pop a green goblin (frakenstn wlk)	Released: 2016; Label: Self-released; Format: Digital download, streaming
Demon With the Scope	Released: 2017; Label: Self-released; Format: Digital download, streaming
Reptilian Ritual	Released: 2017; Collaborators: Slug Christ & Sickboyrari; Label: Self-released; Format: Digital download, streaming
Palice	Released: 2017; Label: Self-released; Format: Digital download, streaming
og gass!	Released: 2017; Collaborators: Diamondsonmydick & Hi-C; Label: Self-released; Format: Digital download, streaming
Palice	Released: 2017; Collaborators: Diamondsonmydick & Hi-C; Label: Self-released; Format: Digital download, streaming
Take That Pussy Nigga Soul	Released: 2018; Label: Self-released; Format: Digital download, streaming
Draculina	Released: 2018; Label: Self-released; Format: Digital download, streaming
In Da Underworld Playing San Andreas	Released: 2018; Label: Self-released; Format: Digital download, streaming
Prettyboydemongang Anthem Surfs Up White Boy Rock Nigga Swagg	Released: 2018; Label: Self-released; Format: Digital download, streaming
Demonsinyotrap!	Released: 2018; Label: Self-released; Format: Digital download, streaming
Ohh Yeaaa Juiced Up Pop Punk Emo Swag	Released: 2019; Label: Self-released; Format: Digital download, streaming
Pretty Boy Demon Shottah Gang Shit	Released: 2019; Label: Self-released; Format: Digital download, streaming
Hang 10	Released: 2019; Label: Self-released; Format: Digital download, streaming
OK! (hard in tha paint)	Released: 2019; Label: Self-released; Format: Digital download, streaming
PrettyDemonRockstarz (It's the Drugs)	Released: 2019; Label: Self-released; Format: Digital download, streaming
#PrettyBoyHideout	Released: 2020; Label: Self-released; Format: Digital download, streaming
#GuitarBuisness	Released: 2020; Collaborators: RCB; Label: Self-released; Format: Digital download, streaming
Corpse Bridee	Released: 2021; Label: Self-released; Format: Digital download, streaming
Marceline	Released: 2021; Label: Self-released; Format: Digital download, streaming
PuffyAmiYumi	Released: 2021; Label: Self-released; Format: Digital download, streaming
Waffle House	Released: 2021; Label: Self-released; Format: Digital download, streaming
Rockstar	Released: 2021; Label: Self-released; Format: Digital download, streaming
