= Federal Prison Camp, Duluth =

Prison in Minnesota, United States

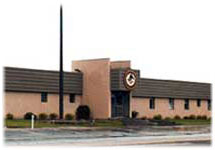

- Location within the United States Location within Minnesota
- Location: Saint Louis County, Minnesota; 46.835°N 92.195°W
- Status: Operational
- Security class: Minimum-security
- Population: 510 (April 2024)
- Managed by: Federal Bureau of Prisons
- Director: J. E. Krueger
- Website: bop.gov/locations/institutions/dth/

Notable prisoners
- Jerry Koosman, Stu Voigt

The Federal Prison Camp, Duluth (FPC Duluth) is a minimum-security federal prison in the north central United States, located in Minnesota for male offenders. It is operated by the Federal Bureau of Prisons, a division of the United States Department of Justice.

FPC Duluth is located on the former Duluth Air Force Base near the southwestern tip of Lake Superior, halfway between Minneapolis–St. Paul and the Canada–United States border, and seven miles (11 km) north of Duluth.

== Inmate life ==
On March 29, 2011, a reporter from a WCCO-TV interviewed Denny Hecker (15080-041), an inmate at FPC Duluth. Hecker, who made millions of dollars as the owner of car dealerships, was serving a 10-year sentence after pleading guilty to bankruptcy fraud in 2010. The reporter, Esme Murphy, described the interview:

He was dressed in surplus army fatigues from the 1960s, the uniform of all inmates... He described a life that to some might not sound so bad. He works out every day with weights in a fully equipped prison gym. He says the food is good. There is a salad bar and at times fresh cinnamon rolls for breakfast. There is a prison movie theater he can go to. The former auto mogul sleeps in a bunk bed in a room with three other men in a residential dorm-like building. Now he said "the minutes are like hours, the hours like days." Sometimes he spends hours looking at the planes fly overhead to the nearby Air Force base. In prison, he had his first job interview in more than 30 years. He wanted to teach business to other inmates, instead he was assigned to wash floors.

Hecker was later transferred to the Federal Correctional Institution, Loretto, a low-security facility in Pennsylvania with an adjacent minimum-security satellite prison camp. He was released July 3, 2018.

== Notable inmates (current and former) ==
Inmate Name	Register Number	Status	Details
Joshua Bellamy	73821-018	Released from custody in June 2023; served 17 months.	Former National Football League wide receiver who played 8 seasons in the league; pleaded guilty in 2021 to fraudulently receiving coronavirus relief loans.
Jerry Koosman	06864-090	Released from custody in June 2010; served 6 months.	Former Major League Baseball pitcher; pleaded guilty in 2009 to federal tax charges.
Stuart Levine	17852-424	Released from custody in August 2016; served 5 years.	Major campaign contributor for former Illinois Governor Rod Blagojevich; pleaded guilty to mail fraud and money laundering in 2012; testified for the prosecution at the trials of Blagojevich, Tony Rezko and William Cellini.
Tony Silva	06402-424	Released from custody in May 2002; served 7 years.	World-renowned expert on rare birds; convicted of conspiracy to commit wildlife smuggling and filing a false tax return.
Stu Voigt	18531-041	Released from custody in May 2017; served 6 months.	Former tight end with the Minnesota Vikings; in February 2016, a jury found Voigt guilty of aiding and abetting bank fraud.
Jasper Johnson	53991-511	In custody since July 28, 2026.	American rapper known professionally as Lil Shine. Johnson was sentenced in federal court and is known for his work in the pluggnb music scene.

== See also ==
- List of U.S. federal prisons
- Federal Bureau of Prisons
- Incarceration in the United States
