= Stomach Book =

American musician (born 2000)

Vivian Weeks
- Vivian Weeks setting up for a show in Reno in April 2026

Background information
- Born: Vivian Weeks; March 20, 2000 (age 26); South Bend, Indiana, US
- Origin: South Bend, Indiana, US
- Genres: Indie rock; experimental rock; indietronica; noise rock; noise pop; emo
- Occupations: Singer; Songwriter
- Instruments: Vocals; Harmonica; Guitar
- Years active: 2018-2020 (as Jibral) 2021–present (as STOMACH BOOK)
- Labels: Chillwave Records; CRASH BLOSSOMS; Spikechain Records

Vivian "Vivi" Weeks (born March 20, 2000), better known by her stage name STOMACH BOOK (stylized in all caps), is an American musician and songwriter from South Bend, Indiana. She is one of the most popular alternative transgender woman solo musicians with her having almost 180 million total streams on Spotify.

She has three albums and sixteen singles under "STOMACH BOOK" all of which were self-produced. She also has a backing band for live performances.

== Early life ==
Vivian was born in South Bend, Indiana, where she still lives to this day. Not much is known about her childhood other than a few bits of info from her time in high school, such as her being a high school champion wrestler in her state.

== Musical career ==
=== blunder years and CAT SOUP (2019–2020) ===
She began releasing music under the alias of "jibral" (stylized in all lowercase) nearing the end high school with 2 albums and 4 EPs. Her first album titled "blunder Years" was released in 2019 is primarily a Midwest emo album with a bit of experimental rock influence.

In 2020 she released "CAT SOUP" which acts as a demo album for music she would later release under the stomach book alias. She recorded the album in various locations on her laptop after she went on medical leave from college.

In 2022, a year after she moved on from the alias, she changed the cover art for her first two albums to be more in line with what she would release under STOMACH BOOK.

She has stated on Twitter that she considers jibral to be her deadname and wishes people do not refer to her under that name.

=== Current alias and STOMACH BOOK (2021) ===
She released her first ever single "Animals" under her current alias in January 2021. The song is a commentary on transphobia, comparing anti-transgender rhetoric to natural selection. She would later go on to release "We All Fall Down", "Requiem", "Ode", and "greetings from oblivion! we hope to see you soon!" as singles before the release of the album.

In October 2021 she released her self-titled debut "STOMACH BOOK." The album features a much more higher quality take on the sound she had on CAT SOUP and has lyrical themes of transphobia, gender dysphoria, social isolation, self-harm, and existentialism. The album gained a decent amount of critical and commercial success for an indie artist of her size at the time. She used the profits gained from sales of the album on Bandcamp was help pay off her student loan debt.

== Musical influences ==
STOMACH BOOK Performing at Thalia Hall in Chicago in 2026

Weeks is known for her experimental, maximalist tracks with emo, pitch-shifted vocals. which has been described as fifth-wave emo, noise pop, and indie rock.

She was primarily a metalhead when it came to music taste in high school before she discovered Chon which sparked her interest in emo and math rock.

== Discography ==
=== jibral ===
- blunder years (2019)
- CAT SOUP (2020)

=== STOMACH BOOK ===
- STOMACH BOOK (2021)
- Sophomore Slump Callithump (2024)
- Goodnight Hypnopomp (2025)
