= Nightcore =

Speeding up and pitch-raising a song

- Other names: Sped-up version; Sped-up remix; Sped-up song; Sped-up
- Stylistic origins: Eurodance; happy hardcore; J-core; anime song; trance; chipmunk soul
- Cultural origins: 2001, Norway
- Typical instruments: Audio editing software
- Derivative forms: Hyperpop; digicore; sigilkore; jerk; hexD

Other topics
- Anime music video

A nightcore edit (also known as a sped-up song, sped-up version, sped-up remix, or simply sped-up) is a version of a music track that speeds up its source material by approximately 35%, which also raises the pitch. This gives an effect almost identical to playing a 33⅓-rpm vinyl record at 45 rpm. The 35% increase in speed causes the note C_{4} to become slightly higher in pitch than the note F_{4} (from 261.63 Hz to 353.19 Hz), which is an increase of approximately 5 and one fifth semitones. Playing 33⅓-rpm vinyl records at 45 rpm was common in the Happy Hardcore scene of the 90s and 2000s, which most likely inspired this genre.

The name is derived from the Norwegian musical duo "Nightcore", who released pitch-shifted versions of trance and Eurodance songs. Nightcore is also almost always associated with and accompanied by anime and otaku culture; many YouTube thumbnails (and similar features) of nightcore remixes contain anime characters and art.

Nightcore saw a general resurgence in popularity in the early 2020s due to TikTok, causing major recording labels to officially release sped-up versions of their songs.

== History ==
"Everything Counts" by Depeche Mode

A nightcore edit of the song

=== 2000s ===
The term "nightcore" was first used in 2001 as the name for a school project by Norwegian DJ duo Thomas S. Nilsen and Steffen Ojala Søderholm, known by their stage names DJ TNT and DJ SOS respectively. The two were influenced by pitch-shifted vocals in German group Scooter's hardcore remixes of "Nessaja" and "Ramp! (The Logical Song)", stating in an interview that "[t]here were so few of these kinds of artists, we thought that mixing music in our style would be a pleasure for us to listen to" and that "[n]ightcore has become a style of music, a way to make the music happier – 'happy hardcore' as they say."

The duo set a template of a track in the style: a 25–30% speed-up (commonly to around 160 to 180 beats per minute) of a trance or Eurodance song. The nightcore music has been compared to happy hardcore and bubblegum bass because of its fast tempos, energetic feel, and high-pitched vocals. Nightcore made five albums of sped-up versions of trance recordings, including its 2002 thirteen-track debut album Energized and the group's later albums Summer Edition 2002, L'hiver, Sensación and Caliente. The group's first album was made with eJay, while all of its later work was made with what the duo described as "top-secret" programs. All of its records were sold to their friends and DJs around the group's area. Nightcore's works started appearing on services such as LimeWire in mid-2003 and YouTube in 2006. The first nightcore track to appear on the latter site was "Dam Dadi Doo" by the duo. Only two of the project's albums have surfaced on the Internet. One of the first people to distribute nightcore music on YouTube was a user going by the name Maikel631, beginning in 2008. The user uploaded about 30 original tracks by Nightcore on the Web site. In 2009, they found a "new" nightcore track, as well as the technique to make material in the style:

I came to the realization that Nightcore songs could be made by everyone, using reasonably simple audio software. I was at least one of the first people to really use that knowledge to make Nightcore edits. oShyGuyzo did this before me with Nightcore II. Another channel [that] I followed and started exploring fan-made Nightcore around the same time was Nasinocinesino.

=== 2010s ===
One of the first viral nightcore videos was for "Rockefeller Street", the song by Getter Jaani that was chosen to represent Estonia at the 2011 Eurovision Song Contest. The song became an internet meme after the nightcore version was posted to YouTube by a user known as Andrea, who was known as an osu! player. From there, the music rose in popularity with more people applying the nightcore treatment to more non-dance genres such as pop music and hip hop. Many of the pioneer uploaders of nightcore including Maikel631 have called these non-dance edits "fake". The nightcore scene then crossed over to SoundCloud with the help of artist lilangelboi, who had released around ten to fifteen edits on the service before signing with Manicure Records. The head of Manicure, Tom "Ghibli" Mike, recalled, "I just got totally obsessed with it. I put up that one he did, "Light"; we had him up here to DJ a few parties; and then he moved here. That was totally how nightcore became a thing for us." The label's #MANICURED playlist consisted of nightcore renditions of K-pop and electro house tracks, a few of them also incorporating production techniques outside of pitch-shifting and speeding up the source material, such as "Mile High" by Chipped Nails and Ponibbi and "Fave Hours" by F I J I.

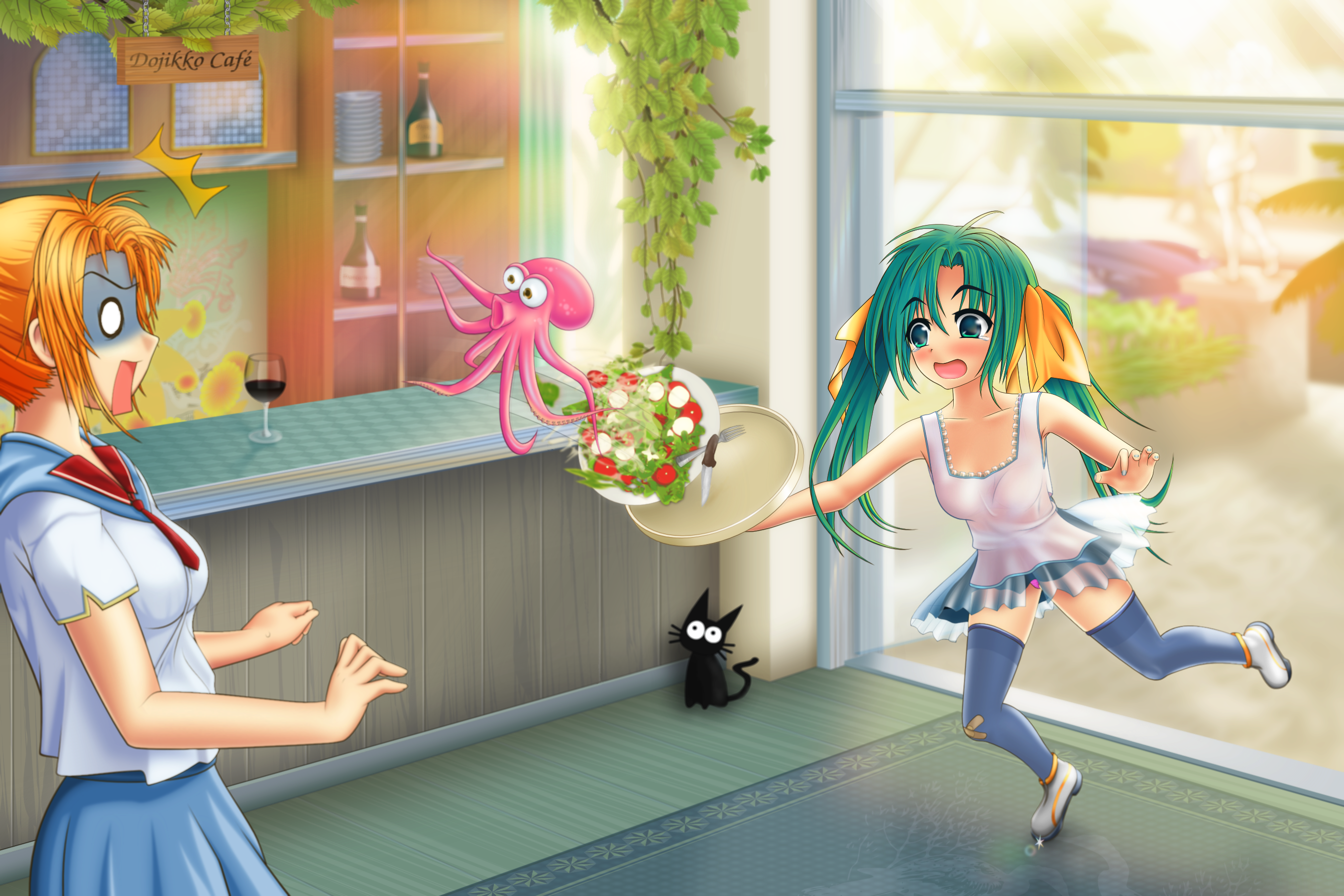
Images of anime-style artwork are most often used in thumbnails or box art for Nightcore music.

By the mid-2010s, the nightcore scene had garnered attention from musicians such as Djemba Djemba, Maxo and Harrison, Nina Las Vegas, Ryan Hemsworth, Lido, Moistbreezy, and PC Music founders Danny L Harle and A. G. Cook. Harle and Cook have claimed nightcore to be influences in interviews, the former saying in an interview:

From the second I first heard it, it's been so intensely emotional for me to listen to. I don't feel like it's an interaction from another human to me, it's just MP3 sound making me feel emotional in my head. With that kind of stuff, it's just a representation of heightened emotion for me.

A Thump writer described it as the "groundwork for some of the most innovative club music today" and wrote that it also led to a number of "awful" internet memes:

Throughout the late aughts and into the 2010s, it became the subject of a number of awful memes, and even an entry on KnowYourMeme.com, where a surprisingly extensive history of the music sits next to histories of trap and its infamous air horn sample. Like that iconic, oft-sampled sound, nightcore's inescapable appeal lies in loud, brash, low-brow fun, a heart-pounding blunderbuss of gooey, candy-coated sounds. It's an artifact indebted to an earlier, less formalized internet, one where file-sharing and forum culture reigned supreme, and where many aspiring producers first experienced the thrill of connecting with a larger community online.

Dance Music Northwest described nightcore as "too catchy, too danceable, and far too much fun to not welcome into the dance music mainstream."

=== 2020s ===
As social media platform TikTok rose to prominence in the 2020s, online music magazine Pitchfork noted: "Much of the music that performs well on TikTok has been modified slightly, either sped-up or slowed-down." Pitchfork quoted one nightcore TikTok creator: "Editors really enjoy sped-up music because edits with sped-up audios are much more energetic and interesting to watch." Nightcore has also gone under the more transparent name of "sped-up."

In 2022, a notable example was setting the dance routine performed by the titular character of the Netflix comedy horror series Wednesday to a nightcore version of the song "Bloody Mary" by Lady Gaga. The use of the song and fan recreations became a viral phenomenon on video sharing service TikTok and led to Netflix using the nightcore version in the announcement trailer for the show's second season.

In turn, major recording labels began releasing official sped-up remixes, gaining millions of streams. They either started releasing three versions (normal, sped-up, and slowed) of a track at the same time, or started curating popular Spotify playlists for sped-up versions of hit singles released specifically on their label (such as Warner Music Group).

== See also ==
- Hands up (music genre)
- Chopped and screwed
- Audio time stretching and pitch scaling
- Vaporwave
- Sigilkore
- Digicore
- HexD
- Slowed and reverb
- Anime song
