= Metro Zu =

American hip hop group

- Origin: Miami, Florida, U.S.
- Genres: Cloud rap; Alternative hip-hop
- Years active: 2007–2017
- Past members: Lofty305; Ruben Slikk; Freebase; Poshstronaut

Metro Zu was an American hip-hop group from Miami, Florida. It was formed in 2007 by Lofty305, Ruben Slikk and Freebase, with Poshstronaut joining later. The group released mixtapes independently, including Zuology (2012), and took part in Miami's Art Basel events. Members collaborated with Denzel Curry, Lil Peep, Yung Lean and members of Raider Klan, and the group has been cited as an influence by XXXTentacion and Lil Peep.

== History ==
Metro Zu formed in Miami in 2007. The group recorded much of its early material at Lofty305's mother's house in Miami Shores, which the members nicknamed the "Zu Mansion". Most were still underage and recorded there while their parents were at work. Some members later dropped out of high school.

Alongside their work as a group, the members pursued solo projects. Ruben Slikk formed Propr Boyz with rapper Mike Dece, one of Metro Zu's better-known side projects.

Outside music, Metro Zu members took part in Miami's annual Art Basel events, performing and exhibiting paintings, graffiti and photography. During the 2012 event, members spray-painted the Catalina Hotel and a Lamborghini. The car was reportedly later sold as an art piece for $250,000.

In 2013, Vice described Metro Zu's 2012 mixtape Mink Rug as "strangely addicting".

Lofty305 later appeared on "SPACEGHOSTPUSSY", a track with XXXTentacion, Denzel Curry and Ski Mask the Slump God. The song was a diss track aimed at SpaceGhostPurrp. In 2016, Ruben Slikk and Lil Peep released "Fuck Fame".

The members also released solo projects while continuing to work together as Metro Zu. Ruben Slikk formed the group Propr Boyz with rapper Mike Dece, one of the group's better-known side projects.

The group was also involved in Miami's Art Basel events. Its members performed and showed paintings, graffiti and photography at the yearly events. In 2012, members spray-painted the Catalina Hotel and a Lamborghini. The car was reportedly sold afterward as an art piece for $250,000.

In 2013, Vice described Metro Zu's 2012 mixtape Mink Rug as "strangely addicting".

Lofty305 appeared on "SPACEGHOSTPUSSY", a track with XXXTentacion, Denzel Curry and Ski Mask the Slump God. The song was a diss track aimed at SpaceGhostPurrp. In 2016, Ruben Slikk and Lil Peep released the song "Fuck Fame" together.

== Legacy ==
In 2023, Pitchfork included Metro Zu's 2012 mixtape Zuology in its list "Pitchfork Staffers on Their Most Formative Rap Albums". Alphonse Pierre wrote that the mixtape "simultaneously looks to the past and doesn’t give a damn about honoring it".

== Members ==
- Lofty305 (Robert Thompson): founding member
- Ruben Slikk founding member; formed the group Propr Boyz with rapper Mike Dece
- Freebase founding member
- Poshstronaut joined later

=== Lofty305 ===
Lofty305
- Born: Robert Thompson; June 5, 1991 (age 35); Miami-Dade County, Florida
- Genres: Cloud rap; Alternative hip-hop
- Occupations: Musician; rapper; visual artist; record producer
- Years active: 2007–present
- Formerly of: Metro Zu

Robert Thompson (born June 5, 1991), known as Lofty305, is an American rapper from Miami-Dade County, Florida. He is the younger brother of Ruben Slikk and one of the founding members of Metro Zu.

He has worked with Denzel Curry, Raider Klan, Yung Lean, Yung Sherman, King Krule, Thouxanbanfauni and Yung Beef.

== Discography ==
=== Mixtapes ===
- KushPak (2010)
- KushPak 2 (2010)
- ElectroZlapp (2010)
- Buddha Therapy (2011)
- C.S.P.G. (2011)
- Papes N' Vapes Volume 1 (with Shuttle Life) (2011)
- Mink Rug (2012)
- Heaven (2012)
- Zuology (2012)
- Z Unit (2013)
- If It Aint Fiji Bitch I Do Not Want It (2013)
- Drugs Inc Boyz (with Shuttle Life as Shuttle Zu) (2014)
- Welcome to Poshburger (with JaeGenius) (2014)

=== Compilations ===
- KushPak 3 (2013)

=== DJ mixes ===
- MetroZu Tropical $uper$lo Galaxy 1st Edition (2011)

=== Singles ===
- "Telepathy" (2010)
- "Slor" (2011)
- "CaterpillarZ" (2011)
- "Cokyo, Japan" (2011)
- "McLean" (2011)
- "CSPG" (2011)
- "Bong in the Bakpak" (2011)
- "94 Im Horny" (featuring Riley Reid) (2011)
- "Dippin" (2011)
- "LSD Swag" (2011)
- "Arab Bomber" (2011)
- "Posh Revolution" (2011)
- "Gold" (2011)
- "Yellow Ranger" (2011)
- "I Can Tamer" (2011)
- "Rub Ur Clit" (2011)
- "Act Rite" (2011)
- "Intricate Flap Circuitry" (2011)
- "Mink Rug" (2012)
- "Pantheon" (featuring Denzel Curry) (2012)
- "Yung Rug Munch" (2012)
- "Shuttlebang" (2012)
- "Smellin Like a Pimp" (2012)
- "Dip My Dick in Lean" (2012)
- "Dynasty Warriorz" (2012)
- "Ekans" (2012)
- "CHOPPRTEKNISHIN!" (2013)
- "Dade County Gang" (2013)
- "Pussy Fatt" (2013)
- "Babysitters Club" (2013)
- "Gather (Tiger Woods)" (2014)
- "Blakkguy" (2014)
- "Like Sushi" (2015)
- "Touchdown" (2015)
- "Pussy Psychik" (2015)
- "Im an Asshole" (featuring Mike Dece) (2015)
