= Sigilkore =

Subgenre of trap music

- Sample of "All Eyez on Me" by Luci4, showcasing common techniques within sigilkore-like sped & chopped mixing, bitcrushing, and trap drums
- Stylistic origins: Hip-hop; digicore; hexD; chopped and screwed; trap; cloud rap; electronic; hyperpop; nightcore
- Cultural origins: SoundCloud, Late 2010s, United States (Florida, California)
- Derivative forms: Krushclub

Fusion genres
- Vampjerk

Other topics
- Internet rap; jerk; vamp plugg; horrorcore; Memphis rap; microgenre; Internet aesthetic; 2k13 Hood EDM; underground hip-hop

Sigilkore is an Internet microgenre of hip-hop that emerged in the late 2010s, originally pioneered by American rapper and producer Luci4. The style is characterized by layered DJ mixing and digital effects such as bitcrushing and pitch shifting with lyrics relating to magic, deities, demons and occult rituals.

Drawing from cloud rap, hexD and chopped and screwed, it was developed in 2019 as a mixing style coined by American rappers Luci4 and Islurwhenitalk, who founded the music collective Jewelxxet. Luci4 drew influence from and was a member of SpaceGhostPurrp's collective BMB Deathrow. The style later led to the krushclub genre.

== Etymology and characteristics ==
The term "sigilkore" is derived from sigil, which is described as being associated with magic, deities and occult rituals. In sigilkore, lyrical themes mostly revolve around dark themes, including blood and vampires. The genre takes a blend of trap drums with a more ambient approach, faster tempos, and experimental mixing and mastering techniques. It was described as an experimental genre with no boundaries. The visual aesthetics of sigilkore draw influence from magic, deities, demons, and occult rituals. Luci4, a pioneer of the style, featured cover art lifted from the defunct GIF editing website Blingee. Writing for British newspaper The Guardian, music critic Alexis Petridis described sigilkore as a "micro-trend".

== History ==
=== 2019–2023: Origins ===
Sigilkore originated as a mixing style pioneered by rappers Luci4 and Islurwhenitalk who formed the collective Jewelxxet. South Florida rapper SpaceGhostPurrp, along with producers within his collective BMB Deathrow, laid the groundwork for what would later become sigilkore. A producer from BMB Deathrow by the name of 4jay (later renamed to Luci4) would expand upon this style by frequently including references to occultism within his cover art and lyrics. He is also credited with coining the term around 2019.

The genre exploded in popularity in summer 2021, when Luci4's songs "Bodypartz", "All Eyez on Me", and "Kurxxed Emeraldz" blew up on TikTok. The genre was also popularized by American singer Siouxxie's "Masquerade," which would go viral in mid-2021, and by artists Lumi Athena, Odetari, and 9lives in 2023.

==== Jewelxxet ====
Official Jewelxxet logo

Jewelxxet (stylized in uppercase) was an internet rap collective formed by rappers Luci4 and Islurwhenitalk. The collective was responsible for the emergence and popularization of sigilkore. Several notable artists later joined the group such as 2shanez, Sellasouls, MajinBlxxdy, Bacleo, Xaviersobased and St47ic.

== Related genres ==
=== Krushclub ===
Krushclub
- Stylistic origins: HexD; jersey club; hyperpop; sigilkore
- Cultural origins: 2020s, United States
- Derivative forms: Krush-jerk; krush-funk; krush-cumbia; krush-phonk

Other topics
- Electronic music

Krushclub is a subgenre of sigilkore, originating in the early 2020s, mixing jersey club elements with electronic sound qualities, known for its energetic sound and catchy beats. The style was pioneered by Luci4 with his song "Kurxxed Emeraldz". The term "krushclub" was coined by artist Lumi Athena to describe the fusion of jersey club music and bitcrushing effects. According to music journalist Kieran Press-Reynolds, writing for The Face, "there's krush-jerk and krush-cumbia, krush-funk and krush-phonk."

== See also ==
- Hyperpop
- Digicore
- HexD
- Nightcore
- Memphis rap
- Horrorcore
