= Lil Shine =

American rapper (born 2005)

- Johnson in 2026

Background information
- Born: Jasper William Johnson; February 18, 2005 (age 21); Robbinsdale, Minnesota, U.S.
- Genres: PluggnB; rage; trap
- Occupation: Rapper
- Years active: 2017–present
- Formerly of: Reptilian Club Boyz
- Website: www.lilshine.com
- Criminal information
- Status: Incarcerated
- Convictions: conspiracy to acquire controlled substances by fraud (1x); accessing a protected computer in furtherance of fraud (1x); and; aggravated identity theft (1x)
- Criminal charges: Conspiracy to acquire and obtain controlled substances by fraud (1x); attempt to acquire and obtain controlled substances by fraud (1x); wire fraud (11x); accessing a protected computer in furtherance of fraud (3x); and aggravated identity theft (4x)
- Penalty: 3 years in prison (36 months)
- Capture status: July 28, 2026

Details
- Date apprehended: December 3, 2024
- Imprisoned at: FPC Duluth (pleaded guilty to 3 out of 20 counts on January 20, 2026; sentenced May 19, 2026; surrendered to prison on July 28, 2026)

Jasper William Johnson (born February 18, 2005), known professionally as Lil Shine, is an American rapper and songwriter from Robbinsdale, Minnesota. Widely regarded as one of the most prominent figures in the pluggnB scene, he began his career in 2017 and has since released three studio albums, Losing Myself in 2022, Shine Forever in 2025, and Get Rich Or Die Sippin' in 2026.

== Early life ==
Jasper William Johnson was born on February 18, 2005, in Robbinsdale, Minnesota.

== Career ==
Johnson began to create music in 2017, at the age of twelve. He began to receive attention in 2019 after releasing the songs "Stop!" and "Relax!". Johnson joined the rap group Reptilian Club Boyz in 2020, remaining in the group until its disbandment in 2021. He collaborated with American rapper Summrs in 2023, on the single "Hop Out".

Johnson released his second studio album, Shine Forever, on January 1, 2025. He originally lost the laptop with the album files. On May 15, 2026, Johnson released Get Rich Or Die Sippin', which had two features from Summrs, and Kankan.

== Legal issues ==
=== August 2023 federal raid and music releases ===
Johnson was aware that he was the subject of a federal criminal investigation more than a year before his indictment. According to Johnson as he would explain to The Fader, the Marshals first detained Johnson temporarily at his Minneapolis apartment to execute a search on his room in August 2023. A few days later, he received a federal target letter notifying him that he was under investigation, although the letter did not specify the alleged offense. Johnson later stated that by late 2024 so much time had passed that he had "kind of forgot about it" until federal authorities searched his apartment again on December 3, 2024, and his attorney informed him later that day that he had been indicted.

While anticipating the possibility of imprisonment, Johnson continued recording music and released the singles "Str8 Like Dat", "Snakes", "Dork", and "Date Night" throughout 2024. "Dork", released on October 18, 2024, served as the lead single from his second studio album Shine Forever, which was released on January 1, 2025, several weeks after his arrest.

=== 2024 Indictment for buying and selling of promethazine and codeine ===
On November 26, 2024 Johnson and two others were federally charged with conspiracy to acquire and obtain controlled substances by fraud and attempt to acquire and obtain controlled substances by fraud after they were accused of hacking the Drug Enforcement Administration's practitioners and physicians system from December 2022 to August 2023 using stolen personal data from physicians to buy large amounts of promethazine and codeine with the intention to sell them. Johnson was additionally charged with 11 counts of wire fraud, 3 counts of accessing a protected computer in furtherance of fraud, and 4 counts of aggravated identity theft, which were not charged against his two co-defendants due to his alleged role in obtaining physicians' personal information, using it to access and change information on DEA systems, and buying said drugs under the physicians' names as part of the scheme.

==== Arrest and sentencing ====
The week after the indictment was filed, on the morning of December 3, 2024, federal marshals executed a search on Johnson's room at a Minneapolis apartment where he was staying at and placed him into custody. That afternoon, Johnson had posted bond and was released from jail that same day. When he heard from his attorney that same afternoon confirming that his charges were federal charges as part of a grand jury indictment, he would post to his Instagram story advocating for his fans to call for him to be "free" and took to a Discord community server to announce that he had been "federally indicted [that] morning." From there, word of his arrest spread quickly around underground music communities over the following days and his mugshot and charges would subsequently be published and circulate on social media. On December 16, 2024 after Johnson was released on bond, he went live on Instagram maintaining that he was innocent of the charges, and stating that he would continue to release music in spite of his criminal case. On January 20, 2026, Johnson entered a plea agreement. On May 19, 2026, Johnson announced on Instagram that he was sentenced to 36 months in prison. Johnson surrendered and began his sentence on July 28, 2026, and is currently incarcerated at Federal Prison Camp, Duluth.

== Influences and artistry ==
Johnson's music has been described as pluggnB, rage, and trap-inspired. Many of his songs are about his drug habits and relationships.

== Discography ==
=== Studio albums ===
Title	Details
Losing Myself	Released: October 31, 2022; Label: Self-released; Formats: Digital download
Shine Forever	Released: January 1, 2025; Label: Self-released; Formats: Digital download
Get Rich Or Die Sippin'	Released: May 15, 2026; Label: Self-released; Formats: Digital download

=== Mixtapes ===
Title	Details
SH!NE	Released: February 15, 2019; Label: Self-released; Formats: Digital download
Heavenly Ascension	Released: July 1, 2021; Label: Self-released; Formats: Digital download

=== Extended plays ===
Title	Details
Lovesick	Released: August 1, 2023; Label: Self-released; Formats: Digital download
Tearscape	Released: September 2, 2023; Label: Self-released; Formats: Digital download

=== Singles ===
Title	Year	Album
"Loser"	2021	Non-album single
"Snow Keep Fallin"	2022	Non-album single
"See U In H3ll"	2022	Non-album single
"Loose Ends"	2022	Non-album single
"By Myself" (with Lawsy)	2022	Non-album single
"Won't Stop"	2022	Non-album single
"Tell Me"	2022	Non-album single
"How Deep Is Your Love"	2023	Non-album single
"How It Goes"	2023	Non-album single
"Falling 4 You"	2023	Tearscape
"Lie Once, Lost Trust"	2023	Non-album single
"Too Bad"	2023	Non-album single
"Hop Out" (with Summrs)	2023	Non-album single
"Str8 Like Dat"	2024	Non-album single
"Snakes"	2024	Non-album single
"Dork"	2024	Shine Forever
"Date Night"	2024	Shine Forever
"Go Spin"	2025	Non-album single
"Sex Talk"	2025	Non-album single
"Fast Money"	2025	Non-album single

== Tours ==
- Lil Shine Farewell USA Tour (with Goonie)
