= Blingee =

Online animated GIF creator

- Website type: Subsidiary
- Products: GIF Platform
- Services: Creating, sharing, and browsing animated GIFs
- Parent: Picadelic
- Registration: Optional
- Current status: Defunct
- Native client on: Web browser

Blingee (founded 2006) was an online animated GIF creator platform that allowed users to create layered images using original photographs and artwork combined with user-generated ornamentation, referred to as "stamps."

== History ==
Blingee was founded as part of a website network Bauer Teen Network, and marketed towards young people who wished to add personalized imagery to their Myspace pages. The site, however, was different from other web-based GIF editors, allowing users to make their own profiles and other social network-like functionality. Users could also rate the Blingee compositions of others (referred to as "Blingees") and upload new artwork to use as stamps.

=== Closure and re-opening announcement ===
On August 14, 2015, Blingee announced that due to infrastructural and business model-related issues, the site would be closing down. The management offered users a way to download their work from the site, while many publications offered eulogies. However, a massive fan outcry ensued, leading to the site securing the funding to continue operations, which it announced August 19, 2015. The forum post also announced that several previously premium features would now be free for users.

In June 2024, Blingee was shut down and replaced with a message that "something new" was coming to replace the original website as well as promotion of Picadelic's other apps.

== Use in art and pop culture ==
Several prominent practitioners of internet art use Blingee as part of their practice or as an object of study, including Olia Lialina, Lorna Mills, and Mike Tyka.

The album art for M.I.A.'s single "XXXO" is meant to be a visual reference to Blingee, and the music video for the song features several headshots of the rapper pictured among glittering floral graphics like those common on the site.

== See also ==
- Decoden
- Kitsch
