= Cloud rap =

Music genre

- Sample of a cloud rap instrumental in the style of Clams Casino
- Other names: Trillwave
- Stylistic origins: Southern hip-hop; lo-fi; chillwave; trap; psychedelia; ambient; new age music; chillout; downtempo; video game music; anime soundtracks
- Cultural origins: Late 2000s, Southern United States
- Typical instruments: Vocals (Auto-Tune); Synthesizer
- Derivative forms: Emo rap; digicore; hexD; jerk; rage; UK underground; cloud rock

Other topics
- Soundcloud rap; chopped and screwed; phonk; plugg; witch house; internet rap; based rap; vaportrap; meme rap

Cloud rap (also known as trillwave) is a subgenre of hip-hop that emerged from the Southern hip-hop scene in the late 2000s to early 2010s. The style draws influences from trap, ambient and new age music to create a hazy, dreamlike, atmospheric and relaxed production style through the extensive use of reverb and ethereal chopped samples. It was originally pioneered by artists and producers such as Lil B, Clams Casino, Friendzone, Main Attrakionz, Viper, Metro Zu and SpaceGhostPurrp.

In 2010, music blogger Walker 'Walkmasterflex' Chambliss who co-founded the blog Space Age Hustle, coined the term "cloud rap" to describe the music of Main Attrakionz member Squadda B. The term was further popularized with their compilation album 3 Years Ahead: The Cloud Rap Tape. In 2011, the genre grew in popularity with the release of ASAP Rocky's debut single "Peso," followed by "Purple Swag" and his debut mixtape, Live. Love. ASAP, which saw production credits from Clams Casino as well as features from Main Attrakionz and SpaceGhostPurrp.

In 2013, Yung Lean released the single "Ginseng Strip 2002" which went viral online, further popularizing the style. His collective Sad Boys gained prominence in the cloud rap scene. Other notable artists such as Bones, Xavier Wulf, Chris Travis, Night Lovell and Black Kray would become prominent figures in the scene. Cloud rap influenced several internet rap genres such as emo rap, digicore, hexD, jerk, rage and sigilkore.

== Etymology ==
The various artists compilation album 3 Years Ahead: The Cloud Rap Tape (2010) popularized the term.

In 2010, music blogger Walker 'Walkmasterflex' Chambliss coined the term "cloud rap" in a Blogspot post describing the music of Main Attrakionz member Squadda B, whom he labelled "the king of cloud rap". The founders of the blog would later manage the duo. Chambliss thought he was using a phrase from a 2009 interview by music writer Noz, where rapper Lil B showed him a CGI image of a castle in the clouds and said "that's the kind of music I want to make." He later used the term for the Space Age Hustle blog's compilation album, 3 Years Ahead: The Cloud Rap Tape released in 2010, which helped popularize the genre.

The label "cloud" denotes distinct characteristics of the genre such as its "hazy", ethereal aesthetic (in terms of both aural and visual expression) and its ambiguity as a genre without clearly defined borders.

== Characteristics ==
Cloud rap is defined by the use of ethereal, psychedelic and soft samples as well as the inclusion of trap style drums, drawing primary influences from lo-fi hip-hop and chillwave. The genre's production style draws heavily from general mellow and relaxed sounds that are atypical to traditional hip-hop such as ambient and new age music, while esoteric melodic chopped samples have been lifted from J-pop, video game music and anime soundtracks.

Cloud rap's lyrics sometimes revolve around themes of love and betrayal, as well as more typical themes found in popular music such as sex, drugs, and alienation.

The style pulls from a diversity of rap sounds and locales: from both the East and West Coasts and the South. In particular, cloud rap often utilizes looped samples from downtempo, ambient, new age and chillout music, as well as British female singers such as Sade and Imogen Heap. Often, cloud rap is released independently of record labels, and cloud rap artists rely on internet services (such as SoundCloud, YouTube, and Twitter) to distribute and promote their music.

Cloud rap production is characterized by ethereal synths, reverb-heavy beats, distorted samples, and a chopped, lo-fi musical style. The genre leans heavily into melody, blending elements from various genres while maintaining a strong connection to hip-hop. With many of the genre's pioneers taking major influences from witch house and chillwave, many artists have producers in common like Clams Casino, 90's Bambino, and SpaceGhostPurrp.

== History ==
=== 2000s–2010s: Origins ===
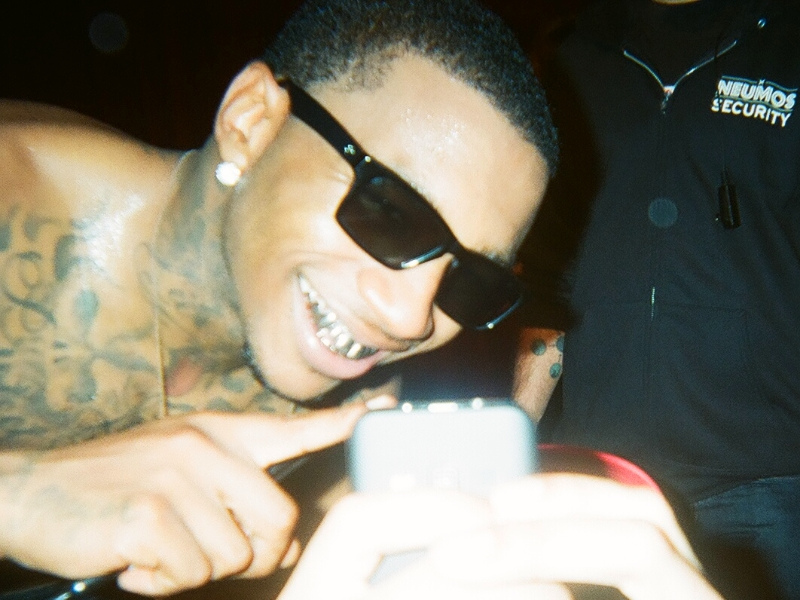
Lil B's collaborations with producer Clams Casino were key influences on the development of cloud rap.

Cloud rap originated in the Southern United States during the late 2000s. Elements of cloud rap appear as early as the 1990s, with the influence of the Houston and Memphis rap scene, as well as in the early 2000s with Clouddead's self-titled album which later inspired the Californian group Main Attrakionz. Rapper Danny Brown cited Main Attrakionz as the originators of the style, while defining the genre as "Imogen Heap samples". During the late 2000s, artists such as Lil B and producer Clams Casino, became key influences on the development of cloud rap, with the duo pioneering the sound as early as 2008. Other early developments included the underground Finnish rap scene and the work of Houston rapper Viper.

By 2010, Squadda B of Main Attrakionz, Friendzone and South Florida acts SpaceGhostPurrp and Metro Zu, were tagged cloud rap by online music critics and bloggers, though many artists expressed dislike for the term and distanced themselves from it. Cloud rap garnered mainstream attention in 2011 with rapper ASAP Rocky's debut single "Peso", which was followed by the single "Purple Swag" and mixtape, Live. Love. ASAP, which saw partial production credits from Clams Casino and Friendzone.

In 2013, Swedish artist Yung Lean became an eminent cloud rap artist when the video for his single "Ginseng Strip 2002" went viral. His collective Sad Boys gained prominence in the cloud rap scene. Notable producers who worked with Lean such as Yung Gud, Whitearmor and Suicideyear alongside online rap collective Drain Gang, consisting of Bladee, Ecco2k, Thaiboy Digital, and Whitearmor, would also be influential in shaping the genre.

Around the same time, other online rap collectives contributed to the genre’s development, such as Raider Klan (featuring SpaceGhostPurrp and Denzel Curry), ASAP Mob led by ASAP Rocky, Black Kray’s Goth Money, Seshollowaterboyz (Bones, Xavier Wulf, Chris Travis and Eddy Baker), and GothBoiClique (including Yung Bruh and Wicca Phase Springs Eternal). Other influential artists include Night Lovell, and the early work of Playboi Carti. By the late 2010s, the influence of cloud rap splintered off into various other genres such as emo rap, digicore, and rage.

=== 2020s ===
During the early 2020s, a new wave of artists drew influences from the original cloud rap era merging the sound with contemporaneous styles such as plugg music and various microgenres such as jerk, sigilkore and hexD. The work of artists such as Xaviersobased, Fakemink, Yabujin, 2hollis, and Smokedope2016 have been described as "cloud rap".

In 2025, the term "cloud rock" was introduced to describe a style of alternative rock derived from the influence of electronica and internet music genres such as hyperpop and cloud rap. Artists associated with the style include Dean Blunt, Quannnic, Chanel Beads, and Car Underwater.

== See also ==
- Internet rap
