= Internet music =

Music influenced by Internet culture

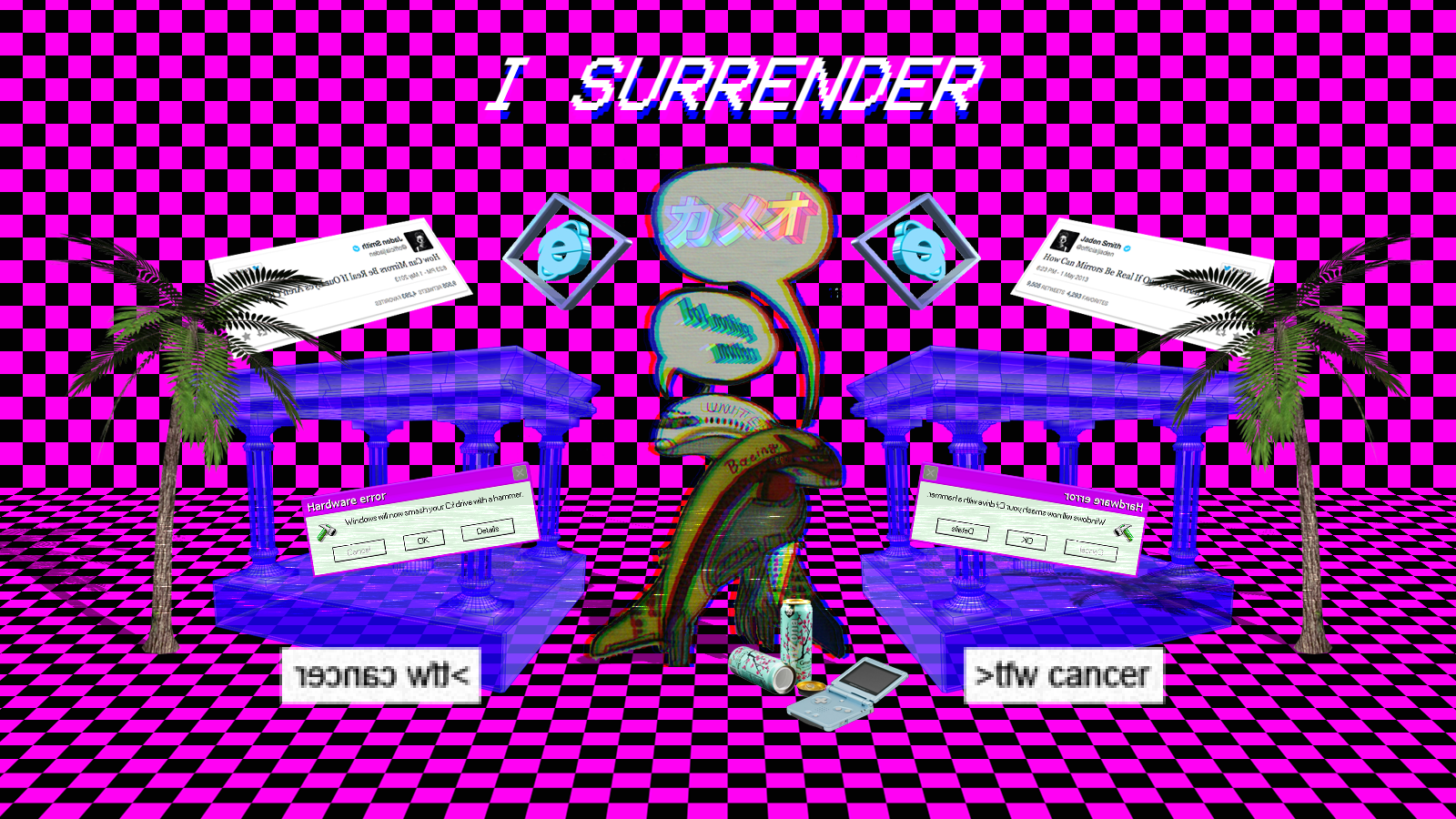
Vaporwave is among one of the most known Internet-centric microgenres and subcultures

Internet music (also known as online music, net music or digital music) is a style of music influenced by Internet culture and practices that originated from or were significantly shaped by the Internet, as well as encompassing a wide range of genres and music scenes that have developed primarily online, often outside traditional music industry structures.

The earliest roots of music made or distributed on the Internet can be traced back to the late 1980s and early 1990s amongst the tracker music community, Usenet and the demoscene. By the 2000s, several music scenes and genres would proliferate on the Internet through the early online blogosphere, most notable were hypnagogic pop, shitgaze, blog rock, bloghouse and blog rap. By the end of the decade, chillwave emerged as the first music genre to develop primarily on the Internet, the style heralded the early 2010s proliferation of Internet music microgenres, such as witch house and seapunk, along with vaporwave which originated as an ironic variant of chillwave. Several online music styles later emerged as microgenres frequently tied to specific Internet aesthetics.

Additionally, online forums and blog sites such as Blogspot, Last.fm, 4chan, Tumblr and Reddit alongside early social media platforms MySpace and mixtape-sharing site DatPiff helped provide early forms of independent online musical distribution, later followed by SoundCloud, YouTube, Spotify and TikTok. By the late 2010s and early 2020s, internet music genres such as hyperpop, digicore, hexD, sigilkore, dariacore and more gained popularity.

== History ==
=== 1980s–1990s: Forerunners ===
Internet music traces back to the late 1980s to early 1990s, beginning with the rise of tracker music, a form of digital audio files made on music trackers and shared online through early internet communities like Usenet. Tracker scenes helped establish norms around open sharing and online collaboration that would later shape broader internet music trends. Many tracker musicians gained international prominence within MOD software users and some of them went on to work for high-profile video game studios, or began to appear on large record labels. The Usenet newsgroup "alt.music" would focus on music submitted through the platform.

In 1990, the Residents released the CD-ROM The Residents: Freak Show. At the time, Todd Rundgren would also be credited as an early pioneer of Internet music distribution through self-made music videos and his interactive album No World Order.

In 1996, David Bowie released the single "Telling Lies", which was made exclusively available as an Internet download on his site BowieNet. The song was the earliest lyrical reference to the Internet in pop music, and its promotion campaign marked a landmark in online music distribution. The Guardian later stated that Bowie helped create a market for "digital music", his 1999 album Hours was first released online before reaching in-person stores. Bowie had been an early adopter of the Internet, reportedly using email as early as the late 1980s.

In 1997, Duran Duran's single "Electric Barbarella" became the first song by a major label artist to be available for digital purchase.

During the late 1990s, American rappers such as Canibus and Trick Daddy would set up sites and promote their music on the internet, with Canibus referencing the internet on his songs. Trick Daddy released the album www.thug.com. Other albums following this format include Pitchshifter's www.pitchshifter.com (1998) and Jethro Tull's J-Tull Dot Com (1999).

=== 2000s: Blog era ===
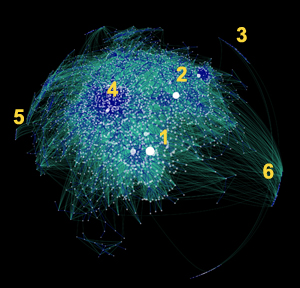
An artist's depiction of the interconnections between blogs and blog authors in the "blogosphere" in 2007

By the early 2000s, the growing prominence of the internet saw the emergence of music proliferated through the early online blogosphere, characterized by genres and scenes such as bloghouse, blog rock, and blog rap. The post-noise underground also known as the Blogspot scene would develop around this period alongside hypnagogic pop and shitgaze.

These styles were heavily circulated through the Millennial blogosphere and music forums, with sites like MySpace and Tumblr playing a critical role in promoting artists and shaping early internet-based scenes. At the time, "Myspace metalcore" and "Tumblr pop-punk" became underground scenes which emerged purely from bands distributing their music on those sites. Mixtape-sharing platforms like DatPiff also became hubs for early internet rap scenes including the blog rap movement.

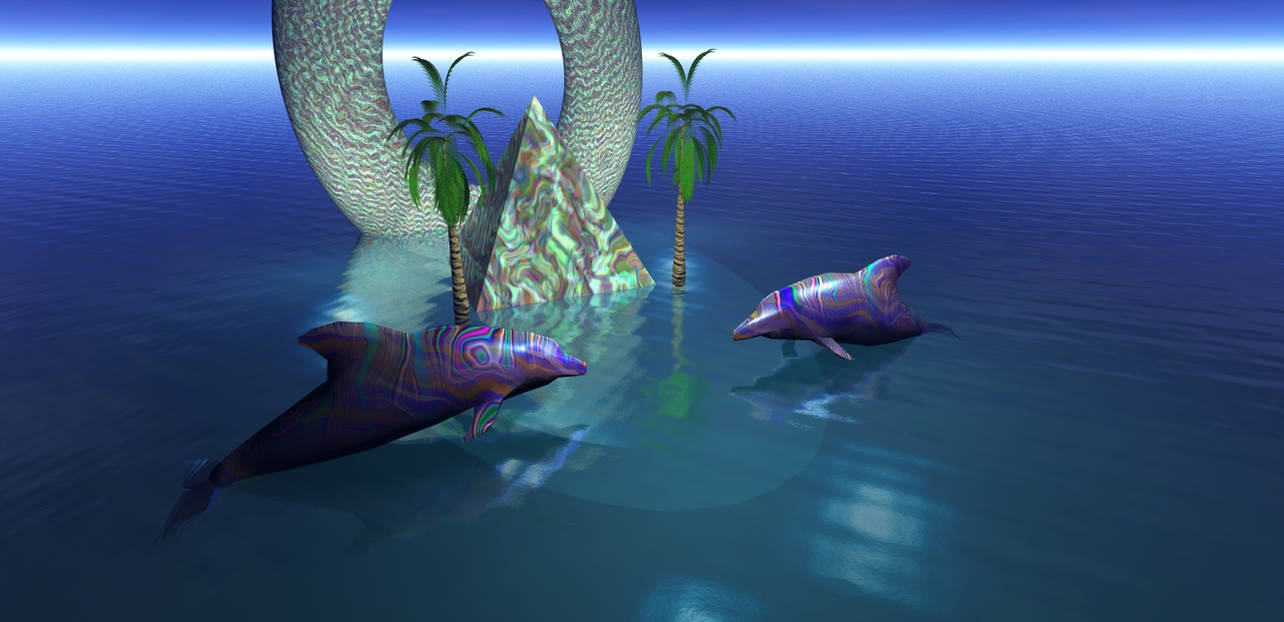
Example of seapunk aesthetic

=== 2010s ===
In 2010, Oneohtrix Point Never released the album Eccojams Vol. 1 (under the pseudonym Chuck Person), quickly followed by Floral Shoppe by Macintosh Plus, spawning the musical genre and digital art movement Vaporwave, which explores late 1990s and early 2000s computer graphics, as well as the corporate advertising styles of the 1980s, and is considered by many to be the first "wholly virtual" musical genre.

In 2013, A. G. Cook started the label PC Music, with the aim to "make music on the computer that had personality". Like vaporwave, the label re-interpreted the "least cool" aesthetics from previous decades; where vaporwave drew from 1980s and 1990s advertising themes, PC Music focused on 90s musical genres like Eurodance, Happy hardcore, and Bubblegum music. PC Music embraced online platforms, releasing their first tracks on SoundCloud.

As the scene progressed into the late 2010s, the genre began to be referred to as Hyperpop, a term coined in 1988 to describe the band Cocteau Twins, but repurposed by Spotify data scientist Glenn McDonald to describe the duo 100 gecs. The genre was celebrated for its democratic nature thanks to accessibility of the tools used to create and distribute it, including Audacity and SoundCloud.

Into the later 2010s the prevalence of streaming as a musical medium continued to affect the culture and industry in all genres, with Chance the Rapper shouting out SoundCloud after winning best new artist at the 2017 Grammy Awards, something only possible following a rules change that allowed streaming-only albums to be eligible for nomination.

In 2019 both Charli by Charli XCX, and Pang by Caroline Polachek were released, both described as "cornerstones" of the hyperpop genre. In the same year Spotify created the now famous playlist "Hyperpop", featuring music by 100 gecs and A. G. Cook, which spread specifically through the internet based channels of social media including TikTok.

=== 2020s ===
In the early 2020s, hyperpop was popularized as an influential leading genre in the online music space.

In 2024, Rolling Stone described the online underground rap scene as "extremely online," which included acts such as Nettspend, Xaviersobased and Yhapojj. These artists often found success online through TikTok, Instagram and YouTube.

Pitchfork credited the American netlabel Dismiss Yourself as an internet music "forager".

== See also ==
- List of Internet music genres
- Post-Internet – 21st century art movement
- Plunderphonics – Music genre
- Blogspot scene – 2000s music scene centered on online service Blogspot
- -core – Suffix used for aesthetics
- Chiptune – Style of synthesized electronic music
- Internet art – Form of art distributed on the Internet
- Net.art – Group of artists that use the Internet as their medium
- 21st century music – One hundred years, from 2001 to 2100
- Postmodern music – Music of the postmodern era
- Metamodernism – Movement that emerged from and reacts to postmodernism
- Computer music – Application of computing technology in music
- Music technology (electronic and digital)
- Digitality – Condition of living in a digital culture
- Mashup (music) – Composition blending prerecorded tracks
- MIDI – Connection standard for electronic musical instruments
- Music streaming service – Type of online service for consuming music
- Remix culture – Culture encouraging the creation of derivative works
- Music and artificial intelligence – Usage of artificial intelligence to generate music
- Digital audio workstation – Device or software used for recording, editing and producing audio files
- Anime song – Music genre
