= Bitcrusher =

Digital audio effect

A bitcrusher or bit crusher is an audio effect that produces distortion by reducing the resolution or bandwidth of digital audio data. The resulting quantized noise may produce a "harsh" or a "filtered" sound impression, depending on whether or not it is interpolated. Bitcrushing is a core effect in glitch, lo-fi electronic, and chiptune music.

== Methods ==
A typical bitcrusher uses two methods to reduce audio fidelity: sample rate reduction and resolution reduction.

=== Sample rate reduction ===
Sample rate reduction
Adjusting a bitcrusher by varying only the sample rate

Digital audio is composed of a rapid series of numeric samples that encode the changing amplitude of an audio waveform. To accurately represent a wideband waveform of substantial duration, digital audio requires a large number of samples at a high sample rate. The higher the rate, the more accurate the waveform; a lower rate requires the source analog signal to be low-pass filtered to limit the maximum frequency component in the signal, or else high-frequency components of the signal will be aliased. Specifically, the frequency of sampling (a.k.a. the sample rate) must be at least twice the maximum frequency component in the signal; this maximum signal frequency of one-half the sampling frequency is called the Nyquist limit.

Though it is a common misconception that the sample rate affects the "smoothness" of the digitally represented waveform, this is not true; sampling theory guarantees that up to the maximum signal frequency supported by the sample rate (i.e. the Nyquist limit), the digital (discrete) signal will exactly represent the analog (continuous-wave) source, except for the distortion of quantization noise resulting from the finite precision of the individual samples. The original signal can be exactly reconstructed simply by passing the low-pass discrete signal through an ideal low-pass filter (with a perfect vertical cutoff profile). However, as an ideal filter is impossible to build, a real filter, with a gradual transition between the passband and the stopband, must be used, with the consequence that it is impossible to accurately record all frequencies right up to the Nyquist limit for a given sample rate. The solution is to increase the sample rate by an amount that accommodates the transition bands of the filters used both for sampling and for continuous-wave reconstruction; this is why, for example, Compact Discs use a sampling rate of 44.1 kHz to record audio that seldom exceeds 20 kHz, even though the Nyquist limit for this sample rate is 22.05 kHz. Another consideration is that for perfect reconstruction, the samples should be rendered as ideal impulses of infinitesimal duration, but all real hardware generates rectangular pulses for the samples; some lower-quality digital-to-analog conversion devices use step-wave conversion, which essentially outputs the samples as rectangular pulses that have a duration equal to the sampling period. In this case, too, an increase in the sample rate can reduce and compensate for the resultant distortion. Even so, it cannot be overemphasized that, regardless of its motivation, an extra margin added to the sampling frequency does not make the reconstructed waveform smoother; it merely prevents aliasing of the frequencies in the transition band to lower frequencies, which would distort the signal nonlinearly.

DAWs today typically use 44.1 kHz or higher sample rates. Early digital equipment used much lower sample rates to conserve memory for stored audio. A Speak & Spell from 1979, for instance, used an 8 kHz sample rate.

Sample rate reduction (also called down-sampling) intentionally reduces the sample rate to degrade the quality of the audio. As the sample rate is reduced, high frequencies are aliased or, if the digital signal is first low-pass filtered, they are lost. If a primitive step-wave DAC is used, or if the DAC filter cutoff frequency is not adjustable to track with the sample rate, but instead is fixed at half the Nyquist frequency for the maximum supported sample rate, then waveforms also become more "coarse" sounding. At extreme reductions, the waveform becomes metallic sounding as a result of severe aliasing and perhaps nonlinear distortion from poorly tuned digital-to-analog conversion. (Note that all of these effects are avoidable if the signal is low-pass filtered before being downsampled and if the DAC parameters for playback are proper to the reduced sample rate; then the waveform sounds band-limited, with a quality comparable to a telephone, an AM radio with clear reception, or a magnetic tape recorder at a slow tape speed.)

=== Resolution reduction ===
Resolution reduction
Adjusting a bitcrusher by varying only the bit depth

Samples in digital audio are recorded as integers or floating-point numbers stored in digital memory. Those numbers are encoded using a series of on and off memory bits. The larger the number of bits, the more accurately a sample encodes the instantaneous volume level of a sampled audio waveform. DAWs today typically use 32-bit floating-point numbers because they are more suitable for successive layered processing and mixing, but the final master output usually consists of 16-bit or 24-bit integer samples. Early digital audio gear and video games used 8-bit integer samples or fewer. Roland's classic TR-909 drum machine used 6-bit integer samples. The number of bits used in each sample directly affects the signal-to-noise ratio and dynamic range of the digital signal, specifically by determining the amplitude of a kind of noise called quantization noise that is similar to low-pass-filtered white noise.

Resolution reduction intentionally reduces the number of bits used for audio samples. As the bit depth goes down, waveforms become noisier and subtle volume variations are lost, reducing dynamic range at the low end. At extreme bit reduction, waveforms are reduced to clicks and buzzes (square waves) as a waveform jumps abruptly from low to high and back again without intervening values, with many lower peaks flattened out to zero amplitude.

== Principal controls ==
Bitcrusher effects usually have at least two controls: one reduces the sample rate, while the other reduces the resolution.

The knob or slider for resolution reduction (a.k.a. "bit depth", "depth", or "bits") usually adjusts from 32 bits down to 1 bit.

LossyWAV software by David Robinson and Nick Currie calculates the minimum bit depth to represent each segment of a PCM waveform without audible distortion. Though it is intended as a preprocessor for reducing bit rates in audio compression, pushing the quality setting lower produces bitcrush distortion.

The control for sample rate reduction (a.k.a. "downsampling" or "averaging") is sometimes shown in Hz for a new sample rate, or as a reduction factor. Sample rate reduction is sometimes shown instead as the number of consecutive samples to average together to create a new sample. A value of 20 reduces the sample rate to 1/20 of its original rate.
