= 2025 in hip-hop =

This article summarizes the events, album releases, and album release dates in hip-hop for the year 2025.

== Events ==
=== January ===
- On January 1, A.D.O.R. died at the age of 55.
- On January 15, Drake filed a federal defamation lawsuit against UMG over the release and promotion of claims made in Kendrick Lamar's diss track "Not Like Us".
- On January 20, Nelly, Snoop Dogg, Rick Ross, and Soulja Boy performed at President Donald Trump's Inauguration Ball.
- On January 21, the trial began for ASAP Rocky on charges of assault with a deadly weapon after allegedly shooting former affiliate ASAP Relli in 2021.
- On January 22, Barry Michael Cooper died at the age of 66.
- On January 24, DJ Unk died at the age of 43.
- On January 31, YFN Lucci was released from prison.

=== February ===
- On February 2, the 67th Annual Grammy Awards were held. Kendrick Lamar won Record of the Year, Song of the Year, Best Music Video, Best Rap Song, and Best Rap Performance for "Not Like Us". Rapsody and Erykah Badu won Best Melodic Rap Performance for "3:AM". Doechii won Best Rap Album for Alligator Bites Never Heal. Roxanne Shante received the Lifetime Achievement Award.
- On February 5, Irv Gotti died at the age of 54.
- On February 7, Naâman died at the age of 34.
- On February 9, Kendrick Lamar headlined the Super Bowl LIX halftime show at the Caesars Superdome in New Orleans, Louisiana, with guest performer SZA, which became the most watched halftime show, surpassing the Super Bowl XXVII halftime show with headliner Michael Jackson.
- On February 10, Terror Danjah died at the age of 45.
- On February 13, Delcat Idengo was shot and killed in Goma.
- On February 15, the 32nd Hanteo Music Awards were held. RM won the Special Award – Hip-hop.
- On February 18, the MOBO Awards 2025 were held. Darkoo won Best Female Act and Song of the Year with Dess Dior for "Favourite Girl". Central Cee won Best Male Act. Bashy won Best Hip-hop Act and Album of the Year for Being Poor Is Expensive. Scorcher won Best Grime Act. Pozer won Best Drill Act. On the same day, ASAP Rocky was found not guilty on charges of assault with a deadly weapon.
- On February 20, the Premio Lo Nuestro 2025 were held. Feid won Male Urban Artist of the Year. Karol G won Female Urban Artist of the Year and Urban Album of the Year for Mañana Será Bonito (Bichota Season). Peso Pluma and Anitta won Urban Song of the Year for "Bellakeo". Bad Bunny won Best Urban Trap/Hip Hop Song for "Mónaco". Bad Bunny and Feid won Urban Collaboration of the Year won "Perro Negro".
- On February 21, Khalil Fong died at the age of 41.
- On February 22, the 56th NAACP Image Awards were held. Doechii won Outstanding New Artist. Kendrick Lamar won Outstanding Hip Hop/Rap Song and Outstanding Music Video/Visual Album for "Not Like Us".
- On February 27, the 22nd Korean Music Awards were held. B-Free & Hukky Shibaseki won Best Rap & Hip-Hop Album for Free Hukky Shibaseki & the God Sun Symphony Group: Odyssey.1. G-Dragon won Best Rap & Hip-Hop Song for "Power".

=== March ===
- On March 1, the Brit Awards 2025 were held. Stormzy won Best Hip Hop/Grime/Rap Act.
- On March 3, Beau Dozier died at the age of 45.
- On March 5, DJ Funk died at the age of 54.
- On March 13, J. B. Moore died at the age of 81.
- On March 17, UMG filed a motion to dismiss Drake's federal defamation lawsuit over the claims made in "Not Like Us", stating that "he has sued his own record label in a misguided attempt to salve his wounds." On the same day, the 2025 iHeartRadio Music Awards were held. Kendrick Lamar won Hip-Hop Song of the Year for "Not Like Us". GloRilla won Hip-Hop Artist of the Year. BossMan Dlow won Best New Hip-Hop Artist. Future and Metro Boomin won Hip-Hop Album of the Year for We Don't Trust You. Stray Kids won K-Pop Album of the Year for Ate. Nelly received the iHeartRadio Landmark Award.
- On March 19, the 2025 MTV Video Music Awards Japan were held. Yuki Chiba won Best Hip Hop Video for "Team Tomodachi". XG won Best Visual Effect for "Woke Up".
- On March 22, Jay Whiss died at the age of 32. Sayso P was killed and Sauce Walka was injured in a shooting in Memphis, Tennessee.
- On March 24, NBA YoungBoy was released from federal prison.
- On March 27, Jemini the Gifted One died.
- On March 28, Young Scooter died at the age of 39.
- On March 30, the Juno Awards of 2025 were held. Snotty Nose Rez Kids won Rap Album/EP of the Year for Red Future. Jessie Reyez and Big Sean won Rap Single of the Year for "Shut Up". bbno$ won the Fan Choice Award. AP Dhillon won South Asian Music Recording of the Year for The Brownprint. Boi-1da received an International Achievement Award.

=== April ===
- On April 5, Pasha Technique died at the age of 40.
- On April 16, Drake filed an amended complaint in the defamation lawsuit filed against UMG earlier this year to include complaints about Kendrick Lamar's Super Bowl halftime performance.
- On April 30, the APRA Music Awards of 2025 were held. Lithe won Most Performed Hip Hop / Rap Work for "Fall Back".

=== May ===
- On May 8, Xatar died at the age of 43.
- On May 10, Kafon died at the age of 42.
- On May 13, Rodney-O filed a lawsuit against Metro Boomin, Future and Kendrick Lamar, alleging unpaid royalties and lack of proper clearance of "Everlasting Bass" that was sampled for "Like That".
- On May 17, Werenoi died at the age of 31. On the same day, Kendrick Lamar and SZA's concert in Lumen Field, Seattle, as part of the Grand National Tour became the highest-grossing hip-hop concert, making $14,811,000 in revenue.
- On May 21, the 2025 Music Awards Japan were held. Creepy Nuts won Song of the Year, Best Japanese Song, Top Japanese Song in Europe, Top Japanese Song in Latin America, Top Japanese Song in North America, Best Japanese Hip Hop/Rap Song, Best Japanese Dance Pop Song, and Best Viral Song for "Bling-Bang-Bang-Born" and Best Japanese Hip Hop/Rap Artist. Nujabes won Best Instrumental Song for "Aruarian Dance". Kendrick Lamar won Best International Hip Hop/Rap Song in Japan for "Not Like Us". Megan Thee Stallion and RM won Best of Listeners' Choice: International Song for "Neva Play".
- On May 23, Sacha Jenkins died at the age of 53.
- On May 26, the American Music Awards of 2025 were held. Eminem won Favorite Male Hip-Hop Artist and Favorite Hip-Hop Album for The Death of Slim Shady (Coup de Grâce). Megan Thee Stallion won Favorite Female Hip-Hop Artist. Kendrick Lamar won Favorite Hip-Hop Song for "Not Like Us". Doechii won Social Song of the Year for "Anxiety".
- On May 28, NBA YoungBoy, sentenced to 2 years in jail for gun-related crimes, was pardoned by president Donald Trump.
- On May 29, the 2025 Aotearoa Music Awards were held. David Dallas won Best Hip Hop Artist.

=== June ===
- On June 4, the 2025 Premios de la Academia de Música were held. Nathy Peluso won Best Urban Music Album for Grasa, Best Rap/Hip Hop Song for "Aprendar A Amar", Best Urban Song for "Manhattan" with Duki, and Best Fusion/Urban Performance for "Todo Roto" with Ca7riel & Paco Amoroso. On the same day, the 2025 Brazilian Music Awards were held. Emicida won Best Rap/Trap Artist. MV Bill won Best Rap/Trap Release for Na Visão do Morador.
- On June 9, the BET Awards 2025 were held. Kendrick Lamar won Album of the Year for GNX, Video of the Year for "Not Like Us", Best Collaboration alongside SZA for "Luther", Video Director of the Year alongside Dave Free, and Best Male Hip Hop Artist. Doechii won Best Female Hip Hop Artist. Future and Metro Boomin won Best Group. Snoop Dogg and Kirk Franklin received the Ultimate Icon Award. On the same day, the 2025 Libera Awards were held. Shygirl and Saweetie won Best Hip-Hop/Rap Record for "Immaculate". De La Soul won Best Sync Usage for "Say No Go" in the film Civil War. MF Doom won Creative Packaging and Best Reissue for MM..FOOD (20th Anniversary Edition) and Best Remix for "One Beer" (Madlib Remix).
- On June 11, Silentó was sentenced to thirty years in prison for murder charges relating to the 2021 death of his cousin, Frederick Rooks.
- On June 16, Dave Scott died at the age of 52.
- On June 18, the 27th Annual Premios Gardel were held. Trueno won Best Urban Album for El Último Baile and Best Urban Song for "Real Gangsta Love". Nathy Peluso & Ca7riel & Paco Amoroso won Best Urban Collaboration for "Todo Roto".
- On June 21, the 34th Seoul Music Awards were held. RM won the R&B/ Hip-hop Award.
- On June 24, XXL released their 2025 Freshman Class, including Ray Vaughn, BabyChiefDoit, Eem Triplin, 1900Rugrat, Samara Cyn, Ian, Gelo, Loe Shimmy, Lazer Dim 700, YTB Fatt, Nino Paid, and EBK Jaaybo.
- On June 26, Ocasional Talento died at the age of 29. Takutai Tarsh Kemp died at the age of 50.

=== July ===
- On July 2, Sean Combs was convicted on two counts of transportation to engage in prostitution, but was acquitted of two counts of sex trafficking and one RICO charge.
- On July 4, Outlawz member Young Noble died by suicide at the age of 47.
- On July 17, Robbie Pardlo died at the age of 46.
- On July 18, Cash Out was convicted of sex trafficking, racketeering and aggravated sodomy; he was sentenced to life plus 70 years in prison.
- On July 31, Jesto died at the age of 40. On the same day, the AIR Awards of 2025 were held. Miss Kaninna won Best Independent Hip Hop Album or EP for Kaninna and Breakthrough Independent Artist of the Year. Nick Herrera won Independent Mix, Studio or Mastering Engineer of the Year for Kaninna.

=== August ===
- Ex Tuuttiz died.
- On August 2, Howie Tee died at the age of 61.
- On August 9, the National Indigenous Music Awards 2025 were held. Barkaa won Album of the Year for Big Tidda.
- On August 21, Lil Nas X was arrested for misdemeanor battery on a police officer and briefly hospitalized for a suspected drug overdose in Los Angeles.

=== September ===
- Omen died at the age of 49.
- On September 6, the 77th Primetime Creative Arts Emmy Awards were held. Kendrick Lamar and Tony Russell won Outstanding Music Direction for The Apple Music Super Bowl LIX Halftime Show Starring Kendrick Lamar.
- On September 7, the 2025 MTV Video Music Awards were held. Doechii won Best Hip Hop and Best Choreography for "Anxiety". Kendrick Lamar won Best Cinematography for "Not Like Us". Busta Rhymes received the Rock the Bells Visionary Award.
- On September 28, Marcyliena Morgan died at the age of 75.

=== October ===
- On October 3, Sean Combs was sentenced to 50 months in prison for his Mann Act convictions.
- On October 6, Ray's Kim Edm died at the age of 36.
- On October 7, Pooh Shiesty was released from federal prison.
- On October 9, Drake's defamation lawsuit against UMG over Kendrick Lamar's "Not Like Us" was dismissed.
- On October 14, DJ Chosen Few died at the age of 53.
- On October 21, the Filipino Music Awards 2025 were held. Morobeats won Hip-hop Song of the Year for "Gubat na Siyudad". J-Hope won the People's Choice Awards – International Artist.
- On October 24, P.E.A.C.E. of Freestyle Fellowship died at the age of 51.
- On October 30, the 2025 UK Music Video Awards were held. A$AP Rocky won Video of the Year and Best Hip Hop / Grime / Rap Video – International, Best Production Design in a Video, Best Cinematography in a Video, and Best Visual Effects in a Video for "Tailor Swif". Kae Tempest won Best Hip Hop / Grime / Rap Video – UK for "Statue in the Square". Archy Moor won Best Hip Hop / Grime / Rap Video – Newcomer for "Robbery Rings". Doechii won Best Performance in a Video for "Denial Is a River". Yung Lean won Best Styling in a Video for "Forever Yung". Mac Miller won Best Animation in a Video for "Balloonerism".
- On October 31, Alicia Andrews was found guilty of manslaughter for the murder of Foolio.

=== November ===
- On November 1, Young Bleed died at the age of 51.
- On November 3, Blueface was released from prison.
- On December 6, the 10th Asia Artist Awards were held. Stray Kids won Album of the Year for Karma.
- On November 7, the Los 40 Music Awards 2025 were held. Rels B won Best Spain Urban Act. Mora won Best Global Latin Urban Act. Feid won Best Global Latin Tour or Concert for Fastest Tour and the Colombian Phenomenon Award.
- On November 8, Outkast and Salt-N-Pepa were inducted into the Rock and Roll Hall of Fame.
- On November 9, Max B was released from prison.
- On November 13, the 26th Annual Latin Grammy Awards were held. Trueno won Best Rap/Hip Hop Song for "Fresh".
- On November 16, Maxon Margiela died at the age of 21.
- On November 19, the 2025 ARIA Music Awards were held. Barkaa won Best Hip Hop/Rap Release for Big Tidda. The Kid Laroi won Song of the Year for "Girls".
- On November 20, Pras was sentenced to 14 years in prison on 10 counts, including conspiracy and acting as an unregistered agent of a foreign government.
- On November 28, the 2025 MAMA Awards were held. G-Dragon won Artist of the Year, Best Male Artist, Best Dance Performance – Male Solo for "Too Bad". Stray Kids won Album of the Year for Karma. Jennie won Best Dance Performance – Female Solo for "Like Jennie". Big Naughty won Best Rap & Hip Hop Performance for "Music". Cortis won Best New Artist.

=== December ===
- On December 2, Poorstacy died at the age of 26.
- On December 11, Junior King died.
- On December 14, the 31st Annual South African Music Awards were held. 25K won Best Hip Hop Album for Loyal to the Plug: The Life & Times of Don Kilograms.
- On December 19, Eye-Kyu died at the age of 55.
- On December 20, Michał Urbaniak died at the age of 82. The 2025 Melon Music Awards were held. G-Dragon won Artist of the Year, Best Male Solo, Best Songwriter, Album of the Year for Übermensch, and Song of the Year for "Home Sweet Home". Woodz won the Hot Trend Award. Zico won Best Producer.

== Released albums ==
=== January ===
Day	Artist(s)	Album	Record label(s)	Entering chart position
1	03 Greedo	2025: The Streetz is Over Wiit	Self-released	
1	Cannibal Ox	Aireplane	IGC	
1	Duwap Kaine	Nobody Is Coming To Save You	TAF	
1	Edward Skeletrix	Museum Music	Self-released	
1	Lil Shine	Shine Forever	Self-released	
3	Boldy James & RichGains	Murder During Drug Traffic	Self-released	
3	Jon Connor	Food for the Soul	Self-released	
3	Lil Baby	WHAM	Quality Control Music	Debuted at No. 1 on the Billboard 200
3	Various artists	Death Row Revue	Death Row Records, Gamma	
5	Bad Bunny	Debí Tirar Más Fotos	Rimas	Debuted at No. 2 on the Billboard 200
8	Ransom	Cabrini Green	Black Soprano Family, Momentum	
8	Wolfacejoeyy	Cupid	Self-released	
10	Diamond D	The Diam Piece 3: Duo	Dymond Mine Records	
10	Doseone & Steel Tipped Dove	All Portrait, No Chorus	Backwoodz Studioz	
10	Quinton Barnes	Code Noir	Self-released	
10	Rilès	Survival Mode	Self-released	
10	Rio da Yung OG	Rio Free	#Boyz	Debuted at No. 157 on the Billboard 200
10	Skiifall	Lovers Till I'm Gone	Self-released	
10	The Heatmakerz	The Anti-Social Experiment	Self-released	
10	Ziak	Essonne History X	Errro, Chrome Castle	
11	Wiley	Boom Bap Vol 4	Self-released	
17	Busta Rhymes	Dragon Season... The Awakening	Conglomerate	
17	Logic	Aquarius III	BMG Rights Management	
17	Mac Miller	Balloonerism	Warner	Debuted at No. 3 on the Billboard 200
17	Mick Jenkins	Type Shit	Self-released	
17	Myss Keta	Myss Keta	Island Records, Universal Music Italia	
17	OMB Peezy	Drifting Away	Overkill, Hitmaker	
17	Philthy Rich	Real, Rich & Respected	FOD	
17	Riff Raff	Welcome to Shaolin	Castles of Chrome, Black 17	
17	Verbal Jint	Happy End	Otherside	
17	Wu-Syndicate	Wu-Rona Virus	Self-released	
20	Got7	Winter Heptagon	Kakao	
21	YGTUT	Wash My Hands	The House	
22	24hrs & King Kobi	24hrs on Saturn	NORP	
23	Da Uzi	Original Gangsta	Warner France	
23	Zillionaire Doe	D Boi Dreams	CMG, Interscope	
24	Benjamin Booker	Lower	Fire Next Time, Thirty Tigers	
24	Boldy James	Permanent Ink	Royal House	
24	Central Cee	Can't Rush Greatness	Columbia	Debuted at No. 1 on the UK Albums Chart; Debuted at No. 9 on the Billboard 200
24	Damon Dash & Freeway	365	Self-released	
24	Ghais Guevara	Goyard Ibn Said	Fat Possum	
24	Homeboy Sandman	Rich 2.5	Dirty Looks	
24	Hunxho	For Us	300	
24	Jeshi	Airbag Woke Me Up	Because	
24	Jordan Adetunji	A Jaguar's Dream	300 Entertainment, Warner UK	
24	Krizbeatz	Daddy Daycare	Streets Legend, ONErpm	
24	Moka Only & Reckonize Real	More Vibes & B-Sides	Real Deff	
24	OsamaSon	Jump Out	Atlantic Records, Motion Music	Debuted at No. 151 on the Billboard 200
24	Uncle Murda	Murda He Wrote	ATM, Empire	
24	Young Franco	It's Franky Baby!	Neon	
24	Youssoupha	Amour Supreme	99 Revolution, AllPoints	
27	Eunhyuk	Explorer	ODE, Dreamus	
27	Pink Siifu	Black'!Antique	Dynamite Hill	
30	Young Dro & Zaytoven	10 Piece Hot	Grand Hustle	
31	BabyTron	Song Wars	Hip Hop Lab, Empire	
31	Canibus	The Almighty Era V2: The Final Chapter	Q&A Logistics, 1332 Records	
31	Damon Locks	List of Demands	International Anthem	
31	Don Trip	Gladiator	MRVL Music Group	
31	EST Gee	I Aint Feeling You	CMG, Interscope	Debuted at No. 97 on the Billboard 200
31	FearDorian	Leaving Home	Self-released	
31	Iniko	The Awakening	Columbia, Audio Angel	
31	Madrox	More Music You Don't Wanna Hear From Someone You Barely Like	Majik Ninja Entertainment	
31	Madvillain	Madvillainy Demos	Stones Throw	
31	Mike	Showbiz!	10k	
31	The Weeknd	Hurry Up Tomorrow	XO, Republic	Debuted at No. 1 on the Billboard 200
31	V Don	Sent For	Black Soprano Family, Roc Nation Distribution	

=== February ===
Day	Artist(s)	Album	Record label(s)	Entering chart position
4	Nino Paid	Love Me as I Am	Signal, Columbia	
5	Creepy Nuts	Legion	Onenation, Sony Music Associated	
5	Luhh Dyl	Intrude	300	
6	Nardo Wick	Hold Off	Flawless Ent, RCA Records	
7	Krept and Konan	Young Kingz II	Play Dirty	Debuted at No. 86 on the UK Albums Chart
7	Larry June, 2 Chainz & The Alchemist	Life Is Beautiful	The Freeminded Records, ALC Records, Empire	Debuted at No. 89 on the Billboard 200
7	Montana 700	700 Reasons	Remain Solid, 300 Entertainment	
7	Robb Banks	Tha Leak 3	Self-released	
7	Soulja Boy	The Influence	SODMG	
7	Sy Ari da Kid	The Last Shadow In The Shade	No I In Team Records, Cinq Music Group	
7	Tyga	NSFW	Last Kings, Empire	
7	Yung Fazo	ZO	Capitol Records	
7	ZelooperZ & Real Bad Man	Dear Psilocybin	Real Bad Man Records	
12	A$AP Twelvyy	I Did More With Less	Two Twelve Technologies	
12	Capella Grey	U Miss Me Yet?	Allepac the Family, 10K Projects	
12	Coi Leray	What Happened to Forever?	Trendsetter Studios, Sony Music Entertainment	
12	Hurricane Wisdom	Perfect Storm	Open Shift Distribution	Debuted at No. 126 on the Billboard 200
12	P-Lo	For the Soil	Everywhere Like Air, Golden State Entertainment, Empire	
13	Black Milk & Fat Ray	Food from the Gods	Computer Ugly	
14	Bartees Strange	Horror	4AD	
14	Brother Ali & Ant	Satisfied Soul	Mello Music Group	
14	D. Savage	We Love D. Savage	Empire	
14	Don Trip	King of Hearts	MRVL Music Group	
14	Dro Kenji	Love Kills	10K Projects	
14	Flau'jae	Flau & B	Flauge Entertainment	
14	Jacquees & DeJ Loaf	Fuck A Friendzone 2	Yellow World, FYB Records	
14	John Glacier	Like a Ribbon	Young	
14	M Huncho	U2opia	MYB, 10K Projects	Debuted at No. 30 on the UK Albums Chart
14	Nems	America's Sweetheart	Goliath Records	
14	OhGeesy	Paid N Full	Atlantic	
14	PartyNextDoor & Drake	Some Sexy Songs 4 U	OVO Sound, Republic Records	Debuted at No. 1 on the Billboard 200
14	Rizzle Kicks	Competition is for Losers	BMG UK	Debuted at No. 59 on the UK Albums Chart
14	Skaiwater	#Mia	GoodTalk, Capitol	
14	Westside Gunn	12	Griselda Records	
14	Yung Bleu	What Makes Us Human	Moon Boy Music	
17	Eem Triplin	Melody of a Memory	RCA	
21	BlocBoy JB	The Purple M&M 2	Self-released	
21	Blockhead	It's Only A Midlife Crisis If Your Life Is Mid	Future Archive	
21	Cartel Bo	Pablo	Big Persona, Warner	
21	Elcamino & 38 Spesh	Martyr's Prayer III	Perfect Time	
21	Iann Dior	Nothings Ever Good Enough II	Big Noise	
21	Mike Posner	The Beginning	Arista	
21	Morray	Long Story Short	Empire	
21	Nardo Wick	Wick	Flawless Entertainment, RCA Records	
21	Paris Texas	They Left Me with the Sword	Self-released	
21	Ransom & Dave East	The Final Call	FTD, Momentum	
21	Saint Jhn	Festival Season	Godd Complexx	
21	Smif-N-Wessun	Infinity	Bucktown USA, Duck Down Music	
21	Stalley	Gamla Kyrkogatan	Blue Collar Gang	
22	Dorcci	Young Morvarid	Love6boyz	
25	G-Dragon	Übermensch	Galaxy, Empire	
27	Boldy James & Chuck Strangers	Token of Appreciation	Self-released	
28	1300Saint	All Hail	YSL Records	
28	1900Rugrat	Porch 2 the Pent	Remain Solid, 300	
28	Busta Rhymes	Dragon Season... Equinox	Conglomerate	
28	Desiigner	Be Me	LOD	
28	Fridayy	Some Days I'm Good, Some Days I'm Not	Lost In Melody, Def Jam	Debuted at No. 51 on the Billboard 200
28	Jim Jones	At the Church Steps	Hitmaker Music Group	
28	Lil Tony	Born Again	Priority, UMG	
28	Lisa	Alter Ego	Lloud, RCA	Debuted at No. 7 on the Billboard 200
28	NSG	The Big 6	10K Projects	
28	Paris Texas	They Left Me with a Gun	Self-released	
28	Reason	I Love You Again	Do More Records, 195 Oak	
28	Shygirl	Club Shy Room 2	Because	

=== March ===
Day	Artist(s)	Album	Record label(s)	Entering chart position
3	Che Noir & Superior	Seeds in Babylon	Poetic Movement	
4	KenTheMan	Kinda Famous	Self-released	
6	Sneakbo & Stickz	Still On Plan A	Self-released	
7	6ix	Homebody	Self-released	
7	Apollo Brown	Elevator Music	Escapism Recordings	
7	Capo Lee & Big Zuu	Signed & Delivered	Legacy Living	
7	Cookin' Soul & Ankhlejohn	The Michelin Man	Self-released	
7	De La Soul	Clear Lake Audiotorium (Re-release)	Chrysalis Records	
7	Evilgiane & Harto Falión	The Hurtless	Surf Gang	
7	Fredo Bang & TEC	8 Legged Gorilla	Create Music Group	
7	Icewear Vezzo	Undefeated	Iced Up	
7	Ill Tone Beats & Black Soprano Family	The Outcome	Black Soprano Family	
7	Jennie	Ruby	Odd Atelier, Columbia	Debuted at No. 7 on the Billboard 200
7	Lord Finesse	The SP 1200 Project: Sounds & Frequencies in Technicolor	Underworld Label Group, Coalmine Records	
7	Mg Lil Bubba	Bub's Burgers	Create Music Group, GGR	
7	Slim Thug & Propain	Double Cup	Hogg Life, Double Trill	
7	Steel Banglez	One Day It Will All Make Sense	Mass Appeal, Gifted	
7	TobyMac	Heaven on My Mind	ForeFront, Capitol CMG	Debuted at No. 157 on the Billboard 200
7	Tokimonsta	Eternal Reverie	Young Art	
7	Tory Lanez	Peterson	One Umbrella	Debuted at No. 25 on the Billboard 200
7	YoungBoy Never Broke Again	More Leaks	Never Broke Again, Motown	Debuted at No. 29 on the Billboard 200
14	B.G.	Freedom Of Speech	Choppa City, Santa Anna	
14	Clipping	Dead Channel Sky	Sub Pop	
14	Curren$y & Harry Fraud	Never Catch Us	Jet Life Recordings	
14	Dano	Nuevos Trapos	Sony	
14	DeeBaby	Ms. Salazar	Already Platinum, Create Music Group	
14	Finesse2tymes	Stuck In My Ways	Mob Ties, Bread Gang, Atlantic	
14	Insyt	Dancing by Myself	Empire	
14	Jasiah	No Holds Barred	New 11	
14	K Camp	Built Different	Rare Sound	
14	OJ da Juiceman	Oj Da Juiceman, Pt. 2	32	
14	Playboi Carti	Music	AWGE, Interscope Records	Debuted at No. 1 on the Billboard 200
14	Rojuu & Evilgiane	62Starz	Surf Gang	
14	Rose Villain	Radio Vega	Warner Music Italy	
15	Starlito	Regretfully	Grind Hard	
15	Young Buck	Renovation	Cashville	
18	Kanye West	Bully V1	YZY	
18	Masiwei	The Lottery	A Few Good Kids	
18	Saba & No I.D.	From the Private Collection of Saba and No I.D.	ARTium	
18	Smoke DZA	The Barcelona Tape	RFC Music Group	
19	Kevin Gates	I'm Him 2	Bread Winners Alumni	Debuted at No. 63 on the Billboard 200
20	PlaqueBoyMax	London	Self-released	
21	Bishop Nehru	Now Or Never	Nehruvia	
21	B.U.G Antman	Y'all Ugly	Marki, Warner	
21	Goya Gumbani	Warlord of the Weejuns	Ghostly International	
21	Gunplay	Almost Free	X-Ray Records	
21	Jehkai & Kalan.FrFr	Cost of Love	Grade A Productions	
21	Masio Gunz	Masey Baby	MNRK	
21	Money Man	Insomnia	Black Circle, Empire Distribution	
21	Previous Industries	Evergreen Plaza	Merge	
21	Scorey	If You Feel Lost	Columbia Records, Sony Music Entertainment	
21	Stray Kids	Mixtape: Dominate	JYP, Republic	
22	KRS-One	Temple of Hip Hop Global Awareness	R.A.M.P Ent Agency	
24	Sylvan LaCue & Our Heroes Rock	The Heroes of STEM!	Our Heroes Rock	
25	Reuben Vincent & 9th Wonder	H.M.W.Y.G.H. (Hit Me When You Get Here)	Self-released	
27	Joeboy	Viva Lavida	Young Legend, Warner Music Africa	
28	Babyfxce E	M Block	Atlantic	
28	Backxwash	Only Dust Remains	Ugly Hag	
28	Boldy James & Antt Beatz	Hommage	Empire	
28	DaBoii	Heart of a Lion	Empire	
28	Deko	Eclipse	DreamsOnline	
28	Elcamino	Up The Block	Black Soprano Family	
28	Lil Durk	Deep Thoughts	Alamo	Debuted at No. 3 on the Billboard 200
28	Lil' Keke	Legend Hotel	Slfmade 713, SoSouth	
28	Lil Nas X	Days Before Dreamboy	Columbia	
28	Lord Sko	Piff	Uptown Sh!t, Stimulated, Roc Nation	
28	Nav	OMW2 Rexdale	XO, Republic	Debuted at No. 37 on the Billboard 200
28	Nemzzz	Rent's Due	Self-released	Debuted at No. 6 on the UK Albums Chart
28	Poptropicaslutz!	The new 925	Epitaph	
28	Q Marsden	10 Songs	Boy Meets Euphoria, Columbia	
28	Sada Baby	Bridge Kard Blessings	Big Squad, Groundwerk, BMG	
28	Termanology & Bronze Nazareth	Things I Seen	Black Day In July	
28	Timbaland	Timbo Progression	Mosley Music, Gamma	
28	Vory	You Made Me This Way	Ikonic Global	
28	Will Smith	Based on a True Story	Rave In The Wasteland, Slang	
28	Willie the Kid & Real Bad Man	Midnight	Real Bad Man Records, The Fly	
28	Yung Beef & Goa	Traumatismo Kraneoencefalico 2	La Vendicion	
29	Lil' Flip & Z-Ro	Kingz of the South, Vol. 2	1 Deep Ent, Clover G	
30	Kota the Friend	No Rap on Sunday	Self-released	
31	Autumn!	B2MR	Self-released	
31	Odumodublvck	The Machine Is Coming	Kalacious, Native, Def Jam	

=== April ===
Day	Artist(s)	Album	Record label(s)	Entering chart position
1	ABGR Lil Cory	Act Broke Get Rich	Signal, Columbia	
1	Luh Kel	Better Late Than Never	Different Vibes Only, Frvr	
2	Bloodhound Q50	Long Live My Brudda He Prolly Kilt Yo Brudda	Grade A Productions	
2	BunnaB	Ice Cream Summer	Artist Partner Group	
2	Duckwrth	All American FuckBoy	Stem	
3	Black Sherif	Iron Boy	Blacko Management, Empire	
3	Corbin	Crisis Kid	September	
3	Eladio Carrión	Don Kbrn	Rimas	Debuted at No. 32 on the Billboard 200
4	2hollis	Star	Interscope	
4	Ant	Collection of Sounds Vol. 4	Rhymesayers	
4	Boldy James & V Don	Alphabet Highway	Serious Soundz, RRC Music	
4	DJ Koze	Music Can Hear Us	Pampa	
4	Infinity Knives & Brian Ennals	A City Drowned in God's Black Tears	Self-released	
4	Jace!	Greenway	Simple Stupid Records, UMG	
4	Jane Remover	Revengeseekerz	DeadAir	
4	Lou Phelps	Chèlbè	Celestial Morals	
4	Mbnel	Epoch	Empire	
4	Shoreline Mafia	Back in Bidness	300, Atlantic	Debuted at No. 182 on the Billboard 200
6	LaRussell & Mike G Beatz	Make Hip-Hop Fun Again!	Good Compenny, Empire	
7	Mark	The Firstfruit	SM, Kakao	
8	Ampers&One	Wild & Free	FNC	
8	Bb trickz	80'z	Sony Music España	
8	DJ Fokus & Chino XL	Map of Bones	Magician Records, Holy Toledo	
8	RXKNephew	Slither Not Slime	GetYouKilledRecords	
11	Berner	Carbon	Three Brothers, Compound Interest	
11	Bliss n Eso	The Moon (The Light Side)	Flight Deck, Mushroom	Debuted at No. 1 on the ARIA Charts
11	Cortisa Star	E.M.O. (Evil Motion Overload)	Open Shift	
11	Deante' Hitchcock	Good Things Take Time	Do Better Records, 195 Oak	
11	KayCyy & Sign Crushes Motorist	Saddest Truth	BuVision, Columbia	
11	Ken Carson	More Chaos	Opium	Debuted at No. 1 on the Billboard 200
11	Yung Bans	Before RR	Newilluminessence, 1of1	
12	Del the Funky Homosapien & Thegoodnews	This Just In	Nature Sounds	
12	Wu-Tang Clan & Mathematics	Black Samson, the Bastard Swordsman	Ruffnation Entertainment	
17	Cappadonna	Godly Wealthy & Beautiful	GLF	
18	Bfb Da Packman	That's Brilliant!	The Lunch Crew Company	
18	Blu & August Fanon	Forty	Nature Sounds	
18	Chip	Grime Scene Saviour	Cash Motto	
18	Dave Blunts	You Can't Say That	Listen to the Kids	
18	G Perico & DJ Drama	LA Gangster	Empire	
18	Kool Keith	Karpenters	Post Up Music, Fat Beats	
18	Lupe Fiasco	Ghotiing MIT	Self-released	
18	Millyz	Blanco 7	Create	
18	Mozzy	Intrusive Thoughts	Empire	
18	Scrim	Via Crucis	G59 Records	Debuted at No. 194 on the Billboard 200
18	Swizz Beatz	Godfather of Harlem: Season 4 (Soundtrack)	Epic, Sony	
18	That Mexican OT & Sauce Walka	Chicken & Sauce	STB Entertainment	
18	The Underachievers	Homecoming	Slang	
18	Too $hort	Sir Too $hort, Vol. 1 (Freaky Tales)	Dangerous Music, Empire Distribution	
18	Westside Gunn	Heels Have Eyes	Griselda Records	
18	Wiz Khalifa	Kush + Orange Juice 2	Taylor Gang, Asylum Records	Debuted at No. 62 on the Billboard 200
20	Chillinit	The Green Room	420 Family	
23	BabyChiefDoit	Zoo Life	Artist Partner Group	
23	Warhol.SS	Free Andy III	3200, FRVR	
24	Kai Ca$h	Cash Rules	Generation Now, Atlantic	
25	1300Saint	Saint Season	YSL Records	
25	Belly Gang Kushington	The Streets Is Yours	LVRN	
25	DaBaby	Please Say DaBaby, Vol. 1	Self-released	
25	Fly Anakin	(The) Forever Dream	Lex Records	
25	Lil Double 0	IOU1	Freebandz	
25	Mike Dean	425	MWA, Decent	
25	MoneySign Suede	Mi Familia Por Vida	The Machine Works, Atlantic	
25	MRG	It's MRG Not Mr.G	Eastvilla, Empire	
25	Ray Vaughn	The Good The Bad The Dollar Menu	Top Dawg	
25	Vinnie Paz	God Sent Vengeance	Iron Tusk	
29	Pap Chanel	The Girl Next Door	1865	
30	Lloyd Banks	AON 3: Despite My Mistakes	Money by Any Means	

=== May ===
Day	Artist(s)	Album	Record label(s)	Entering chart position
2	Ben Kenobe	Up In Smoke	Made by God, UnitedMasters	
2	Benny the Butcher	Excelsior	Black Soprano Family	
2	Boldy James & Real Bad Man	Conversational Pieces	Real Bad Man Records	
2	DDG	Blame the Chat	Epic	Debuted at No. 131 on the Billboard 200
2	Fatoni, Edgar Wasser & Juse Ju	Bawrs	Warner Music Central Europe	
2	Flume & JPEGMafia	We Live in a Society	Self-released	
2	Jimmie D & Nicholas Craven	Good Music Hypnotizes	Self-released	
2	Key Glock	Glockaveli	Paper Route Empire, Republic Records	Debuted at No. 8 on the Billboard 200
2	OMB Peezy & FBLManny	OverKrash	Overkill, FBL, Blac Noize!, Hitmaker	
2	Ro$ama	Orange Tape	600, UnitedMasters	
2	Scarlxrd	Traplxrd	LXRD	
2	Teether & Kuya Neil	Yearn IV	Chapter Music	
2	Tha Alkaholiks	Daaam!	Cleopatra Records	
2	Wretch 32	Home?	AWAL	
2	Youngs Teflon	Keep The Change	Warner Music UK, Atlantic	
2	Yung Lean	Jonatan	World Affairs, AWAL	
7	Knowledge The Pirate & Roc Marciano	The Round Table	Treasure Chest, Pimpire	
7	Mike & Tony Seltzer	Pinball II	10K Projects	
9	Billy Woods	Golliwog	Backwoodz Studioz	
9	Forrest Frank	Child of God II	River House Records, 10K Projects	Debuted at No. 12 on the Billboard 200
9	Lefty Gunplay & JasonMartin	Can't Get Right	OTR, 50million, Futuristic, Empire	
9	Starlito & Don Trip	Step Brothers 4 Life	MRVL, Grind Hard, Connect	
14	Chuckyy	I Live, I Die, I Live Again	Santa Anna	
15	Snoop Dogg	Iz It a Crime?	Death Row Records, Gamma.	
16	Aminé	13 Months of Sunshine	CLBN, 10K Projects	
16	Chuck D	Enemy Radio: Radio Armageddon	Soundspeak, Def Jam	
16	DRAM & Ellis Quinn	Leorpio	Waver, OneLand	
16	Dyme-A-Duzin	Solely Yours	Making Lots-A-$$$$	
16	Kilo Kish	Negotiations	Independent Co	
16	Lecrae & Miles Minnick	Get Well Soon!	Reach	
16	Lucy Bedroque	Unmusique	DeadAir	
16	Rico Nasty	Lethal	Fueled by Ramen, Atlantic Records	
16	Saint-Michel	Les Infinis (Soul Jazz Poetry)	Tonton Max, Believe	
16	Tee Grizzley	Forever My Moment	300	
16	Tha God Fahim & Nicholas Craven	Ultimate Dump Gawd	Self-released	
16	Valee & Harry Fraud	Egonomics	SRFSCHL, Fake Shore Drive	
16	Xzibit	Kingmaker	Greenback Records	
18	Kodak Black & G6Reddot	Zap Stars	Self-released	
21	Kirko Bangz	Choose Self	APR Blueblood	
22	Rob49	Let Me Fly	Rebel, Geffen	Debuted at No. 180 on the Billboard 200
23	Boldy James & Your Boy Posca	Magnolia Leflore	Near Mint	
23	Cola Boyy	Quit To Play Chess	Record Makers	
23	DJ.Fresh & The Musalini	Live and Let Fly	Perfect Time	
23	Fredo Bang	The Big Bang	Empire	
23	G-Eazy	Helium	RCA	
23	Kuru	Stay True Forever	DeadAir	
23	Pan Amsterdam	Confines	Heavenly Recordings, PIAS	
23	PlaqueBoyMax	Atlanta	5$tar, UMG, Field Trip, Capitol	
26	Tha God Fahim & Nicholas Craven	Hyperbolic Time Chamber Rap 12	Self-released	
27	Tobi Lou	Diabolical <3	Free Agency	
30	Aesop Rock	Black Hole Superette	Rhymesayers	Debuted at No. 171 on the Billboard 200
30	Benji Blue Bills & Bnyx	Out The Blue	Self-released	
30	Bruiser Wolf	Potluck	Fake Shore Drive, Bruiser House	
30	Coyote	Yotelandia	Smoker's Club	
30	EBK Jaaybo	Don't Trust Me	Encore	
30	GoldLink	Enoch	RBC Records, BMG	
30	Luh Tyler	Florida Boy	Motion, Atlantic	
30	Masta Killa	Balance	Nature Sounds	
30	Molly Santana	Molly and Her Week of Wonders	Victor Victor	
30	Ovrkast	While The Iron Is Hot	IIIXL Studio	
30	PlaqueBoyMax	Five Forever	5$tar, UMG, Field Trip, Capitol	
30	Rome Streetz & Conductor Williams	Trainspotting	The Influenyce Enterprise, Station, Mass Appeal	
30	Rx Papi	Sexy Wave for You Girls 2	Dawg Shit Records	
30	Yung Bans	Real Rockstar	Newilluminessence, 1of1	

=== June ===
Day	Artist(s)	Album	Record label(s)	Entering chart position
2	Thirstin Howl III	The Last Shall Be Thirst	Skillionaire	
3	Odetari	Varia 0.5	Artist Partner Group	
5	Day1	4 Now	DB Music, Warner Music Australia	
6	Chicken P	Lights, Camera, Action	Really Rich Empire, 10K Projects	
6	Cypress Hill & The London Symphony Orchestra	Black Sunday Live at the Royal Albert Hall	Mercury	
6	Jeleel!	Nyash Worldwide!	Real Raw	
6	Joey Purp & Thelonious Martin	Champagne Seats	Fake Shore Drive	
6	Lil Kayla	I'm Just A Girl	Empire	
6	Lil Wayne	Tha Carter VI	Young Money Entertainment, Republic Records	Debuted at No. 2 on the Billboard 200
6	Little Simz	Lotus	AWAL	Debuted at No. 3 on the UK Albums Chart
6	McKinley Dixon	Magic, Alive!	City Slang Records	
6	Quinton Barnes	Black Noise	Watch That Ends The Night	
6	Sada Baby	Black Tape N.W.O.	Big Squad, Hitmaker	
6	The High & Mighty	Sound of Market	Eastern Conference	
6	UntilJapan	Trompe L'oeil	Silence In The Ballroom	
13	AJ Tracey	Don't Die Before You're Dead	Revenge Records	Debuted at No. 37 on the UK Albums Chart
13	EST Gee	My World	CMG, Interscope	Debuted at No. 155 on the Billboard 200
13	FearDorian	Out The Past With A Window	Self-released	
13	Iann Dior	Cycles	Big Noise	
13	Juicy J & Logic	Live and In Color	Trippy Music, Stem	
13	KayCyy	Before I Was Born	Self-released	
13	K.O	Phara City	Sony Africa, Skhanda Republic	
13	Leikeli47	Lei Keli ft. 47 / For Promotional Use Only	Acrylic, Hardcover, Thirty Tigers	
13	Lil Tecca	Dopamine	Galactic, Republic Records	Debuted at No. 3 on the Billboard 200
13	Louis Rei	Exhale	It's All Connected	
13	Onefour	Look at Me Now	Onefour Records	Debuted at No. 2 on the ARIA Charts
13	Skaiwater	PinkPrint 3	GoodTalk	
13	Slick Rick	Victory	7Wallace, Mass Appeal Records	
13	Smiley	Don't Box Me In	OVO, Santa Anna	
13	Spank Nitti James & Hit-Boy	High-Class Wiggler	Wiggle National, R Baron	
13	StaySolidRocky	After Party	Self-released	
13	Tha God Fahim & Nicholas Craven	Dump Gawd: Hyperbolic Time Chamber Rap 13	Self-released	
13	Token	I'm Not Supposed to Be Here	Never Too Different	
13	Yamê	Ébêm	DBS, Naïve	
15	Daz Dillinger	Retaliation, Revenge and Get Back 2	Self-released	
17	Bas & The Hics	Melanchronica	The Fiends	
17	Ghais Guevara	The Other 2/5ths or: The Absolutely True Diary of a Part-Time Trench Baby	Self-released	
18	Isaiah Hull	Pocomania	Young	
19	Vic Mensa	Sundiata	Self-released	
20	Aitch	4	Infinitum, NQ	Debuted at No. 7 on the UK Albums Chart
20	Dave East & Yung Chris	Fine Dining	FTD, CDR	
20	EsDeeKid	Rebel	XV Records, Lizzy Records	Debuted at No. 97 on the UK Albums Chart; Debuted at No. 131 on the Billboard 200
20	K-Trap	When The Dust Settles	Thousand8	
20	Kwengface	Victim of Circumstance	Warner UK, Zoned Out	
20	Loyle Carner	Hopefully!	EMI Records	Debuted at No. 2 on the UK Albums Chart
20	Lukah & Statik Selektah	A Lost Language Found	Raw Materials	
20	Memphis Bleek	Apt 3D	Self-released	
20	Midwxst	Archangel	Broke	
20	Nick Grant	I Took It Personal	Infinity &	
20	Pluto	Both Ways	Motown	Debuted at No. 190 on the Billboard 200
20	Samara Cyn	Backroads	Vanta	
20	ScarLip	Scarred B4 Fame	Broken Child, Epic	
20	Yhung T.O.	Trust Issues 2	Self-released	
20	YTB Fatt	Da Foxprint	Loaf Boyz, 10K Projects	
27	Baby Money	Less Is More	Third Eye, Empire	
27	Bino Rideaux	Tha Language	Out The Blue, Create Music Group	
27	Bktherula	Lucy	Warner	
27	BLP Kosher	Brackish	Dreidel Gang	
27	DJ Drama	Long Way From Home	MNRK	
27	Felly	Ambroxyde	Everwonder	
27	Gashi & Jimi Banks	The Killah Whales of Gotham	Orca Sound	
27	Jon Connor & KLC	Twenty Four	All Varsity	
27	Kamaiyah & DJ Idea	First Lady Of The Mob	Self-released	
27	Kevin Abstract	Blush	Juno	
27	King Combs	Never Stop	Goodfellas	
27	Lil Double 0	Agent 0	Freebandz	
27	Lil Skies	The Evolution of the Rose	Big Noise	
27	Lizzo	My Face Hurts from Smiling	Nice Life Recording, Atlantic Records	
27	Pi'erre Bourne	Made In Paris	SossHouse, Interscope	
27	Public Enemy	Black Sky Over the Projects: Apartment 2025	Self-released	
27	RJMrLA	Ommio 4	Ommio, Empire	
27	Rmc Mike	Like Mike	Mine, Empire	
27	Russ	W!ld	Diemon	Debuted at No. 10 on the Billboard 200
27	Sada Baby	Grey Tape Smoke	Big Squad, Hitmaker	
27	SSGKobe	No Place Like Home	Ten88	
27	Tech N9ne	5816 Forest	Strange Music	
27	Tobi Lou	Breathing Room <3	Free Agency	

=== July ===
Day	Artist(s)	Album	Record label(s)	Entering chart position
1	Lazer Dim 700	Sins Aloud	Santa Anna	
2	Young Buck	Target Practice	Street Flavor, Cashville	
3	Mello Buckzz	Hollyhood	No More Heroes, Santa Anna	
3	Ramirez	The Playas Manual II	Velvet Note, Empire	
3	Smoke DZA	On My Way to Berlin	RFC	
3	Trae tha Truth	Angel	Self-released	
4	Arrested Development	Adult Contemporary Hip-Hop	Vagabond	
4	JID	GDLU (Preluxe)	Dreamville, Interscope	
4	Kae Tempest	Self Titled	Island	Debuted at No. 25 on the UK Albums Chart
4	Tragedy Khadafi & Recognize Ali	The Past, The Present and The Future	Greenfield	
4	Tyla Yaweh	I Can Be Petty Too	Rager Boy	
7	Duki	5202	Dale Play, SSJ	
9	Tobi	Elements Vol. 2	Allwon	
11	360	Out of the Blue	Teamwrk Records	
11	81355	Bad Dogs	Joyful Noise	
11	Boldy James & Nicholas Craven	Late to My Own Funeral	Self-released	
11	Burna Boy	No Sign of Weakness	Spaceship, Bad Habit, Atlantic	Debuted at No. 200 on the Billboard 200
11	Chinese Man	We've Been Here Before 2	Self-released	
11	Clipse	Let God Sort Em Out	Roc Nation	Debuted at No. 4 on the Billboard 200
11	Deante' Hitchcock	Just a Sample 3	Do Better, 195 Oak	
11	FCG Heem	Mz. Tania Baby	New Era, 100k, Create	
11	Justin Bieber	Swag	ILH, Def Jam	Debuted at No. 2 on the Billboard 200
11	Larry June & Cardo	Until Night Comes	The Freeminded, Empire	Debuted at No. 149 on the Billboard 200
11	Lil Tony	Tkey vs. Tony	Priority	
11	Medhane	Offering	Never Panicking, 16	
11	Mr. Muthafuckin' eXquire	Vol. 2: The Y.O.Uprint	Old Soul	
11	Open Mike Eagle	Neighborhood Gods Unlimited	Auto Reverse	
11	Still Fresh	No Man's Land	Nouvelle Ecole	
11	Yelawolf & J. Michael Phillips	Whiskey & Roses	Slumerican	
12	Bizarre & Foul Mouth	HGG5 Basement Jazz	Street Flavor Records, Redhead Records	
13	JackBoys & Travis Scott	JackBoys 2	Cactus Jack Records, Epic Records	Debuted at No. 1 on the Billboard 200
16	Benny the Butcher	Summertime Butch 2	Black Soprano Family	
18	Ace Hood	S.O.U.L.	Hood Nation	
18	Anycia & DJ Drama	Grady Baby	UnitedMasters	
18	Che	Rest in Bass	Self-released	
18	Gelo	League of My Own	Def Jam	
18	Hard Life	Onion	Island	
18	Jackson Wang	Magic Man 2	88rising	Debuted at No. 13 on the Billboard 200
18	Jim Legxacy	Black British Music (2025)	XL	Debuted at No. 29 on the UK Albums Chart
18	Joyner Lucas	ADHD 2	Twenty Nine, Tully	Debuted at No. 31 on the Billboard 200
18	Kahukx	Syd To Ldn	Aura	
18	Kanii	#Blue	Masked, Warner	
18	Loe Shimmy	Rockstar Junkie	Open Shift	
18	Raekwon	The Emperor's New Clothes	Mass Appeal	
18	$ilkMoney	Who Waters the Wilting Giving Tree Once the Leaves Dry Up and Fruits No Longer Bear?	Lex	
18	Young Deji	When Are You Coming Back to Houston	Taylor Gang	
21	Tyler, the Creator	Don't Tap the Glass	Columbia	Debuted at No. 1 on the Billboard 200
22	Lelo	New Detroit	10K Projects	
23	Penomeco	RNSSNC Tape	Ego, Kakao	
24	Homeboy Sandman & Sonnyjim	Soli Deo Gloria	Dirty Looks, We Buy Gold	
25	Apollo Brown & Bronze Nazareth	A Funeral for a Dream	Escapism	
25	Bay Swag	Damaged Thoughts	Nothing Bout Us Regular, Standard, UnitedMasters	
25	Booter Bee	True Stories 2	Zeromileage	Debuted at No. 50 on the UK Albums Chart
25	Freddie Gibbs & The Alchemist	Alfredo 2	ESPN, ALC Records, Virgin Music Group	Debuted at No. 13 on the Billboard 200
25	Hanumankind	Monsoon Season	Capitol, Universal, SLDM	
25	Paul Wall & DJ.Fresh	The Tonite Show	Perfect Time	
25	Peysoh	FinallyFed	Empire	
25	Quadeca	Vanisher, Horizon Scraper	X8 Music	
25	Sada Baby	The Green Tape DX	Big Squad, Hitmaker	
25	Snoop Dogg & DJ Green Lantern	Live from the Mothership II: Emergency Landing	Self-released	
25	Tommy Genesis	Genesis	Ultra	
25	YoungBoy Never Broke Again	MASA	Never Broke Again, Motown	Debuted at No. 6 on the Billboard 200
30	Curren$y	7/30	Jet Life	
30	Father	Patricide	Father's Darlings	
30	Ski Mask the Slump God	The Lost Files	Very Rare & Co, Empire	
31	Demahjiae	What Do You Hear When You Pray?	Empire	
31	Wolfacejoeyy	Summer Songs	Self-released	

=== August ===
Day	Artist(s)	Album	Record label(s)	Entering chart position
1	24hrs & MadeinTYO	24hrs in Tokyo 2	Private Club	
1	AraabMuzik	Electronic Dream 2	Genre Defying, D Productions	
1	BabyTron	Luka Troncic 2	The Hip Hop Lab, Empire	
1	Boosie Badazz	Words Of A Real One	Badazz Syndicate	
1	Chuuwee & Trizz	Quarter: AMB4	Making Lots-A-$$$$	
1	Desiigner	II	LOD Entertainment	
1	Domo Genesis & Graymatter	World Gone Mad	Things Happen	
1	Hilltop Hoods	Fall from the Light	Island Australia, Universal Australia	Debuted at No. 1 on the ARIA Charts
1	HXG	Homixide Lifestyle 2	Opium, Interscope	
1	Juicy J	Head On Swivel	Trippy Music	
1	Lil Poppa	Almost Normal Again	CMG, Interscope Records	
1	Mal Devisa	Palimpsesa	Topshelf Records	
1	Metro Boomin & DJ Spinz	A Futuristic Summa	Boominati	Debuted at No. 23 on the Billboard 200
1	Montana 700	Greatest of All Traps	Remain Solid, 300	
1	OT The Real & 38 Spesh	Possession With Intent	TCF	
1	Rexx Life Raj	In Rhythm	Empire	
1	Rucci	Don't Kross Tha Bone	Mackk & Company, Empire	
1	Saweetie	Hella Pressure	Warner	
1	Suicideboys	Thy Kingdom Come	G59	Debuted at No. 4 on the Billboard 200
1	Xaviersobased	Once More	1-chance, Atlantic	
1	Yeat	Dangerous Summer	Field Trip Recordings, Capitol Records	Debuted at No. 9 on the Billboard 200
1	Young Chop	King Chop 3	Chop Squad	
8	Big Freedia	Pressing Onward	Queen Diva	
8	Bryson Tiller	The Vices	RCA	
8	DJ Premier & Roc Marciano	The Coldest Profession	TTT (To The Top)	
8	Dro Kenji	Pt.2	10K Projects	
8	Gunna	The Last Wun	YSL	Debuted at No. 3 on the Billboard 200
8	JID	God Does Like Ugly	Dreamville	Debuted at No. 11 on the Billboard 200
8	Kaash Paige	KaashMyChecks	Rostrum	
8	Mozzy	Intrusive Thoughts 2	Empire	
8	Remble	Juco	Warner	
8	Young Nudy	Paradise	RCA	
10	Rio da Yung OG	F.L.I.N.T. (Feeling Like I'm Not Through)	Mine, Empire	
10	Tragedy Khadafi & DJ Supa Dave	Fund-The-Mental	Thuphora	
11	Skillz	Words for Days Vol. 1	Big Kidz	
12	Insane Clown Posse	The Naught	Psychopathic Records	
12	YoungBoy Never Broke Again & DJ Khaled	Deshawn	Never Broke Again, Motown Records	Debuted at No. 135 on the Billboard 200
13	Kevin Gates	Luca Brasi 4	Bread Winner Alumni, Artist Partner Group	Debuted at No. 44 on the Billboard 200
15	Asco	Perfect Timing	Mulli Music Group	Debuted at No. 51 on the UK Albums Chart
15	Babyface Ray	Codeine Cowboy	Wavy Gang, Empire	
15	Chance the Rapper	Star Line	Self-released	Debuted at No. 22 on the Billboard 200
15	Evidence	Unlearning Vol. 2	Rhymesayers	
15	Joey Valence & Brae	Hyperyouth	RCA	
15	Juicy J & Endea Owens	Caught Up In This Illusion	Trippy, Stem	
15	K Camp	Kiss 6	Rare Sound	
15	Kal Banx	Rhoda	Top Dawg Entertainment	
15	Kaytranada	Ain't No Damn Way!	RCA	
15	Loski	Be Right Back	Aplco	
15	Murs	Love and Rockets 3:16 (The Emancipation)	Mello Music Group	
15	Preservation & Gabe 'Nandez	Sortilège	Backwoodz Studioz	
15	Protect	500 Days of Summer	Ball Hog, Atlantic	
15	Rich Brian	Where is My Head?	88rising	
15	That Mexican OT	Recess	Good Life, Capitol Records	
15	Various artists	Highest 2 Lowest (Original Soundtrack)	A24 Music	
15	Zillionaire Doe	Mr. 14 Months	CMG, Interscope	
15	Zoe Osama	Mr. Nobody	Tha New Cartel, Empire	
22	2 Chainz	Red Clay (Official Motion Picture Soundtrack)	Game Bread, Empire Distribution	
22	BigXthaPlug	I Hope You're Happy	UnitedMasters	Debuted at No. 7 on the Billboard 200
22	Danny Towers	Sinners Club	TC Music, Empire	
22	Earl Sweatshirt	Live Laugh Love	Warner Records	Debuted at No. 184 on the Billboard 200
22	Ghostface Killah	Supreme Clientele 2	Mass Appeal	
22	J.P.	Took A Turn	Roc Nation	
22	Kalan.FrFr	California Player	Roc Nation	
22	Kid Cudi	Free	Wicked Awesome, Republic	Debuted at No. 192 on the Billboard 200
22	Lecrae	Reconstruction	Reach	
22	Offset	Kiari	Motown	Debuted at No. 16 on the Billboard 200
22	Soulja Boy	Draco Season	SODMG	
22	Us3	Soundtrack	Self-released	
26	D Smoke	Wake Up Supa	WoodWorks, Death Row	
26	Eminem	Stans (The Official Soundtrack)	Shady Records, Aftermath Entertainment, Interscope Records	
28	Westside Gunn	Heels Have Eyes 2	Griselda Records	
29	Che Noir & The Other Guys	No Validation	Hipnott	
29	Duke Deuce	Rebirth	Made Men Movement, Hitmaker	
29	Joey Bada$$	Lonely at the Top	Columbia Records	
29	Miles Minnick	Via Dolorosa	Glo, Empire	
29	OMB Peezy	Diary of a Crashout	Overkill, Hitmaker	
29	Rakim	The Re-Up	Holy Toledo, Compound Interests, Big Ghost	
29	Tobi Lou	Dirty Synthesizer <3	Free Agency	
29	Yvngxchris	I Havent Been The Same Since 2019	Self-released	
30	Currensy	8/30	Jet Life	

=== September ===
Day	Artist(s)	Album	Record label(s)	Entering chart position
4	El Snappo	Not Fa Da Industry	300	
5	310babii	Webkam	High IQ, Empire	
5	Erica Banks	Ain't Shit Stopped	1501, Create	
5	Jabari	Ultra	Epic	
5	Justin Bieber	Swag II	ILH, Def Jam	
5	Kashdami	Paper Trail	Infiniti	
5	Mazza_L20	Different Times	EMI	Debuted at No. 42 on the UK Albums Chart
5	Roc C & Ariano	Homegrown	Urbnet, Fontana North	
5	Saigon & Buckwild	Paint the World Black	Point Blank	
5	SL	Block Tales	Believe UK	
5	Statik Selektah, Wais P & The Musalini	Choose or Lose	Perfect Time	
9	Ho99o9	Tomorrow We Escape	Deathkult, Last Gang, MNRK	
10	Raq Baby	I Never Gave AF	Santa Anna	
11	Daz Dillinger	Retaliation, Revenge and Get Back 3	Self-released	
12	4Batz	Still Shinin	BuVision	
12	A!MS	Peak Season	3fifty7	
12	Connie Diiamond	Underdog Szn 2	Def Jam	
12	Fredo Bang	Kreature Muzik	Bang Biz, Empire	
12	Ice Cube	Man Up	Lench Mob, Hitmaker	
12	Jermaine Dupri	Magic City	So So Def, Hybe America	
12	King Iso	Ghetto Psycho	Strange Music	
12	Strandz	Diaspora Dance Music	Self-released	
12	Tony Shhnow & Mike & Keys	Self Portrait	Create	
12	Twenty One Pilots	Breach	Fueled by Ramen	Debuted at No. 1 on the Billboard 200
13	Viper	I'm Evil As Fuck, Nigga / Tha FBI Can't Decipher My Mufuckin' Rhymes	9518514	
15	Currensy	9/15	Jet Life	
16	Locksmith & The Heatmakerz	Wine & Circus	Landmark	
17	Chris Webby	88 Milligrams	EightyHD	
17	Willie the Kid & Soop	A Fly in the Soup	The Fly	
19	Atmosphere	Jestures	Rhymesayers	
19	Cardi B	Am I the Drama?	Atlantic	Debuted at No. 1 on the Billboard 200
19	Deniro Farrar & Marc Spano	Stellar Reputation	Old Soul Music	
19	Derek Minor & Canon	Vigilante	Reflection, Vigilante	
19	Destroy Lonely	Broken Hearts 3	Opium, Interscope Records	Debuted at No. 64 on the Billboard 200
19	Hunxho	For Her 2	300	Debuted at No. 61 on the Billboard 200
19	Jay Electronica	A Written Testimony: Leaflets	Roc Nation	
19	Joell Ortiz	Love, Peace & Trauma	Hitmaker	
19	Kojey Radical	Don't Look Down	Warner, Asylum	Debuted at No. 59 on the UK Albums Chart
19	Lazer Dim 700	Gangway	Santa Anna	
19	Lefty Gunplay	Ghetto Heisman	OTR	
19	Lil Scoom89	Forever Scoomin	Signal, Columbia	
19	Mick Jenkins & Emil	A Murder of Crows	Self-released	
19	NorthSideBenji	Misery Loves Company	Nrthrn	
19	Payroll Giovanni	If Not Me Then Who	Bylug, Empire	
19	Savage Ga$p	Nightcrawler	October Forever, RBC, BMG	
19	Sho Baraka	Midnight of a Good Culture	Lions and Liars	
19	Various artists	Him (Original Motion Picture Soundtrack)	Universal, Loma Vista	
19	Vic Spencer	Trees Are Undefeated	Old Fart Luggage	
21	Killah Priest	Abraxas 2	Proverbs	
23	Carrtoons	Space Cadet	+1	
24	Cardo Got Wings	Sigan Viendo	MadHouse, Empire	
24	Saucy Santana	Haute Sauce	SteamCut	
24	Zelooperz	Dali Aint Dead	Self-released	
26	Bankrol Hayden	Middle Of Somewhere	Self-released	
26	Bliss n Eso	The Moon (Dark Side)	Flight Deck, Mushroom Records	Debuted at No. 3 on the ARIA Charts
26	Connor Price	About Time	4 of clubs	
26	Demrick	Ooowee	Ineffable	
26	Doja Cat	Vie	Kemosabe, RCA	Debuted at No. 4 on the Billboard 200
26	Human Error Club & Kenny Segal	Human Error Club at Kenny's House	Backwoodz Studioz	
26	Jay Worthy	Once Upon A Time	GDF, Empire	
26	Jehry Robinson	Hella Highwater	Strange Music, FBA Management, Virgin Music Group	
26	Lil Mosey	Fall City	Love U Forever, Cinq	
26	Lord Apex	Smoke Sessions 4	Self-released	
26	Peezy	Still Ghetto	#Boyz, Empire	
26	Sol Chyld	Rebirth.Theory	Urth2Saturn, MNRK	
26	Spyro	The Men, The Boys & Your Guy	Tap, Cinq	
26	YFN Lucci	Already Legend.	Think It's A Game	Debuted at No. 14 on the Billboard 200
26	Young Thug	UY Scuti	YSL, 300	Debuted at No. 6 on the Billboard 200
28	Jeezy & DJ Drama	Still Snowin'	JWJ	
30	Femdot	King Dilla 2	Delacreme	
30	Jev.	Lonerwrld, Vol. 2	Payday	
30	J.I the Prince of N.Y	Septembers Finest	G*Starr	
30	Yhung T.O.	Yhung & Rich	Self-released	

=== October ===
Day	Artist(s)	Album	Record label(s)	Entering chart position
1	Jace!	A New Fantasy	Simple Stupid, UMG	
1	Klein	Sleep with a Cane	Roc Nation	
1	Luhh Dyl	Hear My Cry	300	
2	Bryson Tiller	Solace	RCA	Debuted at No. 52 on the Billboard 200
3	03 Greedo	Another Night Out	Alamo	
3	Alfa Mist	Roulette	Sekito	
3	Autumn!	Rolling Stone	Self-released	
3	Bandmanrill	Fine$$e Father	Self-released	
3	Dame D.O.L.L.A	Y.A.G.I	Front Page	
3	Dizzy Wright & Kxvi	Soul Searching	Ineffable	
3	Don Trip	Forgiveness Is God's Job... Part 1	MRVL	
3	Jackzebra	Hunched Jack Mixtape	Surf Gang	
3	Lil Tjay	Focus On The Music	Self-released	
3	Myka 9, Blu & Mono En Stereo	God Takes Care of Babies & Fools	Nature Sounds	
3	Niko B	Cheerleader	Ditto	
3	RXKNephew, MVW & ChaseTheMoney	Whole Lotta RXK	GetYouKilledRecords	
3	Stevie Stone	No Blueprints	Ahdasee Records	
3	Thirteendegrees°	Black Fridayz	Island	
3	Thouxanbanfauni	Arsonist	Create	
3	X-Raided	A Prophecy in Purgatory	Strange Music, Bloc Star Evolution, Virgin Music Group	
5	Odumodublvck	Industry Machine	Kalacious, Native, Def Jam	
8	BAK Jay	Letters I Never Sent	10K Projects	
8	Doe Boy	Last Hope	RBMG	
10	Baker Boy	Djandjay	Island	Debuted at No. 13 on the ARIA Charts
10	Bia	Bianca	Epic	
10	DDG	Moo	Epic	
10	JasonMartin & Mike & Keys	A Hit Dog Gon Holla	50 Million, Futuristic	
10	Jay Worthy	Once Upon A Time 2	GDF, Empire	
10	Jnhygs	Her Jams	25/7	
10	Kent Jamz	Fear	Epic	
10	Makaya McCraven	Off The Record	International Anthem, Nonesuch	
10	Mobb Deep	Infinite	Mass Appeal	Debuted at No. 90 on the Billboard 200
10	OsamaSon	Psykotic	Motion, Atlantic	Debuted at No. 81 on the Billboard 200
10	Pluto	Pluto World	Motown	
10	Princess Nokia	Girls	Artist House	
10	Rich Amiri	Grit & Grace	Internet Money, 10K Projects	
10	The 046	Legacy In Motion	ONErpm	
10	The Cool Kids	Hi Top Fade	Fool's Gold, Reservoir	
10	TiaCorine	Corinian	South Coast, Interscope	
14	Wynne	Say Wynne	Self-released	
15	Curren$y	10/15	Jet Life	
15	Dave East	Karma 4	FTD	
17	Ashnikko	Smoochies	Parlophone	Debuted at No. 158 on the Billboard 200
17	Bbno$	Bbno$	Broke	Debuted at No. 140 on the Billboard 200
17	Gucci Mane	Episodes	1017, Atlantic	Debuted at No. 195 on the Billboard 200
17	HeadHuncho Amir	50 Year Run	Only Sun, 300	
17	Hurricane Wisdom	Perfect Storm: Sorry 4 The Rain	Rebel, Gamma	Debuted at No. 54 on the Billboard 200
17	Kocky Ka	Street Therapy	Define The Era, Quality Control	
17	Monaleo	Who Did the Body	Stomp Down, Columbia	
17	Money Man	30 Days	Black Circle, Empire	
17	PartyOf2	Amerika's Next Top Party!	Def Jam	
17	Ty Dolla Sign	Tycoon	EZMNY, Atlantic	
22	Anik Khan	Onēk	The Foreign Affair, Thirty Tigers	
22	Bruiser Wolf & Harry Fraud	Made By Dope	Fake Shore Drive, Bruiser House, SRFSCHL	
23	Bri3	18	B3D, Atlantic	
23	Conductor Williams	Conductor We Have a Problem, Pt. 2	Station	
24	Bnyx	Loading...	Data Club, Lyfestyle Corporation, Field Trip Recordings, Capitol	
24	Culture Jam	Legend in My Hood	CJFM	
24	Cupcakke	The Bakkery	Self-released	
24	Dave	The Boy Who Played the Harp	Capitol	Debuted at No. 1 on the UK Albums Chart
24	Dinos	AAA	SPKTAQLR	
24	DJ Scratch & Planet Asia	Kings Dominion	Albany Park Records	
24	Hit-Boy & The Alchemist	Goldfish	Surf Club, ALC Records, Empire	
24	Ian	2005	BuVision, Columbia	
24	Kankan	#F.E.B	Empire	
24	Kxllswxtch	Eyesore	Empire	
24	Mike Shabb	Fight the Power!	Blk	
24	Monie Love	Love Notes	iKonic	
24	Monte Booker	Noise (Meaning)	EQT	
24	Niko Is & J. Rawls	The Optimist's Son	Javotti	
24	Planet Giza	The Sky Is Recording Me: 100 Years Later, Vol. 3	Quiet Note	
24	R.A.P. Ferreira & Kenny Segal	The Night Green Side of It	Ruby Yacht, Alpha Pup	
24	Reuben Vincent & 9th Wonder	Welcome Home	Jamla Records, Roc Nation Distribution	
24	Rilès	The 25th Hour	Self-released	
24	Rim'K	RUN Evolution	MB	
24	Russ Millions	Personal	APLCO	
24	Sheek Louch	Gorillaween V.7	D Block	
24	Slim Thug & Lil' Keke	Double Cup, Pt. 2: Da Re-Up	Hogg Life, Slfmade 713	
25	Aesop Rock	I Heard It's a Mess There Too	Self-released	
25	DocturDot	Howl at the Moon	Free Graffiti	
25	Master P	No Limit 5K Mix: Lost Tapes	No Limit	
27	Berner	09	Bern One	
27	Jace & DJ Drama	Gangsta Grillz: Eastside Jace	Ebony Son	
28	DeeBaby	Until This Is Over.	Allready Platinum, Create	
30	Big Moochie Grape	Nightmare on AB	Paper Route Empire	
30	Naza	Masta Degat	Capricarolesque Industry, AllPoints	
30	Saba	C0ffee!	Pivot	
30	Icewear Vezzo	Purple Passion	Iced Up	
31	Armani White	There's a Ghost in My House	Legendbound, Def Jam	
31	Big Boogie	Pain on Paper 4	CMG	
31	Big L	Harlem's Finest: Return of the King	Mass Appeal	
31	Big Opp	Big Opportunity	Drenched Gang, Geffen	
31	CEO Trayle	Happy Halloween 7	The Freeminded, Empire	
31	Chuckyy	Bloodbathh Vol. 2: Violate We Demonstrate	Santa Anna	
31	Cities Aviv	The Revolving Star: Archive & Practice 002	Black Iron Gate	
31	Hariroc & Lil Tony	Discernment	Squid1luh	
31	Johan Lenox	Full Speed Nowhere	Self-released	
31	Josman	Dom Perignon Crying	Sideline, Sony France	
31	JT Money	Day Party	Undeniable	
31	KayCyy	Mixtape V1	Self-released	
31	Knucks	A Fine African Man	No Days Off	Debuted at No. 42 on the UK Albums Chart
31	Kodak Black	Just Getting Started	Vulture Love, Capitol	Debuted at No. 77 on the Billboard 200
31	Lil Bushwick	Lil Bushwick	Vomit Face	
31	Lil Gotit & Lil Keed	Fraternal	ONErpm	
31	Lloyd Banks	HHVI: The Six of Swords	Money By Any Means	
31	Masta Ace & Tom Caruana	Natural Forces	Tea Sea	
31	Offset	Haunted by Fame	Motown	
31	Ransom & DJ Premier	The Reinvention	To The Top	
31	Sauce Walka	Splatt Mafia	Empire	
31	Shad	Start Anew	Secret City	
31	Shlohmo	Repulsor	R&R	
31	SosMula	Kamp Krystl Lake	Atlantic, Limosa Nostra	
31	South Strip	Do or Die	AB6, Empire	
31	Westside Gunn	Heels Have Eyes 3	Griselda	
31	YoDogg & Cardo	Raised by Wolves 2	Epic	

=== November ===
Day	Artist(s)	Album	Record label(s)	Entering chart position
2	Baby Smoove	Help	Forever Franchise	
5	BunnaB	Sweet Lick	Ice Cream Girl, Artist Partner Group	
5	Slayr	Half Blood	Self-released	
6	Joey Purp	Alaska	LemonTree, Fake Shore Drive	
6	Lausse the Cat	The Mocking Stars	Velvet Blues	
7	1up Tee	How To Move	GoodTalk	
7	1900Rugrat	Big Ah Kidz	Remain Solid, 300	
7	Aarne & Toxi$	Slaang	Self-released	
7	Armand Hammer & The Alchemist	Mercy	Backwoodz Studioz	
7	Blk Odyssey	Mood Control	Earthchild, Empire	
7	Bun B & Cory Mo	Way Mo Trill	C Mozart Muzik, II Trill, Hitmaker	
7	Casey Veggies	Caught Up In The Game: Disc 2	Self-released	
7	Danny Brown	Stardust	Warp	
7	DJ Snake	Nomad	Interscope	
7	Domo Genesis & Graymatter	Scram!	Things Happen Records	
7	G Herbo	Lil Herb	Machine, Republic	Debuted at No. 15 on the Billboard 200
7	JasonMartin & Mike & Keys	Mafia Cafe	50 Million, Futuristic	
7	Jim Jones	The Fall Before the Rise	VL, Hitmaker	
7	Lefty Gunplay	I Told You So	OTR, YouSeeLA	
7	Leto	Thug Ceremony	Winterfell, Allpoints	
7	MexikoDro	Still Goin the EP	Republic	
7	Mickey Factz & Awsme J	One Above All	Museum Mick	
7	Orelsan	La Fuite en avant	7th Magnitude, Strong Ninja, Sony France	
7	Real Bad Man & Boldy James	Adu 2	Self-released	
7	Reason	Everything In My Soul_Blue	Do More, 195 Oak	
7	Shungu	Faith in the Unknown	Lex	
7	Smiley	Never Box Me In	OVO, Santa Anna	
7	Termanology & Nef	Shut Up and Write	ST	
7	Thatboykwame	In A Matter of Time	Self-released	
7	UnoTheActivist	Troy	Silent Hills, Omega	
7	VisionPlay	The VZN SZN Disc 1	MNRK	
7	Yeonjun	No Labels: Part 01	Big Hit	Debuted at No. 10 on the Billboard 200
7	Young Miko	Do Not Disturb	The Wave	
11	Navy Blue	The Sword & the Soaring	Freedom Sounds	
14	24kGoldn	Icarus II	Columbia	
14	2Slimey	High Anxiety	Listen to the Kids	
14	Apollo Brown & Ty Farris	Run Toward The Monster	Escapism	
14	Aries	Glass Jaw	Wunderworld	
14	Bay Swag	Swiggity	Standard, Nothing Bout Us Regular, UnitedMasters	
14	Boldy James & Nicholas Craven	Criminally Attached	Roc Nation	
14	Boosie Badazz & YoungBoy Never Broke Again	225 Business	Badazz Syndicate	
14	B.U.G Antman	Y'all 2 Ugly	Marki, Warner	
14	Chika	Wish You Were (T)here	ONErpm	
14	Che Noir & 7xvethegenius	Desired Crowns	Poetic Movement, Broadband Sound	
14	Cory Gunz	Loosie Pack 4	Militia	
14	D-Block Europe	PTSD 2	Self-released	Debuted at No. 4 on the UK Albums Chart
14	FearDorian & Osquinn	Before You Press Play	3500	
14	Flau'jae	One of a Kind	Flage	
14	Jorjiana	Project 219	Self-released	
14	Lazer Dim 700	The Formula	Self-released	
14	Lil Gnar	In My Glory	43B	
14	Lithe	Euphoria	GSL	
14	Lola Brooke	Iight bet!	Arista	
14	Meek Mill	Indie Pack (Vol. 1)	DreamChasers, Stem	
14	Mg Lil Bubba & King Hendrick$	Bub & Hundo	Create	
14	NF	Fear	Self-released	Debuted at No. 4 on the Billboard 200
14	No Savage	For the Streets	300	
14	Oh No	Nodega	Disruption Productions, Nature Sounds	
14	Siete7x	Misunderstood	Empire	
14	Tee Grizzley	Street Psalms	300	
14	Tobi & Real Bad Man	The Perfect Blue	Real Bad Man Records	
14	Valee & MVW	Where Were We	Riveting	
14	Wale	Everything Is a Lot	Def Jam	Debuted at No. 19 on the Billboard 200
14	Yung Bans & Highway	Mudd Bruddas	Newilluminessence, 10F1, Good Morning	
20	Ransom & Conductor Williams	The Uncomfortable Truth	Momentum, Station	
20	Philthy Rich	Heart of the Hood	FOD Ent	
21	1300Saint	Savior	Young Stoner Life	
21	Awich	Okinawan Wuman	And Music	
21	Blanco	Paradise on a Lifeboat	Believe	
21	De La Soul	Cabin in the Sky	Mass Appeal	
21	Emmeline	Liftgoingup	Lewis Recordings	
21	Nemzzz	From Me 2 U	Self-released	
21	Shordie Shordie	Love Lost	Trippers, Empire	
21	SoFaygo	Mania	Cactus Jack	
21	Sonnyjim & Morriarchi	Golden Parachute	Self-released	
21	Stray Kids	Do It	JYP, Republic	Debuted at No. 1 on the Billboard 200
21	Tommy Richman	Worlds Apart*	ISO Supremacy, Pulse, Concord	
23	Daz Dillinger	Rowtation	Self-released	
25	Fendi P & DJ.Fresh	World's Freshest P	Jet Life	
25	Mavi	The Pilot	Loma Vista	
25	MNRK	The Snowball Effect	MNRK	
26	Lazer Dim 700	Stikkz N Stonez	Self-released	
26	Your Old Droog	Anything Is Possible	Self-released	
27	Hit-Boy & Spank Nitti James	Yeast Talkin'	Surf Club	
28	9th Wonder	Zion XI	Jamla	
28	ASAP Ferg	Flip Phone Shorty - Strictly For Da Streetz Vol. 1	Trillagan Island	
28	BlocBoy JB	T.B.C	Self-released	
28	Papoose	Bars on Wheels: A Journey To Save Hip Hop	Wynn	
29	Yuno Miles	Album	Hallwood	

=== December ===
Day	Artist(s)	Album	Record label(s)	Entering chart position
1	Brother Ali	Brother Minutester 2: Üsküdar Sessions	Mello	
2	Deniro Farrar & Child Actor	Raw Materials	Old Soul	
3	Lil Baby	The Leaks	Quality Control, Motown	Debuted at No. 150 on the Billboard 200
4	Ghais Guevara	A Quest to Self-Mythologize	Self-released	
4	Munna Ikee	Hope In My Hood Vol. 1	Drenched Gang, Geffen	
4	Redveil	Sankofa	Fashionably Early	
5	1504 MuteBaby	All Said And Done	Epic, Slaughter Gang	
5	9lives	Unity	Pulse	
5	Bankroll Ni	Who Is Bankroll?	Columbia	
5	Big K.R.I.T.	Dedicated To Cadalee Biarritz Vol. 1	ONErpm	
5	Declaime & Der Brxwnsxn	Flatulent	Urbnet	
5	Erick Sermon	Dynamic Duos	Def Squad, DNA, Hitmaker	
5	Homeboy Sandman	Turns Out I Can Sell a Few More of These	Dirty Looks	
5	Infinite Coles	SweetFace Killah	Don't Sleep, PIAS	
5	Lil Crix	Kill For Crix	Vulture Love, Capitol	
5	Mike Shabb	Melted Faces, Vol. 1	Blk	
5	Money Man	Predator	Black Circle, Empire	
5	PlaqueBoyMax	Too Much Music	5$tar, UMG	
5	Pressa	Press Machine II	Blue Feathers	
5	Skyzoo	Views Of A Lifetime	FGR, Hipnott Records	
5	The Game & Mike & Keys	Every Movie Needs A Trailer	STB	
5	TM88	F.I.L.A. 25 (Forever I Love Atlanta)	Crash Dummy, Empire	
10	Blu, MED & Bane Capital	Good Men Die Like Dogs	Self-released	
11	Bun B & Statik Selektah	TrillStatik 5	Showoff	
12	21 Savage	What Happened to the Streets?	Slaughter Gang, Epic Records	Debuted at No. 3 on the Billboard 200
12	BEO Lil Kenny	BEO Status 3	Quality Control	
12	Bfb Da Packman & Rio da Yung OG	Olympic Shit Talking	Lunch Crew Company, Mine, Synrgy	
12	Bones	DeathBecomesHim	TeamSesh, Empire	
12	Chris Patrick	Pray 4 Me	Def Jam	
12	Conway the Machine	You Can't Kill God with Bullets	Drumwork	
12	FattMack	McKenzie	Great Day, Santa Anna	
12	Fridayy	Everybody Got Somebody	Lost In Melody, Def Jam	
12	Lil' Flip	Fear of Going Broke	Clover G, GT Digital	
12	Lil Noonie	51 Days & 54 Nights Walkin'	Born With Motion, Create	
12	Moka Only	Martian Xmas 2025	Urbnet	
12	Nas & DJ Premier	Light-Years	Mass Appeal	Debuted at No. 47 on the Billboard 200
12	Shy Glizzy	I Was Actually Being Humble	Glizzy Gang	
12	Snow Tha Product	Before I Crashout	Self-released	
12	Wee2Hard	Flight Risk	Quality Control	
17	Lazer Dim 700	Fwaygo	Self-released	
18	Nickelus F	Disclosure Vol. 1	Trick Dice	
19	AJ Snow & Sledgren	Smellin' like Success	Made By OGs, Glitchrealm	
19	Dave East	Eastmix Vol. 1	FTD	
19	Dc2Trill	Parental Advisory	Ten88	
19	JasonMartin & DJ Holiday	OT: Outta Town	50 Million	
19	Lil Zay Osama	YN Tape	Dragonfly, UnitedMasters	
19	Your Old Droog	Yod Serling	Self-released	
19	Z-Ro	Unappreciated	One Deep, SoSouth	
22	Max B	Public Domain 7: The Purge	EMG, Defiant, Slang	
24	Chance the Rapper & Jeremih	Secret Santa	Self-released	
24	JasonMartin	A Lonely Winter	50 Million	
25	Chip Tha Ripper	Rapping Paper (Gift Raps 2)	Evergreen	
25	Peso Pluma & Tito Double P	Dinastía	Double P	Debuted at No. 6 on the Billboard 200
25	Suicideboys	Thy Will Be Done	G59	Debuted at No. 21 on the Billboard 200
26	Don Trip	Forgiveness is God's Job... Part 2	MRVL, Connect	
26	Fetty P Franklin & DaBaby	Kirk Franklin	Groundhawg Entertainment	
26	Kevin Gates	Real Nigga Holiday	Bread Winner Alumni	

== Highest-charting songs ==
=== United States ===
Hip hop songs from any year which charted in the 2025 Top 40 of the Billboard Hot 100
Song	Artist	Project	Peak position
"4x4"	Travis Scott	—N/a	1
"Luther"	Kendrick Lamar and SZA	GNX	1
"Nokia"	Drake	Some Sexy Songs 4 U	2
"What Did I Miss?"	Drake	Iceman	2
"Evil J0rdan"	Playboi Carti	Music	2
"Rather Lie"	Playboi Carti and The Weeknd	Music	4
"All the Way"	BigXthaPlug featuring Bailey Zimmerman	I Hope You're Happy	4
"Gimme a Hug"	Drake	Some Sexy Songs 4 U	6
"Anxiety"	Doechii	Alligator Bites Never Heal	9
"30 for 30"	SZA and Kendrick Lamar	Lana	10
"Outside"	Cardi B	Am I the Drama?	10
"Dum, Dumb, and Dumber"	Lil Baby, Young Thug and Future	WHAM	16
"Fat Juicy & Wet"	Sexyy Red and Bruno Mars	—N/a	17
"Good Credit"	Playboi Carti and Kendrick Lamar	Music	17
"Crush"	Playboi Carti and Travis Scott	Music	20
"Denial Is a River"	Doechii	Alligator Bites Never Heal	21
"Which One"	Drake and Central Cee	Maid of Honour	23
"Backd00r"	Playboi Carti featuring Kendrick Lamar and Jhené Aiko	Music	25
"Safe"	Cardi B featuring Kehlani	Am I the Drama?	26
"Mojo Jojo"	Playboi Carti	Music	27
"Philly"	Playboi Carti and Travis Scott	Music	28
"Dark Thoughts"	Lil Tecca	Dopamine	28
"Jealous Type"	Doja Cat	Vie	28
"Tweaker"	Gelo	League of My Own	29
"Big Poe"	Tyler, the Creator featuring Pharrell Williams	Don't Tap the Glass	33
"Fine Shit"	Playboi Carti	Music	33
"Toxic"	Playboi Carti and Skepta	Music	34
"Fear"	NF	Fear	35
"Hip-Hop"	Lil Wayne and BigXthaPlug featuring Jay Jones	Tha Carter VI	36
"Magnet"	Cardi B	Am I the Drama?	37
"Lover Girl"	Megan Thee Stallion	TBA	38
"K Pop"	Playboi Carti	Music	38
"Money on Money"	Young Thug featuring Future	UY Scuti	39
"Small Town Fame"	Drake	Some Sexy Songs 4 U	40
"Killin' It Girl"	J-Hope featuring GloRilla	TBA	40

=== United Kingdom ===
Hip hop songs from any year which charted in the 2025 Top 10 of the UK Singles Chart
Song	Artist	Project	Peak position
"Victory Lap"	Fred Again, Skepta and PlaqueBoyMax	USB	4
"GBP"	Central Cee and 21 Savage	Can't Rush Greatness	6
"CRG"	Central Cee and Dave	Can't Rush Greatness	6
"History"	Dave featuring James Blake	The Boy Who Played the Harp	9
"Century"	EsDeeKid	TBA	10

== Highest first-week consumption ==
List of albums with the highest first-week consumption (sales + streaming + track equivalent), as of December 2025 in the United States
Number	Album	Artist	1st-week consumption	1st-week position	Refs
1	Music	Playboi Carti	298,000	1	
2	Some Sexy Songs 4 U	PartyNextDoor & Drake	246,000	1	
3	JackBoys 2	JackBoys & Travis Scott	232,000	1	
4	Am I the Drama?	Cardi B	200,000	1	
5	Don't Tap the Glass	Tyler, the Creator	197,000	1	
6	WHAM	Lil Baby	140,000	1	
7	Let God Sort Em Out	Clipse	118,000	4	
8	Tha Carter VI	Lil Wayne	108,000	2	
9	Balloonerism	Mac Miller	81,000	3	
10	The Last Wun	Gunna	80,000	3	

== All critically reviewed albums ranked ==
=== Metacritic ===
Number	Artist	Album	Average score	Number of reviews	Reference
1	Kojey Radical	Don't Look Down	92	4 reviews	
2	Jim Legxacy	Black British Music (2025)	90	6 reviews	
3	Saba & No I.D.	From the Private Collection of Saba and No I.D.	90	4 reviews	
4	Wretch 32	Home?	89	4 reviews	
5	Billy Woods	Golliwog	88	17 reviews	
6	John Glacier	Like a Ribbon	87	8 reviews	
7	Dave	The Boy Who Played the Harp	87	7 reviews	
8	$ilkMoney	Who Waters the Wilting Giving Tree Once the Leaves Dry Up and Fruits No Longer Bear?	87	5 reviews	
9	Little Simz	Lotus	86	14 reviews	
10	Backxwash	Only Dust Remains	86	5 reviews	
11	Kae Tempest	Self Titled	85	8 reviews	
12	Earl Sweatshirt	Live Laugh Love	84	10 reviews	
13	Clipse	Let God Sort Em Out	83	11 reviews	
14	Loyle Carner	Hopefully!	83	9 reviews	
15	Ho99o9	Tomorrow We Escape	83	6 reviews	
16	McKinley Dixon	Magic, Alive!	83	5 reviews	
17	Clipping	Dead Channel Sky	82	10 reviews	
18	Freddie Gibbs & The Alchemist	Alfredo 2	82	7 reviews	
19	Open Mike Eagle	Neighborhood Gods Unlimited	82	4 reviews	
20	De La Soul	Cabin in the Sky	81	11 reviews	
21	Mike	Showbiz!	81	7 reviews	
22	Pink Siifu	Black'!Antique	81	4 reviews	
23	Aesop Rock	Black Hole Superette	79	8 reviews	
24	Armand Hammer & The Alchemist	Mercy	79	9 reviews	
25	2hollis	Star	79	5 reviews	
26	Doja Cat	Vie	78	12 reviews	
27	Quinton Barnes	Black Noise	78	4 reviews	
28	Tyler, the Creator	Don't Tap the Glass	77	11 reviews	
29	Mac Miller	Balloonerism	77	10 reviews	
30	Danny Brown	Stardust	75	18 reviews	
31	Chance the Rapper	Star Line	75	5 reviews	
32	Cardi B	Am I the Drama?	74	13 reviews	
33	Playboi Carti	Music	73	10 reviews	
34	JID	God Does Like Ugly	73	7 reviews	
35	Central Cee	Can't Rush Greatness	72	10 reviews	
36	Mobb Deep	Infinite	72	5 reviews	
37	Rico Nasty	Lethal	71	6 reviews	
38	Ken Carson	More Chaos	71	5 reviews	
39	Nas & DJ Premier	Light-Years	71	4 reviews	
40	Ghostface Killah	Supreme Clientele 2	69	5 reviews	
41	Raekwon	The Emperor's New Clothes	63	4 reviews	
42	DJ Premier & Roc Marciano	The Coldest Profession	59	5 reviews	
43	Lisa	Alter Ego	58	6 reviews	
44	21 Savage	What Happened to the Streets?	56	4 reviews	
45	Lil Baby	WHAM	55	4 reviews	
46	PartyNextDoor & Drake	Some Sexy Songs 4 U	54	7 reviews	
47	Lil Wayne	Tha Carter VI	50	6 reviews	
48	Young Thug	UY Scuti	50	4 reviews	
49	JackBoys & Travis Scott	JackBoys 2	48	6 reviews	
50	Will Smith	Based on a True Story	41	7 reviews	

== See also ==
- Previous article: 2024 in hip-hop
- Next article: 2026 in hip-hop
