= Delcat Idengo =

Congolese musician (1993–2025)

- Born: Delphin Katembo Vinywasiki; 15 September 1993; Beni, Zaire (modern-day Democratic Republic of the Congo)
- Died: 13 February 2025 (aged 31); Goma, North Kivu, Democratic Republic of the Congo
- Occupations: Singer; songwriter; rapper
- Musical career
- Genres: Hip hop; ndombolo
- Instruments: Vocals; DAW; sampler

Delphin Katembo Vinywasiki (15 September 1993 – 13 February 2025), better known by the stage name Delcat Idengo, was a Congolese singer-songwriter and rapper.

== Life and career ==
Born in Beni on 15 September 1993, Idengo was imprisoned several times for his opposition to the authoritarian regimes in the DR Congo. Known for his revolutionary style, he used his music to denounce social injustice, particularly the violence in the east of the country. In May 2018, he released Tout le monde est fâché, which met with some success. In February 2021, he was arrested for the release of Politiciens escrocs, in which he criticized the broken promises of Congolese politicians. However, he was acquitted in a Beni court the following month. In October 2021, he was arrested again after accusations of incitement to violence were made against him. In December 2021, he was sentenced to ten years in prison. After serving part of his sentence, he was released in December 2023 after a pardon from President Félix Tshisekedi.

== Death ==
By January 2025, Idengo became vocal in condemning the M23 rebel group and the Allied Democratic Forces (ADF), labeling them as occupying forces in Goma and accusing them of fueling violence, displacement, and insecurity in the region. His latest song, "Bundukiza Kwetu" ("Our Guns"), which he uploaded to his YouTube channel on 12 February, the day before his death, carried a strong message against these groups. In the song, he accused M23, ADF, and CODECO of operating under different names while pursuing the same objective of seizing Congolese territory. The lyrics explicitly denounced their actions, stating, "They kill us, loot us, steal from us, and rape us, but this time we will resist. We will not give in. We will even use stones to defend ourselves if necessary". His words served as a call for the Congolese people to mobilize and resist ongoing violence and occupation attempts.

Less than 48 hours after the release of "Bundukiza Kwetu", on the afternoon of 13 February, Idengo was shot and killed by M23 fighters in Goma. Audio and video evidence reviewed by Human Rights Watch indicate that armed men arrived at Idengo's house in jeeps, prompting him to attempt an escape before being gunned down. Videos and photographs of the aftermath showed multiple wounds on his head, arms, and right hand. Independent forensic experts concluded that Idengo appeared to have been shielding his head with his arms when he was shot. M23's spokesperson, Lawrence Kanyuka, confirmed the group's responsibility for the killing and accused Idengo of being a member of Lutte Pour Le Changement (LUCHA), a nonviolent movement in the DRC advocating for human rights and transparent governance. Kanyuka justified the attack by stating that "We had forbidden the population from wearing military insignia... We found him at his house wearing military insignia during a sweep".

Conflicting reports emerged regarding the clothing Idengo was wearing at the time of his death. While some media sources stated that he had been filming a music video when he was shot, photographs circulated on social media depicted him in different outfits. Some images showed him wearing military-style camouflage pants, while others described him in white pants embroidered with a Congolese flag, suggesting that his clothing may have been altered after his death. Notably, no weapons were visible in the available photographs. The killing was widely condemned, with government spokesperson Patrick Muyaya Katembwe denouncing it as "abominable". Opposition leader Martin Fayulu also labeled it an assassination and called for a ceasefire in response to the incident.
