= DJ Chosen Few =

Dutch DJ and music producer (1972–2025)

- Born: Michel François Prijt; 5 February 1972; Amsterdam, Netherlands
- Died: 14 October 2025 (aged 53)
- Occupations: DJ, music producer

Michel François Prijt (5 February 1972 – 14 October 2025), better known by his stage name DJ Chosen Few, was a Dutch DJ and music producer.

Prijt was considered a pioneer of the Dutch electronic dance music scene.

== Life and career ==
Born in Amsterdam on 5 February 1972, Prijt grew up in a poor neighborhood southeast of the city. Around 1984, he became a graffiti artist and began composing hip-hop music and breakbeat. In 1993, he collaborated with DJ Dano and DJ The Prophet for his first booking outside the Netherlands, which occurred in Austria. He then grew his fanbase, playing hardcore music around festivals, such as Mysteryland, Mayday, Thunderdome, and Hellraiser. In 1997, he mixed the album Flashpoint for the group Fear Factory as part of the record label Mokum Records. In 2008, he mixed The Last City on Earth for the music festival In Qontrol.

DJ Chosen Few died on 14 October 2025, at the age of 53.

== Discography ==
=== Studio albums ===
- In the Name of the DJ (1998)

=== EPs ===
- Freedom / Wicked (1993)
- Chosen Anthem (1993)
- Take Me 2 the Top (1994)
- Fuck You Up (1994)
- Party! / After Hourz (1994)
- Feel the Dream (1994)
- Love Me Bad (1995)
- Bring the Beat Back (1996)
- Ø Chøsen (1996)
- Tegen de gevestigde orde EP (2003)
- Kold Dayz (2004)
- Day One (2005)
- Ëбаный Хардкор (2005)
- Chosen Paradize (2006)
- Mokum World Wide (2007)
- Da Funky Beatz (2008)
- Legendary (2009)
- Walk in the Dark (2015)
- Fucking Hardcore (2017)
