= Dorcci =

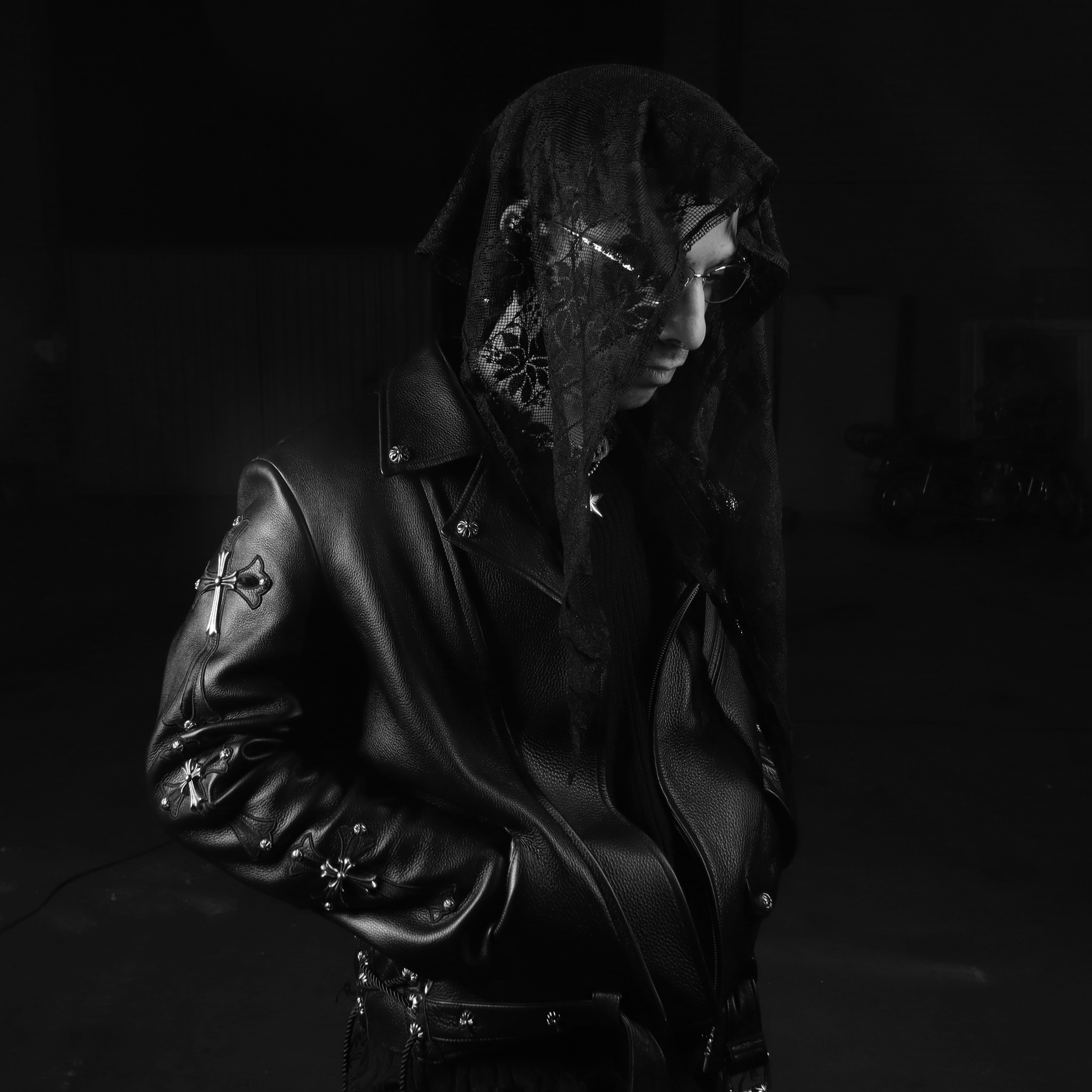
- Dorcci in 2025

Background information
- Born: Mohammad Rashidian Dorcheh; 5 August 1995 (age 31); Karaj, Iran
- Genres: Hip hop, Persian rap, trap music, melodic trap, mumble rap
- Instruments: Flute, vocals
- Years active: 2020–present
- Label: Love6boyz
- Website: youngmorvarid.com

Mohammad Rashidian Dorcheh (born August 5, 1995), known professionally as Dorcci, is an Iranian singer and rapper. His music includes Persian rap and trap styles.

== Life and career ==
Dorcci is one of the fourth-generation rappers of Persian rap. He began his career in 2020 with the song "Tolou" (Sunrise). His unique voice and style quickly attracted a large audience with tracks like "Pileh" (Cocoon), "Memphis," and "Damn Things." In an interview on the program "An Hour with the Underground," he shared that he had faced many challenges before finally releasing his first song.

On August 7, 2023, he released a song titled "Damn Things", which gained significant attention on social media and music platforms.

== Arrest and detention ==
On August 28, 2023, Dorcci was arrested by Iranian security forces for releasing the song "Damn Things," which contained explicit lyrics. He was released shortly after on bail.

== Discography ==
=== Studio albums ===
Studio albums
Title	Details
Young Morvarid	Released: February 22, 2025: Label: Love6boyz; Format: Digital download, streaming; Genre: Hip hop, Alternative Rap, R&B, Trap, Melodic Trap, Mumble Rap; Length: 36:38; Producers: Therichpia, Arda

=== Singles ===
Title	Release date	Producer(s)	Length
"Sunrise (Freestyle)"	December 13, 2020	Dorcci	2:27
"Misozam"	November 27, 2021	Dorcci	2:22
"Kalafegi"	April 4, 2022	Dorcci	3:56
"TYP"	May 3, 2022	Dorcci	2:51
"PILE"	May 11, 2022	Dorcci	2:58
"PAINFUL LOVE"	August 10, 2022	Dorcci	2:22
"Memphis"	July 18, 2022	Dorcci	2:52
"RIRI"	July 26, 2022	Dorcci	2:40
"Ghatle Amd"	April 10, 2024	Dorcci	3:36
"Omran"	February 4, 2023	Dorcci	1:47
"Tariktarin"	February 24, 2023	Dorcci	3:22
"Crazy"	March 21, 2023	Dorcci	2:23
"Legendary"	April 25, 2023	Dorcci	3:38
"Insincere"	May 10, 2023	Dorcci	3:05
"Eshgh"	July 18, 2023	Dorcci	4:05
"B HESSI"	July 19, 2023	Dorcci	3:36
"Damn Things"	August 7, 2023	Dorcci	3:48
"RIRI"	July 26, 2022	Dorcci	2:40
"Before You Gone"	February 1, 2024	Dorcci	2:57
"Morvarid"	March 11, 2024	Dorcci	4:09
"SOOT"	March 29, 2024	Dorcci	3:16
"Ni"	April 13, 2024	Dorcci	4:03
"Surprise"	April 22, 2024	Dorcci, Dariush	3:40
"Ghatle Amd"	April 10, 2024	Dorcci	3:36
"Etemad Nadaram Bet"	June 1, 2024	Dorcci	3:09
"Behesht"	July 3, 2024	Dorcci	3:20
"Million"	July 25, 2024	Dorcci	2:12
"IDK"	September 13, 2024	Dorcci, LOY	3:49
"H2CO3"	October 29, 2024	Dorcci	2:17
"MOFT FREESTYLE"	December 11, 2025	Dorcci	3:27
"LAST CHANCE"	December 26, 2025	Dorcci	4:02
"EDGEBAR"	August 5, 2026	Dorcci	2:22
"WIND"	September 23, 2026	Dorcci	2:47

== See also ==
- Persian hip hop
- Iranian hip hop
- Persian rap
- Music of Iran
