= Rilès =

Franco-Algerian musician

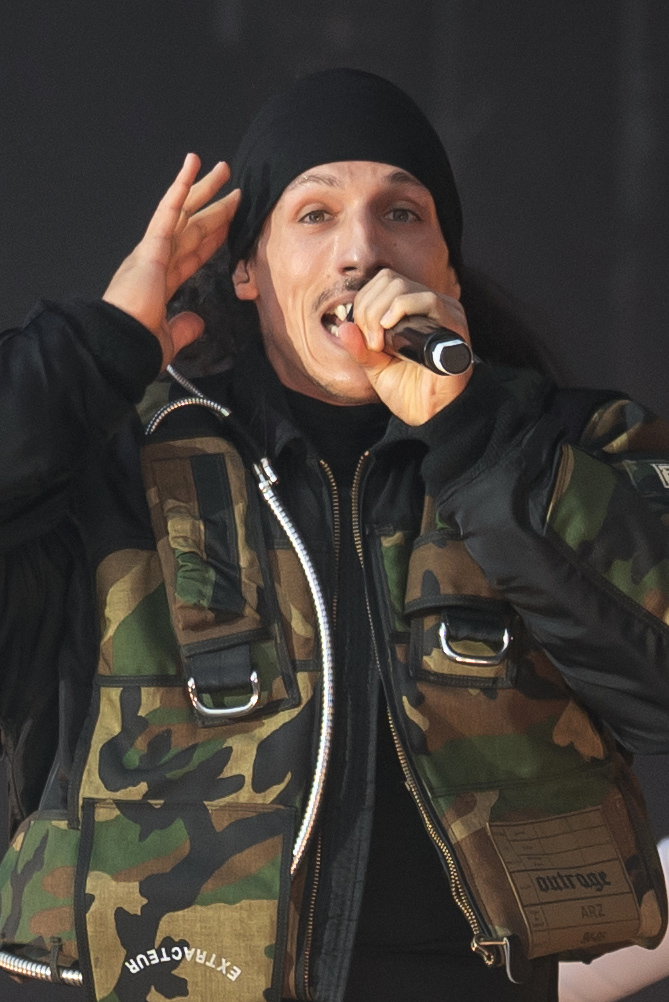
- Rilès at Art Sonic festival in 2025.

Background information
- Born: Rilès Kacimi; January 4, 1996 (age 30); Rouen, France
- Genres: Hip-Hop, Rap, Soul, RnB
- Occupations: singer, rapper
- Years active: 2014-now
- Website: www.rilesundayz.com

Rilès Kacimi (/rɪˈlɛs/ ril-ESS; غيلاس قاسمي; born 4 January 1996) is a Franco-Algerian songwriter, composer, record producer and performance artist from Rouen, Normandy. His songs are mainly written and performed in English, with some in French, Spanish, Portuguese and even Japanese.

== Biography ==
=== Beginnings ===
Born in France, Rilès started making music at a very early age by learning guitar and making YouTube covers. After obtaining a bachelor's degree, he decided to focus solely on music as a career. Rilès studied English literature at the University of Rouen while studying music on his own in his free time. He worked as a supervisor for a while to save up enough money and build his own home-studio in his bedroom. He then began to compose and write music independently. Rilès is also talented in arts. He sells his pieces of art as a way to make extra money for his music career. Rilès started his own music career by writing, producing, and mastering his own songs, as well as recording, directing and editing his music videos. This is reflected in his song lyrics where he references recording and producing his music independently.

=== First albums ===
He released his first album, Vanity Plus Mind (2015) and released a variety of singles such as “Brothers” which became a staple and one of his biggest hits in 2016. That same year he released one song per week, every Sunday, for a year to compile into his second “album” (more a collection of songs than an album) called “RILÈSUNDAYZ” which is made up of 52 songs. This includes songs “I Do it”, “Pesetas” and “Should I”, as some of the most popular songs. He organised in a concert tour in France in 2017 during which he performed at the Bataclan in Paris, twice, then at the Zenith of Rouen.

In summer 2019,he released his first studio album Welcome to the Jungle.

=== Survival Mode and The 25th Hour ===
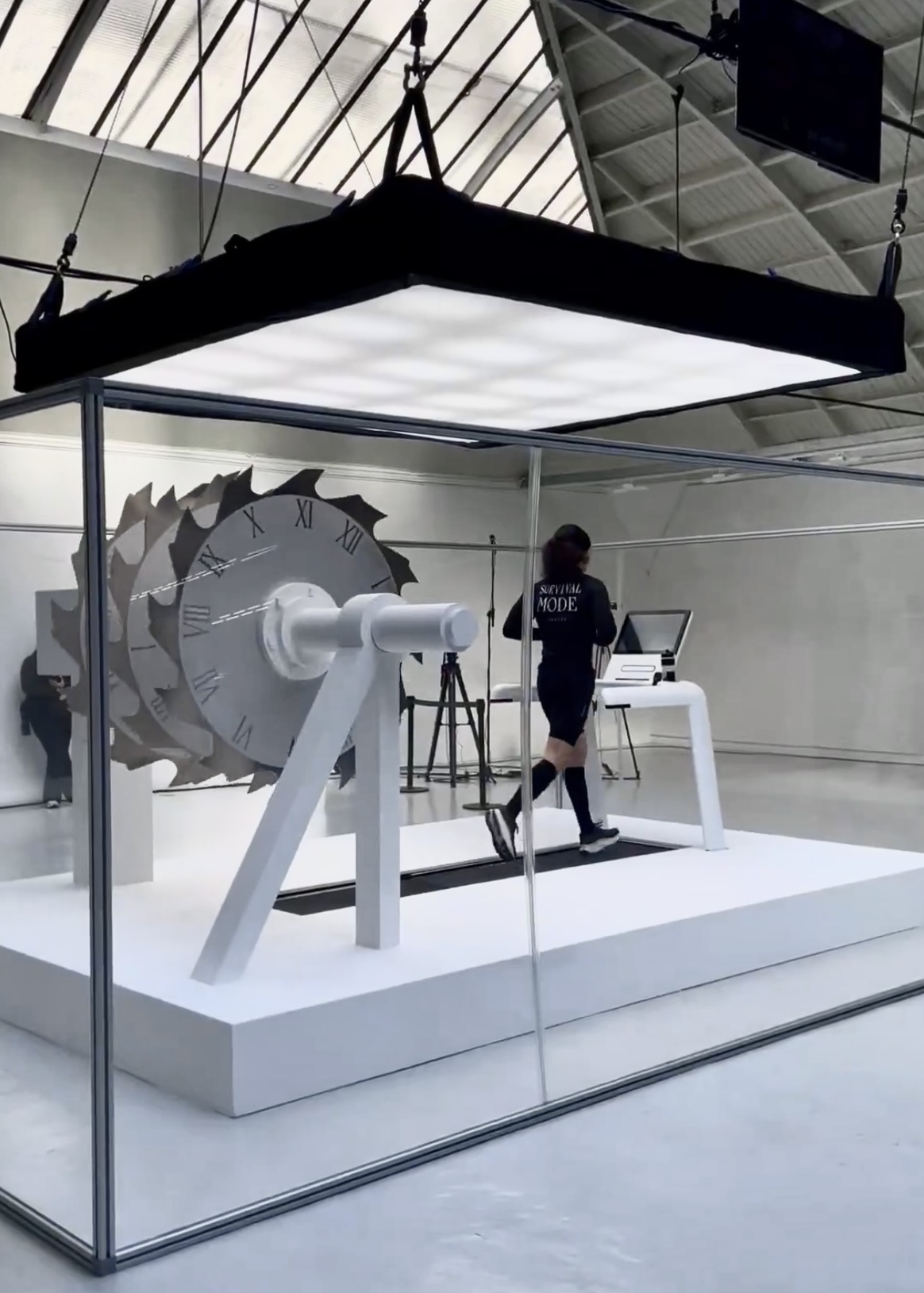
Rilès during his 24-hour "Survival Run" in 2025.

In January 2025, Rilès released his second studio album, Survival Mode, six years after his debut. The record comprises fourteen tracks, featuring collaborations with Tif and Gracy Hopkins, and reflects the challenges the artist faced over the preceding two years, as well as his internal struggles.

From 8 to 9 February 2025, Rilès performed a "Survival Run", a 24‑hour treadmill marathon conducted in front of a large circular saw inside a glass arena at Espace Commines, an event location in Paris. The event, open to the public, was streamed live on YouTube and TikTok. It was intended to parallel the themes of his new album and explore concepts of resilience and human limits. Rilès had previously run for twelve consecutive hours in September 2024 without the saw; during the 2025 run he covered more than 200 km, completing the first 61 km in 6 hours 2 minutes. He has cited running and personal relationships as factors that helped him overcome periods of severe personal difficulty, including suicide attempts.

On 24 October 2025, Rilès issued a follow‑up album titled The 25th Hour. He staged a performance on 24–25 October at Espace Commines, during which he applied a red imprint of his right hand to 20,000 physical copies of his album - reference to the tegata handprints left by Japanese sumo wrestlers. The performance lasted 25 hours, exceeding the planned 24‑hour duration. The event was broadcast live on YouTube and could also be viewed through plexiglass windows installed at the venue.

In 2026, Rilès embarked on his Survival Tour, a concert series covering eleven cities across France, as well as venues in Belgium and Switzerland, to promote The 25th Hour.

== Discography ==
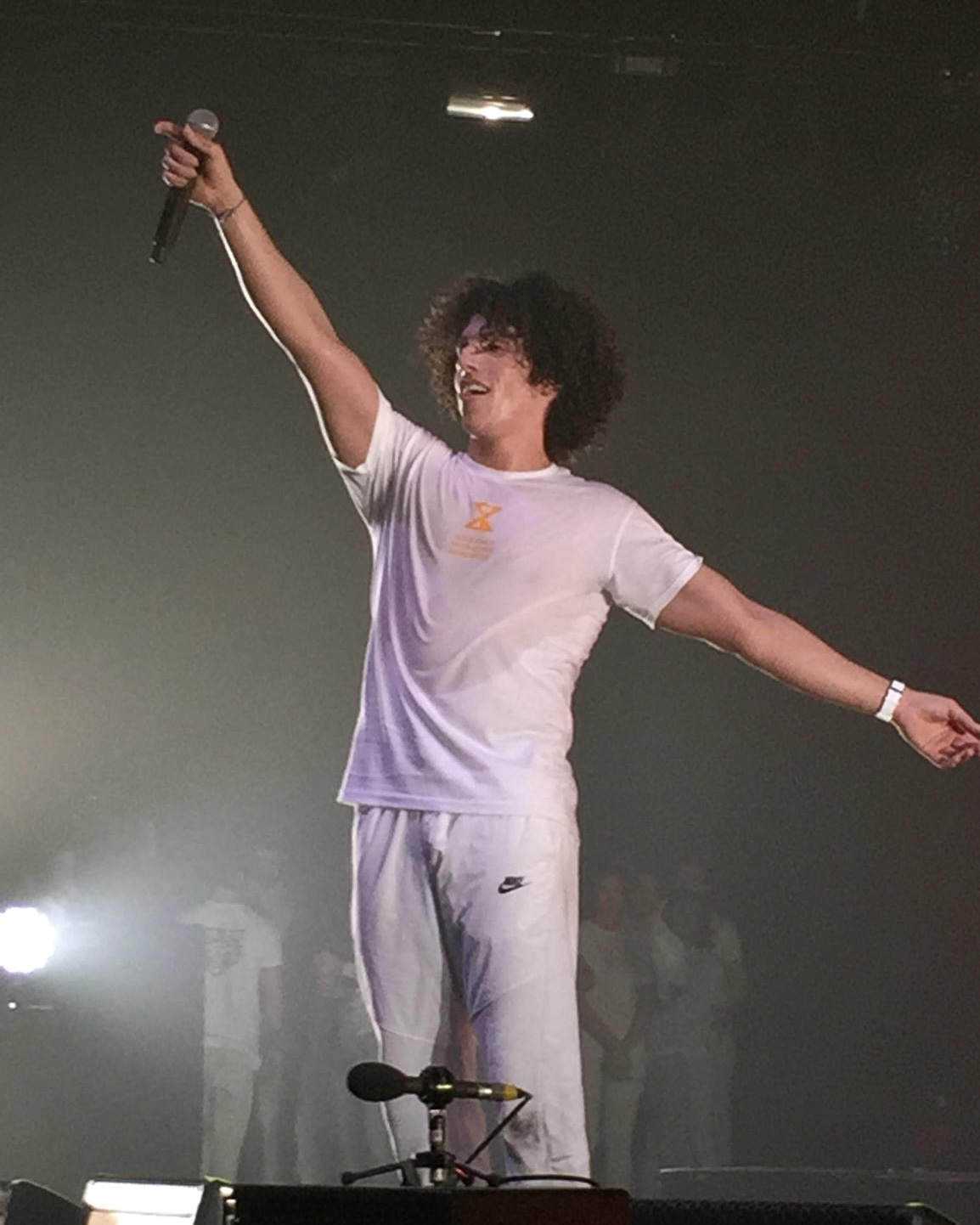
Rilès in concert in his home town of Rouen in 2017.

=== Studio albums ===
- 2019: Welcome to the Jungle
- 2025: Survival Mode
- 2025: The 25th Hour

=== EPs ===
- 2015: Vanity Plus Mind
- 2020: LVL 36

=== Singles ===
Year	Title	Peak positions	Album
Year	Title	FR	Album
2014	"S.AME"		Vanity Plus Mind
2014	"QUILOMBO"		Vanity Plus Mind
2014	"SUN TZU"		Vanity Plus Mind
2014	"Guerriero"		Vanity Plus Mind
2014	"Pintor"		Vanity Plus Mind
2014	"Blood & Bones		Vanity Plus Mind
2014	"Pussy From Wayne"		Vanity Plus Mind
2014	"HEADACHE"		
2015	"WHO CARES"		
2015	"NOWADAYS"		
2015	"Another Complaint, But.."	185	
2016	"Brothers"	31	
2016	"College Dropout"		
2016	"OHAMAMA"		
2016	"Should I"	147	
2016	"Earthquake"		
2016	"Drop It Like It's on Fire"		
2016	"For Mama"		
2016	"U Better Listen"		
2016	"Gotta Lotta"		
2016	"Thank God"		Welcome to the Jungle
2016	"I'll Try"		
2016	"No Lie"		
2016	"The Hearthbreak"		
2016	"E Knows"		
2016	"Rebeus in Oran"		
2016	"Empire"		
2016	"A Happy New Year"		
2016	"I Do It"	48	
2017	"U Like"		
2017	"GTFO"		
2017	"In the Jungle"	121	
2017	"Those Nights"		
2017	"I Love It"		
2017	"Rilès"		
2017	"Enjoy The Ride"		
2017	"PKMN"		
2017	"Alive"		
2017	"REMEDY"		
2017	"Away"	171	
2017	"Blood On My Lips"		
2017	"It's Just the Beginning"		
2017	"Love The Way You Dance"		
2017	"EVIL"		
2017	"The Cleaning Lady"		
2017	"Eastside Georgia"		
2017	"MOST WANTED"		
2017	"Real Talk"		
2017	"Pesetas"	179	
2017	"Utopia"		Welcome to the Jungle
2017	"Snakes..!"		
2017	"After The Darkness"		
2017	"Understood"		
2017	"Dontreallyknow"		
2017	"ENERGY"		
2017	Ain't Even Started"		
2017	"MAILLE"		
2017	"Unexpected"		
2017	"Show Must Go On"		
2017	"NSFW"		
2017	"Una Vez Más"		
2017	"No Sleep"		
2017	"CHAMPION"		
2017	⏳		
2018	"!I'll Be Back!"	103	
2018	"!LOST!"		
2019	"My Soul"		
2019	"Remind Me"		
2019	"Sugarbabe"		
2019	"U RIGHT?"		
2019	"Admiration"		Welcome to the Jungle
2019	"No Tears"		Welcome to the Jungle
2019	"E a verdade"		Welcome to the Jungle
2019	"Queen"		Welcome to the Jungle
2019	"Ultimatum"		Welcome to the Jungle
2019	"Against The Clock"		Welcome to the Jungle
2019	"Marijuana"		Welcome to the Jungle
2019	"Myself N The Sea"		Welcome to the Jungle
2019	"Old Dayz"		Welcome to the Jungle
2019	"Rage 137"		Welcome to the Jungle
2019	"I Love You"		Welcome to the Jungle
2019	"Are You A Star?"		Welcome to the Jungle
2019	"Manslaughter"		Welcome to the Jungle
2019	"Run!"		Welcome to the Jungle
2019	"Yousatonmymind"		Welcome to the Jungle
2020	"LET IT GO"		LVL 36
2020	"FEELINGS"		LVL 36
2020	"KEEP IT SEXY"		LVL 36
2020	"GOA"		LVL 36
2021	"SOUL SPEECH"		
2021	"HOLD IT DOWN"		
2021	"PICK IT UP"		
2021	"JUVENILE"		
2021	"DAYS ON THE WALL"		
2021	"STITCHES"		
2021	"WORST BEHAVIOUR"		
2021	"1000 REASONS"		
2021	"STILL THE SAME MAMACITA"		
2021	"2 BRAINZ"		
2021	"WASSUP"		
2021	"THE HEARTBREAK v2"		
2021	"BERIZ"		
2021	"FOR THE SHOW"		
2021	"STEEL INSIDE"		
2021	"ON MY PHONE"		
2021	"WHYYOUWALKIN?"		
2021	"BORN LIKE THIS"		
2021	"I WISH I HAD THE TIME"		
2021	"WAVEFORMS"		
2021	"LET'S GO"		
2021	"LA MANIA"		
2021	"BETTER DAYS"		
2021	"FREEMAN FREESTYLE"		
2021	"BIG PLANS"		
2021	"INDUSTRY GAMES"		
2021	"N.G.W"		
2021	"LONELY NIGHTS"		
2021	"INSTINCT"		
2021	"YA HABIBI YA"		
2021	"CRAZY"		
2021	"DAMNED?"		
2021	"BLESSINGS"		
2021	"BABY MAMA RAINY DAY"		
2021	"ANNIE WANTS MORE"		
2021	"MOONTALK"		
2021	"22 'TILL INFINITY"		
2021	"CHILLS"		
2021	"SOMEONE ELSE"		
2021	"CAN'T STOP"		
2021	"DOWN ON ME"		
2021	"LOST IN MY WORLD"		
2021	"4AM"		
2021	"RILESINTERNATIONAL"		
2021	"GOLDEN"		
2021	"TIME CHAMBER"		
2021	"LAA SAUUUCE"		
2021	"ON GOD"		
2021	"BURNING STAR"		
2025	"SURVIVAL"		SURVIVAL MODE
2025	"BIG TROUBLE"		SURVIVAL MODE
2025	"IT IS NOT A MISTAKE IF IT GOES IN CIRCLE"		SURVIVAL MODE
2025	"NO REGRETS"		SURVIVAL MODE
2025	"MONEY TREES"		SURVIVAL MODE
2025	"BEAST!"		SURVIVAL MODE
2025	"PARADISE"		SURVIVAL MODE
2025	"INTERLUDE"		SURVIVAL MODE
2025	"DEAD OR ALIVE"		SURVIVAL MODE
2025	"OBVIOUS"		SURVIVAL MODE
2025	"DON'T LIE"		SURVIVAL MODE
2025	"SAVE MY MIND"		SURVIVAL MODE
2025	"HOME"		SURVIVAL MODE
2025	"READY TO DIE"		SURVIVAL MODE
2025	"Pressure"		The 25th Hour
2025	"I Thought"		The 25th Hour
2025	"The Devil's in the City"		The 25th Hour
2025	"Leaving the City"		The 25th Hour
2025	"Justice & Peace"		The 25th Hour
2025	"Sometimes"		The 25th Hour
2025	"Business Is Business"		The 25th Hour
2025	"Don't Cry My Love"		The 25th Hour
2025	"Stay Clean"		The 25th Hour
2025	"Pinky Promise"		The 25th Hour
2025	"End of Survival"		The 25th Hour

== Awards and nominations ==
=== Berlin Music Video Awards ===
The Berlin Music Video Awards is an international festival that promotes the art of music videos.

Year	Nominated work	Award	Result	Ref.
2025	"Save my Mind"	Best Animation	Nominated	
