= Ghais Guevara =

American rapper, record producer and political activist (born 2000)

- Also known as: Goyard Ibn Said
- Born: Jaja Gha'is Robinson; Philadelphia, Pennsylvania, US
- Genres: Hardcore hip hop; political hip hop; alternative hip hop
- Occupations: Rapper; songwriter
- Instrument: Vocals
- Years active: 2019–present
- Label: Fat Possum

Jaja Gha'is Robinson, known professionally as Ghais Guevara and Goyard Ibn Said, is an American rapper, record producer and political activist from Philadelphia. He garnered attention as Ghais Guevara with the release of his mixtape BlackBolshevik. Guevara is known for his expression of communist ideologies in his lyrics.

== Career ==
=== 2020–2022: BlackBolshevik and There Will be No Super-Slave ===
Robinson released the EP Black August Pack on October 8, 2021. On July 16, 2022, he released his second mixtape, There Will be No Super-Slave, which earned praise from figures such as YouTuber and music critic Anthony Fantano. There Will be No Super-Slave's title is inspired by George Jackson's book Blood in My Eye. Robinson utilized criticism of the mixtape in future releases.

=== 2023–2025: Goyard Ibn Said and The Other 2/5ths ===
Robinson debuted another alias in 2023, Goyard Ibn Said, inspired by Omar ibn Said. Robinson released a mixtape, Goyard Comin': Exordium on June 2, 2023. Robinson signed with Fat Possum records in September 2024 and Goyard Ibn Said, Robinson's first album with the label, was released on January 24, 2025. The lead single, "The Old Guard is Dead," played shortly before and after Kendrick Lamar's halftime performance at the Super Bowl LIX.

On March 9, 2026, Robinson released Goyard & The Kayfabe Reveal. The LP continues the saga of Goyard Ibn Said and features readings from Friedrich Nietzsche, Gilles Deleuze, Félix Guattari, and Lacanian psychoanalyst Bruce Fink.

== Influences and themes ==
Robinson draws inspiration from a diverse array of musical influences, citing figures such as Jermaine Dupri, 50 Cent, Lauryn Hill, Outkast, and Yasiin Bey as pivotal to his creative development. Inspired by Outkast and Andre 3000's lyrical delivery, he uses experimentation and eclecticism in his own work.

=== Political activism ===
Robinson’s music is characterized by a strong emphasis on political themes and ideological expression. Known for his chaotic, confronting, and cathartic style, Guevara explores themes of Black pain, violence, and joy in his music, often intertwining them with communist ideologies. In an interview with Vice, he stated, "there's no other rapper doing geopolitical communist rap". Guevara's lyrics often address societal issues, with tracks like "Fuck The Nordic Model" and "Mimicry Of The Settlers" critiquing imperialism and colonial powers.
