= 700 Reasons =

Mixtape by Montana 700
- Released: February 7, 2025
- Genres: Hip-hop; Southern hip-hop; trap
- Length: 40:23
- Label: Remain Solid / 300 Entertainment
- Producers: BeatByYayo; Chopsquad DJ; Danylo Kuzmych; DeeKey; Don Reid; Fuelz; Gcode; Goldgrain; HBK Cheese; King Osama; Kongo Seth; Krazydro; Lala the DJ; LoneGud; Quin With The Keyz; Tayko Beats; Two4; Vega Heartbreak; WNS Beats; ZiggyMadeIt

Montana 700 chronology
70042 (2024)	700 Reasons (2025)

Singles from 700 Reasons
- 1. "Back Door" Released: November 1, 2024; 2. "Count a Hunnit" Released: November 29, 2024; 3. "Brinks Truck" Released: January 17, 2025; 4. "Joy Road to Camp Wisdom" Released: February 6, 2025; 5. "Red Lights" Released: February 6, 2025

700 Reasons is the debut mixtape by American rapper Montana 700. It was released on February 7, 2025, via Remain Solid / 300 Entertainment. The mixtape features guest appearances from BigXthaPlug, Tee Grizzley, Hunxho, Peezy, and longtime collaborator Zillionaire Doe. It also features production from record producers such as Chopsquad DJ, ZiggyMadeIt, and Fuelz.

== Background and promotion ==
The mixtape was part of a series of projects released in early 2025 by the "main faces" of the emerging "New Dallas" movement, sandwiched in between Zillionaire Doe’s D Boi Dreams in January and HeadHuncho Amir's STILL AIN NUN BIGGER in May.

700 Reasons marked Montana 700's debut mixtape, following the 2024 release of "70042", a collaborative album with Zillionaire Doe. In a promotional video posted to his Instagram account, Montana 700 popped champagne with his friends in front of a mural and declared that he could finally make a living off music.

== Composition ==
The mixtape comprises 15 songs, some of which had been previously released. It includes a remix of Montana 700's hit song "Pipeline", featuring fellow Dallas rapper BigXthaPlug.

In an interview with the Dallas Observer, Montana 700 said that "Robert Horry" was the most meaningful song on the album for him, explaining:

To do what I’m doing is like winning a championship in the streets. To be able to switch lanes, find another way to make money, feed your family, and build generational wealth, that’s like winning a championship. I’m the last one. All my partners are dead or in jail. I can count on my fingers how many partners I have left. I ain’t over 25. I had partners since I was 15.

== Title and packaging ==
The mixtape's title refers to the 700 block of Ivywood Drive in Dallas, which was "where it all started" for Montana 700. In a similar tribute, the front cover was shot at his local corner store while the back cover was shot at the gravesite of Mark Dean Burnough, a close friend of his who died in 2017 at the age of 17.

== Critical reception ==
Shawn Grant of The Source commented that Montana 700 "blends the raw energy of his city with a deep respect for the Dirty South’s legacy, delivering tracks that celebrate ambition, resilience, and street success." He also said that the mixtape "is a testament to Montana’s ability to merge classic Southern rap elements with modern energy", adding that it "delivers booming 808s, soulful pianos, and high-energy horns that capture the essence of true trap music".

Bryson "Boom" Paul of HotNewHipHop praised the mixtape's high energy and lyricism, adding that "Montana’s charisma fuels the project, reviving the spirit of early Cash Money, No Limit, and Grand Hustle while carving out his own lane." He also wrote: "Montana delivers a hard-hitting sound laced with booming 808s, rolling pianos, and triumphant horn stabs. His lyrics paint a vivid picture of the hustle, capturing the highs, lows, and relentless drive to make it out." Eric Diep of the Dallas Observer wrote that the mixtape "represents a motivational story of changing up hustles and leaving trapping behind to be a full-time rapper". He added: "Montana 700 talks in depth about the trap like his past is interfering with his present life, depicting those experiences in vivid detail."

== Track listing ==
Credits adapted from Genius.

700 Reasons
No.	Title	Writer(s)	Producer(s)	Length
1.	"(Intro) Open Thoughts"	Anthony McDowell	Vega Heartbreak	3:23
2.	"Pipeline" (featuring BigXthaPlug)	Anthony McDowell	ZiggyMadeIt	2:38
3.	"Free Duce"	Anthony McDowell	Kongo Seth; Two4	2:40
4.	"Count a Hunnit"	Anthony McDowell; Byron Thomas; Jay Jenkins	BeatByYayo; Krazydro; Quin With The Keyz	3:27
5.	"Call My Bluff" (featuring Zillionaire Doe)	Anthony McDowell; Armondo Griffin	Two4	2:11
6.	"Million Dollar Run" (featuring Peezy)	Anthony McDowell	Fuelz	2:16
7.	"Brinks Truck"	Anthony McDowell	Fuelz	2:30
8.	"Joy Road to Camp Wisdom" (featuring Tee Grizzley)	Anthony McDowell; Phillips Speaks	Chopsquad DJ	2:22
9.	"Thinking About Millions"	Anthony McDowell	Danylo Kuzmych; WNS Beats; Goldgrain	3:36
10.	"Wit a Boss"	Anthony McDowell	Two4; Kongo Seth	2:26
11.	"Red Lights" (featuring Hunxho)	Anthony McDowell	Fuelz; Gcode; HBK Cheese	2:35
12.	"Back Door"	Anthony McDowell	King Osama; Lala the DJ; Tayko Beats	2:34
13.	"Dogshit"	Anthony McDowell	Two4; Kongo Seth	2:11
14.	"2am in ATL"	Anthony McDowell	Don Reid; LoneGud	2:36
15.	"Robert Horry"	Anthony McDowell	DeeKey	2:52
Total length:				40:23

Sample credits

- "Count a Hunnit" contains a sample of "And Then What", written by Jay Jenkins and Byron Thomas, as performed by Jeezy.
- "Million Dollar Run" contains a sample of "Still Fly", written and performed by the Big Tymers.
