= Montana 700 =

American rapper

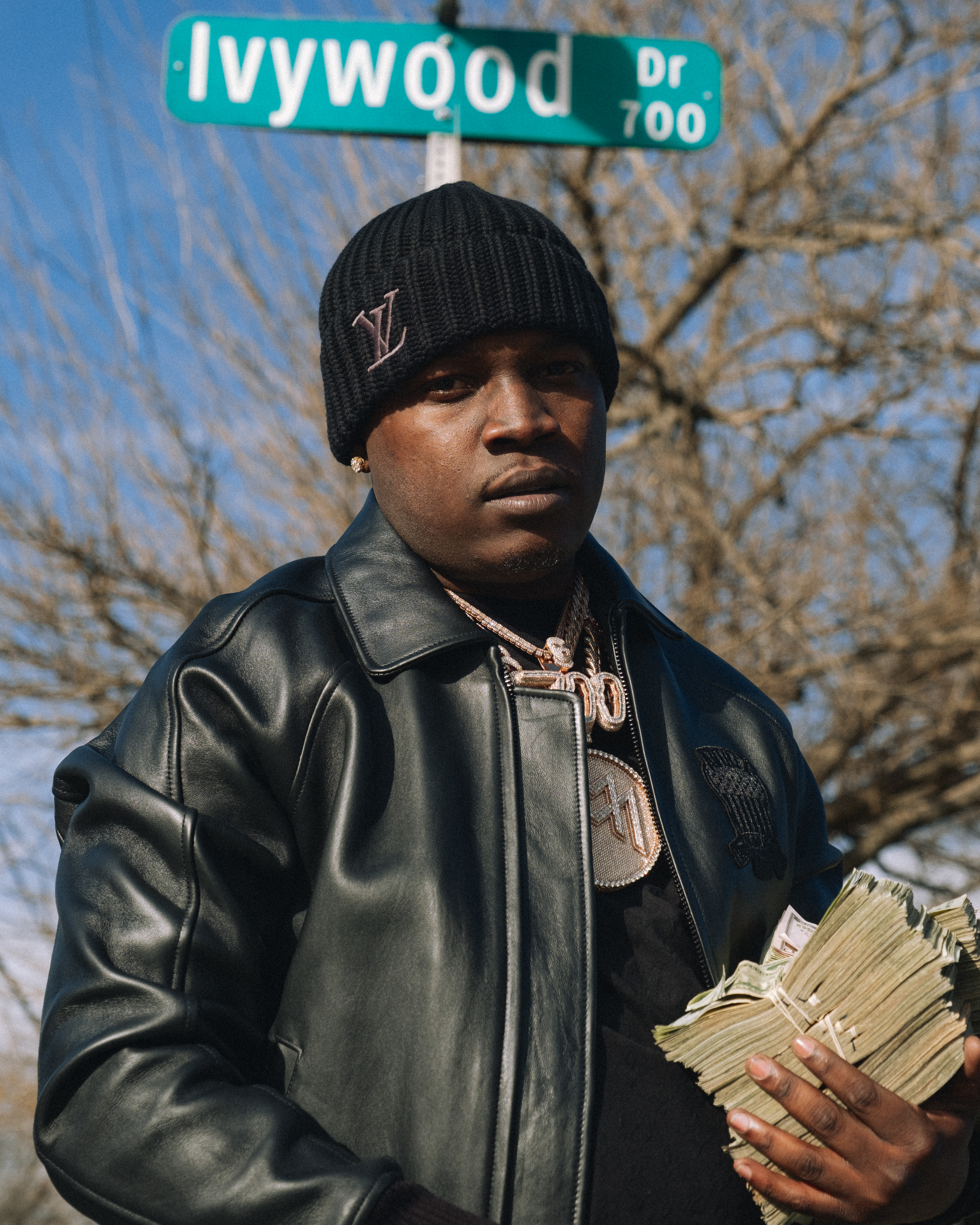

Background information
- Born: Tony McDowell; Oak Cliff, Dallas, Texas, U.S.
- Origin: Dallas, Texas, U.S.
- Genres: Hip-hop; Southern rap
- Occupations: Rapper, songwriter
- Years active: 2020–present
- Labels: 300 Entertainment, Remain Solid

Tony McDowell, known professionally as Montana 700, is an American rapper from Oak Cliff, Dallas, Texas. He has gained attention in Southern hip-hop through singles such as Pipeline and Count a Hunnit. His work is associated with the "New Dallas" rap movement.

He released his debut mixtape, 700 Reasons, in February 2025.

== Career ==
Montana 700's music incorporates storytelling and themes related to urban life. In the summer of 2024, in collaboration with Dallas rapper Zillionaire Doe, he released 70042.

The music video for Count a Hunnit accumulated over one million views within a month of its release, and his music has surpassed seven million streams across various platforms.

Montana 700 has performed at several events, including a headlining show at Dallas Headquarters and as a surprise guests with Moneybagg Yo & Rod Wave in 2025.

In February 2025, he released his debut mixtape, 700 Reasons. The project features collaborations with artists such as BigXThaPlug, Tee Grizzley, Hunxho, Peezy, and Zillionaire Doe. The mixtape blends classic Southern rap elements with modern energy.

Montana 700 has received support from artists such as YTB Fatt, Yella Beezy, and Bossman Dlow. He has also appeared on platforms like On The Radar, Off The Porch, and From The Block, which feature interviews and performances by hip-hop artists.

== Discography ==
=== Mixtapes ===
- 700 Reasons (2025)
- The Greatest of All Traps (2025)

=== Collaborative albums ===
- 70042 (with Zillionaire Doe) (2024)

=== Extended plays ===
- The One (2022)
- Omertà (2023)
