= Goyard Ibn Said =

Studio album by Ghais Guevara
- Released: January 24, 2025
- Genres: Hardcore hip-hop; alternative hip-hop
- Length: 53:45
- Label: Fat Possum

Ghais Guevara chronology
Goyard Comin': Exordium (2023)	Goyard Ibn Said (2025)	The Other 2/5ths or: The Absolutely True Diary of a Part-Time Trench Baby (2025)

Singles from Goyard Ibn Said
- 1. "Leprosy" Released: September 25, 2024; 2. "Camera Shy" Released: October 29, 2024; 3. "4L" Released: December 4, 2024; 4. "The Old Guard Is Dead" Released: January 3, 2025; 5. "Bystander Effect" Released: January 21, 2025

Goyard Ibn Said is the debut album by American rapper Ghais Guevara, released through Fat Possum Records on January 24, 2025. It is Guevara's first full-length studio album, following a series of self-released mixtapes. The release is framed as a concept album in two acts. It follows the fictitious titular character, an up-and-coming rapper from North Philadelphia, through the highs and lows of rap stardom.

== Background ==
The album's title predates the beginning of its development; the name first appeared in 2023 as an alias under which Guevara released the mixtape Goyard Comin': Exordium, described on its Bandcamp release page as "[t]he prequel to the Goyard Ibn Said arc." It derives from the name of Omar ibn Said, a black Islamic scholar from West Africa who was enslaved and allegedly converted to Christianity in the United States during the transatlantic slave trade. Guevara has said he finds Said's life story analogous to the experience of entering the music industry.

Guevara began work on Goyard Ibn Said in early 2024.

The album's cover artwork adapts the painting After the Hurricane by Winslow Homer.

== Music and lyrics ==
The album is divided into two acts, bookended by non-diegetic narration and skits. "Introduction to Act One" is a comedy skit voiced by FARO, Zen dash, and Luke Dash. Throughout the following seven tracks, Guevara performs the role of protagonist Goyard Ibn Said, chronicling his ambitious and triumphant rise to rap fame. The music of the first act is upbeat, with trap- and drill-influenced rhythms and lyrics that center Said's abundance of wealth and luxuries. In "Camera Shy", Said name-drops multiple designer brands such as Prada and Vivienne Westwood. In "Leprosy" and other tracks, Said boasts his sexual prowess.

"Introduction to Act Two", also narrated by Luke Dash, is a transition into the darker tone of the album's second act. It adapts a passage from the 1892 autobiography Life and Times of Frederick Douglass to conflate the constraining effects of alcohol consumption on African American slaves with the intoxicating effects of ambition and fame. Act Two features moodier beats and recenters the music's lyrical themes from Said's triumphs to the pitfalls faced by artists in the music industry. "Critical Acclaim" confronts realities of sexual abuse and predation within the industry; Ghais discussed in an episode of the Rap Music Plug Podcast how high-profile abuse cases, such as the accusations against Sean Combs which came to light the previous year, signal the scope of this problem. Other songs explore gun violence, drug abuse, religion, and the negative consequences associated with sex and seeking romance as a famous artist. Act Two culminates with "Shaitan's Spiderweb", which ends with concluding narration from Dash. An additional track, "You Can Skip This Part", is removed from the album's main narrative device and restates the themes of Said's story to complete the record.

The album adopts multiple structural elements from theatre. In addition to its two-act form and narration segments deriving from the medium, the introduction also takes place in an auditorium, and the final narration in "Shaitan's Spiderweb" reveals that Said had been performing to an audience for the entire album. Guevara has stated that each song can be understood as its own scene. He additionally notes that the album's story is not told chronologically and that its ending is intentionally open-ended.

== Promotion and release ==
Goyard Ibn Said's first single, "Leprosy," was released on September 25, 2024 via Fat Possum Records. It was Guevara's first non-independent release.

"Camera Shy," the album's second single, released on October 29, 2024, accompanied by a music video directed by Rhys Scarabosio. The same day, Guevara officially announced Goyard Ibn Said, its release date, and track listing. Pre-orders for the digital album and a limited 2xLP vinyl release also went live.

On December 4, 2024, Guevara released the album's third single "4L" and announced an upcoming concert in Brooklyn, New York. The fourth single, "The Old Guard Is Dead," dropped on January 3, 2025. "Bystander Effect," the album's final single, released three days before the album on January 21, 2025. The song features rapper Elucid.

Goyard Ibn Said officially released on January 24, 2025.

An instrumental snippet from "The Old Guard Is Dead" was played during the intro and outro of Kendrick Lamar's Super Bowl LIX halftime show performance on February 9, 2025.

== Critical reception ==
Professional ratings
Review scores
Source	Rating
The Line of Best Fit	8/10

Goyard Ibn Said was met with positive coverage from music critics upon release.

Ink 19's Peter Linblad called the album an "auspicious and audacious staging" which was "artfully woven together, with a sharp sense of humor and an ear for diverse, resonant blooms of sounds." Noah Barker of The Line of Best Fit praised the album's "adrenaline-junky beats, acidic comedy, tasteful comedowns," and incisive political commentary.

Grimy Goods' David Sosa wrote of the album's thematic composition: "[it] is anthological in structure, tackling different issues and sharing personal experiences made grand by the songs. Both a concept album and a mirror to reality, it’s clear that Goyard Ibn Said is Guevara giving it his all, using the titular protagonist as a way to explore themes not often discussed in hip-hop or music at large."

Everything Is Noise writer Broc Nelson likened the album's messaging to the writing of French Marxist philosopher Guy Debord.

The album was featured as Bandcamp's "Album of the Day" upon release.

== Track listing ==
All tracks are written by Jaja Gha'is Robinson.

No.	Title	Length
1.	"Introduction to Act 1"	1:29
2.	"The Old Guard Is Dead"	3:04
3.	"Leprosy"	3:25
4.	"3400"	3:22
5.	"I Gazed Upon the Trap with Ambition"	3:59
6.	"Monta Ellis" (featuring Yoko McThuggin)	3:12
7.	"Yamean" (featuring FARO)	3:25
8.	"Camera Shy"	3:06
9.	"Introduction to Act 2"	0:55
10.	"Bystander Effect" (featuring ELUCID)	3:05
11.	"4L"	4:06
12.	"The Apple that Scarcely Fell" (featuring McKinley Dixon)	3:55
13.	"Branded"	3:25
14.	"Critical Acclaim"	3:46
15.	"Shaitan's Spiderweb"	4:42
16.	"You Can Skip this Part"	4:49
Total length:		53:45

== Personnel ==
- Ghais Guevara – writing, production, vocals
- purdyflacks – additional production (on "Monta Ellis")
- LILITH – additional production (on "Monta Ellis")
- DJ Haram – additional production (on "Bystander Effect")
- V – vocals (on "Critical Acclaim")
- Seb Zel – guitar (on "4L")
- Desmond Teague – woodwinds (on "The Apple that Scarcely Fell"), saxophone (on "Shaitan's Spiderweb")
- Annie Elise – strings (on "The Apple that Scarcely Fell")
