= Ziak (rapper) =

French rapper

- Genres: Hip-hop, French rap, Drill music
- Labels: Millenium, Chrome Castle, Universal Music France (depuis 2020)

Ziak Akimbo, known as Ziak (born July 1997), is a French rapper. He distinctively always appears masked and reveals no information regarding his identity. On 12 November 2021 he released his first solo album, Akimbo, certified with a gold disc. Ziak released his second project, Chrome, on 24 February 2023.

== Awards and nominations ==
Award Ceremony	Year	Category	Work	Result	Ref
Berlin Music Video Awards	2022	Best Concept	Akimbo	Nominated	
Berlin Music Video Awards	2023	Best VFX	Même pas un grincement	Won	
Berlin Music Video Awards	2023	Best Director	Talent	Nominated	
Berlin Music Video Awards	2025	Best VFX	Rien ne se remplace	Nominated	
