= Junior King =

South African dancer, rapper and social media personality (1996/1997–2025)

- Born: Dugulth Ferreira; 1996; Gqeberha, Eastern Cape, South Africa
- Died: 11 December 2025 (aged 28–29) Verkeerdevlei, Free State, South Africa
- Occupations: Dancer, rapper, choreographer, social media influencer
- Works: The Revenge Album, Die Getto, Stalaza
- Years active: 2010s–2025

Junior King (born Dugulth Ferreira; 1996 or 1997 – 11 December 2025) was a South African dancer, TikTok personality, rapper and choreographer known for his energetic performances and contributions to Afrikaans hip hop culture. He rose to national fame through social media platforms, where his dance videos and music collaborations garnered wide attention.

== Early life ==
Junior King was born in Gqeberha, Eastern Cape, South Africa. He displayed a passion for dance from a young age and later founded dance groups while mentoring young performers in his community.

== Career ==
Junior King first gained widespread popularity through TikTok and other social media platforms, where his high-energy dance style helped popularise Amapiano choreography. Junior King collaborated with South African musicians and dancers, gradually building a significant online following.

Expanding into music, he became recognised in the Afrikaans hip hop scene, producing hits such as Die Getto, Stalaza, and tracks with Kay Medusa (Kayla Pieters). His 2025 release, The Revenge Album, further elevated his presence in the industry.

Junior King's artistry combined dance, music, and storytelling. His work contributed to the growing popularity of Afrikaans rap, while his public persona inspired youth audiences across South Africa.

== Personal life and death ==
Junior King was a father and often featured aspects of family life in his online presence.

On 11 December 2025, Junior King died in a head-on collision between his vehicle and a light truck on the N1 near Verkeerdevlei in the Free State.Two children travelling with him and another passenger survived with moderate injuries. His death prompted widespread tributes across the South African entertainment community.
