= FearDorian =

American rapper-producer (born 2006)

- FearDorian performing in 2026

Background information
- Born: Dorian Williams; June 13, 2006 (age 20)
- Origin: Atlanta, Georgia, U.S.
- Genres: Hip-hop; jerk
- Occupations: Rapper; songwriter; record producer; DJ
- Years active: 2019–present
- Website: https://www.feardorian.com/

Dorian Williams (born June 13, 2006), professionally known as FearDorian, is an American rapper and record producer from Atlanta, Georgia. He's known for both his production work for other rappers as well as his solo discography. Musicians Williams has produced for include Xaviersobased, D0llywood1 and Na-Kel Smith.

== Early life ==
Williams started making music in 2019, when he was 12 years old.

== Career ==
Williams garnered his first online following by posting videos of him dancing to songs by underground artists on the short-form video app Triller before pivoting to producing his own music. Around that time Williams requested to join New York City hip-hop collective Surf Gang but was denied.

In March 2024 Williams released his self-titled debut album. The sound of FearDorian was described as heavily influenced by a broad range of genres such as "rap, indie rock, and vaporwave" and lyrically preoccupied with adolescence. Williams himself said that his goal was to hit a balance between melancholy and high energy, allowing for songs the listener can sit with as well as dance to. That same year saw the release of multiple collaborative projects such as A Dog's Chance with Surf Gang's Polo Perks and Milwaukee lowend rapper AyooLii followed by Quiet Warp Xpress with RiTchie, the latter giving way to a European and UK tour. A Dog's Chance was especially notable for its sample usage and the unorthodox origins of its samples which included songs by Teen Suicide, Carissa's Wierd, M.I.A., Bladee and Current Joys.

Williams' sophomore full-length album Leaving Home was released January 31, 2025, preceded by short music videos for several of the album's songs shot in the US, UK and Europe mirroring the album's title. The album features returning collaborators such as Quinn, RiTchie, Polo Perks and Klein. Later that same year Williams released Out The Past With A Window.

Following the release of five singles, Before You Press Play, an album with long-time collaborator and Atlanta contemporary Quinn released in early November 2025.

== Discography ==
Studio albums

- 2024 — FearDorian
- 2024 — A Dog's Chance (with Polo Perks and AyooLii)
- 2025 — Leaving Home
- 2025 — Out The Past With A Window
- 2025 — Before You Press Play (with Quinn)
- 2026 — Tease, Vol. 1

EPs

- 2022 — axis (with bronclair)
- 2024 — Quiet Warp Xpress (with RiTchie)
