= Pap Chanel =

American rapper

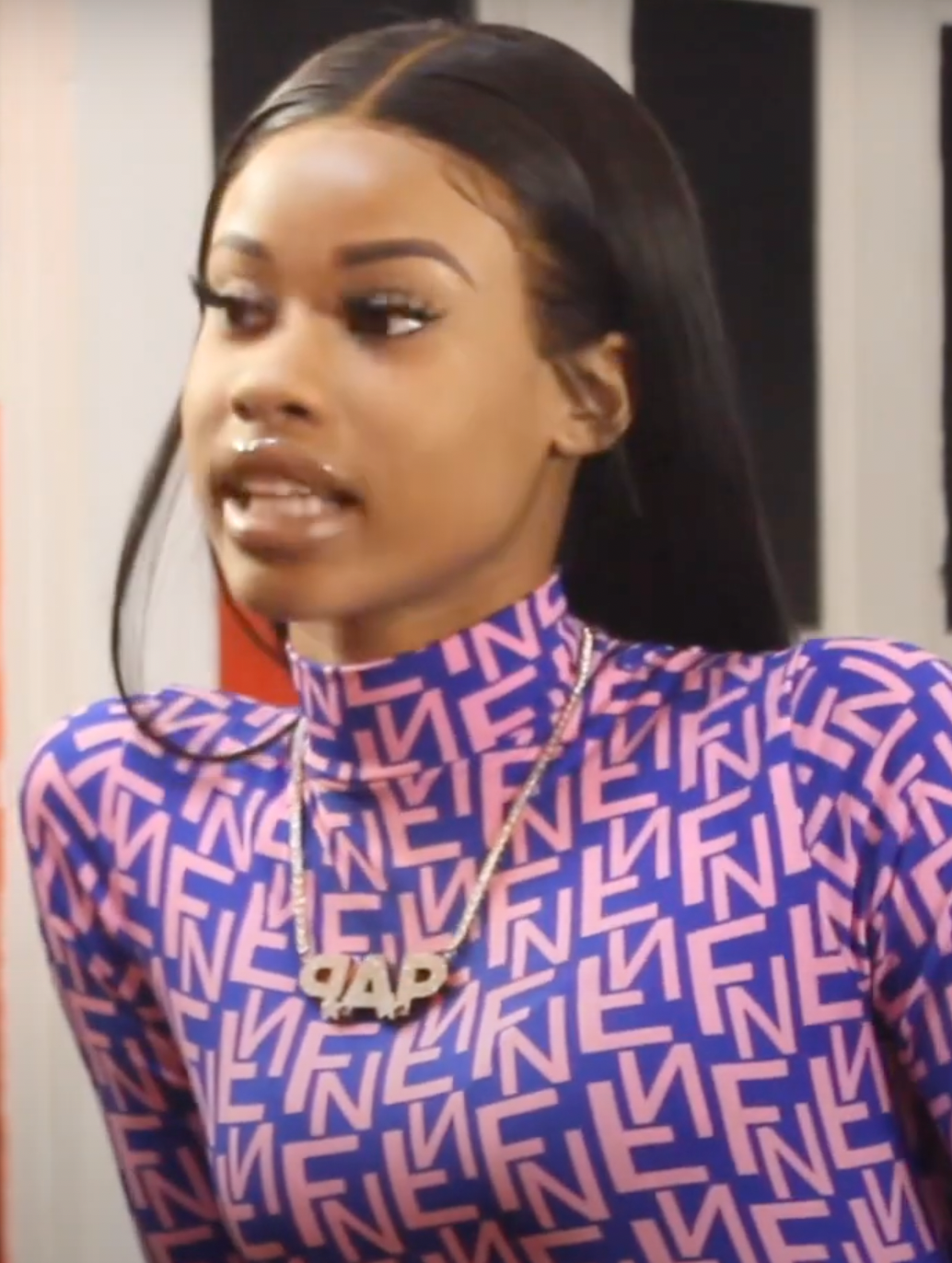
- Pap Chanel in April 2019

Background information
- Born: Jaida Chanel Roby; 1998 or 1999 (age 26–27); Milledgeville, Georgia U.S.
- Origin: Atlanta, Georgia U.S.
- Genres: Hip hop; trap
- Occupations: Rapper; songwriter
- Years active: 2015-present
- Labels: Def Jam; 4th & Broadway; UMG

Jaida Chanel Roby, known professionally as Pap Chanel, is an American rapper from Milledgeville, Georgia who is currently signed to Def Jam Recordings in a joint venture with UMG. She is known for her song "Gucci Bucket Hat" with American rappers Future and Herion Young.

== Career ==
She started rapping alongside her brother between the ages of 8 and 11. In 2015, at the age of 15, she made her first official release, an appearance on American rapper Quan DaKing's single "Add It Up". In 2018, she released her debut project The Definition of P.A.P with appearances from American rapper Lil Baby on tracks "Talk 2 Cheap" and "Freestyle". In 2020, she released her project Pretty & Paid with an appearance from Blac Youngsta on the track "2 Way Street". In July 2022, she released her project Pretty & Paid 2.0, the sequel to her 2020 project. She released her third studio album, The Girl Next Door, on April 29, 2025.

== Musical style ==
She claims Nicki Minaj as her inspiration in rap.
