= Nettspend discography =

- Nettspend in 2024
- Studio albums: 2
- EPs: 2
- Mixtapes: 4
- Singles: 33
- Music videos: 20

American rapper Nettspend has released 1 studio album, 2 extended plays (EPs), 3 mixtapes, 20 music videos, (Note: Music videos were released for the songs "Nothing Like Uuu" and the since-deleted song "That One Song"; following the song's removal, the videos were also taken down.) and 33 singles (including 3 as a featured artist). He began releasing music to SoundCloud in December 2022. He released his breakthrough song, "Drankdrankdrank", in September 2023. Nettspend was briefly affiliated with the digicore collective Novagang. Nearing the end of 2023, he released the song "Shine N Peace", which was listed as one of the best rap songs of 2023 by The Fader and The New York Times. Entering 2024, Nettspend collaborated with rapper Xaviersobased on the song "40"; it was ranked as one of the best songs by The New York Times and Pitchfork. He later collaborated with rapper OsamaSon on the song "Withdrawals". Following those releases, he released "That One Song", which was later removed from streaming platforms due to sampling issues. In October 2024, Nettspend released the single "F*ck Swag", which was his first song to chart, which charted at number 21 on the NZ Hot Singles chart.

Nettspend released his debut studio mixtape, Bad Ass F*cking Kid, in December 2024. It was his first entry on the Billboard 200, debuting at number 197. Nettspend released a two-track EP titled Gone Too Soon in August 2025. He released his debut studio album, titled Early Life Crisis, in March 2026. It debuted at number 39 on the Billboard 200. On April 30, 2026, Nettspend released a compilation album titled Him. He released the EP Virginia Creeper in October 2026.

== Albums ==
=== Studio albums ===
List of studio albums, with year released and selected details, showing selected chart positions
Title	Details	Peak chart positions		
Title	Details	US	US R&B/HH	CAN
Early Life Crisis	Released: March 6, 2026; Label: Grade A, Interscope; Format: CD, digital download, streaming	39	13	100
Slut	Scheduled: 2027; Label: Interscope; Format: CD, digital download, streaming	—	—	—

=== Compilation albums ===
List of compilation albums, with year released and selected details
Title	Details
Him	Released: April 30, 2026; Label: Grade A, Interscope; Formats: CD, digital download, streaming

== Mixtapes ==
List of mixtapes, with year released and selected details, showing selected chart positions
Title	Details	Peak chart positions	
Title	Details	US	US Heat.
Kickdoor (Note: While Kickdoor is considered to be an official mixtape, Nettspend has stated that he does not classify it as such.)	Released: May 26, 2023 (initial) June 8, 2023 (deluxe); Label: Self-released; Format: Streaming	—	—
Bad Ass F*cking Kid	Released: December 6, 2024; Label: Grade A, Interscope; Format: CD, digital download, streaming	197	2
Him	Released: July 1, 2026 (Note: Him was exclusively released on SoundCloud on May 1, but was later re-released to other platforms.); Label: Grade A, Interscope; Format: Streaming	—	—
NXO (with OsamaSon)	Scheduled: 2026; Label: Interscope; Format: Digital download, streaming	—	—
"—" denotes a recording that did not chart or was not released in that territory.

== Extended plays ==
List of extended plays, with year released and selected details
Title	Details
Gone Too Soon	Released: August 22, 2025; Label: Grade A, Interscope; Format: Digital download, streaming
Virginia Creeper	Released: October 30, 2026; Label: Interscope; Format: Digital download, streaming

== Singles ==
List of singles, with selected chart positions, showing year released and album name
Title	Year	Peak chart positions	Album
Title	Year	NZ Hot	Album
"What They Say"	2023	—	Non-album singles
"On Me" (featuring Yhapojj)	2023	—	Non-album singles
"Good Night"	2023	—	Non-album singles
"Beamerrr"	2023	—	Non-album singles
"Cryptonite"	2023	—	Non-album singles
"Gen 5 (DJ Phatt Exclusive)"	2023	—	Kickdoor
"Section"	2023	—	Non-album singles
"U Gon Fall"	2023	—	Non-album singles
"U Told Us Quit" (featuring Yungster Jack)	2023	—	Kickdoor
"Hollywood"	2023	—	Non-album singles
"Where the Racks At" (featuring Zootzie)	2023	—	Non-album singles
"Funuhyuh"	2023	—	Non-album singles
"Take You Out"	2023	—	Non-album singles
"Shine N Peace"	2023	—	Non-album singles
"We Not Like You"	2023	—	Non-album singles
"Packs" (featuring Duwap Kaine)	2023	—	Non-album singles
"Yooo"	2023	—	Non-album singles
"Benihana"	2023	—	Non-album singles
"OTW" (featuring Xaviersobased)	2023	—	Non-album singles
"Feeliinuu"	2023	—	Non-album singles
"Drankdrankdrank"	2023	—	Non-album singles
"Wake Up" (featuring OsamaSon)	2023	—	Non-album singles
"Model Sex"	2023	—	Non-album singles
"2024 Freestyle"	2023	—	Non-album singles
"40" (with Evilgiane and Xaviersobased)	2024	—	#HeavensGate Vol. 1
"Nothing Like Uuu"	2024	—	Non-album singles
"Withdrawals" (with OsamaSon)	2024	—	Non-album singles
"That One Song"	2024	—	Non-album singles
"F*ck Swag"	2024	21	Non-album singles
"Impact" (with Xaviersobased)	2025	—	Non-album singles
"Sober"	2026	—	Slut
"KickAss (Pull Up Pls)" (with Che)	2026	—	Slut
"—" denotes a recording that did not chart or was not released in that territory.

== Other charted songs ==
List of other charting songs, with selected chart positions, showing year released and album name
Title	Year	Peak chart positions	Album
Title	Year	NZ Hot	Album
"Shut Up"	2024	31	Bad Ass F*cking Kid
"Skipping Class"	2024	30	Bad Ass F*cking Kid
"Gen Z Leak"	2024	32	Bad Ass F*cking Kid
"You Ready?"	2026	26	Early Life Crisis

== Guest appearances ==
List of non-single guest appearances, with other performing artists, showing year released and album name
Title	Year	Other performer(s)	Album
"Drum Roll"	2023	Kasper Gem	Non-album single
"40"	2024	Evilgiane, Xaviersobased	#HeavensGate Vol. 1
"This Far"	2024	Xaviersobased	Keep It Goin Xav

== Music videos ==
List of music videos, showing year released and director
Title	Year	Director(s)
"U Gon Fall"	2023	6ixvcr
"2024 Freestyle"	2023	Sagewvlf
"DrankDrankDrank"	2023	Tycho (The Toxic Lifestyle)
"Wake Up" (with OsamaSon)	2023	Tycho
"We Not Like You"	2023	Tycho
"Hopscotch" (Note: While "Hopscotch" was officially released onto YouTube as a music video, it has not been officially released to streaming platforms.)	2024	Unknown
"F*ck Swag"	2024	Cole Bennett
"Tommy"	2025	Sophia Lipatova
"Impact"	2025	Unknown
"Shut Up"	2025	Unknown
"Stressed"	2025	Hidjifilms
"Who Tf Is U"	2026	Kai Cranmore
"Masked Up"	2026	Cian Moore
"Sober"	2026	Unknown
