= OsamaSon discography =

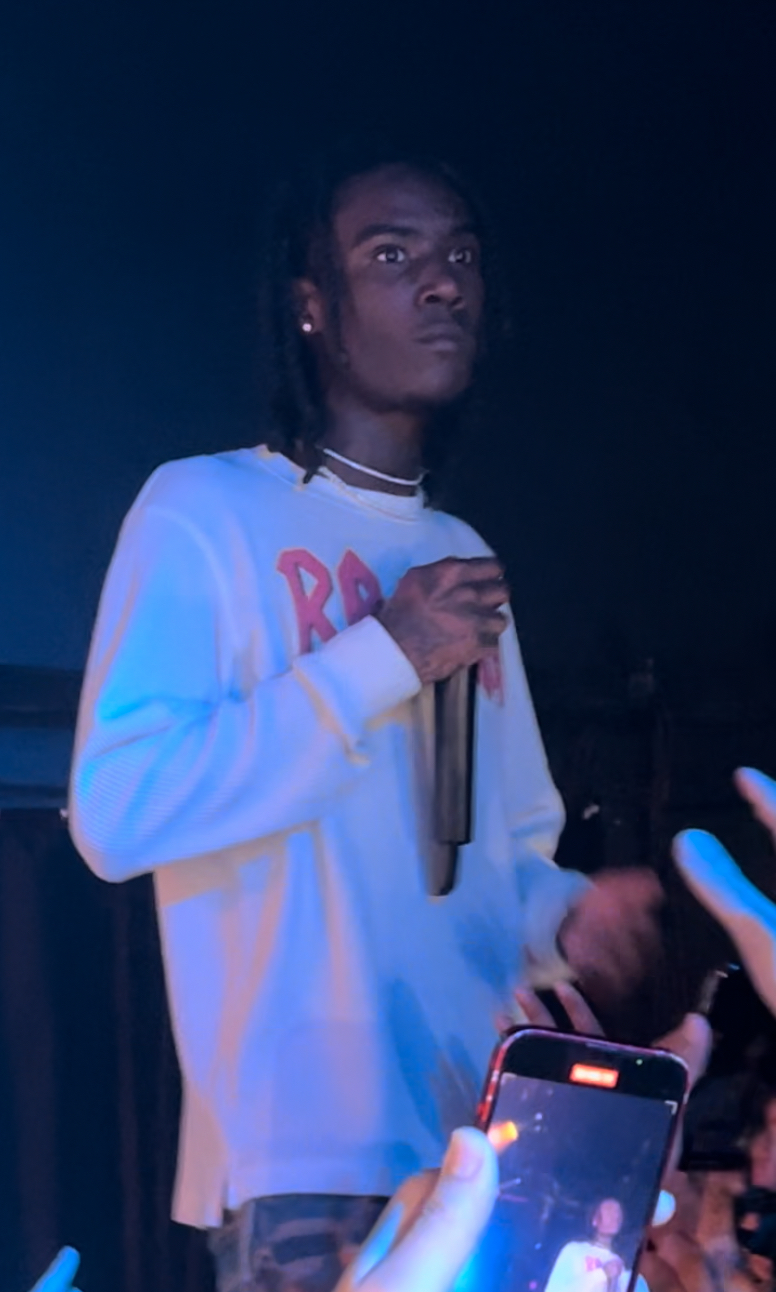
- Studio albums: 4
- EPs: 6
- Mixtapes: 1
- Singles: 26
- Collaborative studio albums: 1

The discography of American rapper OsamaSon consists of four studio albums, two EPs, two mixtapes, and 26 singles. OsamaSon began his music career at a young age after his Geechee uncle taught him how to produce music on FL Studio. Following his newfound skill, OsamaSon went by the moniker Damn 4K and began producing instrumentals influenced by musicians such as Chief Keef, NLE Choppa, Summrs, and Kankan.

However, OsamaSon began making music in 2020 under the name PradaUMari. By 2021, he adopted his current stage name and released the mixtapes Vengeance and Carnival. In early 2023, the collaborative projects Osamavrt and 2 Slime preceded the release of the EP Bad Habits. On April 7, OsamaSon's breakout single, "Cts-V", was released and began gaining traction online. His music was further popularized by Internet personalities such as BruceDropEmOff, who played OsamaSon's songs on his live streams. On June 2, 2023, OsamaSon released "Troops", the lead single from his debut mixtape, Osama Season; like "Cts-V". Osama Season itself was released on July 21, with music critics for Pitchfork and the Fader highlighting the tracks "Werkin", "Kutta", "Summer Sixteen", "Anti", and "X & Sex" as standouts from the album.

On February 16, 2024, OsamaSon released Flxtra, the six track deluxe edition of Flex Musix. In January 24, 2025, OsamaSon released his third studio album, Jump Out, to critical acclaim from publications like Pitchfork. A deluxe version of Jump Out featuring two extra songs was released 4 days later on the 28th, and the album was his first to chart on the Billboard 200, peaking at number 151 on February 8. On October 10, 2025, OsamaSon would release his second studio album of the year, titled Psykotic, which would have 17 tracks and a guest appearance from American rapper Che. Upon release, the album - like its predecessor - generated lukewarm to positive reviews. Now, as of 2026, OsamaSon is gearing up for his following release, Nocturnal, and NXO with Nettspend.

== Studio albums ==
Title	Details	Peak chart positions	
Title	Details	US	US R&B/HH
Flex Musix	Released: December 8, 2023; Labels: Motion, Atlantic; Format: CD, digital download, streaming	—	—
Jump Out	Released: January 24, 2025; Labels: Motion, Atlantic; Format: LP, CD, digital download, streaming	151	—
Psykotic	Released: October 10, 2025; Labels: Motion, Atlantic; Format: Digital download, streaming	81	20
Nocturnal	Scheduled: November 27, 2026; Labels: Motion, Atlantic; Format: Digital download, streaming	TBA	

== Collaborative studio albums ==
Title	Details	Peak chart positions
Title	Details	US
NXO (with Nettspend)	Scheduled: 2026; Labels: Grade A, Interscope; Format: Digital download, streaming	–

== Mixtapes ==
Title	Details
Osama Season	Released: July 21, 2023; Labels: Self-released; Format: Cassette, digital download, streaming

== EPs ==
Title	Details
2 Slime (with Boolymon)	Released: March 17, 2023; Labels: Self-released; Format: Digital download, streaming
Ohsama (with Ohsxnta)	Released: March 27, 2023; Labels: Self-released; Format: Digital download, streaming
Still Slime (with Boolymon)	Released: March 12, 2024; Labels: Self-released; Format: Digital download, streaming
3vil Reflection (with Glokk40Spaz)	Released: May 24, 2024; Labels: Columbia Records; Format: Digital download, streaming
BasedSlime (with Xaviersobased) (Note: The EP was uploaded exclusively on SoundCloud.)	Released: April 27, 2025; Labels: Atlantic Records, 1c34; Format: Digital download, streaming
Grails (Note: Originally uploaded to music streaming services by hackers, the tape was removed through OsamaSon's label and was officially re-uploaded online on May 21, 2025)	Released: May 21, 2025; Labels: Columbia Records; Format: Digital download, streaming

== Singles ==
Title	Year	Album
"High as Shit"	2022	Non-album singles
"MeVsWorld"	2022	Non-album singles
"Girl of My Dreams"	2022	Non-album singles
"GoToHell"	2022	Non-album singles
"Tony"	2022	Non-album singles
"Rehab"	2022	Non-album singles
"Jugg in My Sleep"	2022	Non-album singles
"Defeat"	2022	Non-album singles
"Catch Em"	2022	Non-album singles
"FrontRow"	2022	Non-album singles
"In Dat Cut"	2022	Non-album singles
"Garfield"	2022	Non-album singles
"Back From Dead"	2023	Non-album singles
"Draco" (featuring Ohsxnta)	2023	Non-album singles
"Slime Krew" (featuring Wildkarduno & Smokingskul)	2023	Non-album singles
"CTS-V"	2023	Non-album singles
"Troops"	2023	Osama Season
"Balanci Thot" (with Jaydes)	2023	Non-album single
"Trenches"	2023	Flex Musix
"Withdrawals" (with Nettspend)	2024	Non-album singles
"Popstar"	2024	Non-album singles
"IK What You Did Last Summer"	2024	Non-album singles
"Just Score It"	2024	Non-album singles
"The Whole World Is Free"	2024	Jump Out
"Demon Home"	2025	Non-album single
"Off That!"	2026	Nocturnal
