= Pain Talk (song) =

2026 song by Nettspend featuring OsamaSon

Song by Nettspend featuring OsamaSon

from the album Early Life Crisis
- Released: March 6, 2026
- Genre: Rage rap
- Length: 2:49
- Label: Grade A · Interscope
- Songwriters: Gunner Shepardson; Amari Middleton; Johnny Peng; Warren Hunter; Rok Curkovic; Kenechukwu Prosper Iloh
- Producers: Skai; Warren Hunter; Rok; Gyro

Music video
- "Pain Talk" on YouTube

"Pain Talk" (stylized in lowercase) is a song by American rapper Nettspend featuring American rapper OsamaSon, from Nettspend's debut studio album, Early Life Crisis (2026). Released on March 6, 2026, as the album's third track, the song was written by Nettspend and OsamaSon and its producers, Skai, Warren Hunter, Rok, and Gyro. Prior to the album's release, OsamaSon, alongside YoungBoy Never Broke Again were reported as the two guest appearances on the album.

"Pain Talk" is a rage song characterized by its churning production that consists of distorted waves of bass from Skai, Warren Hunter, Rok, and Gyro. Lyrically, the track sees the duo of Nettspend and OsamaSon trade verses about their recreational drug use and using drugs as a form of coping with pain. Upon release, reviews for "Pain Talk" were mixed.

== Background and release ==
American rappers Nettspend and OsamaSon first met in 2023 through the underground rap scene. They released their first joint track together, titled "Wake Up", on September 13, 2023. In June 2024, the two collaborated again to release their track "Withdrawals", which received critical acclaim from music journalists and fans within the rage community. In October 2024, following the release of his single "IK What You Did Last Summer", OsamaSon began working on his album Jump Out, and had plans of adding Nettspend on it. However, the plan failed, as according to OsamaSon, Nettspend "fell asleep in the studio" during recording sessions.

Weeks before the album's release, Nettspend promoted it through a "damage control hotline"—1-804-ELC-6246—which promised fans "daily check-ins" in the run-up to March 6, 2026. Additionally, ahead the album's release, it was reported by Vivian Medithi of The Fader that rappers YoungBoy Never Broke Again and OsamaSon were the album's rumored guest appearances. On March 6, 2026, Grade A and Interscope Records released Early Life Crisis, "Pain Talk", the album's third track, was one of the two collaborations that were included on the album like it was reported, with the other being "Masked Up" with YoungBoy Never Broke Again.

== Composition and lyricism ==
"Pain Talk" is a rage song that comes in at a runtime of two minutes and 49 seconds. Nettspend and OsamaSon co-wrote the song with Skai, Warren Hunter, Rok, Gyro, and CXO, where the latter handled the mixing, and mastering of the track. The track is characterized by its "churning production", which is layered by distorted waves of bass, a technique that Nettspend uses frequently. The staff from AllMusic called "Pain Talk" as a scrambled track while Jeff Ihaza of Rolling Stone wrote how the track sees the duo getting "lost in the mayhem". According to Hattie Lindert of Pitchfork, Nettspend sounds the opposite of her companion, writing how he fails to "out-Carti"'s style and energy on the track.

Lyrically, track features frequent refrains from Nettspend revolving around the theme of the song, where Nettspend raps: "Poppin’ pink, but still in pain, Poppin’ pink, that's for the pain". His delivery on the track was described as "stuttered and nasal" by Alexandria Elise and sees Nettspend frequently loop the word "pain" until the word "has lost all meaning". On his verse, Elise wrote how OsamaSon hits "harder bar-for-bar". According to Elise, the track sees the duo rap about using recreational drugs as a coping mechanism to deal with the pain that they struggle through.

== Critical reception ==
Upon release, reviews for the track were mixed to positive. Lindert of Pitchfork called it the "low point" of Early Life Crisis, writing that Nettspend fails to mimic the style of his influence Playboi Carti, and how OsamaSon fails to be a better pairing than YoungBoy on their track "Masked Up". In a more favorable review, Elise of Shatter The Standards wrote how the OsamaSon's verse, Nettspend's vocal delivery, and the duo's chemistry on the track made "Pain Talk" an enjoyable listen for her.

== Credits and personnel ==
Credits adapted from Apple Music.

- Gunner Shepardson - vocals, songwriter
- Amari Middleton - vocals, songwriter
- Johnny Peng - production, songwriter
- Warren Hunter - production, songwriter
- Rok Curkovic - production, songwriter
- Kenechukwu Prosper Iloh - production, songwriter
- Nathaniel Campos - mixing, mastering
- Dustin Richardson – immersive mixing engineer

== Release history ==
Release history for "Pain Talk"
Region	Date	Format(s)	Label(s)	Ref.
Various	March 6, 2026	Digital download · streaming · CD	Grade A · Interscope	
