= Masked Up =

2026 song by Nettspend featuring YoungBoy Never Broke Again

Song by Nettspend featuring YoungBoy Never Broke Again

from the album Early Life Crisis
- Released: March 6, 2026
- Genre: Rage rap
- Length: 2:16
- Label: Grade A · Interscope
- Songwriters: Gunner Shepardson; Kentrell DeSean Gaulden; Nathaniel Campos
- Producer: CXO

Music video
- "Masked Up" on YouTube

"Masked Up" (stylized in all lowercase) is a song by American rapper Nettspend featuring fellow American rapper YoungBoy Never Broke Again, from Nettspend's debut studio album, Early Life Crisis (2026). Released as the album's eighth track on March 6, 2026, through Grade A and Interscope, the song was written by Nettspend, YoungBoy, and its producer CXO. YoungBoy was reported as a guest on the album before its release.

Musically, "Masked Up" is a rage rap song driven by heavy 808s, distorted waves of bass, and siren-like synths; Nettspend raps in short, staccato bursts before and after a single verse from YoungBoy, who raps slower and more deliberately. The lyrics consist almost entirely of boasts about money, clothes, and travel.

Reviews for Early Life Crisis were mixed, though "Masked Up" was regarded as one of the album's best tracks by music journalists—who mainly credited YoungBoy's flow—while a Rolling Stone critic found Nettspend's delivery the weaker half of the pairing. "Masked Up" was ranked eighth on XXL's list of YoungBoy's features from that year. An accompanying music video filmed in Utah features lo-fi, nighttime footage of Nettspend and YoungBoy, while cars drift in a parking lot, and was well received by The Fader.

== Background and release ==
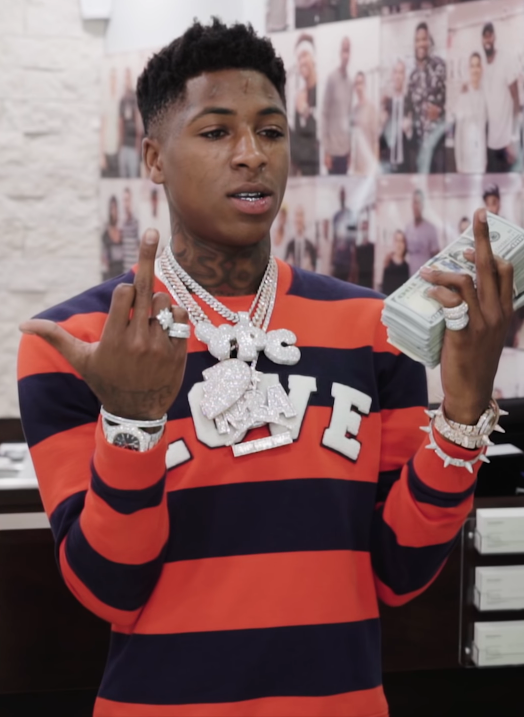
YoungBoy Never Broke Again (pictured in 2018) recorded the song's lone guest verse.

Nettspend, who is from Richmond, Virginia, achieved traction through a run of mixtapes and EPs, including the 2024 mixtape Bad Ass F*cking Kid, and gained wider recognition in the underground rap scene through 2024 with the viral singles "That One Song" and "F*ck Swag". He signed with Interscope Records later that year. He was 18 when Early Life Crisis (2026) was released and turned 19 within weeks of its release. The album came after a prolonged rollout that Pitchfork's Hattie Lindert described as "prone to leaks and sandbagged by indecision", with "five to seven false starts"; in the weeks before release, Nettspend promoted it through a "damage control hotline"—1-804-ELC-6246—which promised fans "daily check-ins" in the run-up to March 6.

Ahead of the album's release, The Fader's Vivian Medithi reported that YoungBoy Never Broke Again and OsamaSon were its rumored guests. OsamaSon told her that Nettspend had been supposed to feature on his album Jump Out but fell asleep in the studio; the two had previously collaborated on 2024's "Withdrawals". At the time of its release, The New York Times's Jon Caramanica called YoungBoy "really the biggest rapper in America right now".

Grade A and Interscope released Early Life Crisis on March 6, 2026. "Masked Up", the album's eighth track, is one of its two collaborations—the other being the OsamaSon-featuring "Pain Talk". The song was also included in weekly new-music roundups by the Estonian broadcaster ERR—published on March 6, the day the album came out—and by Vibe, whose column ran on March 13, a week later.

== Composition ==
"Masked Up"
A 12-second sample of the song: Nettspend opens with a short, staccato delivery before the track switches to a single verse from YoungBoy Never Broke Again.

"Masked Up" is a rage rap track that lasts for two minutes and 16 seconds. It was written by Nettspend (Gunner Shepardson), YoungBoy Never Broke Again (Kentrell DeSean Gaulden), and CXO (Nathaniel Campos), who also produced, mixed, and mastered it. The Fader has described CXO as one of Che's core producers. The track's fast tempo carries heavy 808s and "redlining" drums. Vivian Medithi of The Fader likened the bass to "a herd of noxious 808s that stampede in like wild horses". Christopher Gonda of V13 Media depicted the production as "a wild swirl of distorted bass waves, siren-like synths", naming the track one of the most "blisteringly intense cuts" on the 21-song album. Jeff Ihaza of Rolling Stone placed the song within the maximalist rage style that had spread through the online underground, which he considered "a predictable shorthand for overtures to a younger audience".

Nettspend raps before and after a single verse from YoungBoy. Gonda described the lyrics as an "almost abstract whirlwind of flexes" about cash, clothes, and travel. Nettspend's delivery comes in short bursts full of tension, which Jon Caramanica of The New York Times characterized as "short chirps". YoungBoy, by contrast, raps slower and more deliberately, in a flow Caramanica likened to Rakim's. Elijah Pareño of Rolling Stone Philippines found that YoungBoy's flow held the song together while Nettspend's delivery carried the angst.

== Critical reception ==
Ihaza called YoungBoy's verse the album's "most compelling and straightforward", and observed how his Southern flow glided over the song's tempo. Hattie Lindert of Pitchfork, who panned the album, wrote that YoungBoy made for a better pairing on the track than OsamaSon had on "Pain Talk". Medithi described the collaboration as "not quite a torch-passing moment", while Ihaza wrote that next to YoungBoy, Nettspend's "weakness as a rapper is hard to ignore", calling him "still kind of distant as a narrator".

Caramanica said historians would look back on the song as "something of a watershed moment". He argued that YoungBoy's presence on the album showed Nettspend was "deep down" still "a badass kid". In a less favorable review, Anthony Fantano stated that YoungBoy's verse sounds like he planned out and practiced his feature for months. In April 2026, XXL ranked "Masked Up" eighth in its list of YoungBoy's features from that year. In August 2026, Complex included Early Life Crisis among the best rap albums of the year to date; Dimas Sanfiorenzo cited "Masked Up" as one of the album's signs of "greatness and uniqueness".

== Music video ==
YoungBoy Never Broke Again (left) and Nettspend (right) sitting in front of a car in the "Masked Up" music video, filmed at night in a Utah parking lot.

The music video for "Masked Up" premiered on March 11, 2026, on YouTube. It consists of lo-fi nighttime footage of Nettspend and YoungBoy as cars drift around a parking lot. Per a press release, the video was filmed in Utah, which the press release described as YoungBoy's adopted home state. Derrick Rossignol of Uproxx wrote that the pair "vibe at night" as the cars drift, and Medithi described the video as "simple but effective", writing that the pair "mean mug while cars do donuts in the background". Gonda noted that the two dance, smoke, and toss a detached car bumper into the air while showing off their jewelry and a Gucci belt worn by Nettspend. According to Gonda, "Masked Up" followed the video for "Who TF Is U", which was filmed in Nettspend's home state of Virginia.

== Credits and personnel ==
Credits adapted from Apple Music.

- Gunner Shepardson – vocals, songwriter, engineer
- Kentrell DeSean Gaulden – vocals, songwriter
- Nathaniel Campos (CXO) – producer, songwriter, mixing engineer, mastering engineer
- Dustin Richardson – immersive mixing engineer

== Release history ==
Release history for "Masked Up"
Region	Date	Format(s)	Label(s)	Ref.
Various	March 6, 2026	Digital download · streaming · CD	Grade A · Interscope	
