= F*ck Swag =

2024 single by Nettspend

Single by Nettspend
- Released: October 3, 2024
- Recorded: 2024
- Genre: Trap
- Length: 2:01
- Label: Grade A Productions; Interscope Records
- Songwriters: Gunner Sheppardson; Anthony Kilhoffer; William Dale Minnix III; Anand Joshi
- Producer: OK

Nettspend singles chronology
"Withdrawals" (2024)	"F*ck Swag" (2024)	"Impact" (2025)

Music video
- "F*ck Swag" on YouTube

"F*ck Swag" (stylized in all caps) is a song recorded by American artist Nettspend. It was released on October 3, 2024, through Grade A Productions and Interscope Records as a promotional single for his debut mixtape, Bad Ass F*cking Kid. Nettspend wrote it along with Anthony Kilhoffer, William Dale Minnix III, and Anand Joshi.

"F*ck Swag" is a hip-hop song characterized by its trippy, distorted production, AutoTune, digitalized vocals, and catchy melodies. The song peaked at number 21 on the NZ Hot 40 charts, marking Nettspend's first charting on any music chart. An accompanying music video, directed by Cole Bennett, was released a day before the song's official release.

== Background, release, and music video ==
The existence of "F*ck Swag" dates back to July 14, 2024, when the producer of the track, OK, went on an Instagram Live to preview the track. On June 26, Nettspend teamed up with close collaborator OsamaSon to release their track, dubbed "Withdrawals" (stylized in lower case). On September 7, 2024, following the track's release, Nettspend made his debut appearance at the 2024 Warsaw Clout Festival, where he previewed a longer snippet of the track. Before previewing it, he said:

I just wanna show y'all something just 'cause I've been going through something recently. I just wanna show y'all something new.

On October 3, 2024, a month after the track's preview, Nettspend officially released "F*ck Swag" onto streaming platforms. A music video for the track, directed by Cole Bennett, was released a day prior. The music video features a small wooden room empty stage with nothing but a chandelier hanging, and water pouring from the top. Bennett used Arri LF, Sony FX3, and Phantom cameras on Canon K35 and Laowa Probe lenses. Additionally, Bennett released a behind the scenes video for the creation of the music video.

== Composition and lyrics ==
"F*ck Swag" runs for two minutes and one second. Nettspend co-wrote the song with Anthony Kilhoffer, Anand Joshi, and William Dale Minnix III, who produced it; Kilhoffer handled mixing and engineering, whilst Anand Joshi handled mastering. Alexander Cole of HotNewHipHop wrote that the song sounds incomprehensible because of heavy Auto-Tune, distortion, and effects. According to HipHopCanada, "F*ck Swag" sees Nettspend be "blessed with a brightly distorted beat; the track finds the rising star leaning into his own legend with his signature woozy, digitized flow." On the track, he shouts out Poland, where he was a month before the track's release; he raps, "Yeah, I went to Poland, do you still think that I'm jokin'? / Yeah, ain't no Wock' in Poland, but we got some poles in."

Additionally, the staff of HipHopCanada wrote how OK's production "sounds like drums rattling out of broken speaker cones, keys that feel equally warped and uplifting, and an earthquake's worth of bass rumbling underfoot." Taye Rowland-Dixon of Verge Magazine wrote how "F*ck Swag's" "beat's gritty yet infectious bounce", paired with his signature vocals, can easily capture the attention of listeners. According to Jon Barlas of Complex, he wrote how Nettspend "delivers dizzying melodies and bass-heavy, distorted soundscapes, expertly curated by his go-to producer, ok." Bree Castillo of Flaunt wrote how the track features "heavily rounded swaggy 808 basslines".

== Commercial performance and reception ==
"F*ck Swag" made its chart debut in New Zealand, with the track peaking at number 21 on the NZ Top 40 chart, it marked as Nettspend's first ever song to chart in any territory.. Additionally, Complex ranked "F*ck Swag" at number 50 on their "The 50 Best Songs of 2024".

== Charts ==
Weekly chart performance for "F*ck Swag"
Chart (2024)	Peak position
New Zealand Hot Singles (RMNZ)	21
