= Who TF Is U =

2026 song by Nettspend

Song by Nettspend

from the album Early Life Crisis
- Released: March 6, 2026
- Genre: Trap; rage
- Length: 2:01
- Label: Grade A Productions; Interscope
- Songwriters: Gunner Sheppardson; Nathaniel Campos
- Producer: CXO

Music video
- "Who TF Is U" on YouTube

"Who TF Is U" (stylized in all lowercase) is a song by American rapper Nettspend, released on March 6, 2026, from his debut studio album Early Life Crisis. Released as the sixth track on the album on March 6, 2026, through Grade A Productions and Interscope, the song was written by Nettspend and CXO, who helped produce the track.

"Who TF Is U" is a trap and rage song which is characterized by its "raging 808s", Drake-esque cadence flows, bit crushed drums and impish lyricism. A music video for the track was released three days later, on March 9, 2026, which sees Nettspend in his home state of Virginia live a freewheeling lifestyle of "teenage mayhem". Upon release, reviews for "Who TF Is U" were mixed to positive, with Vivian Medithi of The Fader calling it the standout track off the album while Hattie Lindert of Pitchfork called it difficult and uncomfortable for listeners to enjoy.

== Background ==
Nettspend, who is from Richmond, Virginia, achieved traction through a run of mixtapes and EPs, including the 2024 mixtape Bad Ass F*cking Kid, and gained wider recognition in the underground rap scene through 2024 with the viral singles "That One Song" and "F*ck Swag". He signed with Interscope Records later that year. He was 18 when Early Life Crisis issued and turned 19 within weeks of its release. The album came after a prolonged rollout that Pitchfork's Hattie Lindert described as "prone to leaks and sandbagged by indecision", with "five to seven false starts"; in the weeks before release, Nettspend promoted it through a "damage control hotline"—1-804-ELC-6246—which promised fans "daily check-ins" in the run-up to March 6.

== Composition ==
"Who Tf Is U" runs for two minutes and one second. The track was written by Nettspend and CXO, who did the mastering and mixing. Davy Reed of The Face wrote that Nettspend's rap flows sprayed across the beat reminds Reed of Jackson Pollock. He also wrote that the track sees Nettspend rap about zodiac love and catfishing paired with "hostile yelps" over "brutal bass bombs and panic alarm synths." Vivian Medithi of The Fader writes how the track is the "album's centerpiece", writing how Nettspend brags about how he "don't eat no catfish" and his "baby mama batshit". The latter phrase stands out amid Nettspend's constant use of "slime" and other trap-music signifiers. The track also flips the cadence of Drake off of his track "Hotline Bling".

Hattie Lindert of Pitchfork was negatively critical of the track, writing that Nettspend pushes things too far with shocking and extreme lyrics, making the song uncomfortable or difficult for some listeners to enjoy. Jeff Ihaza of Rolling Stone wrote that Nettspend can "wrangle a compelling cadence out of the sonic chaos", while the raging distorted 808s serve as a cushion for Nettspend's vocals to land on. A reviewer for New Wave Magazine wrote that the track sees Nettspend exude "restless energy", as the track sees him "thrive on confrontation." According to a writer for Universal Music Canada, the writer wrote how the track features "Bit-crushed drum explosions and glittering splats of melody roil" underneath Nettspend's voice which both blends with and pierces through the "burbling digital chaos".

== Music video ==
Image of Nettspend in the music video; the video depicts his "brash" and "free living" lifestyle.

Three days after the album's release, a music video for "Who TF Is U" was released on YouTube and features creative direction from Kai Cranmore, who also directs music videos for RJ Pasin and OsamaSon. The music video was filmed in Nettspend's home state of Virginia. The music video "embodies" the brazen spirit of Early Life Crisis, featuring Nettspend's "freewheeling teenage mayhem". The video features friend corpses and female companionship, with the group shooting fireworks, throwing snowballs, doing donuts, setting fires, and obliterate mailboxes with a spiked bat from the bed of a pickup truck.

== Credits and personnel ==
Credits are adapted from Apple Music.

- Gunner Shepardson – vocals, songwriter, recording engineer
- Nathaniel Campos (CXO) – producer, songwriter, mixing engineer, mastering engineer
- Dustin Richardson – immersive mixing engineer

== Release history ==
Release history for "Who TF Is U"
Region	Date	Format(s)	Label(s)	Ref.
Various	March 6, 2026	Digital download · streaming · CD	Grade A · Interscope	
