= IK What You Did Last Summer =

2024 single by OsamaSon

Single by OsamaSon
- Released: October 2, 2024
- Genre: Rage; trap
- Length: 1:46
- Label: Atlantic
- Songwriters: Amari Adham Middleton; William Dale Minnix III
- Producer: Ok

OsamaSon singles chronology
"Poster" (2023)	"IK What You Did Last Summer" (2024)	"Just Score It" (2024)

Music video
- "IK What You Did Last Summer" on YouTube

"IK What You Did Last Summer" (stylized in all lowercase, expanded "I Know What You Did Last Summer", abbreviated as "IKWYDLS") is a single by American rapper OsamaSon, released on October 2, 2024, through Atlantic Records.

== Background and composition ==
The single was produced by OsamaSon's frequent collaborator Ok, who had previewed one version of the track as early as June 14, 2024, prior to its official release. According to HotNewHipHop, "IK What You Did Last Summer" uses the same beat as "California" by fellow rapper Nettspend, a frequent collaborator of OsamaSon's, and the song includes a shoutout to Nettspend in its lyrics. At the time of its release, unreviewed annotations on Genius speculated that OsamaSon was working on a project referred to as jumpout, reported to be his third mixtape.

Complex writer Antonio Johri, in a retrospective on rage rap, credited production to Wegonebeok (a.k.a. Ok) and described the beat as featuring a "chiptune-inspired" loop running frenetically beneath a distorted bassline, over which OsamaSon delivers "thin, monotone vocals."

== Reception ==
According to HotNewHipHop, the single became OsamaSon's biggest track of 2024 up to that point, surpassing two million streams within weeks of its release.

Complex included the song at number 15 on its list of the 15 best rage rap songs of all time, with Johri writing that OsamaSon has "carved out a lane for himself by pushing the boundaries of minimalistic lyricism and maximizing bass-heavy production."

Verge Magazine ranked "Ik What You Did Last Summer" third on its list of the top 10 OsamaSon songs, writing that it blends nostalgic lyricism with aggressive rage rap production, positioning it as both a "danceable ear-worm" and a memorable anthem. The magazine noted OsamaSon himself had described the song as making listeners feel alive and moving, and that it consistently ranks among his most-played songs on streaming platforms.

HotNewHipHop later described the song as being part of a string of buzzworthy 2024 singles, alongside "Withdrawals" and "popstar," released while OsamaSon prepared his anticipated Jump Out mixtape. The song was also mentioned in coverage of OsamaSon's first headlining tour of Australia, announced for October 2026, as one of the tracks for which he is known.

== Credits and personnel ==
Credits attributed from HotNewHipHop, and Apple Music.

- OsamaSon – vocals, songwriting
- William Dale "Ok" Minnix III – songwriting, production
