= Nocturnal (OsamaSon album) =

Studio album by OsamaSon
- Released: November 27, 2026

OsamaSon chronology
Psykotic (2025)	Nocturnal (2026)	NXO (2027)

Singles from Nocturnal
- 1. "Off That!" Released: May 20, 2026

Nocturnal is the upcoming fourth studio album by American rapper OsamaSon. It is currently expected to be released on November 27, 2026. The album serves as a follow up to OsamaSon's third studio album, Psykotic (2025) and is supported by the release of one single, "Off That!"

== Background and promotion ==
Throughout 2025, OsamaSon released 2 studio albums: Jump Out and Psykotic, charting at number 151 and number 81 on the US Billboard 200 respectively. He toured behind both albums.

OsamaSon performed at Rolling Loud Orlando on May 10, 2026. During his set, he previewed unreleased music off of Nocturnal. On May 20, OsamaSon released the lead single to the album, "Off That!", to celebrate his birthday, along with an accompanying music video. In an interview with GQ published in June, OsamaSon stated that Nocturnal would run about 26 tracks. In another interview with Morgen Maher, OsamaSon had stated that he has two versions of the album made, however, he intends on making another five versions of it to total it out to seven, OsamaSon's goal is "choose the best 26 songs from all of them", as he wants this album to be perfect.
