= Made Sum Plans =

Song by OsamaSon

from the album Jump Out
- Released: January 24, 2025
- Genre: Rage; trap
- Length: 2:07
- Label: Atlantic
- Songwriters: Amari Deshawn Adham Middleton; William Minnix III
- Producer: Ok

"Made Sum Plans" is a song by American rapper OsamaSon, released on January 24, 2025, as part of his second studio album, Jump Out.

== Background and composition ==
"Made Sum Plans" was produced by OsamaSon's close collaborator Ok (William Minnix), also known professionally as Wegonebeok, who executive produced Jump Out and, according to Paper, produced 15 of the deluxe edition's 20 tracks. In a review for Complex, Jon Barlas wrote that the song finds OsamaSon, whom he described as being from Goose Creek, South Carolina, polishing his song structure and dialing back the distortion typically present in his music, without representing a full departure from his usual sound. Barlas compared the track's teetering synths to "a youthful, cloud-era Uzi-Carti hybrid," paired with bouncy, jerk-influenced percussion. A review from The Oakland Post similarly cited the song among the standout "rages" on Jump Out.

Writing for The Fader, Vivian Medithi included "Made Sum Plans" among the tracks on Jump Out featuring some of OsamaSon's "catchiest choruses ever," alongside "I Got the Fye" and "Fool." In a separate interview with PAPER, OsamaSon confirmed a "drank" reference on the song, one of the few overt drug mentions on the album, which he said reflected a shift away from the more frequent references to drugs like Xanax found on his earlier release Osama Season.

== Reception ==
Complex ranked "Made Sum Plans" 26th on its list of the 30 best rap songs of 2025, with Barlas describing it as functioning as "an oasis" amid the more chaotic material on Jump Out and calling it "an anthem by all measures."

Verge Magazine ranked the song second on its list of the top 10 OsamaSon songs, describing it as a breakout track and "unmistakable fan favorite" from the Jump Out era, an album the outlet noted peaked at number 151 on the Billboard 200. The magazine attributed much of the song's popularity to its melodic hook and polished production, which it said contrasted with yet complemented OsamaSon's chaotic persona, calling it a track that could serve as "a bridge for listeners who enjoy trap and mainstream rap" to engage with OsamaSon's music.

The song was also mentioned in coverage of OsamaSon's first headlining tour of Australia, announced for October 2026, as one of the tracks for which the rapper is known.

== Credits and personnel ==
- OsamaSon – vocals, songwriting
- Ok – production
