= Gone Too Soon (EP) =

2025 EP by Nettspend

EP by Nettspend
- Released: August 22, 2025
- Genres: Rage; jerk; trap
- Length: 3:26
- Labels: Grade A; Interscope
- Producers: RiotUSA; Goldin; Ss3bby

Nettspend chronology
| Bad Ass F*cking Kid (2024) | Gone Too Soon (2025) | Early Life Crisis (2026) |

Gone Too Soon (stylized in lowercase) is a two-track EP by American rapper Nettspend, released under Grade A Productions and Interscope. The EP was released on August 22, 2025, and serves as the bridge between Bad Ass F*cking Kid and Early Life Crisis.

== Background and release ==
After garnering attention with his single releases and signing a contract with Grade A Productions and Interscope, Nettspend would go on to release his debut commercial mixtape, titled Bad Ass F*cking Kid. Upon release, the album received critical acclaim and charted at #197 on the Billboard 200 chart, marking it as his debut on the charts. Following the mixtape's release, Nettspend would team up with Xaviersobased and release "Impact" on his 18th birthday. Upon those releases, Nettspend would release Gone Too Soon through Grade A and Interscope.

== Composition ==
=== Overview ===
The EP features two tracks, titled "Stressed" and "Her Friends". On "Stressed", Goldin and RiotUSA handled the production, while Moustafa Moustafa handled the mixing and mastering. On "Her Friends", the track's producer Ss3bby samples Dej Loaf's track "Back Up". Like "Stressed", Moustafa handles the mixing and mastering, while Javon-Gant Graham handles the immersive mixing engineering. Each track clocks in at under two minutes, with "Stressed" being at a run time of one minute and 45 seconds; "Her Friends" sits at one minute and 41 seconds. Shahzaib Hussain of Clash wrote how the EP is "a kaleidoscopic trip through his idiosyncratic blend of warped, glitchy post-rage, experimental rap, punk and digicore."

=== Songs ===
On "Stressed", the track sees Nettspend "melt falsetto into trap drums, guttural adlibs, and dizzying tones". "Her Friends" sees Nettspend approach a "bass-heavy shout-along designed for midnight drives and sticky club floors."

== Critical reception ==
Upon release, the two tracks received critical acclaim among reviewers and fans online. The EP was co-signed by American rapper and streamer PlaqueBoyMax. Additionally, "Stressed" went viral on the social media platform TikTok, with videos using the song having over 25 million views.

== Track listing ==
All tracks written by Gunner Shepardson.

Gone Too Soon track listing
| No. | Title | Writer(s) | Producer(s) | Length |
|---|---|---|---|---|
| 1. | "Stressed" | Gunner Shepardson; Ephrem Lopez; Joshua-Goldin-McCarthy; Moustafa Moustafa | RiotUSA; Goldin | 1:45 |
| 2. | "Her Friends" | Shepardson; Moustafa; Sebastian Aguilar; Kyle Adams; Sean Anderson; Clenton Gosberry; Brian Jeffries; Deja Trimble | Ss3bby | 1:51 |
| Total length: | | | | 3:26 |

Notes

- All tracks stylized in lowercase

Sample credits

- "Her Friends" contains a sample of "Back Up", written by Deja Trimble and Sean Anderson and performed by Dej Loaf and Big Sean.
