= NXO =

Upcoming collaborative project by Nettspend and OsamaSon

Studio album by Nettspend and OsamaSon
- Released: 2026 (scheduled)
- Labels: Grade A; Interscope

NXO (an abbreviation of Nettspend x OsamaSon) is an upcoming collaborative album by American rappers Nettspend and OsamaSon. The project was teased by Nettspend in a June 2026 video interview, in which he also alluded to an accompanying joint tour.

== Background ==
Nettspend and OsamaSon first met in late 2023 and followed through with their first joint track together, titled "Wake Up", which was released on September 23, 2023. Then, in June 2024, the two collaborated again to release their track "Withdrawals", upon release, it received critical acclaim from music journalists and fans within the rage community. In October 2024, upon the release of his single "IK What You Did Last Summer", OsamaSon stated that he wanted to focus on his second studio album Jump Out without it leaking, from then until its release, OsamaSon began working on it tentatively. During this time, OsamaSon had stated in his interview with The Fader that he had intentions of adding Nettspend on the project, however, the plan failed, as according to OsamaSon, Nettspend "fell asleep in the studio" during recording sessions. Despite this, the two would formulate a track together titled "Pain Talk", the track was then featured on Nettspend's debut studio album Early Life Crisis.

The first mentions of "NXO came from an video interview came on June 13, 2026, with the rap commentator 42Ceo, where Nettspend told viewers to look out for an "NXO" album and tour next.
