= BloodHound Q50 =

American rapper (2004–2026)

- BloodHound Q50 in 2026

Background information
- Also known as: Q50
- Born: Mikquale T. A. Cooper; August 6, 2004; Chicago, Illinois, U.S.
- Died: September 13, 2026 (aged 22) Chicago, Illinois, U.S.
- Cause of death: Gunshot wounds
- Genres: Drill; hip-hop
- Occupations: Rapper; singer; songwriter
- Years active: 2023–2026
- Labels: Signal; Grade A; Columbia

Mikquale T. A. Cooper (August 6, 2004 – September 13, 2026), known professionally as BloodHound Q50, was an American rapper, singer and songwriter from Chicago, Illinois. He was associated with the city's drill scene.

Cooper began releasing music in 2023 and drew wider attention in 2024 with the singles "Triple 3", "Splash Bros", and "Don't Blink or Stare", after which he signed to Signal Records. He released two albums, Long Live My Brudda He Prolly Kilt Yo Brudda (2025) and Get Back or Die Trying (2026), and performed at the Rolling Loud festival in 2026. He was shot and killed at a gas station in Chicago's Fuller Park neighborhood on September 13, 2026, at the age of 22.

== Early life ==
Cooper was born on August 6, 2004, to Machetta Dudley and was raised in Chicago, Illinois. Cooper also spent part of his childhood living in Northwest Indiana. He spents time with his biological mother and his sister. Throughout his school, Cooper had controversies in middle school, where he allegedly bring a "BB gun" and fatally shot a girl in the head. He was later expelled from the sixth grade. He then had a physical altercation with a student in Merrillville High School, which later went viral on social media. At the age of 17, he graduated high school.

== Career ==
=== 2023–2024: Early releases and Signal Records ===
Cooper began rapping in 2023 and initially did so without professional ambitions, but pursued music more seriously after the tracks "Big 3" and "Coffin" attracted attention online. In July 2024, a month after the killing of his cousin, fellow Chicago rapper Bloodhound Lil Jeff, Cooper released his first commercial single, "Splash Bros".

He followed it with "Triple 3", "Go", and "BH4L", which featured collaborators including Lil Scoom89 and Rell Vert as well as posthumous verses from Lil Jeff. Cooper subsequently signed to Signal Records, an imprint of Columbia Records, and issued the singles "Long Live My Bruddas" and "Don't Blink or Stare" before the end of the year.

=== 2025: Long Live My Brudda He Prolly Kilt Yo Brudda ===
In April 2025, Cooper released Long Live My Brudda He Prolly Kilt Yo Brudda, which collected several of his 2024 singles alongside new material. The album was issued through Signal Records under exclusive license from Grade A Productions. In June 2025, Cooper canceled a performance at Summerfest in Milwaukee Due to security reasons by Summerfest. In an April interview with VladTV that year, Cooper said that "BloodHound" was a rap name rather than the name of a crew, and that "Q50" referred to the Infiniti Q50. In August 2025, reports circulated on social media claiming that Cooper had been shot and killed in St. Louis. He publicly denied the reports and later referenced the episode in his lyrics.

=== 2026: Get Back or Die Trying ===
On August 6, 2026, Cooper released his second album, Get Back or Die Trying, his 22nd birthday. The nine-track project runs approximately eighteen minutes and includes "Hall of Fame", "Bloody Storm", and "Lemon Lime", the last of which features a posthumous appearance by Bloodhound Lil Jeff. Like its predecessor, it was released through Signal Records under exclusive license from Grade A Productions. The single "Head Taps" followed on August 20, 2026. Earlier in 2026, Cooper performed at Rolling Loud in Orlando, Florida. He also appeared as a guest on Not a Chance in Hell, a collaborative album by Mozzy and EST Gee.

== Death ==
CCTV footage of the gunmen firing shots at Cooper outside the gas station

Shortly before 4:00 a.m. (CDT) on September 13, 2026, Cooper was shot while seated in the driver's seat of a white Tesla at a BP gas station at 4248 South Wentworth Avenue, in Chicago's Fuller Park neighborhood. According to a preliminary Chicago Police Department report, two vehicles pulled alongside his car and gunmen from both opened fire, discharging more than fifty rounds. Cooper was struck five times in the head, neck, chest, back, and shoulder, and was pronounced dead at the scene.

Police said that surveillance footage reviewed by officers showed four of the assailants dressed in black, one in a green hooded sweatshirt and another in a black one, and that the two vehicles fled south onto the Dan Ryan Expressway. The Chicago Police Department did not initially release the victim's name. The Cook County medical examiner's office identified him as Mikquale T. Cooper, and a manager at AMF Music Group confirmed that he was the performer known as BloodHound Q50. As of November 1, 2026, no arrests had been made and no motive had been announced; detectives from the department's Area One were investigating.

=== Reactions ===
Tributes were posted following Cooper's death by the Rolling Loud festival and by DJ Vlad, who had interviewed him in 2025. His mother, Machetta Dudley, publicly criticized people who mocked her son online after his death. American Rapper Meek Mill said he felt "haunted" by footage of Cooper's death. American rapper Nettspend released the track "LL50" off his EP Virginia Creeper, which sees him pay homage to Cooper.

== Discography ==
=== Studio albums ===
Title	Album details
Get Back or Die Trying	Released: August 6, 2026; Label: Signal, Grade A; Format: LP, digital download, streaming

=== Mixtapes ===
Title	Album details
Long Live My Brudda He Prolly Kilt Yo Brudda	Released: April 2, 2025; Label: Signal, Grade A; Format: LP, digital download, streaming

=== Charted and certified singles ===
Title	Year	Peak chart positions	Certifications	Album
Title	Year	US R&B/HH	Certifications	Album
"Triple 3" (with Bloodhound Lil Jeff and Lil Scoom89)	2024	50		Non-album singles
"Don't Blink Or Stare" (featuring Bloodhound Lil Jeff and CEO Trayle)	2024	–	RIAA: Gold	Non-album singles
"—" denotes a recording that did not chart or was not released in that territory.

== See also ==
- List of murdered hip-hop musicians
