= The Whole World Is Free =

2024 single by OsamaSon

Single by OsamaSon

from the album Jump Out
- Released: November 12, 2024
- Recorded: 2024
- Genre: Rage
- Length: 1:44
- Label: Atlantic Records; Motown
- Songwriters: Amari Deshawn Middleton; William Dale Minnix III; Sonny Moore
- Producer: OK

OsamaSon singles chronology
"Just Score It" (2024)	"The Whole World Is Free" (2024)	"Demon Home" (2025)

Music video
- "The Whole World Is Free" on YouTube

"The Whole World Is Free" is a song by American rapper OsamaSon. It was released on November 12, 2024, through Atlantic Records and Motown as the lead single from his third studio album, Jump Out. OsamaSon wrote it alongside producer OK.

Sampling Skrillex's "Scary Monsters and Nice Sprites" off of the EP of the same name, the track was previously teased in the music video for "IK What You Did Last Summer", which included a snippet of the track. The track is a feverish, polychromatic, trap-style song that is submerged by volcanic percussion. An accompanying music video for the track, directed by GK and Stan Smith, was released two days after.

== Background and composition ==
"The Whole World Is Free" runs for one minute and 44 seconds. OsamaSon co-wrote the song with William Dale Minnix III and Moustafa Moustafa. Minnix handled the track's production, while Moustafa handled the track's engineering, mixing, and mastering.

== Critical reception ==
Dimas Sanfiorenzo of Complex praised the track, writing how the track "presents a brighter, almost cheerful soundscape that bubbles under the dissonance." According to AllMusic, "The Whole World Is Free" makes listeners feel "unbridled excitement" over a Skrillex-sampling instrumental beat.

Olivier Lafontant of Pitchfork wrote how the track is "a feverish, polychromatic Skrillex flip completely submerged by volcanic percussion." Bryson "Boom" Paul of HotNewHipHop wrote how the track features a distorted production featuring OsamaSon's typical trap style music. Christian Eede of The Quietus wrote how the Skrillex-sampled track is " jarringly addictive."
