= Virginia Creeper (EP) =

2026 EP by Nettspend

EP by Nettspend
- Released: October 30, 2026
- Genres: Rage; trap
- Length: 14:56
- Label: Interscope
- Producers: Che; Nettspend; 1Deep; Exset; CXO; Jenry; Zoot; Zuro

Nettspend chronology
Him (2026)	Virginia Creeper (2026)	Slut (2027)

Virginia Creeper is the debut commercial EP by the American rapper Nettspend. Released through Interscope Records, the EP was released on October 30, 2026, and features music production from Nettspend himself, Che, 1Deep, Exset, CXO, Jenry, Zoot, and Zuro, who have all frequently collaborated with Nettspend in the past.

Driven by hedonist ethos, coupled with moments of deep emotion, Virginia Creeper is a rage and trap EP which is characterized by its video-game like synthesizers, distorted instrumentals, booming 808s, snarling vocals, and digitalized, soft-clipped sounds. Upon release, the EP generated positive reviews with music journalists praising Nettspend's energetic approach and experimental style, while keeping it concise and not stretching its duration length.

== Background and release ==
In March 2026, Nettspend released his debut studio album Early Life Crisis through Interscope and Grade A Records. Upon release, the album generated mixed reviews among music journalists with critics critiquing the album's lack of uniqueness, sound, and overall repetitiveness. On April 30, 2026, Nettspend released his compilation album Him. He followed up that release with the singles "Sober" and "KickAss (Pull Up Pls)" with Che, which both respectively released on August and September.

Nettspend began teasing Virginia Creeper on October 17, 2026, after he told fans at his III Points Music Festival set that he would be releasing an EP soon. That same day, Nettspend previewed his track "LL50", which pays homage to the late rapper BloodHound Q50, who died from gun violence in September 2026. Two days after, Nettspend announced the EP's name and release date on social media. On October 23, 2026, Nettspend's frequent collaborator CXO previewed a teaser for the EP, revealing that the tracks "LL50" and "Get Guap" was featured on the EP. Six days later, on the night of the release, Nettspend showcased the EP's cover art. The EP was officially released on October 30, 2026. The EP's title alludes to the vine native of Nettspend's home state.

== Composition ==
=== Overview ===
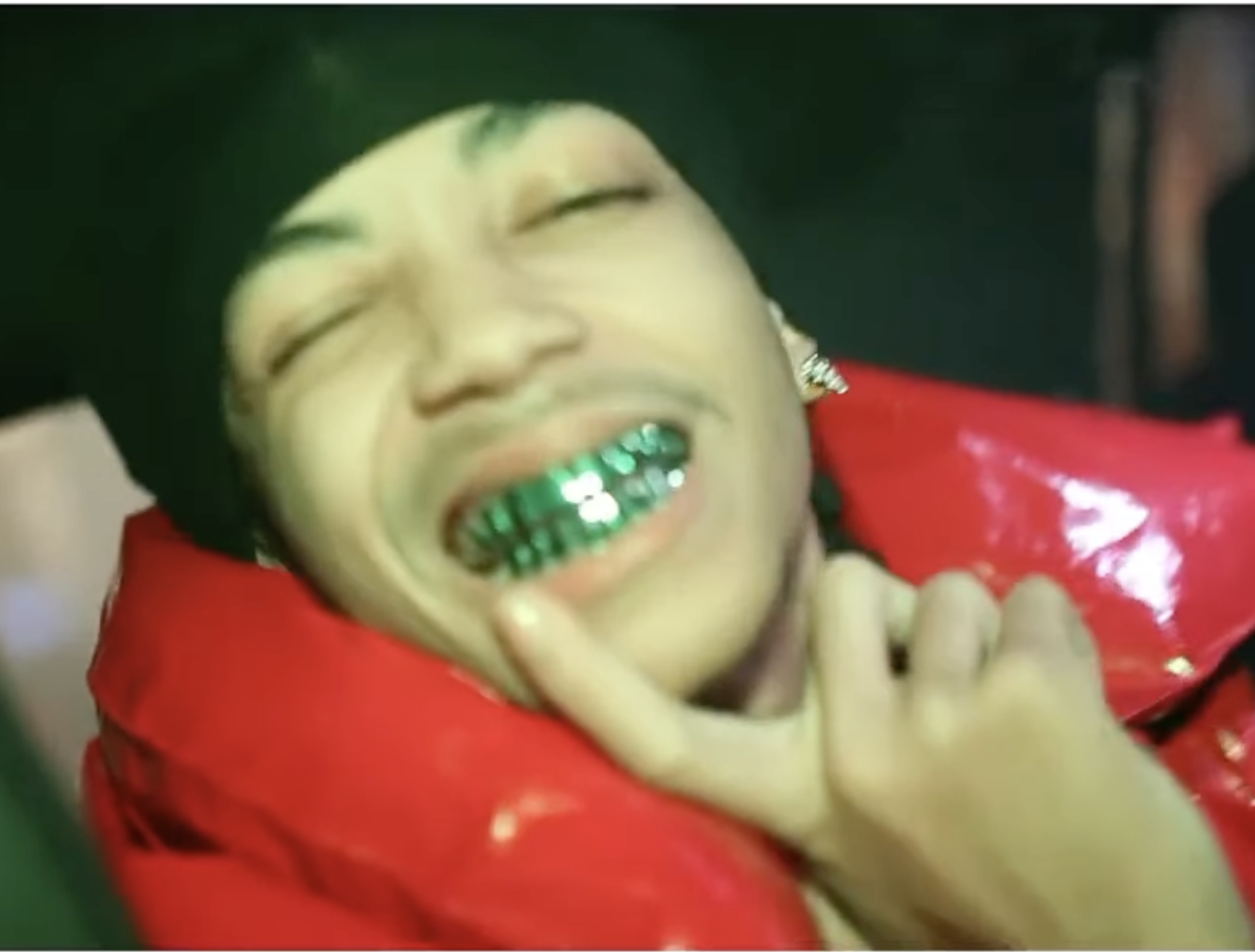
Che, a close friend and collaborator of Nettspend, handled the production on "Nite Nite".

Virginia Creeper is a six-track rage and trap EP that sees Nettspend expand on the style of his former releases. The EP features loud and distorted synthesizers, abrasive beats, booming 808s, snarling vocals, and digitalized, soft clipped sounds. The album's sound and texture aims to incite mosh pits rather than introspection. According to Rachel Stone of BroadwayWorld, she called the project a "furious, filler-free" project packed with "fiery vocals and fried beats." Driven by a hedonist ethos, Nettspend's lyrics consist of flexes surrounding women, wealth, and being better than his oppositions. Along with his constant flexes, Nettspend raps about the downside that come with living such a lavish lifestyle, coming with a more diaristic approach, he pays his due respect to fallen friends and takes a more personal approach on certain tracks.

=== Songs ===
The opening track to Virginia Creeper, "Same Language", sees Nettspend frequently flex his lavish lifestyle over a trap beat that is packed with intense rhythms and abrasive textures. "Get Guap" features a more sinister approach, which sees Nettspend utilize "growling" vocals paired with "eerie synthesizers". On "6 Weeks", Nettspend pushes his vocal limit with constant snarling, yelping, and twisting of his vocal cords; on the hard-hitting instrumental, his voice swerves from melodic runs to staccato barrages. "LL50" sees Nettspend approach a dark and distorted CXO instrumental, which sounds like an "8-bit Nintendo RPG getting pummeled by a trunk-rattling subwoofer." Across the track, Nettspend litters bars paying homage the fallen rapper and former friend BloodHound Q50, while rapping about his wealth and dismissing fake friends. On the Che-produced "Nite Nite", Nettspend continues the trend of his constant flexes. On the final track "JSX", Nettspend raps about living a dangerous life that has its highs and lows, a reviewer from Rating Games Music labeled "JSX" as one of the top three tracks off the EP.

== Critical reception ==
Upon release, reviews for Virginia Creeper were mixed to positive; a reviewer from Rating Games Music gave the project a 3.5 out of 5, calling it energetic, hype-inducing, and intentional. They labeled "JSX", "LL50", and "Same Language" as the standout tracks off the EP. Eric Alper wrote how concise the project is, stating how it allowed Nettspend to experiment with different styles without stretching its length. In a less favorable review by Anthony Fantano, he spoke about how Virginia Creeper doesn't showcase Nettspend's growth as a rage artist at all and shows how his sound and style are regressing with each release. In the first week ending of November, the track "Get Guap" was listed on the "Pitchfork Selects" playlist by Olivier Lafontant.

== Track listing ==
All tracks are written by Gunner Shepardson.

Virginia Creeper track listing
No.	Title	Writer(s)	Producer(s)	Length
1.	"Same Language"	Gunner Shepardson; Henry Jarnigan; Gabriel Aaron Brown	Jenry; 1Deep	2:21
2.	"Get Guap"	Nathaniel Campos	CXO	2:15
3.	"6 Weeks"	Maguire Austin	Nettspend; Zoot; Exset	3:32
4.	"LL50"	Campos	CXO	2:15
5.	"Nite Nite"	Chase Shaun Mitchell	Che	2;14
6.	"JSX"	Campos; Nicholas Jones	CXO; Zuro	2:16
Total length:				14:56

=== Notes ===
- Tracks one and five are stylized in lowercase.
- Track three is stylized as "6weeks".

== Personnel ==
Credits adapted from Apple Music, and Tidal.

- Nettspend - recording engineer
- Nathaniel "CXO" Campos - mastering, mixing
