= Early Life Crisis =

Studio album by Nettspend
- Released: March 6, 2026
- Recorded: 2024–2026
- Genres: Rage; trap
- Length: 48:22
- Labels: Grade A; Interscope
- Producers: Cranes; CXO; Gyro; Legion; Ok (Note: Also known as Wegonebeok); Otwreg; Rok; Skai; Ss3bby; Warren Hunter

Nettspend chronology
Gone Too Soon (2025)	Early Life Crisis (2026)	Him (2026)

Early Life Crisis (stylized in all lowercase) is the debut studio album by American rapper Nettspend. It was released through Grade A Productions and Interscope Records on March 6, 2026. It is the follow up to his debut mixtape Bad Ass F*cking Kid. The album features guest appearances from OsamaSon and YoungBoy Never Broke Again, with production from Rok, CXO, Skai, Legion, Gyro, Ok, Otwreg, Ss3bby, and Warren Hunter.

Originally planned for February 27, 2026, the album's release was delayed to March 6 for reasons that are not yet clear. Upon release, the album received mixed reviews from music critics. Early Life Crisis marked Nettspend's second project to debut on the Billboard 200 chart with a number 39 debut, the first of which was his 2024 mixtape Bad Ass F*cking Kid, which peaked at number 197.

== Background and promotion ==
Nettspend signed with record labels Interscope and Grade A Productions in 2024, after which he released his debut commercial mixtape, Bad Ass F*cking Kid. It was Nettspend's breakthrough project, debuting at number 197 on the Billboard 200. Nettspend then released "Impact" with Xaviersobased, and Gone Too Soon to promote the project. From March to April, he embarked on his Impact Tour with Xaviersobased, which was sponsored by Vans. Following the releases, Nettspend began to tease the album heavily, creating an online browser game where players can compete for access to Nettspend's archival footage and unreleased audios, and he created a dedicated phone number in promotion of the album. The project was intended to be released on February 27, 2026, but due to unknown reasons, it got held back to March 6, with the announcement being made via an Instagram video. On March 3, Nettspend revealed the album's track list on his alternative Instagram account.

== Composition ==
=== Overview ===
Early Life Crisis consists of 21 tracks. It is a rage album characterized by AutoTune and intense vocals, melodics, aloof flows, and intense distorted production from an assortment of producers. Lyrically, the tracks on Early Life Crisis reflect the experiences of a generation pushed into adulthood at an accelerated pace, expressing the pressures and anxieties of a resilient youth culture navigating a challenging and often unforgiving world.

=== Songs ===
The album starts melodically with "You Ready?", which sees Nettspend reminisce on his runway on Miu Miu, rapping "I'm Miu in Miu, but I ain't got no role models". Writer Alexandria Elise of Shatter Standards wrote how the couplet is fairly interesting and is distinguishable because of its "sustained engagement with race or borrowed style" that the album attempts to incorporate; "it just raps", according to Elise. Vivian Medithi of The Fader wrote how "CE" sees Nettspend's "voice sounding like a dying squawk amidst heavy machinery and metallic percussion". Elise wrote how "CE" sees Legion's production on the track bend even darker and heavier with Nettspend's vocals. "CE" later transitions into "Pain Talk", with Elise writing that OsamaSon sees the two trade verses over a "churning production" courtesy of Rok, Gyro, Skai, and Warren Hunter. Elise also mentioned how the track's refrain "strips down to the simplest possible version of what the entire record circles around". Nettspend's verses consist of recreational drug use and numbing pain, while OsamaSon's verse "hits harder bar-for-bar". Hattie Lindert of Pitchfork felt that "Pain Talk" was a "low point" on the album and demonstrate's Nettspend ability to "out-Carti even if you're willing to believe his claim that me and you don't trap the same". The track later transitions into "Crack". Vivian Medithi wrote that the track is immediately a standout on the album, complementing its "beautiful" quality. He writes how "Crack" sees Nettspend "bringing a Jetsonmade bounce to Crystal Castles-type arpeggios that spur a silly but addictive hook". Elise wrote how "Crack" "is the closest Nettspend comes to pop styles. A melody that shouldn't work lodged inside production that could pass for a malfunctioning Game Boy". Shahzaib Hussain of Clash Magazine wrote how "Still Standing" features "crystalline melodies".

Transitioning to "Who TF Is U", Medithi wrote how the song the "album's centerpiece", writing how Nettspend brags about how he "don't eat no catfish" and his "baby mama batshit". The latter phrase sticks out even among Nett's constant use of "slime" and other trap music signifiers. The track also flips the cadence of Drake off of his track "Hotline Bling". Elise wrote how "Trap House 2016" sees Nettspend discuss his mother knowing he is doing drugs and noting he is "old enough to pay your rent, not old enough to buy no gin". Lindert wrote that "where he resolves to 'burn the trap house' like Elmo engulfed in flames, is also a tough hang". "Trap House 2016" goes into "Masked Up" with Youngboy Never Broke Again, with Lindert praising how Youngboy is a better pairing with Nettspend compared to OsamaSon on "Pain Talk". Lindert wrote how on "Stab", Nettspend flirts with a fan "as if yearning for the playful stoner romp of Bad Ass F*cking Kid highlight "Beach Leak". On "Halftime", Nettspend insults the rapper Fakemink, while also making references to Dean Blunt on the track. Elise wrote how "Halftime" featured some of CXO's best production.

"Meet Me in Richmond" sees Nettspend show his vulnerability, as he is sentimental about a home which is incapable to reach, in a way "that you start to notice a person underneath the distortion who keeps reaching for something and pulling his hand back". The track "No Sleep" sees Nettspend approach a "rattling" Cranes instrumental to plainly rap about using drugs to numb pain. On the "sweetly sinister" "<3 me", Nettspend demonstrates his ingenuity and vocals that recall those of "lovelorn vintage Playboi Carti". "Paris Hilton" sees Nettspend name-drop the media personality as he walks alongside her during Gucci Fashion Week in Paris in 2026; Hilton has stated that she enjoys the track. According to Ihaza, both "Paris Hilton" and "Sick" see Nettspend "land the rage rap sound flawlessly, infusing the otherwise cacophonous sound with a sense of melody — to make the album work overall". Elise wrote how "Paris Hilton" and "Sick" both see "the beat [carry] its own weight and Nettspend just sits on top of it, phoning in ad-libs and recycled bars about guns and women with nothing binding them to what's underneath".

Medithi praised "Cross Em Out", as he wrote how Nettspend's vocal intensity matches that of the track production. "Shades On" samples the 2013 song "23" by Mike Will Made-It and Miley Cyrus. Hussain wrote how the track is purely exhilarating, "ripping through siren-like synths". Medithi referred to the track as "fun". Ihaza writes how the "glossy" beat pairs well with Nettspend's vocals. "Plan B" sees Nettspend "admit that he blacked out too hard off a bar to remember anything except that he had sex and needs the girl to take a Plan B". On "Make It Bleed", Elise wrote how, similar to "Sick" and "Paris Hilton", "the beat carries its own weight and Nettspend just sits on top of it". "Hey, Hello" sees Nettspend return to a melodic flow, and sees some "light" shine through across a "dense and dark record". Lindert wrote how "'mellow' like Tobehanna's finest" the track is. Elise wrote how Nettspend ponders on if "Am I the villain?". Finally, on "Lil Bieber", the track sees a surreal and skyscraping "lean-soaked hook" from Nettspend. Lindert wrote how "Lil Bieber" sees Nettspend reference ongoing comparisons to Justin Bieber, adopting a softer vocal style while delivering lyrics centered on romantic pursuit. The song reflects his willingness to embrace the comparison amid renewed interest in Bieber's influence. In conclusion, Elise wrote how the track is one of Nettspend's most revealing tracks, not because it is of the highest quality, but because he admits his own faults, acknowledging being a teen idol. The second verse is more distinct and somber, containing praised imagery, although being criticized for poor vocal delivery. Elise writes how the song sounds similar to "druggy rambling", and "it probably is".

== Critical reception ==
Professional ratings
Review scores
Source	Rating
AllMusic	2/5 stars
Pitchfork	5.9/10
Rolling Stone	3/5 stars
Shatter the Standards	2.5/5 stars

Early Life Crisis generally received mixed to average reviews. Alexandria Elise of Shatter the Standards gave the album a slightly below-average rating of 2.5 out of 5 stars, saying there are too many unnecessary tracks and that a third of it is not needed. However, she says the tracks "worth hearing are worth taking the time to find". Overall, her favorite tracks were "Crack", "Hey, Hello"; and "Pain Talk" with OsamaSon. Medithi wrote how Nettspend's biggest problem is that "he's too famous"; Nettspend's name and image are widely recognized—older people use it to show cultural knowledge, younger people use it for memes—but he is often misunderstood despite constant discussion. However, Early Life Crisis sees Nettspend's "edges… starting to fray". Jeff Ihaza of Rolling Stone praised the album, writing how the "glossy beats familiarity" pair well with Nettspend's vocals, and how it "offers a glimpse into how the rap world might metabolize the new sounds bubbling up from the underground". To end off the review, Ihaza said how "Early Life Crisis sounds like a volatile but impossible-to-ignore early draft" in the youth culture.

Hattie Lidnert of Pitchfork rated the album 5.9 out of 10. She wrote that Nettspend appears unsure of what unique value he brings to the fast-changing, increasingly crowded hip-hop scene. She finished by saying his project feels immature and outdated—like Nettspend has not grown musically and is struggling to compete with newer artists. Anthony Fantano of The Needle Drop gave the album a "Not Good" review, criticizing the album for its annoying and generic rage beats paired with annoying attempts of choruses and refrains paired with cringe bars. Fantano ended his review off by saying how Nettspend's album is pure "mind numbing drivel", and how Nettspend has lost his "cutting edge" sounds and that his novelty has worn off, comparing Early Life Crisis to that of a lesser version of what Matt Ox did growing up; he stated how people who enjoy rage music should listen to artists such as Che, OsamaSon, and 2Slimey as they seem more interesting comparing to Nettspend. The TiVo Staff of AllMusic gave the album a rating of 2 out of 5, writing how tedious the project got due to Nettspend's repetitiveness and one-dimensional personality. The staff wrote how after all the fun is drained out, the album becomes numbing and an "interminable slog of noise".

== Commercial performance ==
Early Life Crisis debuted at 39 on the Billboard 200, selling 20,000 album equivalent units in its first week. It marked Nettspend's second appearance on the chart following Bad Ass F*cking Kid, which debuted at 197 on the chart. Additionally, the intro track, "You Ready", debuted at number 26 on the NZ Hot music charts.

== Track listing ==
Early Life Crisis track listing
No.	Title	Writer(s)	Producer(s)	Length
1.	"You Ready?"	Gunner Shepardson; Nathaniel Campos	CXO	2:28
2.	"CE"	Shepardson; Keifa Carter	Legion	2:40
3.	"Pain Talk" (featuring OsamaSon)	Shepardson; Amari Middleton; Johnny Peng; Kenechukwu Iloh; Rok Curkovic; Warren Hunter	Rok; Skai; Gyro; Warren Hunter	2:50
4.	"Crack"	Shepardson; Curkovic	Rok	1:46
5.	"Still Standing"	Shepardson; Curkovic	Rok	1:59
6.	"Who TF Is U"	Shepardson; Campos	CXO	2:01
7.	"Trap House 2016"	Shepardson; Peng	Skai	2:39
8.	"Masked Up" (featuring YoungBoy Never Broke Again)	Shepardson; Kentrell Gaulden; Campos	CXO	2:17
9.	"Stab"	Shepardson; Carter	Legion	2:31
10.	"Halftime"	Shepardson; Campos	CXO	2:09
11.	"Meet Me in Richmond"	Shepardson; Campos	CXO	2:05
12.	"No Sleep"	Shepardson; Owen Jablonski	Cranes	2:13
13.	"<3 Me"	Shepardson; Reginald Bullock; William Minnix	Ok; Otwreg	1:27
14.	"Paris Hilton"	Shepardson; Iloh; Curkovic; Campos	CXO; Rok; Gyro	2:04
15.	"Sick"	Shepardson; Campos	CXO	2:09
16.	"Cross Em Out"	Shepardson; Michael Sammour	Azure	2:23
17.	"Shades On"	Shepardson; Campos; Mike Will Made It; Miley Cyrus; Jordan Houston; Cameron Thomaz	CXO	2:10
18.	"Plan B"	Shepardson; Iloh	Gyro	2:09
19.	"Make It Bleed"	Shepardson; Sebastian Aguilar	Ss3bby	2:01
20.	"Hey, Hello"	Shepardson; Curkovic	Rok	3:08
21.	"Lil Bieber"	Shepardson; Jablonski	Cranes	3:31
Total length:				48:22

=== Notes ===
- All titles are stylized in all lowercase.

=== Sample credits ===
- "Shades On" contains a sample of "23" by Mike Will Made It, Miley Cyrus, Juicy J, and Wiz Khalifa.

== Personnel ==
Credits adapted from Tidal.

- Gunner Shepardson – vocals, engineering
- Nathaniel "CXO" Campos – mixing, mastering
- Kentrell Gaulden – vocals on "Masked Up"

== Charts ==
Chart performance for Early Life Crisis
Chart (2026)	Peak position
Canadian Albums (Billboard)	100
US Billboard 200	39
US Top R&B/Hip-Hop Albums (Billboard)	13
