= Glokk40Spaz =

American rapper (born 2003)

- Also known as: Lil Glokk40; Spaz Oso Angelo
- Born: Alexander Gabriel Quezada; August 29, 2003 (age 23); Decatur, Georgia
- Origin: Atlanta, Georgia
- Genres: Trap; plugg; rage
- Occupations: Rapper; songwriter
- Years active: 2018-present
- Labels: Columbia Records; EBG Records; TTBRxBLV
- Website: glokk40spaz.com

Alexander Gabriel Quezada (born August 29, 2003), known professionally as Glokk40Spaz, is an American rapper. Born and raised in Metro Atlanta, he is known for pioneering the dark plugg hip-hop microgenre.

== Early Life ==
Quezada was born on August 29, 2003 and was raised in Georgia. He attended Collins Hill High School in Suwanee, Georgia. Quezada stated that he had been classmates with future professional football player Travis Hunter but they were not close. He said that Hunter focused on athletics while he was less engaged in school and spent more time outside of class.

Quezada had a younger sister who was killed in botched robbery.

== Career ==
Quezada began making music in late 2018. His first song, "Glokkn,"was released on SoundCloud with his close friend BabySolid. Soon, he released his debut mixtape Don't Get Took Off on June 16, 2019, hosted by Trap Daily. Quezada started to gain attention after early songs began spreading online with tracks like "Round Here" and "Definition". His following grew even more while he was incarcerated as his music continued to circulate on social media.

Quezada released his mixtape Glokk Files on June 2, 2023. While incarcerated, Quezada’s team continued releasing music he had previously recorded. His debut studio album, Took The Biggest Risk, was released on September 8, 2023. On March 1, 2024, he released the deluxe edition After TTBR. The project included additional material from the same recording period and continued to build attention around his music during his incarceration. In May 2024, he released 3vil Reflection, a collaborative EP with fellow rapper OsamaSon.

In August 2024, Quezada released his second studio album Da Real OSO. A planned deluxe edition was later canceled. In the aftermath of the cancellation, tracks that were planned to be in the deluxe release surfaced omline via leaks. Others were released officially.

In November 2024, he released the EP Slaughter House Recordz. The project included material that had originally been intended for the scrapped deluxe edition of Da Real OSO.

After parting ways with Columbia Records, he returned to releasing music independently. Throughout 2025, he released a series of singles, some of which gained traction on social media. Quezada also performed at Rolling Loud California that same year.

On August 29, 2025, Quezada released his third studio album, Baby Whoa 2 which was a sequel to his 2022 mixtape Baby WHOA. A deluxe edition followed on January 30, 2026 after several delays.

== Musical style ==
Pitchfork cites 21 Savage and Young Nudy as an influence on Glokk40Spaz's sound.

== Legal Issues ==
In August 2021, Quezada was named as a suspect in an alleged armed carjacking in Milton, Georgia. Police said the victim was assaulted and robbed of a Mercedes C-300 and other items.

On June 30, 2022, Quezada was arrested in Fulton County, Georgia on armed robbery charges. During his incarceration, his music continued gaining popularity online and several projects were released by his team. He was later sentenced to six years of probation and released from custody.

== Discography ==
=== Studio albums ===
- Took The Biggest Risk (2023)
- Da Real OSO (2024)
- Baby Whoa 2 (2025)
- Parasomnia (2027)

=== Compilation albums ===
- Glokk Files (2023)

=== EPs ===
- 3vil Reflections (with OsamaSon, 2024)
- Slaughter House Recordz (2024)
