= Shine N Peace =

2023 single by Nettspend

Single by Nettspend
- Released: July 23, 2023
- Recorded: 2023
- Genre: Jerk
- Length: 1:31
- Label: Self-released
- Songwriters: Gunner Shepardson; Dylan Zion O’Reagan; M.A.G.
- Producers: Xion Orion; M.A.G.

Nettspend singles chronology
"Take You Out" (2023)	"Shine N Peace" (2023)	"We Not Like You" (2023)

Music video
- "Shine N Peace" on YouTube

"Shine N Peace" is a song by American rapper Nettspend, released on July 23, 2023. The song was produced by mag and Xion Orion. "Shine N Peace" was ranked as one of the best songs of 2023 by The Fader and The New York Times.

== Composition ==
"Shine N Peace" clocks in at one minute and 31 seconds. Nettspend co-wrote the song with mag and Xion Orion, who handled the song's production, while Nettspend handled the mixing and mastering. Vivian Medithi of The Fader wrote how "Shine N Peace" was considered to be a fan-favorite due to its "frenzied groove and unceasing handclaps." Colin Joyce of the same magazine wrote how "blissed out, blistered, and relentlessly euphoric" the track is; he also wrote how, amidst the "flurry of snares and a slipstream of trance synths", he provides "ecstatic bars about loyalty and a life of crime." Joyce finished off the review with a positive note, saying how Nettspend, like his Novagang collective, has the ability to "stop time and levitate when he wants to."

Taye Rowland-Dixon of Verge Magazine wrote how "Shine N Peace" features a "unique blend of melodic sensibilities and gritty, raw delivery," paired with "themes of resilience and ambition woven into the lyrics." Dixon ended the review on a positive note, writing how the song sees Nettspend as an artist with a distinct voice and aesthetic.

== Critical reception ==
"Shine N Peace" received critical acclaim upon release. The Fader rated "Shine N Peace" at #40 on their top 100 songs of 2023. Jon Caramanica of The New York Times rated "Shine N Peace" as one of the best songs of 2023. Writing for The Face, music journalist Kieran Press-Reynolds labeled "Shine N Peace" as one of the "jerk anthems" of 2023.
