= Psykotic =

psykotic

Studio album by OsamaSon
- Released: October 10, 2025
- Genres: Rage; trap
- Length: 42:37
- Labels: Atlantic; Motion Music
- Producers: Warren Hunter; Gyro; Roxie; Rok; Skai; Shiloh Pena; Kasey Gibson; Adrick Abellera; D'Angelo Durosier; Andrew Edwards; Legion; Kalebh Sliva; OK; Lil O

OsamaSon studio album chronology
Jump Out (2025)	psykotic (2025)	Nocturnal (2027)

Psykotic (stylized in all lowercase) is the third studio album by American rapper OsamaSon, released on October 10, 2025, through Atlantic and Motion Music. The album is a successor to his January 2025 project Jump Out. It features a sole guest appearance from Che, as well as production from producers including Warren Hunter, OK, Legion, Rok, Gyro, Skai, and OsamaSon himself under the alias Lil O.

== Background and release ==
Following the release of his album Jump Out, he would begin teasing Psykotic. On August 20, 2025, OsamaSon would announce that he would have a tour for the upcoming album, which would begin on October 16, 2025, in St. Louis, and will end on December 20, 2025, in Vancouver. Following the tour announcement, on October 2, OsamaSon would reveal the official track list for Psykotic. Five days later, on October 7, 2025, he announced the release date to be on October 10. To prevent the album from leaking, Osamason's team distributed advance copies of the album to select journalists via burned CDs.

A day before the album's release, graphic designer Stunmic revealed the official cover art, and OsamaSon previewed a snippet of the track "Function" on his Instagram profile. The cover artwork sparked controversy amongst fans, with some viewing it as "corny" or criticizing its satanic imagery, although some fans defended it. OsamaSon also defended the cover in an interview with Billboard, stating:

It’s a fire cover art, man! It’s not even nothin’ to get — like if you want me to keep it 100% with you, bro — it wasn’t nothin’ crazy. Like we wasn’t tryin’ to be on some blasphemous s—t—Man, you know what?—We were. Yeah, we were trying to disrespect all the religions! ’em, everybody. F–k how everybody feels. That’s what the cover is, man: you. I sent this s—t to my mom and everything, and she was like, “This is perfect.”

== Composition ==
Nina Corcoran and Jazz Monroe of Pitchfork wrote how Psykotic embraces the true nature of SoundCloud rap, with the two writing, "rage rap earworms belted over hallucinatory beats that split the difference between cloud rap, malfunctioning chiptune, and some maniacally overdriven spin on hyperpop." Elena Bernstein of Hypebeast wrote how psykotic is "A sonic rendering of the rapper's reckless, no-holds-barred surge to the top." She also wrote about how OsamaSon has been directly plugged into the rage-rap underground culture from the very beginning, writing that "his high-voltage trap sound serving as the crux of a rather symbiotic relationship with his fans."

== Critical reception ==
psykotic ratings
Review scores
Source	Rating
AllMusic	4/5 stars
laut.de	4/5 stars
The Needle Drop	6/10 (Note: Specifically, Fantano rated the album between a "strong six to light seven out of ten".)
Pitchfork	7.2/10

Psykotic received positive reviews. HotNewHipHop described it as "one of the wildest albums you'll hear in 2025," praising its "glitchy, blown out beats, and heavy autotuned vocals," though also noting that "this may not be for you." Fred Thomas of AllMusic believed the album "will most likely prove to be too much for fans of traditional rap, but for those who can hear the vibrancy and experimental spirit in the waves of distortion, [it] will represent another thrilling expansion of the boundaries of rage."

Pitchfork gave the album a 7.2 out of 10, with reviewer Olivier Lafontant describing it as "a blur of muggy distortion, Auto-Tune chirrups, and synth-heavy adornments" that captures OsamaSon's growing command of the rage-rap sound. Lafontant praised the project's production and emotional depth, highlighting songs such as "Whats Happening" which he called "one of OsamaSon's hardest tracks," and "Get Away," for its mix of heavy 808s and yearning vocal delivery. However, the review also noted that the project "rarely departs from the established rage-rap template," suggesting that Psykotic refines rather than reinvents OsamaSon's sound. Despite this, Lafontant concluded that Psykotic "shows OsamaSon nearing a peak in his discography," balancing aggression with glimpses of vulnerability.

Anthony Fantano of The Needle Drop was fairly graceful when it came to rating Psykotic. He stated how the album combines the genres of rage with industrial hip hop, and sees OsamaSon incorporate "hype, "synthy, trap beats, paired with mixes that are a wash of apocalyptic levels of distortion." He also labeled how "', absolutely fried". He compared the beats to that of earthquakes blended with TV static, and avalanches of mortar fire, or how a Chief Keef song must sound like at full volume after one has been exposed to a super close range of muzzle blasts from assault rifles. Anthony Fantano also compares OsamaSon's lyricism to that of the actual mood of the album, making it feel like one is actually experiencing it. Despite the screeching noises of distortion paired with grimy synthesizers, Fantano also mentions how the album does see OsamaSon try to approach a more ear-pleasing melodic, and flirtier lyrically, with examples of this being "Worldwide", "She woke Up", "Get Away", which he labeled as a "deep fried Travis Scott song", and "In It", which Fantano personally did not like, with him calling it a "lame" track compared to some of the "harder" songs. Although Fantano didn't love the album, he did mention how Psykotic is an "impressive display of rage-type curation", he labeled how the beat and mix choices will be some of the best that people will hear from the rage genre, and saw OsamaSon featured some pretty "locked in" and "engaged" flows throughout the tracks from the album. Fantano also wrote how this album to his ears sounds like the "truest and most finalist" form, seeing OsamaSon embrace the true sound of underground rap, following his criticism, he gave the album a "six to light seven out of ten".

Yannick Cordas of laut.de summarized Psykotic as an album that blends dark melodies, rage beats, and distorted 808s. He also stated that this project marks a departure from OsamaSon's usual sound, adopting a new, darker tone and claiming how "His autotune-tinged voice blends well with the synths and loud 808s." Outside of the grungy, distorted tracks paired with ear-frying 808s, Cordas complements OsamaSon's diversity, addressing how OsamaSon switches from "an aggressive and chaotic atmosphere to a relaxed and melodic one." Overall, Cordas gave the album a good review, emphasizing how well OsamaSon can slide on any given beat, writing how "OsamaSon flows through almost any chaotic beat with ease. Overall, Psykotic offers a good mix of chaotic and melodic elements."

On their year-end ranking, The Fader had OsamaSon's Psykotic at #16 out of 50.

== Commercial performance ==
Psykotic debuted at No. 81 on the US Billboard 200 chart, the album also sold a total of 13,000 album-equivalent units in its first week it jumped seventy spots higher than OsamaSon's previous album, Jump Out, which debuted at No. 151 on the Billboard 200, making it his highest-charting album to date.

== Track listing ==
All tracks are written by OsamaSon (Amari Middleton) and credited producers. "FMJ" written with Chase Mitchell. "What's Happening" written with Radric Davis, and Xavier Dotson.

Psykotic track listing
No.	Title	Producer(s)	Length
1.	"Habits"	Warren Hunter	3:19
2.	"Worldwide"	Gyro	3:36
3.	"Addicted"	Gyro; Lil O	2:18
4.	"Get Away"	Hunter; Roxie	1:40
5.	"Maag Dump"	Hunter	2:37
6.	"T193"	Hunter	2:33
7.	"FMJ" (featuring Che)	Hunter	3:09
8.	"Inferno"	Rok; Lil O	2:24
9.	"She Woke Up"	OK	1:54
10.	"Function"	Legion	2:17
11.	"In It"	Rok; Hunter	2:45
12.	"Yea I Kno"	Rok; Gyro	2:06
13.	"What's Happening"	Gyro	2:10
14.	"It's A Party"	Rok; Hunter; Legion; Skai	2:16
15.	"Gintama"	Gyro; Lil O	2:07
16.	"Guap Man"	OK	2:48
17.	"Victory Lap"	Rok; Lil O	2:30
Total length:			42:37

=== Notes ===
- "She Woke Up" is stylized as "She woke Up".
- "Yea I Kno" is stylized in lowercase.
- "What's Happening" and "It's A Party" are stylized without their apostrophes.
- "yea i kno" is listed as "yeah i kno" on YouTube.

=== Sample credits ===
- "What's Happening" samples "Shirt Off" by Gucci Mane, written by Radric Davis and Xavier Dotson.

== Personnel ==
All credits adapted from Tidal.

- OsamaSon – vocals (all tracks), songwriting, programming (3, 8, 15, 17)
- Moustafa Moustafa – recording, mixing, mastering
- Warren Hunter – programming (1, 4–7, 11, 14)
- Gyro – programming (2, 3, 12, 13, 15)
- Rok – programming (8, 11, 12, 14, 17)
- OK – programming (9, 16)
- Legion – programming (10, 14)
- Roxie – programming (4)
- Skai – programming (14)
- Che – vocals (7)
- Gucci Mane – sampled vocals, songwriting (13)
- Zaytoven – songwriting (13)

=== Artwork ===
- Stunmic – cover art

== Charts ==
Chart performance for Psykotic
Chart (2025)	Peak position
US Billboard 200	81
US Top R&B/Hip-Hop Albums (Billboard)	20

== See also ==
- 2025 in hip-hop
