= Flex Musix =

2023 studio album by OsamaSon

Studio album by OsamaSon
- Released: December 8, 2023
- Genre: Hip-hop
- Length: 35:43
- Label: Atlantic

OsamaSon studio album chronology
Flex Musix (2023)	Jump Out (2025)

Flex Musix is the debut album by American rapper OsamaSon and his second full-length project. It was released on December 8, 2023, through Atlantic Records. A deluxe edition, Flex Musix (FLXTRA), added six tracks and came out in February 2024.

== Background ==
OsamaSon began self-releasing music in 2021, and his breakout came in April 2023 with "Cts-V". Flex Musix followed his July 2023 project Osama Season. Leor Galil of the Chicago Reader called it his second full-length of the year. OsamaSon went on his first headlining tour in early 2024, with sponsorship from Rolling Loud.

== Composition ==
Galil described the album's sound as heavy on bass, with synths that have "the sweet bite of crystallized sugar". He called OsamaSon's style woozy, disorienting and sometimes suffocatingly layered.

== Critical reception ==
The album received positive reviews. Galil wrote that the album's 17 tracks are a lot to take in and that it could use more variety. He called OsamaSon a strong singles artist, saying he lands his best songs with confidence.

== FLXTRA cover art ==
The cover of Flex Musix (FLXTRA) showed OsamaSon in the pose of Eddie, the mascot of Iron Maiden, in a design closely resembling the cover of the band's album Powerslave. Loudwire described it as a copy, and Music Times called it strikingly similar.

On May 1, 2024, OsamaSon posted to his Instagram story that Iron Maiden was suing him and that the cover was gone. Neither the band nor its lawyers had commented at the time of the reports. In a second story, he said "all love" to the band and asked fans to stop harassing them.

== Track listing ==
Flex Musix standard edition
No.	Title	Length
1.	"Cartel"	1:22
2.	"Rehhab"	1:54
3.	"Need It"	1:37
4.	"Alot"	1:29
5.	"Flxr"	1:45
6.	"Freestyle"	1:51
7.	"Blonde"	2:25
8.	"Baghdad"	2:03
9.	"All Star"	2:02
10.	"For Da Flex"	1:58
11.	"Worst Part"	2:29
12.	"Trenches"	1:57
13.	"Nothing"	2:10
14.	"3x"	1:33
15.	"Boss Up"	2:40
16.	"Kills"	4:08
17.	"Kome Thru"	2:20
Total length:		35:43

Flex Musix (FLXTRA) additional tracks
No.	Title	Length
18.	"Me When"	1:59
19.	"Uno"	1:50
20.	"Str8 Flexin"	1:38
21.	"Congrats"	1:40
22.	"Pop"	1:49
23.	"Talking 2 A Ghost"	2:03
Total length:		46:42
