= Impact (song) =

2025 single by Nettspend and Xaviersobased

Single by Nettspend and Xaviersobased
- Released: March 18, 2025
- Recorded: 2025
- Genre: Jerk; lowend
- Length: 1:55
- Label: Grade A Productions; Interscope Records
- Songwriters: Gunner Sheppardson; Xavier Lopez; Sebastian Emmanuel Aguilar; Jet Jet Barker; Moustafa Moustafa
- Producers: ss3bby; 444jet

Nettspend singles chronology
"F*ck Swag" (2024)	"Impact" (2025)	"Sober" (2026)

Xaviersobased singles chronology
"Shih Tzu" (2024)	"Impact" (2025)	"We Discuss" (2025)

Music video
- "Impact" on YouTube

"Impact" is a single by American rappers Nettspend and Xaviersobased, released on March 18, 2025, Nettspend's birthday. It was released under Interscope and Grade A Productions. Nettspend and Xaviersobased co-wrote the song with Sebastian Emmanuel Aguilar, Jet Jet Barker, and Moustafa Moustafa. Following the track's release, it received critical acclaim from reviewers and fans.

== Background ==
American rappers Nettspend and Xaviersobased first met in 2023 and collaborated on their first track "OTW", which was released on August 23. On February 21, 2025, Nettspend announced his Invert Tour on social media. "Impact" was recorded during the tour, where Xaviersobased served as the tour's opener; it was previewed by the two on an Instagram Live.

== Composition ==
"Impact" has a run time of one minute and 55 seconds. Nettspend co-wrote the song with Sebastian Emmanuel Aguilar, Jet Jet Barker, and Moustafa Moustafa. Aguilar and Barker handled the production, while Moustafa handled the track's mixing and mastering.

"Impact" is a jerk song. According to Michael Saponara of Billboard, the track features a "catchy chorus" and sees Nettspend feature a "syrupy AutoTune-laced melodies" paired with Xaviersobased's catchy verse; he ends off the review in a positive fashion, stating how the Gen-Z "burgeoning rap stars" duo is creating and carving their own lane despite featuring cosigns from the older statesmen of the genre. Davy Reed of The Face wrote how "Impact" sees the duo approach a hyperactive beat to rap about their wealth, parties, Hollywood dreams, and their dark thoughts. He finishes it off by stating how the track may not be for everyone, but it clearly resonates with the youth. Eileen Cartter of GQ wrote how "Impact" sees the "duet over a twinkly beat that sounds like smashing on a xylophone". Aaron Williams of UPROXX wrote how "Impact" is built on a "loopy, synthy beat" of the kind that kids are into nowadays.
