= Bad Ass F*cking Kid =

Mixtape by Nettspend
- Released: December 6, 2024
- Recorded: 2020–2024
- Genres: Trap; rage
- Length: 31:01
- Labels: Grade A; Interscope
- Producers: 3rdup; Bhristo; Bobby Raps; Evilgiane; Kenny Beats; Methboiswag; Ok; RokOnTheTrack; Reklus1ve; Warren Hunter

Nettspend chronology
Kickdoor (2023)	Bad Ass F*cking Kid (2024)	Gone Too Soon (2025)

Bad Ass F*cking Kid is the debut commercial mixtape by the American rapper Nettspend. It was released through Grade A Productions and Interscope Records on December 6, 2024. The mixtape does not contain any features, and was produced by OK, Kenny Beats, RokOnTheTrack, Reklus1ve, Warren Hunter, and Evilgiane.

Nettspend released numerous singles leading up to the release of Bad Ass F*cking Kid, although none were included on the mixtape. Nettspend promoted the release with a tour.

The mixtape was met with mixed reception. Critics praised the track "Beach Leak" and highlighted Nettspend's malapropisms, but noted that the project suffered from Peter Pan syndrome. Nettspend's musical style was compared to that of rappers Chief Keef, Ian, especially Playboi Carti's Whole Lotta Red album, as well as the sound of Justin Bieber. Bad Ass F*cking Kid debuted at number 197 on the US Billboard 200.

== Background ==
Leading up to the release of Bad Ass F*cking Kid, Nettspend released multiple singles. "F*ck Swag", the single which preceded the mixtape, was released on October 3, 2024, alongside an accompanying music video directed by Cole Bennett.

In a September 2024 interview with i-D, Nettspend stated that he wanted to take his time with his debut project, despite frequently releasing singles. During the interview, he also mentioned wanting to satisfy his fans, saying he wanted "to give everybody what they want, for real."

== Release and promotion ==
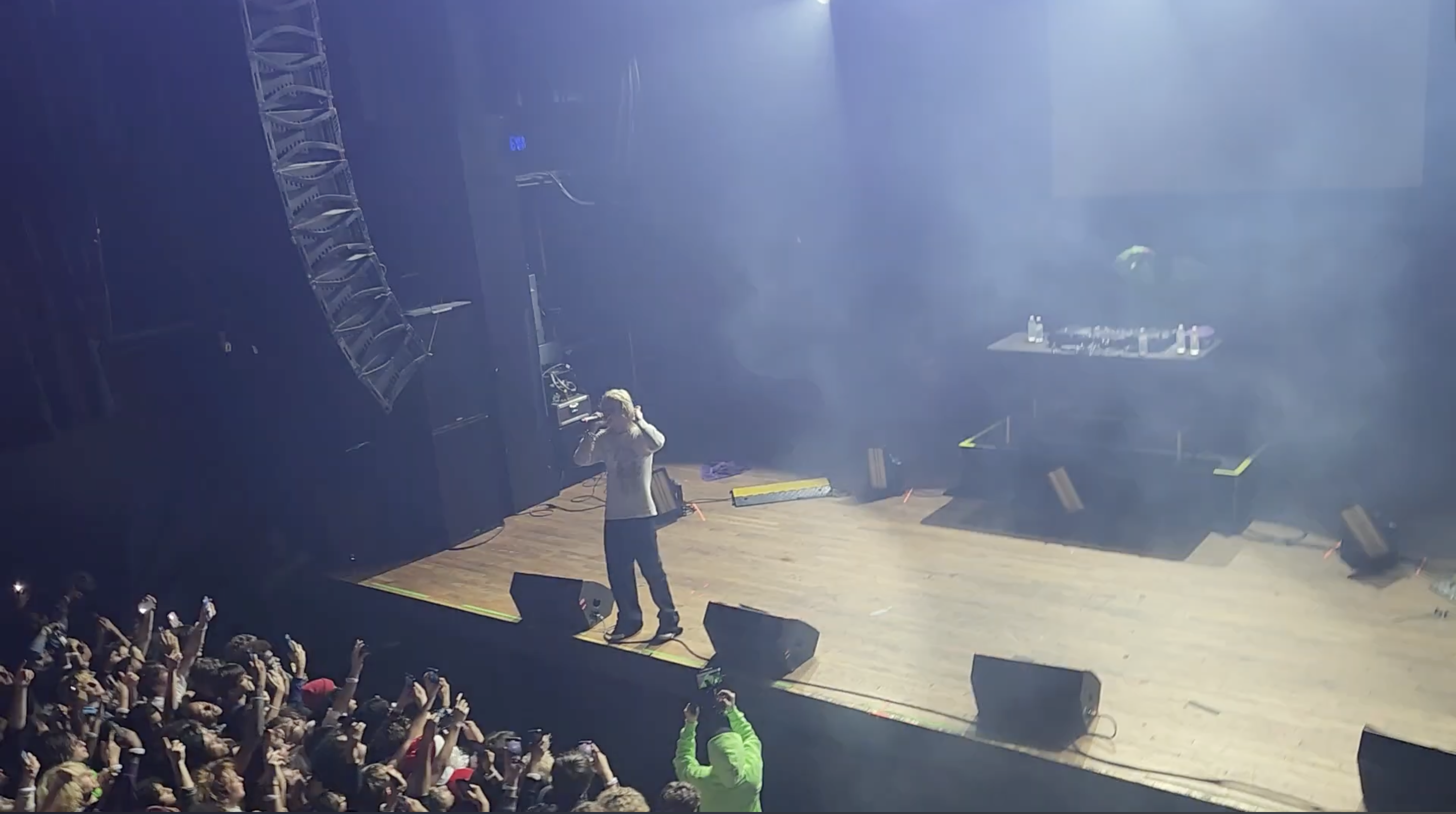
Nettspend performing at The Masquerade in 2024

Bad Ass F*cking Kid was released on December 6, 2024, via Grade A Productions and Interscope Records. It debuted at number 197 on the US Billboard 200. None of the singles Nettspend had previously released were included on the mixtape.

Following the release of Bad Ass F*cking Kid, Nettspend embarked on a promotional tour of the same name, performing at major cities as well as his hometown of Richmond, Virginia. At the Los Angeles show, he brought out English singer PinkPantheress, where she would perform her song, "Break It Off".

== Composition ==
=== Overview ===
Bad Ass F*cking Kid is 15 tracks long with no features. It's a rage, trap, witch house and cloud rap album characterized by oversaturated vocals, AutoTune, clipping, and distorted 808s. The mixtape was mainly produced by OK, Kenny Beats, RokOnTheTrack, Reklus1ve, and Warren Hunter. Lyrically, tracks on Bad Ass F*cking Kid see Nettspend rap about living a hedonistic lifestyle. Writing for The Fader, Vivian Medithi said that Bad Ass F*cking Kid was "aimed at [Nettspend's] core fans" and described it as "Live. Love. ASAP for Zoomers". Zachary Horvath of HotNewHipHop compared Nettspend's style to that of rapper Ian, and wrote that the production had "some intriguing elements." Critics highlighted Nettspend's malapropisms, and noted that the mixtape suffered from Peter Pan syndrome.

=== Songs ===
On the intro, "Growing Up", Nettspend touches on themes of aging, saying he wishes he could "just not grow up". In a Pitchfork review, Meaghan Garvey compared the percussion and synthesizers on the track to "Purpose-era Bieber." Garvey wrote that the second track, "Leader", was "a disjointed string of corny boasts and buzzwords", and described the track's beat as "an old Salem song bit-crushed to oblivion".

On the track "Tyla", Nettspend's Auto-Tuned performance drew comparisons to rapper Chief Keef. Garvey praised the track "ASAP", while Vivian Medithi of The Fader described it as "a bad Xerox of his October single "F*ck Swag". The track "Skipping Class" contains a sample of Grimes' song "Genesis" (2012). Critics praised the track "Beach Leak", which features a Jersey club beat produced by Evilgiane.

On "Skipping Class" Nettspend samples "Genesis" by Grimes and turns it into " ethereal weirdness". On "Beach Leak" Nettspend "breaks into something wildly unexpected" over a jersey club beat.

Elements such as the ambient techno influences embedded in the beat of “Drop the Blunt” and the melancholic piano motif that introduces “A$AP” are quickly subsumed by the dense sonic textures that Nettspend most frequently gravitates toward. Nevertheless, these details contribute to the project’s distinctive and unexpectedly layered sound.

== Critical reception ==
Professional ratings
Review scores
Source	Rating
AllMusic	3/5 stars
laut.de	3/5 stars
Pitchfork	6.1/10
The Needle Drop	2/10

Reviews for Bad Ass F*cking Kid were mixed. Medithi of The Fader wrote that the mixtape was "mostly fluff", and felt that its first half was largely perfunctory. Garvey of Pitchfork scored the mixtape a 6.1/10, saying that it was "mostly derivative and incoherent", but noted that "[Nettspend] does have a strange allure." Music critic Anthony Fantano of TheNeedleDrop gave the mixtape a "light 2", describing it as "Auto-Tuned white noise." Gölz of laut.de wrote that Nettspend's Bad Ass F*cking Kid was "aggressively tasteless but oddly captivating", describing the rapper as "a non-essential character carried by inventive production".

== Track listing ==
All tracks are written by Gunner Shepardson and William Minnix III, additional producers are credited below.

Bad Ass F*cking Kid track listing
No.	Title	Writer(s)	Producer(s)	Length
1.	"Growing Up"	Gunner Shepardson; Rok Curkovic; Carter Bryson; Teun Vroomen	RokOnTheTrack; Bryson; 3rdup	1:44
2.	"Leader"	Shepardson; William Minnix III; Kenneth Blume III	OK; Kenny Beats	1:43
3.	"Project Pat"			2:11
4.	"Tommy"	Curkovic; Warren Hunter	RokOnTheTrack; Hunter	1:59
5.	"Tyla"			2:03
6.	"ASAP"			2:17
7.	"F*ck Cancer"	Roy Scott III	Reklus1ve	2:06
8.	"Skipping Class"			2:13
9.	"Beach Leak"	Giane Chenheu; Christopher Quillin; Robert Richardson	Evilgiane; Bhristo; Bobby Raps	1:46
10.	"Shut Up"			2:05
11.	"Birdbox"			2:30
12.	"Drop the Blunt"	Scott	Reklus1ve	1:59
13.	"Perc Soda"			1:52
14.	"Laughin"			1:42
15.	"Say Please"	Fredrik Willert	Methboiswag	2:46
Total length:				31:01

Webstore exclusive digital deluxe edition
No.	Title	Length
16.	"Winnie Harlow"	2:49
Total length:		33:50

== Personnel ==
- Nettspend – vocals
- Anthony Kilhoffer – mastering, mixing (tracks 1–3, 5–15)
- Moustafa Moustafa – mastering, mixing, engineering (track 4)
- Anand "AJ" Joshi – engineering
- Nick Souza – saxophone (track 1)

== Charts ==
Chart performance for Bad Ass F*cking Kid
Chart (2024)	Peak position
US Billboard 200	197
US Heatseekers Albums (Billboard)	2

== Notes ==
- "ASAP" is stylized as "A$AP".
- "F*ck Cancer" and "Laughin" are stylized in all caps.
- "Beach Leak" is stylized in sentence case.
