= Jump Out =

Studio album by OsamaSon
- Released: January 24, 2025
- Recorded: 2024
- Genre: Rage
- Length: 35:30
- Labels: Atlantic; Motion Music
- Producers: Gyro; Legion; OK (exec.); OsamaSon; Skai; Warren

OsamaSon studio album chronology
Flex Musix (2023)	Jump Out (2025)	Psykotic (2025)

Singles from Jump Out
- 1. "The Whole World Is Free" Released: November 12, 2024

Jump Out is the second studio album by the American rapper OsamaSon, released on January 24, 2025, through Atlantic Records and Motion Music. Going through numerous revisions due to constant leaking, it was primarily produced by OK with contributions from a variety of record producers, including Gyro, Legiiion, Warren Hunter, Skai, Jay Trench, rokonthetrack and OsamaSon himself. Jump Out is a rage album characterized by saturated vocal performances and distorted production utilizing synthesizers and 808 drums. Its lyrical content departed from the drug-heavy themes of his previous work, instead favoring themes of money, fashion, women, and weapons.

Jump Out was supported by its lead single, "The Whole World Is Free"; plans of a rollout for the album were aborted after it was leaked and subsequently released weeks ahead of schedule. It received critical acclaim, with reviewers praising it for being a creative and boundary-pushing release. It was OsamaSon's first album that appeared on the Billboard 200, peaking at number 151. An accompanying tour began in March 2025.

== Background and production ==
In 2023, OsamaSon signed with Atlantic Records and one of its imprints Motion Music and released his debut studio album, Flex Musix. The album was supported by a tour throughout 2024 that was sponsored by Rolling Loud. Later in 2024, he released two collaborative extended plays (EPs): Still Slime with Boolymon and 3vil Reflection with Glokk40Spaz. Throughout his career, information from his personal life and music has been leaked on the Internet. After releasing his single "IK What You Did Last Summer", he stated he wanted to release his next album, Jump Out, without it leaking.

OsamaSon conceived the title of Jump Out while vacationing in Madrid; he felt that he was able to enjoy himself while on vacation due to being sober. This led to him feeling like he was "just jumping out" and felt the title "explained [his] life at that moment". In contrast to his mixtape, Osama Season (2023), the production on Jump Out was handled by people OsamaSon considers his friends. The album was primarily produced by OK, (Note: Also known as Wegonebeok.) who also served as the album's executive producer. OsamaSon was inspired to create music similar to the American duo Snow Strippers after attending one of their live shows with OK. OsamaSon stated that attending the live show "completely changed [his] outlook on everything". Production was also handled by Gyro, Legion, Warren, Skai, and OsamaSon himself.

OsamaSon felt that he approached the creation of Jump Out differently, but added elements from his old music to create something new. He adopted a new recording process after working with the engineer Moustafa Moustafa in a studio. He said that this helped him change his process of mixing, recording, making hooks and verses longer, and song structuring. In studio sessions, OsamaSon generally recorded with all of the lights off because he felt more comfortable knowing that people were not watching him record. He would record for hours at a time and typically recorded around seven songs a session. The song "Waffle House" was recorded in Prague while he recorded ten songs in one session.

== Composition ==
=== Overview ===
The standard edition of Jump Out has 18 tracks, while the deluxe edition includes 2 bonus tracks. It is a rage album characterized by saturated vocal performances and distorted production utilizing synthesizers and 808 drums. Throughout the album, its melodies, drums, bass, and vocals are all mixed to the same volume level. Lyrically, the songs on Jump Out delve in topics revolving around money, fashion, women, and weapons. The album departs from the drug-focused lyrics of his debut; OsamaSon stated that this shift reflects his personal growth. The album utilizes off-mic ad-libs that pan intermittently. The Fader's Jordan Darville felt that this effect "give[s] the impression that [the album] is […] a party, and you're in the center of it". Vivian Medithi from the same magazine wrote that, in contrast to other rage albums, Jump Out favors "melodic euphoria" that recalls Pi'erre Bourne's production on Playboi Carti (2017) and Die Lit (2018) by Playboi Carti.

=== Songs ===
Jump Out opens with "Southside", which presents loud synthesizer melodies fusing with heavy bass hits. Olivier Lafontant of Pitchfork said that OsamaSon's vocal delivery on the track sounds "like a bully dunking your head underwater". The track is followed by "Fool", which Lafontant said has a "seismic jolt". "GTFO the Room" contains snapping beats; Medithi said the track sounds like it is "10 seconds from nuclear implosion". Lafontant viewed it as a new take on the song "Of Course We Ghetto Flowers" (2016) by Lil Uzi Vert. On "Made Sum Plans", OsamaSon makes references towards lean. Medithi called "Break da News" a "checking account statement" that contains a "giddy spiral". The instrumental of "Room 156" employs harsh pan flutes, which Medithi said sounds "like someone threw 'Magnolia' in a wood chipper". The lyric "Bitch you won't know if you never try to go" in the song comes from a place of motivation. The instrumental of "Jumpout" was described by Medithi as "gently fizzing like a Barq's red creme soda". OsamaSon expresses that there are "percs in [his] piss" on "Going Dumbo", a track built around shaking 808 drums. "She Need a Ride" sees OsamaSon dissing the listener for smoking mediocre quality cannabis. Skai's production on "New Tune" "kicks OsamaSon's flow into sport mode", according to Medithi.

"Waffle House" contains a drum-heavy, twitchy instrumental reminiscent of a video game soundtrack. A line in the song uses MAC weapons to mean "Mack", a reference to the rapper Phreshboyswag, who OsamaSon has a feud with. On "I Got the Fye", he claims he is a "big boss bully" and states, "I don't pass out no hugs, bitch, catch a slug." He expressed that the former line is him "flexing" due to people online trying to bully him. He further disavows drugs in the line "I'm addicted to cash, these boys addicted to drugs." "Insta" sees OsamaSon dealing with a girl he finds so attractive that he cannot get mad at her thirst traps; Medithi called the track "nonchalantly skyscraping". OsamaSon applies Auto-Tune to his vocals on the following track, "Frontin". "Mufasa" is a loud track containing pulsating beats; Medithi described it as "glass-shattering". Kieran Press-Reynolds from Pitchfork stated that "Ref" can push rap music closer to noise music; it samples "I Serve the Base" (2015) by Future. Press-Reynolds thought the sample showcases the track is "clearly indebted to rap history". The penultimate track of the standard edition, "The Whole World Is Free", flips a Skrillex sample underneath heavy percussion and a distorted trap instrumental. Its lyrics see OsamaSon seeking to persuade a girl he is infatuated with to be with him, navigating a range of emotions throughout the song. The final track, "Round of Applause", contains "demented showmanship", according to Lafontant. The deluxe edition of Jump Out includes the bonus tracks "Logo" and "Luv".

== Release ==
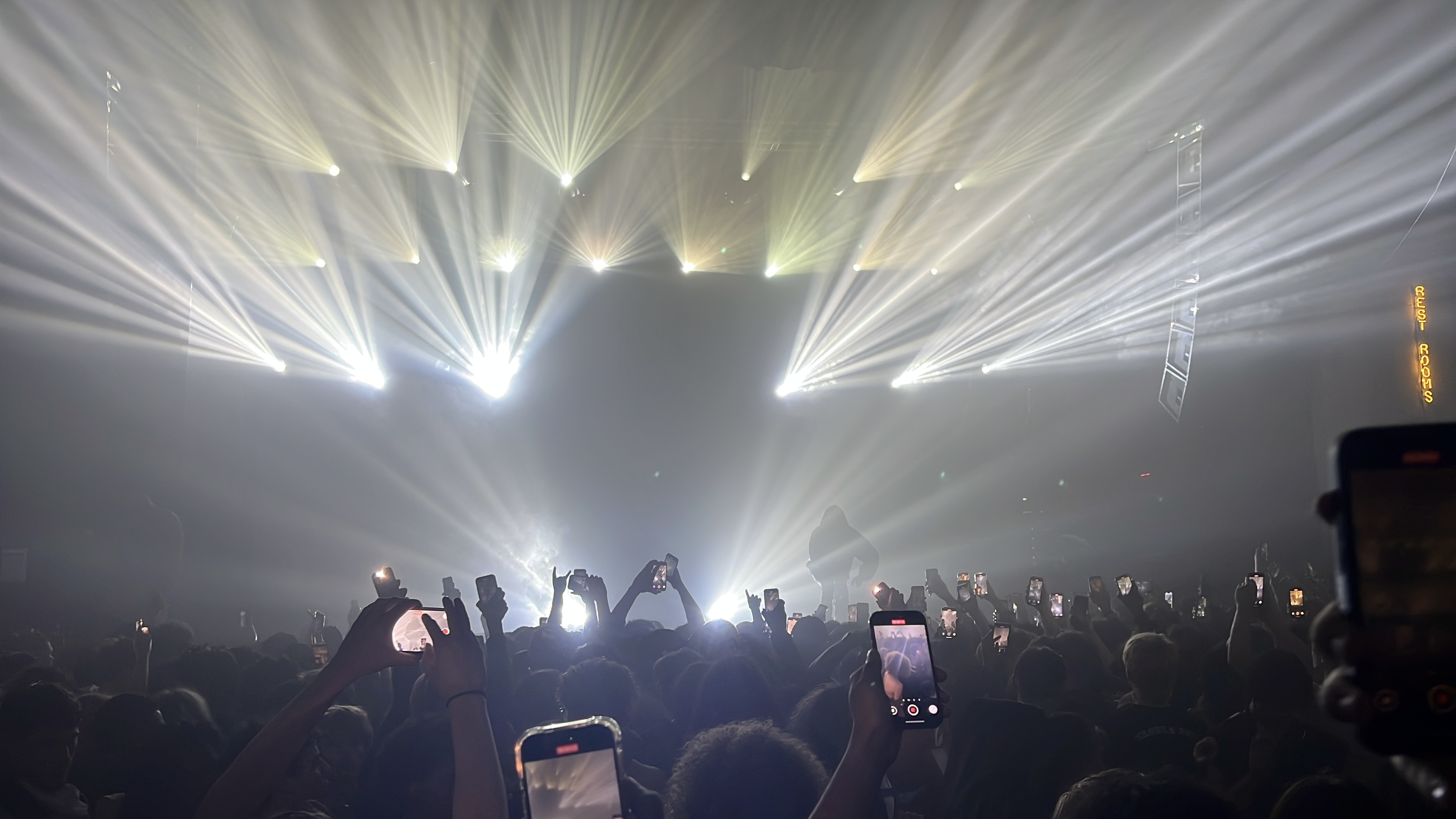
OsamaSon performing at the Majestic Theatre as part of the Jump Out Tour in April 2025

Jump Out's lead single, "The Whole World Is Free", was released on November 12, 2024. On December 24, 2024, a version of Jump Out was leaked, which led to OsamaSon revising the track list. He initially intended for Jump Out to be released on February 14, 2025, however the entire album was leaked on Telegram and Discord in late January, which then spread to other parts of the Internet. This aborted plans of a rollout, prompting the album to be reconfigured another time and released early January 24, 2025, through Atlantic Records and Motion Music. After its release, the album's mixing quality received criticism, to which OsamaSon confirmed that the album would receive updated mixing. Additionally, in an interview with Vivian Medithi of The Fader, OsamaSon had intentions of adding Nettspend to the album, but the plan failed as, according to OsamaSon, Nettspend "fell asleep in the studio" during recording sessions. Commercially, Jump Out peaked at number 151 on the Billboard 200 chart dated February 8; it is his first album to appear on the chart. A tour to support Jump Out began in March 2025. "Ref" received a music video directed by Walker Andrews on April 28.

== Critical reception ==
Jump Out ratings
Review scores
Source	Rating
AllMusic	4/5 stars
Pitchfork	8.2/10

Jump Out was released to critical acclaim. It was awarded the "Best New Music" accolade from Pitchfork; Lafontant stated that OsamaSon's "sound is as distinct as it's ever been" on the album and felt that his delivery on certain lines makes the album fun to listen to. He said the three track run of "New Tune", "Waffle House", and "I Got the Fye" displays catchy melodies, strong personality, and high quality production. He disapproved of tracks such as "Frontin" and "Room 156" and felt that "Insta" became pastiche of a Carti song. He concluded his review by writing that the album "raised the bar for the new SoundCloud scene", arguing that "maybe it was [OsamaSon] in the driver's seat this whole time". AllMusic awarded the album four stars out of five in their review; their writer felt that the sound effects presented across the album can be "occasionally dizzying", but overall praised the album for succeeding "in pushing the limits of rage and experimentally crafted rap".

Bryson "Boom" Paul from HotNewHipHop praised the album for remaining creative and resilient despite its leaks, writing that it "further cement[s OsamaSon's] reputation as a standout voice in the new wave of music". For The Fader, Medithi thought that "I Got the Fye", "Fool", and "Made Sum Plans" contain "some of [OsamaSon's] catchiest choruses ever". For the same magazine, Darville said the album is "a shining example of what makes rage compelling" and praised OK's production for "mak[ing] sure that each of the brief songs has colorful melodies beneath the blistering distortion" across the album. Pitchfork selected "I Got the Fye" as one of the best tracks of its release week; similarly, John Norris from Paper deemed it a standout from the album. Press-Reynolds deemed "Ref" a standout track. In a review of "The Whole World Is Free" for HotNewHipHop, Paul wrote that the song "continues [OsamaSon's] impressive run in 2024".

=== Accolades ===
Publication	Accolade	Rank	Ref.
Complex	The 50 Best Albums of 2025	28	
HotNewHipHop	The 40 Best Rap Albums of 2025	25	
Paste	The 25 best rap albums of 2025	8	
Rolling Stone	The 100 Best Albums of 2025	66	
The Quietus	Albums of the Year 2025	22	

== Track listing ==
All tracks are written by Amari Middleton and William Minnix III and produced by OK, except where noted.

Standard edition track listing
No.	Title	Writer(s)	Producer(s)	Length
1.	"Southside"			2:12
2.	"Fool"			2:05
3.	"GTFO the Room"			2:20
4.	"Made Sum Plans"			2:07
5.	"Break da News"			1:39
6.	"Room 156"			1:53
7.	"Jumpout"	Middleton; Prosper Iloh	OsamaSon; Gyro	1:42
8.	"Going Dumbo"	Middleton; Keifa Carter; Warren Hunter	Legion; Warren Hunter	1:52
9.	"She Need a Ride"			1:44
10.	"New Tune"	Middleton; Johnny Peng	Skai	1:53
11.	"Waffle House"			1:48
12.	"I Got the Fye"			2:31
13.	"Insta"			2:32
14.	"Frontin"			2:16
15.	"Mufasa"			1:46
16.	"Ref"		Jay Trench	1:29
17.	"The Whole World Is Free"	Middleton; Minnix; Sonny Moore		1:44
18.	"Round of Applause"			1:57
Total length:				35:30

Deluxe edition track listing
No.	Title	Writer(s)	Producer(s)	Length
19.	"Logo" (bonus)	Middleton; Hunter	Hunter	2:16
20.	"Luv" (bonus)	Middleton; Carter	Legion	1:55
Total length:				39:41

Notes

- "Southside" is titled "C Note" in the CD and vinyl releases of the album.

Sample credits

- "The Whole World Is Free" contains a sample of "Scary Monsters and Nice Sprites", written by Sonny Moore and performed by Skrillex.
- "GTFO The Room", produced by OK, contains an uncredited sample of "Of Course We Ghetto Flowers", written by Symere Woods, Jamaal Henry, Jordan Carter and Kiari Cephus, and performed by Lil Uzi Vert, Playboi Carti and Offset.
- "Ref", produced by Jay Trench, contains an uncredited sample of "I Serve the Base", written by Nayvadius Wilburn and Leland Wayne, and performed by Future.

== Personnel ==
Credits adapted from the liner notes of Jump Out.

Production

- OsamaSon – songwriting, production (7)
- OK – songwriting (1–6, 9, 11–18), production (1–6, 9, 11–18), executive producer
- Gyro – songwriting (7), production (7)
- Legion – songwriting (8, 20), production (8, 20)
- Warren – songwriting (8, 19), production (8, 19)
- Skai – songwriting (10), production (10)
- Moustafa Moustafa – recording, mixing, mastering

Artwork

- Henry Tuori – art design

== Charts ==
Chart performance for Jump Out
Chart (2025)	Peak position
US Billboard 200	151

== Release history ==
Release dates and formats for Jump Out
Region	Date	Format(s)	Edition	Label	Ref.
Worldwide	January 24, 2025	LP; CD; digital download; streaming	Standard	Atlantic Records; Motion Music	
Worldwide	January 30, 2025	Digital download; streaming	Deluxe	Atlantic Records; Motion Music	
Los Angeles, California	January 30, 2025	LP (Note: The LP release features a limited edition liquid filled vinyl exclusively for ComplexCon 2026 which is hosted in Los Angeles, California.)	Standard	Atlantic Records	
