= Withdrawals (OsamaSon and Nettspend song) =

2024 single by OsamaSon and Nettspend

Single by OsamaSon and Nettspend
- Released: June 24, 2024
- Recorded: 2024
- Genre: Rage; trap
- Length: 2:17
- Label: Atlantic Records
- Songwriters: Gunner Shepardson; Amari Middleton; William Dale Minnix III
- Producer: OK

OsamaSon singles chronology
"Trenches" (2023)	"Withdrawals" (2024)	"Popstar" (2024)

Music video
- "Withdrawals" on YouTube

Withdrawals (stylized in lowercase) is a single by American rappers OsamaSon and Nettspend. Released on June 26, 2024, the track was released under Atlantic Records. "Withdrawals" is an alternative rap and rage song characterized by experimental production from OK. As the title suggests, the track is about suffering withdrawals from drug abuse. A music video for the track was released on June 26, 2024. Upon release, the track received critical acclaim from fans and critics for the synergy that the two bring to the track.

== Background and release ==
The American rappers OsamaSon and Nettspend first met in late 2023, and followed through with their first joint track together, titled "Wake Up", which was released on September 23, 2023. After collaborating, the two would depart on their own respective pathways and continued building names for themselves. The track would officially release on June 24, 2026.

== Composition ==
Coming in at a run time of two minutes and 17 seconds, the track's production is handled by OK, and the track's mastering and mixing is handled by Kasper Gem. Caroline Fisher of HotNewHipHop wrote how the track features energetic and experimental production. Maddie Gee of RapTV wrote that the track is "a wiry, off-kilter collab" between the two. Taye Rowland-Dixon of Verge Magazine wrote how the track has "catchy hooks with an accessible yet chaotic atmosphere."

== Critical and commercial reception ==
Upon release, the track received critical acclaim. John Norris of Paper wrote how the track is a "summertime stunner" which features the "aura prince" Nettspend. Dixon wrote that "Withdrawals" is a top 4 song from OsamaSon's discography, writing that the track's appeal comes from the duo's synergy, which fans seemed to adore. Additionally, the track was able to generate over two million streams in under six weeks, which helped push Nettspend to gain 500,000 monthly listeners on Spotify following the track's release. Jon Barlas of Our Generation Music compared the duo to XXXTentacion and Ski Mask The Slump God.

== Music video ==
On June 26, 2024, just two days after the track's release, a music video for the track was published. The video sees Nettspend and OsamaSon roam around with their crew, visit a liquor store, and eventually both land in the hospital, which all fit the theme of the song.
