= Nettspend =

American rapper (born 2007)

- Nettspend in 2024

Background information
- Also known as: Lil Nett; Nett; 6unner; 6unnex
- Born: Gunner Shepardson; March 18, 2007; Richmond, Virginia, U.S.
- Genres: Trap; rage; jerk
- Occupations: Rapper; songwriter
- Instrument: Vocals
- Works: Discography
- Years active: 2021–present
- Labels: Grade A; Interscope; Virgin
- Website: nettspend.io

Gunner Shepardson (born March 18, 2007), known professionally as Nettspend, is an American rapper from Richmond, Virginia. He is credited with the popularization of a more extreme and experimental version of rage music, alongside artists such as OsamaSon, and Che.

Nettspend began rapping while in fifth grade and began uploading to SoundCloud in October 2022. In 2023, Nettspend released his breakthrough single "Drankdrankdrank," which went viral across Twitter. Following a slew of releases and his rise to fame, Nettspend released his debut studio mixtape Bad Ass F*cking Kid in 2024. It became his first project to chart on the Billboard 200, debuting at number 198.

Nettspend released his debut studio album titled Early Life Crisis on February 13, 2026. It became his second project to chart on the Billboard 200, debuting at number 39. Shortly afterwards, Nettspend released a compilation album titled Him. It was released exclusively on SoundCloud on April 30 before it was released on all streaming platforms on July 3. On October 30, 2026, Nettspend released his debut commercial EP Virginia Creeper.

== Early life ==
Gunner Shepardson was born in Richmond, Virginia. He has three siblings, and his father was a country singer. Growing up, Shepardson listened to various artists such as Michael Jackson, Katy Perry, Justin Bieber, and was heavily inspired by rapper Future. During his childhood he was also very interested in skateboarding. He first tried out rapping while in fifth grade. Shepardson felt isolated in school and dropped out in ninth grade, citing the impact of the COVID-19 lockdowns.

== Career ==
=== 2022–2023: Career beginnings and breakthrough ===
Shepardson began releasing music to SoundCloud in October 2022. In 2023, rapper Zuro introduced Shepardson to New York rapper Xaviersobased. Following this, a snippet of his song "Drankdrankdrank" went viral on Twitter. Shepardson would briefly be associated with the digicore collective Novagang. His song "Shine N Peace" was listed among the best songs of 2023 by The Fader and The New York Times.

=== 2024: Bad Ass F*cking Kid ===
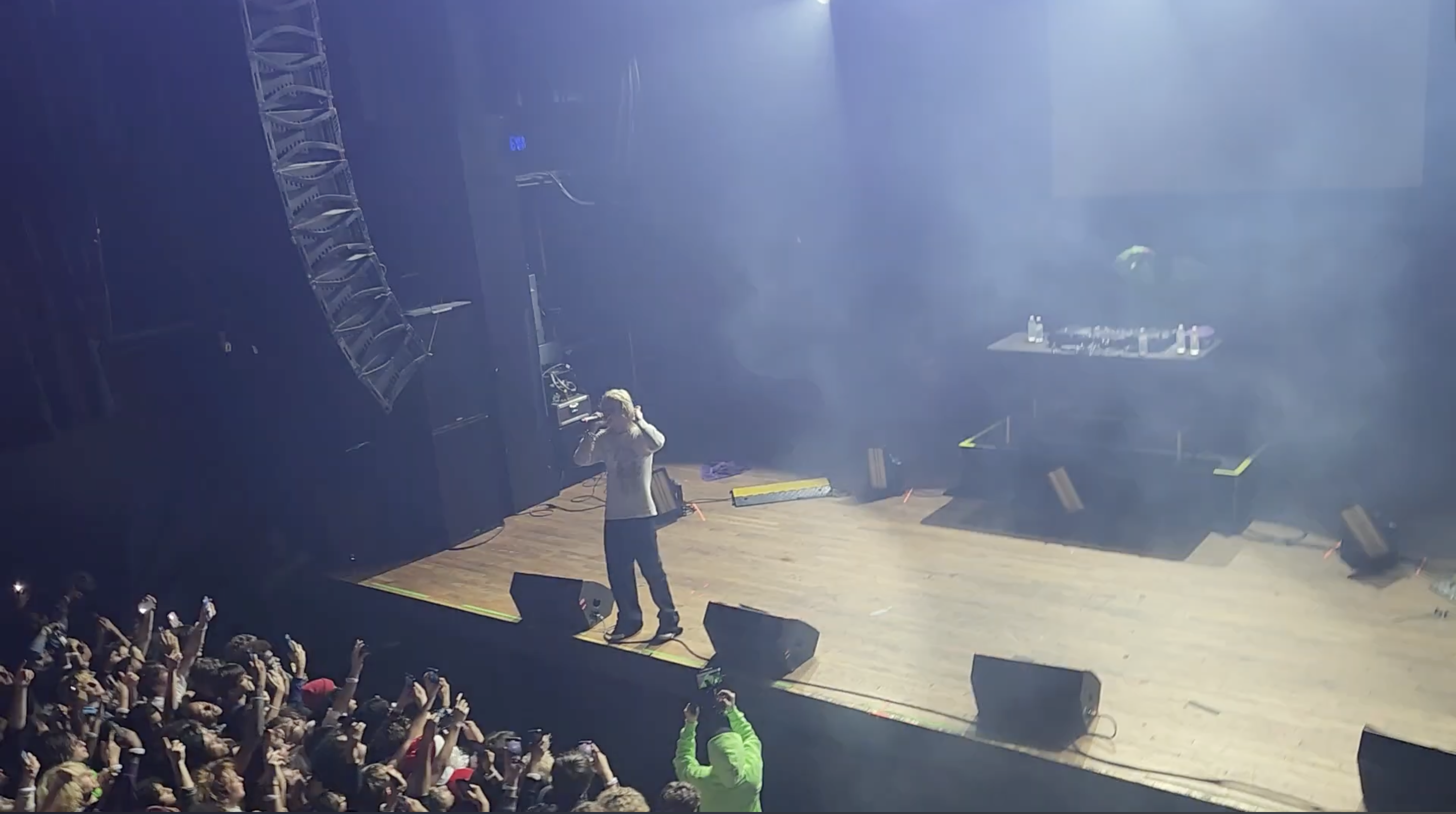
Shepardson performing at The Masquerade in 2024

On January 11, 2024, Shepardson was featured alongside rapper Xaviersobased on producer Evilgiane's song "40". The song was listed as one of the best songs of 2024 by The New York Times and Pitchfork. Shepardson performed at Rolling Loud on March 16, marking his first festival performance. In June, Shepardson collaborated with rapper OsamaSon on the single "Withdrawals". That month, he also made a cameo in the music video for "Devil Is a Lie" by fellow Virginia rapper Tommy Richman. After teasing it at multiple shows, Shepardson released "That One Song" in July, a song sampling "Entombed" by Deftones. In the weeks that followed, "That One Song", along with the majority of Nettspend's other popular songs, were removed from streaming platforms. On October 3, Shepardson released the track "F*ck Swag" alongside a music video directed by Cole Bennett. On December 6, Shepardson released his debut mixtape, Bad Ass F*cking Kid. He embarked on a promotional tour of the same name, bringing out British singer PinkPantheress at his Los Angeles show.

=== 2025–present: Early Life Crisis and further releases ===
On February 21, 2025, Shepardson announced his "Invert" tour on social media. Vans sponsored the tour and ran from March 14 to April 16. On March 11, Shepardson made his runway debut with Miu Miu on the last day of Paris Fashion Week alongside Cortisa Star. On March 18, Shepardson teamed up with Xaviersobased to release "Impact". On August 22, 2025, Nettspend released a two-track EP, titled Gone Too Soon, which featured tracks "Stressed" and "Her Friends". On October 28, 2025, Nettspend was featured in a holiday ad for Vans. On February 27, 2026, Nettspend announced that his debut album, Early Life Crisis, would be released on March 6, following a delay. Following the album's delay, Nettspend made his second runway with Gucci in Milan, Italy, alongside Fakemink. On March 6, Nettspend released Early Life Crisis. On April 30, Nettspend released a compilation album, titled Him, exclusively on SoundCloud. On June 13, during Summer Smash, Nettspend announced that a collaborative album with OsamaSon titled NXO was on the way. Him was officially released onto streaming platforms on July 3. His debut commercial EP Virginia Creeper, released on October 30, 2026. On November 4, 2026, Nettspend made a runway appearance for Kanye West's Yeezy Season 01 show in Los Angeles, California.

== Musical style and influences ==
Nettspend's musical style stems from trap, a subgenre of hip-hop. His music has also been characterized as jerk, a hip-hop subgenre which consists of "pitched-up, layered vocals and bass that will make your speakers sound broken", according to Pitchfork. Most of Shepardson's songs are under two minutes long. According to The Fader, he commonly employs "distorted 808s", "loose piano riffs", and "glimmering synths" in his music. His music has been described as "a symphony of stimuli" by i-D, and "post-post-rage" by The New York Times. Shepardson's lyrics frequently reference drug use, and his concert visuals have featured imagery referencing substances such as ketamine. His public image and lyrical themes led a member of his team to compare his appeal to "if Harry Styles had access to promethazine."

In an interview with i-D, Shepardson named Chief Keef, Lil Uzi Vert, Young Thug, Justin Bieber, Katy Perry, and Michael Jackson as influences.

== Discography ==
=== Studio albums ===
- Early Life Crisis (2026)
