= Grade A Productions =

American record label

- Founded: 2017; 9 years ago
- Founder: Lil Bibby; George "G-Money" Dickinson; Peter Jideonwo
- Genre: Emo Rap; Trap; Melodic Rap; Pop Rap; Drill; Plugg; Underground Rap
- Country of origin: United States
- Official website: gradealabel.org

Grade A Productions is an American record-label founded by rapper Lil Bibby, George "G-Money" Dickinson, and Peter Jideonwo in 2017. The label has signed rappers such as Juice Wrld, The Kid Laroi, Nettspend, and more.

Accusations have surfaced alleging the managers associated with Grade A Productions heavily push substance use on the artists

== Background ==
The label gained major recognition through its association with Juice WRLD, whose success in the late 2010s helped establish the label as a prominent company in hip hop. Juice WRLD's singles and albums were released in partnership with Interscope Records.

Grade A Productions has also worked with artists including The Kid Laroi and others connected to the emo rap and melodic hip hop scenes. The label is known for focusing on artist development, internet promotion, and collaborations with major record labels for distribution.

== Background on Lil Bibby ==
Brandon George Dickinson (born July 18, 1994), better known by his stage name Lil Bibby, is an American rapper, singer, and record executive. Beginning his career in 2011, Bibby released his debut mixtape, Free Crack in 2013. It was followed by two sequels—Free Crack 2 (2014) and Free Crack 3 (2015)—until he signed with Dr. Luke's Kemosabe Records, an imprint of RCA Records; however, he released no studio albums under the label.

== Roster ==
Act	Year signed	Releases	Notes
The Kid Laroi	2019	2 (1 extended play)	Jointly with Columbia; left Grade A's management on June 4, 2021, signing with manager Scooter Braun
Stunna Gambino	2021	1	Jointly with RCA
Zzz.	2022	1	Jointly with Warner
Rocco	2022	4 (Extended plays)	Jointly with Khalabo and Interscope
Screwly G	2024	1	Jointly with Geffen Records
Nettspend	2024	1	Jointly with Interscope

=== Former ===
==== Act ====	Year signed	Releases	Notes
Juice Wrld (deceased)	2018-2019	5 (3 posthumous)	Jointly with Interscope; died in December 2019
Clever	2019-2021	2 (1 extended play)	Jointly with Posty & Republic
Bloodhound Lil Jeff (deceased)	2023-2024	2 (2 posthumous)	Jointly with Create Music Group
Bloodhound Q50 (deceased)	2024-2026	2	Jointly with Signal Records

== Discography ==
Year	Album details	Details
2018	Juice Wrld – Goodbye & Good Riddance: Released: December 10, 2018; Label: Grade A Productions, Interscope Records; Formats: Vinyl, Streaming, Digital download	US Chart position: 4; RIAA certification: 5× Platinum
2019	Juice Wrld – Death Race for Love: Released: March 8, 2019; Label: Grade A Productions, Interscope Records; Formats: Vinyl, CD, Streaming, Digital download	Chart position: 1; RIAA certification: 2× Platinum
2019	Clever – Who is Clever?: Released: October 11, 2019; Label: Grade A Productions, The Dispensary; Formats: Streaming, Digital download	Chart position: N/A; RIAA certification: Uncertified
2020	Seezyn – Tis: Released: January 30, 2020; Label: Kult Life Records, Grade A Productions; Formats: Streaming, Digital download	Chart position: N/A; RIAA certification: Uncertified
2020	The Kid Laroi – F*ck Love: Released: July 24, 2020; Label: Grade A Productions, Columbia Records; Formats: Vinyl, Streaming, Digital download	Chart position: 1; RIAA certification: Platinum
2020	Juice Wrld – Legends Never Die: Released: July 10, 2020; Label: Grade A Productions, Interscope Records; Formats: Vinyl, CD, Streaming, Digital download	Chart position: 1; RIAA certification: 2× Platinum
2021	Clever – Crazy: Released: March 12, 2021; Label: Grade A Productions, Republic Records; Formats: Streaming, Digital download	Chart position: 1; RIAA certification: Uncertified
2021	Juice Wrld – Fighting Demons: Released: December 10, 2021; Label: Grade A Productions, Interscope Records; Formats: Vinyl, CD, Streaming, Digital download	Chart position: 2; RIAA certification: Gold
2024	Bloodhound Lil Jeff – Stepping In Blood: Released: June 26, 2024; Label: Grade A Productions, Create Music Group; Formats: Streaming, Digital download	
2024	Juice Wrld – The Party Never Ends: Released: November 29, 2024; Label: Grade A Productions, Interscope Records; Formats: Vinyl, CD, Streaming, Digital download	Chart position: 4
2024	Nettspend – Bad Ass F*cking Kid: Released: December 6, 2024; Label: Grade A Productions, Interscope Records; Formats: Streaming, Digital download	Chart position: 197
2025	Bloodhound Lil Jeff – Bloody Bruddas: Released: January 1, 2025; Label: Grade A Productions, Create Music Group; Formats: Streaming, Digital download	
2025	Bloodhound Q50 – Long Live My Brudda He Prolly Kilt Yo Brudda: Released: April 2, 2025; Label: Grade A Productions, Signal Records; Formats: Streaming, Digital download	
2026	Nettspend - Early Life Crisis: Released: March 6, 2026; Label: Grade A Productions, Interscope Records; Format: Streaming, CD, Digital download	Chart position: 33
