= OsamaSon =

American rapper (born 2003)

- OsamaSon in 2024

Background information
- Also known as: Lil O; Damn 4K; PradaUMari; Big O
- Born: Amari Deshawn Adham Middleton; May 20, 2003 (age 23); Columbus, Ohio, U.S.
- Origin: Goose Creek, South Carolina, U.S.
- Genres: Rage; dark plugg (early); trap
- Occupations: Rapper; songwriter; record producer
- Instrument: Vocals
- Works: Discography
- Years active: 2020–present
- Labels: Motion; Atlantic
- Member of: Slime Krew
- Website: osamason.com

Amari Deshawn Adham Middleton (born May 20, 2003), known professionally as OsamaSon, is an American rapper, songwriter and record producer. A member of the 2020s underground rap scene, he rose to prominence with his singles "Cts-V" and "Troops", which gained traction online in early 2023. That same year, he released his debut mixtape, Osama Season, and his debut studio album, Flex Musix. In 2025, he released two studio albums, Jump Out and Psykotic, both of which entered the Billboard 200.

== Early life ==
Amari Middleton was born on May 20, 2003 and raised in Goose Creek, South Carolina, and Columbus, Ohio. His uncle, a geechee musician, taught him how to produce music using FL Studio. In high school, he began producing instrumentals influenced by musicians such as Chief Keef, NLE Choppa, Summrs, and Kankan under the name Damn 4K. Middleton attended Goose Creek High School, where played football in his freshman year and played on the basketball team until his sophomore year. He graduated from Goose Creek in 2021.

== Career ==
=== 2020–2023: Career beginnings and breakthrough ===
OsamaSon began making music in 2020 under the name PradaUMari. By 2021, he adopted his current stage name and released the mixtapes Vengeance and Carnival. In early 2023, the collaborative projects Osamavrt and 2 Slime preceded the release of the EP Bad Habits. On April 7, OsamaSon's breakout single, "Cts-V", was released and began gaining traction online. His music was further popularized by Internet personalities such as BruceDropEmOff, who played OsamaSon's songs on his live streams.

=== 2023–2024: Osama Season and Flex Musix ===
On June 2, 2023, OsamaSon released "Troops", the lead single from his debut mixtape, Osama Season; like "Cts-V". Osama Season itself was released on July 21, with music critics for Pitchfork and the Fader highlighting the tracks "Werkin", "Kutta", "Summer Sixteen", "Anti", and "X & Sex" as standouts from the album. In October, he embarked on the Next Gen Tour alongside fellow rappers Kankan, Summrs, Highway, and the producer F1lthy. OsamaSon released his debut studio album, Flex Musix, on December 8.

On February 16, 2024, OsamaSon released Flxtra, the six track deluxe edition of Flex Musix. On February 18, he kicked off the Flex Musix Tour, his first as headliner; the tour concluded with a performance at Rolling Loud California on March 16. In May 2024, he released 3vil Reflection, a collaborative album with Glokk40Spaz. On November 5, 2024, OsamaSon embarked on the Wish You Were Here Tour spanning across Canada, London, and Thailand. The tour concluded at Rolling Loud Thailand on November 22, 2024.

=== 2025–present: Jump Out and Psykotic ===
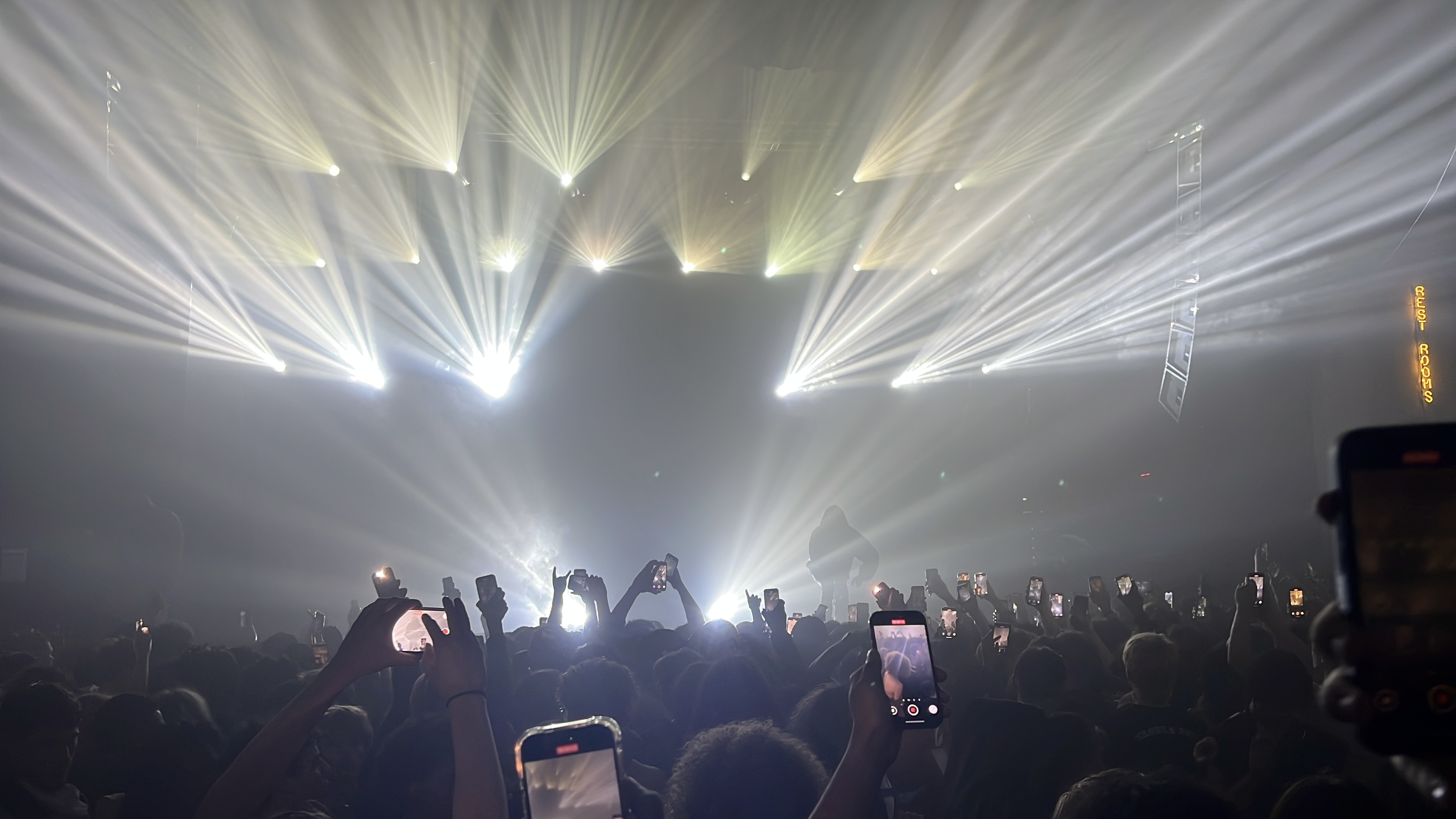
OsamaSon performing at the Majestic Theatre on April 13, 2025 as part of the Jump Out tour.

On January 24, 2025, OsamaSon released his third studio album, Jump Out, to critical acclaim from publications like Pitchfork. A deluxe version of Jump Out featuring two extra songs was released 4 days later on the 28th, and the album was his first to chart on the Billboard 200, peaking at number 151 on February 8. OsamaSon embarked on a tour in support of the album from March to May. Later in the year, he began teasing a new project titled Psykotic, which became his third studio album. On August 20, 2025, OsamaSon announced The Psykotic Tour, accompanying the album. The tour began on October 16, 2025, in St. Louis, and ended on December 20, 2025, in Vancouver.

Following the tour announcement, OsamaSon released the official track list for Psykotic on October 2. Five days later, on October 7, 2025, RapCaviar collaborated with Osama’s alternate Instagram account on a post featuring a picture of a CD announcing the release date to be on Friday, October 10. On that date, OsamaSon released the album, which features seventeen tracks and one feature from the rapper, Che. In May 2026, LiveNation announced Osamason's Psykturnal Tour, with nine dates across Europe and three dates in Australia. On May 20, 2026, his 23rd birthday, OsamaSon released "Off That!", rumored to be the lead single of his rumored upcoming album Nocturnal. On August 26, 2026, OsamaSon was featured on the track "Vamp City" alongside Ken Carson off his reissue Cartunez.

== Artistry ==
OsamaSon has been compared to a number of his contemporaries, including Chief Keef, Playboi Carti, Destroy Lonely, Ken Carson, Future, and the late Speaker Knockerz. He is known for his experimental sound—dubbed "maximalist rage" by the Fader's Vivian Medithi—which is characterized by a heavy usage of bass and synths; his musical style was described as "woozy, discombobulating, and sometimes suffocatingly layered" by Leor Galil of the Chicago Reader. OsamaSon has said the biggest influences on his music are Duwap Kaine, Speaker Knockerz, and Lil B.

== Personal life ==
The name OsamaSon is derived from his father's name, Osama. OsamaSon has also dabbled in the modeling industry, with him landing a Balenciaga campaign for the summer of 2026.

=== Performance incidents ===
On November 19, 2026, at the Terminal 5 venue in New York City, OsamaSon's concert became overcrowded. It was reported by music publication The Fader that around 8:20 PM, fans began stepping out due to breathability issues. While the issue was a prominent setback, the crowd crush didn't emerge until later when OsamaSon's DJ reportedly told fans to "rush to the music booth" for exclusive merch, later leading to the crushing incident that ended with four people having minor injuries. Further information was released revealing that a girl had broken her ankle while others began passing out. Following the incident, nobody from the NYPD or OsamaSon's team had spoken on the event. However, OsamaSon's DJ, Nino Andretti, received backlash online from fans, who blamed Andretti for being the catalyst of the issue. Fans negatively described the concert's setting as a terrible situation.

== Discography ==
Studio albums

- Flex Musix (2023)
- Jump Out (2025)
- Psykotic (2025)
- Nocturnal (2026)

== Tours ==
=== Headlining ===
- Flex Musix Tour (2024)
- Wish You Were Here Tour (with 1oneam) (2024) (Later renamed to Going Dumbo Tour)
- Going Dumbo Tour (2024)
- Jump Out Tour (with 1oneam and ohsxnta) (2025)
- Psykotic Tour (2025)

=== Co-headlining ===
- Next Gen Tour (with Kankan, Summrs, F1lthy, and Highway) (2023) (Cancelled)
