= Che discography =

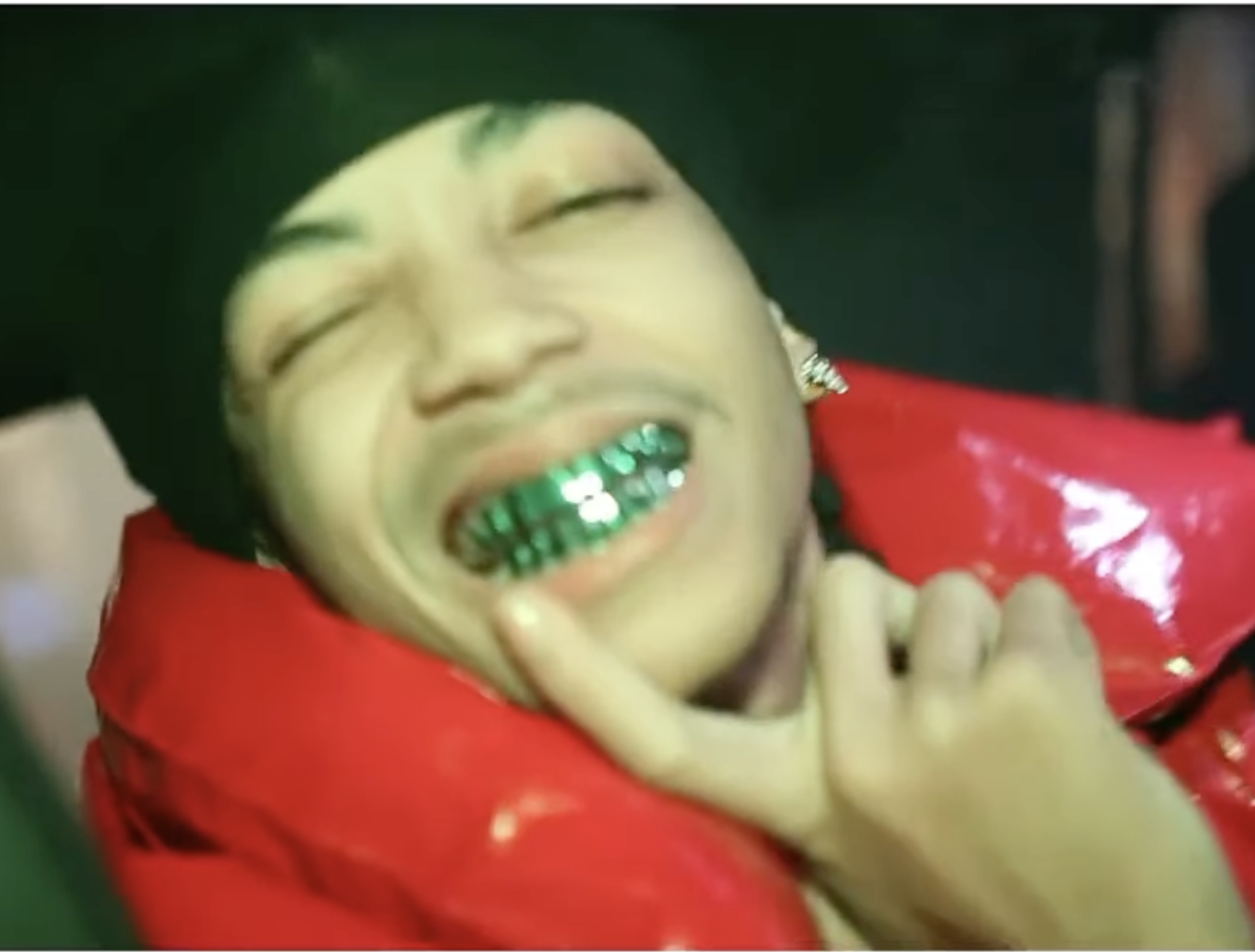
- Studio albums: 2
- EPs: 6
- Singles: 27
- Mixtape: 1

American rapper Che's discography consists of 2 studio albums, 1 mixtape, 6 EPs and 27 singles.

== Studio albums ==
Title	Album details
Sayso Says	Released: August 30, 2024; Label: 10K Projects; Format: Digital download, streaming
Rest in Bass	Released: July 18, 2025; Label: 10K Projects; Format: LP, digital download, streaming

== Mixtapes ==
Title	Album details
Closed Captions	Released: July 21, 2023; Label: Self-released; Format: Digital download, streaming

== Extended plays ==
Title	Album details
3	Released: May 1, 2022; Label: Self-released; Format: Digital download, streaming
Crueger	Released: October 31, 2023; Label: 10K Projects; Format: Digital download, streaming
Fully Loaded	Released: March 27, 2026; Label: 10K Projects; Format: Digital download, streaming
Para'dies	Released: April 24, 2026; Label: 10K Projects; Format: Digital download, streaming
Empty Clip	Released: June 19, 2026; Label: 10K Projects; Format: Digital download, streaming
RichPhønks (with Tezzus)	Released: September 25, 2026; Label: Young Stoner Life; Format: Digital download, streaming

== Singles ==
Title	Year	Album
"Kind"	2021	Non-album singles
"#Reside"	2021	Non-album singles
"#Hundred"	2021	Non-album singles
"Agenda"	2021	Non-album singles
"The Final Agenda"	2022	Non-album singles
"Euphoria" (featuring Specxfic)	2022	Non-album singles
"WTF"	2022	Non-album singles
"Feel" (featuring Jssr)	2022	Non-album singles
"Intro"	2022	Non-album singles
"Blac Chyna"	2023	Closed Captions
"Bluberry Bakwood"	2023	Closed Captions
"Dough" (with CXO, featuring Slump6s & OsamaSon)	2023	Non-album singles
"Japan"	2023	Before Crueger
"Tony Tony"	2023	Before Crueger
"Paint" (with DJ Phat)	2023	Non-album singles
"Bae"	2024	Non-album singles
"Miley Cyrus"	2024	Non-album singles
"Pizza Time"	2024	Non-album singles
"666" (with CXO, featuring Sematary)	2024	Non-album singles
"Kiss" (with CXO)	2025	Non-album singles
"Pose for the Pic"	2025	Non-album singles
"Love (MKB)"	2025	Non-album singles
"Green Day"	2025	Non-album singles
"Million Dollar Mansion"	2026	Fully Loaded
"Promoting Violence"	2026	Fully Loaded
"KickAss (Pull Up Pls)" (with Nettspend)	2026	Non-album singles
