= N0rth4evr =

2026 EP by North West

EP by North West
- Released: May 1, 2026
- Genres: Rage; emo; hyperpop; alternative metal
- Length: 11:23
- Languages: English; Japanese
- Label: Gamma
- Producer: North West

N0rth4evr is the debut extended play by the American musician North West. It was released on May 1, 2026, through media company Gamma. Announced two days before its release, it is a rage, emo, hyperpop, and alternative metal EP consisting of six tracks that depict West's perspective as a celebrity child through fame, boasting, and isolation. Preceding its release, West collaborated with FKA Twigs and her father, Kanye West, produced tracks for Mag!c, Lil Novi and Skaiwater, and released her debut solo single, "Piercing on My Hand".

In promotion of the EP, West released a music video for the title track, opened a pop-up exhibition for two days, and made her debut solo performance at Lyrical Lemonade's Summer Smash festival in Chicago. A co-headlining tour with Molly Santana was set to take place in August 2026, but was cancelled a few days before it began. The music video for "Aishite (愛して)" was released shortly after its cancellation. The following month, West performed her first headlining concert at The Vic Theatre in Chicago. N0rth4evr received mixed-to-positive reviews from music critics who complimented her distinct artistic identity, dense production, and narrative perspective as a celebrity child.

== Background ==
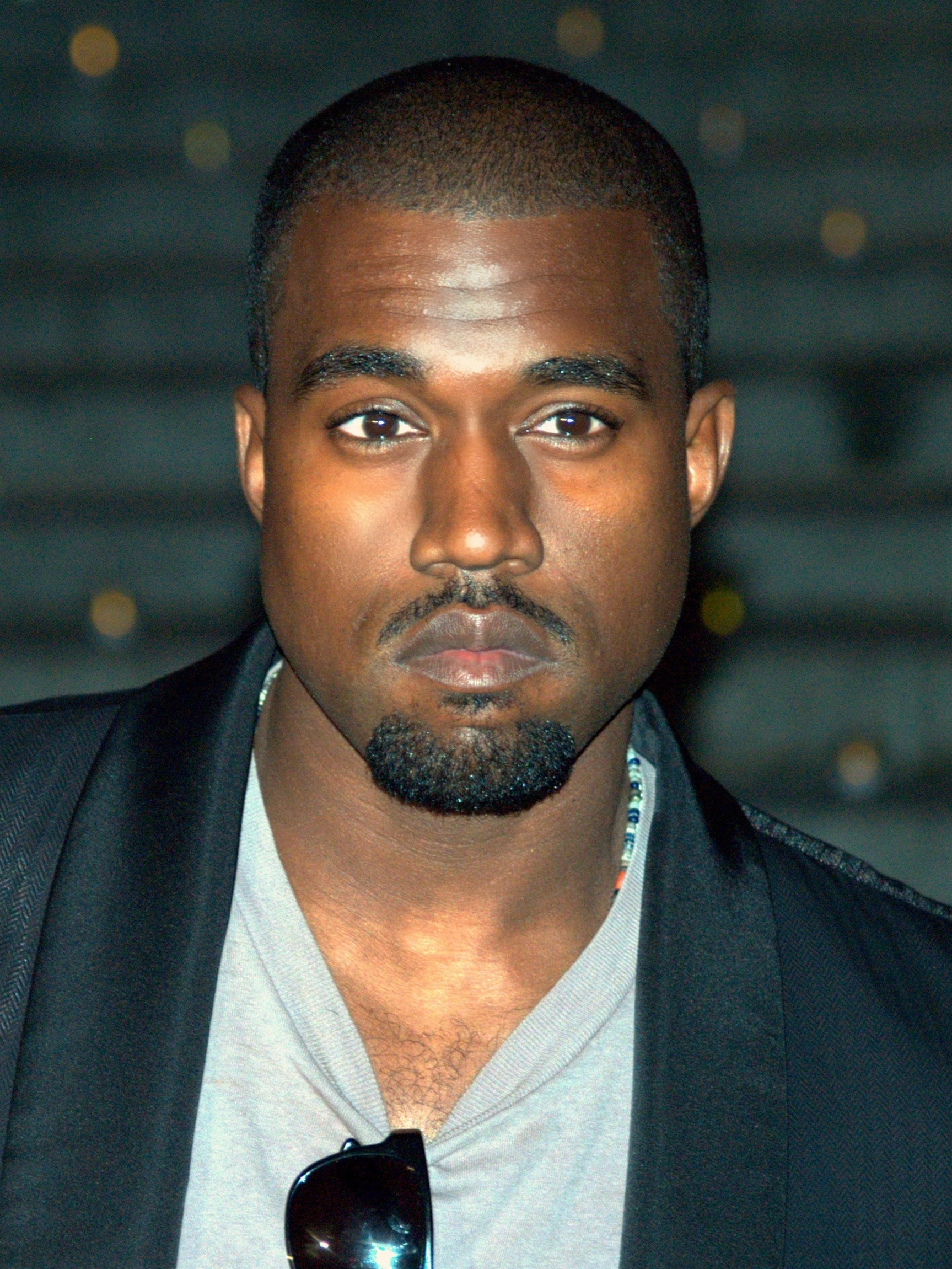
West collaborated and performed with her father Kanye West multiple times in the first few years of her music career.

North West is the eldest child of rapper and record producer Kanye West and media personality Kim Kardashian. She began her music career with a guest verse on ¥$'s (comprising Kanye and Ty Dolla Sign) single "Talking / Once Again", which was later included on the group's album Vultures 1 in February 2024. The following month, West announced her debut album Elementary School Dropout, which remained unreleased as of June 2026. In April, she co-directed and wrote the music video for "Talking / Once Again".

In August 2024, North and her sister Chicago were featured on "Bomb" from ¥$'s album Vultures 2, in which North rapped in Japanese. She later contributed a rap verse in Japanese to "Childlike Things" from FKA Twigs's album Eusexua in January 2025. In March, she appeared alongside Jasmine Williams, King Combs, and Sean Combs on her father's track, "Lonely Roads Still Go to Sunshine", which was uploaded to X and received criticism from multiple publications. The song was released as "Lonely Roads" from King Combs's EP Never Stop three months later with Kanye serving as its executive producer.

On January 2, 2026, West received her first production credit by producing rapper Mag!c's track "Justswagup" with a guest feature from Lil Novi, Lil Wayne's son. On January 30, West previewed a song titled "Piercing On My Hand" during Kanye's performance in Mexico City. After signing to media company Gamma, West released the song as her debut solo single on February 5. That month, she produced "Blink Twice" from Skaiwater's album Wonderful. On April 1 and 3, West performed "Piercing On My Hand" alongside "Talking" during Kanye's two SoFi Stadium performances. On May 1, the release day of N0rth4evr, she was featured on "So Let's Have Some Fun" from Edward Skeletrix's album Body of Work.

== Composition ==
=== Overview ===
N0rth4evr is a rage, emo, hyperpop, and alternative metal EP with elements of Jersey club and punk rock. A six-track EP with a running time of eleven minutes, it features maximalist production, "buzzing" synthesizers, and hints of electric guitar. Tracks from the EP open with a Japanese producer tag that says "ノースちゃん (North-chan)". Dazed described N0rth4evr as emphasizing "Carti-inspired maximalism" with Jersey club bass line melodies and pluggnb influences and compared its individual track names to Roblox usernames and Discord chats, while Complex considered it to be a blend of metal guitar riffs, autotune, and punk rap. West produced and co-wrote all of the tracks on N0rth4evr.

=== Tracks ===
"#N0rth4evr"
The title track contains a nu-metal influence with similarities to musicians Slayr and Ezcodylee.

The EP opens with "How Should I Feel", a track that features a sample from Meg & Dia's "Monster" (2006), especially the chorus "Monster, how should I feel? / Creatures lie here, looking through the window". The Jersey club-styled track emphasizes West's vulnerability using metaphoric lyrics from "All this money turn my heart to a black hole" to "In the back of the Lamb', it get lonely". "Die" opens with a sample of JudyPhonic's trance-based chorus from "Shinitai-chan" before evolving into maximalist production as West boasts lyrically. The title track, "North4evr", is described by Vivian Medithi of The Fader as a nu-metal-influenced track that collapses into a "grandiose, Travis Scott-esque breakdown." The reviewer also compared the song to Slayr's "Flashout Freestyle" (2025) and punk-rage musician Ezcodylee.

According to Dazed, "This Time" swings into a "thumping club beat" while looping a sample of singer Social Repose's rock-based cover of Mumford & Sons' "Little Lion Man" (2009). With Jeff Ihaza of Rolling Stone considering it to bring the EP's "emo sensibility into focus", the track is described as revolving around a post-punk beat coated in hyperpop influences. "Woah" is lyrically based on West's worldview with an inherited celebrity lifestyle over crunching basslines while sampling the Swedish group Caramell. On the track, West raps that she has been "signing autographs since elementary". The closing track, "Aishite (愛して)", takes inspiration from Vocaloid reminiscent of Hatsune Miku while sampling Japanese musician Kikuo's "Love Me, Love Me, Love Me" (2015), folding its chorus into the production. Anthony Fantano of The Needle Drop considered it to be the darkest track on the EP, as West makes references to feeling betrayed by others. Lyrically, West describes her isolation resulting from inherited fame, as she sings "Can't be no one's friend, I can't let nobody in" on a drumless hook.

== Promotion and release ==
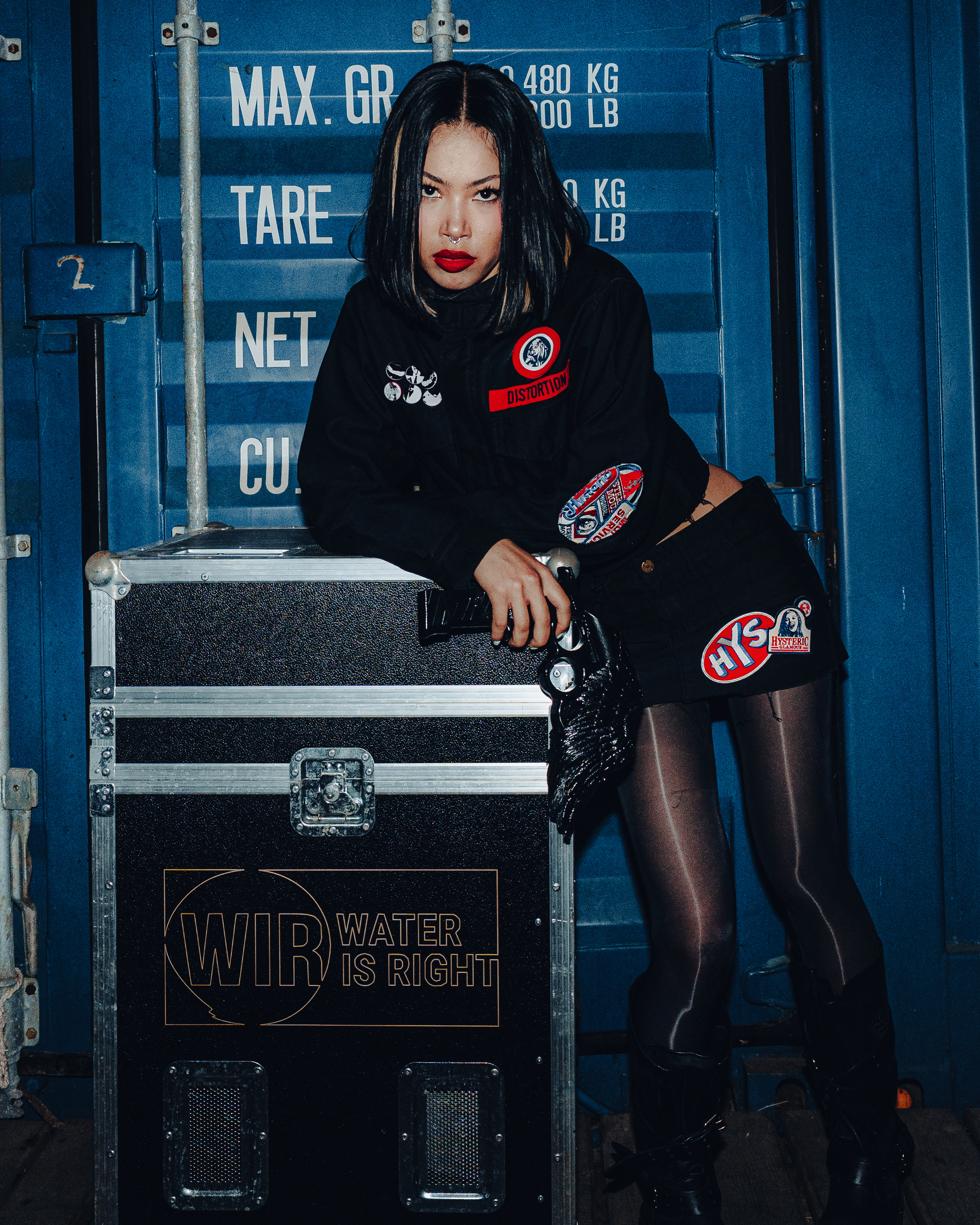
West and Molly Santana (pictured) were scheduled to co-headline the Kimokawaii Tour prior to its cancellation.

On April 29, 2026, West announced N0rth4evr, subsequently releasing the music video for the EP's title track the following day. Directed by Ty Akimoto and Mack Ishida, the music video features her dressed in early-2000s emo and punk attire with "striped arm sleeves, spiked wrist cuffs, and Converse sneakers", and includes a shot of an iPod. The same day, she announced a pop-up exhibition with Complex on May 1 and 2. The exhibition was set up with "immersive visuals", an ice cream stand, and limited-edition merchandise. Kanye and Bianca Censori attended the pop-up exhibition on its first day, where he took pictures and signed merchandise for fans. Kim Kardashian attended the event the following day.

Just before the release of N0rth4evr, West released merchandise supporting the EP on the website n0rth4evr.shop, including vinyl (regular and multi-colored) and CD prints, T-shirts, a layered long-sleeve shirt, keychain, arm warmers, spike bracelet, key necklace, sticker pack, journal, and faux fur hat. On May 1, 2026, N0rth4evr was released to streaming services through Gamma. On its release, The Source praised it as a "major milestone" for West, who was twelve years old at the time. Upon its release, West received support from several members of the Kardashian family, including Rob and Khloé Kardashian and Kris Jenner, who posted pictures of themselves listening to the EP on Instagram.

On June 12, 2026, West made her debut solo performance at Lyrical Lemonade's Summer Smash festival in Chicago, where she performed tracks from the EP. The performance lasted fifteen minutes, with Lil Novi making an appearance to perform the West-produced "Mula tha Root of All Evil". Kanye shared support for her appearance by reposting a clip of West performing "Talking" on his Instagram Stories. On June 16, West and fellow rage artist Molly Santana announced a co-headlining tour titled the Kimokawaii Tour, which was set to begin on August 5 in Dallas and set to conclude on August 27 in Los Angeles. However, the tour was cancelled on July 31, a few days before it was set to begin, for undisclosed reasons.

On August 7, 2026, West released the music video for "Aishite (愛して)", which features her in an abandoned school and an arcade. The music video is based on eerie visuals reminiscent of a "horror anime series, with blood dripping down the screen throughout the video." The same day, West made a guest appearance at Kanye's Portugal concert, where she performed "How Should I Feel". On August 24, she participated in an interview with Marios Mystidis of Dazed, where West revealed that she was "currently obsessed with" rehearsing every day, and that she uses prayer as a pre-show ritual. On August 28, she announced a one-night concert at the Vic Theatre in Chicago, which took place on September 5.

== Critical reception ==
Professional ratings
Review scores
Source	Rating
The Needle Drop	6/10 (Note: Specifically, Fantano rated the EP a "strong 5 to a light 6".)
Rolling Stone	4/5 stars

N0rth4evr received mixed-to-positive reviews from music critics. Jeff Ihaza of Rolling Stone complimented the EP as a brief but impactful project in which West transforms her public lifestyle into creative material, establishing a distinct artistic identity and personal mythology. Vivian Medithi of The Fader described the EP as finding "wild beauty in the chaos of growing up", but commented that it leans too heavily on her privileged background. While acknowledging her access to many resources and industry connections shapes N0rth4evr, Medithi suggests that they are used "in service of worldbuilding." Anthony Fantano of The Needle Drop presented a more critical approach, commenting that while multiple aspects of the EP feel underdeveloped, West's artistry brought her ahead at a young age, and that the "early moment in her career" would leave areas for potential and growth.

== Track listing ==
No.	Title	Writer(s)	Length
1.	"How Should I Feel"	North West; Will Frenchman; Ruby Mitchelle; Dia Frampton; Meg Frampton	1:55
2.	"Die"	West; Frenchman; Mitchelle; Esther Conteh; Juliet Simmons; Switch	2:04
3.	"North4evr"	West; Frenchman; Mitchelle; Garrett Podgorski	1:43
4.	"This Time"	West; Frenchman; Mitchelle; Edward Dwayne; Benjamin Lovett; Winston Marshall; Marcus Mumford	1:57
5.	"Woah"	West; Frenchman; Mitchelle; Juha Myllylä; Jorge Vasconcelo	1:39
6.	"Aishite (愛して)" (transl. "Love Me")	West; Frenchman; Mitchelle	2:05
Total length:			11:23

=== Notes ===
- "How Should I Feel" is stylized as "H0w Sh0uld ! F33l".
- "Die" is stylized as "D!e".
- "North4evr" is stylized as "#N0rth4evr".
- "This Time" is stylized as "Th!s T!m3".
- "Woah" is stylized as "W0ah".

== Personnel ==
Credits are adapted from Tidal.

- North West – vocals, production
- Will Frenchman – programming, recording (all tracks); mixing (4, 6)
- Colin Leonard – mastering
- Jacob Richards – assistant mixing
- Landon Rime – assistant mixing and assistant recording
- Jaycen Joshua – mixing (1–3, 5)
- Garrett Podgorski – lead guitar (1, 3, 5–6)
- Michael Hernandez – assistant recording (1, 3–5)
- Josh Sage – assistant recording (2)
- Juliet Simmons – vocals (2)
