= Avant Nova =

EP by Slayr
- Released: July 10, 2026
- Genres: Rage; digicore; pop rap; EDM
- Length: 16:33
- Label: Columbia
- Producers: Chris Marek; M8i; Nxah; Slayr; VVSPipes

Slayr chronology
Half Blood (Bloodluxe) (2026)	Avant Nova (2026)	Fabula Nova (2026)

Avant Nova is the eighth extended play (EP) by American rapper Slayr, released on July 10, 2026. It serves as his first release under Columbia Records, the follow-up to BloodLuxe (2026), and as the precursor to his upcoming album, Fabula Nova. The EP contains a guest feature from Prettifun.

Avant Nova is a six-track EP that blends digicore and rage and expands on the sounds Slayr previously used on his album Half Blood. Upon release, the EP generated positive reception, with music critics from HotNewHipHop and laut.de praising its production and Slayr's performances.

== Background ==
After Slayr announced Fabula Nova on X, he performed at both Rolling Loud and Summer Smash in Orlando and Chicago, respectively. On June 28, 2026, Slayr announced Avant Nova, originally titling it Prior Nova before changing it to its current name a few days later. Slayr announced the release date on July 6, 2026, and the track list the next day.

The song "I Got Taste" contains lyrics from a freestyle that was performed for XXL before the release of Avant Nova.

== Composition ==
=== Overview ===
Avant Nova is a six-track EP that blends the style of digicore and rage. It serves as the precursor to his second studio album Fabula Nova. Sonically, the EP features melodic and noisy production, with Alexander Cole of HotNewHipHop writing how his sound is firmly within the underground meta. Lyrically, the tracks see Slayr incorporate a flow similar to that of Lil Uzi Vert.

=== Songs ===
The EP starts with "Promise", a song that contains vocal chop elements from Underscores' track "The Peace" off her album U. Lyrically, the track sees Slayr thanking Underscores for clearing the sample, where he raps: "Shoutout April for the sample, we should do some more". Zabih Safdari of laut.de wrote called it Slayr's version of Leroy's project Grave Robbing. "Switch My Swag" comes right after, which has a feature from Prettifun. According to Safdari, he praises the duo's chemistry combination, writing how Prettifun's verse even slightly overshadows Slayr's, he even labeled the track as a "fun" one off the EP. On "Nova", Slayr dives into the rage aspect of the EP, where he raps over a fried and distorted instrumental. Nearing the end of the track, he samples a video clip and makes it clear that he's able to rap on rage instrumentals with the ending going as: " Aha, y'all thought slayr could only do that EDM shit? / Nah, they don't even know what's 'bout to happen, bruh."

Shifting over to "I Got Taste", Slayr keeps up with the rage momentum and sees him unleash his most dynamic flows according to Safdari. Additionally, the track is also an extended version of his XXL Freshman freestyle. Sonically, the production stays similar as the previous track, with music critic Anthony Fantano calling it more "grim" than "Nova". It features siren synthesizers and "chunky blown out metal rips." Vocally, Slayr features a rapid flow which is reminiscent to that of Lil Uzi Vert, he then turns on a deep voice which both Fantano and Safdari compared that to of Cookie Monster; Safdari also compared it to Che's track "Promoting Violence" off his EP Fully Loaded. Safdari labeled the track as Slayr's most "ambitious rap performance" as of yet. Shifting to "Having Anxiety Is Annoying", the song dives away from rage and goes back to a more melodic digicore sound. Nearing the end of the track, it features an EDM drop which Fantano praises. The outro "Raise My Voice" features two contrasting halves sonically and lyricallym which Fantano dubbed as a "strong finish" to the EP.

== Reception ==
Professional ratings
Review scores
Source	Rating
TheNeedleDrop	8/10 (Note: Specifically, Fantano rated it a "strong 7 to a light 8".)
laut.de	4/5 stars

Avant Nova received positive reception from music critics. HipHopDrops's Hattie Lindert said it "Hits like the pre-game signal before the whole arena lights up with those digicore beats that twist and turn through experimental soundscapes full of wild vocal chops that will keep your speakers glitching in the best way". Alexander Cole from HotNewHipHop had described the EP as "another step forward" for Slayr, who is "on the verge of mainstream superstardom".

In a review for laut.de, Zabih Safdari rated the project a four out of five, writing that the project is worth a listen despite being shorter and less quality-like compared to Slayr's latter project. He praises Slayr's rapping ability, the refreshing digicore production throughout the project, and the Prettifun feature, which he labeled as a "fun" piece throughout the project. Fantano rated the project an eight out of ten, stating that the consistency, quality, and vision that Slayr put into the EP make it a standout and one of Fantano's favorite EP's of the year.

== Track listing ==
Avant Nova track list
No.	Title	Writer(s)	Producer(s)	Length
1.	"Promise"	Evan McDonald; Chris Marek; April Harper Grey	Slayr; Marek	2:47
2.	"Switch My Swag" (with Prettifun)	E. McDonald; Michael Pieper; Noah McDonald	Slayr; Nxah; VVSPipes	2:58
3.	"Nova"	E. McDonald; M8i	Slayr; M8i	2:41
4.	"I Got Taste"	E. McDonald; Marek	Slayr; Marek	2:22
5.	"Having Anxiety Is Annoying"	E. McDonald; N. McDonald	Slayr; Nxah	2:36
6.	"Raise My Voice"	E. McDonald; Marek	Slayr; Marek	3:07
Total length:				16:33

=== Notes ===
- All track titles are stylized in all lowercase
- "Promise" contains elements from "The Peace" (2026), as written and performed by Underscores.

== Personnel ==
Credits are adapted from Tidal.

Production

- Slayr – vocals, engineering, mixing, mastering, producer (1–6)
- Prettifun – vocals (2)
- Nxah – producer (2, 5)
- Chris Marek – producer (1, 4, 6)
- VVSPipes – producer (2)

Artwork

- Hunnigarden – art design
