= Hellraiser (disambiguation) =

Hellraiser is a 1987 British horror film.

Hellraiser or Hell Raiser may also refer to:

== Franchise ==
- Hellraiser (franchise), comprising the 1987 film, its sequels, print media, and merchandise
- Hellraiser (2022 film), the eleventh film in the franchise
  - Hellraiser (soundtrack), a soundtrack album for the 2022 film

== Music ==
- Hellraiser Series, a line of guitars manufactured by Schecter Guitar Research
- Hellraiser (album) or the title song, by Krokus, 2006
- Hellraiser: Best of the Epic Years, an album by Motörhead, 2003
- "Hellraiser" (song), a song written by Ozzy Osbourne, Zakk Wylde, and Lemmy; recorded by Osbourne (1991) and Motörhead (1992)
- "Hellraiser" (Che song), by Che, from the album Rest in Bass, 2026
- "Hellraiser", a song by The Beatnuts from The Beatnuts: Street Level, 1994
- "Hellraiser", a song by Entombed from Hollowman, 1993
- "Hell Raiser", a song by Suicide Commando from Mindstrip, 2000
- "Hell Raiser", a song by Sweet from The Sweet, 1973

== Professional wrestling ==
- The Hell Raisers, a 1992–1995 incarnation of The Road Warriors, a tag team
- Jerry Tuite (1966–2003), nicknamed Hell Raiser, American professional wrestler

== See also ==
- Hell Razah (born 1976), American rapper
- Hellblazer, a horror comic book series that was originally to have been called Hellraiser
