= Funhouse (disambiguation) =

A funhouse is a type of amusement facility.

Fun House, Funhouse, The Fun House, or The Funhouse may also refer to:

== Film and television ==
=== Film ===
- Fun House (film), 2016 American war film
- The Funhouse, a 1981 horror film directed by Tobe Hooper
- Funhouse (2019 film), a horror film starring Valter Skarsgård

=== TV ===
- Andy's Funhouse, a 1970s television special/pilot
- Fun House (American game show), an American children's television game show
- Fun House (British game show), a British children's television game show based on the US game show
- "The Funhouse", a 1985 episode of the cartoon G.I. Joe: A Real American Hero
- "Funhouse" (CSI: Vegas), a 2021 episode
- "Funhouse" (The Sopranos), a 2000 episode
- Scooby's Mystery Funhouse, a 1980s Scooby-Doo television series
- TV Funhouse, a recurring skit on NBC's Saturday Night Live

== Games ==
- Fun House (board game), loosely based on the US game show
- Fun House (video game), loosely based on the US game show
- FunHouse (pinball), a 1990 pinball game
- Krusty's Fun House, a 1992 video game based on the cartoon series The Simpsons

== Music ==
=== Albums ===
- Fun House, 2013 jazz album by Benoît Delbecq and Fred Hersch
- Fun House (The Stooges album), a 1970 album by The Stooges
- Fun House (Bob & Tom album), a 1997 comedy album by The Bob and Tom Show
- Fun House, a 1998 comedy album by Dana Gould
- Here We Go: Live at the Funhouse, a 2000 album by Run-D.M.C.
- Fun House, a 2001 album by Bonepony
- Fun House (Reuben Wilson album), 2005
- Funhouse, 2008 jazz album by Gerry Mulligan
- Funhouse (Kid 'n Play album), a 1990 album by Kid 'n Play
- Funhouse (Pink album), 2008
  - Funhouse Tour, a tour by Pink in support of the album
- FunHouse (Prettifun album), 2024

=== Songs ===
- "Funhouse" (song), the fifth single from the Pink album of the same name
- "Funhouse" song by Iggy Pop from Roadkill Rising: The Bootleg Collection: 1977-2009

== Other uses ==
- The Funhouse (novel), the film's novelization by Dean Koontz
- The Funhouse (radio program), an Australian radio program on Double J

== See also ==
- Fun Home, a 2006 graphic memoir by Alison Bechdel
- Fun Home (musical), a theatrical adaptation of Bechdel's memoir
- Fun Haus, a villain resembling Jack Nimball's version of Toyman appearing in Batman: The Brave and The Bold
- Funhaus, a division of media and entertainment company Rooster Teeth
- Funhouse (Maka Akana), a Marvel Comics supervillain
