= Switch My Swag =

Song by Slayr and Prettifun

from the EP Avant Nova
- Released: July 10, 2026
- Genre: Rage; hyperpop; digicore
- Length: 2:59
- Label: Columbia
- Songwriters: Evan McDonald; Mikey J. Taylor
- Producers: Slayr; vvspipes; Nxah

"Switch My Swag" is a song by American rappers Slayr and Prettifun. It was released through Columbia Records as the second track on Slayr's EP Avant Nova on July 10, 2026. The song was produced by Slayr himself, VVSPipes, and Nxah.

== Composition and lyricism ==
"Switch My Swag" is a two-minute and 58-second song. Slayr co-wrote the song with Prettifun, VVSPipes, and Nxah, with the latter two handling the production alongside Slayr. Additionally, Slayr handled the mixing and mastering of the track. Like the rest of the tracks on the EP, "Switch My Swag" features a transition at the end that seamlessly transitions into the next track. According to Anthony Fantano, he wrote how the track breaks into a "bright, fun, synth-y, distorted trap beat."

Lyrically, the track sees the duo rap about "not switching their swag for shit."

== Reception ==
"Switch My Swag" generated positive reception from music journalists, with Zabih Safdari of laut.de calling the track a "personal highlight" of his, writing how he's longed for it and how it works perfectly and almost sees Prettifun overshadow Slayr. Fantano labeled the track as a "catchy and rough" one.
