= The Peace (song) =

- SoundCloud cover

Song by Underscores

from the album U
- Released: March 20, 2026
- Recorded: 2025
- Genre: Ballad・a capella
- Length: 2:49
- Label: Mom + Pop; Corporate Rockmusic
- Songwriter: April Harper Grey (Note: The Frost Children remix credits members Angel and Lulu Prost as songwriters.)
- Producer: Underscores

Music video
- "The Peace" on YouTube

"The Peace" is a song by the American musician Underscores. It was released as the fourth track to her third studio album, U, on March 20, 2026, through Mom + Pop and Corporate Rockmusic. Musically, it is a ballad based on vocoded harmonies and three smoke breaks that Underscores took with a crush, focusing on the ups-and-downs of their relationship and the musician's worries of being stuck yearning for them. Music critics often compared the track to the work of Imogen Heap, though Underscores named the Beatles song "Eleanor Rigby" and the Mac startup sound as direct influences.

"The Peace" received acclaim from critics, who often praised the production and emotive tone. It was later sampled by American rapper Slayr for his 2026 song "Promise". An accompanying music video for "The Peace" directed by longtime collaborator Ayodeji was released on August 12, 2026.

== Background and recording ==
Underscores wrote and recorded "The Peace" while in Chicago, New York City, Munich, on the N-71, and in mid-air, later mixing and mastering it herself. During the first of two production breakdown streams for U, she revealed that the song originally included drums, though later decided to remove them. The vocoded vocal samples originate from a recording of Underscores singing, "Mm, baby, can we talk?", which was chopped into individual vowels. The melody for the vocals were split into two MIDI sequences, being one for the chords and one for a bass voice. Underscores applied the "Hip-Hop Sub Bass" Ableton Live patch to create sub-bass frequencies, using them as if they were drum kicks.

== Composition and lyrics ==
"The Peace"
The composition of "The Peace" is based off vocoded samples of Underscores's voice that serve as the chords, which she sings on top of.

"The Peace" is a ballad that centers on Auto-Tuned and vocoded samples of Underscores's voice that define the song's chords, which music critics often compared to Imogen Heap's work, namely her 2005 single "Hide and Seek". Its production is understated and lacks any drums, but develops throughout by incorporating additional reverb and harmonies while staying focused on the vocoder refrain, eventually adding a bassline. In an interview with NME, Underscores stated that she wanted the song to "sound like the Mac startup sound was singing 'Eleanor Rigby'", additionally citing ASAP Rocky's 2013 single "Fashion Killa" as an influence while on Travis Mills's eponymous Apple Music 1 show.

Each verse of "The Peace" focuses on a different location that Underscores took a smoke break with an unnamed crush, being Brooklyn, her set at Coachella 2025, and Europe sequentially. She explores the ups-and-downs of their relationship, describing the vanilla-flavored cigarettes they shared, trying to find a "hiding spot" the two, and by the third verse, worrying if she will forever be yearning for them while "sleeping on the couch."

== Release and reception ==
"The Peace" was released as the fourth track from U on March 20, 2026, through Mom + Pop and Corporate Rockmusic. In a video with Dazed, Underscores stated that she considered leaving the song off the album, but was ultimately glad she kept it due to it becoming a fan favorite. American rapper Slayr later sampled the track in July for "Promise" from his extended play (EP) Avant Nova, which also has a crush as its main lyrical theme. Underscores provided the rapper stems from "The Peace" so he could "make [the song] to [his] full potential".

"The Peace" received acclaim from music critics upon the release of U. In his review of the song for The Fader, Tobias Hess praised Underscores's "tasteful aptitude for metaphor, seamlessly merging symbolism with clear emotional truth," calling songwriting her greatest strength. Andy Steiner of Paste similarly lauded the instrumental as "some of her most emotive, expressive production ever" and highlighted its restraint compared to Underscores's usual sound.

== Music video ==
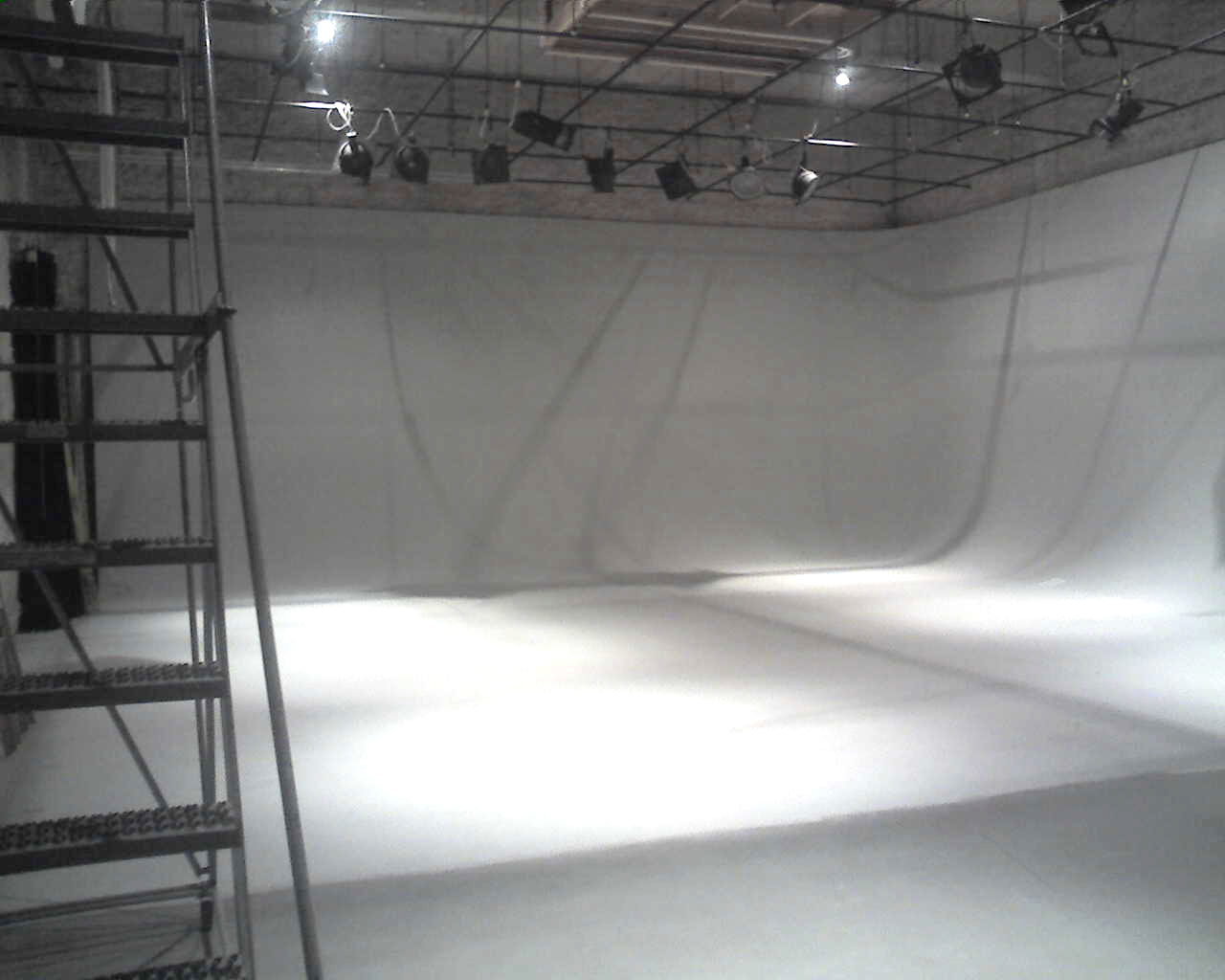
The music video for "The Peace" takes place on an empty sound stage, which is filled with smoke over time.

On August 10, Underscores announced the music video for "The Peace", which released two days later on August 12 at 12 p.m.. The video was directed by Underscores's longtime collaborator Ayodeji, who she previously worked with for videos of songs from her Fishmonger (2021) and Wallsocket (2023) albums. Underscores served as the creative director and edited the final video alongside Ayodeji. After its release, Underscores stated that she "love[d]" the video due to it being "exactly what [she] imagined [when originally] making the song".

In the music video, Underscores is swarmed by a moshing crowd while on a sound stage with dramatic lighting. The set appears almost pitch black except for the lighting, which Hess described as giving the video a "dreamy" and "liminal" quality. The crowd mirrors the house party setting of "The Peace", and smoke gradually fills the room during the video's runtime, alluding to the song's lyrics referencing vapes and cigarettes.

== Frost Children remix ==
On August 28, 2026, Underscores released a remix of "The Peace" by American pop duo Frost Children alongside the new track "Unlimited Love". The duo had previously teased the remix during a Lollapalooza afterparty show with Australian electronic music producer and DJ, Ninajirachi. After its release, Underscores publicly thanked them for remixing the song, writing on Instagram Stories that she loved it "so much".
