= Funhouse (Prettifun album) =

Studio album by Prettifun
- Released: September 29, 2024
- Genre: Rage
- Length: 43:56
- Labels: Victor Victor; Too Lost
- Producers: Ginseng; Grassarrows; Gyro; Hitec; Iankon; Jay Trench; Jdolla; Legion; Love&peace; Lucid; Lunegaze; MaxFlames; MISOGI; o0o; Outtatown; Ryanjacob; Silentheaven; Ssort

Prettifun chronology
Pretti (2024)	Funhouse (2024)	Funhouse Deluxe (2025)

Deluxe cover
- Deluxe edition cover

Funhouse (stylized as FunHouse) is the third studio album by American rapper Prettifun, released on September 29, 2024 through Victor Victor Worldwide and Too Lost. Blending elements of experimental hip-hop, rage rap, and electronic textures, Funhouse was described as an evolution of Prettifun's sound, receiving critical acclaim and expanding on the style he developed on earlier singles and EPs. Following the release, Prettifun followed through with the deluxe edition of Funhouse, which featured 15 new tracks.

== Background, composition, and release ==
Before the release of Funhouse, Prettifun had gained a following through SoundCloud uploads and underground collaborations, particularly with the production of Che's singles "Miley Cyrus" and "Pizza Time", compounded by the release of his first album, Pretti. Funhouse was first teased in September 2024 through social media posts and snippets on platforms such as TikTok and Instagram, where tracks like "Feel Like Uzi" and "Killem" were previewed.

According to Prettifun's interview with The Fader, the rapper wrote:

"It was a lot of stuff going on in my personal life. And how I made it past it was really just by perseverance," prettifun says. "I literally had to be delusional with myself, literally telling myself, 'there's a reason for all of this shit that you're going through right now."

On September 29, 2024, Prettifun released the album to all streaming platforms. Then, on August 1, 2025, Prettifun would release the deluxe for Funhouse to all streaming platforms as well.

== Critical reception ==
Professional ratings
Review scores
Source	Rating
Pitchfork	7.4/10

=== Funhouse ===
Funhouse received acclaim from critics, particularly for its maximalist production and exuberant energy. Pitchfork gave the album 7.4 out of 10, with critic Jude Noel noting that Prettifun's "maximalist songs mimic the hyperactive atmosphere of Nintendo side-scrollers," praising the artist's "baby-voiced rage-rap dense with uplifting sentiments." He commended Prettifun's growth as both vocalist and personality, pointing to the production contributions of Iankon and Ginseng as key in maintaining the album's "consistent level of mania" while allowing each track to stand as its own statement.

=== Funhouse (Deluxe) ===
Vivian Medithi of The Fader writes that Funhouse (Deluxe) captures Prettifun at his most vulnerable, emotionally drained yet still pouring his heart into his music. The album blends bright, kaleidoscopic SoundCloud-rap influences with candid reflections on depression, loss, and personal growth, drawing comparisons to Lil Uzi Vert and Pi'erre Bourne. Medithi also highlights how Prettifun harnesses self-reflection as a tool for personal strength and resilience.

=== Year-end lists ===
Year-end lists
Publication	List	Rank	Ref.
The Fader	The 50 Best Albums of 2025	5	

== Track listing ==
All tracks are written by Michael-Raymond Taylor.

Funhouse track listing
No.	Title	Producer(s)	Length
1.	"Dead First"	Ginseng; Misogi; Grassarrows	2:25
2.	"Z&S"	Ginseng; Ryanjacob	2:41
3.	"Feel Like Uzi"	MaxFlames; Ssort	2:43
4.	"Rolled1"	Ginseng; Misogi; Legion	2:48
5.	"Gaultier Bag"	Gyro	2:18
6.	"Bbyangl"	Ginseng	2:36
7.	"Killem"	Jay Trench; Ginseng; Legion	2:17
8.	"Fedswatchin"	Gyro	1:56
9.	"Move Smartr"	Ginseng; Misogi; Ryanjacob; Grassarrows	2:54
10.	"Prttigirl"	Misogi; Love&peace	2:36
11.	"Highly Favoured"	Iankon	2:17
12.	"Quarters Pennies"	Iankon	2:22
13.	"Head Strong"	Jay Trench; Ginseng; Misogi; Lunegaze	2:12
14.	"Meds"	Legion	2:18
15.	"Thank U"	Ginseng; Misogi; Legion; Love&peace	2:43
16.	"Achieve It"	Lucid	2:00
17.	"Miss U Angie"	Lucid; o0o	1:43
18.	"I Don't Sleep"	Legion	2:58
Total length:			43:56

Funhouse (Deluxe) bonus track listing
No.	Title	Producer(s)	Length
1.	"My Name"	Misogi; Outtatown	1:41
2.	"Kisses"	Jdolla	2:36
3.	"Fuck W Ya"	Ginseng; Jay Trench	2:40
4.	"Famous"	Jay Trench	2:08
5.	"Digital Love"	Iankon	2:40
6.	"Last Wish"	Iankon	1:59
7.	"Sides"	Jay Trench; Silentheaven	2:37
8.	"Heartbreaker"	Misogi; Outtatown	2:57
9.	"Unfazed"	Ginseng	2:45
10.	"Different"	Misogi; Love&peace; Jay Trench	2:28
11.	"Internet"	Ginseng; Lucid	2:35
12.	"Back"	Jay Trench	2:44
13.	"IDK WTF"	Ginseng	2:44
14.	"Infinity"	Hitec	2:48
15.	"Hi-Fi 2026"	Hitec	2:36
Total length:			37:55
