= Empty Clip =

EP by Che
- Released: June 23, 2026
- Genre: Rage
- Length: 12:26
- Label: 10K Projects
- Producers: Che; Rok; CXO

Che chronology
Para'dies (2026)	Empty Clip (2026)

Empty Clip is the fifth extended play (EP) by American rapper Che. It was self-released, originally exclusive on SoundCloud, on June 18, 2026, before being released on all streaming platforms on June 23.

== Background ==
Following the release of Fully Loaded and Para'dies, Che would perform at Lyrical Lemonade's Summer Smash on June 14, where he would preview the songs "2sday", "DMX", and "Los Santos".. Che would further tease the EP on X, stating "Let's Empty Da Clip" as a reference to the title of the EP.

After reaching a like goal set by Che on Instagram, he would release the EP exclusively on Soundcloud on June 19, 2026. Che would then release the EP on all streaming platforms on June 23.

On July 7, the EP was taken down on all streaming platforms, due to the sample for "2sday" (formerly "Tuesday") remaining uncleared. Prior to its removal, artist iLoveMakonnen, whose song was sampled in "2sday", went on TikTok Live to talk about how he was unable to clear the sample, due to his former label, OVO Sound, holding the rights to the record. Makonnen would return to TikTok Live on July 15, to confirm that the sample for "2sday" had been properly cleared, leading to the EP being brought back on streaming services on the same day.

== Track listing ==
All songs written and produced by Chase Mitchell except where listed.

Empty Clip track listing
No.	Title	Producer(s)	Length
1.	"Like Lil Mexico"		2:56
2.	"2sday"	CXO	2:48
3.	"DMX"		2:35
4.	"OG Ginobili"	Rok	1:59
5.	"Los Santos"	CXO	2:06
Total length:			12:26
