= Sayso Says =

Studio album by Che
- Released: August 30, 2024
- Recorded: 2023–2024
- Genre: Rage
- Length: 35:06
- Label: 10K Projects
- Producers: Che; CXO; Runnaberto; Saska; Ginseng; MISOGI; Jay Trench; Dreamz; J0se; Skai; Warren Hunter

Che chronology
Crueger (2023)	Sayso Says (2024)	Rest in Bass (2025)

Sayso Says is the debut studio album by American rapper Che. It was self-released on August 30, 2024. The album features a sole guest appearance from Saska.

== Background and promotion ==
Following the release of his EP Crueger, he would begin teasing Sayso Says, which is named after the EP's second track, "Sayso", with the release of singles that features collaborations with Prettifun and Sematary. Che would also tease snippets through social media, where tracks like "Pissy Coffee" and "Cut Off Your Hands" were previewed. Alongside the album's release, a music video for "I Rot, I Rot." directed by AMD of Lyrical Lemonade was released.

== Reception ==
Professional ratings
Review scores
Source	Rating
Pitchfork	7.0/10

Sayso Says received positive reviews. In a review for Pitchfork, reviewer Serge Selenou described Che's debut as a delivery of an "escapist party anthems whose dense, maximalist sound masks a slightly hollow perspective," praising the chaotic production while critiquing the album's focus. The review notes Che's use of glitchy, fast-paced textures that pull listeners into the album's racuous universe.

Independent music outlets also remarked the project's experimental sound, comparing it to electronic and hyperpop influences woven in to the modern rage rap template. Critics highlighted Che's genre-blending approach and creative use of samples, which differentiate Sayso Says within the underground rap scene.

== Track listing ==
All tracks are written by Chase Mitchell.

Sayso Says track listing
No.	Title	Producer(s)	Length
1.	"I Rot, I Rot"	Che; CXO; Runnaberto	1:59
2.	"Saska You Made It" (featuring Saska)	Che; Saska	2:37
3.	"Pretend We're Sleeping"	Che	1:52
4.	"Get Naked"	Che	1:48
5.	"Enjoy Your Life"	Ginseng; MISOGI; Jay Trench	2:00
6.	"Been There, Done That"	Che; CXO	1:42
7.	"Hex On My Chest, It's Going Down"	Che; Dreamz; Runnaberto	2:33
8.	"Pissy Coffee"	Che; Dreamz; Runnaberto	1:38
9.	"Interlude"	CXO	1:21
10.	"It's My Party and I'll Die if I Want To"	Che; J0se	2:08
11.	"Don't Tell No1"	Skai	2:01
12.	"Nunca Hacer Cocaina"	CXO	2:04
13.	"School Girl Sashimi"	Che; J0se	2:32
14.	"YDFWMNM?"	Che	1:50
15.	"Children Shouldn't Play With Dead Things"	Che	2:24
16.	"Cut Off Your Hands"	Warren Hunter	2:17
17.	"My Favorite Color Is Red"	Che; CXO	2:15
Total length:			35:06

=== Sample credits ===
- "Get Naked" contains an uncredited sample of "Meltdown", written and performed by iroha(sasaki).
- "It's My Party and I'll Die if I Want To" contains an uncredited sample of "Superheroes", written by Jay Dead and Elle Dead, performed by You Love Her.
- "My Favorite Color Is Red" contains an uncredited sample of "Untrust Us", written by Ethan Kath and Death from Above 1979, performed by Crystal Castles.

=== Notes ===
- "Saska You Made It", "Get Naked", "Enjoy Your Life", "Don't Tell No1", "Nunca Hacer Cocaina", and "Cut Off Your Hands" are stylized in all caps.
- "YDFWMNM?" is an acronym for "You Don't Fuck with Me No More"

== Charts ==
Chart performance for Sayso Says
Chart (2024)	Peak position
US Billboard Heatseekers	17
