= Power four (disambiguation) =

The Power Four are the most prominent athletic conferences in college football in the United States.

Power four or Power 4 may also refer to:

- POWER4, a microprocessor by IBM
- "Power 4", a 2025 song by Slayr from Half Blood (mixtape)
