= Hellraiser (Che and OsamaSon song) =

2025 single by Che featuring OsamaSon

Single by Che featuring OsamaSon

from the album Rest in Bass
- Released: July 15, 2025
- Genre: Rage
- Length: 3:02
- Label: 10K Projects
- Songwriters: Chase Mitchell; Amari Middleton; Nathaniel Luciano Campos
- Producer: CXO

"Hellraiser" (stylized in all caps) is a song by American rapper Che featuring fellow American rapper OsamaSon. It was released on July 15, 2025, through 10K Projects as the lead single from Che's second studio album, Rest in Bass.

"Hellraiser" is a rage track that is characterized by its hedonistic lyricism, loud distortion, and Auto-Tune-driven features. It was labeled as one of the "Best New Tracks" by Pitchfork. Upon release, a music video for the track was issued on July 15, 2025, the same day as the track's release as well as just three days before the album's release.

== Composition ==
"Hellraiser" is a three-minute and two-second-long song. Che and OsamaSon co-wrote the song with CXO, who handled the music production, mixing, and mastering for the track, while Moustafa Moustafa handled the record engineering aspect of it. According to Zachary Horvath of HotNewHipHop, he described "Hellraiser" as a mix of trap, underground rap, rage, and electronic hip-hop. The song opens with a few synthesizer lines before the bass and 808s come in. Across the track, Che and OsamaSon share the chorus, while Che handles the main lyricism, where he frequently detail his own demise". On the other hand, OsamaSon provides high-pitched ad-libs in the background. Additionally, Horvath also wrote that Che's Auto-Tuned delivery is modeled similarly as OsamaSon's.

According to Olivier Lafontant of Pitchfork, he wrote that CXO's synthesizers set the song off, and that the two rappers push their Auto-Tune to the point of breaking. Across the track, the rappers touch on their hedonistic lifestyle, which consists of things such ketamine, the brand Goyard, and silicone. Writing for The Quietus, Eden Tizard wrote that the pair "raise hell on earth" in chipmunk-like vocals that sound digitally stretched.

== Critical reception ==
Upon release, the track generated positive reviews from music journalists. According to Lafontant, "Hellraiser" was listed as one of the "Best New Tracks" upon release. While Horvath wrote that the track is a "bombastic offering" for what's to come by Che, writing that "he's here for it". According to Elaina Bernstein, she labeled "Hellraiser" as a standout track and one of the most anticipated tracks that the duo has to offer.

== Personnel ==
Credits adapted from Tidal.

- Che – vocals, engineering, songwriting
- OsamaSon – vocals, songwriting
- CXO – production, programming, mixing, mastering
- Moustafa Moustafa – engineering
