= Tiffany Day (musician) =

American singer and songwriter

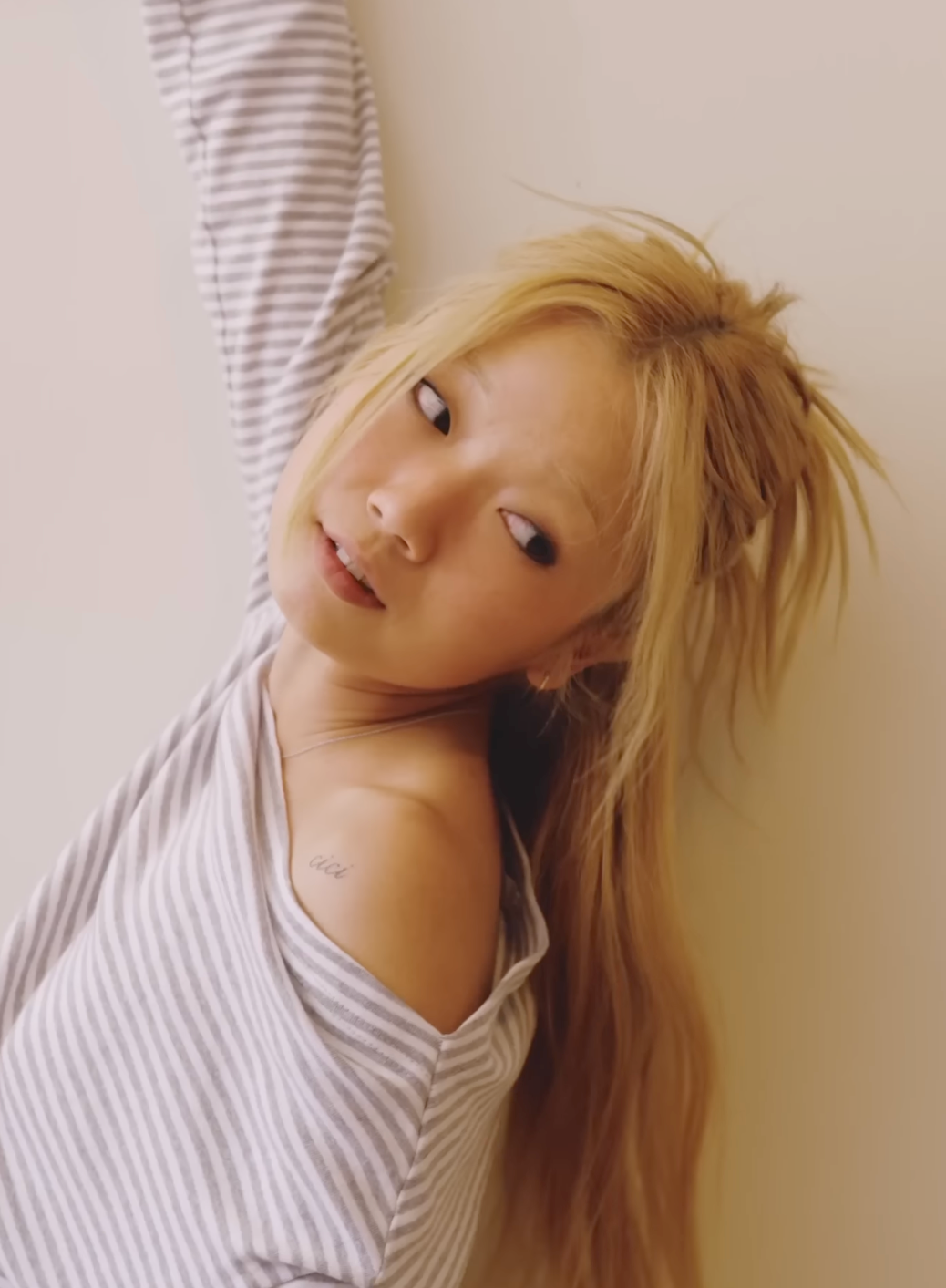
- Day in 2026

Background information
- Born: Tiffany Day Ruan; January 30, 2000 (age 26); Toronto, Ontario, Canada
- Origin: Los Angeles, California, U.S.
- Education: Loyola Marymount University
- Genres: Hyperpop; bedroom pop
- Occupations: Singer; songwriter; record producer
- Instruments: Vocals; guitar; keyboards; violin; ukulele; turntables
- Years active: 2017–present
- Label: Broke
- Website: tiffdidwhat.com

Tiffany Day Ruan (born January 30, 2000), is a Canadian-American singer, songwriter, and record producer. Raised in Wichita, Kansas, she began independently releasing music after a 2017 video of her singing into a well in Italy went viral on Twitter. She released her debut studio album, Lover Tofu Fruit, in 2024. She signed to Broke Records the following year, through which she released her second studio album, Halo, in 2026.

== Early life ==
Tiffany Day Ruan was born on January 30, 2000 in Toronto, Canada to Chinese parents and raised in Wichita, Kansas. The majority of Day's extended family still lives in China, where Day frequently visited during her childhood. As a child, her parents enrolled her in classical training for piano and violin and she also learned how to play the guitar. She created her first song in GarageBand at age 10, inspired by the Disney Channel series Hannah Montana.

Day attended Wichita Collegiate School, where she was a member of the school choir, the Madrigals. She has stated that she felt "small and quiet" and "constantly ... judged" in high school, partly due to being one of the few Asian students at the predominantly white school. Day said that comparing herself to white students affected her body image and made her ashamed of her monolid eyes and Asian features. In her senior year of high school, when K-Pop idols became popular in the United States, Day began to look up to them and appreciate her beauty as an Asian person. Day's mother encouraged her to push against the model minority stereotype which many Asian children are pressured to conform to, and pursue a career in the arts.

Day uploaded her first YouTube video, a cover of the Script's song "Breakeven", in 2015. As a YouTuber, Day taught herself to play the guitar and began posting more songs which she made in her bedroom. A video taken during a trip to Italy with her school choir, in which she sang the Leonard Cohen song "Hallelujah" into a well in Spoleto, went viral on Twitter in April 2017 and received over 312 thousand likes, with users praising her vocal abilities. The success of the video encouraged her to pursue music professionally and to upload a full-length cover of "Hallelujah" to YouTube. She was also later crowned homecoming queen. Before Day began her music career, she edited anime videos on Vine. At age 18 she enrolled at Loyola Marymount University in Los Angeles, where she studied communications and public relations, and began writing her own music.

== Career ==
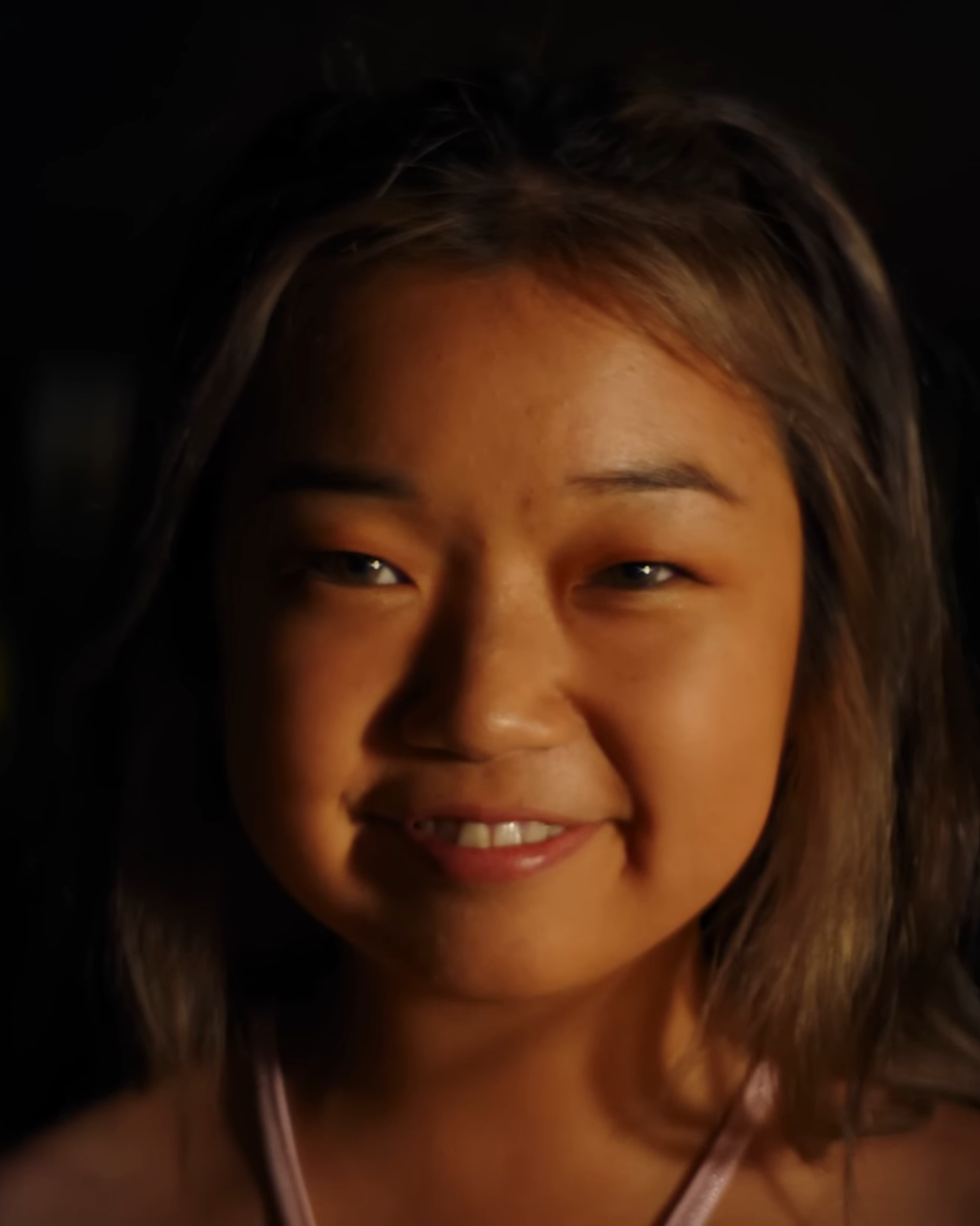
Day in 2021

While studying at Loyola Marymount, Day released several singles and extended plays (EPs), with her self-produced EP Overdramatic released in November 2020. By then, she had more than one million subscribers on YouTube. Day then released a series of four EPs—The Recovery Project, The Dependency Project (both 2021), The Renewal Project (2022) and The Gratitude Project (2023)—each based on each year of her time in college. She released the singles "Party W Out Me" and "San Francisco Sidewalk" in August 2022 and performed as an opening act for Blu DeTiger later that year.

Also that year, she embarked on The Gratitude Tour, a self-funded and headlining tour of North America. Before the Gratitude Tour, Day parted ways with her managers, leaving managerial, costuming, makeup, marketing, and light and sound programming duties to herself during the shows. Due to low ticket sales, Day was forced to cancel four shows before the tour began. This put her in credit card debt, however she later paid it back through merchandise sales on the tour.Tiffany Day – The Making of The Gratitude Tour, a documentary about the tour directed by Henry Thong, was released in 2023 and screened at several film festivals, including the Vancouver Asian Film Festival, where it won the People's Choice Award for Overall Short Film.

Day released her debut studio album, Lover Tofu Fruit, in September 2024. The album's corresponding tour began in February 2025. Day called Lover Tofu Fruit a "light" reflection of her 23-year-old self, reflection on her maturity and experiences with the death of her grandfather. Day journaled and meditated frequently while struggling with nihilist thoughts during the making of the album.

Her music found popularity on TikTok later in 2025. She performed as a supporting act for Aries on North American dates of his Glass Jaw World Tour in early 2026. Day signed with Broke Records and her second studio album and first with the label, Halo, was released on April 3, 2026. It was preceded by the singles "Pretty4U", "American Girl", "Breakup", "Tell Me What I Did", "Start Over", "Same LA", and "Everything I've Ever Wanted", which were released from 2025 to 2026.

In collaboration with slayr, Day released the single "Constantly" on June 17, 2026.

== Musical style ==
Day's music has been described as pop and EDM. Her earlier songs were bedroom pop and indie pop, with her music shifting toward a hyperpop sound starting in 2025. Tobias Hess of The Fader described her songs as "anxiety-ridden, strobe-lit pop music". She has described her lyrics as "always [based] on personal experiences". Her music has frequently been compared online to that of 2hollis, and she has expressed admiration for artist UMI's performances.

== Personal life ==
Day has trained to become a hot yoga instructor, and has been certified professionally.

Day has obsessive–compulsive disorder.

== Discography ==
Studio albums

- Lover Tofu Fruit (2024)
- Halo (2026)
