= Ezcodylee =

American rapper and singer (born 2004)

ezcodylee
- Also known as: ez; EzDaGoat
- Born: Ethan Codylee Graham; March 24, 2004 (age 22); South Los Angeles, California, U.S
- Genres: Rage; trap; digicore
- Occupations: Rapper; singer; songwriter
- Years active: 2019–present
- Website: https://ezcodylee.com/

Ethan Codylee Graham (born March 24, 2004), known professionally as ezcodylee, is an American rapper from Los Angeles, California. He first rose to popularity in 2025 with the release of his project Stunt and Die 3, a project that has been described as digicore and rage rap, backed by electric guitar riffs.

== Early life ==
Graham was born on March 24, 2004, in South Los Angeles, California. He stated how his childhood was informed by experiencing both the poorest and richest neighborhoods of Los Angeles. He was raised in a household where his family was heavily into music. Graham's mother sung and danced, his father rapped, his grandmother went to school in NorCal for music, and his uncle was a final four contestant for The Voice. Additionally, Graham stated how his neighbor, named Uncle Ben, was the uncle of Kanye West. According to Graham, he began rapping as early as 7 so that he could be "ready for Church Sunday". Graham attended middle school and high school in Hollywood.

== Career ==
Graham began making music in his early teen years. He stated that he began making music after a heartbreak, his earliest works were reminiscent to Young Thug, Lil Wayne, and Future. His earliest collaborations were with his friend Prettifun, after he introduced him and "begged" him to make music that same year. He continued to collaborate and connect with other artists, such as midwxst and Skaiwater, after discovering them through fansites and Discord. Following the start of his career, Graham released a prolific amount of music onto streaming platforms; his debut album, Untalented was released in 2019 under his previous stage name EzDaGoat, however it was lost to time. It featured artists such as 300kenn, his school friend Omar, among others. He first garnered attention in November 2020, when he had released his song 'Hello Kitty!'. In December of 2021, Graham had his first ever live performance with yvngxchris alongside others.

In November 2025, Graham was featured on Dani Kiyoki's project #LASTYEARDYING, where me made a guest appearance on the track "TATTED UP". That same month, Graham was also featured on Slayr's mixtape, Half Blood, where he made a guest appearance on the track "Wipe Yo Nose". Upon release, he began garnering attention online on social media for his performance. Graham released his eighth project, Stunt and Die 3, in February 2025. The project contained 18 tracks and had guest appearances from Remi Zerxes, ninexteen, slayr, and Prettifun. On March 24, 2025, the day of his birthday, he released the deluxe edition to Stunt and Die 3, which featured three new tracks. Writing for Pitchfork, Vivian Medithi described the project's sound as digicore and rage rap, backboned by electric guitar riffs. In December 2025, Graham opened up for Snõõper, alongside Happy Death Men.

Graham released his tenth project, STUNT 4 LIFE on his birthday, March 24, 2026. It's a 16-track project, which had a solo appearance from Happy Death Men, and the first half of the fourth installment of the Stunt and Die series. While its predecessor had some influence of punk rock, it was much more prominent in STUNT 4 LIFE. According to Graham, his goal was to be more "progressive and unorthodox" compared to his other projects. In a review by Vivian Medithi of Pitchfork, he rated the project a 7 out of 10, writing how the project sees Graham "push the synthesis of rage rap and alt rock to thunderous new extremes" while staying true to his perseverance in the face of adversity. The album's instrumentals were all live-recorded under executive production by Graham and Chris Marek. The second half of the double album will be called STUNT 4 EVER and was described by Graham as taking "more liberties" and having "more collaborations" than STUNT 4 LIFE.

On May 10, 2026, Graham made his debut at Rolling Loud 2026 in Orlando, Florida. On June 13, 2026, he made his appearance at Summer Smash 2026. Prettifun said he wanted to cry when he saw Graham perform on the Main Stage.

== Artistry and influences ==
Graham's musical style consists of digicore, rage rap, rock and punk rock. According to Graham, he cited Lil Wayne as an important early influence on his writing and music taste. It was through television, the soundtrack of shows like Kick Buttowski and Ridiculousness, that Graham first developed an interest in punk music.

== Personal life ==
At the age of six, Graham was diagnosed with dyslexia. Politically speaking, Graham is a leftist, he is a supporter of Palestine and frequently shows opposition to Israel. According to Graham, he used to face mental health issues growing up and at one point was having suicidal thoughts earlier on his life. He frequently cites his friends and family as his biggest sources of inspiration.

== Discography ==
List of albums
Title	Album details
Untalented	Released: November 1, 2019; Label: Self-released; Format: Digital download, streaming
Untalented 2	Released: January 1, 2021; Label: Self-released; Format: Digital download, streaming
Never Left Nine	Released: October 9, 2021; Label: Self-released; Format: Digital download, streaming
Stunt And Die	Released: March 24, 2022; Label: Self-released; Format: Digital download, streaming
pretty good, wbu	Released: September 9, 2022; Label: Self-released; Format: Digital download, streaming
Stunt 2 Die	Released: March 24, 2023; Label: Self-released; Format: Digital download, streaming
E A R S	Released: March 24, 2024; Label: Self-released; Format: Digital download, streaming
Stunt and Die 3	Released: February 21, 2025; Label: Self-released; Format: Digital download, streaming
Stunt and Die 3 (Deluxe Edition)	Released: March 24, 2025; Label: Self-released; Format: Digital download, streaming
STUNT 4 LIFE	Released: March 24, 2026; Label: Self-released; Format: Digital download, streaming

List of mixtapes
Title	Mixtape details
i heart ez vol 1	Released: June 16, 2023; Label: Self-released; Format: Digital download, streaming
Dedication (with prettifun)	Released: August 29, 2023; Label: Self-released; Format: Streaming
i heart ez vol 2	Released: February 1, 2024; Label: Self-released; Format: Digital download, streaming

List of extended plays
Title	Details
what a vibe	Released: April 29, 2021; Label: Self-released; Format: Streaming
#B4S4	Released: July 4, 2025; Label: Self-released; Format: Streaming
