= Halo (Tiffany Day album) =

2026 album by Tiffany Day

Studio album by Tiffany Day
- Released: April 3, 2026
- Genre: Hyperpop
- Length: 36:21
- Producer: Tiffany Day; Melvv; Niles Forester; Jack Hallenbeck; Zetra

Tiffany Day chronology
| Lover Tofu Fruit (2024) | Halo (2026) |

Singles from Halo
- 1. "Pretty4U" Released: July 18, 2025; 2. "American Girl" Released: September 13, 2025; 3. "Breakup" Released: November 14, 2025; 4. "Tell Me What I Did" Released: January 30, 2026; 5. "Start Over" Released: February 20, 2026; 6. "Same LA" Released: March 26, 2026; 7. "Everything I’ve Ever Wanted" Released: April 3, 2026; 8. "No Luck" Released: May 21, 2026

Professional ratings
Review scores
| Source | Rating |
|---|---|
| The Needle Drop | 5/10 |
| Pitchfork | 6.9/10 |

Halo (stylized in all uppercase) is the second studio album by the American singer-songwriter and record producer Tiffany Day. Described as a hyperpop record, Halo explores Day’s self doubts, personal insecurities and navigation through fame. Halo spawned eight singles: "Pretty4U", "American Girl" and "Breakup" were released in late 2025 while "Tell Me What I Did", "Start Over", and "Same LA" were released in early 2026. "Everything I’ve Ever Wanted" was released as a single concurrently with the album while “No Luck” became a single a month later.

== Background ==
After the release of her debut album Lover Tofu Fruit in 2024, Day reflected in the following year that she no longer wanted to pursue music due to her lack of fulfillment in it, deciding that her second album would be her last. However, her pivot to electronic sounds in Halo became "everything the artist always wanted her music to be."

== Critical reception ==
Pitchfork noted that this album represented Day's pivot from bedroom-pop to a more electronic sound, featuring more expansive electroclash elements. Los Angeles Times described the album as "Tricked out with the signature features of hyperpop—heavy distortion, pitch-shifted vocals, blown-out production—yet retaining the diary-driven writing style that pervades Day's discography." In a negative review, Anthony Fantano criticized Day for her quick reinvention of persona after Lover Tofu Fruit. Fantano said she "[glommed] onto one micro-pop trend after another," calling the project's Y2K and DIY aesthetics unoriginal.

== Track listing ==
Halo track listing
| No. | Title | Writer(s) | Producer(s) | Length |
|---|---|---|---|---|
| 1. | "Everything I've Ever Wanted" | Tiffany Day | Day | 2:15 |
| 2. | "DoIt4Me" | Day | Day | 3:01 |
| 3. | "Same LA" | Day; Niles Forester | Day; Melvv; Forester | 3:44 |
| 4. | "Pretty4U" | Day; Forester | Day; Forester | 2:25 |
| 5. | "Copycat" | Forester | Forester | 2:15 |
| 6. | "No Luck" | Day; Jack Hallenbeck | Day; Hallenbeck | 3:08 |
| 7. | "Breakup" | Day; Forester | Day; Forester | 2:40 |
| 8. | "Tell Me What I Did" | Day; Jeff Melvin | Day; Melvv | 2:33 |
| 9. | "Start Over" | Day; Hallenbeck | Day; Hallenbeck | 2:50 |
| 10. | "Look Up" | Day; Hallenbeck | Day; Hallenbeck | 2:17 |
| 11. | "American Girl" | Day; Forester | Day; Forester | 2:56 |
| 12. | "Farewell Toledo" | Day; Hallenbeck | Day; Hallenbeck | 2:30 |
| 13. | "It's Not Like That Anymore" | Day | Day; Melvv; Zetra | 3:47 |
| Total length: | | | | 36:21 |

== Charts ==
Chart performance for Halo
| Chart (2026) | Peak position |
|---|---|
| US Top Dance Albums (Billboard) | 25 |
