= Promise (Slayr song) =

2026 song by Slayr

Song by Slayr

from the EP Avant Nova
- Released: July 10, 2026
- Length: 2:47
- Label: Columbia
- Songwriters: Evan McDonald; Chris Marek; April Harper Grey
- Producers: Slayr; Chris Marek

Visualizer
- "Promise" on YouTube

"Promise" is the opening track from the American rapper Slayr's eighth extended play (EP), Avant Nova (2026.) The song contains elements from "The Peace" (2026), written by American musician Underscores.

Upon release, the song charted at 31 on the New Zealand Hot Singles chart, becoming his first song to chart in any country.

== Background ==
In his interview with Genius, Slayr asked Underscores for the stems of the song after he watched a breakdown video by her of her songs off her album U; after agreeing and sending the stems, Slayr stated that he had captured the "catchiest" part of the track, looped it, and added drums to it, to which he called it the "Underscores original, with a Slayr twist."

== Composition and lyrics ==
"Promise" is a two-minute-and-47-second song. Slayr co-wrote the song with Chris Marek, who helped co-produce it. Slayr handled the track's engineering, mixing, and mastering. The song contains elements from "The Peace" (2026), written by American musician Underscores. Like his previous tracks throughout his discography, "Promise" also features a music transition at the end of the track which seamlessly transitions into the next track.

Lyrically, the track focuses on Slayr reflecting on the butterflies that come with having a crush. In the first verse, he directly shouts out Underscores by her alias April and thanks her for clearing the sample, rapping that the two "should do some more" songs together.

== Reception ==
"Promise" received positive responses from music critics. Anthony Fantano of The Needle Drop described it as a "banger" and praised how it built on "The Peace", calling it his favorite track from the EP. The track was also featured on Underscores' The Fader mix live for her cover party.

== Charts ==
Chart performance
Chart (2026)	Peak position
New Zealand Hot Singles (RMNZ)	31
