= Bonepony =

American rock band

- Origin: Baltimore, Maryland, U.S.
- Genres: Rock; country; bluegrass; rockabilly
- Years active: 1989–present
- Labels: Capitol Records; Super Duper Recordings
- Members: Scott Johnson; Nicolas "Nick" Nguyen; Kenny Wright
- Past members: See: former band members
- Website: bonepony.com

Bonepony is an American rock band based in Nashville formed in 1989 by Scott Johnson and Bryan Ward, along with original members Conrad St. Clair and Scott Beyer. They have released four studio albums and mix rock music with country, bluegrass, and rockabilly. The band has been noted for its members' mastery of many different stringed and percussion instruments, which they often trade among each other during live performances.

== History ==
After the first year of touring the club circuit as far west as Texas, original drummer Scott Beyer was let go and replaced by Eric X in early 1991. In the summer of 1991, Johnson, Ward, and St. Clair, on bass began working with Greg Kane at MCA Music in Nashville and collaborating with staff songwriters. Johnson and Ward moved to Nashville that fall and although St. Clair was in Nashville constantly, he still lived near Washington, D.C. Eric X was not involved in the Nashville writing sessions however he performed with the band.

For the remainder of 1991 and early 1992, they went on short tours throughout the east coast and the Midwest. The writing sessions in Nashville continued and at a certain point, Johnson and Ward started working on the side with a producer Kenny Mims, unbeknownst to St. Clair or the group's manager at the time, Tabby Crabb. Eric X and Conrad St. Clair, the original bass player, left the project in early 1992, at which point Johnson and Ward split from MCA and manager Tabby Crabb to work with Kenny Mims, who became a full-time member. Since then the band usually the band has not had a full-time drummer or bassist, and the members often maintain rhythm by stomping via specially-equipped shoes or wooden boards.

Bonepony signed with Capitol Records in 1994 and released the album Stomp Revival in 1995. During that time the band opened for Bob Seger and Santana. Mims then left the band and was replaced by Tramp (Mike Lawing), a multi-instrumentalist. Sales were very disappointing and Capitol dropped the band. Johnson said the band supposedly had a deal with Capitol to make two albums. "A lot of changes were going on in the music business then, you know, Dave Matthews (was not popular) yet, Blues Traveler, they were on their fourth record which hadn’t really quite hit yet either... it was a real backlash of all the Seattle music that was going on, a lot of guessing as to what was going to be the next hot thing." They released their second album, Traveler's Companion, in 1999 via their own label Super Duper Recordings. Founding member Bryan Ward left the band in 1999 and was replaced by another multi-instrumentalist, Nicolas "Nick" Nguyen. The band toured the U.S. extensively during that period. The live album Fun House was released in 2001. Bonepony received additional attention in 2002 when their song "Mountainside" was used in a regional advertising campaign for Dodge trucks.

The album Jubilee, featuring several guest musicians, was released in 2003. Tramp retired from the band in 2004 and was replaced by Kenny Wright. Their final album Feeling It was released in 2006. The band continues to tour extensively usually playing about 200 shows per year.

== Band members ==
Current

- Scott Johnson - vocals, guitar, harmonica, percussion, bass pedals, drums
- Nicolas "Nick" Nguyen - guitar, banjo, mandolin, Dobro, violin, viola, bass pedals, keyboards, vocals
- Kenny Wright - drums and percussion, guitar, mandolin, mandola, dulcimer, stomp board, vocals

Former

- Bryan Ward - acoustic guitar
- Kenny Mims - Dobro, dulcimer, mandolin, mandola
- Jason Dunaway - bass guitar
- Mickey Grimm - drums, percussion
- Mike "Tramp" Lawing - fiddle, banjo, mandolin
- Scott Beyer - drums
- Conrad St. Clair - bass guitar, vocals
- Eric X - drums

== Discography ==
- Stomp Revival (1995)
- Traveler's Companion (1999)
- Fun House (live, 2001)
- Rare Cuts: Volume 1 (compilation, 2002)
- Jubilee (2003)
- Feeling It (2006)
- Celebration Highway (live, 2007)
- Stomp Box (compilation, 2009)
