= Fully Loaded (Che EP) =

EP by Che
- Released: March 27, 2026
- Genre: Rage
- Length: 11:46
- Label: 10K Projects
- Producer: Che; Rok

Che chronology
Rest in Bass: Encore (2025)	Fully Loaded (2026)	Para'dies (2026)

Alternative cover
- Cover used for streaming services

Singles from Fully Loaded
- 1. "Million Dollar Mansion / Promoting Violence" Released: March 27, 2026

Fully Loaded is the third extended play (EP) by American rapper Che. It was self-released, originally exclusive on SoundCloud, on March 27, 2026. While the singles, "Million Dollar Mansion" and "Promoting Violence", were released on streaming services. The EP would later be released on streaming services on April 1, 2026.

The EP is the first example of Che using a deepened vocal tone. Its cover artwork is a painting by Trevor Brown of Madonna with a black eye, which was previously used on Crystal Castles' Alice Practice EP. On May 28, Che mysteriously updated the cover to the EP.

== Background and promotion ==
With the release of Rest in Bass and its deluxe, Che announced that he will be headlining for the Monster Energy Outbreak Tour, which would start on March 31, 2026.

To promote the upcoming tour, Che would tease a snippet previewing both of the singles, "Million Dollar Mansion" and "Promoting Violence" on social media.

== Track listing ==
Credits for "Million Dollar Mansion" and "Promoting Violence" adapted from Tidal. All songs written by Chase Mitchell except where listed.

Fully Loaded track listing
No.	Title	Producer(s)	Length
1.	"Million Dollar Mansion"		2:13
2.	"Promoting Violence"	Rok	2:00
3.	"White Folk"		2:52
4.	"Tattoos"	Rok	2:23
5.	"Kittens"	Rok	2:16
Total length:			11:46
