= You Love Her =

English electronic music project

- Origin: Bath, United Kingdom
- Years active: 2007–present
- Labels: Kitsuné, Glasstone Records
- Members: Jay "Rocky" Dead / Elle Dead (2007-2012)
- Website: Bandcamp; Myspace; Myspace for their remixes

You Love Her (formerly known as You Love Her Coz She's Dead and stylized as YOU LOVE HER) is an English electronic music project formed in Bath in 2007.

== History ==
The project signed to French record label Kitsuné as a duo in 2008. Their debut single, "Wizards", appeared on the label's Gildas & Masaya – Paris compilation in May 2008. "Superheroes" was included on Kitsuné Maison Compilation 6 in October 2008. Their first EP, Inner City Angst, was released in November 2008.

You Love Her Coz She's Dead appeared, performing the single "Superheroes", on the third series of British teen drama series Skins in "JJ", during a drug-fueled fight scene in a nightclub. The artist then known as Sucker Twin joined with YLHCSD in 2008 as an alumni collaborating regularly and touring with them. She joined officially in 2009 but left the same year. By 2012, Elle had left the duo, and new singer Guilia joined up. That year Sucker Twin (solo artist and producer Bella Panic) re-joined. They no longer collaborate according to social media.

The band's self-titled debut album was released in August 2011 on independent label, Glasstone Records, with two singles from the album released prior to the studio compilation.

In April 2012, the band released a statement through Facebook that Elle had left the duo. Jay has been collaborating with Mia Mort since June 2014.

In 2021, Jay announced that he would be working on new material for the project. The single "Culture Test" was released on 18 August 2021.

The group's name was changed to You Love Her on 24 May 2022.

== Awards and nominations ==
They won the award for Best Electronica Act at the 2008 Indy Awards.

== Discography ==
=== Albums ===
- You Love Her Coz She's Dead (2011)
- New Superheroes & Demos (2015)

=== EPs ===
- Inner City Angst (2008)
- Crystal Deth (2015)

=== Singles ===
- "Superheroes" (2008)
- "Dead End" (2008)
- "Me Versus You" (2009)
- "Young Tender Hearts Beat Fast" (2009)
- "Paraffin" (2010)
- "Sunday Best" (2010)
- "Mud" feat Sucker Twin (2011)
- "Be Brave" (2013)
- "Let Me Break" (2014)
- "Concrete Kiss" (2014)
- "I Miss You" (2015)
- "Never Grow Old" feat Sucker Twin (2015)
- "Ice" feat Sucker Twin (2015)
- "Break Down" (2016)
- "Culture Test" (2021)
- "Be Brave" (2021)
- "Salute" (2022)

=== Compilations ===
Album or Compilation	Release date	Song
Gildas & Masaya - Paris	May 6, 2008	"Wizards"
Kitsuné Maison Compilation 6	October 27, 2008	"Superheroes"
