= Pizza Time =

2024 single by Che

Single by Che
- Released: May 29, 2024
- Recorded: 2024
- Genre: Rage; trap
- Length: 1:59
- Label: 10K Projects
- Songwriter: Chase Shaun Mitchell
- Producer: Prettifun

Che singles chronology
"Miley Cyrus" (2024)	"Pizza Time" (2024)	"666" (2024)

Music video
- "Pizza Time" on YouTube

"Pizza Time" is a single by American rapper Che, released on May 29, 2024, with an accompanying music video. It was written by Che and produced by Prettifun. It is one of Che's most popular and acclaimed songs, and has been recognized as a landmark song in the 2020s rage music scene.

== Critical reception ==
John Norris of V Magazine described "Pizza Time" and "Miley Cyrus" as "freewheeling" and "packed with fuck-it-why-not drops and non-sequiturs", while describing its music video as "trippy". Vivian Medithi of The Fader wrote, "On last year's "Miley Cyrus" and "Pizza Time", blackhole 808s produced by Prettifun slingshot Che's delirious AutoTune flow to stellar new heights.

Pitchfork ranked the song at number 70 on their list of the 100 Best Songs of 2024 list. The publication described it as "wilder and weirder" than anything from his 2024 mixtape Sayso Says, writing, "[Che's] cursive voice sounds almost made to slink and bunny-hop across Prettifun's psychotic slot machine of a beat." They described it as a "level-up" for Che, elevating him to "one of the most electric stylists in the underground".

== Personnel ==
- Che – lead vocals, songwriting
- Prettifun – songwriting, production
- CXO – mixing, mastering
- DJ Smokey – additional vocals
- WhiteCollarWill – creative director
- NoahSoCold – creative director
- PoppyGavin – creative director
