= Prettifun =

American rapper (born 2005)

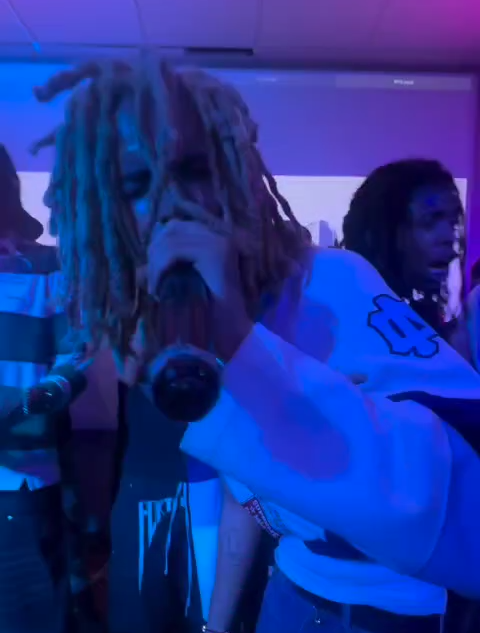
- Prettifun at the 2025 InThaFest festival

Background information
- Also known as: Mr. TenFigs; Mikey Taylor; mikey
- Born: Michael-Raymond Javier Taylor; August 1, 2005 (age 21); Charlotte, North Carolina, U.S.
- Genres: Rage; pluggnB; hyperpop
- Occupations: Rapper; singer; record producer; songwriter
- Years active: 2021–present
- Label: Victor Victor

Michael-Raymond Javier "Mikey" Taylor (born August 1, 2005), professionally known as Prettifun, is an American rapper, singer, record producer and songwriter. Starting his career in 2021, he first gained attention in 2024 after producing Che's singles "Miley Cyrus" and "Pizza Time" before gaining his own following from his albums Pretti and Funhouse.

== Early life ==
Michael-Raymond Javier Taylor was born on August 1, 2005 and raised in Charlotte, North Carolina. Taylor first grew up in lower middle class in Charlotte, North Carolina. Throughout middle school and high school, Taylor participated in theater. He attended the Northwest School of the Arts for theater, but later dropped out to graduate from a different high school.

== Career ==
=== 2020–2021: Beginnings ===
Taylor began making beats at the age of 13, first using drum pads, then incorporating DAWs into his production. Prettifun began rapping during the COVID-19 pandemic at the urging of his friend, ezcodylee, with whom he created his earliest works. Around this time, he connected with members of the now-defunct online collective 4ersona, whose roster included skaiwater, Rich Amiri, and Che, with whom he would later frequently collaborate.

=== 2024–2025: Rise to fame and major releases ===
While working part-time jobs in Charlotte, he released his first album, Hi-Fi, in 2023. In 2024, Taylor had a breakthrough hit with his production on Che's singles "Miley Cyrus" and "Pizza Time." His own projects, including Pretti and Funhouse, further established him as both a rapper and producer. In 2025, he released his deluxe album, Funhouse Deluxe. On June 20, 2025, Taylor made his debut at the 2025 Summer Smash festival.

=== 2026–present: Collaborations & Pretti Loves U 2 ===
On March 6, 2026, Taylor made a guest appearance on Slayr's BloodLuxe, where he helped produce the track "Racks". On May 9, 2026, Taylor made his debut at the 2026 Rolling Loud in Orlando, Florida. On June 13, 2026, Taylor performed at Summer Smash 2026. On July 10, 2026, Taylor was featured on Slayr's EP, Avant Nova. Shortly after, on July 14, 2026, it was announced that Taylor would be one of the planned opening acts for Ken Carson's Xperimenting Tour (along with DJ Moon and Xaviersobased), comprising fourteen United States concerts from August 26, 2026, to September 23, 2026. On August 21, 2026, Taylor released his album, Pretti Loves U 2.

== Musical style ==
Taylor's music combines rage rap, hyperpop, and melodic trap, marked by bright synths, distorted 808s, and a maximalist “wall of sound” often compared to video game atmospheres. Influenced by Pierre Bourne but shaped by his time in the online collective 4ersona, he pairs euphoric, chiptune-inspired production with a baby-voiced delivery similar to Lil Uzi Vert or Playboi Carti in songs such as "Pissy Pamper." His music is often described as optimistic, cute, and positive. Taylor himself has characterized "fun" in his work as more broadly about creativity and engagement rather than always upbeat themes.

== Discography ==
=== Studio albums ===
Title	Album details
Hi-Fi	Released: December 20, 2023; Label: Self-released; Format: Digital download, streaming
Pretti	Released: August 1, 2024; Label: Self-released; Format: Digital download, streaming
Funhouse	Released: September 29, 2024; Label: Self-released; Format: Digital download, streaming
Pretti Loves U 2	Released: August 21, 2026; Label: Victor Victor; Format: Digital download, streaming

=== Extended plays ===
Title	Album details
most wonderful time of year	Released: January 25, 2023; Label: Self-released; Format: Digital download, streaming
Mr.TenFigs	Released: August 21, 2023; Label: Self-released; Format: Digital download, streaming
Hi-Fi 0.5	Released: September 15, 2023; Label: Self-released; Format: Digital download, streaming

=== Singles ===
Title	Year	Album
"dream"	2022	Non-album singles
"kelp"	2022	Non-album singles
"evisu"	2022	Non-album singles
"Jackie Chan"	2023	Hi-Fi
"ate"	2023	Non-album singles
"Savior"	2024	Non-album singles
"Ice Cream"	2024	Pretti
"idk wtf"	2025	FunHouse Deluxe
"Famous"	2025	FunHouse Deluxe
"Unfazed"	2025	FunHouse Deluxe
"Digital Love"	2025	FunHouse Deluxe
"YCDL"	2025	Non-album singles
"Workout"	2025	Non-album singles
"Moon and the Stars"	2026	Pretti Loves U 2
"Nobody"	2026	Pretti Loves U 2
"Scene"	2026	Pretti Loves U 2
