= Rest in Bass =

2025 studio album by Che

Studio album by Che
- Released: July 18, 2025
- Recorded: 2024–2025
- Genre: Rage
- Length: 48:24
- Label: 10K Projects
- Producers: Azure; CXO; Ginseng; Gyro; Warren Hunter; Legion; Love&Peace; Lucid; Repglick; Rok; Skai

Che chronology
Sayso Says (2024)	Rest in Bass (2025)	Rest in Bass: Encore (2025)

Alternative cover
- Original Spotify cover

Singles from Rest in Bass
- 1. "Hellraiser" Released: July 15, 2025

Rest in Bass is the second studio album by American rapper Che, released on July 18, 2025, through 10K Projects. The album is a successor to his 2024 debut project Sayso Says and features a darker, grimmer musical aesthetic with heavy emphasis on distorted basslines and industrial synths. The album is hosted by DJ Rennessy and features guest appearances from OsamaSon, Xaviersobased, and Chuckyy.

On December 25, 2025, Che released a deluxe edition of the album titled Rest in Bass: Encore, consisting of 14 additional tracks and another guest appearance from OsamaSon.

== Background ==
Following the success of his 2024 debut Sayso Says, Che announced the title of the album on February 7, 2025. Following the announcement, Che then began teasing Rest in Bass in early 2025 through snippets on SoundCloud and social media. On July 15, 2025, he released the lead single "Hellraiser" featuring OsamaSon with an accompanying music video and announced the release date of the project.

== Release, promotion, and marketing ==
Leading up to the release, Che teased various songs including "KISS" with CXO, "Pose for the Pic", "Love (MKB)", and "Green Day". A surprise pop-up listening event in New York City—sponsored by Ksubi—was shut down by authorities before it could begin, adding to the underground buzz around the album. Che also sent an iPod containing the album to streamer 42CEO days before its release.

The album also gained traction through platforms like TikTok and SoundCloud, where early leaks and fan speculation generated anticipation. A teaser reel uploaded in February 2025 hinted at the distorted sonic direction and several collaborations.

Che described the album as "Punk, raw, and bass".

== Critical reception ==
Professional ratings
Review scores
Source	Rating
laut.de	4/5 stars
The Needle Drop	7/10
Pitchfork	8.3/10

Rest in Bass received critical acclaim, with praise for high-energy production, fuzzy sound, and innovative use of mixtape structure. Critics praised the album for its dedication to the lo-fi, rage-fueled sound and criticized its lack of emotional depth. Pitchfork compared the album to Playboi Carti's 2020 album Whole Lotta Red. It was placed on their list of "The 32 Best Albums of 2025", stating, "With the critical attention-to-detail and electronic impulses of the best of digicore, Che impossibly finds a new angle into rage rap by making Whole Lotta Red for nerds."

Pitchfork gave the album a 8.3 out of 10 and rated it as Best New Music. Reviewer Rae-Aila Crumble described how Che "pushes his voice to extremes," and called the album "the platonic ideal of rage rap." She complimented production on the album for chaotic layering of redlined 808s, digital grittiness, and punk textures, and cited tracks such as "Doe Deer," "Dior Leopard," and "Mannequin" as highlights. Crumble further pointed out the dichotomy between Che's tough delivery and softer lyrics, particularly in the instance of "Dior Leopard," where Che reflects on drug use and dysfunctional family ties. The review ended by deeming Rest in Bass "purveys raw catharsis with both restraint and anarchy," as one of the most powerful underground releases of 2025.

The Needle Drop's Anthony Fantano awarded the album a light 7, saying it was "one of the most fully realized rage projects in recent memory." He referenced the frantic energy and blown-out sound design of the album as he praised Xaviersobased and Chuckyy's features for introducing contrast and energy. Fantano criticized the album for repetition in texture and disjointed sequencing, but also praised Che for possessing "rockstar-level energy" and experimenting within a very oversaturated subgenre of trap music.

Bryson Paul of HotNewHipHop described the album as "Che's most audacious work yet." Elaina Bernstein of Hypebeast called the album the "epitome of rage-rap in the post-SoundCloud era."

The Fader's Vivian Medithi described Rest in Bass as an album which pulls influence from "rainbow-y EDM and nightcore vocaloid". He also described the album as a darker and sharper departure from Che's previous works, noting "sawtooth synths grating against open hi-hats and hollowed-out 808s, degraded samples mired beneath sludgy basslines and plodding drums." Medithi also noted how Che often raps about death in his music, but RIB sees him go "full kamikaze". During The Fader's weekly music roundup, Rest in Bass was a described as a standout album, and was listed as one of the top five new albums that music listeners need to listen to.

Eden Tizard of The Quietus wrote how Rest in Bass "is a dizzying rush of overstimulated beats and frazzled synths". He also wrote how the young rapper follows in the footsteps of "ATLien Playboi Carti in a chase for ever-escalating levels of extremity. He's a self professed rockstar, and a live wire hedonist." Additionally, for the music of the month, Tizard has Rest in Bass as one of the albums of July.

Additionally, Pitchfork ranked "Rest In Bass" at number 39 on their Top 50 Best Albums of 2025. Complex ranked the album at number 29 on its equivalent list.

=== Song reception ===
According to Olivier Lafontant of Pitchfork, he claims that "Hellraiser" is a freakishly bubbly song, featuring staticky deliriums, scratchy chirrups, and elastic synths from CXO. Lafontant also claims how the song sees the duo "test their breaking points as if to see whose Auto-Tune plugins would crash first". Lafontant also humorously wrote how "Hellraiser" is "what happens when you give molly and FL to some kids raised on WLR leaks and Cartoon Network". Due to the track's individual success, it was nominated as one of the best new rap tracks by Pitchfork.

The Quietus' finest, Eden Tizard wrote how "Slam Punk" sees Che give an appropriate shoutout to rapper and pioneer, Lil B, as well as Future, who is "the Atlanta elder statesman of psychedelic autotune", according to Tizard, lines from the track such as "I just fucked this bitch in some Gucci flip flops," is a "claim hard to take at face value when uttered from what appears to be the zig-zagging electric gremlin from Gremlins 2: A New Batch". Tizard also wrote how the track is filled with impish compulsion, and heavy-hitting ad-libs, which Tizard compared to as a game of ping-pong. Lastly, Tizard wrote how the line is a "far cry from Future's lean hiccup come synthetic sob – in that context the Gucci line sounded less like a brag and more like a brief moment of intoxicated clarity, perhaps a heart on sleeve confession."

=== Year-end lists ===
Publication	Accolade	Rank	Ref.
Complex	The 50 Best Albums of 2025	23	
HotNewHipHop	The 40 Best Rap Albums of 2025	8	
Paste	The 25 best rap albums of 2025	15	
Pitchfork	The 50 Best Albums of 2025	39	
Pitchfork	The 32 Best Rap Albums of 2025	25	
Rolling Stone	The 25 Best Hip-Hop Albums of 2025	9	
The Quietus	Albums of the Year 2025	63	
Stereogum	The 50 Best Albums Of 2025	41	

== Tour ==
Along with the album's release, Che also announced that the album would have its own designated tour, which began on September 3 in Houston, Texas and ended on October 2, at Che's hometown, Atlanta, Georgia. In addition to US dates, there were two dates in Canada (Toronto and Montreal).

According to Che in his interview with The Fader, he talked about how he wants the energy to be like at his tour:

"I want the crowd to feel like they're at a ritual and they're just here to praise me [...] It's like a savior of music thing," he said. "I want people to hear my music and feel safe, like there's no struggles at all, nothing to worry about at all in the world."

Che 2025 Tour Dates
Date	City	Venue
September 3, 2025	Houston, TX	House of Blues Bronze Peacock
September 4, 2025	Dallas, TX	House of Blues Dallas (Cambridge Room)
September 7, 2025	Phoenix, AZ	Crescent Ballroom
September 9, 2025	Los Angeles, CA	El Rey Theatre
September 12, 2025	Portland, OR	Star Theater
September 14, 2025	Seattle, WA	Neumos
September 17, 2025	Denver, CO	Cervantes' Other Side
September 19, 2025	Chicago, IL	The Vic Theater
September 21, 2025	Toronto, ON	The Opera House
September 22, 2025	Montreal, QC	Théâtre Fairmount
September 23, 2025	Brooklyn, NY	Warsaw Concerts
September 26, 2025	Boston, MA	Paradise Rock Club (Music Hall)
September 27, 2025	Philadelphia, PA	Theatre of Living Arts
September 28, 2025	Washington, D.C.	Union Stage
October 1, 2025	Charlotte, NC	The Fillmore Charlotte (The Underground)
October 2, 2025	Atlanta, GA	Center Stage

Che is set to go back on the road to promote the Encore edition of the album. The new leg will begin on March 31 in Santa Ana, California and will end in San Antonio, Texas on May 14.

Che 2026 Tour Dates
Date	City	Venue
March 31, 2026	Santa Ana, CA	The Observatory
April 1, 2026	San Diego, CA	House of Blues (San Diego)
April 20, 2026	Cleveland, OH	House of Blues (Cleveland)
April 25, 2026	New Haven, CT	Toad's Place
April 28, 2026	Boston, MA	Big Night Live
April 29, 2026	Huntington, NY	The Paramount
April 30, 2026	Montclair, NJ	The Wellmont Theater
May 2, 2026	Allentown, PA	Archer Music Hall
May 3, 2026	Baltimore, MD	Nevermore Hall
May 6, 2026	Raleigh, NC	The Ritz
May 8, 2026	Nashville, TN	Mainstage At Cannery Hall
May 9, 2026	Atlanta, GA	Tabernacle
May 10, 2026	Orlando, FL	Rolling Loud 2026
May 13, 2026	Austin, TX	Emo's
May 14, 2026	San Antonio, TX	Paper Tiger

Che is set to bring a tour to Europe titled Che: Lost in Europe to promote Rest in Bass and the Encore edition of the album. The tour will begin on July 1 in Paris, France and will end in Frauenfeld, Switzerland as part of Openair Frauenfeld on July 10.

Che 2026 Europe Tour Dates
Date	City	Venue
July 1, 2026	Paris, France	Le Trabendo
July 3, 2026	Gräfenhainichen, Germany	Splash! (festival)
July 5, 2026	Amsterdam, Netherlands	Melkweg
July 7, 2026	Manchester, United Kingdom	New Century Hall
July 8, 2026	London, United Kingdom	Electric Brixton
July 10, 2026	Frauenfeld, Switzerland	Openair Frauenfeld

== Track listing ==
All tracks are written by Chase Mitchell. "Hellraiser" written with Amari Middleton, "Mannequin" written with Xavier Lopez, "Never Too Young to Die" written with Charles Davis.

Rest in Bass track listing
No.	Title	Producer(s)	Length
1.	"Slam Punk"	Rok	1:42
2.	"Rolling Stone"	Azure	2:33
3.	"On Fleek"	CXO	1:53
4.	"Lip Filler"	Rok	2:02
5.	"Hood Famous"	Rok	3:26
6.	"BossUpppp"	Rok; Gyro; Azure	2:56
7.	"Marceline"	Rok	2:00
8.	"Die Young"	Gyro	2:08
9.	"Hellraiser" (with OsamaSon)	CXO	3:02
10.	"Dior Leopard"	Azure	4:29
11.	"Mannequin" (with Xaviersobased)	CXO	2:03
12.	"Black Swan"	CXO; Skai; Legion	4:17
13.	"MDMA"	Warren Hunter	2:42
14.	"Never Too Young to Die" (with Chuckyy)	Repglick; Lucid	3:15
15.	"Eardrummer"	Ginseng; Legion; Love&Peace	3:18
16.	"Doe Deer"	Rok; CXO	1:54
17.	"Stagedivin"	Azure	2:04
18.	"Bass"	CXO	2:33
Total length:			48:24

=== Sample credits ===
- "Bass" contains an uncredited sample of "Lemon Glow", written by Alex Scally and Victoria Legrand, and performed by Beach House.

=== Notes ===
- All tracks are stylized in all caps.
- "Bass" is stylized as "BA$$".

== Personnel ==
Credits adapted from Tidal.

- Che – vocals, engineering
- CXO – mixing, mastering (all tracks); programming (tracks 3, 9, 12, 16, 18)
- Rok – programming (1, 4–7, 16)
- Azure – programming (2, 6, 10, 17)
- Gyro – programming (6, 8)
- OsamaSon – vocals (9)
- Moustafa Moustafa – engineering (9)
- Xaviersobased – vocals, engineering (11)
- Legion – programming (12, 15)
- Skai – programming (12)
- Warren Hunter – programming (13)
- David Meiners – engineering (14)
- Lucid – programming (14)
- Repglick – programming (14)
- Chuckyy – vocals (14)
- Ginseng – programming (15)
- Love&Peace – programming (15)

== Rest in Bass: Encore ==
Rest in Bass: Encore

Studio album (reissue) by Che
- Released: December 25, 2025
- Genre: Rage
- Length: 1:23:02
- Label: 10K Projects
- Producers: Che; CXO; Gyro; Legion; Rok; Azure; Warren Hunter

Rest in Bass: Encore (stylized in all caps) is a reissue studio album by American rapper Che. It was released on December 25, 2025, through 10K Projects. The album was released as the deluxe edition to his second studio album Rest in Bass. The album features an additional feature from American rapper OsamaSon.

=== Background ===
Before the deluxe edition's release, Che would take to his Instagram page to announce its release, stating that it would be released on Christmas Day, with the caption of his post being: "FUCKIT IM STEALIN XMAS."

=== Composition ===
On the song "Make Out with My Choppa", Alexander Cole of HotNewHipHop wrote how the beat production for the track is the most outlandish piece of work that someone will hear, citing how it aligns with the underground rap philosophy, by making "everything as loud and as glitched out as humanly possible."

=== Track listing ===
All tracks are written by Chase Mitchell. "Whippin" written with Amari Middleton.

Rest in Bass: Encore disc two track listing
No.	Title	Producer(s)	Length
1.	"King of Rock"	CXO	2:01
2.	"Make Out with My Choppa"	Che	2:00
3.	"Holy Moly"	Gyro; Legion; Rok	2:00
4.	"Die Hard"	Legion	4:35
5.	"Cutthroat"	Gyro	1:55
6.	"Monster"	Che	3:53
7.	"Dirty Sprite"	Che; CXO	3:43
8.	"Serve Da Bass"	Gyro; Rok	1:51
9.	"Riri"	Gyro	1:45
10.	"Whippin" (with OsamaSon)	Gyro	1:56
11.	"What's Love"	Azure	2:11
12.	"Freak Neek"	Azure	2:12
13.	"UAV"	Warren Hunter; CXO	2:16
14.	"I'm Sorry"	Gyro; Rok	2:09
Total length:			1:23:02

=== Notes ===
- All tracks are stylized in all caps.
- "Serve da Bass" is stylized as "SERVE DA BA$$".
- "What's Love" and "I'm Sorry" are stylized without their apostrophes.

== Personnel ==
Credits adapted from Tidal.

- Che – vocals, engineering; programming (tracks 2, 6-7)
- CXO – mixing, mastering (all tracks), programming (tracks 1, 7, 13)
- Rok – programming (3, 8, 14)
- Azure – programming (11-12)
- Gyro – programming (3, 5, 8-10, 14)
- OsamaSon – vocals (10)
- Moustafa Moustafa – engineering (10)
- Legion – programming (3-4)
- Warren Hunter – programming (13)

== Release history ==
Release dates and formats for Rest in Bass
Region	Date	Label(s)	Format(s)	Edition	Ref.
Various	July 18, 2025	10K Projects	Digital download; streaming	Standard	
Various	December 25, 2025	10K Projects	Digital download; streaming	Deluxe	
Various	August 22, 2025	10K Projects	Vinyl	Standard	
Various	December 25, 2025	10K Projects	CD	Deluxe	
Various	December 25, 2025	10K Projects	2LP	Deluxe	
