= Half Blood (mixtape) =

2025 mixtape by Slayr

Mixtape by Slayr
- Released: November 5, 2025
- Genres: Trap; rage; digicore
- Length: 30:53
- Label: Columbia (Note: Half Blood was originally self-released by Slayr before being reissued by Columbia Records in January 2026, alongside BloodLuxe that March following his signing to the label, although streaming platforms attribute the phonographic copyright solely to Slayr.)
- Producers: 808toofly; Bbysizzun; Break64bit; Casketz; Doxxmade; Jackwya; Dani Kiyoko; Chris Marek; Slayr; Waera

Slayr chronology
HeavenTunes (2025)	Half Blood (2025)	Luxe 0.1 (2025)

Singles from Half Blood
- 1. "Set in Stone" Released: August 22, 2025; 2. "Power 4" Released: April 29, 2026 (Note: "Power 4" was removed from the streaming re-release of Half Blood due to sample clearance and was later re-released as a standalone single.)

BloodLuxe cover

Half Blood is the seventh mixtape by the American rapper Slayr. It was self-released on November 5, 2025. Initially planned as an extended play, the project expanded into a full-length mixtape during development. The mixtape blends elements of trap, rage, digicore, and electronic music while drawing influence from video game soundtracks and internet-based music scenes. The mixtape features production from several producers, including Slayr himself, and guest appearances from Ezcodylee and TJayy. According to Pitchfork, the mixtape developed an accessible form of the rage genre. On March 6, 2026, the deluxe version of the album, titled BloodLuxe, was released. It features an additional guest appearance from Lucy Bedroque.

== Background and release ==
Slayr grew up in North Philadelphia before later moving to nearby suburban areas. During his adolescence, he spent significant time online and had learned music production through internet communities and communication platforms such as Discord. Before releasing Half Blood, Slayr had released several projects connected to a mythology-themed series, including Chaos [B4 Gaia], Gaia, and Gaia 2. His interest in Greek mythology had developed through media such as the Percy Jackson book series and video games, including God of War. On May 30, 2025, McDonald released HeavenTunes. Lockehearts disbanded around this time. Later that year, he began to work on Half Blood. Half Blood was initially planned as a shorter extended play titled Gaia 2.5 and intended as an interim release to precede his future studio album. Most of the songs for Half Blood were recorded between September to October 2025. The original version of Half Blood was planned to contain 16 tracks, before being trimmed down to 12 for release. The additional 4 tracks were later released under the name Luxe 0.1. During development, the project expanded into a full-length mixtape. Slayr stated that "Demigod" was originally intended to serve as the opening track, but after writing "Love Blur" approximately one week before release, he replaced it as the opener because he wanted a more impactful introduction.

Half Blood was released on November 5, 2025. The mixtape gained attention through online reaction videos and viral sharing, which contributed to a significant increase in listeners and streaming activity. McDonald first announced a deluxe edition to Half Blood on December 17, 2025 with the title of BloodLuxe, originally planned for a December release, but delayed due to him getting sick with the flu. This was announced again in early 2026. The release arrived amid online discussion surrounding deluxe albums, with Slayr indicating that the project would function as a new mixtape rather than a deluxe edition of Half Blood. On January 14, the original Half Blood mixtape was taken down due to sampling issues with the song "Power 4", which further delayed BloodLuxe's release. On February 25, it was announced that BloodLuxe would release on March 6, with a trailer attached for the project. BloodLuxe was released on March 6, 2026, featuring an additional appearance from Lucy Bedroque. From August 1 to September 15, 2026, Slayr is embarking on the Half Blood Tour of North America in support of the mixtape, marking his first headlining tour. McDonald has stated that Half Blood was intended to be a bridge while he works on Gaia 3, which is expected to be his next project after BloodLuxe.

Slayr performing live at Rolling Loud Orlando in 2026.

Following the mixtape's release, McDonald made an appearance at PlaqueBoyMax's New York City show on January 22, 2026 as a guest performer, where, at the concert, he would perform material off of the mixtape. A week after the release of BloodLuxe, McDonald performed a show at the Echoplex on March 13, 2026, where he would perform more material from both the standard and deluxe releases. Slayr then made his debut at Rolling Loud 2026 in Orlando, Florida, where he would perform more material off the projects for fans.

== Composition ==
=== Overview ===
Half Blood is a trap, rage, and digicore mixtape, drawing influence from video game soundtracks and internet-based music scenes. Critics have identified influences from SoundCloud-era artists such as XXXTentacion, Lil Uzi Vert, and Juice Wrld, while identifying Lil Tecca as a particularly visible stylistic reference point. The production often incorporates abrupt stylistic transitions and layered arrangements. Lyrically, the projects include themes common to underground rap, such as braggadocio, relationships, and references to fame and success. Mano Sundaresan of Pitchfork described the track "Brain Fog" from BloodLuxe as moving from 8-bit-style melodies to rage rap and then to electronic-pop. Slayr's songwriting approach is influenced by video game soundtracks, which he said influenced his use of changing musical intensity within songs. Slayr has cited series such as Sonic the Hedgehog, Final Fantasy, and Kingdom Hearts as important influences on his music. The artwork for Half Blood was inspired by the Japanese horror game series Corpse Party, reflecting Slayr's broader interest in gaming culture. Both projects are described for their genre-blending production and stylistic experimentation within contemporary underground rap.

=== Songs ===
"Power 4"
"Power 4" emphasizes Slayr's songwriting, with its production and melodies highlighting his ability to make the underground sound more accessible.

Half Blood opens with "Love Blur", which incorporates melodies that become "extra syrupy", reflecting the mixtape's video game–influenced aesthetic. "Demigod" was described by Sundaresan as approximating the feeling of "side-scrolling madness" through its shifting musical structure. "Sloppy Joe" was described as featuring "irresistible singalong melodies", and Yannik Gölz of laut.de compared the song to Uzi's "Do What I Want" (2016). On "Never Go Down", Sundaresan described Slayr's vocal performance as "full-throttle". "Power 4" was described as demonstrating Slayr's songwriting and his ability to make the underground sound more accessible. "Holding" similarly emphasizes melody, with critics pointing to its prominent singalong hook; Gölz compared the track to Uzi's "You Was Right" (2016). "The Sky" was described as a "dramatic Auto-Tune ballad" featuring keyboard lines compared to the style associated with producer Mike Dean.

The reissue, BloodLuxe, opens with "Brain Fog", which moves through several distinct sections. Sundaresan described the track as beginning with an 8-bit-style melody before shifting into a rage rap passage and later transitioning into a pop-oriented electronic segment. "Hard Knock" includes humorous lyrical references and contains lines such as "I'm getting fried like a Krabby Patty / Hard knock life, yeah, shoutout Annie", which Gölz cited as an example of Slayr's playful writing. "Flashout Freestyle" was described by Anthony Fantano of The Needle Drop as exemplifying the rage style through its energetic production and confident vocal delivery. He highlighted its incorporation of metal guitar riffs and double-bass drumming and interpreted the repeated lyric "fuck the repetition" as reflecting Slayr's self-awareness and artistic direction. On "Toxic", Fantano identified stylistic similarities to Future alongside video game–inspired synthesizer melodies. "Eyesight" was compared to the melodic style of early Trippie Redd, with Fantano highlighting its synthesizer-driven production and praising Slayr's vocal performance. "Paint a Picture" was described by Fantano as having pop appeal that contrasts with the rest of the mixtape. On "Brand New", Slayr performs "dexterous, highly processed vocal runs" that Sundaresan described as skipping and fluttering around "kangarooing" 808 bass. "Racks" was described by Sundaresan as a "perfectly constructed genre" example that emphasizes tight song structure and melodic hooks. "Died but Came Back" features Slayr performing alongside a Kasane Teto vocaloid voice over a heavy bassline, which Sundaresan compared to Uzi's Pink Tape (2023).

== Critical reception ==
Professional ratings
Review scores
Source	Rating
laut.de	4/5 stars
Pitchfork	6.7/10
The Needle Drop	8/10

Half Blood was met with generally positive reviews. Reviews praised Slayr's technical execution, including tightly structured songs, melodic hooks, and heavily processed vocals. Sundaresan of Pitchfork reviewed the deluxe edition, rating it 6.7 out of 10, stating that Slayr showcased "tight song structure, soaring hooks, and expertly rapped verses", while also arguing that the emphasis on production technique can sometimes overshadow emotional expression. He also described the mixtape as a commercially accessible form of rage rap, stating that Slayr made "maximalist, crowd-pleasing rage rap that prioritizes craft over feeling". In a review for laut.de, Gölz characterized Half Blood as part of a trend toward increasingly maximalist production in contemporary hip-hop but argued that Slayr distinguishes himself through an emphasis on songwriting and structure. He praised the mixtape's stylistic diversity and melodic writing, comparing Slayr's approach to artists such as Lil Uzi Vert, XXXTentacion, and Travis Scott.

Fantano of The Needle Drop was positive in his review of Half Blood, giving the mixtape an 8 out of 10. He wrote that the mixtape sounds "refreshing" compared to the usual rage rap produced in the underground rap scene. He praised Slayr's energy, catchy vocal delivery, and improved musical range and contrasted it with what he characterized as the generic "Opium copycat" style, as well as its crossover appeal. David Crone of AllMusic praised the mixtape, describing it as inventive, genre-bending, and refined. Antonio Johri of Complex included Half Blood among the best rap albums of 2026 so far, praising Slayr's pop sensibilities. Similarly, Alexander Cole of HotNewHipHop ranked Half Blood 22nd on the publication's "The 25 Best Rap Albums of 2026 So Far" list, praising the mixtape's accessibility, experimentation, melodic writing, and stylistic range and describing Slayr as an artist with potential for mainstream success.

== Track listing ==
Half Blood track listing
No.	Title	Writer(s)	Producer(s)	Length
1.	"Love Blur"	Evan McDonald; Ayub Hussein	Slayr; Waera	2:46
2.	"Demigod"	McDonald; Bbysizzun; Break64bit; Casketz; Dani Kiyoko	Bbysizzun; Break64bit; Casketz; Dani Kiyoko; Slayr	2:47
3.	"Sloppy Joe"	McDonald; Hussein	Slayr; Waera	2:26
4.	"Never Go Down"	McDonald; Hussein	Waera	2:00
5.	"Wipe Yo Nose" (with Ezcodylee)	McDonald; Ethan Graham; Marek	Chris Marek; Slayr	3:08
6.	"24/7"	McDonald	Slayr	2:06
7.	"Phone (Interlude)" (with TJayy)	McDonald; TJayy	Slayr	2:08
8.	"Power 4"	McDonald	Slayr	1:40
9.	"Holding"	McDonald; Dwayne Bryan; Hussein	Doxxmade; Slayr; Waera	2:33
10.	"Death by MP3"	McDonald; Hussein	Slayr; Waera	2:35
11.	"The Sky"	McDonald; Isaiah Dawson; Jackwya; Hussein	808toofly; Jackwya; Slayr; Waera	3:39
12.	"Set in Stone"	McDonald; Hussein	Slayr; Waera	2:03
Total length:				29:58

SoundCloud bonus edition
No.	Title	Writer(s)	Producer(s)	Length
13.	"If I Ever"	McDonald; Carl Martin	Slayr	0:55
Total length:				30:53

Half Blood (BloodLuxe) track listing
No.	Title	Writer(s)	Producer(s)	Length
1.	"Brain Fog"	McDonald; M8I; Hussein	M8I; Slayr; Waera	2:25
2.	"Hard Knock"	McDonald; Bryan	Doxxmade; Slayr	2:41
3.	"Flashout Freestyle"	McDonald; Marek; Kay Boba	Marek; Kay Boba; Slayr	2:54
4.	"Daytona" (with Lucy Bedroque)	McDonald; Jeremiah Mark; Marek; M8I	Marek; M8I; Slayr	2:44
5.	"Toxic"	McDonald; Jackwya; Hussein	Jackwya; Slayr; Waera	4:29
6.	"Eyesight"	McDonald; Dawson; Jackwya	808toofly; Jackwya; Slayr	2:25
7.	"Brand New"	McDonald; Hussein	Slayr; Waera	1:55
8.	"Racks"	McDonald; Michael-Raymond Taylor	Prettifun; Slayr	2:38
9.	"Paint a Picture"	McDonald; Hussein	Slayr; Waera	2:19
10.	"Died but Came Back"	McDonald; M8I; Hussein	M8I; Slayr; Waera	2:18
Total length:				26:48

=== Notes ===
- "24/7" and "Power 4" were both removed from streaming platforms for a period of time in 2026 due to sample clearance issues. However, both songs were eventually cleared and re-released, with the latter being released as a standalone single on April 29.

=== Sample credits ===
- "Love Blur" contains samples from "純恋愛のインゴット (Pure Love Ingot)", written and performed by Tuki.
- "Phone (Interlude)" contains samples from "Homeswitcher", written and performed by Jane Remover and Kmoe.
- "24/7" contains interpolations from the unreleased song "XTC (Cartier Lens)", written and performed by Playboi Carti.
- "Power 4" contains samples from "What I Believe", written and performed by John and Korey Cooper.
- The chorus of "Hard Knock" contains interpolations from the chorus of "On That Time", written and performed by Playboi Carti.
- "Paint a Picture" contains samples from "Places", written and performed by Michael Huang as the soundtrack for the series Battle for Dream Island.

== Release history ==
Release history for Half Blood
Region	Date	Label(s)	Format(s)	Edition
Various	November 5, 2025	Self-released	Digital download; streaming	Half Blood
Various	January 20, 2026	Columbia	Digital download; streaming	Half Blood streaming service re-release
Various	March 6, 2026	Columbia	Digital download; streaming	BloodLuxe

== Personnel ==
Credits adapted from Tidal.

- Slayr - vocals, producer (all tracks except "Never Go Down"), engineering, mixing, mastering.
- 808toofly - producer (11)
- Bbysizzun - producer (2)
- Break64bit - producer (2)
- Casketz - producer (2)
- Chris Marek - producer (5)
- Dani Kiyoko - producer (2)
- Doxxmade - producer (9)
- Ezcodylee - vocals (5)
- Jackwya - producer (11)
- TJayy - vocals (7)
- Waera - producer (1, 3, 4, 9, 10, 11, 12)
