= Slayr =

American rapper and singer (born 2007)

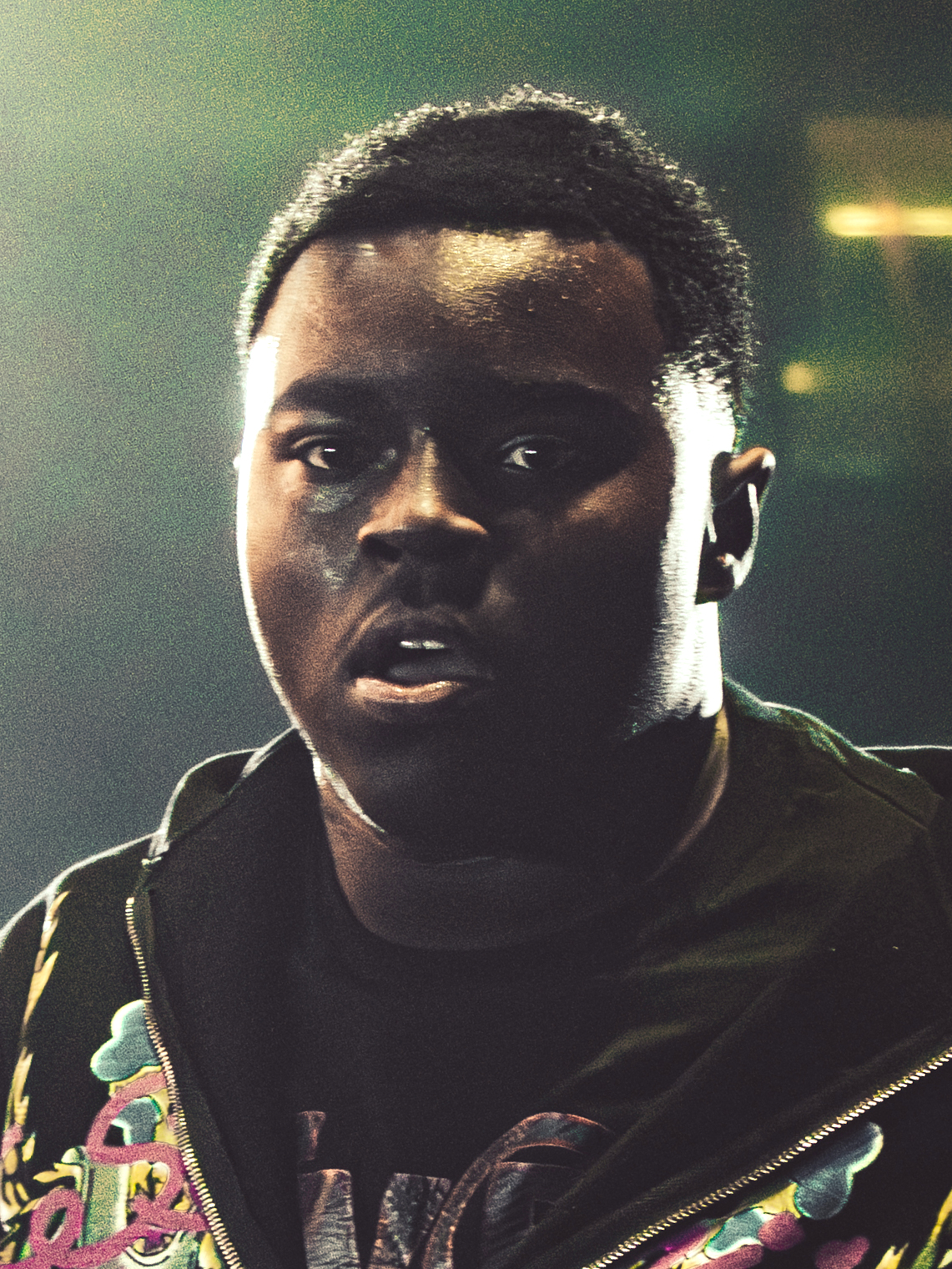
- Slayr in 2026

Background information
- Also known as: countdragons; Slayer77
- Born: Evan McDonald; May 22, 2007 (age 19); Philadelphia, Pennsylvania, U.S
- Genres: Rage; trap; digicore; hyperpop; EDM trap
- Occupations: Rapper; singer; songwriter; producer
- Years active: 2018–present
- Label: Columbia (Note: Although streaming platforms attribute the phonographic copyright solely to Slayr, he is signed to Columbia Records.)
- Formerly of: lockehearts

Evan McDonald (born May 22, 2007), known professionally as slayr, is an American rapper, singer, and record producer from Philadelphia. He rose to fame in late 2025 following the release of his mixtape Half Blood, and later followed through with its reissue BloodLuxe, both of which received critical acclaim from media outlets for their execution, structure, and diversity of genres.

== Early life ==
McDonald is from Philadelphia, Pennsylvania. Both of his parents are Jamaican immigrants. He grew up in Philadelphia and was interested in video games such as Sonic Colors and Kingdom Hearts; he has credited anime such as Mob Psycho 100, and video game soundtracks with getting him into music. He has cited Crush 40, who developed many songs for the Sonic franchise during the 2000s, as his introduction to rock music. He has also cited Lil Uzi Vert as his introduction to rap music around 2015. McDonald later started experimenting with music inside FL Studio. He describes his childhood as "relatively cool". Exposed to music at an early age, he started taking piano lessons around age five. His mother provided him with a keyboard, which he says is why he knows how to produce.

McDonald credits the death of XXXTentacion in 2018 as what inspired him to start making music. McDonald began making music on GarageBand at the age of 11, deciding to pursue music as a serious career just a few weeks later. His mother was initially unsupportive, instead preferring that McDonald make orchestral music. He has stated that Percy Jackson and God Of War got him into mythology, which would later become a prevalent theme in projects such as his Gaia series and Half Blood.

== Career ==
=== 2021–2024: Career beginnings and Gaia ===
McDonald first became involved in music through the online messaging app Discord. His first viral song, "Fourth Gear Cypher", with Yung Fazo, OsmKapo, and TheHxliday, was released in 2021. Following the single's success, McDonald released his third mixtape Gaia in 2023. It was inspired by artists Pi'erre Bourne and Kanye West. He has described the mixtape as a major development for his sound. McDonald would participate in diss wars during this time.

Between the releases of Gaia and Gaia 2, McDonald released three more projects: Stay Safe, 17, and Enter My Mind for a Second. During this time, McDonald says that he would watch T-Pain live streams in order to study Auto-Tune. He has described the production on Gaia 2 as "self-produced"; additionally stating that Gaia 2 was initially planned to contain "Ian type beat crazy bullshit." Gaia 2 released on October 4, 2024. In an interview, he stated that he was working on another album that he expected to drop in December of that year; however, this did not release. During this era, he would become a frequent collaborator of American rapper and streamer PlaqueBoyMax, appearing on multiple of his song wars.

=== 2025–present: Major releases, performances, and record deal ===
In 2025, McDonald released his sixth mixtape Half Blood. Subsequently, he has garnered millions of views on YouTube and "been subjected to irrational aura debates." McDonald also signed a major label deal, which was later revealed to be with Columbia Records. On March 6, 2026, it was reissued as Half Blood (Bloodluxe), featuring 10 additional songs.

In April 2026, Pitchfork reviewed Half Blood (Bloodluxe), rating it a 6.7. Writer Mano Sundaresan argued that the mixtape reflected a commercial accessible take on the rage rap genre, stating that McDonald made "maximalist, crowd-pleasing rage rap that prioritizes craft over feeling." He added that, "if rage rap ever makes its way onto a Target store playlist, it might sound a little like Slayr." On May 10, 2026, McDonald performed at Rolling Loud in Orlando, Florida. On June 13, 2026, McDonald performed at Summer Smash 2026, he also made a guest appearance on PlaqueBoyMax's set as well. On June 17, McDonald was featured on the track "Constantly" alongside Tiffany Day. His debut headlining tour, in support of Half Blood, is scheduled to begin in August 2026 in San Francisco and conclude in September 2026 in Milwaukee, the tour will have Egobreak as the main DJ to help support throughout the tour. On July 2, 2026, during Anime Expo 2026 in Los Angeles, California, it was announced that Slayr, alongside other notable artists will be featured on the upcoming 2026 fall EP Beyond Borders Vol.1: Emerge Mode Miku.

Then, on July 10, 2026, he released Avant Nova, a six-track EP with production from Underscores, and a single feature from Prettifun. In August 2026, McDonald released "Keep Me Going (Birdbrain)", which samples "Birdbrain" by the American musician Jamie Paige, featuring vocals produced using the Synthesizer V voicebank Kasane Teto. He would then follow up with "Try and Fail" with SoFaygo, and would then make a guest appearance on Beyond Border's track "Light", alongside Hatsune Miku, Xamiya, and Picco.

== Artistry ==
=== Influences and musical style ===
McDonald's music combines trap, rage, and digicore with influences from video game soundtracks and EDM. As noted by The Fader, his music contains a genre blending approach, which mirrors artists such as Skaiwater and 100 gecs. Writing for Pitchfork, Mano Sundaresan notes his transitions parallel those on Lil Tecca's 2023 album Tec. McDonald himself has described his music "more of a fusion than just a style." McDonald has cited Lil Uzi Vert, XXXTentacion, Kanye West, Playboi Carti, Ken Carson, and SoFaygo as influences on his music. Production wise, McDonald cited Pi'erre Bourne and Kanye West, Travis Scott, F1lthy, Metro Boomin, and Working on Dying as his influences.

=== Reception ===
His music has generated positive reviews, with fans and critics praising his creativity. Additionally, McDonald was listed as one of the "32 coolest artists of 2026" by The Fader. On June 24, 2026, it was announced that McDonald was featured in the Freshman XXL class of 2026. On August 4, 2026, Complex labeled McDonald as the 94th hottest rapper in their "100 hottest rappers right now" list.

== Discography ==
=== Mixtapes ===
Title	Album details
Lost Files (Exclusives)	Released: April 22, 2022; Label: Self-released; Format: Digital download, streaming
BeFour My Creation	Released: August 17, 2022; Label: Self-released; Format: Digital download, streaming
Gaia	Released: May 22, 2023; Label: Self-released; Format: Digital download, streaming
Stay Safe	Released: February 10, 2024; Label: Self-released; Format: Digital download, streaming
Gaia 2	Released: October 4, 2024; Label: Self-released; Format: Digital download, streaming (Note: Project type unknown. Listed as an album on Spotify and Youtube Music, but EP on SoundCloud)
HeavenTunes	Released: May 30, 2025; Label: Self-released; Format: Digital download, streaming
Half Blood	Released: November 5, 2025; Label: Self-released; Format: Digital download, streaming
NO PEACE (as user384902340)	Released: November 20, 2026; Label: Self-released; Format: Digital download, streaming

=== Reissues ===
Title	Album details
Half Blood (BloodLuxe)	Released: March 6, 2026; Label: Columbia; Format: Digital download, streaming

=== EPs ===
Title	EP details
Destruction	Released: April 30, 2022; Label: Self-released; Format: Digital download, streaming
Chaos (#B4Gaia)	Released: February 8, 2023; Label: Self-released; Format: Digital download, streaming
#B4G2	Released: 2023; Label: Self-released; Format: Digital download, streaming
17	Released: May 22, 2024; Label: Self-released; Format: Digital download, streaming
Enter My Mind for a Second	Released: July 19, 2024; Label: Self-released; Format: Digital download, streaming
Luxe 0.1 (as Countdragons)	Released: December 21, 2025; Label: Self-released; Format: Digital download, streaming
Avant Nova	Released: July 10, 2026; Label: Columbia; Format: Digital download, streaming
NOVA 0.1 (as user384902340)	Released: November 19, 2026; Label: Self-released; Format: Digital download, streaming

=== Singles ===
Title	Year	Peak chart positions	Album
Title	Year	NZ Hot	Album
"Fourth Gear Cypher!" (with Yung Fazo, OsmKapo and TheHxliday)	2021	—	Lost Files (Exclusives)
"Feel the Thrill"	2022	—	Lost Files (Exclusives)
"Got Me Thinking"	2022	—	Non-album singles
"Victorious! Freestyle"	2022	—	Non-album singles
"Zah Zah"	2022	—	Non-album singles
"See It All"	2022	—	BeFour My Creation
"Fairy Dust"	2022	—	BeFour My Creation
"#DumbDumb"	2022	—	BeFour My Creation
"Idol"	2022	—	BeFour My Creation
"A King Needs a Throne"	2022	—	Non-album singles
"Sweep"	2023	—	Non-album singles
"X" (with 666Rehab and Kaisani)	2024	—	Non-album singles
"Jealous" (with Kaisani)	2024	—	Non-album singles
"Poster Child (Power 3)"	2025	—	Non-album singles
"Missedplay"	2025	—	Non-album singles
"Move Her Body"	2025	—	Non-album singles
"Body Parts"	2025	—	Non-album singles
"Set in Stone"	2025	—	Half Blood
"Just Like Mine"	2025	—	Non-album singles
"Slay Pro"	2025	—	Non-album singles
"Turn It Up"	2026	—	Non-album singles
"Power 4"	2026	—	Half Blood
"Homerunner"	2026	—	Non-album singles
"Constantly" (with Tiffany Day)	2026	—	Non-album singles
"Keep Me Going (Birdbrain)"	2026	8	Non-album singles
"Try and Fail" (with SoFaygo)	2026	—	Non-album singles
"Light" (with Hatsune Miku, Picco, and Xamiya)	2026	—	EMERGE M♡DE MIKU
"Remember Them Days"	2026	—	Non-album singles
"1v1"(with PlaqueBoyMax)	2026	—	Non-album singles
"Bowling"(with Rexv2)	2026	—	Non-album singles

=== Other charted songs ===
List of other charted songs, with selected chart positions shown
Title	Year	Peak chart positions	Album
Title	Year	NZ Hot	Album
"Promise"	2026	31	Avant Nova
