= Che (rapper) =

American rapper (born 2006)

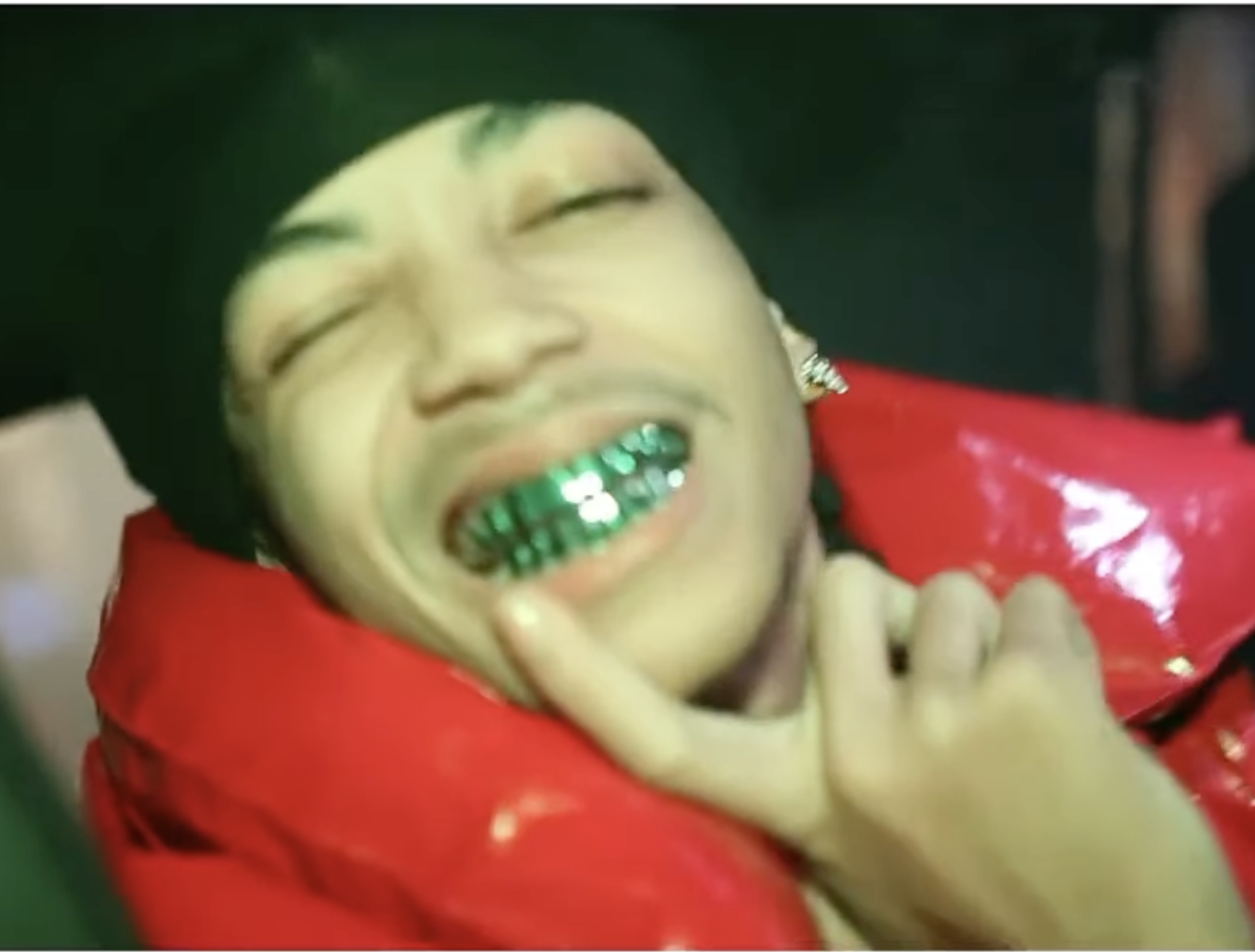
- Che in 2025

Background information
- Also known as: Sayso; cheRomani+; Murkio!; Bass Killer; Yafioso; PraiseChe
- Born: Chase Shaun Mitchell; August 29, 2006 (age 20); Atlanta, Georgia, U.S.
- Genre: Rage
- Occupations: Rapper; singer; songwriter; producer
- Years active: 2020–present
- Label: 10K Projects
- Website: praiseche.com

Chase Shaun Mitchell (born August 29, 2006), known professionally as Che, is an American rapper, songwriter, and producer from Atlanta, Georgia. He first gained traction in late 2021 through viral tracks on TikTok and streaming platforms, particularly for his song "Agenda", and later saw additional success in 2024 with "Miley Cyrus" and "Pizza Time".

== Early life ==
Chase Shaun Mitchell was born on August 29, 2006, in Atlanta, Georgia. As a kid, Mitchell uploaded comedic skits onto YouTube under the name "SuperInk 4".

== Career ==
=== 2020–2022: Career beginnings and breakthrough ===
Che originally began releasing music to SoundCloud under the alias "Murkio!" in 2021. He was affiliated with the collective 4ersona which also featured rappers Skaiwater, Rich Amiri, and Prettifun. His early work was influenced by the plugg and rage rap scenes. In August 2021, he gained attention with his remix of Yeat's "Off Tha Lot", which went viral on TikTok and amassed millions of streams.

In December 2021, Mitchell's single "Agenda" was released and received significant attention on social media. Following the track's success, he followed up with a sequel, "The Final Agenda", which also garnered traction on social media. In May 2022, he released his debut EP, titled 3.

=== 2023: Closed Captions and Crueger ===
By 2023, Mitchell started settling on his current moniker with his signing to 10K Projects. In February 2023, he released "Blac Chyna", the lead single from his debut mixtape, Closed Captions; a week prior the release of the mixtape, he released "Bluberry Bakwood", as a rollout single along with a music video. Later in the year, Mitchell released his third EP, Crueger. Inspired by the early drill sound of Chief Keef, the project marked a change into maximalist, layered production. Working closely with producer CXO, Mitchell incorporated dense, orchestral textures with hi-hats, distorted bass, and atmospheric synths. The EP drew attention from critics for its sound design and energy.

=== 2024–2025: Sayso Says, Rest in Bass, and Encore ===
On March 7, 2024, Mitchell released "Miley Cyrus", one of the rollout singles for his debut album Sayso Says, along with a music video released on April 4 directed by NoahSoCold, featuring visuals created with generative AI. He then released "Pizza Time", along with a music video on May 29; like "Miley Cyrus", the song received considerable success online and positive reception from Pitchfork. On August 30, Mitchell released his debut studio album, Sayso Says, an experimental project that built on the momentum of Crueger. The album tells the story of Mitchell's evil alter-ego (dubbed "Sayso" from Crueger) and draws heavy inspiration from electronic bands such as Crystal Castles and You Love Her, featuring more polished self-production and refined songwriting.

On July 18, 2025, Mitchell released his second studio album, Rest in Bass. It received positive reviews, with Pitchfork rating it an 8.3, and TheNeedleDrop rating it a light 7. Mitchell announced a 16-date USA tour for the album on July 29. On October 26, Che, along with Young Dabo, PlaqueBoyMax, and Xaviersobased met at ComplexCon 2025 to record the track "Motto". Che along with Xaviersobased also opened for Yeat's set at ComplexCon to perform their track "Mannequin". On December 25, the day of Christmas, Che released deluxe edition of Rest in Bass, titled Rest in Bass: Encore, which saw an introduction of 14 new tracks, as well as a new feature from OsamaSon.

=== 2026–present: Fully Loaded, Para'dies, and Empty Clip ===
On March 26, 2026, Che released a two-track single consisting of "Million Dollar Mansion" and "Promoting Violence". Immediately after, he released an EP, titled Fully Loaded. The two tracks he released prior were featured on the EP, and three new tracks were also added. On April 24, Che released a two-track EP titled Para'dies, which featured two new tracks, "Tell U Sum" and "Nosferatu". On June 19, he released another experimental EP titled Empty Clip, featuring the tracks "Like Lil Mexico", "Tuesday" (later titled “2sday”), "DMX" "Og Ginobili", and "Los Santos". On October 30, 2026, American rapper Nettspend released his EP Virginia Creeper, which featured the track "Nite Nite"; it track was entirely self-produced by Che.

== Musical style ==
Che has cited Lil Tecca, Chief Keef, Playboi Carti, Lil Uzi Vert, and Paramore as his early musical inspirations. His musical style is often characterized by a blend of rage, drill, hyper-maximalist production, and experimental sound design. His sound includes "glitchy, fast-paced textures", sounds and arrangements designed to spike dopamine, with little silence or breathing room in the production. Che's vocal delivery is often loud, aggressive, and high-pitched, with distortion in both vocals and beats. Rather than focusing purely on complex lyricism, Che's music often puts emphasis on mood, atmosphere, and the feeling created by the production.

== Personal life ==
=== Nine Vicious altercation ===
In July 2026, Che and fellow rapper Nine Vicious, were involved in a public altercation, following an online ongoing feud. Before it started, Social media users recorded two of them and their crew getting into a physical confrontation inside a department store, close to an Balenciaga kiosk. After both of them left, in August 2026, Nine Vicious posted an Instagram story of a chain, later confirmed to be Che's DJ's chain. Che responded to this by posting a story of his own chain, showcasing that his chain from Alex Moss was still on his neck.

== Discography ==
=== Studio albums ===
- Sayso Says (2024)
- Rest in Bass (2025)
