= Uncomfy (song) =

2025 song by Xaviersobased featuring OsamaSon

Song by Xaviersobased featuring OsamaSon

from the EP Once More
- Released: August 1, 2025
- Genre: Hip-hop; Shoegaze
- Length: 2:55
- Label: Surf Gang; Atlantic
- Songwriters: Xavier Lopez; Amari Middleton; Alexander Lopez; Nils Henrik Jerry Sunding
- Producer: Nurse

Audio video
- "Uncomfy" on YouTube

"Uncomfy" (stylized in all lowercase) is a song by the American rapper Xaviersobased, featuring fellow American rapper OsamaSon, from his surprise released extended play (EP) Once More. Released as the third track on August 1, 2025, through Surf Gang and Atlantic Records. The song was written by Xaviersobased, OsamaSon, and produced by Nurse.

"Uncomfy" is a hip-hop song that is built around shoegaze-style guitar sounds, fuzzy pedals, jerk clicks, and blown-out and bitcrushed 808s. Across the track, the duo frequently flexes their lavish lifestyle while sending threats to anyone who may come between them. On their year-end lists, Pitchfork ranked "Uncomfy" as the ninth best song on their "40 Best Rap Songs of 2025" ranking, while it was ranked 41st on its "The 100 Best Songs of 2025" ranking.

== Background and release ==
Xaviersobased, an American rapper from New York, emerged as a rapper in the 2020s underground rap scene after he became affiliated with online rap collectives Jewelxxet and Novagang. A year later, he formed 1c34 with his friends whom he was playing THUG Pro with. Following a steady slew of musical releases, Xaviersobased gained traction online with the release of his track "Patchmade" which helped popularize the jerk microgenre. Following a successful 2023 and entering 2024, Xaviersobased would follow through with releases, such as "40", with Evilgiane and Nettspend, and his 15-track mixtape Keep It Goin Xav, upon release, it generated positive reviews from media publications.

After the release of With 2 and "Impact" with Nettspend, Xaviersobased teamed up with Columbus rapper OsamaSon to release their first official collaborative EP BasedSlime together. It was released on April 28, 2025, and was hosted by DJ Rennesey, a close friend of Xaviersobased. Then, on August 1, 2025, Xaviersobased surprise released Once More through Surf Gang and Atlantic, in an accompanying Instagram post, Xaviersobased had stated that he had intended to release the EP as the precursor to his studio album release.

== Composition and lyrics ==
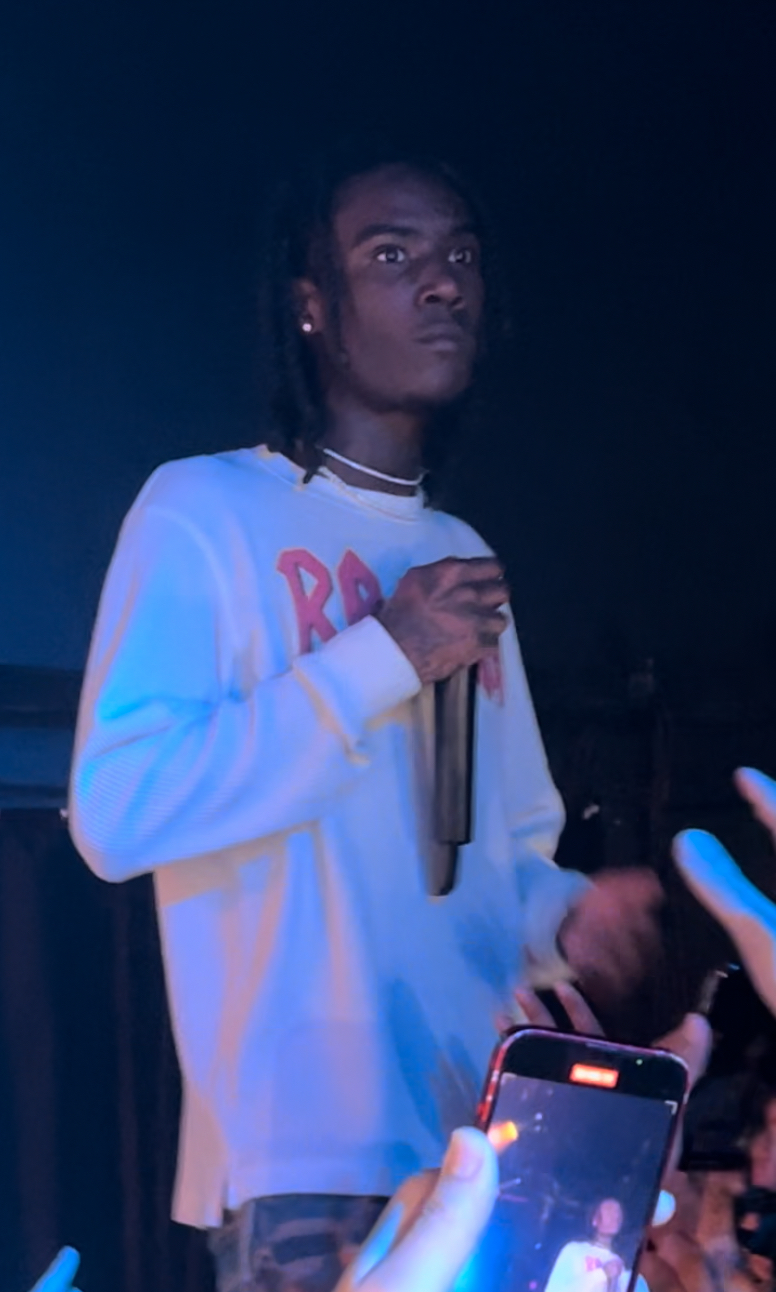
The track features a verse from OsamaSon, who stepped away from his usual rage style of music.

"Uncomfy" is a two-minute and 55-second-long song. Xaviersobased and OsamaSon co-wrote the song with Nurse, who handled the music production on the track. It's a hip-hop track that features some shoegaze influence throughout. The track is notably driven by its built around shoegaze-style guitar sounds, fuzzy pedals, jerk clicks, and blown-out and bitcrushed 808s.

According to Olivier Lafontant of Pitchfork, he wrote that the duo embodies what it truly means to embrace the shoegaze sound. Elaina Bernstein of Hypebeast wrote that the shoegaze-influenced beats are scattered all across the EP. Jordan Darville of The Fader also expressed similar sentiment to what Lafontant and Bernstein said about the shoegaze influence on the track. Lyrically, "Uncomfy" sees the duo frequently flexes their lavish lifestyle while sending threats to anyone who may come between them. Serving as a new a new approach for OsamaSon, the track sees him step out of his usual rage-rap comfort zone. He gets a straight-faced verse instead of his usual frantic, ad-lib-heavy delivery. He raps about keeping a poker face for his haters, while Xaviersobased raps about a major-label debut, a national tour, and meeting Eastern European women, along with the frustrations of the lavish lifestyle he lives. According to Tyler Linares of Pitchfork, he praised Xaviersobased's ad-libs and OsamaSon's bragging, stating that together they make the song feel hopeful.

== Critical reception ==
Upon release, "Uncomfy" generated positive reviews from music journalists. According to Lafontant, he wrote that "Uncomfy" serves as the EP's best moment; he praised the track's instrumental, writing that it was one of the best instrumentals he's heard so far. Darville expected it to get most of the attention because of the instrumental and the feature provided by OsamaSon. According to Alex Suskind of Pitchfork, he called "Uncomfy" the EP's breakout single. Additionally, on their year-end lists, Pitchfork named "Uncomfy" as one of "The 40 Best Rap Songs of 2025", while the track was named the 41st best song on their "The 100 Best Songs of 2025" list.

== Credits ==
Credits adapted from Apple Music, and Tidal.

- Xavier Lopez – vocals, songwriting
- Amari Middleton – vocals, songwriting
- Alexander "Nurse" Lopez – production, songwriting
- Nils Henrik Jerry Sunding – songwriting
