= Once More (EP) =

2025 EP by Xaviersobased

EP by Xaviersobased
- Released: August 1, 2025
- Genre: Hip-hop
- Length: 13:20
- Labels: Surf Gang; Atlantic
- Producers: 444jet; Cru; Nurse; Pyro; SS3bby; Tina; Xaviersobased

Xaviersobased chronology
With 2 (2024)	Once More (2025)	Xavier (2026)

Once More is an extended play (EP) by the American rapper Xaviersobased. It was surprise-released on August 1, 2025, through Surf Gang Records and Atlantic Records. It is a six-track hip-hop EP that blends Internet music genres such as jerk, cloud rap, pluggnB, and hyperpop.

The EP was promoted with the release of a music video for "Worth It", and an accompanying North American tour, the Riverside Tour, in November and December 2025. Music critics praised the EP as a stylistic refinement of Xaviersobased's sound, and it was listed as one of the best EPs of 2025 by Our Culture Mag.

== Background and release ==
After garnering attention with his mixtapes Keep It Going Xav and With 2 and the single "40" with Nettspend and Evilgiane in 2024, Xaviersobased signed a record deal with Atlantic Records in 2025. On August 1 that year, he surprise-released Once More through Surf Gang and Atlantic as his major-label debut release. In an accompanying Instagram post, he said the EP was intended as a precursor to a new studio album, stating: "ion want yall to think that im on some mysterious shit still gon b an active summer we activee". A music video for "Worth It", directed by Allan Stoops, was released on September 19, 2025. To promote Once More, Xaviersobased embarked on the Riverside Tour of North America from November 17 to December 18, 2025, supported by Ksuuvi, DJ Rennessy, and Backend.

== Composition ==
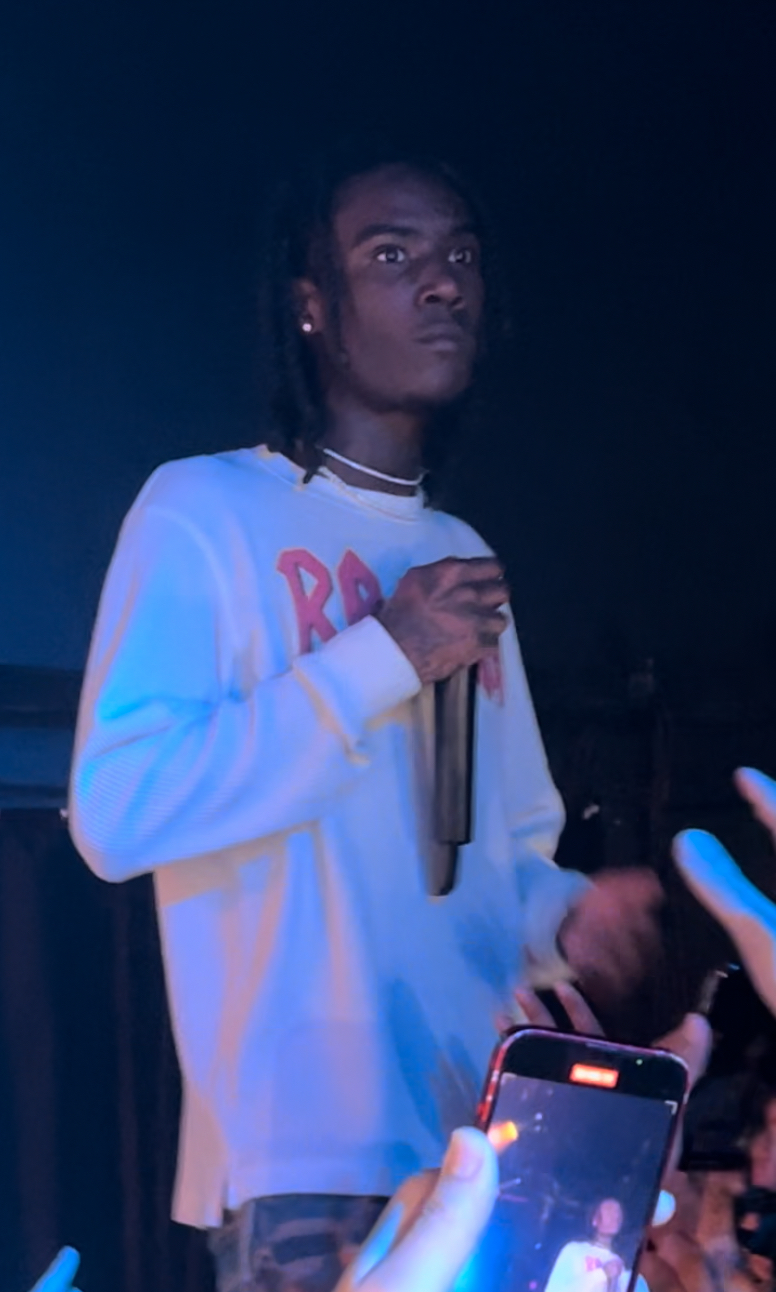
OsamaSon features on "Uncomfy".

Once More is a hip-hop EP, blending elements from several internet-era subgenres, including jerk, cloud rap, pluggnB, and hyperpop. With six tracks, these genres are interpreted according to Gabriel Bras Nevares of HotNewHipHop through "minimal", "icy", and "sharp" production choices, with sleek synth melodies and unconventional samples contributing to its experimental atmosphere. Nevares further highlighted the between Xaviersobased's "breathy" delivery and the percussive elements of its production. Lyrically, the EP maintains his characteristic brevity and lighthearted tone, with moments of surreal imagery and humor. The EP retains his post-SoundCloud era and expansion on his signature sound with increased polish and structural refinement that characterized his earlier work, such as in Keep It Goin Xav. Once More has been described by Nevares as Xaviersobased's most "ethereal" project to date. Lafontant noted that Once More refines what has been described as his "singularly unrefined style", presenting a cleaner, more melodic, and tightly curated approach without compromising the eccentricity of his earlier releases.

Pitchfork's Olivier Lafontant described Xaviersobased's vocals on "Fly" as ranging from a "deadpan whisper" to a "candy-coated warble". "Uncomfy" sees Xaviersobased and OsamaSon rap braggadociously over shoegaze-inspired textures featuring reverb-heavy guitars and feedback tones. "Red Snapper" juxtaposes gun-shot-like beats with "relatively wholesome rapping."

== Critical reception ==
Professional ratings
Review scores
Source	Rating
Pitchfork	8.0/10

Davy Reed of The Face considered Once More to be "further evidence that [Xaviersobased is] one of the most compelling experimentalists in contemporary rap." Olivier Lafontant of Pitchfork praised the EP for showcasing Xaviersobased's growth while maintaining his experimental sound, praising its "sleeker" production, the inventive shoegaze-influenced track "Uncomfy", and the rapper's ability to evolve without sacrificing his distinctive style.

Gabriel Bras Navares of HotNewHipHop described once more as "a short but nonetheless memorable experience," noting that Xaviersobased enlists Backend and OsamaSon for features on two of the six tracks. The review praised the EP's cleaner, more melodic, and polished production compared to previous releases like Keep It Goin Xav, while maintaining his signature interpretations of jerk, cloud rap, and plugg. The critic highlighted the project's ethereal quality, dynamic percussion, and inventive sampling, calling it "one of the best contemporary statements of what's captivating young rap audiences today."

Elaina Bernstein of Hypebeast wrote how Once More has a more polished sound compared to his previous releases, while retaining the raw, self-made energy of his earlier work. The review highlighted the project's sleek synth melodies and incorporation of shoegaze-influenced beats, signaling an expansion of Xaviersobased's genre profile. Our Culture Mag listed Once More as the fifteenth best EP of 2025, with Konstantinos Pappis praising its "gleeful nonsensical experimentation" and nonconformist attitude. Pitchfork also ranked "Uncomfy" as the ninth best rap song of the year.

== Track listing ==
Credits adapted from Tidal. All songs written by Xavier Lopez, producers, and features if applicable.

No.	Title	Writer(s)	Producer(s)	Length
1.	"She OMD On'na Low"	Xavier Lopez; Jet Barker	444jet	1:55
2.	"Fly" (featuring Backend)	Lopez; Jaden Gonzalez	Xaviersobased	2:29
3.	"Uncomfy" (featuring OsamaSon)	Lopez; Amari Middleton; Alexander Lopez	Nurse	2:55
4.	"Worth It"	Lopez; Dominick Anthony	Cru; Xaviersobased	1:32
5.	"Red Snapper"	Lopez; Liam Manning	Tina	2:20
6.	"I'on Kno'"	Lopez; Sebastian Emmanuel Aguilar; Cristian Emmanuel Aguilar	Pyro; SS3bby	2:07
Total length:				13:20

Notes

- All track titles are stylized in all lowercase.
- "I'on Kno'" and "She OMD On'na Low" are stylized without their apostrophes.
- "Worth It" was incorrectly listed as having a feature from OsamaSon upon its immediate release; the credit would be fixed the following day.
