= Xavier (album) =

Studio album by Xaviersobased
- Released: January 30, 2026
- Genres: New York hip-hop; jerk; cloud rap
- Length: 48:58
- Labels: 1-chance; Surf Gang; Atlantic
- Producers: Xaviersobased; Eddiepoz; Ss3bby; Ksuuvi; Cranes; Nurse; RJ12; 500xoe; Woesum; Yung Sherman; Zaytoven; Akachi; Jaylen Bee; Kylen; Rok; Jack40; Skrillex; Dylan Brady

Xaviersobased chronology
Once More (2025)	Xavier (2026)

Singles from Xavier
- 1. "iPhone 16" Released: January 23, 2026

Xavier is the debut studio album by American rapper Xaviersobased. It was released on January 30, 2026, through 1-chance, Surf Gang and Atlantic, consisting of 20 tracks, including the lead single, "iPhone 16" along with the streaming exclusive bonus track "Party At My Place". The album features collaborations with notable artists such as Skrillex, OsamaSon, Zaytoven, Rio da Yung OG and Dylan Brady.

== Background and promotion ==
In 2025, Xaviersobased signed a record deal with Atlantic Records and surprise-released Once More through 1-chance and Surf Gang as his major debut label release. The EP was promoted with a music video for "Worth It" and a North American headlining run, the Riverside Tour, which ran from November to December 2025 and featured stops in major U.S. and Canadian cities. Ending the tour later with the release of a promotional single "Walk to Me" with a music video.

To build anticipation for the album, prior to release Xaviersobased would announce the Riverside 2.0 Tour, a sequel to his 2025 Riverside Tour, with support from collective members Ksuuvi and Backend.

On January 19, 2026, Xaviersobased would later tease a snippet on social media together with the album's title stating: "#Xavier". It was later accompanied by the release of his self-produced lead single "iPhone 16", which dropped on January 23, 2026, together with a music video.

Released on January 30, 2026, the album marks Xavier's first studio album to be released under a major label, with its production shifting toward a more professional sound. In his The Fader cover story, Xavier explained that while he was not attempting to change his core sound, he was focused on "upping the sound quality" and making the music more professional. He noted that the goal for this project was to "still [push] the sound, but now we could put this in the club," effectively aiming to "Make it more — not accessible — but just package it better" for a wider audience. His manager, DJ Rennessy, described the release as a landmark moment for them, stating, "It definitely feels like we solidified ourselves with that album." Xavier stated that he never "played into" TikTok algorithms to find success, instead viewing the project as an "inflection point" after a two-year hiatus from releasing music.

On February 5, 2026, The Fader announced that a documentary film for the album was to be released. It was set to premiere on February 13. A launch party for the documentary was hosted on for the day of the release at the Vans Skate Space 198 in Brooklyn from 7-10 p.m. ET, with food, drinks, and merch of Xaviersobased being available to the public. Following the documentary's release, it was critically acclaimed, and also marked as The Fader's first documentary since 2021. The documentary was named after Xavier's 2024 mixtape Keep It Goin Xav.

Xavier would announce the Riverside 2.0 Tour in support of the album before its release. Running from March 6 to June 7, 2026 and featuring support from collective members Ksuuvi and Backend, it marked his first international headlining tour.

== Composition ==
=== Overview ===
On February 3, 2026, Pitchfork reviewed the album, stating, "Xavier is toned down a smidge, but it's him. And in a mainstream rap landscape where everyone's on podcasts doing rap-is-dead discourse and stars are racing to become the next Trump puppet, it's refreshing to see an album completely on its own wavelength inching its way toward the upper echelon of rap. There's a reality where Xavier rapping about shopping at skate shops on Canal Street or overthinking interactions with bottle girls over the "Wheel Man" claps that sound like drowned-out reggaeton could get as much attention as a Kai Cenat stream. It's even possible that there's a future where the most important thing about rap is still the music." Joe Houghton of NME wrote how Xavier is one of his most polished forms of work as of yet. He writes how Xavier isn't as reckless as some of his other works, but it still features a playful amount of production throughout. The album also showcases Xaviersobased's ability to "grasp on countless past and burgeoning musical styles." Similar to what Houghton said, Christian Eede of The Quietus felt the same way, stating how the project sees Xavier polish up on his unique sound without losing his vitality.

=== Songs ===
Houghton writes how the "pulsing wall of sound" on "Clorox" and the "dreamy skittering beats" on songs like "Negative Canthal Tilt" help keep the album fresh. He also wrote how Xaviersobased's "muddy, twinkling mixes pair well with his idiosyncratic lyrics, at once brazen, vulnerable and optimistic." While showing off his hyper awareness, he also outlandishly flaunts his wealth and hedonistic lifestyle, with lines such as "Hoes on my dick 'cause I got that self-hatred" demonstrating that very well. The power of his lyrics comes from this contrast: a detached, playful rapper persona layered over real sensitivity. Houghton affirms how Xaviersobased's distorted, off-beat flows aren't for everyone, but they reinforce the lyrics' effortless, knowing attitude. The album also showcases Xaviersobased's ability to "grasp countless past and burgeoning musical styles." With "Minute" diving into the genre of electroclash, something "Xaviersobased's mother would be proud of."

Joe Houghton, in his review on NME, states that "On "Heartfelt," co-produced by Yung Sherman and Woesum, Lopez shows a different side of Rio Da Yung Og, who sounds way more reflective than usual over a beat that feels like a cozy video game soundtrack with heavy 808s. The album really hits its stride in the second half, where features from regular collaborators like OsamaSon and Ksuuvi bring the energy up. Xaviersobased works best as an entry point into this innovative rapper-producer's world, giving a solid snapshot of Xaviersobased and the new NYC underground he's been shaping. It might not surprise longtime fans, but the album's highlights show how versatile and playful Xaviersobased can be. Even with a major-label deal, Xaviersobased hasn't changed — he's still one of the most fun and likable artists in the US underground right now." Konstantinos Pappis of Our Culture Mag wrote how "Party At My Place" is an abrasive track.

== Critical reception ==
Professional ratings
Review scores
Source	Rating
The Needle Drop	5/10 (Note: Specifically, Fantano rated it a "strong 5 to a light 6.")
NME	4/5 stars
Pitchfork	8.3/10

In a positive review for Pitchfork, critic Alphonse Pierre awarded Xavier a score of 8.3 out of 10, which ranked as the top entry in Pitchfork's "Best New Albums" list across all genres. According to Pierre, he described the project as "a cult rap record with big ambition." Pierre praised Xaviersobased's ability to expand his sound for a major-label debut while maintaining the chaotic and experimental qualities that defined his earlier work. Pierre praised Xaviersobased's artistic independence and individuality, likening the rapper to that of ASAP Rocky. Like Pierre, Joe Houghton of NME gave a positive review for the project, he awarded Xavier a four out of five, writing how it's an accessible introduction to Xaviersobased's music, Houghton described the record as the rapper's "most polished work yet," highlighting its eclectic blend of microgenre influences, playful production, and off-kilter lyricism. Although Houghton noted that the project lacked some of the "reckless experimentation" of Xaviersobased's earlier releases, it retained the artist's distinctive chaotic and DIY sensibilities.

Anthony Fantano rated the project a five out of ten, praising Xaviersobased's distinctive style within the contemporary rap underground and highlighting the album's spacious and atmospheric production, which he compared to cloud rap and the work of artists such as Bladee and Yung Lean. However, Fantano criticized the album's inconsistency, arguing that several tracks suffered from repetitive songwriting, underdeveloped ideas, and thin mixing. He also noted that Xaviersobased's lyrics often prioritized style over substance and felt that certain experimental moments and guest appearances yielded mixed results. Despite the criticisms, Fantano concluded that Xaviersobased has a unique artistic style that separates him from his contemporaries in the underground hip-hop scene. According to Pitchfork, Xavier was, so far, one of the best releases of 2026. On their "albums of the year so far" list, Christian Eede of The Quietus ranked Xavier at 21, writing how the project sees Xavier polish up on his unique lo-fi sound of jerk and plugg, but not lose the vitality he previously had in doing so.

== Track listing ==
Credits adapted from Tidal.

Xavier track listing
No.	Title	Writer(s)	Producer(s)	Length
1.	"I Don't Gotta Say It"	Xavier Lopez	Xaviersobased	2:08
2.	"iPhone 16"	X. Lopez	Xaviersobased	3:51
3.	"Harajuku"	X. Lopez	Xaviersobased	3:20
4.	"Clorox"	X. Lopez; Eduardo Pozos; Sebastian Aguilar	Eddiepoz; Ss3bby	1:32
5.	"Packs Gone"	X. Lopez; Jose Hernandez	Ksuuvi	1:57
6.	"Get The Racks Gone Then I Go Pt. 2"	X. Lopez; Owen Jablonski	Cranes	1:57
7.	"Dat Shit Fr"	X. Lopez; Aguilar	Xaviersobased; Ss3bby	1:55
8.	"Zelle You"	X. Lopez; Aguilar	Ss3bby	2:04
9.	"Minute"	X. Lopez; Hernandez; Alexander Lopez	Nurse; Xaviersobased; Ksuuvi	2:14
10.	"Wrk Wrk"	X. Lopez; Jablonski	Cranes	2:15
11.	"Tony Hawk"	X. Lopez; Ruben Santiesteban	RJ12	2:37
12.	"Wheel Man"	X. Lopez	Xaviersobased	3:05
13.	"100,000"	X. Lopez; William Holliday	500xoe	2:27
14.	"Mask On"	X. Lopez	Xaviersobased	2:45
15.	"Heartfelt" (featuring Rio da Yung OG)	X. Lopez; Da'mario Horne-McCullough; Arthur Nyqvist; Axel Tuffvesson	Woesum; Yung Sherman	2:45
16.	"Big Ben" (featuring Zaytoven)	X. Lopez; Xavier Dotson	Zaytoven	2:24
17.	"Skrap"	X. Lopez; Aguilar	Ss3bby	2:34
18.	"Give It Up" (featuring OsamaSon)	X. Lopez; Amari Middleton; Hunter Brown; Jaylen Bee; Kylen Bradshaw	Akachi; Bee; Kylen	2:23
19.	"Negative Canthal Tilt"	X. Lopez; Rok Curkovic	Rok; Xaviersobased	1:36
20.	"Seen a Lot of Things" (featuring Ksuuvi)	X. López; Hernández; Santiesteban; Yasuhiro Arai	RJ12; Jack40	2:59
Total length:				48:58

Streaming bonus track
No.	Title	Writer(s)	Producer(s)	Length
21.	"Party At My Place"	X. Lopez; Sonny Moore; Dylan Brady	Skrillex; Dylan Brady	2:21
