= Cooper B. Handy =

Massachusetts rapper and musician (born 1994)

LUCY (Cooper B. Handy)
- Handy in 2024

Background information
- Also known as: LUCY
- Born: Cooper B. Handy; February 10, 1994 (age 32); Cape Cod, Massachusetts
- Genres: Art pop; bedroom pop
- Occupations: Musician; rapper; visual artist; record producer
- Years active: 2007–present
- Labels: Many Hats Distribution; Window on the World; Surf Gang
- Member of: Club Casualties; Taxidermists; the Manic Pixies; Safe Mind

Cooper B. Handy (born February 10, 1994), known professionally as LUCY, is an American musician, singer-songwriter and producer based in Massachusetts. He is a member of groups such as Taxidermists, Club Casualties, the Manic Pixies and Safe Mind.

Handy has collaborated with artists such as Boy Harsher, Whitearmor, Evilgiane and the collective Surf Gang.

== Early life ==
Cooper B. Handy was born in Cape Cod, Massachusetts on February 10, 1994.

== Career ==
=== 2000s–2010s ===
In 2007, Handy met Salvadore McNamara on a MySpace page, and the pair quickly began a friendship, bonding over their shared love of music. At just 13 years old, the duo became a part of New England's DIY scene, releasing music under the project "Taxidermists". In 2009, while attending high school, Cooper Handy began a Facebook page called "lucy", the alias was constructed as a way to keep the project anonymous as there was not much of a music scene in Cape Cod at the time.

In 2010, Handy began collaborating with childhood friends and releasing material on Dark World Records, a local independent record label founded by rapper DJ Lucas. The label initially gained notoriety through their unique YouTube videos and sound, notable members included Gods Wisdom and Morimoto. Handy formed Club Casualties in 2013 alongside Nick Atkinson (aka Ghost), who had previously been a member of Dark World. In 2014, Handy began working as a dishwasher at Amherst College, and used his free time to record and publish his music, primarily through GarageBand under the name "LUCY".

The duo released "392 - 2509:Walk This Way" in 2015, which became their first joint single and only music video as Club Casualties until the release of "Hits the Wall" in 2023.

=== 2020s ===
In 2022, Cooper Handy collaborated with Whitearmor on the single "Even the Score". By 2023, Handy opened for King Krule's Space Heavy tour. His performance in Atlanta, Georgia went viral on TikTok due to his polarizing experimental sound. Handy also performed with rapper RXKNephew, and was reached out for potential collaborations by Clairo and Charli XCX.

The following year, Cooper Handy collaborated with Evilgiane and Surf Gang, on the album JACK & THE BEANSTALK released on June 26, 2024. Handy later collaborated with Boy Harsher under the project "Safe Mind" releasing the track "6' Pole" on September 4, 2024.

In 2026, Handy released the single "Courtside", followed by the release of his 12th studio album CITIZEN'S ARREST released on October 9.

== Discography ==
=== Albums ===
Title	Album details
Best Of	Released: July 25, 2014; Label: Dark World; Format: Digital download, streaming
Cooper B. Handy's Album Vol. I	Released: March 1, 2015; Label: Self-released; Format: Digital download, streaming
Cooper B. Handy's Album Vol. II	Released: June 1, 2016; Label: Self-released; Format: Digital download, streaming
Cooper B. Handy's Album Vol. III	Released: December 3, 2016; Label: Self-released; Format: Digital download, streaming
Cooper B. Handy's Album Vol. IV	Released: July 17, 2017; Label: Self-released; Format: Digital download, streaming
Cooper B. Handy's Album Vol. 5	Released: September 10, 2018; Label: Self-released; Format: Digital download, streaming
Cooper B. Handy's Album Vol. 6	Released: March 19, 2019; Label: Self-released; Format: Digital download, streaming
Cooper B. Handy's Album Vol. 7	Released: October 30, 2020; Label: Self-released; Format: Digital download, streaming
Cooper B. Handy's Album Vol. 8	Released: February 26, 2021; Label: Self-released; Format: Digital download, streaming
The Music Industry Is Poisonous	Released: May 7, 2021; Label: Dots Per Inch; Format: Digital download, streaming
Cooper B. Handy's Album Vol. 9	Released: December 6, 2024; Label: Self-released; Format: Digital download, streaming
CITIZEN'S ARREST	Released: October 9, 2026; Label: Self-released; Format: Digital download, streaming

=== Collaborative albums ===
Title	Album details
Dark World Presents: DJ Lucy	Released: April 7, 2015; Collaborators: DJ Lucas; Label: Dark World; Format: Digital download, streaming
On Thin Ice	Released: December 21, 2016; Collaborators: Gods Wisdom; Label: Self-released; Format: Digital download, streaming
Club Casualties	Released: February 11, 2018; Collaborators: Nick Atkinson; Label: Self-released; Format: Digital download, streaming
Laugh Now Cry L8r	Released: September 18, 2020; Collaborators: Lily Konigsberg; Label: Self-released; Format: Digital download, streaming
February Motel	Released: October 28, 2022; Collaborators: Gods Wisdom; Label: Self-released; Format: Digital download, streaming
Bridge Underwater	Released: September 15, 2023; Collaborators: Nick Atkinson; Label: Self-released; Format: Digital download, streaming
100% Prod I.V.	Released: January 28, 2024; Collaborators: I.V.; Label: Self-released; Format: Digital download, streaming
JACK & THE BEANSTALK	Released: June 26, 2024; Collaborators: Surf Gang; Label: Surf Gang Records; Format: Digital download, streaming
Cutting the Stone	Released: September 4, 2024; Collaborators: Boy Harsher; Label: Nude Club; Format: Digital download, streaming

=== EPs ===
Title	Album details
The Penis Game	Released: July 13, 2013; Label: Self-released; Format: Digital download, streaming
14	Released: January 3, 2014; Label: Self-released; Format: Digital download, streaming
BeautySchoolLateRegistration	Released: February 15, 2016; Label: Self-released; Format: Digital download, streaming
Solitare	Released: August 16, 2017; Label: Self-released; Format: Digital download, streaming
Devoted	Released: May 20, 2022; Label: Dots Per Inch; Format: Digital download, streaming

=== Singles ===
Title	Single details
FRIDAY	Released: September 2023; Label: Self-released; Format: Digital download, streaming
SAME THING	Released: 2024; Label: Self-released; Format: Digital download, streaming
WHAT SHES HAVING	Released: 2024; Label: Self-released; Format: Digital download, streaming
After I Graduate Hogwarts I'm Moving to Stars Hollow	Released: May 30, 2025; Label: Self-released; Format: Digital download, streaming
Even the Score	Released: November 18, 2022; Collaborators: Whitearmor; Label: Self-released; Format: Digital download, streaming

=== Compilations ===
Title	Compilation details
Best of Lucy, Vol. II: 2015–2017	Released: August 10, 2018; Label: Self-released; Format: Digital download, streaming
