= Babyxsosa =

American rapper (born 2000)

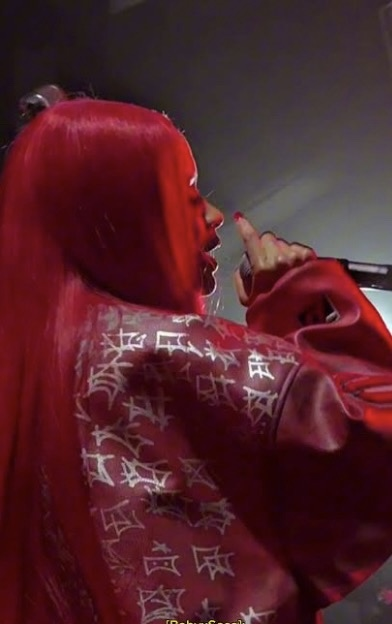
- Babyxsosa performing at Elsewhere in 2026

Background information
- Born: Jasía Makayla Abrams; June 27, 2000 (age 26); Richmond, Virginia, U.S.
- Genres: Trap; underground hip hop; electropop
- Occupations: Rapper; singer; songwriter; producer
- Instrument: Vocals
- Years active: 2017–present
- Formerly of: Surf Gang
- Website: babyxsosa.com

Jasía Makayla Abrams (born June 27, 2000), known professionally as Babyxsosa, is an American rapper and singer. Her 2019 breakout song "Everywhereigo" went viral on TikTok. In 2023, she released the synth-punk extended play (EP) Bling Bling and a self-titled electropop EP. Her underground, lo-fi trap songs have been noted for her high-pitched rapping voice.

== Early life ==
Jasía Makayla Abrams was born and raised in Richmond, Virginia. Abrams participated in competitive all-star cheerleading and gymnastics from age 5 to 17, which served as her first experience with major public performances; She began writing songs while in elementary school and learned to read music after playing the oboe in middle school. After being injured while cheering, she became interested in visual arts and SoundCloud music. She started producing music and DJing in her room. She planned to go to university for graphic design and as an animation intern in New York City, but did not get accepted leading to her focusing on music.

== Career ==
Abrams began her career developing a cult following as a multi-disciplinary self-produced artist in the SoundCloud underground.

In 2019, Abrams joined the New York-based hip-hop collective and record label Surf Gang. She collaborated on early underground singles with producers such as Evilgiane, releasing tracks including "Uberxl" before departing the group to focus on her solo career.

In February 2019, she released her breakout single "Everywhereigo," which became her breakout track after going viral on TikTok during the COVID-19 pandemic.

Following her breakout success, she released several prominent underground singles that further established her presence in the plugg music scene. These included the 2020 track "Who You Love," produced by Evilgiane, as well as her 2021 releases "Keyshia Keef" and "Drama Baby / Malibu," the latter of which became one of her most-streamed tracks, gaining millions of plays across streaming platforms.

As a model, Abrams appeared in MCM Worldwide's #MCMEverywhereIGo campaign alongside Frankie Jonas in April 2021, which was soundtracked by her song "Everywhereigo".

In 2022, Abrams received a prominent mainstream co-sign when rapper Playboi Carti shouted her out on his collaborative track "Sights" with A$AP Rocky, delivering the line, "I just told Sosa that she is the boss."

In January 2023, Abrams appeared in a fashion campaign for a collaboration between Marni and Carhartt WIP alongside funk musician Bootsy Collins and his family, which was shot at their home in Cincinnati. Later that year, she released the techno-drenched extended play (EP) Bling Bling in July 2023, followed by her self-titled electro-chamber pop EP, Babyxsosa, in November 2023.

Abrams later noted in 2024 that she has served as a creative director for Carti. In late 2024, Abrams released "Chanel," which gained mainstream attention in December 2025 when Cardi B featured the track on her Instagram while sporting a custom Chanel outfit at a football game.

In early 2026, Abrams collaborated with North West on a series of unreleased tracks, including "Do It All For Sosa," which featured a sample of Chief Keef's "Love Sosa." Acting as a creative bridge to the underground music industry, Abrams facilitated the connection between West and rapper Skaiwater, which led to West co-producing the track "Blink Twice" on Skaiwater's album wonderful.

Her growing streaming catalog translated to high live-performance demand, leading to prominent headline performances in New York City, including dates at Elsewhere Hall and Market Hotel in early 2026 that sold out within 48 hours of announcement.

== Musical style ==
Babyxsosa's music has been described as raw, lo-fi trap, SoundCloud rap, underground hip hop, and plugg.

Babyxsosa has been noted for her significant influence within the underground hip-hop and plugg music scenes, characterized by her distinct, addictive vocal style and melodic flows. Outlets have credited her as a foundational bridge connecting major mainstream figures to underground music spaces.

Her EP Bling Bling experimented with synth-pop, synth-punk, and industrial techno, while her self-titled EP was chamber pop and electropop. Her voice has been described as high-pitched. Grammy.com's Yousef Srour called her voice "dainty" and "autotuned" and her music "lush", also writing that her "simple lyrics" were about "feelings of desire and despair".

== Discography ==
=== Studio albums ===
List of studio albums, with selected details
Title	Details
Babyonce	Released: 19 October, 2024; Label: Self-released; Formats: Digital download, streaming
BB	Released: November 6, 2026; Label: Self-released; Formats: Digital download, streaming

=== Extended plays ===
List of extended plays, with selected details
Title	Details
Babyxobama	Released: April 20, 2020; Label: Self-released; Formats: Digital download, streaming
Bling Bling	Released: July 2, 2023; Label: Self-released; Formats: Digital download, streaming
Babyxsosa	Released: November 11, 2023; Label: Self-released; Formats: Digital download, streaming

=== Singles ===
List of singles as lead artist, showing year released and album name
Title	Year	Album
"Beat My Ass"	2018	Non-album singles
"Everywhereigo"	2019	Non-album singles
"Emergency"	2019	Non-album singles
"Enemies"	2019	Non-album singles
"Uberxl" (featuring Poloperks)	2019	Non-album singles
"Hectic"	2020	Non-album singles
"Babyxsosa Freestyle 2019"	2020	Non-album singles
"Throw It"	2020	Non-album singles
"Keyshia Keef"	2020	Non-album singles
"WYA/Difference Between"	2020	Non-album singles
"Lonely Nights in NY"	2020	Non-album singles
"Better Days"	2020	Non-album singles
"Who You Love"	2020	Non-album singles
"Don't Even Know"	2020	Non-album singles
"Babyxsosa Freestyle 2019 Fast"	2020	Non-album singles
"Packman"	2021	Non-album singles
"Over"	2021	Non-album singles
"Get Off My Swag"	2021	Non-album singles
"New Fashion"	2021	Non-album singles
"Better By Yourself"	2021	Non-album singles
"Don't Listen"	2021	Non-album singles
"Running"	2021	Non-album singles
"Freak Hoe"	2021	Non-album singles
"Cancer Baby"	2021	Non-album singles
"Drama Baby/Malibu"	2021	Non-album singles
"Money Bags in the Trunk"	2021	Non-album singles
"Delusional"	2021	Non-album singles
"Range Rover"	2022	Non-album singles
"Facetime/Texting"	2022	Non-album singles
"Like Woah"	2022	Non-album singles
"Angel"	2022	Non-album singles
"Girlfriend"	2023	Non-album singles
"Interlude"	2023	Non-album singles
"I Am Bitch"	2023	Non-album singles
"Southside to South Pasadena"	2023	Non-album singles
"Babyonce"	2023	Non-album singles
"Party"	2023	Non-album singles
"No Beyonce"	2023	Non-album singles
"Where You Went Wrong"	2024	Non-album singles
"Jasia"	2024	Non-album singles
"Shutting It Down"	2024	Non-album singles
"Like That"	2024	Non-album singles
"Ny To La"	2024	Non-album singles
"Trendsetter"	2024	Non-album singles
"Sos"	2024	Non-album singles
"My Side"	2024	Non-album singles
"Mia Bae"	2024	Non-album singles
"Baby Soldier"	2024	Non-album singles
"Be My Baby"	2024	Non-album singles
"Check 4 Me"	2024	Non-album singles
"New Rent"	2024	Non-album singles
"Crazy Girls"	2024	Non-album singles
"Chanel"	2024	Non-album singles
"LEATHER GIRL / RICH B****"	2025	Non-album singles
"Chrome Me Out"	2025	Non-album singles
"M$"	2025	Non-album singles
"Like This"	2025	Non-album singles
