= God's Wisdom (disambiguation) =

God's Wisdom may refer to Sophia (wisdom), an idea or personification of wisdom.

God's Wisdom or Gods Wisdom may also refer to:

- Gods Wisdom, a musician
- The Cross (Barre, Massachusetts), a geoglyph that includes trees spelling the text "God's Wisdom"
- God's Wisdom for Navigating Life, a book by Tim Keller (pastor)

== See also ==
- Holy Wisdom, a concept in Christian theology
- Book of Wisdom
- List of knowledge deities which includes gods and goddesses of wisdom
