= Patchmade =

2022 song by Xaviersobased

Song by Xaviersobased

from the album Install
- Released: July 20, 2022
- Recorded: 2022
- Genre: Jerk
- Length: 1:52
- Label: Self-released
- Songwriter: Xaviersobased
- Producer: Kashpaint

Music video
- "Patchmade" on YouTube

"Patchmade" is a jerk song by American rapper Xaviersobased from his mixtape Install released on July 20, 2022. The song was produced by Kashpaint and has been credited with popularizing the jerk microgenre in the 2020s.

== Composition ==
"Patchmade" has been described by Pitchfork as a "jerk-infused" song. The song's instrumental was made by Californian producer kashpaint. British magazine The Face credited him as one of the pioneers of the jerk microgenre.

== Critical reception ==
"Patchmade" was featured on Pitchfork's list of "the Best Rap Stars, Scenes, Trends, Freestyles, and Mixtapes of 2022". Writer Alphonse Pierre stated, "Amid all the buffering sounds, Xavier raps head-turners like, 'Shot a nigga in the nuts, hell yeah castrate' and 'I can't fuck with niggas if they right-wing.' Hitting on all of the important things!".

Music journalist Kieran Press-Reynolds, writing for British magazine The Face, noted the track as a "jerk anthem". Rolling Stone noted "Patchmade" as being a popular TikTok sound, describing it as a "passing headrush".

== Influence ==
According to the publication Passion of the Weiss, "Patchmade" helped popularize the jerk microgenre in the 2020s and was influential to artists such as YT, Fakemink, Phreshboyswag, Subiibabii and Nettspend, who "pointed to this seminal track as the spark for the nu-jerk wildfire". The publication stated, "Kashpaint's contributions were spread amongst kids with nonsensical rap names and near inaudible mixing that never turned into anyone of note".

American rapper Yhapojj would release a single titled "Patchmade" in reference to the song on October 18, 2024.
