= Like a Ribbon =

Studio album by John Glacier
- Released: February 14, 2025
- Length: 30:13
- Label: Young
- Producers: Andrew Aged; Kwes Darko; Evilgiane; Flume; Harrison; Zack Sekoff

John Glacier chronology
Shiloh: Lost for Words (2021)	Like a Ribbon (2025)

Like a Ribbon is the debut studio album by British rapper John Glacier. It was released through Young on 14 February 2025, and was met with positive critical reception.

== Background and release ==
John Glacier released the song "Ocean Steppin'" as a single on 15 January 2025. She released Like a Ribbon through Young on 14 February 2025.

== Composition ==
Like a Ribbon was executive produced by Kwes Darko. The album contains two guest appearances: musician Eartheater on the track "Money Shows", and singer Sampha on the track "Ocean Steppin'". The album's structure has been described as split into three parts, representing the different ways a ribbon moves as it unfurls.

== Critical reception ==
Professional ratings
Aggregate scores
Source	Rating
Metacritic	87/100
Review scores
Source	Rating
Clash	9/10
DIY	4/5 stars
The Guardian	5/5 stars
MusicOMH	4.5/5 stars
Pitchfork	8.2/10
PopMatters	7/10

According to the review aggregator Metacritic, Like a Ribbon received "universal acclaim" based on a weighted average score of 87 out of 100 from 8 critic scores. The album's content was described by reviewers as personal and reflective; in particular, critics described her lyrics as discussing topics related to her personal and professional growth. Nature, and its contrasts with urban life or the digital world, was also identified by some critics as a recurring theme. The album's lyrics were described as presented in a fragmentary style, which critics compared to "scattered voice memos" or "faintly sketched daydreams". Glacier's vocal style on Like a Ribbon was widely noted for its muted character, with several critics describing her delivery as "diaristic", "deadpan", and "stream-of-consciousness". Cameron Lipp of PopMatters also remarked on the recording of Glacier's vocals, describing them as having a "DIY homemade sound".

Critics identified diverse influences on the instrumentation of Like a Ribbon. Hip-hop, and related genres like grime and UK drill, were described as major genres present on the album; electronic genres, including garage and drum 'n' bass, were also highlighted. Shaad D'Souza of Pitchfork characterised Like a Ribbon as incorporating post-punk as well. The diversity in sounds on the album divided some critics: Alexis Petridis of The Guardian felt that the album being "so packed with ideas" made it rewarding to listen repeatedly and explore thoroughly, whereas Lipp commented that it led some of Glacier's ideas to be "half-baked".

The sound of Like a Ribbon was compared by some reviewers to artists such as Dean Blunt and King Krule. The guest appearances were praised for being distinctive without "steal[ing] the spotlight".

== Track listing ==
All lyrics are written by John Glacier; "Ocean Steppin'" lyrics written with Sampha Sisay.

No.	Title	Music	Producer(s)	Length
1.	"Satellites"	Kwes Darko	Darko	1:58
2.	"Don't Cover Me"	Andrew Aged; Zack Sekoff	Aged; Sekoff	3:00
3.	"Money Shows" (featuring Eartheater)	Darko; Rada McNally-Marchenkov	Darko	2:11
4.	"Emotions"	Darko; McNally-Marchenkov	Darko	3:24
5.	"Nevasure"	Harley Streten	Flume	3:16
6.	"Steady as I Am"	Darko	Darko	2:14
7.	"Found"	Darko; Mark Brady; Darren Mew	Darko	2:43
8.	"Home"	Darko; Aged	Darko; Aged	3:22
9.	"Ocean Steppin'" (with Sampha)	Darko	Darko	2:50
10.	"Dancing in the Rain"	Giane Chenheu; Harrison Sutherland	Harrison; Evilgiane	2:11
11.	"Heavens Sent"	Darko; Aged	Darko; Aged	3:00
Total length:				30:13

== Personnel ==
Credits adapted from Tidal. https://tidal.com/album/413347631/credits

- John Glacier – vocals
- Kwes Darko – mixing, engineering (tracks 1–4, 6–11); programming (1, 4, 6–9), drums (1, 4, 6), sampler (7), bass guitar (8), piano (9)
- Flume – mixing (track 5)
- Katie Tavini – mastering
- Andrew Aged – programming (track 2), guitar (8)
- Zack Sekoff – programming (track 2)
- Rada McNally-Marchenkov – vocals (tracks 3, 4)
- Alexandra Drewchin – vocals (track 3)
- Sampha – piano, programming, vocals (track 9)
- Harrison – programming (track 10)
- Evilgiane – programming (track 10)

== Charts ==
Chart performance for Like a Ribbon
Chart (2025)	Peak position
UK Album Downloads (Official Charts)	65
UK Independent Albums (Official Charts)	43
UK R&B Albums (Official Charts)	24
