= Jackzebra =

jackzebra
- Also known as: jackapplepeople, Zeb, 孙龙潭, Jack斑马
- Born: Zhang Zhengkai; 2002 (age 23–24); Shanghai, China
- Genres: Cloud rap; plugg; trap
- Occupations: Rapper; singer; record producer; songwriter
- Years active: 2018–present
- Label: Surf Gang Records
- Member of: SURF GANG, shanghai_shanghai_music

Chinese name
- Traditional Chinese: 張正凱
- Simplified Chinese: 张正凯
Transcriptions
Standard Mandarin
- Hanyu Pinyin: Zhāng Zhèngkǎi
other Mandarin
- Sichuanese Pinyin: Zang^{1} Zen^{1}kai^{3}
Wu
- Wugniu: Tsan^{1} Tson^{1}khae^{5}

Zhang Zhengkai (born 2002), known professionally as jackzebra (stylized in lowercase), is a Chinese rapper, singer and record producer based in Chengdu, Sichuan. His discography spans genres such as cloud rap, plugg, and trap music. He is a member of the American music collective and netlabel SURF GANG.

== Early life ==
Zhang was born in Xujing, Shanghai, in 2002. Growing up, his favorite musicians included Imagine Dragons, Coldplay and M.I.A. He began making songs in 2018, after setting up his own bedroom studio, initially freestyling in English. Zhang later caught the attention of Chinese cloud rap pioneer, Bloodz Boi, who supported his musical direction, and encouraged him to focus on rapping in his native language, Chinese. He recorded his first Chinese song in 2021.

== Career ==
Jackzebra is a part of the Chinese underground rap scene, alongside other contemporaries like Billionhappy, 1kpbs, and Chalky Wong. On April 25 2025, Jackzebra performed his first show in the United States at University of California Los Angeles, facilitated by the student music organization DAW at UCLA in the Sigma Pi Fraternity house. This west coast debut Jackzebra gave established his role into the western underground music scene giving him more traction. He released the mixtape "王中王" (King of Kings) on October 29, 2024, which was rated a 7.8 by Pitchfork, and gained wider prominence online. The Fader described jackzebra's style as "[...] zealously Auto-Tuned slurring interlaced with atmospheric soundscapes that further distort lyrical meaning," further stating that his work had gone viral on social media platforms like Reddit and Chinese microblogging site Weibo. In late 2024, Zhang went viral online being labelled "Chinese Bladee".

On June 13, 2025, Jackzebra released the single "Givenchy," produced by evilgiane, elipropperr, and fleadiamonds, followed by a performance of the track on the popular online radio show On The Radar. He would also sign to internet rap collective and netlabel SURF GANG.

Additionally, Dazed described Jackzebra as "perhaps the only artist ever to enjoy simultaneous virality on both sides of the Chinese firewall," as well as "the voice of post-industrial China".

In December 2025, he released Hunched Jack Mixtape. Pitchfork rated it a 7.4 out of 10 stating, "On his first release for Surf Gang, the Chengdu plugg rapper embraces his outsider persona atop the strongest, most cohesive production of his career".

On March 20, 2026, Jackzebra and Bloodz Boi teamed up to release their collaborative album, titled Bloodzebra. Pitchfork rated the album a 7.9, with reviewer James Gui describing the album as "where slurred Mandarin intersects with stuttering synths, the Chengdu rapper and his mentor interrogate the disconnect between social life and our internal worlds."

== Discography ==
=== Albums ===
| Title | Album details |
|---|---|
| 孙 | Released: May 29, 2022; Label: Self-released; Format: Digital download, streaming |
| Apple | Released: September 18, 2023; Label: Self-released; Format: Digital download, streaming |
| 拾 | Released: September 13, 2024; Label: Self-released; Format: Digital download, streaming |
| Bloodzebra | Released: March 20, 2026; Label: Self-released; Format: Digital download, streaming |

=== Mixtapes ===
| Title | Album details |
|---|---|
| Hotel Exclusive Mixtape | Released: December 8, 2019; Label: Self-released; Format: Digital download, streaming |
| Good Wife Good Life Mixtape | Released: April 21, 2020; Label: Self-released; Format: Digital download, streaming |
| 6 Winter L | Released: January 6, 2021; Label: Self-released; Format: Digital download, streaming |
| 626 Two Year Anniversary Tape | Released: July 9, 2021; Label: Self-released; Format: Digital download, streaming |
| 我和你的水晶之恋 | Released: December 19, 2021; Label: Self-released; Format: Digital download, streaming |
| Jack1888 Mixtape | Released: January 1, 2023; Label: Self-released; Format: Digital download, streaming |
| JackPrblmTape | Released: 6 April, 2023; Label: Self-released; Format: Digital download, streaming |
| Young Powerful Run Mixtape | Released: March 13, 2024; Label: Self-released; Format: Digital download, streaming |
| 王中王 | Released: October 29, 2024; Label: Self-released; Format: Digital download, streaming |
| Above & Beyond | Released: February 14, 2025; Label: Self-released; Format: Digital download, streaming |
| Hunched Jack Mixtape | Released: October 3, 2025; Label: Surf Gang; Format: Digital download, streaming |
| Zhuang Zhuang Mixtape | Released October 2, 2026; Label: Surf Gang; Format: Digital download, streaming |
