= Precious Renee Tucker =

American pianist (born 1998 or 1999)

- Born: 1998 or 1999 (age 27–28); Arkansas, US
- Genres: Classical; free jazz; lo-fi; witch house
- Occupations: Pianist; model
- Instruments: Piano

Precious Renee Tucker (born 1998 or 1999) is an American experimental pianist. She gained recognition after a video of her playing four pianos at the same time went viral. She made her debut at Coachella in 2026 as a guest with British singer PinkPantheress, and has modeled for fashion labels such as Chimi, Prada, and Telfar.

== Life and career ==
Precious Renee Tucker was born in Arkansas, in 1998 or 1999. She has two older siblings. She grew up listening to classical music in church, and took piano lessons from an early age. She also played the clarinet in school band, and the cello in orchestra. Tucker initially gained recognition when a video of her playing four pianos at the same time went viral on platforms such as Instagram and TikTok.

In late 2025, Tucker performed at a brand event for the fashion label Telfar, the first live performance ever held by the brand. In April 2026, she was featured as a model for the fashion label Chimi, in a campaign titled "The Trial". She performed as a guest with British singer PinkPantheress at Coachella 2026. She appeared at Prada's annual Hotel Chelsea event in June, in an outfit inspired by the solar system. Also in June, The Fader listed her as one of the "32 coolest artists of 2026". In August, Tucker became a "destination insider" for Airbnb in a campaign dubbed "Have U Considered", aimed at increasing interest in the towns Hot Springs, Arkansas, Bemidji, Minnesota, and Gibsonton, Florida. Other celebrities featured in the campaign include Xaviersobased and Zack Fox.

Tucker teaches piano to students over the age of 18 in a class called "Piano Anatomy", which has been hosted at Telfar stores in New York City.

== Artistry ==
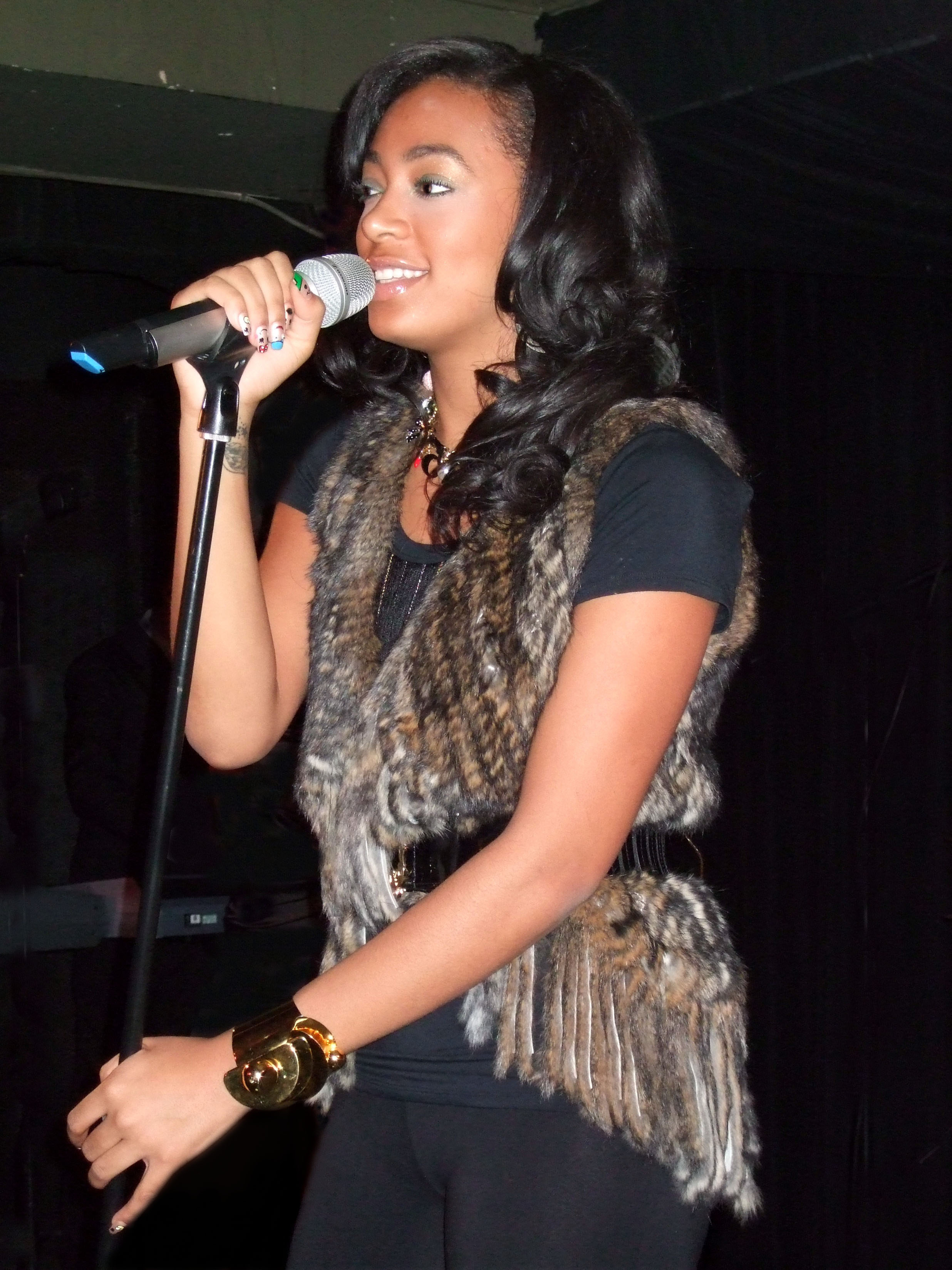
Tucker has named American singer Solange (pictured) as one of her influences.

Tucker has expressed admiration for artists such as Sun Ra, Trippie Redd, and Playboi Carti. She has labeled her music as witch house, and has been described as free jazz and lo-fi. She has named gospel, EDM, metal, and American singer Solange as her influences.

Tucker's work often consists of covers, including "Earth's Creation" by Stevie Wonder and Frédéric Chopin's Waltz Op. 64 No. 2. Her music is primarily released through live performances and social media, rather than streaming platforms or singles.
