= Lil Tony =

American rapper and producer (born c.2004)

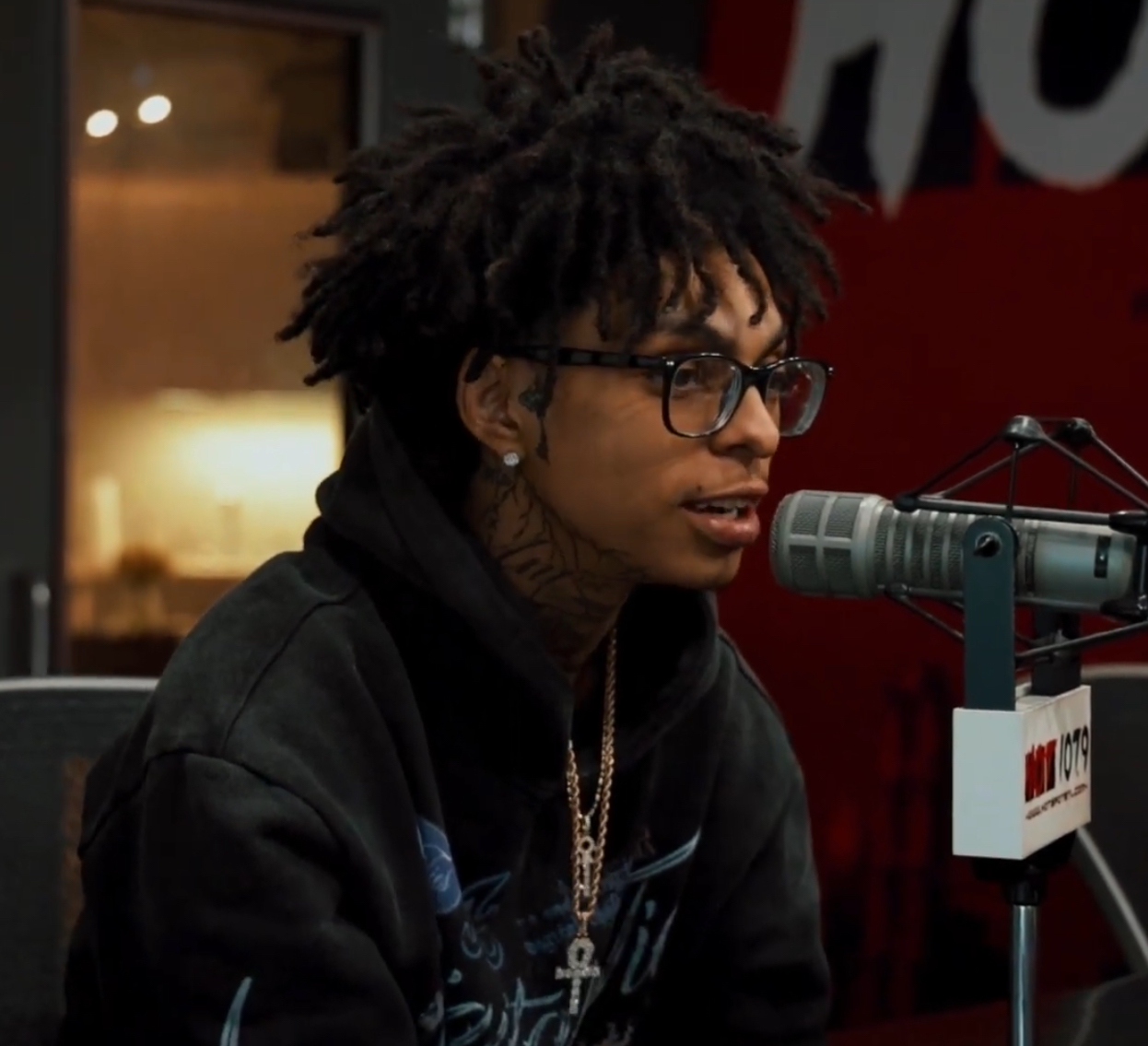
- Lil Tony in 2023

Background information
- Also known as: TKey
- Born: Tekai Elijah Key c. 2004 (age 21–22); Atlanta, Georgia, US
- Genres: Hip-hop; drill
- Occupations: Rapper, record producer
- Instrument: Vocals
- Years active: 2020-present
- Label: Priority
- Website: liltonyagain.com

Tekai Elijah Key (born c. 2004), professionally known as Lil Tony, Lil Tony Official, or TKEY, is an American rapper and record producer from Atlanta.

== Career ==
Key began rapping during the COVID-19 lockdowns after encouragement from a friend. He recorded the songs on his phone.

In 2023, Key would sign to Priority Records. In July, he released the song "3AM". In October, he released "Canoozled". In November, he released the mixtape 2 Sides 2 Every Story.

In April 2024, Key collaborated with Yhapojj on the song "SSwerve Geeked" off the album P.S. Fuck You. A month later, in May 2024, after a shooting at an Atlanta nightclub, rumors spread that Lil Tony was killed in it. Lil Tony ended the rumors, saying: "stop it".

In 2023, Key stated to Rolling Out that he intended to make more positively-messaged music and grow closer to Christianity. His album 14 Steps To Success exemplified this, with each song describing a method to make money. In 2025, he released the Christian hip-hop album Born Again, which received a deluxe in April, that features 1900Rugrat and Nino Paid, among others; it was ranked the sixth best hip-hop album of 2025 by Billboard. He followed it with the singles "Let's Get Into It" on June 5 and "Answer My Prayers" on June 27. In September, he was arrested and charged with gun possession.

== Discography ==
==== Mixtapes ====
- Scopio Szn (2020)
- No Opposition (2021)
- Lil Tony's Life Story (Deluxe) (2021)
- R.I.M.G (2021)
- Neva Be Da Same (2021)
- R.I.M.G (Deluxe) (2021)
- Death Before Dishonor (2021)
- Playas Live 4eva (8lettas) (2022)
- Playas Live 4eva (Deluxe) (2022)
- Tkey (2023)
- 2 Sides 2 Every Story (2023)
- Lil Tony Archive: Vol. 1 (2024)
- Lil Tony Archive: Vol. 2 (2024)
- Lil Tony Archive: Vol. 3 (2024)
- Taken For Ransom (2024)
- Born Again (2025)
- Tkey vs. Tony (2025)
- Discernment (2025)
- Mrs. Key (2025)
- Repent (2026)
- Mrs.Key (Deluxe) (2026)
- Valentines Heartbreak.. (2026)
- Pink Lemonade (2026)
- Elijah (2026)
- Swagster ! (2026)

==== Collaborative mixtapes ====
- Troc (with Hariroc) (2023)
- Swaggbaggs (with Hariroc) (2023)

==== Extended plays ====
- They Cloned T Key (2026)
