= Gods Wisdom =

Massachusetts rapper

- Also known as: Ruvi Ender Arnold
- Born: Reuven Ender-Arnold; 1994 (age 31–32); Northampton, Massachusetts
- Genre: Experimental hip-hop
- Occupations: Musician; rapper; visual artist; record producer
- Years active: 2011–present
- Member of: The Manic Pixies, SRL

Reuven Ender-Arnold (born 1994), known professionally as Gods Wisdom, is an American musician, singer-songwriter and producer based in Massachusetts.

== Early life ==
Reuven Ender-Arnold was born in 1994 in Northampton, Massachusetts.

== Career ==
Arnold was a drummer for a metal band. Around that time, his friend Lucas Kendall who began the "punk label" Dark World, began to shift his sound towards rap music. The pair began recording rap-influenced music as DJ Lucas and Gods Wisdom respectively, with Lucas producing a lot of Arnold's early material. On November 10, 2015, Arnold and Lucas released the collaborative album Gods Lucas, which was accompanied by a music video for the opening track "Unprepared".

In 2016, Pitchfork reviewed his fourth studio album Self Restraint. The album was described as "an artifact from 2011 or 2012" and compared to witch house. Arnold collaborated with Cooper B. Handy on the EP On Thin Ice, which was made on GarageBand and self-described by the pair as "Elliott Smith meets dub". On the song "Beep, Beep", Dark World co-founder Sen Morimoto performs on saxophone.

Arnold later stopped associating with the Dark World label and collective.

In 2019, Arnold was featured on the song "Toolbox" by rapper Sematary on the album Rainbow Bridge.

In 2022, Arnold collaborated with Cooper B. Handy once more on their debut collaborative album February Motel. The album featured production credits by Encii, rapper Hi-C and Surf Gang founder Evilgiane.

== Legacy ==
In 2015, Kim Gordon of Sonic Youth featured Gods Wisdom on a Top-10 list of 2015 for the December issue of Artforum stating, "This white kid rapping and rolling around naked under a big fluffy comforter in the music video for 'Christian Dior' is one of the most disturbing things I've ever seen. I think it's the future, beyond white versus black pop girl squads! I will always think of the male gaze. Thank you, Julia Kristeva." That same year, rapper Despot referred to Gods Wisdom as "the best rapper now".

In 2016, Rihanna was photographed wearing a pink shirt with a Gods Wisdom patch sewn on it. The collaboration occurred due to an LA designer that DJ Lucas had collaborated with on merchandise.

New York magazine The Fader stated "God's Wisdom has a preternatural capacity for making genuinely weird music. Intentionally or not, everything he touches with his deep, detuned voice or his perpetually spacey production is immediately riddled with leering, uncanny overtones." Arnold has been referred to by music journalist Samuel Hyland as "post-SALEM, pre-Sematary".

== Discography ==
=== Albums ===
Title	Album details
Let Him In	Released: 2011; Label: Self-released; Format: Digital download, streaming
Snow	Released: 2013; Label: Self-released; Format: Digital download, streaming
Goth	Released: 2014; Label: Self-released; Format: Digital download, streaming
Self Restraint	Released: 2016; Label: Self-released; Format: Digital download, streaming
February Motel	Released: 2022; Collaborators: Lucy & Gods Wisdom; Label: Self-released; Format: Digital download, streaming
Hell (Unreleased 2016/20)	Released: 2025; Label: Self-released; Format: Digital download, streaming

=== Mixtapes ===
Title	Mixtape details
Gods Lucas	Released: 2015; Collaborators: DJ Lucas and Gods Wisdom; Label: Self-released; Format: Digital download, streaming
gods wisdom + mastercard2k	Released: 2021; Collaborators: Gods Wisdom & Mastercard2K; Label: Self-released; Format: Digital download, streaming

=== EPs ===
Title	EP details
RIP Whitney Houston	Released: 2012; Label: Self-released; Format: Digital download, streaming
Soldier	Released: 2012; Label: Self-released; Format: Digital download, streaming
Insane Angel	Released: 2012; Label: Self-released; Format: Digital download, streaming
Pink Mountains	Released: 2012; Label: Self-released; Format: Digital download, streaming
Vuarnet	Released: 2013; Label: Self-released; Format: Digital download, streaming
Color	Released: 2013; Collaborators: Korenyu & Gods Wisdom; Label: Self-released; Format: Digital download, streaming
I Want to Know	Released: 2013; Label: Self-released; Format: Digital download, streaming
In the USA	Released: 2014; Label: Self-released; Format: Digital download, streaming
4 Song EP	Released: 2015; Label: Self-released; Format: Digital download, streaming
I Only Trust Myself	Released: 2016; Label: Self-released; Format: Digital download, streaming
On Thin Ice	Released: 2016; Collaborators: Gods Wisdom & Lucy; Label: Self-released; Format: Digital download, streaming
Finessin' & Geekin'	Released: 2019; Label: Self-released; Format: Digital download, streaming
The Leak	Released: 2019; Label: Self-released; Format: Digital download, streaming
Slaughter the Sheep	Released: 2019; Label: Self-released; Format: Digital download, streaming
Lethal Poison for the System	Released: 2019; Label: Self-released; Format: Digital download, streaming
facetime satan ep	Released: 2020; Collaborators: Gods Wisdom & Mastercard2K; Label: Self-released; Format: Digital download, streaming
No More Pain	Released: 2022; Label: Self-released; Format: Digital download, streaming
Jesus Sucks	Released: 2022; Label: Self-released; Format: Digital download, streaming
The Mystery	Released: 2023; Collaborators: Mal Devisa & Gods Wisdom; Label: Self-released; Format: Digital download, streaming
Royal Trucks of Melting Ice	Released: 2024; Collaborators: Gods Wisdom & Lucy; Label: Self-released; Format: Digital download, streaming
After I Graduate Hogwarts I'm Moving to Stars Hollow	Released: 2025; Collaborators: Gods Wisdom & Lucy; Label: Self-released; Format: Digital download, streaming
Heated Floors	Released: 2025; Collaborators: Gods Wisdom & Mal Devisa; Label: Self-released; Format: Digital download, streaming

=== Singles ===
Title	Single details
Somatic Integrity	Released: 2012; Label: Self-released; Format: Digital download, streaming
R.I.P	Released: 2013; Label: Self-released; Format: Digital download, streaming
Live to God	Released: 2013; Label: Self-released; Format: Digital download, streaming
Creme Brûlée	Released: 2013; Label: Self-released; Format: Digital download, streaming
If I Woke Up	Released: 2014; Label: Self-released; Format: Digital download, streaming
I Want to Know	Released: 2014; Label: Self-released; Format: Digital download, streaming
2 Lives	Released: 2015; Label: Self-released; Format: Digital download, streaming
playertoo	Released: 2019; Label: Self-released; Format: Digital download, streaming
Watch Me Drown	Released: 2019; Label: Self-released; Format: Digital download, streaming
Toolbox	Released: 2019; Collaborators: Sematary, Ghost Mountain & Gods Wisdom; Label: Self-released; Format: Digital download, streaming
Ruvi's Blues / Angels in Heaven	Released: 2019; Collaborators: Gods Wisdom & Lucy; Label: Self-released; Format: Digital download, streaming
No Sleep (Blueish)	Released: 2022; Label: Self-released; Format: Digital download, streaming
Everyone Is Gone	Released: 2022; Label: Self-released; Format: Digital download, streaming
Life to Live	Released: 2022; Collaborators: Lucy / Gods Wisdom; Label: Self-released; Format: Digital download, streaming
Love Song	Released: 2022; Label: Self-released; Format: Digital download, streaming
Electric Cars	Released: 2023; Collaborators: Gods Wisdom + Lucy (Cooper B. Handy); Label: Self-released; Format: Digital download, streaming
Made by God	Released: 2024; Label: Self-released; Format: Digital download, streaming
Tarchomińska 6	Released: 2024; Label: Self-released; Format: Digital download, streaming
Inside The Piano	Released: 2024; Label: Self-released; Format: Digital download, streaming
