= 40 (Evilgiane, Nettspend and Xaviersobased song) =

2024 single by Evilgiane, Nettspend and Xaviersobased

Single by Evilgiane, Nettspend and Xaviersobased

from the album Heavensgate Vol. 1
- Released: January 11, 2024
- Recorded: 2024
- Genre: Jerk
- Length: 1:04
- Label: Surf Gang Records
- Songwriters: Giane Chenheu; Gunner Sheppardson; Xavier Lopez
- Producer: Evilgiane

Evilgiane singles chronology
"BASIC" (2024)	"40" (2024)	"BEN DAWAVE" (2025)

Music video
- "40" on YouTube

DJ Ess remix cover

"40" is a song by American artists Evilgiane, Nettspend, and Xaviersobased, released under Surf Gang Records on January 11, 2024. The track was the lead single to Evilgiane's album #Heavensgate Vol. 1. "40" was deemed one of the best songs of 2024 by HotNewHipHop, Pitchfork and The New York Times.

A DJ-Ess remix for "40" was released on March 15, 2024.

== Background ==
American rappers Nettspend and Xaviersobased first met in 2023 and later released their collaborative single "OTW" shortly after. The duo would connect with the New York-based producer Evilgiane and Portland, Oregon-based producer Cranes to release their second track together, titled "Idgaf". The track's fruition first came when Xaviersobased's older brother gifted him a beat from Evilgiane. The process behind "40", according to Xaviersobased, was that he was "fried," but "I just remember I was recording, and my manager walked in and said Nettspend was there... That's gang. I'm already knowing him through one of my best mans, [so] working with him is great."

== Composition ==
"40" comes in at a runtime of one minute and four seconds, and is a trap and jerk song which contains "glossy kick drums". According to Chris DeVille of Stereogum, the track sees Evilgiane feature his "latest skittering, booming production", while Nettspend and Xaviersobased "criss cross" through the beat with their "BabyTron-esque dispassionate YouTube-rapper zone". Vivian Medithi of The Fader wrote how "40" sees Xaviersobased performing most of the track before Nettspend delivers a brief mid-verse appearance. The song has been described as reflecting a stylistic connection between different eras of SoundCloud rap, with Xaviersobased noting that "the vibe stayed the same, but musically, the music is just way more fried, way more bass, way faster."

Alli Dempsey of Alternative Press wrote how the track saw Evilgiane "stir up an effervescent, lurching beat while new-gens Nettspend and Xaviersobased lay down breezy, back-and-forth bars." Brady Brickner-Wood of Pitchfork praised the track, writing that it feels like a "sucker punch to the head"; he also wrote about how Evilgiane's "squiggly synths, blown-out 808, and digi-drill drums, Nettspend and Xaviersobased deliver aggressively nonchalant flows and trade bars about toting TECs and skipping school." He ended the review by adding that the track sees the duo unapologetically remain themselves.

== Critical reception ==
The reception for "40" was fairly positive. HotNewHipHop rated "40" at #47 on their "Top 50 Hottest Hip-Hop Songs of 2024". The New York Times' Jon Caramanica ranked it at #12 on his top 30 list for 2024, writing that "a reminder that the only thing more thrilling than one mischievous edge-pusher working without a net is two, or three." Pitchfork called it a "must listen" song, with them featuring "40" on their "Pitchfork Selects Playlist".

== Remix ==
A DJ-Ess remix for "40" was released on March 15, 2024.

== Release history ==
Release dates and formats
Region	Date	Format(s)	Label	Version	Ref.
Various	January 11, 2024	Digital download; streaming	Surf Gang	Original	
Various	March 15, 2024	Digital download; streaming	Surf Gang	DJ Ess Remix	
