= Keep It Goin Xav =

2024 mixtape by Xaviersobased

Mixtape by Xaviersobased
- Released: January 15, 2024
- Genre: New York hip-hop
- Length: 27:53
- Label: Self-released
- Producers: 1o; CJ808; DJ Ess; Endren; Karakuli; Ksuuvi; Kuru; Matarii; Mateus; Nyli; OK; Rek; Ss3bby; Xaviersobased; Zoot

Xaviersobased chronology
The MostHated SoBased Tape (2023)	Keep It Goin Xav (2024)	With 2 (2024)

Singles from Keep It Goin Xav
- 1. "On My Own" Released: January 8, 2024

Keep It Goin Xav is the fifth solo mixtape by the American rapper Xaviersobased. Hosted by DJ Renessy, it was self-released on January 15, 2024, on SoundCloud before its release to other streaming services on January 21. Several producers including Xaviersobased himself produced the mixtape and features guest appearances from Jtxpo, Kuru, Yhapojj, and Nettspend.

A New York hip-hop mixtape, Keep It Goin Xav draws influences from Atlanta trap, Chicago drill, and jerk, blending the digital sound of Internet rap with Xaviersobased's Upper Manhattan roots. The song "On My Own" released as a single from the mixtape. Keep It Goin Xav was considered one of the best albums of 2024 by Pitchfork and The Fader, with the former also naming it the best rap album of the year.

== Background, release, and promotion ==
In 2023, the American rapper Xaviersobased created jerk-influenced and Lil B-inspired music that made him a standout in the post-hyperpop and digicore scenes, later evolving from a SoundCloud artist in the "post-jerk" scene to a key figure in underground rap.

"On My Own", the only single from his mixtape Keep It Goin Xav, was released on SoundCloud on January 8, 2024. The single was followed by the release of the rest of the mixtape on SoundCloud on January 15, before its release to other streaming services on January 21.

== Composition ==
=== Overview ===
Keep It Goin Xav is a New York hip-hop mixtape that pulls from musical scenes such as Atlanta trap, Chicago drill, and jerk. Characterized by flowing instrumentals and smooth vocals, it blends the digital sound of Internet rap with Xaviersobased's Upper Manhattan roots. Interview clips with the mixtape's host, DJ Rennessy, are placed throughout the mixtape. In between songs, Xaviersobased and DJ Rennessy are heard discussing genre, their future influence, and their love for the world. Alphonse Pierre of Pitchfork described the mixtape as a "look-at-how-far-I've-come project", calling the music "vibrant, improvisatory, and fun as hell". Production was handled by several producers including Xaviersobased himself, and the mixtape contains guest appearances from Jtxpo, Kuru, Yhapojj, and Nettspend.

=== Songs ===
Keep It Goin Xav's opening track is "FanOut", a chopped and screwed song with a sped-up second half. Jordan Darville of The Fader compared its instrumental to Drake's 2011 album Take Care. The following "Need Me" showcases Xaviersobased's ability to adapt various subgenres of rap music; it ends with a snippet of him describing his music as dance and pop with aggressive bass. The lyrics in "Get High" discuss getting drunk and high. "BreakItDown" is followed by "Google", a glitch and bop track where Pierre thought Xaviersobased sounded "overly stoned". "Ascend" featuring Jtpxo is followed by "Special"; Pierre wrote that you could imagine the line "Fuck the rap game I think they tryna' ban me" as being rapped by French Montana. Darville highlighted the track's "convulsing drum patterns" and Atlanta trap sound. "MyAll" features Kuru, and is followed by "UToldMeIWasAFuckUpGirl", which features Yhapojj. The latter showcases subtle and rhythmic Auto-Tune crooning; Pierre compared the track to the melodies of the American rapper and singer Duwap Kaine. "KlkMiHijo" begins with an intro of DJ Rennessy giving a nod to the women of Dyckman Street followed by Xaviersobased's slurred and Max B-inspired melody. Pierre said the track's Atlanta trap beat could be seen on a mixtape by the American rapper Gucci Mane. "Load Up" is followed by "On My Own", a track which put a "dreamy twist" on a distorted Milwaukee low-end instrumental. Pierre likened the loud clipping and distortion of "This Far" to a jet engine; Darville said Nettspend's appearance on the track sounds like the American rapper and singer Lil Tracy. Xaviersobased uses an older Chief Keef flow on the penultimate track "KeepItGoin"; over its stuttering beat, he mentions relaxing and wearing a Goth Money Records T-shirt. The final track is "Finna Go Ot"; Pierre stated that Xaviersobased casually delivered the line "White bitch yeah she playin' with my hair" during the otherwise chaotic track.

== Critical reception ==
Professional ratings
Review scores
Source	Rating
Pitchfork	8.2/10

Keep It Goin Xav received positive reviews upon its release. It was awarded the "Best New Music" accolade from Pitchfork; Pierre called it a "bottle-popping celebration", writing: "Not often is music this off the walls also this grounded". However, he criticized DJ Rennessy's lack of "the identifiable charisma of memorable mixtape hosts" and the mixtape's slower moments. HotNewHipHop listed Keep It Goin Xav as one of the best releases of January 2024; their writer said the mixtape displays Xaviersobased's strong songwriting abilities and that it "keeps you wanting more". Complex's Jon Barlas deemed Keep It Goin Xav a "defining moment" and "a semi-breakthrough" for Xaviersobased; the magazine included "Need Me" in their mid-year list of the best songs of the year.

Pitchfork deemed Keep It Goin Xav the best rap album of the year; Pierre said Xaviersobased "puts it all together" on the mixtape "without losing the off-the-cuff randomness of fucking around on SoundCloud", lauding Xaviersobased for "standing out from the pack of indistinguishable internet rappers". The same publication also listed it the 29th best album of the year; Evan Rytlewski felt that Xaviersobased's take on youth's brevity added extra depth to the music. The Fader considered it the 33rd best album of the year; Darville wrote that Xaviersobased's "aqueous sound is brought to Marianas Trench-level depths" and that the mixtape "proves he can throw a rager in uncharted territory and have it hit just as hard".

== Track listing ==
All lyrics are written by Xavier Lopez.

No.	Title	Producer(s)	Length
1.	"FanOut"	Kuru; Nyli	2:47
2.	"Need Me"	Rek; Xaviersobased	1:39
3.	"Get High"	Ksuuvi	2:05
4.	"BreakItDown"	Matarii; Nyli	1:31
5.	"Google"	1o	1:22
6.	"Ascend" (featuring Jtxpo)	1o	2:25
7.	"Special"	DJ ESS	1:44
8.	"MyAll" (featuring Kuru)	Kuru; Xaviersobased	2:26
9.	"UToldMeIWasAFuckUpGirl" (featuring Yhapojj)	Xaviersobased	1:54
10.	"KlkMiHijo"	CJ808	1:20
11.	"Load Up"	OK; Xaviersobased; Zoot	1:40
12.	"On My Own"	Xaviersobased	1:23
13.	"This Far" (featuring Nettspend)	Ss3bby	2:00
14.	"KeepItGoin"	Mateus	2:07
15.	"Finna Go Ot" (bonus track)	Endren; Karakuli	1:30
Total length:			27:53
