= Snow Strippers =

American electronic music duo

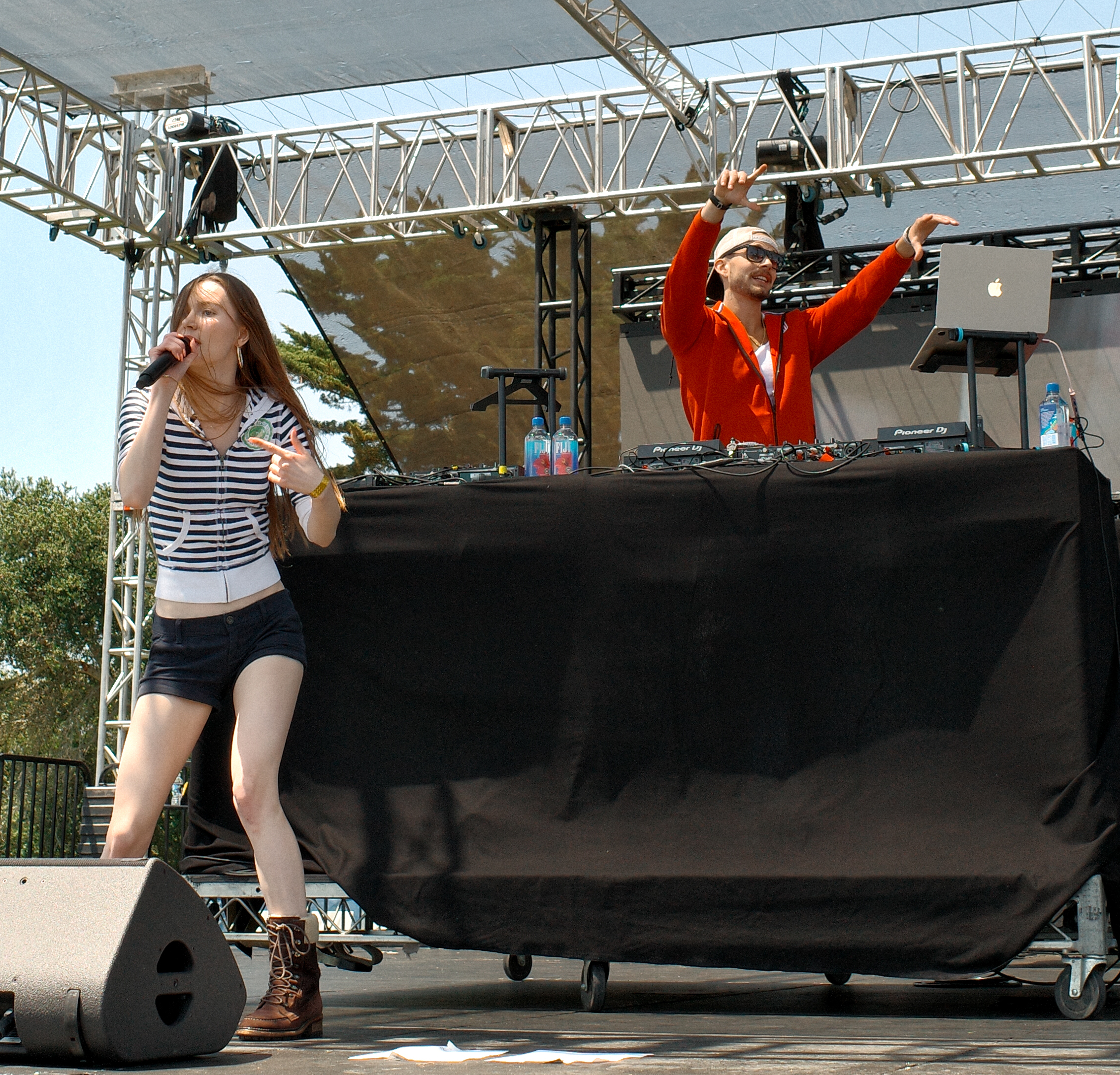
- Snow Strippers performing at Extravaganza in 2025

Background information
- Origin: Detroit, Michigan, U.S.
- Genres: Electronic; EDM; electropop
- Years active: 2021–present
- Labels: SURF GANG; Mad Decent
- Members: Tatiana Schwaninger; Graham Perez
- Website: nicebassbro.com

Snow Strippers are an American electronic music duo formed in Detroit, Michigan in 2021 and consisting of singer Tatiana Schwaninger and record producer Graham Perez. They first gained prominence online as part of the indie sleaze resurgence in 2021 before self-releasing their eponymous debut album in 2022 and the mixtapes April Mixtape 2 and April Mixtape 3 in 2022 and 2023, respectively.

== History ==
Tatiana Jasmine "Tati" Schwaninger was born on February 23, 1996 in Clearwater, Florida, where she was also raised. Graham T. Perez was born on April 15, 1996 in Belleville, Illinois, where he was also raised, and later moved to Dunedin, Florida. Schwaninger met Perez in proximity on the dating app Tinder in 2018. They soon moved to Detroit together from Clearwater before relocating to New York City. The two started making music as Snow Strippers in late 2021, with Schwaninger singing and Perez producing. Before the duo's formation, Schwaninger had not made any music, while Perez was already producing under the name "DeliverTheCrush" and was a part of producer Evilgiane's collective SURF GANG and producer Taylor Morgan's collective Garden Avenue, although he later retired the moniker.

They initially released their music independently, including their 2022 self-titled debut album and their 2022 mixtape April Mixtape 2, before officially signing to Evilgiane's label Surf Gang Records and DJ Diplo's label Mad Decent in 2023. Their first record to be released through the labels was their third mixtape, April Mixtape 3, in May 2023, which was preceded by the singles "Under Your Spell" and "Don't You Feel". They were featured on American rapper Lil Uzi Vert's album Pink Tape in June 2023. They released the extended play Night Killaz Vol. 1 on November 24, 2023, preceded by the single "Just Your Doll". The duo's following album, Night Killaz, Vol. 2, was released May 8, 2024. “Under Your Spell” especially found popularity online during 2024, where the song was used in short-form content of the crime drama TV-series Dexter.

== Musical style ==
Snow Strippers' music has primarily been described as electronic music; they have described it as EDM and it has also been described as electropop. It contains elements of new rave, witch house, electroclash, shoegaze, hyperpop, and techno, and has frequently been compared to the music of Canadian electronic duo Crystal Castles. Clash's Robin Murray compared their "digitised sound with a punk-like rawness to it" to the American electronic band Salem. Pigeons and Planes' Sophie Walker wrote that their music was "trashy and decidedly off like a Harmony Korine film". Matt Weinberger of Paper described the duo's music as having "an electronic, icy eargasm sound", while The Line of Best Fit's Mitch Stevens wrote that their music was "electronic chaos".

== Discography ==
=== Studio albums ===
List of studio albums, with release date and label shown
Title	Details
The Snow Strippers	Released: June 30, 2022; Label: Self-released; Format: CD, digital download, streaming

=== Mixtapes ===
List of mixtapes, with release date and label shown
Title	Details
April Mixtape	Released: April 20, 2022; Label: Self-released; Format: Digital download, streaming
April Mixtape 2	Released: September 15, 2022; Label: Self-released; Format: CD, digital download, streaming
April Mixtape 3	Released: May 5, 2023; Label: Surf Gang, Mad Decent; Format: CD, digital download, streaming

=== Extended plays ===
List of extended plays, with release date and label shown
Title	Details
Night Killaz Vol. 1	Released: November 24, 2023; Label: Surf Gang, Mad Decent; Format: Digital download, streaming
Night Killaz Vol. 2	Released: May 8, 2024; Label: Surf Gang, Mad Decent; Format: Digital download, streaming

=== Singles ===
List of singles as lead artist with title, year, and album
Title	Year	Peak chart positions	Album
Title	Year	US Dance	Album
"Keep Holding On"	2021	—	The Snow Strippers
"Anthems"	2022	—	The Snow Strippers
"Every Night"	2022	—	The Snow Strippers
"Know My Name"	2022	—	The Snow Strippers
"Insane Like Me"	2022	—	The Snow Strippers
"Passionate Highs"	2022	—	The Snow Strippers
"Colliding Walls" / "Killing" / "Fantasy"	2022	—	The Snow Strippers
"I Know What You Are Thinking"	2022	—	The Snow Strippers
"Time Warp Angels"	2022	—	The Snow Strippers
"Tragic Surprise"	2022	—	The Snow Strippers
"Genocide"	2022	—	The Snow Strippers
"Candy"	2023	—	Non-album single
"It's Goin Bad" / "Lacerate"	2023	—	April Mixtape 3
"Under Your Spell" / "Don't You Feel"	2023	5	April Mixtape 3
"Just Your Doll"	2023	—	Night Killaz Vol. 1
"So What If I'm a Freak"	2024	—	Night Killaz Vol. 2

=== Other charted songs ===
Title	Year	Peak chart positions		Album
Title	Year	US Bub.	US R&B/HH	Album
"Fire Alarm" (Lil Uzi Vert featuring Snow Strippers)	2023	1	41	Pink Tape
