= Jerkin' =

Music genre

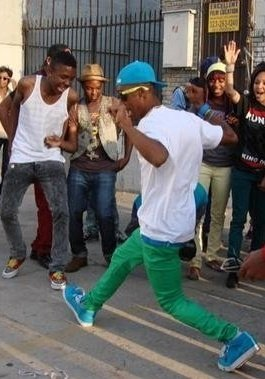
- An image of a jerk dance performance, also referred to as jerkin'.
- Stylistic origins: West Coast hip hop; hyphy
- Cultural origins: Late 2000s; Los Angeles, California
- Typical instruments: Sampler; synthesizer; drums; keyboard; vocals
- Derivative forms: Jerk

Other topics
- Hip hop music; history of hip hop music; timeline of hip hop

Jerkin' or Jerk is a street dance culture and hip hop subgenre originating in urban California in the late 2000s. It gained mainstream popularity outside of California by Inland Empire-based groups New Boyz and Audio Push, and has origins in the Los Angeles metropolitan area. Since breaking into the mainstream in 2009, jerkin' gained fans along the West Coast, East Coast, and in Europe, notably France and Germany, although it was heavily derided in the Southern United States.

During the early 2020s, the original jerk rap scene inspired a microgenre simply known as "jerk", which was spearheaded by New York rapper Xaviersobased alongside his collective 1c34, and Californian producer kashpaint. They reimagined the sound of jerk rap with contemporaneous influences.

== Background ==
According to Oktane of Audio Push, jerkin' culture came from gang members dancing at parties, stating: "Jerking actually came from gang-banging. Like, it was a dance that gang members did. Like, the anti-dance. If you were in the party and everyone was dancing, [the gang members] would be doing the jerk." The dance itself consists of moving your legs in and out called the "jerk", and doing other moves such as the "reject", "dip", and "pindrop".

== Jerk rap ==
The rap group New Boyz pioneered jerk rap through their hit in Los Angeles entitled "You're a Jerk", followed by Audio Push's "Teach Me How to Jerk". As the jerk subculture continued to flourish, several new groups specializing in jerk rap were courted and signed by major labels. Arista Records had signed the group the Rej3ctz, whilst jerk groups Cold Flamez and Pink Dollaz also gained recognition. Once Jerkin' went mainstream, new dance crews and artists began competing and performing at events in Southern California as well as in other parts of the world as its popularity spread. The Ranger$ crew not only competes in dance contests, winning numerous awards, but have recorded several songs and have been signed to a major label. Other notable crews in the Southern California area include Action Figure$, U.C.L.A. Jerk Kings, and the LOL Kid$z.

== Fashion ==
People who jerk usually wear skinny jeans (varying from the unusual to the usual colors and washes), considered a rejection of the baggy pants style. Many elements of scene and the raver are used in the jerkin' movement, such as bright colored clothing, tight pants, or novelty graphic tees. Additionally, people who engage in jerk dances generally wear hightop or retro shoes, including Chuck Taylor and Nike hightop shoes. Shoes may or may not be multi-colored.

== 2020s revival ==
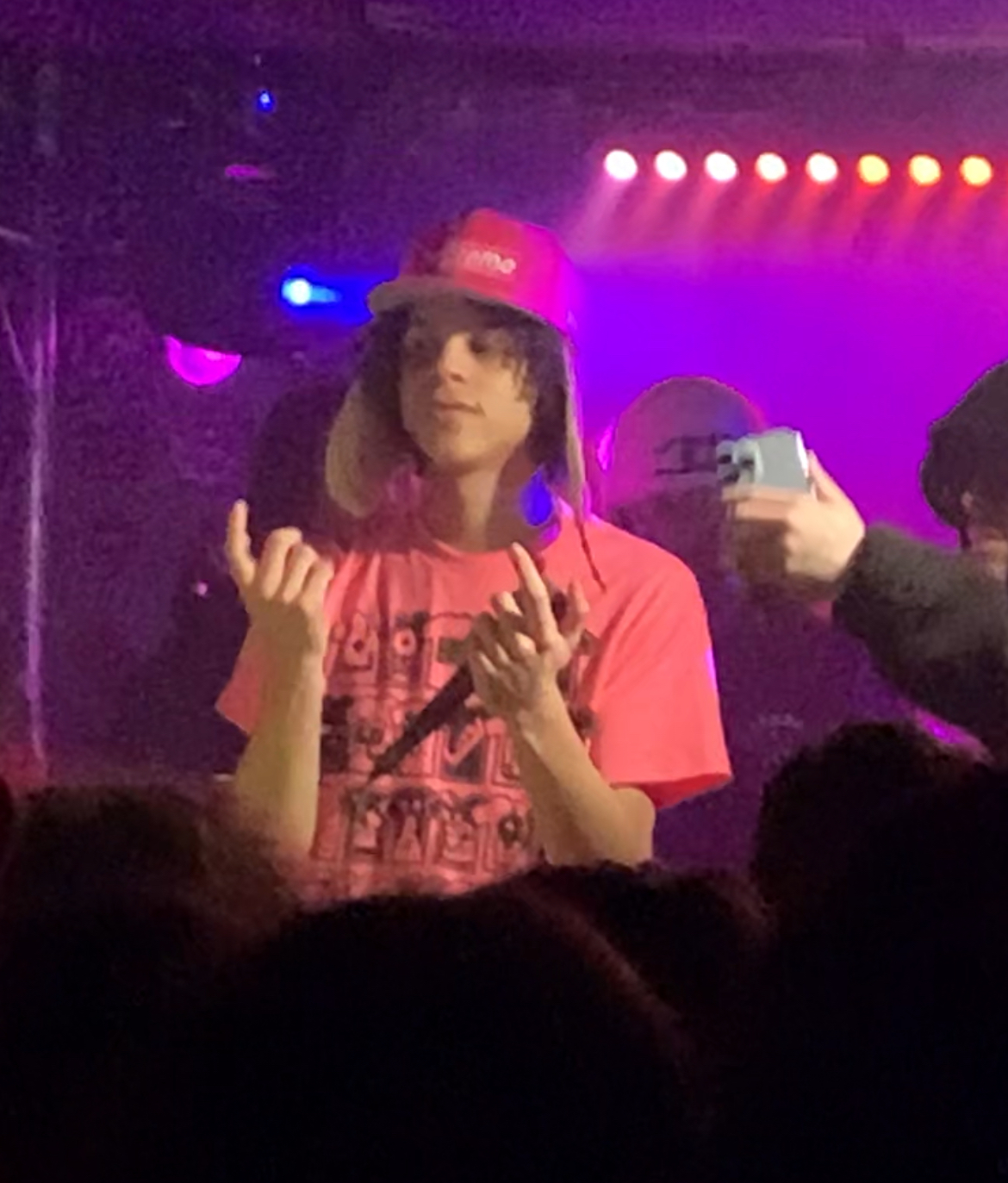
Xaviersobased performing at Baby's All Right in Brooklyn, NY on February 2nd, 2023.

In the early 2020s, a new generation of underground rappers and producers began drawing influence from the original jerk rap sound into a new genre simply known as "jerk". Although, the revival did not reproduce the original style verbatim, instead reimagining it with faster tempos, more melodic synth layers, and abstract, often humorous or off-kilter lyricism.

The sound was initially penned by New York rapper Xaviersobased, alongside his collective 1c34, who are credited with spearheading and popularizing the movement which was then further developed by Californian producer kashpaint and later evolved by incorporating influences from Milwaukee lowend, plugg music and digicore. Xavier's 2022 track "Patchmade", produced by kashpaint is widely regarded as a foundational moment.

Notable acts include Phreshboyswag, Subiibabii, Nettspend and Yhapojj. Notable underground rappers like Duwap Kaine, later took influence from the style, releasing the album DuwapSoBased in 2023. While rooted in the United States, the movement gained further momentum in the UK with artists like YT, Len Lucci, Fimiguerrero, and Fakemink being credited with spearheading a "new UK rap revolution".

== See also ==
- Internet rap
- Microgenre
