= Xaviersobased =

American rapper (born 2003)

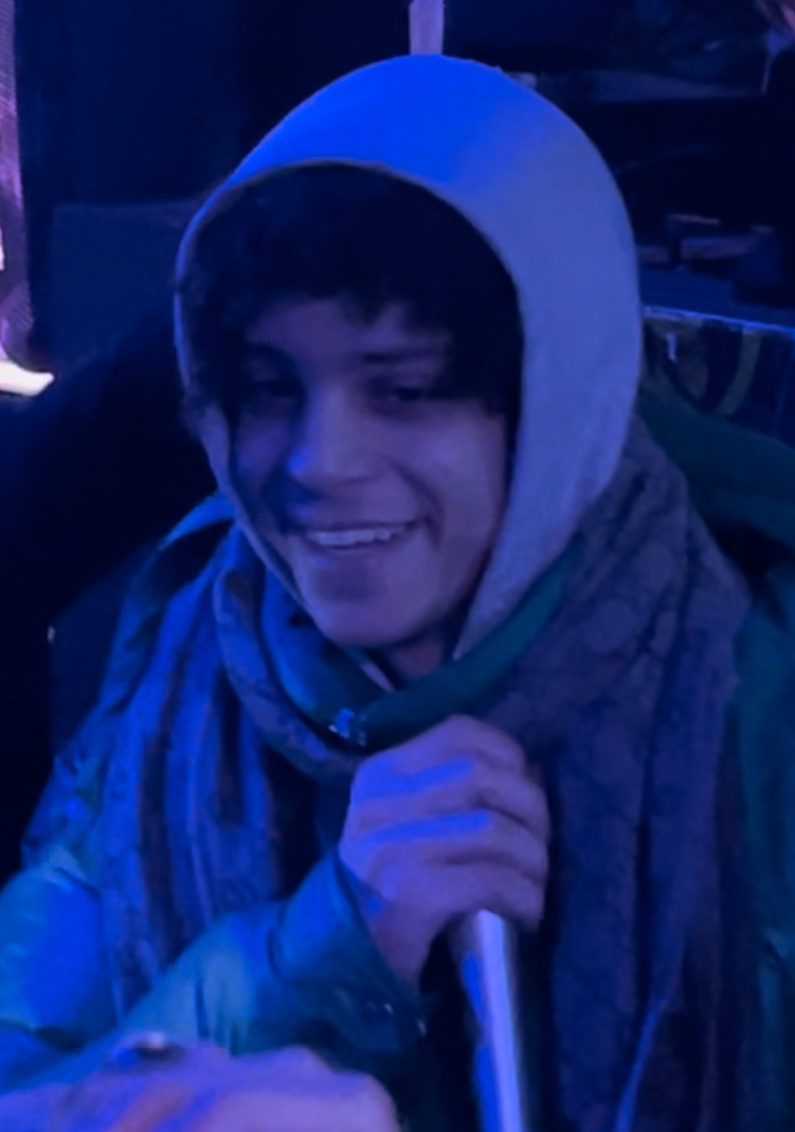
- Xaviersobased in 2023

Background information
- Born: Xavier Lopez; October 23, 2003 (age 23); New York City, U.S.
- Origin: New York City, U.S.
- Genres: Cloud rap; jerk; plugg; trap; digicore (early)
- Occupations: Rapper; singer; record producer; songwriter
- Years active: 2016–present
- Labels: Surf Gang; Atlantic
- Member of: 1c34
- Formerly of: Novagang; So Evil Boyz; Onwrd; #TeamSonic; Jewelxxet; Lore(s); Crisis Club
- Website: 1cland.com

Xavier Lopez (born October 23, 2003), known professionally as Xaviersobased (stylized in lowercase), is an American rapper and record producer. He and his collective group 1c34 pioneered the jerk microgenre.

Lopez began releasing music as Xaviersobased in 2016. In 2022, he gained popularity online with the song "Patchmade", described by British magazine The Face as a "jerk anthem". In 2024, he released the mixtape Keep It Goin Xav. In 2025, he signed to Atlantic Records and released the EP Once More. His self-titled debut album, Xavier, was released on January 30, 2026.

== Early life ==
Lopez was born on October 23, 2003, in New York City, on the Upper West Side of Manhattan. He is of Dominican descent. His mother began working as a DJ in the 1980s. From an early age, Lopez's brother, known professionally as Nurse, introduced him to skateboarding along with artists such as Odd Future and ASAP Rocky. When he was 10 years old, the YouTube algorithm recommended him the music video for Yung Lean's 2013 single "Hurt", leading him to discover artists such as Lil B, Bladee's Drain Gang, and Black Kray's Goth Money Records. Lopez has also cited Chief Keef, Hi-C and Duwap Kaine as early musical inspirations.

== Career ==
=== 2020–2023: Career beginnings ===
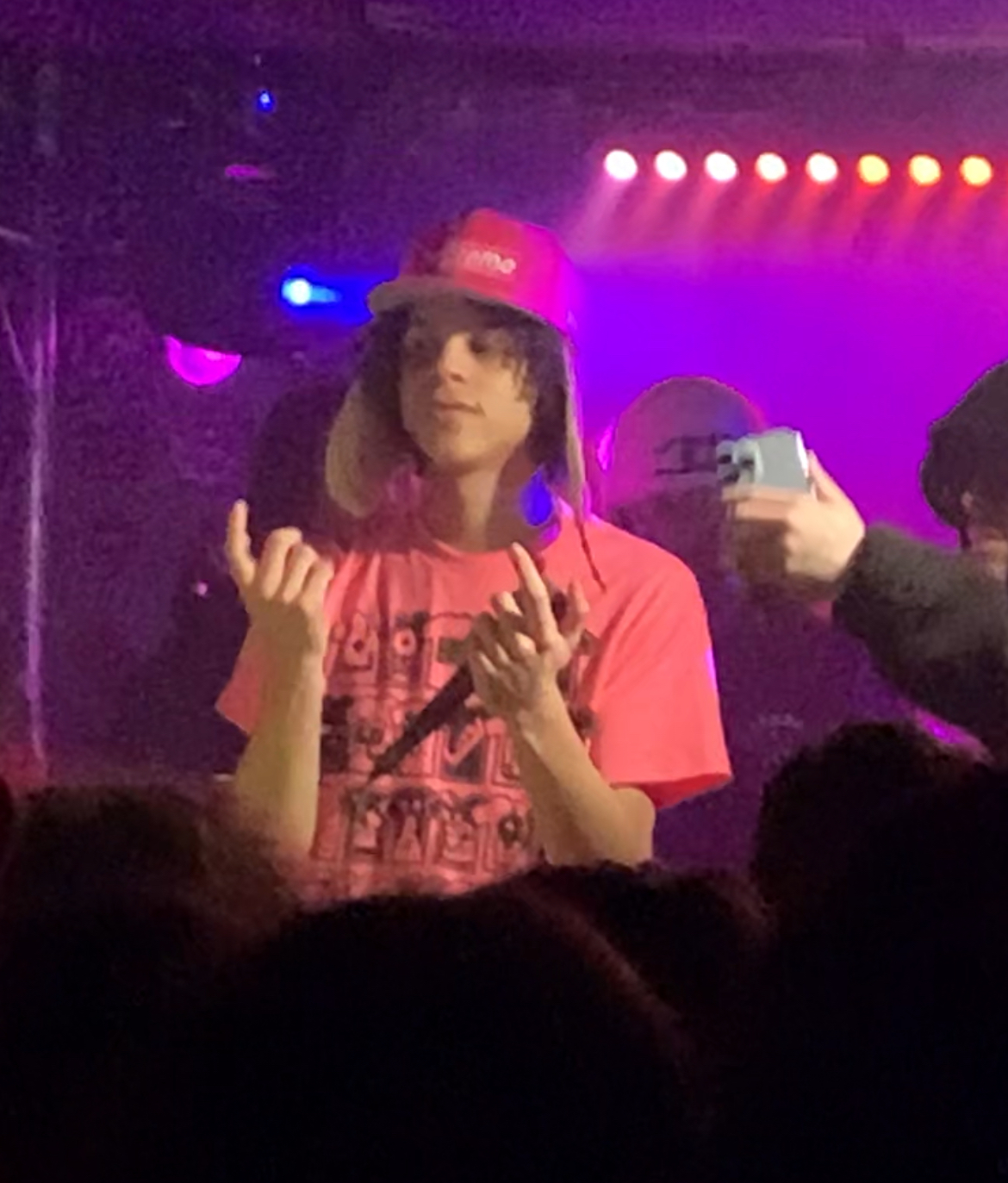
Lopez performing at Baby's All Right in Brooklyn in 2023

Lopez was inspired by American rapper Lil B's "based" rap style, which led to him adopting the moniker Xaviersobased. He later became a member of online rap collectives Novagang and Jewelxxet. In 2020, Lopez traded a gaming headset for a recording microphone as the COVID-19 lockdowns kept him indoors with only internet access. He invited his friends, with whom he was playing Tony Hawk's Underground: Pro, to join a group he formed known as 1c34. According to The Fader, the group began as a "gaming clan" but later became a music group. Lopez and his collective are credited with spearheading and pioneering the 2020s microgenre jerk.

In 2021, Lopez produced the song "Witches and Angels" by rapper St47ic. After several more releases, on July 20, 2022, Lopez released the mixtape Install, which featured the song "Patchmade" produced by Kashpaint. The song garnered traction online and popularize the jerk microgenre. According to Rolling Stone, the song was a popular "TikTok sound" described as a "passing headrush". British magazine The Face labeled the song a "jerk anthem".

Alphonse Pierre of Pitchfork reviewed the song "Classist" from the mixtape, writing: "Don't bother checking to see if there is sound coming from another tab: the feel of two beats playing at once on 'Classist' is intentional". In February 2023, Lopez released the song "How I Feel 2", which Pierre labeled the "must-hear rap song of the day", adding, "the track has all the qualities of Xaviersobased's best SoundCloud music: Songs evolve as they go, lines stand out that could mean everything or nothing".

=== 2024: Keep It Goin Xav and With 2 ===
On January 11, 2024, Lopez released a single titled "40" with Surf Gang producer Evilgiane and fellow rapper Nettspend. This was followed by Lopez appearing as a guest on the popular online radio show On the Radar, in which he performed a freestyle over a DJ Ess instrumental. This freestyle was later released as the track "Special". On January 16, he released a 15-track mixtape called Keep It Goin Xav, hosted by DJ Rennessy. The mixtape featured guest appearances from rappers such as Nettspend, Yhapojj, Jtxpo, and Kuru. In his review of Keep It Goin Xav, Pierre wrote that despite drawing from various influences, Xaviersobased's style retains a strong New York rap identity, distinguishing him in the generally "amorphous" internet rap scene. He described the music as "vibrant, improvisatory, and fun as hell", while being relatively inaccessible with respect to heavily layered and sometimes pitch-shifted vocals. He further praised the selection of faster tracks, while remarking that the slower ones are less interesting, but not devoid of subtlety.

Lopez released his second mixtape of 2024, With 2, on June 5. The album, partially unfinished, was hastily released upon it being completely leaked one week earlier. In a review for Pitchfork, Kieran Press-Reynolds noted that as Lopez's peers tend to dilute their sound to appeal to a broader audience, "it's sweet to watch someone who doesn't give a fuck."

=== 2025–present: Once More and Xavier ===
"Impact", a song by Nettspend featuring Lopez, was released to streaming platforms on March 18, 2025. This was followed by Nettspend's American Invert tour, which was also joined by Xaviersobased. On April 28, Lopez released a collaborative EP titled BasedSlime with rapper OsamaSon, hosted by DJ Rennessy.

Lopez released the EP Once More on August 1, 2025. On October 26, Lopez and Che appeared on stage to perform their song "Mannequin" from Che's album Rest in Bass at Yeat's set during ComplexCon 2025 in Las Vegas. Lopez and Che, along with PlaqueBoyMax, recorded a song together, titled "Motto". In December, he released the single "Walk to Me". He later announced the Riverside tour, which focused on American dates.

On January 15, 2026, he announced Riverside 2.0, which focused on an American and European tour from March to April. On January 30, Lopez released his debut studio album titled Xavier, featuring 20 tracks along with the streaming bonus track "Party At My Place". In an article by The Fader, he was listed as one of the "32 coolest artists" of 2026. Lopez was one of the opening acts for Ken Carson's Xperimenting Tour, consisting of 14 United States concerts from August 26 to September 23, 2026. In August, Lopez became a "destination insider" for Airbnb in a campaign dubbed "Have U Considered", aimed at increasing interest in the towns Hot Springs, Arkansas, Bemidji, Minnesota, and Gibsonton, Florida. Other celebrities featured in the campaign include Precious Renee Tucker and Zack Fox.

== Artistry ==
Joe Houghton of NME described Lopez's style as making use of "playful production" and "eclectic microgenre influences". Houghton called his lyrics "idiosyncratic" and "at once brazen, vulnerable and optimistic". Lopez has stated that he never "played into" TikTok algorithms to find success. He said in a 2026 interview with Teen Vogue that living in New York City has inspired him artistically.

== Personal life ==
Lopez is bisexual and holds left-wing views, and has referenced both in his music. In "Patchmade", he raps, "I can't fuck with niggas if they right-wing". He often speaks on political issues such as the Israeli–Palestinian conflict on social media. Lopez described fame as "at times [...] overwhelming" in an interview with Teen Vogue. He also mentioned that he dropped out of college, while not disclosing what program or institution he went to publicly.

== Discography ==
Studio albums

- Xavier (2026)

Live albums

- Live from Surf Gang x NTS: Miami (2025)

Mixtapes

- With (2021)
- 2,000 (2021)
- Who Are You? (2022)
- Someone Help (2022)
- Nothingnesss (2022)
- Install (2022)
- And When (2022)
- Keep It Goin Xav (2024)
- With 2 (2024)

Collaborative mixtapes

- The MostHated SoBased Tape (with Samosthated) (2023)

Extended plays

- Axajwjn 124643 Jashnbje (2020)
- Marble Blast Ultra (2020)
- Store (2021)
- And (2021)
- With B4 With (2021)
- Reivax (2021)
- New Chapter (2021)
- Kjgtb78r (2021)
- Pretty Songs (2021)
- And 2 (2022)
- Xav on Tour (2022)
- Expensive Coffee Is So Damn Bitter .. (2022)
- Halloween Might Jus Be My Fav Holiday FR (2022)
- Bath & Body Works (2023)
- Rly Hoping Life Goes Well RN (2023)
- And 3 (2023)
- 34th Level (2023)
- Stash Musik tha EP (2023)
- U Ain't Gettin Saved tha EP (2023)
- Once More (2025)
- El Xav Del 34 (2026)

Collaborative EPs

- Casino (with Glost) (2020)
- Twin Peaks EP (with Heroinsick) (2020)
- Nick X Xavier (with Zuro) (2021)
- NYC 2 ATL (with Jtxpo) (2021)
- With 1.5 (with Crunchy) (2021)
- Yhaposobased (with Yhapojj) (2023)
- BasedSlime (with OsamaSon) (2025)
