= BasedSlime =

2025 EP by Xaviersobased and OsamaSon

EP by Xaviersobased and OsamaSon
- Released: April 27, 2025
- Genre: Rage
- Length: 8:10
- Label: Self-released
- Producers: Xaviersobased; OsamaSon; Ok; Zuro; Ss3bby

Singles from Basedslime
- 1. "Lil O Just Popped a Pill"; 2. "Not a Regular Civilian"

BasedSlime (stylized as "#BASEDSLiME") is the first collaborative extended play (EP) by American rappers Xaviersobased and OsamaSon. It was self-released on April 27, 2025, through SoundCloud, and was hosted by the DJ Rennessy. The four-track project includes two previously released songs, "Lil O Just Popped a Pill" and "Not a Regular Civilian", alongside two new songs, "Whole Lotta" and "Shitshow". A music video for "Shitshow" accompanied the release.

== Background and release ==
The Fader described Xaviersobased and OsamaSon as two of the underground's most closely watched figures and noted that they had collaborated on several occasions in the year before the EP. The EP has been described as rage.

BasedSlime was released on April 27, 2025, as the pair's first project made together. It was released exclusively on SoundCloud, and was hosted by DJ Rennessy, a New Jersey-based DJ who has hosted projects for other underground artists. "Lil O Just Popped a Pill" and "Not a Regular Civilian" had been released before the EP.

== Composition ==
"Whole Lotta" was described by The Fader as a "space age take" on classic Atlanta trap. "Shitshow" was produced by Ok, who also produced much of OsamaSon's 2025 album Jump Out; The Fader said the song's distorted electronic production sounds like a track that could have been on that project's deluxe edition.

== Reception ==
In a review for HotNewHipHop, Zachary Horvath wrote that the EP's sound would not appeal to most rap listeners. He found the lyrics sparse and at times difficult to make out, criticized the mixing, and singled out the noisy production of "Shitshow". Horvath compared the project's loud production and DJ shouts to Playboi Carti's album Music (2025), calling it overbearing despite its short length, but still recommended listening to it.

== Track listing ==
BasedSlime track listing
No.	Title	Writer(s)	Producer(s)	Length
1.	"Shitshow"	Xavier Lopez; Amari Middleton; William Dale Minnix II	Ok	3:00
2.	"Lil O Just Popped a Pill"	Lopez; Middleton	Xaviersobased	1:33
3.	"Not a Regular Civilian"	Lopez; Middleton; Nicholas Jones	Xaviersobased; OsamaSon; Zuro	1:13
4.	"Whole Lotta"	Lopez; Middleton; Sebastian Aguilar	Ss3bby	2:24
Total length:				8:10

Notes

- All tracks are stylized in lowercase.
