= Duwap Kaine =

American rapper and singer (born 2002)

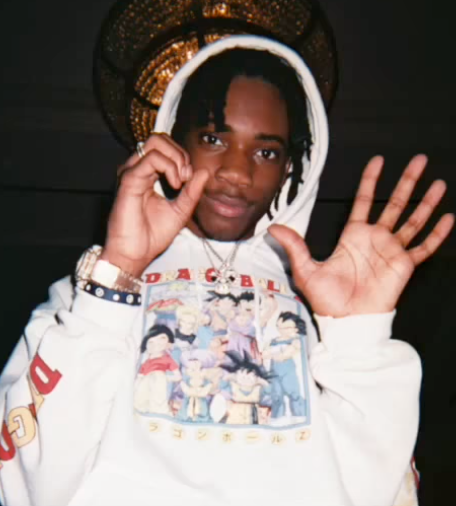
- Duwap Kaine in July 2019

Background information
- Born: Donald George Ruffin; 2001 or 2002 (age 24–25)
- Genres: Hip hop; trap; plugg; SoundCloud rap; R&B
- Occupations: Rapper; songwriter; singer; record producer
- Years active: 2011–present
- Label: TAF

Donald George Ruffin, known professionally as Duwap Kaine, is an American rapper, singer, and songwriter. He is known for his projects Underdog and Bad Kid from the 4, as well as his early collaborations with record producer Pi'erre Bourne.

== Career ==
Ruffin began making chopped and screwed remixes of songs at age 6. He started producing music using Mixcraft. He released "Elmo freestyle", which later became a viral hit, at age 9. As a teenager, he began releasing music under the alias "Dolphin God". He released his debut mixtape Diffrent [sic] in 2013 under the DolphinGod alias.

One of his first singles to gain attention was the song "A Stove Is a Stove", which he released in 2016, with the song since reaching over a million plays. In 2017, he released the Pi'erre Bourne-produced song "Santa". In September 2017, he was co-signed by American rapper Lil Yachty as one of his favorite rappers. Ruffin has worked with artists including Trippie Redd, K$upreme, Lil Wop, and Lil Tracy. He released two mixtapes that year, Friends Till The End & Forever Kaine.

In 2018, he released the notable mixtape Underdog. Most of the tape's instrumentals were made by Duwap's frequent collaborator Nine9. Ruffin released the single "Playin Wit Da Autotune" on August 11, 2021. Ruffin released his album Faith Like Esther on June 26, 2022. In December 2024, he released A Kid From Savannah, a short autobiography. He released his mixtape The Godfather in March 2026.

== Musical style ==
His music is known for its "melodic, autotune-soaked raps". Pigeons and Planes has described him as a "godfather of internet rap". He has cited Chief Keef, Soulja Boy, and Lil B as influences on his music.

== Personal life ==
As of 2026, Ruffin lives in Lawrenceville, Georgia. He was diagnosed with ADHD as a child. He has a daughter.

== Discography ==
=== Studio albums ===
Title	Album details
What a Time to Be Wild	Released: October 9, 2015; Label: Self-released; Format: Digital download, streaming
Bad Kid from the 4	Released: February 21, 2020; Label: Self-released; Format: Digital download, streaming
Underdog 2	Released: June 10, 2020; Label: Self-released; Format: Digital download, streaming
Thank You Kaine	Released: September 1, 2020; Label: Self-released; Format: Digital download, streaming
After the Storm	Released: 2015; Label: Self-released; Format: Digital download, streaming
A Dogg's Influence	Released: March 7, 2022; Label: Self-released; Format: Digital download, streaming
Family Guy	Released: September 16, 2022; Label: Self-released; Format: Digital download, streaming
Duwap So Based	Released: May 21, 2023; Label: Self-released; Format: Digital download, streaming
Darkest Days	Released: July 17, 2023; Label: Self-released; Format: Digital download, streaming
You Influenced Me	Released: August 16, 2023; Label: Self-released; Format: Digital download, streaming
On The Way	Released: September 27, 2023; Label: Self-released; Format: Digital download, streaming
Bully	Released: November 9, 2023; Label: Self-released; Format: Digital download, streaming
Thank You Kaine II	Released: December 3, 2023; Label: Self-released; Format: Digital download, streaming
Goldmine	Released: March 26, 2024; Label: Self-released; Format: Digital download, streaming
Thank You Kaine 3	Released: June 21, 2024; Label: Self-released; Format: Digital download, streaming
Double YL (You Live You Learn)	Released: August 28, 2024; Label: Self-released; Format: Digital download, streaming
I Am Not A Human Being	Released: October 23, 2024; Label: Self-released; Format: Digital download, streaming
Nobody Is Coming To Save You	Released: January 1, 2025; Label: Self-released; Format: Digital download, streaming

=== Deluxe albums ===
Title	Deluxe details
After the Storm (Deluxe Version)	Released: June 17, 2021; Label: Self-released; Format: Digital download, streaming

=== Mixtapes ===
Title	Mixtape details
Trappin Fever	Released: November 29, 2015; Label: Self-released; Format: Digital download, streaming
Trappin Fever 2	Released: December 27, 2015; Label: Self-released; Format: Digital download, streaming
Kaine's Collection	Released: January 26, 2015; Label: Self-released; Format: Digital download, streaming
Fourteen	Released: February 21, 2016; Label: Self-released; Format: Digital download, streaming
Kaine's Mansion 5	Released: April 15, 2016; Label: Self-released; Format: Digital download, streaming
Citgo Stories	Released: May 11, 2016; Label: Self-released; Format: Digital download, streaming
88 Kaine	Released: July 2, 2016; Label: Self-released; Format: Digital download, streaming
Candy Kaine	Released: September 10, 2016; Label: Self-released; Format: Digital download, streaming
Friends Till the End	Released: February 1, 2017; Label: Self-released; Format: Digital download, streaming
Forever Kaine	Released: August 19, 2017; Label: Self-released; Format: Digital download, streaming
Underdog	Released: July 4, 2018; Label: Self-released; Format: Digital download, streaming
Heardhead	Released: October 13, 2021; Label: Self-released; Format: Digital download, streaming
Faith Like Esther	Released: June 26, 2022; Label: Self-released; Format: Digital download, streaming
Kaine's Diary	Released: August 26, 2022; Label: Self-released; Format: Digital download, streaming
Underdog 3	Released: October 25, 2022; Label: Self-released; Format: Digital download, streaming
Warning B4 Destruction	Released: December 16, 2022; Label: Self-released; Format: Digital download, streaming
Remember Who Started the Wave	Released: January 6, 2023; Label: Self-released; Format: Digital download, streaming
Feels Like Summer	Released: June 3, 2023; Label: Self-released; Format: Digital download, streaming
Southside's Most Wanted	Released: May 18, 2024; Label: Self-released; Format: Digital download, streaming
Lost Files, Vol. 1	Released: September 30, 2024; Label: Self-released; Format: Digital download, streaming
Down South Down 2 Earth	Released: November 10, 2024; Label: Self-released; Format: Digital download, streaming

=== Extended plays ===
Title	Extended play details
Mr. 4	Released: November 22, 2019; Label: Self-released; Format: Digital download, streaming
FreeLilEBG	Released: March 3, 2022; Label: Self-released; Format: Digital download, streaming
Mistreated	Released: April 1, 2024; Label: Self-released; Format: Digital download, streaming
Kaine's Laboratory	Released: July 25, 2024; Label: Self-released; Format: Digital download, streaming
