= Yhapojj =

American rapper (born 2003)

- Born: Jamareuan Macaiah Jones; July 9, 2003 (age 23); Huntsville, Alabama, US
- Genres: Hip hop; trap; rage; jerk; cloud rap; plugg
- Occupations: Rapper; songwriter
- Instrument: Vocals
- Labels: Simple Stupid; Geffen

Jamareuan Macaiah Jones (born July 9, 2003), known professionally as Yhapojj (stylized as YhapoJJ), is an American rapper and songwriter.

== Biography ==
Jones was born July 9, 2003, in Huntsville, Alabama. He began his career freestyling during the COVID-19 lockdowns in 2020. The first part of his stage name, "Yhapo," stands for "Young Hearts Ascend Past Orbit", as stated in an interview with Breativity. In November 2023, he released the EP Evolution of Xur. In December 2023, with Xaviersobased and Nettspend, Jones caused a mini-riot at the Mercury Lounge in Manhattan.

In May 2024, he released P.S. Fuck You. The album contained one feature, Lil Tony, on the song "Sswerve Geeked". In November, he released the EP Before T.L.Y. prior to the album No Ceiling in December.

== Artistry and influences ==
Jones cites Michael Jackson's Thriller as an influence. He is also a fan of The Twilight Saga. Other influences include Gladys Knight & the Pips, The Isley Brothers, Lil' O, Z-Ro, UGK, Miley Cyrus, Lil B, OG Maco and Anquette.

Jones' songs depict himself as a fictional wolf named Xur. He uses similar vocal tricks to that of ILoveMakonnen. He also, as described by a HotNewHipHop writer, an "unconventional auto-tuned delivery and off-beat rapping".

== Discography ==
=== Studio albums ===
Title	Album details
Love Thy Enemies	Released: August 10, 2021; Label: Self-released; Format: Digital download, streaming
When Angels Cry	Released: January 28, 2022; Label: Self-released; Format: Digital download, streaming
Gossip Girl	Released: April 11, 2023; Label: Self-released; Format: Digital download, streaming
P.S. Fuck You	Released: May 10, 2024; Label: Self-released; Format: Digital download, streaming

=== Deluxe albums ===
Title	Album details
When Angels Cry (Deluxe)	Released: February 14, 2022; Label: Self-released; Format: Digital download, streaming
P.S. Fuck You Deluxe	Released: June 19, 2024; Label: Self-released; Format: Digital download, streaming

=== Mixtapes ===
Title	Album details
SSETTIWORLD	Released: October 31, 2022; Label: Self-released; Format: Digital download, streaming
Before T.L.Y.	Released: November 20, 2024; Label: Self-released; Format: Digital download, streaming

=== Extended Plays ===
Title	Album details
SlimeStories	Released: February 21, 2020; Label: Self-released; Format: Digital download, streaming
We Love Yhapo!	Released: July 8, 2020; Label: Self-released; Format: Digital download, streaming
Yhap Birthday EP	Released: July 9, 2022; Label: Self-released; Format: Digital download, streaming
Yiix Yhap	Released: November 15, 2022; Label: Self-released; Format: Digital download, streaming
Yiix Yhap DELUXE	Released: December 20, 2022; Label: Self-released; Format: Digital download, streaming
Pluto	Released: July 26, 2023; Label: Self-released; Format: Digital download, streaming
Evolution of Xur	Released: November 15, 2023; Label: Self-released; Format: Digital download, streaming
YhapEndOfYear Classic Remix	Released: November 26, 2023; Label: Self-released; Format: Digital download, streaming
MODE	Released: December 21, 2023; Label: Self-released; Format: Digital download, streaming
Mode Pt.2	Released: December 22, 2023; Label: Self-released; Format: Digital download, streaming
A New Genre	Released: December 29, 2023; Label: Self-released; Format: Digital download, streaming
Happy 21st Birthday Yhap!	Released: July 9, 2024; Label: Self-released; Format: Digital download, streaming
No Ceilings	Released: December 11, 2024; Label: Self-released; Format: Digital download, streaming

=== Collaborative EPs ===
Title	Album details
Yhaposobased with Xaviersobased	Released: February 22, 2023; Label: Self-released; Format: Digital download, streaming
D-Generation X with hhhcra	Released: June 1, 2023; Label: Self-released; Format: Digital download, streaming
D-Generation X2 with hhhcra	Released: January 6, 2024; Label: Self-released; Format: Digital download, streaming

=== Singles ===
Title	Year	Album
"Spazz"	2020	Non-album singles
"Slime Anthem"	2020	Non-album singles
"Hood Muslim"	2020	Non-album singles
"30slimez"	2020	Non-album singles
"Grapeness"	2020	Non-album singles
"Take Him Out" (featuring Izaya Tiji)	2021	Non-album singles
"F My Potna"	2021	Non-album singles
"Hoes Love SSwords"	2021	Non-album singles
"I'm Not Carti"	2021	Non-album singles
"SSisters"	2021	Non-album singles
"When I'm Crying"	2022	Non-album singles
"Ultra Instinct Yhap"	2022	Non-album singles
"SStay Away From Me"	2022	Non-album singles
"Who Killed Kenny?"	2022	Non-album singles
"Tummy Ache"	2022	Non-album singles
"Pray 4 Mehikko"	2022	Non-album singles
"Winningg"	2022	Non-album singles
"KungPow The Trilogy"	2022	Non-album singles
"KamiKaze"	2022	Non-album singles
"Gun Em Down"	2022	Non-album singles
"Neva"	2023	Non-album singles
"One Love"	2023	Non-album singles
"Hurt My Feelings"	2023	Non-album singles
"Free Top SShotta"	2023	Non-album singles
"Hookup"	2023	Non-album singles
"Ily"	2023	Non-album singles
"Bubbles"	2023	Non-album singles
"hope ulike me"	2024	Non-album singles
"Make Sum Noise"	2024	Non-album singles
"SSuperman" (featuring PercShawty)	2024	Non-album singles
"SSwerve Geeked" (with Lil Tony Official)	2024	P.S. Fuck You
"Fly"	2024	P.S. Fuck You
"Flock"	2024	Non-album singles
"Moshpit" (featuring Nino Paid)	2024	Non-album singles
"I'm Da 1ne"	2024	Non-album singles
"Patchmade"	2024	Non-album singles
"Yelda"	2024	Non-album singles
