= Surf Gang =

Hip-hop collective

SURF GANG
- Official logos for Surf Gang

Background information
- Origin: New York City, New York, United States
- Genres: Hip-hop; underground hip-hop; plugg; drill
- Years active: 2018–present
- Members: Air B.; Drewbreesh; Eera; Evilgiane; Harrison; Harto Falión; JDN; Moh Baretta; Pasto Flocco; Skrap; Jackzebra
- Past members: Babyxsosa; Bobainee; Caspr; DeliverTheCrush; Polo Perks; Tommytohotty
- Website: https://surfgang.nyc/

Surf Gang (styled in all caps) is an American hip-hop collective and netlabel founded in New York City in 2018 by Evilgiane. They have been cited as influential to the contemporary underground rap scene. Among the core associates are producers Eera, Harrison, Evilgiane, and vocalists Jackzebra, Pasto Flacco, Moh Baretta, Casper, and Bobainee.

Surf Gang has helped artists like Snow Strippers, Xaviersobased, Nettspend and Harto Falión gain wider recognition and collaborated with artists such as Matt Ox, Kendrick Lamar, Cooper B. Handy, Mike, Earl Sweatshirt, Suzy Sheer, and Jackzebra.

== History ==
Surf Gang originated as a skate crew in New York City in 2017, with its members creating music using the equipment they had and bonding over their shared creative interests at a local skate park, before transitioning into a music collective the following year.

In 2021, the collective released their debut compilation album, titled SGB. The collective followed up with their second release of the year, titled SVG1. In 2022, the collective released At Least We Tried. In 2023, Surf Gang released their debut EP, titled Fast 5 with 454. Following the EP's release, Surf Gang teamed up with Matt Ox to release OXYGen. Shortly after, they teamed up with Serane to release Sgpm. Their third and final release of the year, in collaboration with John Glacier, titled Jgsg, was release din August of that year. In 2024, Surf Gang teamed up with Bbyafricka to release their second EP of their discography, titled Hard Copy. That same year, Surf Gang also released Jack & The Beanstalk with Lucy. Surf Gang then followed up with Church & Surf with Durkalini. In 2025, Surf Gang signed Chinese rapper Jackzebra, following his signing, Surf Gang released Scenic Route with Lerado Khalil, and Amnesia with Jawnino in December. In 2026, Pompeii // Utility with Earl Sweatshirt and MIKE was released. Upon release, the project charted at number 26 on the UK Album Downloads Chart, number 46 on UK Independent Albums chart, number eight on UK R&B Albums chart, and number 34 on Billboard's Independent Albums chart.

== Influences and musical style ==
Surf Gang's works have been cited as influential to the contemporary underground rap scene. The founder of the collective, Evilgiane, has defined the collective's sound as "post-apocalyptic rap."

== Discography ==
=== Albums ===
Title	Album details
SGB	Released: January 14, 2021; Label: Self-released; Format: Digital download, streaming
SGV1	Released: June 30, 2021; Label: Self-released; Format: Digital download, streaming
At Least We Tried	Released: October 31, 2022; Label: Self-released; Format: Digital download, streaming

=== Collaborative albums ===
Title	Album details
OXygen (with Matt Ox)	Released: April 20, 2023; Label: Self-released; Format: Digital download, streaming
SGPM (with Serane)	Released: May 26, 2023; Label: Self-released; Format: Digital download, streaming
JGSG (with John Glacier)	Released: August 25, 2023; Label: Self-released; Format: Digital download, streaming
Jack & The Beanstalk (with LUCY)	Released: June 26, 2024; Label: Self-released; Format: Digital download, streaming
Church & Surf (with Durkalini)	Released: August 15, 2024; Label: Self-released; Format: Digital download, streaming
Scenic Route (with Lerado Khalil)	Released: November 12, 2025; Label: Self-released; Format: Digital download, streaming
Amnesia (with Jawnino)	Released: December 5, 2025; Label: Self-released; Format: Digital download, streaming
Pompeii // Utility (with Earl Sweatshirt and MIKE)	Released: April 3, 2026; Label: Tan Cressida, 10k Global, SURF GANG; Format: Digital download, streaming, LP, CD
Next Day Air. (with Rockitneedspace)	Released: October 2, 2026; Label: Tan Cressida, SURF GANG; Format: Digital download, streaming

=== EPs ===
Title	Album details
Selfish (with Hook)	Released: May 12, 2023; Label: Self-released; Format: Digital download, streaming
Fast 5 (with 454)	Released: July 12, 2023; Label: Self-released; Format: Digital download, streaming
Hard Copy (with Bbyafricka)	Released: July 17, 2024; Label: Self-released; Format: Digital download, streaming
Grey Sky London (with Valee)	Released: December 13, 2024; Label: Self-released; Format: Digital download, streaming
