= Evilgiane =

American record producer and songwriter

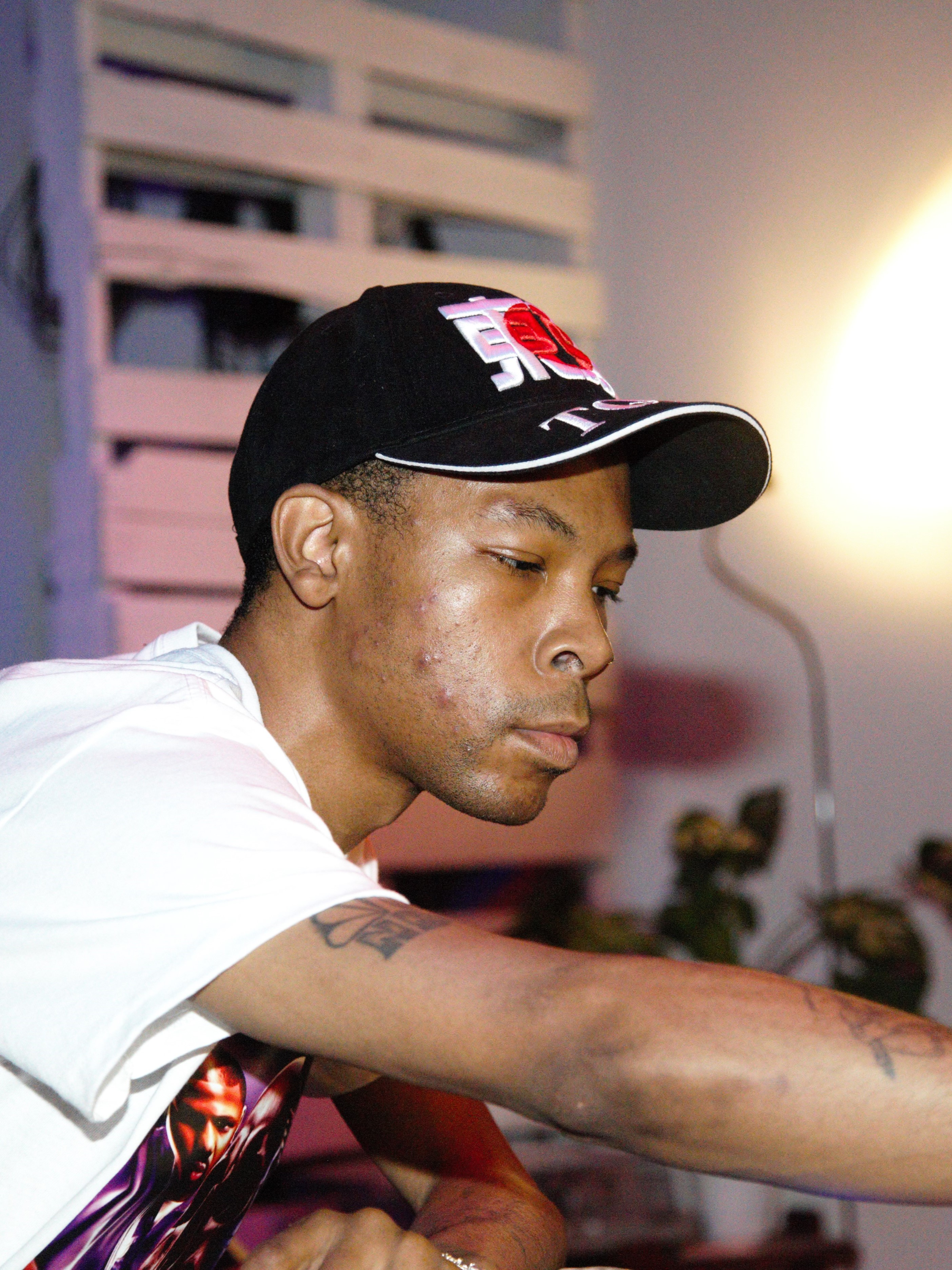
- Evilgiane performing in June 2025

Background information
- Born: Giane Chenheu; February 17, 1997 (age 29); Brooklyn, New York City, U.S.
- Genres: Hip-hop; trap
- Occupations: Record producer; songwriter
- Label: SURF GANG
- Member of: SURF GANG
- Website: surfgang.nyc

Giane Chenheu (born February 17, 1997), professionally known as Evilgiane (stylized in lowercase), is an American record producer and songwriter. He has worked with Kendrick Lamar, Baby Keem, ASAP Rocky, Playboi Carti, Earl Sweatshirt, Mike, and Nettspend, among others.

In 2018, he founded the collective and record label SURF GANG, to whom they signed electronic music duo Snow Strippers and rapper Xaviersobased, among other artists. Evilgiane uses the music production software Ableton to produce.

== Early life ==
Giane Chenheu was born on February 17, 1997 in Brooklyn, New York. He grew up in Chinatown, New York. His father was a producer and his mother was a songwriter. Chenheu began making beats in his early teens, using FL Studio Mobile. Growing up, he listened to music produced by Timbaland and Static Major.

== Career ==
Evilgiane founded New York-based collective and label Surf Gang in 2018. In 2023, he produced the single "The Hillbillies" by Kendrick Lamar and Baby Keem. He produced the Earl Sweatshirt track "Making the Band (Danity Kane)" in collaboration with producer Clams Casino.

In 2024, Evilgiane released his mixtape #HeavensGate Vol. 1. "40", a track from the mixtape which featured Nettspend and Xaviersobased, was listed among the best songs of 2024 by The New York Times and Pitchfork. He released instrumental album Giane 2 in January 2026.

On 10 March 2026, the double-single from the album Pompeii // Utility was released, consisting of Mike's "Minty", produced by Evilgiane and Pentagrvm, and Earl Sweatshirt's "Earth", produced by Harrison.

On June 7, 2026, in an article by Pitchfork, it was announced that Evilgiane's second installation titled #HEAVENSGATE VOL. 2 will be released later in 2026.
