= Earl Sweatshirt discography =

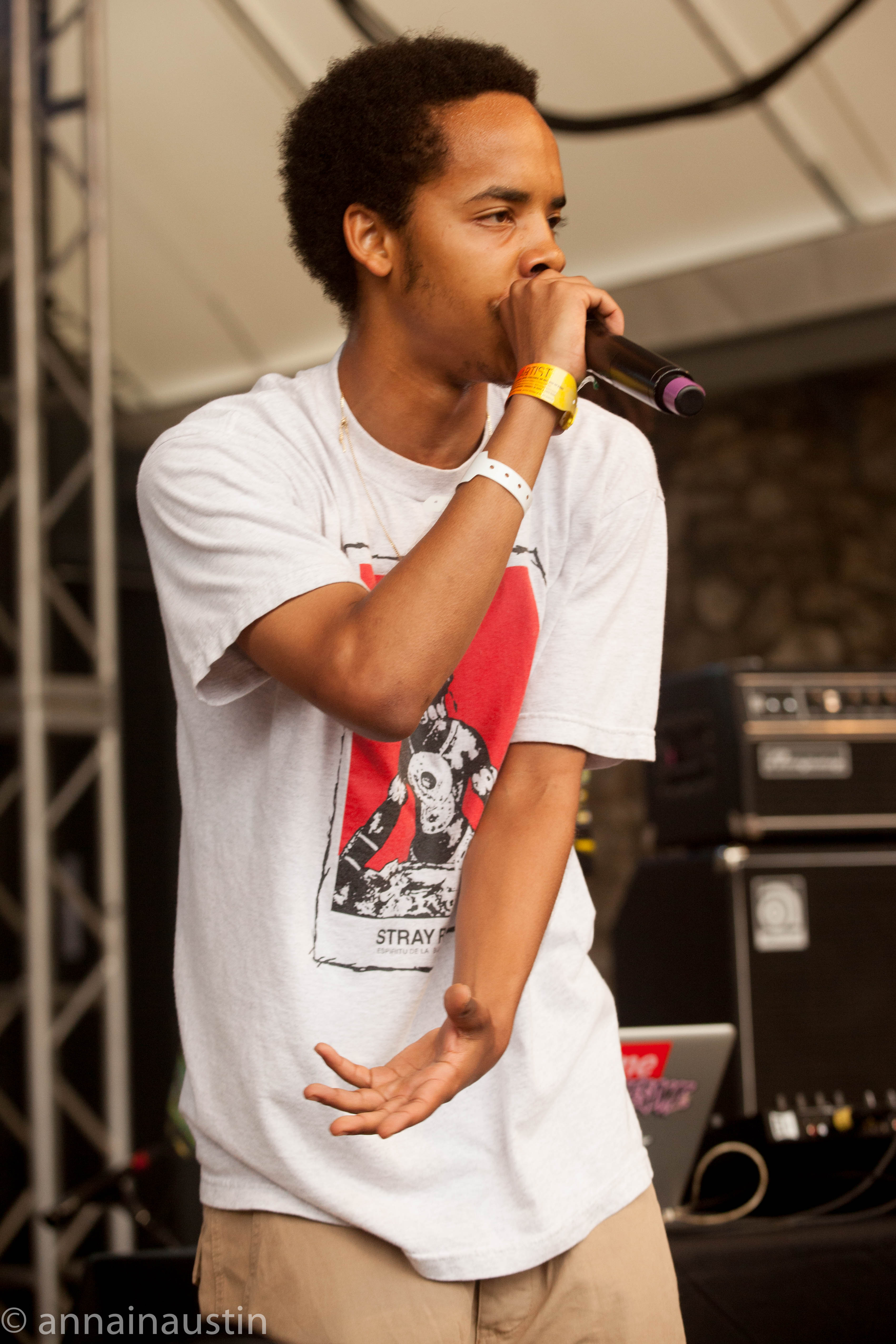
- Earl Sweatshirt performing in March 2015
- Studio albums: 5
- EPs: 2
- Singles: 27
- Music videos: 16
- Mixtapes: 2
- Guest appearances: 29

American rapper and record producer Earl Sweatshirt has released five studio albums, two mixtapes, two extended plays, and 27 singles (including nine as a featured artist).

Earl Sweatshirt released his first mixtape Kitchen Cutlery under the name of Sly Tendencies in 2008. He then joined Odd Future and released the mixtape Earl in 2010. In 2012 he came back as a rapper and was featured on Odd Future's single "Oldie". He released the first single from his debut album in 2012 and later he released the singles "Whoa" featuring Tyler the Creator and "Hive" featuring Vince Staples and Casey Veggies. Doris was released in August 2013 and debuted at number 5 on the albums chart with first week sales of 60,000. The album also debuted at number one on the Top Rap Albums chart. In 2015 Earl released his second studio album I Don't Like Shit, I Don't Go Outside, which was met with critical acclaim. The album sold 30,000 copies in its first week debuting at number 12. His latest album, Live Laugh Love, was released on August 22, 2025.

== Albums ==
=== Studio albums ===
List of studio albums, with selected chart positions and sales figures
Title	Details	Peak chart positions										Sales	Certifications
Title	Details	US	US R&B/HH	US Rap	AUS	CAN	DEN	IRE	NOR	NZ	UK	Sales	Certifications
Doris	Released: August 20, 2013; Label: Tan Cressida, Columbia; Formats: CD, LP, digital download	5	2	1	23	4	14	44	24	34	23	US: 62,000	RIAA: Gold
I Don't Like Shit, I Don't Go Outside	Released: March 23, 2015; Label: Tan Cressida, Columbia; Formats: CD, LP, Digital download	12	4	3	33	8	—	97	—	26	53	US: 30,000	
Some Rap Songs	Released: November 30, 2018; Label: Tan Cressida, Columbia; Formats: CD, LP, Digital download	17	10	9	40	31	—	53	—	35	75		
Sick!	Released: January 14, 2022; Label: Tan Cressida, Warner; Formats: CD, LP, Digital download, streaming	80	45	—	56	82	—	—	—	38	—		
Live Laugh Love	Released: August 22, 2025; Label: Tan Cressida, Warner; Formats: CD, LP, Digital download, streaming	184	—	—	—	—	—	—	—	—	—		
"—" denotes a title that did not chart, or was not released in that territory.

=== Collaborative albums ===
List of collaborative studio albums, with selected details
Title	Details
Voir Dire (with The Alchemist)	Released: August 25, 2023; Label: Tan Cressida, ALC; Formats: CD, LP, digital download, streaming
Pompeii // Utility (with Mike and Surf Gang)	Released: April 3, 2026; Label: Tan Cressida, 10k, Surf Gang Records; Formats: Digital download, streaming

== Mixtapes ==
List of mixtapes, with release details
Title	Album details
Kitchen Cutlery (as Sly Tendencies)	Released: July 2009; Label: Self-released; Formats: digital download
Earl	Released: March 31, 2010; Label: Self-released; Formats: digital download

== Extended plays ==
List of extended plays, with selected chart positions and details
Title	Details	Peak chart positions
Title	Details	US
Solace (as dar Qness)	Released: April 28, 2015; Label: Tan Cressida; Format: Digital download	—
Feet of Clay	Released: November 1, 2019; Label: Tan Cressida, Warner; Formats: CD, LP, Digital download, streaming	102

== Singles ==
=== As lead artist ===
List of singles as lead artist, with selected chart positions, showing year released and album name
Title	Year	Peak chart positions		Certifications	Album
Title	Year	US R&B/HH	NZ Hot	Certifications	Album
"Chum"	2012	—	—	RIAA: Gold; RMNZ: Gold	Doris
"Whoa" (featuring Tyler, the Creator)	2013	46	—		Doris
"Hive" (featuring Casey Veggies and Vince Staples)	2013	— (Note: "Hive" did not enter the Billboard Hot R&B/Hip-Hop Songs chart, but peaked at number seven on the Bubbling Under R&B/Hip-Hop Singles chart.)	—	RIAA: Gold	Doris
"45"	2014	—	—		Non-album singles
"Quest/Power"	2015	—	—		Non-album singles
"Grief"	2015	—	—		I Don't Like Shit, I Don't Go Outside
"Wind In My Sails"	2016	—	—		Non-album single
"Balance" (featuring Knxwledge)	2016	—	—		Adult Swim Singles Program 2016
"Nowhere2go"	2018	—	34		Some Rap Songs
"The Mint" (featuring Navy Blue)	2018	—	—		Some Rap Songs
"Farm" (with Stoney Willis)	2019	—	—		Non-album single
"East"	2019	—	—		Feet of Clay
"Whole World" (featuring Maxo)	2020	—	—		Feet of Clay (Deluxe)
"2010"	2021	—	—		Sick!
"Tabula Rasa" (featuring Armand Hammer)	2021	—	—		Sick!
"Making the Band (Danity Kane)"	2023	—	—		Non-album single
"Sentry" (with The Alchemist featuring MIKE)	2023	—	—		Voir Dire
"The Caliphate" (with The Alchemist featuring Vince Staples)	2023	—	—		Voir Dire
"—" denotes a recording that did not chart or was not released in that territory.

=== As featured artist ===
List of singles as featured artist, with selected chart positions and certifications, showing year released and album name
Title	Year	Peak chart positions			Certifications	Album
Title	Year	US R&B/HH Bub.	UK	UK R&B	Certifications	Album
"Elimination Chamber" (Domo Genesis and The Alchemist featuring Earl Sweatshirt, Vince Staples and Action Bronson)	2012	—	—	—		No Idols
"Super Rich Kids" (Frank Ocean featuring Earl Sweatshirt)	2012	4	145	20	RIAA: Gold; ARIA: 2× Platinum; BPI: Gold; RMNZ: 2× Platinum	Channel Orange
"Reform School" (Boldy James featuring Earl Sweatshirt, Dash and Domo Genesis)	2013	—	—	—		My 1st Chemistry Set
"Really Doe" (Danny Brown featuring Kendrick Lamar, Ab-Soul and Earl Sweatshirt)	2016	—	—	—		Atrocity Exhibition
"E. Coli" (The Alchemist featuring Earl Sweatshirt)	2018	—	—	—		Bread EP
"Nu Stogie" (Stoney Willis featuring Earl Sweatshirt)	2018	—	—	—		Non-album singles
"Ion Rap Beef (Remix)" (Drakeo the Ruler featuring Earl Sweatshirt and 03 Greedo)	2020	—	—	—		Non-album singles
"Real hiphop" (Niontay featuring El Cousteau, MIKE and Earl Sweatshirt)	2023	—	—	—		Demon Muppy
"Words2LiveBy" (El Cousteau featuring Earl Sweatshirt)	2024	—	—	—		Merci, Non Merci
"nonchalant" (Cletus Strap featuring Earl Sweatshirt)	2026	—	—	—		rappers suck.

== Other charted songs ==
List of other charted songs, with selected chart positions, showing year released and album name
Title	Year	Peak chart positions	Album
Title	Year	NZ Hot	Album
"Shattered Dreams"	2018	30	Some Rap Songs
"Red Water"	2018	39	Some Rap Songs
"December 24"	2018	36	Some Rap Songs

== Guest appearances ==
List of non-single guest appearances, with other performing artists, showing year released and album name
Title	Year	Artist(s)	Album
"AssMilk"	2009	Tyler, The Creator	Bastard
"copKiller"	2010	MellowHype	YelloWhite
"Stick Up"	2010	Mike G	Ali
"Chordoroy"	2010	MellowHype, Tyler, The Creator	BlackenedWhite
"PNCINTLOFWGKTA"	2012	Casey Veggies, Tyler, The Creator, Domo Genesis, Hodgy Beats	Customized Greatly Vol. 3
"Between Friends"	2012	Flying Lotus, Captain Murphy	Duality
"The Daily News"	2012	Domo Genesis, The Alchemist, SpaceGhostPurrp, Action Bronson	No Idols
"Gamebreaker"	2012	Domo Genesis, The Alchemist	No Idols
"P2"	2012	MellowHype	Numbers
"Rusty"	2013	Tyler, The Creator, Domo Genesis	Wolf
"Yacht Lash"	2013	Harry Fraud, Riff Raff	High Tide
"One Take"	2013	The Jet Age of Tomorrow, Casey Veggies	JellyFish Mentality
"I'm Not Real"	2013	Mac Miller	Watching Movies with the Sound Off
"Between Villains"	2013	Flying Lotus, Captain Murphy, Viktor Vaughn, Thundercat	Ideas+drafts+loops
"Look"	2013	MellowHigh, Tyler, The Creator	Non-album single
"Cold World"	2013	MellowHigh, Remy Banks	MellowHigh
"Bill"	2013	Delusional Thomas, Bill	Delusional Thomas
"Robes"	2014	Freddie Gibbs, Madlib, Domo Genesis	Piñata
"Polo Jeans"	2014	Mac Miller, Ab-Soul	Faces
"New Faces v2"	2014	Mac Miller, Dash	Faces
"Knucklehead"	2014	G Herbo	Non-album single
"Play It Cool"	2015	Gangrene, Samuel T. Herring	Welcome to Los Santos
"Warlord Leather"	2015	The Alchemist, Action Bronson	Non-album single
"Mirror"	2016	Samiyam	Animals Have Feelings
"New earlsweatshirt (Interlude)"	2018	Vince Staples	FM!
"Easter Sunday"	2019	Zelooperz	Dyn-o-mite
"Mittrom"	2019	Mach-Hommy	Wap Konn Jòj!
"Mirage"	2020	Quelle Chris, Chris Keys, Denmark Vessey, Merrill Garbus, Big Sen	Innocent Country 2
"Ramesses II"	2020	Armand Hammer, Moor Mother, Fielded	Shrines
"Allstar"	2020	MIKE	Weight of the World
"Soon Jah Due"	2020	Mach-Hommy	Mach's Hard Lemonade
"Mo(u)rning"	2020	Black Noi$e	Oblivion
"Falling Out the Sky"	2021	Armand Hammer, The Alchemist	Haram
"Nobles"	2021	The Alchemist, Navy Blue	This Thing of Ours
"Loose Change"	2021	The Alchemist	This Thing of Ours
"Photographic Memories"	2021	Boldy James, The Alchemist, Roc Marciano	Bo Jackson
"All I Need"	2021	Wiki, Navy Blue	Half God
"Bad Fruit"	2022	Jean Dawson	Chaos Now
"Cocaine on my Sweatshirt "	2023	Stove God Cooks	If These Kitchen Walls Could Talk
"RIP Tracy"	2023	The Alchemist, Billy Woods	Flying High
"Plz don’t cut my wings"	2023	MIKE	Burning Desire
"On God"	2024	MIKE, Tony Seltzer, Tony Shhnow	Pinball
"WalkOnBy"	2024	NxWorries, Rae Khalil	Why Lawd?
"Words2LiveBy"	2024	El Cousteau	Merci, Non Merci
"Jumanji"	2025	MIKE, Tony Seltzer	Pinball II
"As Expected"	2025	Tomibillsbigger	Ball Game
"Great"	2025	Tomibillsbigger	Kept Ballin
"Landgrab"	2025	MAVI	Non-album single
"Pico"	2025	El Cousteau	Dirty Harry 2
"Proud of Me"	2025	BNYX	Loading...
"California Games"	2025	Armand Hammer, The Alchemist	Mercy
"24 Gospel"	2025	Navy Blue	The Sword & the Soaring
"Cressidaway!/TPGeeK"	2025	Niontay	Soulja Hate Repellant
"Belladonna"	2026	Navy Blue	Sir Render
"I Know That Man"	2026	Erykah Badu, The Alchemist	Before the World Blows

== Music videos ==
List of music videos, with directors, showing year released
Title	Year	Director(s)
"Earl"	2010	AG Rojas
"Chum"	2012	Hiro Murai
"Whoa" (featuring Tyler, the Creator)	2013	Wolf Haley
"Hive" (featuring Casey Veggies and Vince Staples)	2013	Hiro Murai
"Grief"	2015	Hiro Murai
"Off Top"	2015	Taylor Johnson
"Nowhere, Nobody"	2019	Naima Ramos-Chapman, Terence Nance
"East"	2019	Realest photographer ever
"2010"	2021	Ryosuke Tanzawa
"Tabula Rasa" (featuring Armand Hammer)	2021	Joseph Mault
"Titanic"	2022	Rodney Passe
"Making the Band (Danity Kane)"	2023	Hidji world, yga
"Sentry" (with The Alchemist featuring MIKE)	2023	Ryosuke Tanzawa
"The Caliphate" (with The Alchemist featuring Vince Staples)	2023	Joseph Mault
"Vin Skully" (with The Alchemist )	2023	Ryosuke Tanzawa
"100 High Street" (with The Alchemist )	2023	Ryosuke Tanzawa

== Featured Videos ==
Name	Year	Director
Oldie (Odd Future)	2012	Lance Bangz
Easter Sunday 97 (ZeLooperz feat. Earl)	2019	@realestphotographerever
Mo(u)rning (Black Noi$e feat. Earl)	2020	Aaron Hymes
Loose Change (The Alchemist feat. Earl)	2021	Lonewolf
Nobles (The Alchemist feat.Earl & Navy Blue)	2021	Ryosuke Tanzawa
Falling out the Sky (Armand Hammer, The Alchemist feat. Earl)	2021	Joseph Mault
All I Need (Wiki feat. Earl)	2022	Ryosuke Tanzawa
RIP Tracy (The Alchemist feat. Earl & billy woods)	2023	JOSEPH
Words2LiveBy (El Coustea feat. Earl)	2024	NickyxBoots
Landsgrab (MAVI feat. Earl)	2025	Jesse Fox Hallen

== See also ==
- Earl Sweatshirt production discography
