= Earl Sweatshirt production discography =

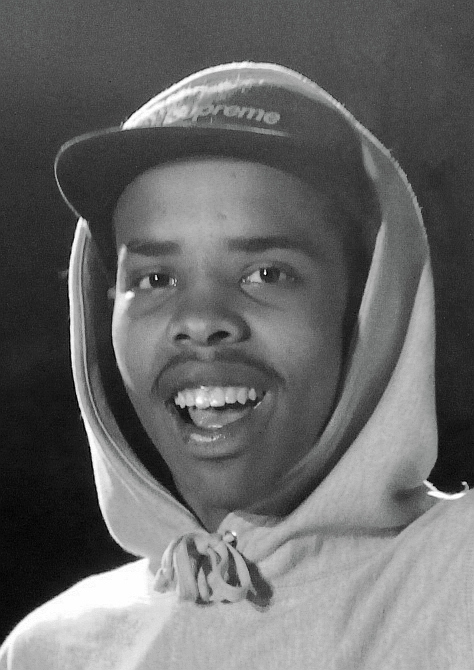
Earl Sweatshirt in March 2013

The following is a discography of production by American rapper and record producer Earl Sweatshirt. He was often credited as randomblackdude in his early years of producing, however, he has apparently dropped the pseudonym, now being credited as Earl Sweatshirt or even sometimes as his real name Thebe Kgositsile.

== 2009 ==
=== Sly Tendencies – Kitchen Cutlery ===
- 11. "Number 4 (Instrumental)"

== 2012 ==
=== Earl Sweatshirt ===
- "Chum" (produced with Christian Rich and Chad Hugo)

== 2013 ==
=== Kilo Kish – K+ ===
- 04. "Trappin'" (featuring Vince Staples)

=== Mac Miller – Watching Movies with the Sound Off ===
- 01. "The Star Room"
- 03. "I'm Not Real" (featuring Earl Sweatshirt)

=== Dash – V.I.C.E.S ===
- 12. "Whalé" (featuring Ab-Soul and Retch)

=== Earl Sweatshirt – Doris ===
- 03. "20 Wave Caps" (featuring Domo Genesis) (produced with Samiyam)
- 04. "Sunday" (featuring Frank Ocean) (produced with Frank Ocean)
- 05. "Hive" (featuring Vince Staples and Casey Veggies) (produced with Matt Martians)
- 06. "Chum" (produced with Christian Rich and Chad Hugo)
- 09. "523"
- 10. "Uncle Al" (produced with The Alchemist)
- 11. "Guild" (featuring Mac Miller)

=== Delusional Thomas – Delusional Thomas ===
- 04. "Bill" (featuring Earl Sweatshirt and Bill) (produced with Larry Fisherman)

== 2014 ==
=== Earl Sweatshirt ===
- "Nebraska" (featuring Mac Miller and Vince Staples)

=== Mac Miller – Faces ===
- 09. "Polo Jeans" (featuring Earl Sweatshirt)
- 23. "New Faces v2" (featuring Earl Sweatshirt and Dash)

=== Mac Miller ===
- "The Star Room (OG Version)"

=== Earl Sweatshirt ===
- "Snakeskin Shirt (Instrumental)"

=== Matt Martians ===
- "Horn" (produced with Matt Martians)

=== Lil Herb ===
- "Knucklehead" (featuring Earl Sweatshirt)

== 2015 ==
=== Mike G – Award Tour II ===
- 05. "Jameson" (produced with Jack Frost)

=== Earl Sweatshirt – I Don't Like Shit, I Don't Go Outside ===
- 01. "Huey"
- 02. "Mantra"
- 03. "Faucet"
- 04. "Grief"
- 06. "Grown Ups" (featuring Dash)
- 07. "AM // Radio" (featuring Wiki)
- 08. "Inside"
- 09. "DNA" (featuring Na'kel)
- 10. "Wool" (featuring Vince Staples)

=== Earl Sweatshirt – Solace ===
- 01. "Solace"

=== Dash – 17 More Minutes ===
- 12. "Komin' Klean"

=== Njomza and Mac Miller ===
- "Creatures of the Night" (featuring Delusional Thomas) (produced with Larry Fisherman)

== 2016 ==
=== Earl Sweatshirt ===
- "Bary"
- "Skrt Skrt"
- "Pelicula"

=== Currensy and The Alchemist – The Carrollton Heist: Remixed ===
- 07. "The Mack Book Remix"

=== Mach-Hommy ===
- "Henrietta Lax"

== 2017 ==
=== Denmark Vessey – Martin Lucid Dream ===
- 10. "Snowing in LA"

=== Tha God Fahim – Dump Goat ===
- 06. "Don't Go Summer"

=== Mach-Hommy – Dump Gawd: Hommy Edition ===
- 04. "Allen Iverson" (featuring Heem Stogied)
- 06. "DNA Swab" (featuring Tha God Fahim)
- 07. "Nothin' But Net" (featuring Your Old Droog)

=== Wiki – No Mountains in Manhattan ===
- 11. "Wiki New Written"
- 16. "Leppy Coqui" (produced with Alex Epton and Tony Seltzer)

=== Medhane – Do For Self ===
- 05. "Agoura134"

=== Tha God Fahim – Dump Goat ===
- 12. "Don't Go Summer"

=== Mach-Hommy – Fete Des Morts AKA Dia De Los Muertos ===
- 01. "Henrietta Lax"
- 02. "TTFN" (featuring JuJu Gotti)
- 04. "Basin Bleu"
- 05. "Carpe DM" (featuring Kungg Fuu)
- 06. "Manje Midi"
- 07. "Bride of The Water G-d"
- 08. "THEJIGISUP"

== 2018 ==
=== Denmark Vessey – Sun Go Nova ===
- 01. "Zzzzz" (featuring ADaD)
- 02. "Trustfall"
- 05. "Sellout" (featuring DrxQuinnx and Vic Spencer)

=== Mach-Hommy and Tha God Fahim – Notorious Dump Legends ===
- 03. "Baleen Pocketknife"

=== Earl Sweatshirt – Some Rap Songs ===
- 01. "Shattered Dreams"
- 02. "Red Water"
- 03. "Cold Summers"
- 06. "Ontheway!" (featuring Standing on the Corner)
- 09. "Loosie"
- 11. "Eclipse"
- 12. "Veins"
- 13. "Playing Possum" (featuring Cheryl Harris and Keorapetse Kgositsile)
- 14. "Peanut"
- 15. "Riot!" (produced with Shamel of SOTC)

=== Tha God Fahim – Dump Truck 7 ===
- 04. "Location: State of Mind"

== 2019 ==
=== Lucki – Freewave 3 ===
- 13. "All In"

=== Solange – When I Get Home ===
- 07. "Dreams" (outro)

=== Mach-Hommy – Wap Konn Jòj! ===
- 04. "Time Face"
- 06. "Mittrom" (featuring Earl Sweatshirt)

=== Mavi – Let the Sun Talk ===
- 08. "Sense"

=== Earl Sweatshirt – Feet of Clay ===
- 01. "74"
- 02. "East"
- 04. "OD"
- 06. "Tisk Tisk / Cookies"
- 07. "4N" (featuring Mach-Hommy)

== 2020 ==
=== Armand Hammer – Shrines ===
- 01. "Bitter Cassava" (featuring Pink Siifu)

=== Mach-Hommy – Mach's Hard Lemonade ===
- 02. "Soon Jah Due" (featuring Earl Sweatshirt) (produced with Messiah Musik)
- 05. "Photocopy Sloppy (Dump Fraud)"

== 2021 ==
=== Armand Hammer and The Alchemist – Haram ===
- 06. "God's Feet" (produced with The Alchemist)

== 2022 ==
=== Earl Sweatshirt – Sick! ===
- 03. "Sick!" (recording engineer)
- 05. "Tabula Rasa" (featuring Armand Hammer) (recording engineer)
- 08. "God Laughs" (recording engineer)

=== Armand Hammer – WHT LBL ===
- 06. "Flummox"
- 07. "¿Tu Tienes WiFi?"

== 2023 ==
=== Mac Miller – Watching Movies with the Sound Off (10th Anniversary Edition) ===
- 20. "The Star Room (OG Version)" (with Earl Sweatshirt)

=== Akai Solo – Verticality///Singularity ===
- 02. "Bespoke"

=== Akai Solo – Only The Strong Remain ===
- 03. "Twin Flame"

== 2024 ==
=== RealYungPhil ===
- "You Know" (produced with Harrison)

=== Pink Siifu – Got Food At the Crib!!! Vol.4 ===
- 06. "Both Feet" (featuring Maxo)

== 2025 ==
=== Earl Sweatshirt – Live Laugh Love ===
- 11. "Exhaust" (produced with Navy Blue)

== 2026 ==
=== Sideshow – Tigray Funk ===
- 19. "Solid Snake"

=== Earl Sweatshirt, MIKE, and Surf Gang – Pompeii // Utility ===
- 03. "Da Bid" (featuring Jadasea) (produced with Harrison, Flea Diamonds, and Omari Lyseight)
- 04. "Not 4tw" (featuring Anysia Kym) (produced with Harrison)
- 19. "React" (produced with Harrison and Osyris Israel)
- 23. "Quikk" (produced with Harrison)
- 30. "Book of Eli" (produced with Harrison and Tony Seltzer)

=== Harrison – Taking a walk & calling a car home ===
- 04. "officeloop with t + e" (produced with Harrison and Elipropperr)

=== Jadasea – Holly Grove ===
- 02. "Strainz" (produced with Harrison)

=== Cletus Strap – rappers suck. ===
- 01. "paddleball" (produced with Omari Lyseight)

== See also ==
- Earl Sweatshirt discography
