= Alexander Spit =

American rapper

- Born: Alexander Albert Manzano; 1987 (age 38–39); San Francisco, California, United States
- Origin: Los Angeles, California, United States
- Genres: Hip hop
- Occupation: Rapper
- Years active: 2009–present
- Labels: Decon; Mass Appeal; The Hundreds

Alexander Albert Manzano (born 1987), better known as his stage name Alexander Spit, is an American rapper and record producer from Los Angeles, California. He released his commercial debut full-length on January 29, 2013, on Decon Records.

== Biography ==
Spit grew up in the Bay Area to a Filipino mother and San Francisco-raised father. Spit's first foray into rap music was with a group called The Instant Messengers. At 21, Spit went solo and released his first album Open 24 Hours when he turned 23. The album, as well as his subsequent project Until Next Summer (2010), were released through local streetwear company The Hundreds. After the success of his instrumental tape, Mansions, which landed on Complex Magazine's "50 Best Albums of 2012 (So Far)", Spit began work on his commercial debut. The album was called A Breathtaking Trip To That Otherside and was inspired by his move to Los Angeles and hallucinogenic drugs. It was released on Decon Records in January 2013 and featured E-40, The Alchemist and Action Bronson.

== Discography ==
=== Studio albums ===
List of studio albums, with selected chart positions and certifications
Title	Album details	Peak chart positions		
Title	Album details	US	US R&B	US Rap
A Breathtaking Trip to That Otherside	Released: January 29, 2013; Label: Decon Records; Formats: CD, digital download	—	—	—

=== Mixtapes ===
List of mixtapes, with year released
Title	Album details
Open 24 Hours	Label: The Hundreds; Formats: digital download
Until Next Summer	Released: 2010; Label: The Hundreds; Formats: digital download
These Long Strange Nights	Released: October, 2011; Formats: digital download
Mansions	Released: 2012; Formats: digital download
Mansions 2	Released: 2013; Formats: digital download
Dillinger	Released: 2013; Formats: digital download

=== Singles ===
List of singles, with selected chart positions and certifications, showing year released and album name
Title	Year	Peak chart positions			Album
Title	Year	US	US R&B	US Rap	Album
Artesia / Getaway Car	Released: 2013; Formats: 7" vinyl, digital download				

== Production discography ==
=== 2015 ===
Pell - Limbo

- 10. "Sandlot"

=== 2017 ===
Homeboy Sandman - Veins

- 09. "Lemon Ginger Tea"

Linkin Park - One More Light

- 08. "Halfway Right" (additional producer)

Jay IDK - IWasVeryBad

- 12. "Baby Scale" (featuring Yung Gleesh) (produced with Razjah)

=== 2018 ===
Duckwrth -

- "Michuul"

Mac Miller - Swimming

- 06. "Wings"

=== 2019 ===
Duckwrth - I'm Uugly

- 10. "Ruun"

=== 2020 ===
lojii - lo&behold

- 09. "Each Day (I Pray For)"
- 13. "Longwayhome"

Mac Miller - Circles

- 14. "Floating" (produced with Mac Miller and Jon Brion)

Sideshow - Farley

- 05. "Vrrydrrty_2" (featuring Zelooperz and MIKE)

Medhane - Cold Water

- 08. "Na Fr" (produced with Super Miles)

All City Jimmy - DRFTR

- 02. "DRFTR"

Caleb Giles - Meditations

- additional producer

Mia Carucci -

- "La Loba" (produced with Mia Carucci)

Navy Blue - Song of Sage: Post Panic!

- 05. "Certainty" (featuring Maxo)
- 17. "Enough" (featuring Zeroh)

=== 2021 ===
Sideshow - Wicked Man's Reprise

- 04. "Soul on ICE"
- 05. "Brother Below"
- 06. "Calls From Kemet"
- 10. "Forward Only"
- 12. "Bobby da Physical Body"

Medhane - Amethyst of Morning

- 07. "Who Made the Rain?"

Mia Carucci - As Above So Below

- 01. "Trial of Tears"
- 03. "Primal Deep"

=== 2022 ===
Earl Sweatshirt - Sick!

- 08. "God Laughs"
