= Voir Dire (Earl Sweatshirt and the Alchemist album) =

2023 studio album by Earl Sweatshirt and the Alchemist

- Original cover. Streaming release slightly saturates the image; a curtain also appears in the background

Studio album by Earl Sweatshirt and the Alchemist
- Released: August 25, 2023
- Recorded: Late 2020–2021
- Genre: Hip-hop
- Length: 25:21; 26:37 (streaming edition); 33:34 (ALC Edition)
- Labels: Tan Cressida; ALC; Gala; Warner
- Producer: The Alchemist

Earl Sweatshirt chronology
Sick! (2022)	Voir Dire (2023)	Live Laugh Love (2025)

The Alchemist chronology
Flying High (2023)	Voir Dire (2023)	Faith Is a Rock (2023)

Singles from Voir Dire
- 1. "Sentry" Released: August 24, 2023; 2. "The Caliphate" Released: September 15, 2023

Voir Dire (/ˈvwɑːr dɪər/; Latinate Old French for 'speak the truth') is a collaborative album by American rapper Earl Sweatshirt and record producer the Alchemist. It was released via Gala Music on August 25, 2023; a further release on streaming platforms followed on October 6.

== Background ==
On May 22, 2021, The Alchemist published a tweet saying "[Earl and I] hid a whole album on YouTube under a fake name and YouTube page. Fake album cover, song titles, the whole 9. Nobody found it yet."

In August 2023, fans discovered a link on Earl's website that leads to a page on Gala Music's website which updates everyday with a new puzzle that, when solved, reveals a new hint about the album. The first puzzle asked "When did Al[chemist] start snitching?" and allowed users to select a specific date. Upon entering the date the aforementioned tweet was published (05/22/2021), the first clue, consisting of another Alchemist tweet, was revealed. This tweet read "Speak the Truth", the English translation of the phrase "Voir Dire".

On August 22, the Alchemist posted a picture containing the album's track list to Instagram. The feature listing next to the track "Sentry" was blurred on the post. On August 24, it was revealed that this feature is New York-based rapper Mike after a music video for "Sentry" was released on the Gala Music website.

A flyer for a listening party, to take place in London on August 25, was posted to The Alchemist's Instagram on August 23.

On August 25, Voir Dire was released for free on the Gala Music website along with 11 NFTs, one for each of the tracks.

On September 15, it was announced that Voir Dire would be released on streaming platforms on October 6, featuring a slightly altered tracklist which includes two songs with fellow collaborator Vince Staples.

== Controversy ==
There was a large controversy after the decision to make it a Non-fungible token (NFT). In response, they apologised and released an extra track for the streaming.

== Tour ==
Voir Dire Tour
- Tour by Earl Sweatshirt & The Alchemist
- Associated album: Voir Dire
- Start date: November 6, 2023
- End date: November 27, 2023
- Legs: 1
- No. of shows: 11
- Supporting acts: MIKE; Black Noi$e

Earl Sweatshirt & The Alchemist concert chronology
- Doris 10th Anniversary Mini-Tour (2023); Voir Dire Tour (2023); European Tour (2024)

In September 2023, the Voir Dire Tour was announced in support of the album. Black Noi$e and MIKE are set to join the tour alongside Earl Sweatshirt and the Alchemist.

== Critical reception ==
Professional ratings
Aggregate scores
Source	Rating
AnyDecentMusic?	7.4/10
Metacritic	83/100
Review scores
Source	Rating
AllMusic	4/5 stars
Beats per Minute	86%
Clash	8/10
HipHopDX	3.8/5
The Line of Best Fit	8/10
MusicOMH	3.5/5 stars
Pitchfork	7.8/10

Voir Dire was met with critical acclaim from music critics. At Metacritic, which assigns a normalized rating out of 100 to reviews from mainstream publications, the album received an average score of 83, based on nine reviews.

John Wohlmacher of Beats Per Minute wrote: "The dire gloom of the early years is gone, and the garbled mutations of Some Rap Songs and Feet of Clay have grown in clarity without losing any of their labyrinthine and gothic dynamics. Without calling a masterpiece just yet: this is a very special moment, both for Thebe and his fans. I leave the rest to Two-Face and the flip of his coin". Robin Murray of Clash stated: "together, this project might rank as a career high, a work of breathless yet intoxicatingly accessible complexity". Noah Barker of The Line of Best Fit wrote: "if anything, Voir Dire is a record that pulls itself apart as it continues, subtly dredging the listener in philosophical bile and pause-the-track one-liners". Dean van Nguyen of Pitchfork found it "a little disappointing that Alchemist doesn't push Earl even further out of his comfort zone" but found their "chemistry [...] comes from how naturally their styles blend together, as if Voir Dire is some kind of prophecy being fulfilled by the universe. It's a record that was meant to be: simple, elegant, and always true". Ben Devlin of musicOMH wrote: "By the time Free The Ruler's soulful loop fades out, we've only concluded in the loosest sense. The listener enters Earl's world in medias res and 25 minutes later he's still maintaining, still working everything out, but the journey's been nuanced and engaging".

In the review for AllMusic, Fred Thomas concluded that, "Voir Dire pushes the bounds of both Alchemist's old school warmth and Earl's heady verses, landing someplace new that neither would have gotten to on their own."

== Track listing ==
All songs are produced by The Alchemist.

All lyrics are written by Thebe Kgositsile, except for "Sentry", by Kgositsile and Michael Bonema and "Mancala" and "The Caliphate", by Vincent Staples; all music is composed by Alan Daniel Maman.

Voir Dire track listing
No.	Title	Length
1.	"100 High Street"	1:34
2.	"Vin Skully"	1:53
3.	"Sentry" (featuring MIKE)	2:21
4.	"All the Small Things"	1:59
5.	"My Brother, the Wind"	2:09
6.	"27 Braids"	2:04
7.	"Mac Deuce"	2:08
8.	"Sirius Blac"	2:19
9.	"Geb"	2:47
10.	"Dead Zone"	3:41
11.	"Free the Ruler"	2:26
Total length:		25:21

Streaming release
No.	Title	Length
1.	"100 High Street"	1:34
2.	"Vin Skully"	1:53
3.	"Sentry" (featuring MIKE)	2:16
4.	"Heat Check"	2:29
5.	"Mancala" (featuring Vince Staples)	2:41
6.	"27 Braids"	2:05
7.	"Mac Deuce"	2:08
8.	"Sirius Blac"	2:08
9.	"Dead Zone"	3:07
10.	"The Caliphate" (featuring Vince Staples)	3:50
11.	"Free the Ruler"	2:26
Total length:		26:37

ALC Edition (Vinyl exclusive)
No.	Title	Length
1.	"100 High Street"	1:34
2.	"Vin Skully"	1:53
3.	"Sentry" (featuring MIKE)	2:16
4.	"Heat Check"	2:29
5.	"Mancala" (featuring Vince Staples)	2:41
6.	"27 Braids"	2:05
7.	"Mac Deuce"	2:08
8.	"Sirius Blac"	2:08
9.	"Geb"	2:49
10.	"Dead Zone"	3:07
11.	"The Caliphate" (featuring Vince Staples)	3:50
12.	"Free the Ruler"	2:26
13.	"All the Small Things"	1:59
14.	"My Brother, the Wind"	2:09
Total length:		33:34

== Charts ==
Chart performance for Voir Dire
Chart (2023–2024)	Peak position
Belgian Albums (Ultratop Flanders)	143
Hungarian Physical Albums (MAHASZ)	5
UK Album Downloads (Official Charts)	63
UK R&B Albums (Official Charts)	11
US Top Album Sales (Billboard)	12
