= The Sword & the Soaring =

2025 studio album by Navy Blue

Studio album by Navy Blue
- Released: November 11, 2025
- Genre: Hip-hop
- Length: 43:46
- Label: Freedom Sounds
- Producers: Navy Blue; Malik Abdul-Rahmaan; Akabluesky; Animoss; Child Actor; Chris Keys; Demahjiae; Foisey; Graymaatter; Jason Wool; Mejiwahn; Sebb Bash; ShunGu

Navy Blue chronology
Memoirs in Armour (2024)	The Sword & the Soaring (2025)	Sir Render (2026)

Singles from The Sword & the Soaring
- 1. "Orchards" Released: October 29, 2025

The Sword & the Soaring is the ninth solo studio album by the American rapper Navy Blue. It was released on November 11, 2025, through Freedom Sounds Records. The album features a sole guest appearance from longtime collaborator Earl Sweatshirt.

The album was met with widespread critical acclaim. It is the second album in a trilogy of releases, referred to by Navy Blue as the "Knighthood" trilogy, following 2024's Memoirs in Armour and preceding 2026's Sir Render.

== Background ==
Sage Elsesser is known as an American skateboarder who is known as Navy Blue in his hip-hop career, having gained traction for releasing projects including Àdá Irin (2020) The Reprise (2021), and Ways of Knowing (2023), with the latter released through Def Jam Recordings. By early 2024, Navy Blue was dropped by Def Jam, returning back to releasing independent albums. In August 2024, he released his eighth solo studio album, Memoirs in Armour, to critical acclaim.

== Composition ==
=== Overview ===
The Sword & the Soaring is a hip-hop album consisting of sixteen tracks at a runtime of nearly forty-four minutes. Andrew Sacher of BrooklynVegan described the album's sonic influences as based on "a backdrop of jazzy keys, sweeping string and horn arrangements", soul samples, and loops of psychedelic rock and psychedelic folk. Compared to Navy Blue's past projects based on introspection and concise meditation, The Sword & the Soaring captures themes of lessons he reminds himself, including loss, faith, grief, and restraint.

According to Matthew Richie of Pitchfork, the album contains motifs of Michael, an archangel prominent in Judaism, Islam, and Christianity, under beats that compile like "individual pieces of an ancietn cipher." While the album highlights Navy Blue's angst, he expresses his mourning of fellow Brownsville rapper and close friend Ka, regrets from his childhood, and optimism with love for his family and friends.

Hip Hop Golden Age considered the album's production to be based on loose drums, dusty samples, and meditative loops, while keeping rhythm intact at its "most stripped-down moments". The reviewer also compared Navy Blue's production and writing on the album to the late Brownsville rapper Ka through his pacing and phrasing, and to Killah Priest for his meditative themes, representing lived philosophy. Multiple producers took involvement in the album, including Child Actor, Chris Keys, Graymatter, Foisey, Malik Abdul-Rahmaan, Jason Wool, ShunGu, and Sebb Bash, among others.

=== Tracks ===
Opening with piano tracks on the first track, "The Bloodletter", it contains sparse drums and a "low, flickering bassline" reminiscent of a heartbeat. Lyrically, Navy Blue names the act of survival with its dramatization, reflecting on emotional wounds and discipline it took through these experience. The second track, "Orchards", continues the use of soft piano tracks with vocal samples that sound like they were "lifted from a weathered reel." Rapping with deliberate phrasing, Navy Blue turns private reflection into a form of quiet mantra.

The third track, "God's Kingdom", shows Navy Blue reflecting on family history, including devastating moments of loss with healing from them, through "gentle piano tons and brushed drums". Lyrics include how he was out on "Beale Street with my cousin Reggie" following the death of his aunt and uncle, seeking solace in Mississippi where is family roots remain. Compared to Navy Blue's past projects, he shares more direct writing through personal clarity. The fourth track, "Sunlight of the Spirit", contains a light instrumental with a looping piano figure and barely any percussion, lyrically based on themes of growing up and finding a sense of home and no longer rushing on catharsis. The track a "heavenly vocal sample wailing above him" and an interjecting flute resembling a call-and-response with the Navy Blue's baritone register.

The fifth track, "Guardadas", which means the word "saved" in Spanish, emphasizes the phrase, "Felt love too scared to enact it", as his voice barely rises above a whisper, metaphorically writing like it's a love letter before rapping about spiritual resurrection. Sonically, it consists of a "seedy saxophone loop" akin to being heard in a Harlem jazz bar. The seventh track, "Tale of Truth", lays Navy Blue's vocals through lush orchestral crescendos based on peace despite past tragedy.

The tenth track, "If Only...", features a more vulnerable approach, with the beat fading to silence while the track functions like a conversation that is "part memory, part confession", confronting expectations, regrets, and pain without a performative manner. During an interview with Clash upon the album's release, Navy Blue revealed the track represents a message to his father and their relationship. The twelfth track, "24 Gospel", features an appearance from fellow rapper Earl Sweatshirt. Based on a "warm soul sample as a foundation", the track represents an extension of Navy Blue's thought process instead of a detour, reflecting on enduracne and transformation.

The fourteenth track, "Soul Investments", explores themes of family and lineage, going through cycles of care and "building something stable out of chaos" as producer Sebb Bash's guitar highlights the track. The fifteenth track, "Sharing Life", follows similar themes from the previous track through a "shimmering soul loop" under calm delivery with gratitute. The sixteenth and final track, "The Phoenix", is highlighted with chimes and piano tracks as Navy Blue focuses on acceptance rather than escape, concluding the album through rebirth without the use of mythology.

== Promotion and release ==
On October 29, 2025, Navy Blue announced a new album under the name The Sword & the Soaring, along with a release date of November 11. It became available for pre-order and was promoted by its lead single, "Orchards", along with an accompanying music video directed by Maxi Hachem. Navy Blue shares his reflection on the single, crediting producer Child Actor for being a "guiding light and force for me and my creative process". On November 8, Navy Blue previewed the album at the Jazz Cafe in Camden Town, London. Three days later, it was released through Freedom Sounds Records.

== Critical reception ==
Hip Hop Golden Age praised the album for its production and writing, giving insight into both aspects and into themes of "healing, discipline, and love without sentimentality", suggesting that The Sword & the Soaring might be his finest work. Alexander Cole of HotNewHipHop recommended listeners to check out the album for "beautifully made instrumentals and heartfelt rapping". Matthew Ritchie described the album as being Navy Blue's "most evocative release in years", praising the album's spiritual lyrics and production.

Andrew Sacher of BrooklynVegan ranked The Sword & the Soaring on his list of "5 Best Rap Albums of November 2025", writing that Navy Blue "waves together layered storytelling and poetic turns of phrase" that elevate the album. Toni Meese of Everything is Noise ranked the album on the list of "The Noise of November 2025", describing the album's production as "personal stories over Nujabes-inspired beats". HotNewHipHop ranked the album at number sixteen on their list of the forty best hip-hop albums of the year, so did Paste at number twenty on their list of 25 and Billboard at number seven of their list of 20.

== Track listing ==
All lyrics are written by Sage Elsesser, excluding "24 Gospel".

No.	Title	Producer(s)	Length
1.	"The Bloodletter"	Chris Keys	2:33
2.	"Orchards"	Child Actor	2:39
3.	"God's Kingdom"	Graymatter	2:40
4.	"Sunlight of the Spirit"	Child Actor	2:51
5.	"Guardadas"	Child Actor	3:14
6.	"My Heartbeat"	Demahjiae	3:07
7.	"Tale of Truth"	Foisey	2:33
8.	"Fight On"	Navy Blue	2:04
9.	"Kindred Spirit"	Child Actor	2:09
10.	"If Only..."	Malik Abdul-Rahmaan; ShunGu	3:41
11.	"Illusions"	Jason Wool; Akabluesky	2:18
12.	"24 Gospel" (featuring Earl Sweatshirt)	Animoss	2:56
13.	"Here & Now"	Navy Blue	1:59
14.	"Soul Investments"	Sebb Bash	2:33
15.	"Sharing Life"	Navy Blue	3:02
16.	"The Phoenix"	Mejiwahn; Navy Blue	3:27
Total length:			43:46

== Personnel ==
Credits are adapted from Bandcamp and Tidal.

- Sage Elsesser – writing, composing (all tracks); producing (8, 13, 15–16)
- Zeroh – mastering
- Joe Visciano – mixing
- Thebe Kgositsile – writing, composing (12)
