= Flying High (EP) =

EP by the Alchemist
- Released: June 30, 2023
- Recorded: May–June 2023
- Length: 26:52
- Label: ALC Records
- Producer: The Alchemist

The Alchemist chronology
The Alchemist Sandwich (2022)	Flying High (2023)	Voir Dire (2023)

Flying High is the seventh solo extended play by musician the Alchemist. It was released on June 30, 2023, through ALC, and features guest appearances from Earl Sweatshirt, Billy Woods, Boldy James, T.F., Mike, Sideshow, Larry June and Jay Worthy.

== Background ==
Following his prolific release history in 2022, having produced four studio projects that year, including his own The Alchemist Sandwich, Maman shared the news of the upcoming record on his social media on June 26, 2023. Fellow artist Earl Sweatshirt promptly shared the announcement on his socials, revealing his prominent input. Maman went on to tag more artists with guest appearances on the EP, including frequent collaborators Mike, Boldy James and Larry June, the latter of which released a collaboration project with Maman only three months prior. While it was speculated that the EP would be a joint album of the Alchemist of and Sweatshirt, neither artist confirmed it.

The cover depicts a 1950s United Airlines advertisement poster of Maman's home Southern California.

== Critical reception ==
Professional ratings
Aggregate scores
Source	Rating
Metacritic	79/100
Review scores
Source	Rating
Clash	7/10
Exclaim!	8/10
HipHopDX	3.9/5
Pitchfork	7.0/10

According to the review aggregator Metacritic, Flying High received "generally favorable reviews" based on a weighted average score of 79 out of 100 from 6 critic scores.

Clash's Robin Murray described it as a "stunning four-track feast, the only downside is that we don't hear more from such a formidable cast" and felt that "the brevity doesn't downplay the creativity". Dylan Green of Pitchfork called it "breezy" and found that it contains "a space for rhymers in Alchemist's orbit to unspool for the fun of it". Green also wrote that "none of these songs sound like demos or leftovers, but Flying High doesn't reach for the stars, either." Wesley McLean of Exclaim! described the album as "a delicious hors d'oeuvre served up while you're waiting for whatever three-course meal that Alchemist has coming next," while also dubbing it "a reminder that Alchemist's circle doubles as a roster of some of the best rappers around." HipHopDX's Anthony Malone described the EP as "an enjoyable listen," but adds that "there's a shrouding feeling that the legendary producer has gotten comfortable creatively."

== Track listing ==
Flying High track listing
No.	Title	Length
1.	"RIP Tracy" (featuring Earl Sweatshirt and Billy Woods)	3:38
2.	"Trouble Man" (featuring TF and Boldy James)	3:10
3.	"Bless" (featuring Mike and Sideshow)	2:59
4.	"Midnight Oil" (featuring Larry June and Jay Worthy)	3:39
5.	"RIP Tracy" (instrumental)	3:38
6.	"Trouble Man" (instrumental)	3:10
7.	"Bless" (instrumental)	2:59
8.	"Midnight Oil" (instrumental)	3:39
Total length:		26:52
