= Sir Render =

2026 studio album by Navy Blue

Studio album by Navy Blue
- Released: June 5, 2026
- Genre: Hip-hop
- Length: 44:51
- Label: Freedom Sounds
- Producers: The Alchemist; Bori; Fahem Erfan; Jason Wool; Malik Abdul-Rahmaan; Mario Luciano; Mike Shabb; Navy Blue; QThree; ShunGu; Vertiqua

Navy Blue chronology
The Sword & the Soaring (2025)	Sir Render (2026)

Sir Render is the tenth solo studio album by the American rapper Navy Blue. Released on June 5, 2026, through Freedom Sounds Records, it is the conclusion to his trilogy, with the previous installments being Memoirs in Armour and The Sword & the Soaring. The album features appearances from Mike Shabb, Armand Hammer, Earl Sweatshirt, as well as a posthumous feature from Ka.

== Production ==
Production credits include: Jason Wool, The Alchemist, Vertiqua, Mike Shabb, Mario Luciano, QThree, Bori, Malik Abdul-Rahmaan, Fahem Erfan, ShunGu, and Navy Blue himself.

== Critical reception ==
The album received a 7.9 from Pitchfork writer Dash Lewis. HipHopGoldenAge gave the album a 9/10 rating.

== Track listing ==
No.	Title	Producer(s)	Length
1.	"Commencement"	Jason Wool	2:37
2.	"Baron"	The Alchemist	2:02
3.	"Sir Render"	Vertiqua	3:05
4.	"Over" (featuring Mike Shabb)	Mike Shabb	3:41
5.	"Reflections"	Jason Wool; Mario Luciano	2:36
6.	"Residuum" (featuring Armand Hammer)	Navy Blue	3:02
7.	"Crux Ansata"	QThree	2:59
8.	"Belladonna" (featuring Earl Sweatshirt)	The Alchemist	2:37
9.	"Aegis"	Navy Blue; Bori	3:32
10.	"Circa" (featuring Ka)	Malik Abdul-Rahmaan	3:55
11.	"If God Had Legs"	Jason Wool; Fahem Erfan	2:51
12.	"Next Life"	ShunGu	1:48
13.	"The Birth of Medicine"	ShunGu	2:59
14.	"Bleeding Scarlet"	Navy Blue	3:59
15.	"F.E.A.R (Bonus Track)"	Navy Blue	3:01
Total length:			44:51
