= Live Laugh Love (Earl Sweatshirt album) =

Studio album by Earl Sweatshirt
- Released: August 22, 2025
- Genre: Hip-hop
- Length: 24:08
- Labels: Tan Cressida; Warner
- Producers: Black Noise; Child Actor; Earl Sweatshirt; Navy Blue; Theravada

Earl Sweatshirt chronology
Voir Dire (2023)	Live Laugh Love (2025)	Pompeii // Utility (2026)

Live Laugh Love is the fifth studio album by the American rapper Earl Sweatshirt. With little prior announcement, it was released on August 22, 2025, through Tan Cressida Records and Warner Records. It follows his collaborative album with the Alchemist, Voir Dire (2023), and his fourth studio album Sick! (2022). Production was primarily handled by Theravada, with additional contributions by Black Noise, Child Actor, Navy Blue, and Earl himself.

== Release and promotion ==
I think it captured both parts of myself: being 16 and then also having a family. The 16-year-old that still is like, [grunts] "live, laugh, love — [expletive] dumbass!" Like, "live laugh, love, the world is [expletive]!" And then my life changing drastically. [...] If someone says "live, laugh, love" and you have kids, you’re like, "Exactly, brother."

— Earl Sweatshirt, interview for The New York Times' Popcast, August 22, 2025

Live Laugh Love was announced at a listening party on August 15, 2025. The event, which Sweatshirt did not himself attend, included live performances from an Earl Sweatshirt imposter and a DJ set by Black Noise that included songs from the album. The album released on all platforms one week later.

A music video for "Crisco" was released on August 28, 2025. A music video for "Exhaust" was released on September 4, 2025. A music video for "Well Done!" was released on September 18, 2025.

== Critical reception ==
Professional ratings
Aggregate scores
Source	Rating
AnyDecentMusic?	7.9/10
Metacritic	84/100
Review scores
Source	Rating
AllMusic	4/5 stars
Clash	8/10
Consequence	B
Exclaim!	9/10
The Guardian	4/5 stars
Paste	8.0/10
Pitchfork	8.5/10
Rolling Stone	4/5 stars
Slant Magazine	4/5 stars
Tom Hull – on the Web	B+

According to the review aggregator Metacritic, Live Laugh Love received "universal acclaim" based on a weighted average score of 84 out of 100 from ten critic scores. Clash called the album "impeccably detailed.. Live Laugh Live' is a rap Escher diagram, a Greek maze with MC as Minotaur; it extends Earl’s world, and invites you forward with every step".

In his review for Exclaim!, Wesley McLean referred to the album as "an undeniable odyssey of personal growth, so incredibly layered and deliberate that not a second feels wasted'" adding that the record is "oozing catharsis, sonically consuming and lyrically poignant". The Guardian said "the disorientating shifts and non-sequiturs feel like observing a dream someone else is having".

== Track listing ==
Credits adapted from Tidal.

No.	Title	Writer(s)	Producer(s)	Length
1.	"GSW vs Sac"	Thebe Kgositsile; Xenophon Yialias	Theravada	1:56
2.	"Forge"	Kgositsile; Yialias	Theravada	1:24
3.	"Infatuation"	Kgositsile; Yialias	Theravada	1:35
4.	"Gamma (Need the <3)"	Kgositsile; Yialias	Theravada	2:01
5.	"Well Done!"	Kgositsile; Sage Elsesser	Navy Blue	1:11
6.	"Live"	Kgositsile; Robert Mansel	Black Noise	3:30
7.	"Static"	Kgositsile; Mansel	Black Noise	1:23
8.	"Crisco"	Kgositsile; Elsesser	Navy Blue	2:39
9.	"Tourmaline"	Kgositsile; Yialias	Theravada	2:54
10.	"Heavy Metal AKA Ejecto Seato!"	Kgositsile; Max Heath	Child Actor	3:07
11.	"Exhaust"	Kgositsile; Elsesser	Earl Sweatshirt; Navy Blue	2:29
Total length:				24:08

== Personnel ==
Credits adapted from Tidal.

- Earl Sweatshirt – lead vocals, mixing, engineering (all tracks); programming (11)
- Mike Bozzi – mastering
- Theravada – programming (1–4, 9)
- The Mandal Man – additional vocals (1)
- Navy Blue – programming (5, 8, 11)
- Black Noise – programming (6, 7)
- Child Actor – programming (10)
- Erykah Badu – additional vocals (11)

== Charts ==
Chart performance for Live Laugh Love
Chart (2025)	Peak position
Australia Hip Hop/R&B Albums (ARIA)	32
Hungarian Physical Albums (MAHASZ)	9
Portuguese Albums (AFP)	156
Scottish Albums (Official Charts)	99
UK Album Downloads (Official Charts)	80
UK Physical Albums (OCC)	100
UK R&B Albums (Official Charts)	9
US Billboard 200	184

== Release history ==
Release formats for Live Laugh Love
Region	Date	Format	Label	Ref.
Various	August 22, 2025	CD; digital download; streaming; vinyl	Tan Cressida; Warner	
