= Veins (album) =

Studio album by Homeboy Sandman
- Released: March 31, 2017
- Genre: Hip-hop
- Length: 24:13
- Label: Stones Throw
- Producer: Kev Brown; 88-Keys; RTNC; Tzarizm; Bpad; Katiah; Alexander Spit; Mainframe; The Audible Doctor

Homeboy Sandman chronology
Kindness for Weakness (2016)	Veins (2017)	Humble Pi (2018)

Veins is the seventh studio album by American rapper Homeboy Sandman. It was released by Stones Throw Records on March 31, 2017. Homeboy Sandman described the inspiration for the album as simply "a burning desire to just fuckin rhyme."

== Critical reception ==
Professional ratings
Review scores
Source	Rating
Robert Christgau	A−
Exclaim!	8/10
HipHopDX	3.5/5

Robert Christgau wrote that if Sandman's "flow and beats were a smidge more iconic, he'd epitomize the kind of major minor artistry Le Tigre--hell, Spoon or somebody--parlayed into legend." In a review for HipHopDX, Kyle Eustice wrote: "In this often vapid world of meaningless lyrics, having to actually dissect what an MC is saying is... like a breath of fresh air." Veins was selected as one of the best hip-hop albums of 2017 by Bandcamp Daily author Phillip Mlynar.

== Track listing ==
No.	Title	Producer(s)	Length
1.	"Between the Clouds"	Kev Brown	2:14
2.	"As Long As You Know"	88-Keys	2:14
3.	"Bamboo"	RTNC	2:04
4.	"Clarity"	Tzarizm	2:45
5.	"Consumption"	Bpad	2:29
6.	"A's, J's & L's"	Mainframe	2:01
7.	"Ceviche with Nietzsche"	Bpad	2:10
8.	"Underground Dreams"	Katiah	2:20
9.	"Lemon Ginger Tea"	Alexander Spit	3:02
10.	"Bless Up"	The Audible Doctor	2:54
Total length:			24:13
