= Black Noise (record producer) =

American record producer

- Born: Robert Mansel; July 30, 1990 (age 36); Shelburne, Nova Scotia, Canada
- Origin: Detroit, Michigan
- Genres: Hip-hop; electronic; experimental
- Occupations: Record producer; songwriter; DJ
- Years active: 2012-present
- Labels: Tan Cressida; Warner
- Member of: Bulletproof Dolphin
- Website: https://www.blackxnoise.com/

Robert Mansel, known professionally as Black Noise (stylized as Black Noi$e), is an American record producer, songwriter, and DJ from Detroit, Michigan. He is best known for his work as a tour DJ for M.I.A. and Earl Sweatshirt as well as producing and writing tracks for other artists such as Armand Hammer, Danny Brown, Fly Anakin, Lucki, MIKE, Pink Siifu, Wiki, and Zelooperz. Black Noise was the first signee of Earl Sweatshirt's imprint label of Warner Records, Tan Cressida, in 2020.

== Early life ==
Black Noise was born in Shelburne, Nova Scotia, Canada on July 30, 1990, and moved to Detroit, Michigan with his family four years later. As a child, he was interested by a wide array of music genres, from punk to techno and hip-hop.

Growing up in the Westland suburbs of Detroit, Black Noise was introduced to the hardcore and grime music of the popular skateboarding culture there. He was influenced by skateboarding videos as well as the soundtracks of the PlayStation video games Thrasher Presents Skate and Destroy and Tony Hawk's Pro Skater. When he was 15, he began playing guitar in various hardcore bands across Detroit and seeing shows by bands like Terror, Death Threat, Bury Your Dead, and Colin of Arabia.

Black Noi$e accredits Detroit's distinct radio culture and skateboarding scene as his biggest source of musical inspiration.

While in high school, a friend introduced Black Noise to the digital audio workstation, Reason, in which he began producing downtempo rap beats, consisting of soul samples and aggressive techno. His early production was heavily inspired by the "raw" style of rap beats frequently used by rappers like The Notorious B.I.G. and E-40, and labels like No Limit Records and Cash Money Records that were popular on Detroit radio stations.

== Career ==
=== 2012–2019: Early career ===
Black Noise began his music career in 2012, being credited as a producer for the track They Don't Understand on American rapper Aaron Cohen's mixtape Murk.

He met Earl Sweatshirt in New York through his friend Remy Banks, who had been on tour with Sweatshirt around 2016.

On October 30, 2017 Black Noise released his first solo EP Time Crisis under Portage Garage Sounds.

He produced the track "The Mint" featuring Navy Blue, that was released on November 20, 2018 as a single for Earl Sweatshirt's third studio album Some Rap Songs that was promptly released ten days later. In the same month, Black Noi$e released his first solo LP Illusions under Vanity Press Records on November 26.

Black Noi$e co-hosted radio show "The Deep End" with SKYWLKR on Red Bull Radio in 2019.

=== 2020–present: Tan Cressida, Oblivion, and Sick! ===
Tan Cressida announced Black Noise's signing to the label on June 19, 2020, with several welcome messages on the label's official Instagram page, as well as Earl Sweatshirt's. As of 2023, he is the only other official artist signed to Tan Cressida. Black Noi$e released his LP project Oblivion on August 14, 2020 under Tan Cressida, making it the first "non-Sweatshirt" title to be released under the label. Oblivion received critical acclaim for its sample-heavy production and prominent feature artists, like Earl Sweatshirt, Danny Brown, MIKE, Pink Siifu, duendita, Liv.e, and Zelooperz.

Black Noise produced and wrote several tracks for Earl Sweatshirt's fourth studio album Sick!, including "2010", "Vision" featuring Zelooperz, "Titanic", and "Fire in the Hole." The track "2010" had previously been released as a single for the album on November 18, 2021 accompanied by a music video. Sick! debuted on January 29, 2022, receiving a Metacritic score of 85/100 from 17 critic reviews, and peaking at #80 on the Billboard 200. As of 2023, "2010" is the most streamed track on Sick! and was labeled one of the "Best New Tracks of 2021" by Pitchfork.

Black Noise hosts a radio show for NTS Radio, where several of his tracks are in rotation. Black Noise was a DJ on Earl Sweatshirt's Voir Dire tour with The Alchemist in 2023.

He released Geometry Of Murder: Extra Capsular Extraction Inversions, a collaborative album with drone band Earth, in January 2026.

== Discography ==
=== Albums ===
- Illusions (2018)
- Oblivion (2020)
- R.I.P. Satana (2024) (with Cousin Mouth)
- Geometry Of Murder: Extra Capsular Extraction Inversions (2026) (with Earth)

=== EPs ===
- Nonbelievers (2014) (with BK Beats)
- Self-titled (2017)
- Time Crisis (2017)
- Soul Golden (2017) (with Navy Blue)
- Partridge (2024) (with Valee)
- EP 1 (2024)

=== Singles ===
- "Natural Technology" (2020)

=== Productions ===
- Aaron Cohen – "They Don't Understand" from Murk (2012)
- Boldy James – "Consignment" from Consignment: Favor For A Favor The Redi-rock Mixtape (2012)
- Children Of The Night – "Intro... Revisited" (2012)
- Deniro Farrar – "Can't Get Sleep" from The Patriarch (2013)
- Peter Rosenberg & Eckō – "'96 Knicks" from Underground Airplay 2: The New York Renaissance (2013)
- World's Fair – "96 Knicks" from Bastards Of The Party (2013)
- Skrapz – "I.C.U." from Way Better than You (2013)
- Lucki – "Finesse II" from X (2015)
- Wiki – "Livin' with My Moms" (featuring Nasty Nigel) from Lil Me (2015)
- King 810 & DJ Drama – Midwest Monsters 2 (2015)
- Zelooperz – "Summit" from Bothic (2016)
- Scumbag Fred – "None Of You" from Imaginary (2016)
- Zelooperz & Shigeto (ZGTO) – "Everlast" from A Piece of the Geto (2017)
- ThaGodFahim – "Samurai's Cup Of Tea" from Dump Gawd (2017)
- DJ Lucas – "Ballerina Look Like Jumpman" from Till Death Do Us Part 1 (2017)
- ThaGodFahim – "Samurai's Cup Of Tea" from Shogunn (2018)
- World's Fair – "Dundas Street" (2018)
- Earl Sweatshirt – "The Mint" (featuring Navy Blue) from Some Rap Songs (2018)
- Dopehead – "Fear" from Beautiful Chaos (2018)
- Detroit Lines – HIT MY DMS (2019)
- Zelooperz – Wild Card (2019)
- Earl Sweatshirt – "Ghost" (featuring Navy Blue) from Feet of Clay (2019)
- Pink Siifu & Fly Anakin – "Blame" from FlySiifu's (2020)
- BbyMutha – "Either Way" from Muthaland (2020)
- Pink Siifu & Fly Anakin – "Blame" from $mokebreak EP (2021)
- J.U.S. – "Brown Noise" from God Goku Jay-Z (2021)
- MF Doom & Jneiro Jarel – "Let's Go (Space Boogie) (Black Noi$e Remix)" (featuring Jawwaad & Shape Of Broad Minds) (2021)
- RXKNephew – "Dark Noise" from Slitherman Activated (2021)
- Earl Sweatshirt – "2010", "Vision", "Titanic" and "Fire in the Hole" from Sick! (2022)
- Zelooperz – "Head 2 the SKy", "SVW", "Toxic Energy" and "Skinny Dip" from Get WeT.Radio (2022)
- Armand Hammer – "Don't Lose Your Job" (featuring Pink Siifu & Moor Mother) from We Buy Diabetic Test Strips (2023)
- Meladettask – "Beeswax" from Business Days (2023)
- Lord Apex – "Back Outside" (featuring Mavi) from The Good Fight (2023)
- Lexa Gates – "Stacy's Chips" from Elite Vessel (2024)
- Earl Sweatshirt – "Well Done!", "Live" and "Static" from Live Laugh Love (2025)
- Kenny Mason – "Door Swangin" from Bulldawg (2026)
- Zelooperz — Pin Breakers (2026)
