= Nowhere2go =

2018 single by American rapper Earl Sweatshirt

Single by Earl Sweatshirt

from the album Some Rap Songs
- Released: November 8, 2018
- Genre: Experimental hip hop; industrial; psychedelic; glitch; lo-fi
- Length: 1:53
- Label: Tan Cressida; Columbia; Sony
- Composers: Thebe Kgositsile; Darryl Anthony Johnson; Adé Hakim Sayyed
- Producers: Darryl Anthony; Adé Hakim

Earl Sweatshirt singles chronology
"Really Doe" (2016)	"Nowhere2go" (2018)	"The Mint" (2018)

"Nowhere2go" is a song by American rapper Earl Sweatshirt and is the first single from his third studio album, Some Rap Songs. It was released on November 8, 2018.

== Critical reception ==
The single received a positive reception. Pitchfork's Sheldon Pearce states "In less than two minutes, he riffs about isolationism and its causes, not liking stuff but having to go outside anyway. But because it’s Earl, there's a sense of solace that comes with all this."

== Charts ==
Chart (2018)	Peak position
New Zealand Hot Singles (RMNZ)	34

== Release history ==
Region	Date	Format	Label	Ref.
Various	November 11, 2018	Digital download	Tan Cressida; Columbia; Sony	
