= Aaron Cohen (rapper) =

American rapper

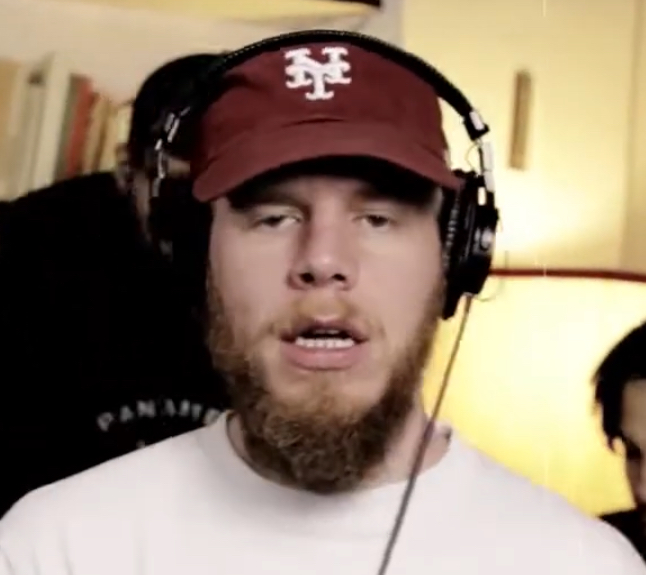
- Cohen in 2019

Background information
- Born: Seattle, Washington, US
- Origin: Queens, New York, U.S.
- Genre: Hip-hop
- Occupation: Rapper
- Years active: 2012–present
- Labels: Mishka; Decon; Mass Appeal; Candy Drips
- Website: www.aaroncohenmusic.com

Aaron Cohen is an American rapper based in Queens, New York. He is a member of the Inner City Kids crew.

== Early life ==
Aaron Cohen is originally from Seattle, Washington. He grew up listening to Nas, Wu-Tang Clan, Eminem, Kanye West, Warren G, The Notorious B.I.G., and Cam'ron.

== Career ==
In 2012, Aaron Cohen released a mixtape, Crack. In that year, he also released a mixtape, Murk, on Mishka. His 2013 mixtape, Potential Fans, was released on Decon and Mass Appeal. It includes contributions from Grande Marshall, Tommy Kruise, and Yuri Beats. Ruby Hornet described it as "a thrashing, complete project that stands to prove why Cohen deserves his own lane in the greater landscape of hip-hop today." In 2013, Complex included him on the "Most Stylish Jewish Rappers of All Time" list. He released the You Wouldn't Know EP in 2014, and the Home Less EP in 2015. In 2016, he released an EP, Off the Ground. Entirely produced by Kemal, it features guest appearances from Abgohard and Mecca Shabazz. His debut studio album, See Red, was released in 2018. In 2019, he released Raw Every Day.

== Discography ==
=== Studio albums ===
- See Red (2018)

=== Mixtapes ===
- Crack (2012)
- Murk (2012)
- Potential Fans (2013)
- Raw Every Day (2019)

=== EPs ===
- You Wouldn't Know (2014)
- Home Less (2015)
- Uglyboyz (2015) (with Abgohard)
- Off the Ground (2016)
