= The Hundreds =

American streetwear brand

- Industry: Clothing manufacturing
- Genre: Streetwear
- Founded: 2003; 23 years ago in Los Angeles, California, U.S.
- Founders: Bobby Kim; Ben Shenassafar
- Headquarters: Los Angeles, California, U.S.
- Number of locations: 4 (2024)
- Area served: Worldwide
- Products: Clothing, footwear and eyewear, print magazine

The Hundreds is a streetwear brand founded in Los Angeles in 2003 by law school classmates Bobby Kim and Ben Shenassafar. The Hundreds also sells a print magazine, footwear and eyewear. In 2011, Complex magazine named The Hundreds as the fifth-greatest streetwear brand.

== Stores ==
In 2007, the brand expanded into retail, opening a store in Los Angeles. The Hundreds followed in 2008 opening San Francisco and in 2010 New York City. On April 1, 2011, The Hundreds opened their fourth retail store, located in Santa Monica, California.

== Design ==
The early creation of The Hundreds designs were inspired by graphic designers from San Diego, Hawaii, and Hong Kong. The Hundreds has partnered with numerous brands.
