= Sage Elsesser =

Italian-American skateboarder, rapper (b. 1997)

Navy Blue
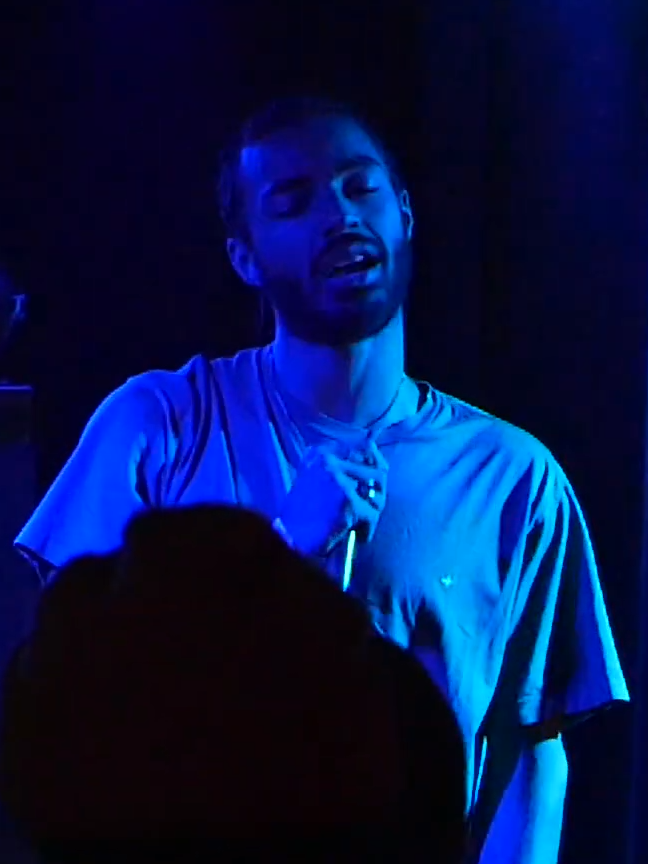
- Elsesser performing in 2021

Background information
- Also known as: Navy Blue; Ancestors
- Born: Sage Gabriel Carlos Atreyu Elsesser; 1996 or 1997 (age 29–30)
- Genres: East Coast hip-hop; alternative hip-hop
- Occupations: Skateboarder; rapper; record producer; songwriter; visual artist; model
- Years active: 2014–present
- Labels: Freedom Sounds; Def Jam (former)
- Sports career
- Country: United States
- Sport: Skateboarding
- Event: Street skateboarding
- Turned pro: 2014 (age 17)

Sage Gabriel Carlos Atreyu Elsesser (born January 31, 1997), also known as Navy Blue, is an American skateboarder, rapper, record producer, visual artist, and model.

Elsesser has been sponsored by several skater fashion brands including Converse and Supreme, as well as becoming a professional skater in 2014 through skater collective and clothing store Fucking Awesome. Aside from skating and music, he is also a model for various clothing brands and an artist, most notably handling the art direction for Earl Sweatshirt's album I Don't Like Shit, I Don't Go Outside in 2015.

== Early life ==
Sage Gabriel Carlos Atreyu Elsesser grew up in Los Angeles, California. He is the brother of models Paloma Elsesser and Ama Elsesser, and TV/film director and producer Kanyessa McMahon.

Elsesser attended a boarding school in East Hampton, New York at age 13.

== Career ==
Elsesser made his professional skateboarding debut in the 2014 William Strobeck short film Cherry for fashion brand Supreme. Following the virality of Cherry, he joined Fucking Awesome, a skate brand formed by Jason Dill and Anthony Van Engelen.

=== 2015–2019: Early years ===
Elsesser began releasing music on SoundCloud under his stage name Navy Blue in 2015. He also began producing music for the likes of Earl Sweatshirt, MIKE, Armand Hammer and Wiki, among others. He released his Gangway for Navy mixtape in February 2019.

=== 2020–2021: Label founding and first three albums ===
On February 4, 2020, he founded independent record label Freedom Sounds with the release of his debut studio album Àdá Irin. Elsesser later followed-up with two studio albums; Song of Sage: Post Panic! (2020), and Navy's Reprise (2021).

=== 2022: Quadrilogy ===
In 2022, Elsesser released a Saga of Sage quadrilogy vinyl boxset which consisted of Song of Sage: Post Panic!, Gift of Gabriel: Rain’s Reign!, Crypt of Carlos: Onward! and Arc of Atreyu: Neverending!, with the latter three being set to only exist in their physical form. The album titles all include one of Elsesser's four names.

=== 2023–24: Signing to Def Jam, Ways of Knowing, and Memoirs in Armour ===
In 2023, Elsesser signed with Def Jam Recordings and released his lead single "Chosen" on March 10. On March 23, Elsesser's seventh studio album Ways of Knowing was released under his label Freedom Sounds, under exclusive license to Def Jam Recordings. The album featured guest appearances from Zeroh, J Rocc, Kelly Moonstone, Liv.e and Venna; and was fully produced by Budgie.

A year later, Navy Blue released his eighth album Memoirs in Armour on August 2. The project was recorded within the last two months prior to release, after being dropped from Def Jam.

=== 2025–present: The Sword & the Soaring and Sir Render ===
In late 2025, Navy Blue released his ninth album, The Sword & the Soaring. The 44-minute album, which features a guest appearance by fellow American rapper Earl Sweatshirt, received universal acclaim for its production, themes, and songwriting. A follow-up album, Sir Render, was released in June 2026.

== Discography ==
=== Studio albums ===
- Àdá Irin (2020)
- Song of Sage: Post Panic! (2020)
- Navy's Reprise (2021)
- Gift of Gabriel: Rain’s Reign! (2022)
- Crypt of Carlos: Onward! (2022)
- Arc of Atreyu: Neverending! (2022)
- Ways of Knowing (2023)
- Memoirs in Armour (2024)
- The Sword & the Soaring (2025)
- Sir Render (2026)

=== Extended plays ===
- According to the Waterbearer (2015)
- Lately (2016)
- April Blue (2017)
- Soul Golden (2017) (with Black Noi$e)
- Guilt & Sincerity (2017)
- Navy in Rage (2017)
- Yvan Wen (2018)
- Forest Green (2018)
- From the Heart... (2018)
- Gangway for Navy (2019)

=== Collaborations ===
- As Above So Below (2021) (with Ankhlejohn)
- True Sky (2021) (with Akai Solo)

=== Singles ===
==== As lead artist ====
List of singles, with year released and album name
Title	Year	Album
"Higher Self"	2019	Non-album single
"Simultaneously Bleeding"	2020	Àdá Irin
"1491"	2020	Song of Sage: Post Panic!
"Durag Anthem"	2021	Non-album single
"Chosen"	2023	Ways of Knowing
"Dolla"	2023	Non-album single
"Low Threshold"	2024	Memoirs In Armour
"Orchards"	2025	The Sword & The Soaring
"Ocean Light (Phase 1: Prelude)"	2026	Sir Render

==== As featured artist ====
List of singles, with year released and album name
Title	Year	Album
"The Mint" (Earl Sweatshirt featuring Navy Blue)	2018	Some Rap Songs
"Clout Dracula" (Mach-Hommy featuring Navy Blue, YoungQueenz & Tvoy)	2019	Non-album single
"North Bridge" (Preservation featuring Navy Blue)	2020	Eastern Medicine, Western Illness
"Can't Do This Alone" (Wiki featuring Navy Blue)	2021	Half God
"Nobles" (The Alchemist featuring Earl Sweatshirt & Navy Blue)	2021	This Thing of Ours
"Make Me Wanna" (Babeheaven featuring Navy Blue)	2022	Sink Into Me
"So Tired You Can't Stop Dreaming" (Quelle Chris featuring Navy Blue)	2022	Deathfame

=== Guest appearances ===
List of non-single guest appearances, with other performing artists, showing year released and album name
Title	Year	Artist(s)	Album
"Silky"	2016	Younger Thug	I Need to Cop a Tesla
"Interviews"	2016	Frank Ocean	Blonde
"Jeez"	2018	Younger Thug	Relax Soundwaves18
"Not Today"	2018	King Carter, MIKE, Adé Hakim	Prisoner of Mind
"Like My Mama"	2018	MIKE	War in My Pen
"Truth"	2019	Judah	Called By Name
"Stranger"	2019	Medhane	Own Pace
"Face"	2020	Ovrkast	Try Again
"Soul at War"	2020	Sideshow	Farley
"TRS"	2020	Medhane	Cold Water
"The Road	2020	Judah	Ten West
"Free All Brothers Locked"	2020	Koncept Jack$on	Thot Rap: Chapter 2
"Ghost"	2020	Earl Sweatshirt	Feet of Clay (Deluxe Edition)
"Clout Dracula (Remix)"	2020	Mach-Hommy, Your Old Droog, Young Queenz	Mach's Hard Lemonade
"Always and Forever"	2020	demahjiae	And, Such Is Life.
"Surrender"	2020	Chuck Strangers	Too Afraid To Dance
"Portrait"	2020	Moor Mother, Billy Woods	Brass
"AllRight"	2021	Fly Anakin	Anakin & Friends: Episode 1
"No Doubt"	2021	AKAI SOLO	True Sky
"Pray With An A"	2021	Evidence	Unlearning, Vol. 1
"no sugar"	2021	Medhane	Do the Math
"Anchor"	2022	Nicholas Craven	Craven N 3
"Give Thanks (For Life) (feat. Navy Blue)"	2022	Six Sev	Give Thanks
"Skeletons"	2022	Domo Genesis	Intros, Outros & Interludes
"Portraits"	2023	Alexander Spit	VIGNETTES VOL. 2
"Venision"	2023	Chuck Strangers	The Boys & Girls
"AAU Tournaments"	2023	Blockhead, Billy Woods	The Aux

== Production discography ==
=== 2017 ===
MIKE -

- "Melvin"

Tha God Fahim - Dump Gawd

- 04. "Samurai's Cup of Tea" (produced with Black Noi$e)

Mach-Hommy - Dump Gawd: Hommy Edition

- 02. "A Partridge & A Pear Tree" (featuring Tha God Fahim)
- 08. "Mac Flurries" (featuring Heem Stogied)
- 11. "Rorshach's" (featuring Tha God Fahim)

MIKE - May God Bless Your Hustle

- 02. "Hunger" (produced with Austin Williamson)
- 03. "Armour"

Navy Blue - Navy in Rage

- 01. "Temple//Tomb"
- 02. "Angel-Eyes" (featuring Qeedar)
- 03. "Sundown"
- 04. "Life----Line"

Mach-Hommy - Fete Des Morts AKA Dia De Los Muertos

- 03. "Embarrassment of Riches"

Cities Aviv -

- "If I Could Hold Your Soul Part II"

=== 2018 ===
Navy Blue - Yvan Wen

- 01 "Head Full of Braids..."
- 02. "No More..."
- 03. "Detroit..." (featuring Nyku)
- 04. "Give Em Hell..."

Navy Blue - Forest Green

- 01. "Eastbound"
- 02. "War(mth)"
- 03. "All We Know!" (featuring Adé Hakim)

Navy Blue - From the Heart...

- 01. "Machete"
- 02. "Enchantment" (featuring MIKE)
- 03. "Never Thought I'd Be One to Cry Like This"
- 04. "Prayer (Me&You)"
- 05. "Give Love a Try!"
- 06. "Loveship (Empathy)"
- 08. "Green & Brown"

Pink Siifu - Ensley

- 11. "Stay Sane"

Earl Sweatshirt - Some Rap Songs

- 08. "The Bends"
- 10. "Azucar"

=== 2019 ===
Navy Blue - Gangway for Navy

- 01. "Apprehension"
- 02. "Deathmask..."
- 03. "Can't Take Me"
- 04. "Shine on Me!" (featuring MIKE)
- 05. "I Love You!"
- 06. "Slow Down"
- 07. "Carlos" (featuring MIKE)
- 08. "Separate Ways!"

MIKE - Tears of Joy

- 20. "Stargazer Pt. 3"

=== 2020 ===
Camden Malik - Spaceship Symphonies

- 04. "Give Me a Call" (featuring Shawn May as "juneayth.")

Armand Hammer - Shrines

- 02. "Solarium"
- 12. "Parables" (featuring Akai Solo)
- 13. "Ramesses II" (featuring Earl Sweatshirt, Moor Mother and Fielded) (produced with Andrew Broder)

Moor Mother & Billy Woods - Brass

- 11. "Guinness"

=== 2021 ===
Wiki - Half God

- 01. "Not Today (Intro)"
- 02. "Roof"
- 03. "Remarkably"
- 04. "Can't Do This Alone" (featuring Navy Blue)
- 05. "Never Fall Off"
- 06. "Drug Supplier" (featuring Jesse James Solomon)
- 07. "Wik tha God"
- 08. "Ego Death"
- 09. "The Business"
- 10. "Home"
- 11. "All I Need" (featuring Earl Sweatshirt)
- 12. "Gas Face" (featuring Remy Banks)
- 13. "The Promised" (featuring MIKE)
- 14. "New Truths"
- 15. "Still Here" (featuring duendita)
- 16. "Grape Soda"

=== 2022 ===
Earl Sweatshirt - Sick!

- 03. "Sick!" (credited as "Ancestors")

Shane Eagle - Green

- 03. "Moving Spirit"
