= Solace (Earl Sweatshirt EP) =

EP by dar Qness
- Released: April 28, 2015
- Recorded: 2014
- Genres: Experimental hip-hop; sampledelia; chillhop; lo-fi; jazz rap; sound collage; poetry
- Length: 10:00
- Label: Tan Cressida
- Producer: Earl Sweatshirt

Dar Qness chronology
I Don't Like Shit, I Don't Go Outside (2015)	Solace (2015)	Some Rap Songs (2018)

Solace (stylized in all lowercase) is the debut extended play by American rapper Earl Sweatshirt, under the name dar Qness. It is exactly 10 minutes long, although it has 6 distinct parts that transition into each other. It was uploaded to his unofficial YouTube channel dar Qness on April 28, 2015. Sweatshirt describes this release as "music from when i hit the bottom and found something".

== Background ==
It is one of two projects released by Earl Sweatshirt in 2015, along with I Don't Like Shit, I Don't Go Outside. Both speak on depression and loss. The two projects are contrasted by their album covers. I Don't Like Shit, I Don't Go Outside has a almost fully black cover, with the exception of the title in the middle, while Solace has a full canvas of light pink.

== Lyrical content ==
Solace is split into 5 parts and is dedicated to Sweatshirt's mother, Cheryl Harris, and his late grandmother. Solace's lyrical themes include drugs, insomnia, depression, losing friends, death, and coping with the loss of his grandmother.

== Critical reception ==
Solace received critical acclaim. Vice's Noisey called it "beautiful", Spin called it "whoozy and complicated". Pitchfork gave it a positive review calling it "a tranquil 10-minute rap suite" that "seeks out a glimmer of hope in the dark" and that "Earl grasps the great distance of loved ones, even when he sees them so close."

== Track listing ==
No.	Title	Writer(s)	Producer	Length
1.	"Solace"	Thebe Kgositsile	Earl Sweatshirt	10:00
Total length:				10:00
