= Ways of Knowing =

Studio album by Navy Blue
- Released: March 23, 2023
- Genre: Hip-hop
- Length: 37:12
- Label: Def Jam
- Producer: Budgie

Navy Blue chronology
Arc of Atreyu: Neverending! (2022)	Ways of Knowing (2023)	Memoirs in Armour (2024)

Singles from Ways of Knowing
- 1. "Chosen" Released: 2023

Ways of Knowing is the seventh studio album by American rapper Sage Elsesser under the pseudonym Navy Blue. It was released on March 23, 2023, through Def Jam Recordings. "Chosen" was released as a single from the album. A music video for the songs "The Medium" and "Pillars" was directed by Devlin Claro.

== Background ==
The album is a collaborative project between rapper Sage Elsesser, who was born in Los Angeles and based in Brooklyn, and producer Budgie, who was born in London and based in Los Angeles. They started making the album in 2019. It took four years to finish the album. The album was recorded at Budgie's home in Los Angeles.

Elsesser stated that the album's title refers to the "ways of knowing that I don't know." He explained, "What I think I know might not be it, and to remain teachable and malleable in the process, there's always going to be a new experience that informs the way I think about everything."

The album's cover art is a photograph of a young Elsesser sitting on his grandfather's lap.

== Critical reception ==
Professional ratings
Review scores
Source	Rating
AllMusic	4/5 stars
Beats Per Minute	85%
HipHopDX	4.3/5
Pitchfork	7.9/10

Yousef Srour of HipHopDX described the album as "a meditation on mindfulness and reconnecting with one's self through the transience of life's ups and downs, maneuvering through grief and depression, love and the labors of vulnerability." Fred Thomas of AllMusic stated, "The lyrics are introspective and metered, returning to themes of family and knowledge passed between generations on almost every track." He added, "Where Navy Blue's sound was once blurry, these 13 songs are clear and ambitious while all consistently of a piece." Matthew Ismael Ruiz of Pitchfork commented that "Budgie's production across Ways of Knowing is elegant and focused, its textures subtle, with flourishes that occupy the periphery, lest they distract from the message."

=== Accolades ===
Year-end lists for Ways of Knowing
Publication	List	Rank	Ref.
BrooklynVegan	25 Best Rap Albums of 2023	24	
Clash	Albums of the Year 2023	39	

== Track listing ==
Ways of Knowing track listing
No.	Title	Length
1.	"The Medium"	2:15
2.	"Chosen"	2:14
3.	"The One"	2:28
4.	"To Fall in Love" (featuring Budgie)	2:56
5.	"Life's Terms" (featuring Zeroh)	3:42
6.	"Phases"	1:15
7.	"Kill Switch" (featuring J. Rocc)	3:21
8.	"Window to the Soul" (featuring Kelly Moonstone)	4:03
9.	"Freehold"	2:53
10.	"Embers" (featuring Liv.e and Venna)	2:11
11.	"Pillars"	3:19
12.	"Look in My Eyes"	3:03
13.	"Shadow's Shield"	3:32
Total length:		37:12
