= Sick! =

Studio album by Earl Sweatshirt
- Released: January 14, 2022
- Recorded: 2020–2021
- Genres: Alternative hip-hop; psychedelic hip-hop; cloud rap; jazz rap; drumless
- Length: 24:00
- Labels: Tan Cressida; Warner
- Producers: The Alchemist; Alexander Spit; Black Noise; Navy Blue; Rob Chambers; Samiyam; Thebe Kgositsile; Theravada

Earl Sweatshirt chronology
| Feet of Clay (2019) | Sick! (2022) | Voir Dire (2023) |

Singles from Sick!
- 1. "2010" Released: November 19, 2021; 2. "Tabula Rasa" Released: December 10, 2021; 3. "Titanic" Released: January 7, 2022

Sick! (stylized in all caps) is the fourth studio album by American rapper Earl Sweatshirt. It was released on January 14, 2022, through Tan Cressida and Warner Records. The album features collaborations with Armand Hammer and Zelooperz, along with additional vocals by Na-Kel Smith. Production was handled by the Alchemist, Black Noise, Navy Blue (under the alias Ancestors), Samiyam, Alexander Spit, Theravada, Rob Chambers, and some co-production by Earl himself. It was preceded by the singles "2010", "Tabula Rasa" featuring Armand Hammer, and "Titanic".

== Background ==
Earl Sweatshirt called the album his "humble offering of 10 songs recorded in the wake of the worldwide coronavirus pandemic and its subsequent lockdowns", as he "leaned into the chaos" of the world's growing "anger and restlessness". The album was announced on December 10, 2021.

== Cover art ==
The album cover depicts a framed mold of Earl Sweatshirt wearing a mask surrounded by two pills, African photos, a clove of garlic, and some sage.

== Critical reception ==
Professional ratings
Aggregate scores
| Source | Rating |
|---|---|
| AnyDecentMusic? | 7.9/10 |
| Metacritic | 85/100 |
Review scores
| Source | Rating |
| AllMusic | 4/5 stars |
| The Arts Desk | 5/5 stars |
| Beats per Minute | 86% |
| Clash | 9/10 |
| NME | 4/5 stars |
| The Observer | 4/5 stars |
| Paste | 8.2/10 |
| Pitchfork | 8.1/10 |
| Rolling Stone | 4/5 stars |
| Slant Magazine | 3.5/5 stars |

Sick was met with widespread critical acclaim from critics upon its release. At Metacritic, which assigns a normalized rating out of 100 to reviews from mainstream publications, the album received an average score of 85, based on 17 reviews. Aggregator AnyDecentMusic? gave it 7.9 out of 10, based on their assessment of the critical consensus.

Tom Breihan of Stereogum named Sick! "Album of the Week", stating, "SICK! is the first Earl Sweatshirt album that doesn't sound more freaked-out and withdrawn than the one that came before. It's a dense, rich, contemplative piece of work... [it's] a strange and insular rap record, but it's a rap record nonetheless, and it's a great one". Concluding the review for AllMusic, Fred Thomas felt that while " Sick! is brief, with just ten songs clocking in at around 24 minutes, but every move is placed with intention and forethought. Sharp, direct, and fluid in a way that's almost supernatural, Sick! perfectly conveys the duality of frustration and drive to persevere that arises from living through exceptionally difficult times." Reviewing the album for Pitchfork, Dylan Green compared the album to its predecessor; "Sick! doesn't recontextualize the genre in the same way Some Rap Songs did, but it's an act of self-revolution. It magnifies a newly assured Earl Sweatshirt, skin shed and free to ascend."

== Track listing ==
Sick! track listing
| No. | Title | Writer(s) | Producer(s) | Length |
|---|---|---|---|---|
| 1. | "Old Friend" | Thebe Kgositsile; Daniel Alan Maman | The Alchemist | 1:19 |
| 2. | "2010" | Kgositsile; Robert Mansel | Black Noise | 2:28 |
| 3. | "Sick!" | Kgositsile; Sage Elsesser | Ancestors; Kgositsile^{[a]} | 1:51 |
| 4. | "Vision" (featuring Zelooperz) | Kgositsile; Walter Williams; Mansel | Black Noise; The Alchemist^{[a]} | 4:14 |
| 5. | "Tabula Rasa" (featuring Armand Hammer) | Kgositsile; Elucid; Billy Woods; Xenophon Yialias; Thaniil Theoharis | Theravada; Rob Chambers; Kgositsile^{[a]} | 4:11 |
| 6. | "Lye" | Kgositsile; Maman | The Alchemist | 1:52 |
| 7. | "Lobby" (interlude) | Kgositsile; Sam Baker | Samiyam | 1:12 |
| 8. | "God Laughs" | Kgositsile; Alexander Manzano | Alexander Spit; Kgositsile^{[a]} | 1:24 |
| 9. | "Titanic" | Kgositsile; Mansel | Black Noise | 1:52 |
| 10. | "Fire in the Hole" | Kgositsile; Mansel | Black Noise | 3:37 |
| Total length: | | | | 24:00 |

Notes

- ^{^[a]} signifies a recording engineer.
- "Titanic" features additional vocals by Na-Kel Smith.

== Charts ==
Chart performance for Sick!
| Chart (2022) | Peak position |
|---|---|
| Australian Albums (ARIA) | 56 |
| Belgian Albums (Ultratop Flanders) | 133 |
| Canadian Albums (Billboard) | 82 |
| Lithuanian Albums (AGATA) | 86 |
| New Zealand Albums (RMNZ) | 38 |
| UK R&B Albums (Official Charts) | 23 |
| US Billboard 200 | 80 |
| US Top R&B/Hip-Hop Albums (Billboard) | 45 |
