= Zelooperz =

American rapper (born 1993)

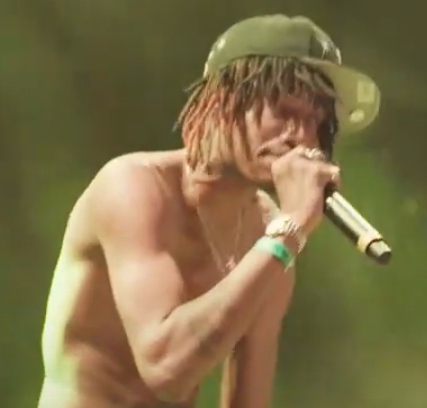
- Zelooperz performing in 2022

Background information
- Born: Walter Moszel Williams; June 18, 1993 (age 33)
- Origin: Detroit, Michigan, U.S.
- Genre: Hip hop
- Occupations: Rapper; songwriter
- Years active: 2010–present
- Label: Tan Cressida
- Member of: Bruiser Brigade
- Website: zelooperz.bandcamp.com

Walter Moszel Williams (born June 18, 1993), known as Zelooperz (stylized as ZelooperZ), is an American rapper. He is a member of Detroit-based hip hop group Bruiser Brigade and is signed to their record label Bruiser Brigade Records.

== Career ==
He released two LPs in 2019, Wild Card and Dyn-o-Mite, and in 2020, he released three: Gremlin, Moszel Offline, and Valley of Life. In 2021, he followed up with the album Van Gogh's Left Ear.

Zelooperz released the album Dali Aint Dead in September 2025. The album features appearances from Zack Fox and Paris Texas.

Alongside his career as a rapper, Williams is a painter. He has described his painting style as being influenced by Francis Bacon and Hajime Sorayama. Several of Williams’ album covers are painted by Williams himself, such as the cover of Van Gogh’s Left Ear, which is a self-portrait.

Williams has sold paintings under his stage name Zelooperz as well as the moniker Moszel Offline (not to be confused with the 2020 album of the same name).

== Discography ==
=== Studio albums ===
- Bothic (2016)
- A Piece of the Geto (with Shigeto) (2017)
- Wild Card (2019)
- Dyn-o-mite (2019)
- Gremlin (2020)
- Moszel Offline (2020)
- Valley of Life (2020)
- Van Gogh's Left Ear (2021)
- Get WeT.Radio (2022)
- Microphone Fiend (2023)
- Quazel (with Quadie Diesel) (2023)
- Dear Psilocybin (with Real Bad Man) (2025)
- Dali Aint Dead (2025)
- Pin Breakers (2026)

=== Mixtapes ===
- Coon N The Room: Eating Ramen Noodles While Watching Roots on Bootleg (2011)
- Help (2014)

=== Guest appearances ===
List of non-single guest appearances, with other performing artists, showing year released and album name
Title	Year	Artist(s)	Album
"Kush Coma"	2013	Danny Brown, A$AP Rocky	Old
"Titties"	2013	TRPL BLK	Big Dick Niggas Eat Pussy Too
"Balls Deep"	2013	TRPL BLK, Chavis Chandler, Steve Perry	Big Dick Niggas Eat Pussy Too
"Weak Bitch"	2013	Dopehead	Devil's Heaven
"Z Day"	2014	Black Noi$e, BK Beats	Nonbelievers
"Bonnie & Clyde"	2020	Black Noi$e	OBLIVION
"Henny and Apple Cider"	2021	Na-Kel Smith	A Dream No Longer Deferred
"Zenak"	2021	Na-Kel Smith	A Dream No Longer Deferred
"SS San Francisco"	2021	Injury Reserve	By The Time I Get to Phoenix
"Wildstyle"	2021	The Alchemist	This Thing of Ours 2
"Vision"	2022	Earl Sweatshirt	Sick!
"Antidote"	2024	Logic	Ultra 85
"Big Wigs"	2024	Boldy James, whothehelliscarlo	Hidden in Plain Sight
"2 Bad"	2024	Bruiser Wolf, Danny Brown	My Story Got Stories
