= Feet of Clay (EP) =

EP by Earl Sweatshirt
- Released: November 1, 2019
- Recorded: 2019
- Genres: Alternative hip-hop; avant-jazz; lo-fi; psychedelia
- Length: 15:22 (standard); 20:38 (deluxe)
- Labels: Tan Cressida; Warner
- Producers: The Alchemist; Black Noi$e; Earl Sweatshirt; Mach-Hommy; ovrkast.

Earl Sweatshirt chronology
Some Rap Songs (2018)	Feet of Clay (2019)	Sick! (2022)

Deluxe edition cover

Singles from Feet of Clay
- 1. "East" Released: November 1, 2019; 2. "Whole World" Released: April 24, 2020

Feet of Clay (stylized in all caps) is the second extended play by American rapper Earl Sweatshirt. It was released on November 1, 2019, through Tan Cressida and Warner Records. A deluxe edition, also included on the vinyl and CD copies, was released digitally July 24, 2020, including two bonus tracks.

== Background ==
The extended play was as a surprise release, announced the day before its release. A music video for "East" was released alongside the EP. On April 24, 2020 "Whole World" was released as a single for the deluxe version of the EP. The deluxe version of the EP released on July 24, 2020.

== Critical reception ==
Professional ratings
Aggregate scores
Source	Rating
AnyDecentMusic?	7.3/10
Metacritic	79/100
Review scores
Source	Rating
AllMusic	4/5 stars
Clash	7/10
Consequence of Sound	B
HipHopDX	3.8/5
The Line of Best Fit	8/10
NME	4/5 stars
Pitchfork	8.4/10
Rolling Stone	4/5 stars
Sputnikmusic	3.8/5

According to the review aggregator Metacritic, Feet of Clay received "generally favorable reviews" based on a weighted average score of 79 out of 100 from 12 critic scores. Aggregator AnyDecentMusic? gave Feet of Clay 7.3 out of 10, based on their assessment of the critical consensus.

The EP received praise for its lyricism. Writing for Rolling Stone, Danny Schwartz states that Earl's "dense words-per-second ratio, as well as the fluid, associative logic that guides Feet of Clay, makes each song appear as a bottled capsule of unfiltered stream-of-consciousness that spills out of him like water from an Artesian well." AllMusic's Fred Thomas praised its themes, stating that the "tracks represent different, curious branches extending out from the seeds planted by Some Rap Songs, each reaching for new ideas and switching gears when another thought arrives".

The album's production received more mixed reception. Dan Weiss of Consequence described Feet of Clay as a "maze of compellingly crudded-up soundwork" and stated that Earl's "double-encrypted flow is as impenetrable as it's ever been." Dhruva Balram of NME stated that "the production on the project, mainly overseen by Earl – with support from Cali producer The Alchemist – ranges from dark, haunted tunes to lo-fi production that's rough around the edges". HipHopDX's Kevin Cortez concluded that "the EP is yet another polarizing entry in Earl's canon, directly challenging listeners with grating production without ever begging anyone to listen. As abrasive as it feels, it's a lyrically rewarding payoff for listeners who choose to sift through the muddle and explore a high-brow exercise into poetry".

== Track listing ==
No.	Title	Writer(s)	Producer(s)	Length
1.	"74"	Thebe Kgositsile	Kgositsile	1:41
2.	"East"	Kgositsile	Kgositsile	1:58
3.	"Mtomb" (featuring Liv.e)	Kgositsile; Daniel Alan Maman; James Mtume; Reggie Lucas	The Alchemist	1:10
4.	"OD"	Kgositsile	Kgositsile	1:35
5.	"El Toro Combo Meal" (featuring Mavi)	Kgositsile; Omavi Minder; Silas Wilson	ovrkast.	2:31
6.	"Tisk Tisk / Cookies"	Kgositsile	Kgositsile	1:40
7.	"4N" (featuring Mach-Hommy)	Kgositsile; Mach-Hommy; Michael Henderson; Ray Parker Jr.	Kgositsile; Mach-Hommy	4:47
Total length:				15:22

Deluxe edition bonus tracks
No.	Title	Writer(s)	Producer	Length
8.	"Ghost" (featuring Navy Blue)	Kgositsile; Sage Elsesser; Robert Mansel; Paul Smith	Black Noi$e	1:49
9.	"Whole World" (featuring Maxo)	Kgositsile; Maxamilian Allen; Maman; Charly García	The Alchemist	3:27
Total length:				20:38

Notes

- All track titles are stylized in all caps.

== Personnel ==
- Earl Sweatshirt – vocals, programming (tracks 1, 2, 4, 6, 7), engineering, mixing
- Liv.e – featured background vocals (track 3)
- Mavi – featured vocals (track 5)
- Mach-Hommy – featured vocals (track 7), programming (track 7)
- Maxo – featured vocals (track 9)
- Navy Blue – featured vocals (track 8)
- The Alchemist – programming (track 3, 9)
- ovrkast. – programming (track 5)
- Black Noi$e – programming (track 8)
- Swarvy – additional programming (track 3)
- Joe Visciano – mixing
- Chris Athens – mastering

== Charts ==
Chart (2019)	Peak position
US Billboard 200	102
