= I Don't Like Shit, I Don't Go Outside =

Studio album by Earl Sweatshirt
- Released: March 23, 2015
- Genre: Hip-hop
- Length: 29:56
- Label: Tan Cressida; Columbia
- Producer: Earl Sweatshirt; Left Brain

Earl Sweatshirt chronology
Doris (2013)	I Don't Like Shit, I Don't Go Outside (2015)	Solace (2015)

Vinyl cover

Singles from I Don't Like Shit, I Don't Go Outside
- 1. "Grief" Released: March 17, 2015

I Don't Like Shit, I Don't Go Outside: An Album by Earl Sweatshirt (also referred to simply as I Don't Like Shit, I Don't Go Outside) is the second studio album by American rapper Earl Sweatshirt. It was released on March 23, 2015, by Tan Cressida Records and Columbia Records. It has guest appearances by Dash, Wiki, Na-Kel and Vince Staples.

The album received widespread acclaim from critics. It debuted at number 12 on the US Billboard 200, selling 30,000 copies in the first week.

== Release and promotion ==
On March 17, 2015, the album pre-order appeared on the iTunes Store without prior announcement, in part due to an error by Sony Music Entertainment. The album's lead single, "Grief", was released on March 17, 2015, with an accompanying music video. The full album was digitally released on March 23, 2015, and the physical version was released on April 14, 2015. On August 7, 2015, Sweatshirt released an animated music video for the song "Off Top".

== Critical reception ==
Professional ratings
Aggregate scores
Source	Rating
AnyDecentMusic?	7.6/10
Metacritic	81/100
Review scores
Source	Rating
AllMusic	4/5 stars
The A.V. Club	B+
The Guardian	4/5 stars
Los Angeles Times	3/4 stars
Mojo	4/5 stars
NME	6/10
Pitchfork	8.0/10
Rolling Stone	3.5/5 stars
Spin	8/10
XXL	4/5

I Don't Like Shit, I Don't Go Outside was met with widespread critical acclaim. At Metacritic, which assigns a normalized rating out of 100 to reviews from mainstream publications, the album received an average score of 81, based on 31 reviews. The aggregator AnyDecentMusic? gave it 7.6 out of 10, based on its assessment of the critical consensus.

David Jeffries of AllMusic said, "I Don't Like Shit is heavy and lacks much hope, and yet it communicates these feelings with such skill and artful understanding that it still fills the soul." Randall Roberts of the Los Angeles Times said, "Within these sparse, Rothko-esque works the artist dedicates deep, unflinching energy to documenting and hopefully exorcising his woes (or at least understanding them), delivering lines with wondrous cadence, zipping with a sing-song musicality that illuminates what surrounds it." Winston Cook-Wilson of Pitchfork said, "Earl is carefully whittling away at the proclivities he's always had, remaining confident that he'll light upon something that feels fresh and honest. So far, he's right."

In a positive review for Exclaim!, Erin Lowers praised Earl's "raw and honest" look at both sides of success. Tshepo Mokoena of The Guardian said, "The album staggers by quickly, making it easy to miss a lacerating line here or clever double entendre there. In that respect, it lends itself well to multiple listens." Eric Diep of HipHopDX said, "His self-expression is supported by an album mostly produced by him (a.k.a. randomblackdude) and Left Brain, where the entire production is minimal, dark and contains rare interludes. It's the glue that holds all his confessions and retrospective bars together." Devon Fisher of PopMatters said, "There's usually only so much of the Odd Future aesthetic one can take before the darkness becomes overwhelming, and so a sub-40-minute runtime is perfect. Never in any danger of overstaying his welcome, Kgositsile shows an overall maturity on Outside that suggests great things in his future." Jon Dolan of Rolling Stone said, "It's amazing that music so claustrophobic can be this engrossing."

Evan Rytlewski of The A.V. Club said, "At just under a half-hour, it's even more understated than its predecessor, with fewer guests, almost no outside producers, less variety—less everything, really. That may sound like a downgrade, but it's not, since here the anti-spectacle becomes a kind of spectacle of its own, as Earl tests how far his music can retreat into itself." Rachel Chesbrough of XXL said, "Nothing is forced in his rhymes; his lyricism is so dense and acrobatic that his freestyle vibe is all the more impressive." Ernest Wilkins of Complex said, "Self-produced almost entirely under the moniker randomblackdude, I Don't Go Outside is a minefield of gloomy thumpers. Nothing stands out to the point of distinction sonically, but that might be the point." Louis Pattison of NME said, "The little dude is a poet. Still, at a relatively lean 30 minutes, it's hard to argue this is a heavyweight album."

=== Year-end lists ===
Select year-end rankings of I Don't Like Shit, I Don't Go Outside
Publication	List	Rank	Ref.
Complex	The Best Albums of 2015	18	
Pitchfork	The Best Albums of 2015	25	
Rolling Stone	40 Best Rap Albums of 2015	8	
Spin	The 50 Best Albums of 2015	27	
Vice	The 50 Best Albums of 2015	14	

== Commercial performance ==
I Don't Like Shit, I Don't Go Outside debuted at number 12 on the US Billboard 200, selling 30,000 copies. It was the seventh highest selling album in the United States that week.

== Track listing ==
All tracks produced by Earl Sweatshirt (credited as "randomblackdude"), except "Off Top", produced by Left Brain.

I Don't Like Shit, I Don't Go Outside track listing
No.	Title	Writer(s)	Length
1.	"Huey"	Thebe Kgositsile	1:52
2.	"Mantra"	Kgositsile	3:48
3.	"Faucet"	Kgositsile	3:07
4.	"Grief"	Kgositsile; Christopher Wallace; Osten Harvey; Burt Bacharach; Erica Wright; Hal David; Garry Glenn; Karriem Riggins; Gary Wilson	4:10
5.	"Off Top"	Kgositsile; Vyron Turner	1:46
6.	"Grown Ups" (featuring Dash)	Kgositsile; Darien Dash	2:57
7.	"AM // Radio" (featuring Wiki)	Kgositsile; Patrick Morales	4:02
8.	"Inside"	Kgositsile	1:49
9.	"DNA" (featuring Na-Kel)	Kgositsile; Na-Kel Allah Smith	3:52
10.	"Wool" (featuring Vince Staples)	Kgositsile; Vince Staples	2:33
Total length:			29:56

Notes

- "Huey" features additional vocals by Paloma Elsesser

Samples credits

- "Grief" contains samples from "Fall in Love (Your Funeral)", written by Christopher Wallace, Osten Harvey, Burt Bacharach, Erica Wright, Hal David, Garry Glenn and Karriem Riggins, and performed by Erykah Badu; and "You Were Too Good to Be True", written and performed by Gary Wilson.

== Charts ==
=== Weekly charts ===
Chart performance for I Don't Like Shit, I Don't Go Outside
Chart (2015)	Peak position
Australian Albums (ARIA)	33
Belgian Albums (Ultratop Flanders)	150
New Zealand Albums (RMNZ)	26
US Billboard 200	12
US Top R&B/Hip-Hop Albums (Billboard)	4

=== Year-end charts ===
Year-end chart performance for I Don't Like Shit, I Don't Go Outside
Chart (2015)	Position
US Top R&B/Hip-Hop Albums (Billboard)	75
