= Some Rap Songs =

Studio album by Earl Sweatshirt
- Released: November 30, 2018
- Recorded: December 24, 2016 – 2018
- Studio: Home (Los Angeles)
- Genre: Hip-hop
- Length: 24:47
- Labels: Tan Cressida; Columbia
- Producers: Adé Hakim; Black Noise; Darryl Anthony; Denmark; Sage Elsesser; Shamel of SOTC; Thebe Kgositsile

Earl Sweatshirt chronology
Solace (2015)	Some Rap Songs (2018)	Feet of Clay (2019)

Singles from Some Rap Songs
- 1. "Nowhere2go" Released: November 8, 2018; 2. "The Mint" Released: November 20, 2018

Some Rap Songs is the third studio album by American rapper Earl Sweatshirt. It was released on November 30, 2018, through Tan Cressida Records and distributed by Columbia Records.

The album features guest contributions from Navy Blue, Standing on the Corner, as well as vocal samples of Earl's mother Cheryl Harris, Earl's father Keorapetse Kgositsile who is credited posthumously, and an instrumental sample of Hugh Masekela, who is also credited posthumously. It features prominent production from Sweatshirt himself, with further contributions by Darryl Anthony, Adé Hakim, Denmark, Black Noise, Sage Elsesser and Shamel of SOTC.

== Cover art ==
The cover of Some Rap Songs is a shaky, blurry selfie of Earl smiling, (Note: Though Israel Daramola of Spin refers to the cover art as "a shaky photograph of an unknown smiling person blurred beyond any easy identification", the staff of Atwood Magazine identify the individual as Earl Sweatshirt, and DJBooth's Dylan Green identifies the photograph as a selfie.) "blurred beyond any easy identification". The facial features shown in the photograph have been noted: the staff of Atwood Magazine wrote that "The photo's details are still vaguely discernible, namely Earl's blurry face and floating, penetrating eyes", and Dylan Green of DJBooth highlighted the "teeth stacked together in a terrifying smile below glaring eyes."

Several commentators have compared the album's blurry cover photograph with the music itself. Israel Daramola of Spin called it "an apt visual metaphor for the music itself, both in the image of a spark of life amidst chaos, and in the sense that the creative process of taking the photo may have been ruptured as it was happening." Atwood Magazine stated that the album "sounds how this picture looks—unpredictable yet calculated, blurry and distorted yet well-defined". Green wrote of the album's tracks that "The bars and the beats clash in a way befitting" of the cover photograph, and The A.V. Club's Clayton Purdom wrote that "That blurry cover and demurring title are no feint; [Earl is] buried in the mix, his voice fighting against crashing waves of old jazz samples and the cut-up shades of long-gone voices."

== Release and promotion ==
Some Rap Songs was released on November 30, 2018. On January 30, 2019, Earl uploaded an eight-minute short film titled Nowhere, Nobody in promotion of the album, featuring different songs from the album throughout the video.

=== Singles ===
The album's lead single, "Nowhere2go", was released on November 8, 2018. The album's second single, "The Mint" featuring Navy Blue, was released on November 20, 2018.

== Critical reception ==
Professional ratings
Aggregate scores
Source	Rating
AnyDecentMusic?	8.0/10
Metacritic	86/100
Review scores
Source	Rating
AllMusic	4.5/5 stars
The A.V. Club	A
Consequence	B−
Financial Times	4/5 stars
The Guardian	5/5 stars
Mojo	4/5 stars
NME	4/5 stars
Pitchfork	8.8/10
Rolling Stone	4/5 stars
XXL	4/5

Some Rap Songs was met with widespread critical acclaim. At Metacritic, which assigns a normalized rating out of 100 to reviews from mainstream publications, the album received an average score of 86, based on 19 reviews. Aggregator AnyDecentMusic? gave it 8.0 out of 10, based on their assessment of the critical consensus.

Reviewing the album for The A.V. Club, Clayton Purdom stated: "Well, it can be [dour]. But it's also ecstatic. Make no mistake: This is an album by one of the best rappers alive, elbowing slant rhymes and assonance into his disses ("Please do aboard, I could feel when you're forcin' it / Still in a bore riddim") and exhaling those singularly oblong sentences of his ("Galaxy's the distance between us by Christmas," he describes one floundering relationship)." Fred Thomas of AllMusic wrote: "Simultaneously sad, strange, and warmly nostalgic, Some Rap Songs is excitingly listenable and emotionally connected despite its abstruse approach. The album's triumphs are in its fearless risk taking and the insight it allows into the journey of Earl Sweatshirt's constant creative regeneration". Pitchfork's Timmhotep Aku said, "The project is distinctly rough around the edges, to great effect; there's the sound of dust popping off vinyl and cassette hiss throughout. ... His uncle and father are gone, but Earl is still here, carrying on their artistic legacy—and, with the help of his collaborators, building his own".

Sputnikmusic wrote, "Every loop [of "Nowhere2go"] reveals another layer to the undulating beat, but for the first time thus far it's Earl taking the spotlight, rising above the track with a tired yet hopeful rap that's so melodic he's nearly singing. And in case you were worried the boy wouldn't spit, it's followed quickly by "December 24", a song dating back years under the name "Bad Acid" which provides the strongest link to the more aggressive and conventional early 2010s Earl". Daniel Spielberger of HipHopDX praised the album saying, "Some Rap Songs is reminiscent to Earl's late friend Mac Miller's final album Swimming. Both bring the listener through the process of overcoming trauma and healing but ultimately, choose to leave the story unfinished". XXL critic Chris Gibbons said, "Some Rap Songs packs a lot in 25 minutes, making for an unsettling listen that is also one of the most personal, gripping rap records of the year".

Charles Holmes of Rolling Stone stated, "Some Rap Songs is the rare album by an immensely talented lyricist who deigns not to pull out any fireworks, opting to sink into the cushion's of a therapist's couch in the search for an honest work of art. It's a delicate statement of restraint, and in this case the process shows more of the artist than ever before". NME's Sam Moore enjoyed the album, saying, "Some Rap Songs may be a brief exercise, but its ambition and the—largely successful—execution of its ideas demonstrate that the enigmatic Earl is as fascinating as ever". M. T. Richards of Exclaim! said, "Although a very strong record for what it is, Some Rap Songs lacks the emotional power of the two albums that preceded it, particularly Doris, which charted Earl's transition back to civilian life from a Samoan wilderness camp".

=== Rankings ===
Select rankings of Some Rap Songs
Publication	List	Rank	Ref.
The A.V. Club	The A.V. Club's 20 Best Albums of 2018	8	
Complex	50 Best Albums of 2018	49	
Fact	The 50 Best Albums of 2018	15	
NME	Best Albums of the Year 2018	59	
Noisey	Noisey's 100 Best Albums of 2018	58	
Pitchfork	The 50 Best Albums of 2018	7	
Pitchfork	The 200 Best Albums of the 2010s	27	
Rolling Stone	The 200 Greatest Hip-Hop Albums of All Time	80	
Spin	51 Best Albums of 2018	6	
Stereogum	The Best Albums of 2018	35	
Uproxx	The 50 Best Albums of 2018	10	

== Track listing ==
Some Rap Songs track listing
No.	Title	Writer(s)	Producer(s)	Length
1.	"Shattered Dreams"	Thebe Kgositsile; John Thomas Jr.^{[a]}	Kgositsile	2:21
2.	"Red Water"	Kgositsile	Kgositsile	1:44
3.	"Cold Summers"	Kgositsile; Willy N'For^{[b]}; Emmanuel Baloka^{[b]}; Jimmy Stormy^{[b]}	Kgositsile	1:06
4.	"Nowhere2go"	Kgositsile; Darryl Joseph; Adé Hakim Sayyed	Adé Hakim; Joseph	1:53
5.	"December 24"	Kgositsile; Denmark Vessey	Denmark	1:46
6.	"Ontheway!" (featuring Standing on the Corner)	Kgositsile; Giovanni Cortez; Sherman Willis^{[c]}	Kgositsile	1:41
7.	"The Mint" (featuring Navy Blue)	Kgositsile; Sage Elsesser; Robert Mansel	Black Noise	2:45
8.	"The Bends"	Kgositsile; Elsesser; Lowrell Simon^{[d]}; Richard Tufo^{[d]}	Elsesser	1:34
9.	"Loosie"	Kgositsile	Kgositsile	0:59
10.	"Azucar"	Kgositsile; Elsesser; Donald Davis^{[e]}; Harvey Scales^{[e]}; Albert Vance^{[e]}	Elsesser	1:25
11.	"Eclipse"	Kgositsile	Kgositsile	1:33
12.	"Veins"	Kgositsile; Curtis Mayfield^{[f]}	Kgositsile	1:59
13.	"Playing Possum" (featuring Cheryl Harris and Keorapetse Kgositsile)	Kgositsile	Kgositsile	1:34
14.	"Peanut"	Kgositsile	Kgositsile	1:13
15.	"Riot!" (instrumental)	Kgositsile; Cortez; Hugh Masekela^{[g]}	Kgositsile; Shamel of SOTC	1:06
Total length:				24:47

Sample credits

- ^{^[a]} "Shattered Dreams" contains samples from "Shattered Dreams" as performed by The Endeavors and written by John Thomas Jr.
- ^{^[b]} "Cold Summers" contains a sample of "Road Man (Mystic)" as performed by Mighty Flames and written by Willy N'For, Emmanuel Baloka and Jimmy Stormy.
- ^{^[c]} "Ontheway!" contains samples from "Trust in Me Baby" as performed by Soul Superiors and written by Sherman Willis.
- "The Mint" contains samples from the film Black Dynamite and from "Rococo Rondo" as written and performed by The Ghostwriters.
- ^{^[d]} "The Bends" contains a sample from "After Loving You" as performed by Linda Clifford and written by Lowrell Simon and Richard Tufo.
- ^{^[e]} "Azucar" contains a sample from "I'm Just a Shoulder to Cry On" as performed by The Soul Children and written by Donald Davis, Harvey Scales and Albert Vance.
- ^{^[f]} "Veins" contains a sample from "I Made a Mistake" as performed by Billy Jones and written by Curtis Mayfield.
- "Playing Possum" contains vocal samples from "UCLA Law Keynote" as spoken by Cheryl Harris, and an excerpt of "Anguish Longer Than Sorrow", a poem written and spoken by Keorapetse Kgositsile.
- ^{^[g]} "Riot!" contains a sample from "Riot" as performed and written by Hugh Masekela.

== Personnel ==
Credits were adapted from the album's liner notes.

- Thebe Kgositsile – engineering, mixing, vocals
- Shamel of SOTC – mixing engineering, bass guitar on "Ontheway!" and “Riot!”
- Mike Bozzi – mastering engineering

== Charts ==
Chart performance for Some Rap Songs
Chart (2018)	Peak position
Australian Albums (ARIA)	40
Belgian Albums (Ultratop Flanders)	90
Canadian Albums (Billboard)	31
Dutch Albums (Album Top 100)	69
Irish Albums (IRMA)	53
New Zealand Albums (RMNZ)	35
UK Albums (Official Charts)	75
UK R&B Albums (Official Charts)	16
US Billboard 200	17
US Top R&B/Hip-Hop Albums (Billboard)	10

== Release history ==
Release dates and formats for Some Rap Songs
Region	Date	Format(s)	Label(s)	Ref.
Various	November 30, 2018	Digital download; streaming; CD; tape; vinyl	Tan Cressida; Columbia	
