= Earl Sweatshirt =

American rapper (born 1994)

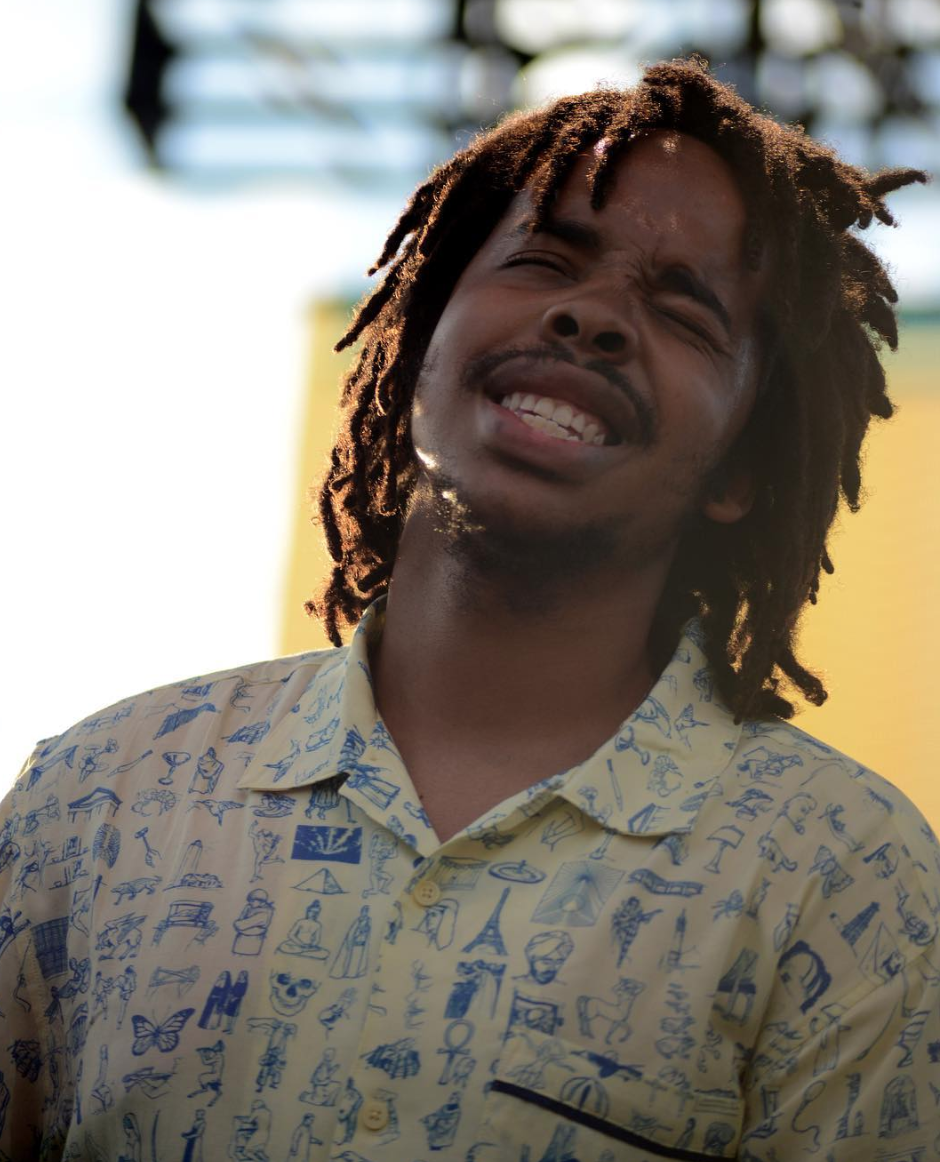
- Earl Sweatshirt performing in 2017
- Born: Thebe Neruda Kgositsile; February 24, 1994 (age 32); Chicago, Illinois, U.S.
- Other names: Sly Tendencies; randomblackdude; Brad Pitt; dar Qness
- Occupations: Rapper; songwriter; record producer; actor
- Years active: 2007–2010; 2012–present
- Spouse: Aida Osman (m. 2025)
- Children: 2
- Parents: Keorapetse William Kgositsile (father); Cheryl Harris (mother)
- Awards: Full list
- Musical career
- Origin: Santa Monica, California, U.S.
- Genres: West Coast hip-hop; alternative hip-hop; abstract hip-hop; jazz rap; horrorcore (early)
- Works: Recording; production
- Labels: Tan Cressida; Warner; Columbia (former)
- Formerly of: Odd Future
- Website: earlsweatshirt.com

Thebe Neruda Kgositsile (Note: /ˈtɛbeɪ ˌkoʊsiːtˈsiːleɪ/ TEB-ay KOH-seet-SEE-lay) (born February 24, 1994), known professionally as Earl Sweatshirt, is an American rapper and record producer. Kgositsile was originally known by the moniker Sly Tendencies when he began rapping in 2008. He changed his name when Tyler, the Creator invited him to join his alternative hip-hop collective Odd Future in late 2009. He is the son of South African political poet Keorapetse Kgositsile.

At age 16, Kgositsile gained recognition and critical praise for his second mixtape, Earl (2010). Shortly after its release, he was sent to a boarding school in Samoa for at-risk teens by his mother, which he attended for a year and a half. Unable to record during his stay, he returned to Los Angeles in February 2012 before his eighteenth birthday. Kgositsile rejoined Odd Future and adopted a recording contract with the group's parent label, Columbia Records to release his debut studio album, Doris (2013).

The album peaked within the top five of the Billboard 200, while his second and third albums, I Don't Like Shit, I Don't Go Outside (2015) and Some Rap Songs (2018), both peaked within the top 20 and were critically praised. He signed with Warner Records to release his second EP, Feet of Clay (2019) as well as his fourth and fifth studio albums, Sick! (2022) and Live Laugh Love (2025). He collaborated with record producer The Alchemist on the joint album Voir Dire (2023). He collaborated with Mike and Surf Gang on the album Pompeii // Utility (2026).

== Early life ==
Thebe Neruda Kgositsile was born on February 24, 1994, in Chicago, Illinois, to Cheryl Harris, a law professor and critical race theorist at the University of California, Los Angeles, and Keorapetse Kgositsile, a South African poet and political activist. Harris and Kgositsile separated when Thebe was six years old. His father is often mentioned in Kgositsile's music and was called a "complicated figure" by Pitchfork. He was presented as a person that was often absent in Kgositsile's life, due to him living in South Africa while Kgositsile lived in Los Angeles, California. Kgositsile stated that "Me and my dad had a relationship that's not uncommon for people to have with their fathers, which is a non-perfect one, talking to him is symbolic and non-symbolic, but it's literally closure for my childhood. Not getting to have that moment left me to figure out a lot with my damn self." Kgositsile attended the UCLA Lab School in Los Angeles and New Roads Middle School & High School in Santa Monica, California.

== Career ==
=== 2008–2009: Career beginnings ===
Kgositsile started rapping in the seventh grade. In 2007, under the name Sly Tendencies, he posted tracks from his mixtape, Kitchen Cutlery, via MySpace. He and two of his friends, Loofy and JW Mijo, formed a rap trio called The Backpackerz. They intended to release a mixtape titled World Playground, but disbanded sometime in 2009.

=== 2009–2011: Earl and hiatus in Samoa ===
In 2009, Tyler, the Creator discovered Kgositsile via his MySpace account after he reached out to Tyler to tell him he was a fan of his work. Kgositsile changed his pseudonym to Earl Sweatshirt and joined Tyler's rap group Odd Future. Kgositsile said he always liked elderly names, hence the name Earl. He is a fan of the multi-instrumentalist James Pants, and decided to follow suit with the clothing theme and come up with the last name Sweatshirt.

Kgositsile's debut mixtape, Earl, was self-released on March 31, 2010, for free digital download on the Odd Future website. Most of the mixtape was produced by Tyler, the Creator. Earl was named the 24th-best album of 2010 by Complex.

Despite positive reactions from critics, various sources indicated that Kgositsile had stopped making music with Odd Future. Posts from Tyler, the Creator's Twitter and Formspring accounts seemed to indicate that Kgositsile's mother would not grant permission to release any of her son's music. Kgositsile expressed in an interview that his mother sent him to Samoa due to getting into trouble with friends. Kgositsile attended Coral Reef Academy, a therapeutic retreat school for at-risk boys, located outside of the Samoan capital of Apia. At Coral Reef Academy, he worked to earn back privileges and the opportunity to return home. At the beginning of his enrollment, he was unable to use the bathroom unsupervised. While there, he read Manning Marable's biography Malcolm X: A Life of Reinvention about Malcolm X and Richard Fariña's counterculture fiction. He wrote rhymes, including most of his verse on "Oldie", his only contribution to Odd Future's studio album The OF Tape Vol. 2. Kgositsile was brought back from Samoa by Leila Steinberg, the first manager of Tupac Shakur, who still manages Earl's career today.

His hiatus led to a movement known as "Free Earl", which stemmed from a post on Odd Future's Tumblr. Chants of the phrase would ensue at the group's shows, and would appear throughout several songs by both the collective and its individual members – leading to media coverage of the movement itself.

=== 2012: Return from Samoa ===
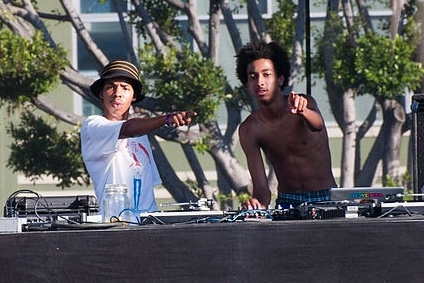
Sweatshirt (left) performing with Taco in September 2012

On February 8, 2012, rumors spread around the internet that Kgositsile had returned to the United States when a video of him surfaced on YouTube with a preview of a new song saying if viewers wanted "the full thing", they would have to give him 50,000 followers on Twitter.

He appeared on the song "Oldie" from Odd Future's debut album The OF Tape Vol. 2. This was Earl's return to Odd Future releases and his first appearance on an Odd Future Records release. On March 20, a video released on the Odd Future YouTube page. It featured him in a cypher, rapping his verse from "Oldie" with the other members of the crew. That same day, Kgositsile performed with the group at the Hammerstein Ballroom in New York City.

On April 9, 2012, rapper Casey Veggies released a mixtape titled Customized Greatly 3, that included a song featuring Earl Sweatshirt, Tyler the Creator, Domo Genesis, and Hodgy Beats titled "PNCINTLOFWGKTA”. During that month, Kgositsile signed on to create his own record label imprint, Tan Cressida, to be distributed through Columbia Records. He turned down several other larger offers due to his priority of remaining close to Odd Future.

Kgositsile was featured on the track "Super Rich Kids" from Frank Ocean's debut album Channel Orange, which released digitally July 10, 2012. On July 16, Domo Genesis and The Alchemist released the first single, "Elimination Chamber", from their collaboration album No Idols, which featured Earl, Vince Staples, and Action Bronson. He was featured on the album again on the tracks "Daily News", featuring himself, SpaceGhostPurrp, and Action Bronson and "Gamebreaker". On July 23, 2012, record producer Flying Lotus released a song titled "Between Friends" on the Adult Swim Single series which featured Earl Sweatshirt and Lotus. Earl Sweatshirt was featured on MellowHype's second studio album Numbers, on the track "P2".

=== 2013: Doris ===
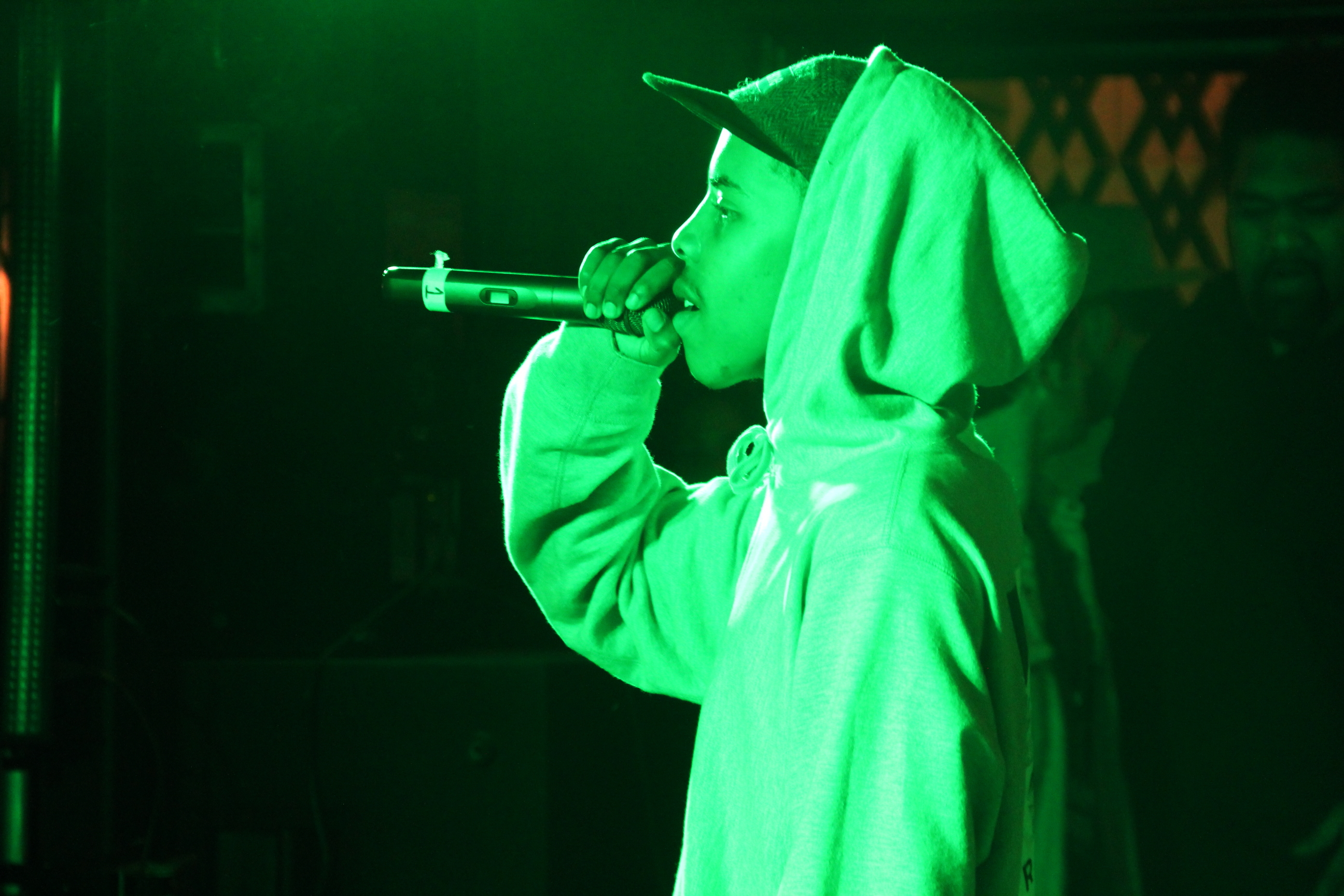
Sweatshirt performing in 2013

On November 2, Kgositsile released his first solo single since his return from Samoa, titled "Chum". On December 4, he announced that his debut studio album would be called Doris. That same day, the music video for "Chum" was posted onto YouTube. Doris was reported early on to feature vocals and/or production from Tyler, the Creator, Frank Ocean, Ommas Keith, Thundercat, Domo Genesis, Mac Miller, the Neptunes, Christian Rich, Vince Staples, BadBadNotGood, Pharrell Williams, Samiyam, The Alchemist, Casey Veggies, The Internet and RZA. On March 6, 2013, while performing with Flying Lotus and Mac Miller, Earl premiered three new songs off Doris: "Burgundy" produced by Pharrell Williams, "Hive" featuring Vince Staples, and "Guild" featuring Mac Miller. Kgositsile confirmed the next single to be titled "Whoa" featuring Tyler, the Creator. The song was released to iTunes on March 12, 2013, along with the music video, which was directed by Tyler, the Creator.

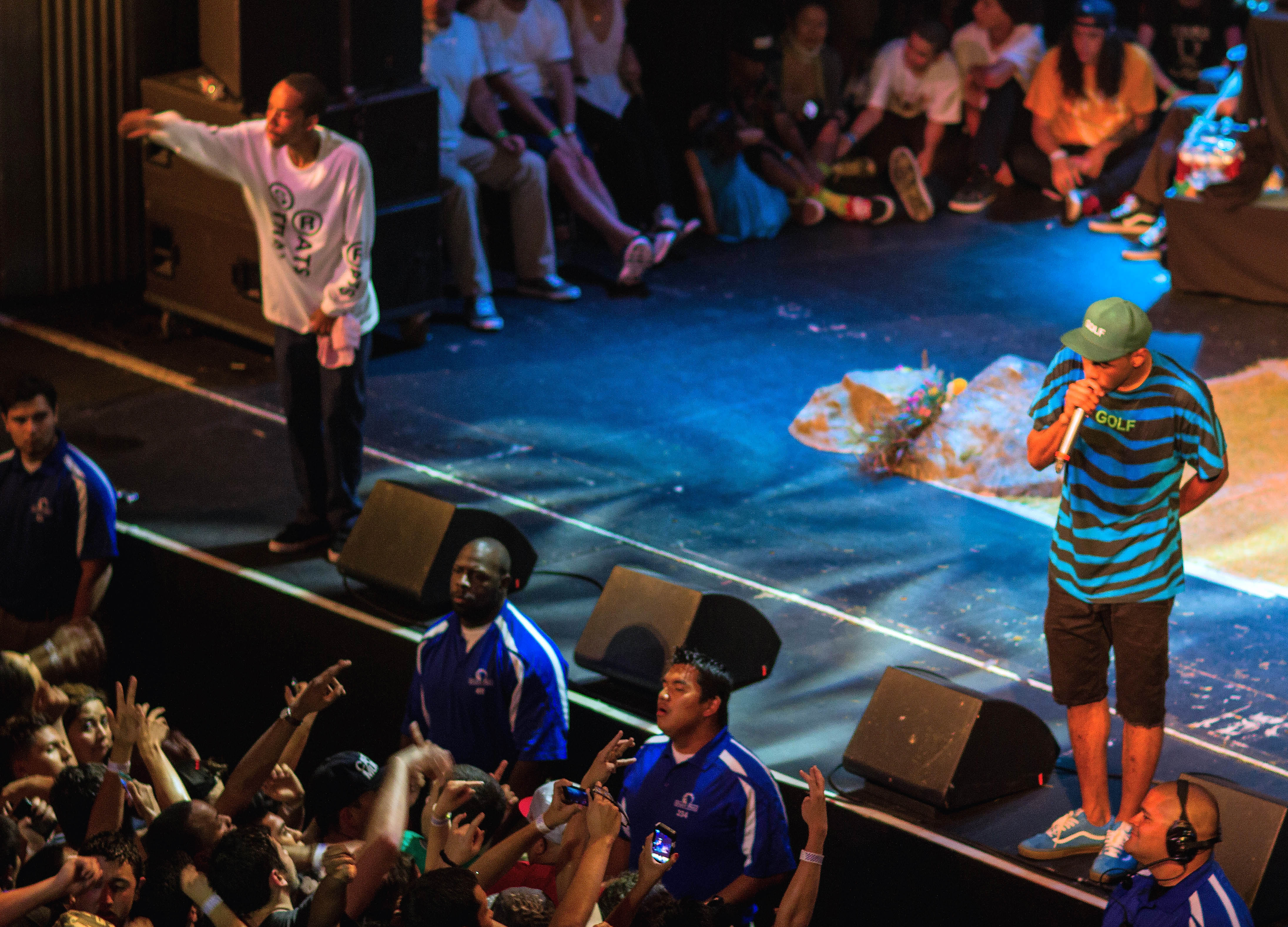
Earl Sweatshirt performing alongside Tyler, the Creator in 2013

Doris was released on August 20, 2013, under Tan Cressida and Columbia Records. Doris featured guest appearances from Odd Future members Domo Genesis, Frank Ocean, Tyler, the Creator, along with Vince Staples, RZA, Casey Veggies and Mac Miller. Production was primarily handled by Kgositsile under the pseudonym randomblackdude and production duo Christian Rich. Additional production was provided by Matt Martians, the Neptunes, RZA, Samiyam, BadBadNotGood, Frank Ocean, and Tyler, the Creator. In September 2013, Complex named Kgositsile the tenth best producer in hip-hop. Upon its release, Doris was met with critical acclaim from music critics, including perfect scores by The Guardian and The Los Angeles Times, which praised Kgositsile's rhyme schemes and lyrics along with the gritty underground production. The album also fared well commercially, debuting at number five on the US Billboard 200 and number one on US Top Rap Albums chart.

=== 2014–2015: I Don't Like Shit, I Don't Go Outside, Solace, and separation from Odd Future ===
On November 12, 2012, Kgositsile announced that he had begun working on his second studio project. The forthcoming album was to be named Gnossos, but he later decided against the title. He cited inspiration from Richard Fariña's 1966 novel Been Down So Long It Looks Like Up to Me. He ultimately decided to take the album in another direction under the name I Don't Like Shit, I Don't Go Outside. On October 10, 2014, Kgositsile confirmed that he had a completed album since June. On November 5, 2014, he released a song entitled "45", produced by The Alchemist. On February 14, 2015, Earl debuted a song titled "Quest/Power" via SoundCloud. He continued to perform unreleased tracks since early 2015, such as "Swamp Vermin", "Vultures", "I Be Outside", "Hell", and "Flowers on the Grave".

On January 5, 2015, Kgositsile released a song titled silenceDArapgame with professional skateboarder Na-Kel Smith under the moniker Hog Slaughta Boyz.

On March 16, 2015, The pre-order for Kgositsile's second studio album, titled: I Don't Like Shit, I Don't Go Outside appeared on the iTunes Store without prior announcement. On March 17, 2015, he released a music video for the song "Grief".

The digital version of the full album was released on March 22, 2015; the physical version was released later on April 14, 2015. A music video for the song "Off Top" was released on August 7, 2015. Kgositsile stated in an interview with NPR that his record label gave him no notice they would release the album. He says he considers this his first album because he feels he can "back up everything, the good and the bad".

On April 28, 2015, a ten-minute track named "Solace" was released on YouTube via an account called dar Qness; the video garnered significant attention, gaining more than 100,000 views in 24 hours. Earl stated to NPR that he was making an album called Solace inspired by his mother, however the project has also been categorized as an EP. The project has not received a release.

By early 2015, speculation was growing that Kgositsile had left Odd Future, a rumour which he confirmed via Twitter on May 28, 2015. This was in response to a Tyler, the Creator tweet that was thought by many to be an announcement of Odd Future's disbandment, although Tyler denied this interpretation. Subsequently, Earl did not appear at Camp Flog Gnaw Carnival in 2015, which many speculated to be due to a conflict between himself and Tyler. However, Tyler tweeted the day after the festival "Thebe and I are fine by the way", seemingly dismissing the rumour.

=== 2016–2019: Some Rap Songs, Feet of Clay, and departure from Columbia Records ===
On January 25, 2016, Kgositsile released three tracks on SoundCloud, "Wind in My Sails", produced by The Alchemist, "Bary", and "Skrt Skrt", produced under his alias randomblackdude. "Wind in My Sails" contains samples from Captain Murphy's song "Children of the Atom", and vocal samples from Gene McDaniels's song "The Parasite (For Buffy)". "Bary" contains vocal samples from Kanye West's song "Barry Bonds". "Skrt Skrt" contains vocal samples from 21 Savage's song "Skrrt Skrrt". On March 4, 2016, Kgositsile was featured on Samiyam's fourth album Animals Have Feelings. The song, "Mirror", was originally meant for I Don't Like Shit, I Don't Go Outside. According to Kgositsile, the song was not included since "the tracklist got fucked up". The music video for "Mirror" was released on June 21, 2016. On August 1, 2016, an instrumental track called "Pelicula" was posted on Apple Music. On August 17, 2016, Kgositsile was featured on Adult Swim Singles Program 2016 on the track "Balance", produced by Knxwledge. On September 4, a track called "Death Whistles" was released on Earl's and Knxwledge's livestream show, Red Bull Music Academy, produced by King Krule.

On September 21, 2018, frequent collaborator The Alchemist released the track listing to his EP Bread, which contains the track "E. Coli", featuring Earl Sweatshirt. On November 2, 2018, frequent collaborator Vince Staples released his album FM!, featuring the track "New earlsweatshirt – Interlude" containing a 20-second verse from Kgositsile. Vince said "Earl is back" and that "his album coming soon" on his Beats 1 show 'Ramona Radio'.

On November 7, 2018, Kgositsile teased the release of new music on social media in a video clip captioned "nowhere2go tomorrow morning tap in." The single "Nowhere2go" was released on November 8, 2018, and received positive reception. On November 20, 2018, he released the single "The Mint", and announced his third studio album, Some Rap Songs, which he slated for a November 30, 2018, release. According to Kgositsile, Some Rap Songs was intended to be themed around his father's death.

On November 30, 2018, Kgositsile released Some Rap Songs to critical acclaim. In January 2019, he said that Some Rap Songs would be his last album with Columbia Records, and that he was "excited to be free because then [he] can do riskier shit".

In May 2019, Kgositsile appeared in a song with Zelooperz titled "Easter Sunday". On November 1, 2019, Kgositsile released his EP Feet of Clay. A deluxe version of Feet of Clay, which included two bonus tracks, was released the following June.

=== 2021–2024: Sick! and Voir Dire ===
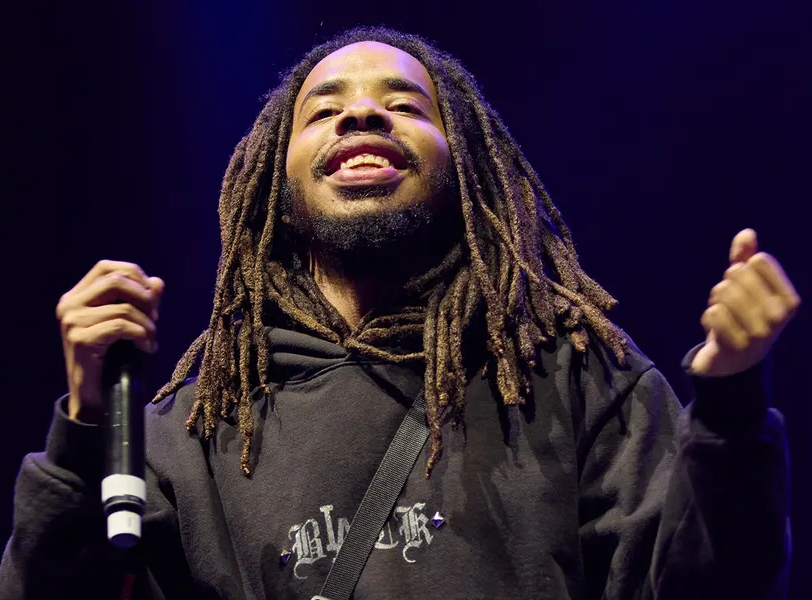
Earl performing at a festival in May 2022

On November 18, 2021, Kgositsile returned with a music video for the single "2010", the first commercial release since his 2019 EP Feet of Clay. On December 9, 2021, Kgositsile released a music video for another single titled "Tabula Rasa", featuring rap group Armand Hammer. Alongside "Tabula Rasa", he announced his fourth studio album, Sick!, which was released on January 14, 2022. Kgositsile released the third single, the Black Noi$e-produced "Titanic" on January 7, 2022. The album features ZelooperZ, and rap group Armand Hammer, with production from Kgositsile himself, The Alchemist, Black Noi$e, Samiyam and more.

In August 2023, a hyperlink titled "hahaha" was added to Kgositsile's website that led to the Gala Music site that would update with puzzles everyday, teasing a project. Initially, the puzzles seemed to point to a tweet published by the Alchemist in 2021 in which he says him and Kgositsile had a full album together and had published it under a fake name on YouTube. On August 22, both the website and The Alchemist's Instagram page was updated with a track list and album name, Voir Dire. The next day, another post was shared announcing a listening party to take place in London on August 25. The website updated once again on August 24, with a music video for the track "Sentry" featuring New York City-based rapper Mike. The album was released for free on August 25, 2023, via Gala Music. The release on Gala Music lead to controversy due to its ties to NFTs. The album released on major streaming services on October 6, 2023. The streaming version has a slightly different tracklist, including two features from Vince Staples.

In July 2024, Earl performed at the Artists for Aid benefit concert in London which raised funds for the Gaza Strip and Sudan.

=== 2025–present: Live Laugh Love and Pompeii // Utility ===
On August 22, 2025, Kgositsile released his fifth studio album Live Laugh Love. The album had been announced the previous week at a listening party on August 15, 2025 which Kgositsile did not attend, instead having an impersonator perform.

The following year, Kgositsile collaborated with Mike and Surf Gang to release Pompeii // Utility on April 3, 2026.

== Artistry ==
Kgositsile has been called a "hip-hop prodigy" and in 2011, was branded by The New Yorker as "the most exciting rapper to emerge in years, a virtuoso who was just starting to figure out what he could do with words." He is characterized primarily by his voice, which has been classified as a "deep baritone".

Kgositsile has taken influence from MF Doom, Jay-Z, J Dilla, Madlib, RZA, Lupe Fiasco, and Clipse.

=== Influence of Mike and Slums ===
Rapper Mike, and the New York underground collective Slums (stylized as sLUms) significantly influenced the lo-fi, sample-based production style of Kgositsile's 2018 album Some Rap Songs.

Kgositsile became connected with Mike and members of Slums through shared creative circles during the years leading up to the album.

Writers note that Kgositsile adopted stylistic elements associated with Mike's loop-driven, lo-fi sound, incorporating similar sampling approaches and abstract vocal layering into the album.

Members of Slums directly contributed to the album as well, including producer Adé Hakim (Sixpress), who worked on the track "Nowhere2go".

Critics have described Some Rap Songs as part of a broader movement of underground experimental rap emerging from New York artists like Mike and Slums.

== Personal life ==
Kgositsile lives in the neighborhood of Mid City, Los Angeles.

Kgositsile struggled with drug abuse, which was one of the reasons why his mother sent him to live in Samoa. The time in Samoa led to Kgositsile getting sober, although he relapsed upon returning to the United States. Kgositsile attributes his drug abuse to time with his collective Odd Future and leaving a long-term relationship, saying he was often smoking marijuana and drinking lean before quitting as he reached adulthood.

Kgositsile was raised as a Nichiren Buddhist and, after a period away from the belief system, he said that he had returned to the religion in 2016.

He had a son in 2021.

In 2025, Kgositsile married actress, writer and comedian Aida Osman, who he had been in a relationship with since August 2022. They had a daughter in July 2025.

== Discography ==
Studio albums

- Doris (2013)
- I Don't Like Shit, I Don't Go Outside (2015)
- Some Rap Songs (2018)
- Sick! (2022)
- Live Laugh Love (2025)

Collaboration albums

- Voir Dire (2023, with The Alchemist)
- Pompeii // Utility (2026, with Mike and Surf Gang)

== Awards and nominations ==
Year	Ceremony	Award	Nominated work	Result
2013	BET Hip Hop Awards	Rookie of the Year	Himself	Nominated
2013	Grammy Awards	Album of the Year	Channel Orange (as featured artist)	Nominated
2013	MTVU Woodie Awards	Breaking Woodie	Himself	Won

== Filmography ==
Year	Title	Notes
2013–2014	Loiter Squad	Series regular; 20 episodes
2013	Late Show with David Letterman	Performed "Rusty" with Tyler, the Creator and Domo Genesis
2013	Late Night with Jimmy Fallon	Performed "Burgundy" with the Roots
2014	106 & Park	Guest
2015	Jimmy Kimmel Live!	Performed "AM // Radio" and "Grief" with BadBadNotGood and Gary Wilson
2015	Crash Test	Musical guest; performed "Burgundy" with Odd Future
2016	Party Legends	Season 1, Episode 2: "Make Mistakes with Na'kel Smith"
2016	Traveling the Stars: Action Bronson and Friends Watch Ancient Aliens	2 episodes
2019	Nowhere, Nobody	Short film
2022	Late Night with Jimmy Fallon	Performed "2010"
2022	Atlanta	Season 4, Episode 1: Guest appearance as Blueblood

== Tours ==
=== Headlining ===
- Doris Tour (2013)
- Earl Wolf Tour (2013)
- Wearld Tour (2014)
- Not Ready to Leave Tour (2015)
- Ready to Leave Now Tour (2015)
- Thebe Kgositsile Presents: Fire It Up! A Tour Starring Earl Sweatshirt & Friends (2019)
- NBA Leather Tour (2022)
- Doris 10th Anniversary Mini-Tour (2023)
- VOIR DIRE Tour (2023)
- European Tour (2024)
- 3LWorld Tour (2025)
- Home on the Range Tour (2026)
