= Cities Aviv =

American rapper

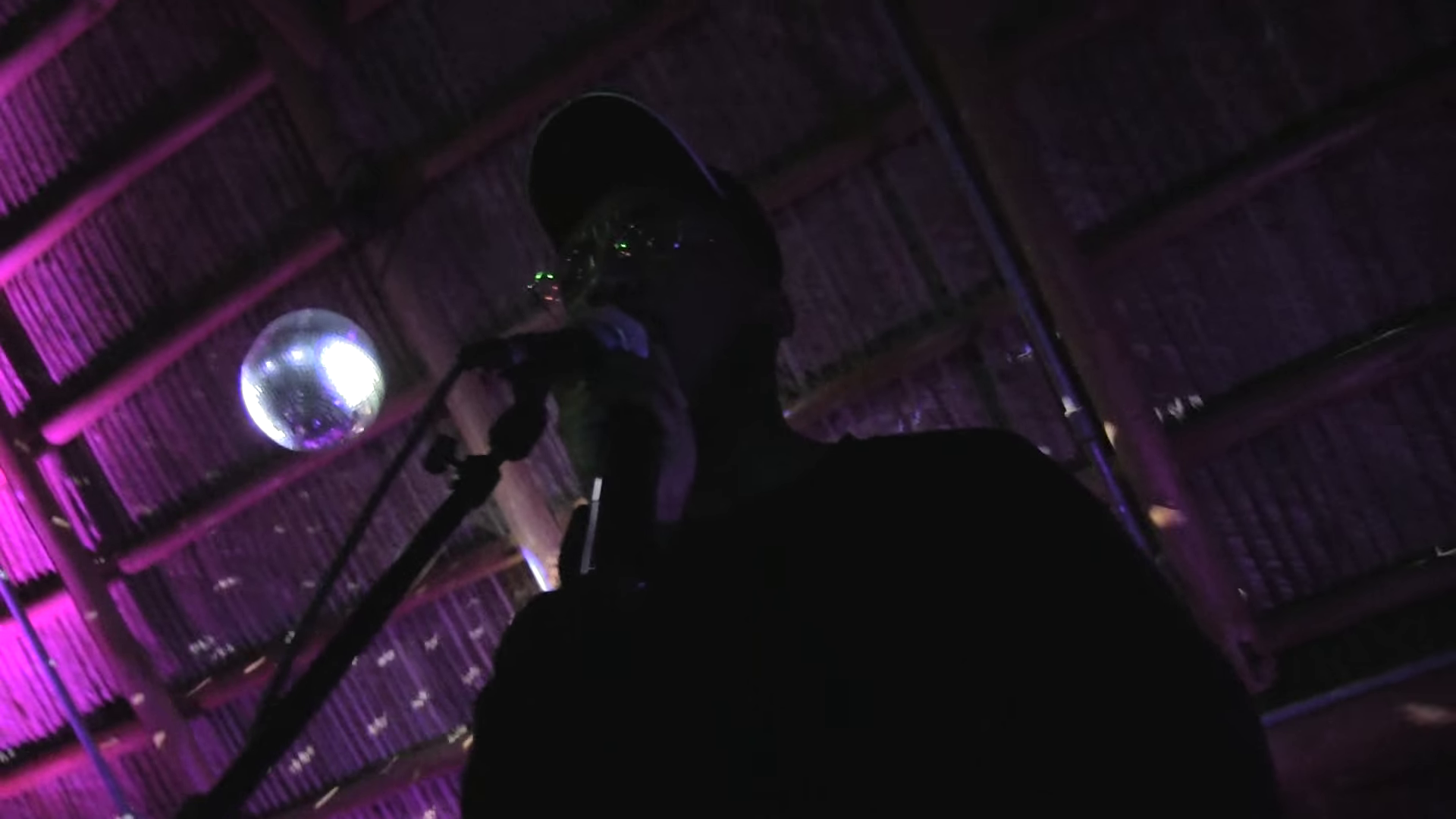
- Mays performing in 2014.

Background information
- Also known as: African-American Sound Recordings
- Born: Wilbert Gavin Mays; May 16, 1989 (age 37)
- Origin: Memphis, Tennessee, U.S.
- Genres: Alternative hip hop; cloud rap
- Occupations: Rapper; songwriter; record producer
- Years active: 2008–present
- Labels: D.O.T./Total Works; Young One; Mishka NYC; Ormolycka; Collect; Fat Sandwich
- Website: dot-audioarts.com

Wilbert Gavin Mays (born May 16, 1989), better known by his stage name Cities Aviv, is an American rapper and record producer from Memphis, Tennessee. He is also the founder of the independent record label Total Works (also known as D.O.T.)

== Early life ==
Gavin Mays was born and raised in Memphis, Tennessee. He attended Overton High School and Cordova High School. In middle school he started listening to hip-hop artists like Non Phixion and Necro as well as rock groups like At the Drive-In and Deadsy. At the age of 20, he dropped out of the University of Memphis, where he studied journalism.

== Career ==
Prior to his career as a rapper, Mays was the lead singer of a hardcore punk band, Copwatch, as well as a roadie for his friend's bands. During his involvement with the band, he began experimenting with hip hop music, eventually making the full leap into the genre. In 2011, he released his debut mixtape, Digital Lows, which received positive reviews from music publications such as Pitchfork and Spin.

In 2012 he relocated to New York and released his follow-up mixtape, Black Pleasure, through streetwear company Mishka NYC's record label before signing to Young One Records. Mays describes his initial intent behind the album as "trying to make a pop record" as well as being inspired by My Bloody Valentine's 1991 album Loveless to bury his vocals in the mix.

After releasing the "URL IRL" single in 2013, he released his debut studio album, Come to Life, on Young One Records in 2014. Shortly thereafter the label ceased operations. He subsequently released his sophomore album Your Discretion Is Trust on Collect Records in 2015 to a more muted reception.

In 2018, he released Raised for a Better View, which forged his canonical outré punk approach together with a new solemn and angular sound. This album was the first edition on Total Works (also known as D.O.T. [Division of Total]). Since then, all of Cities Aviv's output as well as an eclectic array of other artist's projects has been distributed by the label.

Since 2019, Mays has also released music through a side project, entitled African-American Sound Recordings. The work under this project takes more of an experimental instrumental style, utilizing a variety of samples, including original field recording. The style is a blend of hip-hop and more experimental genres such as noise and ambient.

Mays released three full-length albums (Accompanied by a Blazing Solo, GUM, and Immortal Flame) in 2020. These albums are commonly referred to as "The Triad". Mays has said that these records were completely improvised in full. He mentions John Frusciante's album Smile from the Streets You Hold as a minimal inspiration on the recording atmosphere.

In 2021, Mays released The Crashing Sound of How It Goes via D.O.T Records. The album has been described as "an hour-long meditation". Compared to its predecessors, this album saw Mays focus more on writing again. A limited run of cassettes designed by Geng PTP was sold after the initial release.

In 2022, Mays released both Man Plays the Horn and Working Title for the Album Secret Waters. Secret Waters was in large part inspired by a four-day therapy retreat he attended in early 2022.

In 2024, Mays released Cafe Tom Tom, which fans likened to his aforementioned side project, African-American Sound Recordings. Cafe Tom Tom is often considered his most divisive record yet. While some fans welcomed the instrumental sound, others were not so charitable. Later, Mays released Bernadette Leak and Electric Chair in 2024 and 2025, respectively. Electric Chair is considered one of Mays' most sonically experimental releases. Unlike his other albums, the album is characterized by a unique vocal style which fans often compared it to the sound of a sore throat. Nonetheless, both projects were well received.

In March 2026, Mays released Even Colder Spring, marking a new chapter for the rapper. He initially teased the album on social media in December 2025, and in February, he released three tracks from the album exclusively on SoundCloud. On March 6, 2026, he officially revealed its set release date of March 11, 2026. The album was well-received, with many naming it his best body of work since 2022's Working Title for the Album Secret Waters.

== Musical style and influences ==
Cities Aviv is known for his eclectic production style. His songs merge varying stylistic decisions. His early influences partly include Boris, Jay Dee, Die Tödliche Doris, 8Ball & MJG, Black Moon, James Brown, Throbbing Gristle, and noise music. Critics also noted post-punk influences on his works, accompanied by lyrical references to Joy Division and Psychic TV.

== Discography ==
=== Studio albums ===
- 2014 – Come to Life
- 2015 – Your Discretion Is Trust
- 2018 – Raised For A Better View
- 2020 – Immortal Flame
- 2020 – (Score)
- 2020 – GUM
- 2020 – Accompanied by a Blazing Solo
- 2021 – The Crashing Sound of How It Goes
- 2022 – Man Plays the Horn
- 2022 – Working Title for the Album Secret Waters
- 2024 – Cafe Tom Tom
- 2025 – Electric Chair
- 2026 – Even Colder Spring

=== EPs ===
- 2011 - Coastin'
- 2013 - AVI.
- 2020 - Subaru Exit Hatch
- 2024 – Bernadette Leak
- 2025 - Slacks

=== Mixtapes ===
- 2011 – Digital Lows
- 2012 – Black Pleasure 2012

=== Compilations ===
- 2024 - Archive & Practice 001
- 2025 - The Revolving Star: Archive & Practice 002

=== Singles ===
- 2011 – "Wet Dream"
- 2012 – "Flex Your Gold"
- 2012 – "I Want All"
- 2013 – "URL IRL"
- 2016 – "Melanin Drop"
- 2017 – "If I Could Hold Your Soul"
- 2018 – "Black on Earth / Thorns"
- 2018 – "Say No More"
- 2018 – "Get up with Time"
- 2020 – "Life's Only Valid Expression"
- 2021 – "love. fool. revue."
- 2021 – "Episodes"
- 2021 – "WAYS OF THE WORLD"
- 2022 – "Cinema Club"
- 2025 - "Patchwork Demo"

=== Guest appearances ===
Title	Year	Artist(s)	Album
"She's a Buddhist, I'm a Cubist"	2012	Lushlife	Plateau Vision
"Torn Victor"	2013	Knifefight	Knifefight
"Number One"	2014	Mr. Flash	Sonic Crusader
"Moshin in the Front"	2014	Mykki Blanco	Gay Dog Food
"Home Box Office"	2016	Nasty Nigel	El Ultimo Playboy: La Vida Y Los Tiempos De Nigel Rubirosa
"Stress"	2017	Show Me the Body	Corpus I
"Rise"	2017	Beach Fossils	Somersault
"Had a Choice"	2018	Lukah	Chickenwire
"Diamond Wizard"	2018	Beans	Wolves of the World
"Top Friction"	2020	NAH	Mortal Glitch
"Big Silence Muted"	2020	NAH	Mortal Glitch
"Immaculate Conception"	2021	Lukah	Why Look Up, God's in the Mirror
"Slice"	2022	Griff Spex	(Live) From Transmutation
"Rare Forumlaz"	2022	Lukah	Raw Extractions

=== Production Credits ===
Title	Year	Artist(s)	Album	Co-Producer(s)
"1 Million Limos"	2013	Antwon	In Dark Denim	—N/a
"Still Guarded"	2013	Antwon	In Dark Denim	—N/a
"During Mimis"	2014	Antwon	Heavy Hearted in Doldrums	—N/a
"No static"	2017	Remy Banks	Champ Hoody Music Ep. 1	—N/a
"Joy Luck Club"	2017	Big Baby Gandhi	27	—N/a
"Magic"	2018	XHOSA	Lvl 9	—N/a
"Amazon Wishlist"	2021	Antwon	Balikbayan Box	Shawn Kemp
"Trap Olympics !"	2022	Bear1Boss	Star Status*	Popstar Benny
"Biskhit - Plank !"	2022	Bear1Boss	Star Status*	Popstar Benny
"Body Paint"	2022	Sharc	Star Status*	Popstar Benny
"Black Belt Jones"	2022	Lukah	Raw Extractions	—N/a
"Fractures"	2022	Lukah	Raw Extractions	—N/a
"Rare Formulaz"	2022	Lukah	Raw Extractions	—N/a
"Spooks Blues"	2023	Lukah	Permanently Blackface (The 1st Expression)	—N/a
