= Sporting Life (musician) =

- Born: Eric Adiele; Virginia, U.S.
- Origin: New York City, New York, U.S.
- Genres: Hip hop; electronic
- Occupations: Record producer; rapper; songwriter; artist; architect
- Instruments: Ableton; Roland SP-555; vocals
- Years active: 2011−present
- Label: R&S
- Formerly of: Ratking

Eric Adiele, known professionally as Sporting Life, is an American record producer, rapper, songwriter and visual artist. He is best known for being a member of New York City hip hop group Ratking with American rappers Wiki and Hak. Adiele has since gone on to release several solo albums and extended plays (EPs) under R&S Records.

== Discography ==
=== Studio albums ===
List of studio albums, with year released
Title	Album details
55 5's	Released: September 18, 2015; Label: R&S; Formats: digital download, cassette
HBCU Gameday	Released: January 3, 2020; Label: R&S; Formats: digital download
Labplex.eco	Released: May 22, 2020; Label: R&S; Formats: digital download
Higher Ground	Released: July 11, 2021; Label: R&S; Formats: digital download
Art21	Released: March 19, 2024; Label: Ready Radio 1; Formats: digital download

=== Extended plays ===
List of extended plays, with year released
Title	Album details
Slam Dunk Vol. 1	Released: September 2, 2016; Label: R&S; Formats: digital download
Slam Dunk Vol. 2	Released: September 30, 2016; Label: R&S; Formats: digital download
Slam Dunk Vol. 3	Released: November 4, 2016; Label: R&S; Formats: digital download
Black Diamond	Released: September 27, 2019; Label: R&S; Formats: digital download

=== Compilations ===
List of compilations, with year released
Title	Album details
Slam Dunk	Released: May 19, 2017; Label: R&S; Formats: digital download

=== Guest appearances ===
List of non-single guest appearances, with other performing artists, showing year released and album name
Title	Year	Artist(s)	Album
"God Bless Me"	2015	Wiki, Skepta	Lil Me

== Production discography ==
=== 2011 ===
Wiki - 1993

- 01. "Retired Sports"
- 02. "Pretty Picture"
- 03. "646 - 704 - 2610"
- 04. "Piece of Shit"
- 05. "Wikispeaks"
- 06. "Sporting Life"

=== 2012 ===
Ratking - Wiki93

- 01. "Retired Sports"
- 02. "Pretty Picture"
- 03. "646 - 704 - 2610"
- 04. "Piece of Shit"
- 05. "Wikispeaks"
- 06. "Comic"
- 07. "Sporting Life"

=== 2013 ===
Ratking -

- "100"

=== 2014 ===
Ratking - So It Goes

- 01. "*" (produced with DJ Dog Dick)
- 02. "Canal"
- 03. "Snow Beach" (produced with Isaiah Barr)
- 04. "So Sick Stories" (featuring King Krule) (produced with King Krule and DJ Dog Dick)
- 05. "Remove Ya"
- 06. "Eat" (produced with DJ Dog Dick)
- 07. "So It Goes"
- 08. "Puerto Rican Judo" (featuring Wavy Spice)
- 09. "Protein" (produced with DJ Dog Dick)
- 10. "Bug Fights"
- 11. "Take" (featuring Salomon Faye)
- 12. "Cocoa '88" (featuring DJ Dog Dick)

=== 2015 ===
Ratking - 700-Fill

- 01. "American Gods" (featuring Remy Banks, Teddy and Slicky Boy)
- 02. "Arnold Palmer"
- 03. "Bethel"
- 04. "Eternal Reveal"
- 05. "Flurry"
- 06. "Lepane Lane" (featuring Slicky Boy)
- 07. "Steep Tech" (featuring Despot and Princess Nokia)
- 08. "Sticky Trap"
- 09. "Makeitwork"

Remy Banks - higher.

- 01. "inhale."
- 02. "let em know."
- 10. "feast." (featuring Hak)

Wiki - Lil Me

- 01. "WikiFlag" (produced with Madlib)
- 04. "Hit the L" (featuring Hak) (produced with Isaac Sleator)
- 05. "Old Blocks New Kids" (featuring Jadasea) (produced with Isaiah Barr)
- 06. "Cherry Tree" (featuring Micachu) (produced with Micachu)
- 09. "Lil Me" (produced with Dev Hynes)
- 13. "Patience" (featuring Antwon)
- 15. "Ioneedmuch" (featuring Teddy AF)

Kelela - Hallucinogen Remixes

- 03. "Rewind (Sporting Life Remix)"

=== 2017 ===
Eric Copeland - Black Bubblegum Remixed

- 04. "Rip It (Sporting Life Remix)"

Wiki - No Mountains in Manhattan

- 05. "Chinatown Swing"
- 10. "Pandora’s Box" (featuring Evy Jane) (produced with Dadras)

=== 2019 ===
MIKE - Tears of Joy

- 09. "It's Like Basketball" (produced with DJ Blackpower)

Wiki - Oofie

- 06. "4 Clove Club"
