= Duendita =

American musician

Candace Lee Camacho, known professionally as duendita is an American musician. They are based in Queens, New York. They have released a studio album Direct Line to My Creator (2018) and an extended play The Mind is a Miracle (2024).

== Early life ==
Candace Lee Camacho was born and raised in Jamaica, Queens, New York. They went to Fiorello H. LaGuardia High School then participated in New York University's Future Music Mogul program.

Their moniker duendita came from their high school nickname which was a play on duende, a concept explored by Spanish writer Federico García Lorca.

== Career ==
Duendita released a single "one of one" in 2014. In May 2017, they released a single "yikes!" as the lead single of their debut studio album. Their debut studio album, Direct Line to My Creator, was released on November 9, 2018. It served as their senior thesis project from New York University Tisch School of the Arts. Following its release, Camacho took a hiatus from music due to mental health crisis.

In March 2024, Camacho presented an audiovisual performance about resilience on the East River that was recorded in Riverside Puerto Rican communities across New York City, Sound River, at the Abrons Arts Center. In September 2024, they released an extended play The Mind is a Miracle. They released their second album, A Strong Desire to Survive, on April 4, 2025. Their album Existential Thottie released on April 29, 2026.

== Discography ==
=== Studio albums ===
List of studio albums, with selected details.
| Title | Album details |
|---|---|
| Direct Line to My Creator | Released: November 9, 2018; Label: The Vanguarde; Format: Digital download, streaming |
| A Strong Desire to Survive | Released: April 4, 2025; Label: 10k; Format: Digital download, streaming |
| Existential Thottie | Released: April 29, 2026; Label: 10k; Format: Digital download, streaming |

=== Extended plays ===
List of extended plays, with selected details.
| Title | Album details |
|---|---|
| The Mind is a Miracle | Released: September 27, 2024; Label: Freedom Dr; Format: Digital download |

=== Singles ===
==== As lead artist ====
| Title | Year | Album |
|---|---|---|
| "One of One" | 2014 | Non-album single |
| "Yikes!" | 2017 | Direct Line to My Creator |
| "Another Time (World$Tar Money)" (Simon Eng with duendita) | 2017 | Non-album singles |
| "Let Me Live" | 2020 | Non-album singles |
| "Mind" | 2020 | Non-album singles |
| "Yaya My Favorite" | 2020 | Non-album singles |
| "Us (How Sweet It Was)" (Ricky Reed with Jim James and duendita) | 2020 | The Room |
| "Open Eyes" | 2021 | Non-album singles |
| "Bio" | 2021 | Non-album singles |
| "Feel" (featuring Joy Guidry) | 2022 | The Mind is a Miracle |
| "Planetary" | 2024 | The Mind is a Miracle |
| "Born with power" | 2024 | The Mind is a Miracle |
| "Baby Teeth" | 2025 | A Strong Desire to Survive |
| "Piel" | 2025 | Non-album single |

==== As featured artist ====
| Title | Year | Album |
|---|---|---|
| "On a Warm Spring Night You Stunned Me" (Zugzwang featuring duendita) | 2016 | Non-album singles |
| "Paradise" (Akatsuki featuring duendita) | 2018 | Non-album singles |
| "Onsite" (Bakery featuring duendita) | 2019 | Non-album singles |
| "How Beautiful (she is)" (Salt Cathedral featuring duendita) | 2020 | Non-album singles |
| "Lethal" (Noah Becker featuring Isaiah Barr and duendita) | 2022 | Non-album singles |
| "Runnin" (Polarboiyeahz featuring duendita) | 2023 | Non-album singles |

=== Guest appearances ===
List of non-single guest appearances, with other performing artists, showing year released and album name
| Title | Year | Other artist(s) | Album |
|---|---|---|---|
| "angel" | 2018 | Odunsi the Engine | rare. |
| "I Will Go Until No End to Feel Your Heart Beat Next to Mine" | 2019 | Cxltgod | The Freakshow of the Century, Pt. 1 |
| "#memories" | 2019 | Mike | Tears of Joy |
| "Different cloth." | 2019 | Remy Banks | did this in detroit. |
| "Promises" | 2019 | Wiki | Oofie |
| "Paint Ain't Mine" | 2020 | Zelooperz | Gremlin |
| "Glitch" | 2020 | Black Noi$e | Oblivion |
| "Still Here" | 2021 | Wiki | Half God |
| "Time Is" | 2022 | Zelooperz | Get WeT.Radio |
| "Tiny Garden" | 2023 | Jamila Woods | Water Made Us |
| "Miss U" | 2025 | Mike | Showbiz! |
| "Bloom" | 2026 | Wiki | Ancient History |

== Tours ==
Opening act

- Crumb – Ice Melt Tour (2021)
- Homeshake – North American Tour (2022)
- Etran de L'Aïr – North American Tour (2024)
- Empress Of – For Your Consideration Tour (2024)
