= Ancient History (album) =

Studio album by Wiki
- Released: June 12, 2026
- Genre: Hip-hop
- Length: 45:15
- Label: Wikset Enterprise
- Producers: The Alchemist; Carlos Truly; Carrtoons; DJ BlackPower; Nick Hakim; Laron; Lil Ugly Mane; Lord Unknown; Dominic Maker; Navy Blue; Subjxct 5; Tony Seltzer; Zoomo

Wiki chronology
14K Figaro (2023)	Ancient History (2026)

Singles from Ancient History
- 1. "Park" Released: May 21, 2026; 2. "Right Away" Released: June 4, 2026

Ancient History is a studio album by the American rapper Wiki. It was released on June 12, 2026, through Wikset Enterprise. It is Wiki's first fully solo album since Oofie (2019), following several collaborative projects. Its release was preceded by the singles "Park" and "Right Away".

The album includes guest appearances by Your Old Droog, Duendita, and Salimata, with production from the Alchemist, Navy Blue, Nick Hakim, and others. Ancient History received generally positive reviews from critics, who described it as a New York-centered album about aging, memory, and personal change. Stereogum selected it as its Album of the Week.

== Background and release ==
Wiki told Hearing Things that work on Ancient History began in 2022, when he first recorded the Alchemist-produced title track. In the same interview, he described the album as reflecting several years of personal change.

Wiki announced Ancient History on May 21, 2026. Pitchfork reported that it was his first solo album in seven years and that it would be released on June 12 through his own label, Wikset Enterprise. The announcement identified "Park" as the album's first single and said the cover was painted by Esteban Jefferson. Stereogum described Ancient History as Wiki's first fully solo record since Oofie (2019), after several full-length collaborations with individual producers. Wiki shared "Right Away" as another single on June 4. It followed 14K Figaro, a collaborative album by Wiki and Tony Seltzer released through Wikset Enterprise in November 2023.

The album includes guest appearances by Your Old Droog, Duendita, and Salimata. It also included production from the Alchemist, Navy Blue, Nick Hakim, Dominic Maker, Laron and Mike, under his DJ Blackpower alias.

== Music and lyrics ==
Reviewers characterized Ancient History as centered on Wiki's relationship with New York City and with aging. Writing for Pitchfork, Lei Takanashi described the album as moving away from some of the energy of Wiki's earlier work and toward somber production that gives his words more space; he wrote that Wiki used the album to rap about growing older in a rapidly changing city. Tom Breihan of Stereogum described the production as built around "dazed, floaty beats" and soul samples, and wrote that Wiki reflects on changes in New York and on the city's history. In Treble, Parker Bennett wrote that the album emphasizes Wiki's "therapeutic" writing and keeps its focus on Wiki himself despite the presence of several collaborators.

Several reviews discussed individual songs in relation to New York and personal reflection. Takanashi wrote that "Bloom", which features Duendita, addresses gentrification and the housing crisis, and interpreted "Bourbon" as addressing alcoholism. Breihan described "Park" as a song about New York City parks and wrote that the Alchemist-produced "Ancient History" closes the album in a softer, dreamlike register. Bennett described "IHNY" as a song about the city's duality, "Marm Era" as a tribute to Wiki's childhood, and "All in the Lining" as a track with Your Old Droog that draws on New York rap tradition.

== Critical reception ==
Professional ratings
Review scores
Source	Rating
The Needle Drop	7/10
Pitchfork	7.8/10

Stereogum named Ancient History its Album of the Week. Breihan wrote that the album works as a portrait of Wiki looking at his own past and at how New York shaped him, and discussed the production on "Bloom" and the title track favorably. In Pitchfork, Takanashi rated the album 7.8 out of 10 and described Wiki's New York detail as central to the album, but wrote that some of its production experiments did not move far beyond his earlier work with Nah or Ratking. Bennett wrote for Treble that the album shows Wiki's conversational style and everyman perspective, and said that its focus on heritage and spirituality distinguishes it from parts of his earlier catalog.

== Track listing ==
All lyrics are written by Patrick Morales, except "Bloom" (written with Candace Lee Camacho), "All in the Lining" (written with Your Old Droog), and "Something New" (written with Salma Calhoun).

Ancient History track listing
No.	Title	Music	Producer(s)	Length
1.	"GTFOH"	Patrick Morales; Nicholas Tadera	Lord Unknown	2:09
2.	"Right Away"	Morales; Laron Wages	Laron	2:57
3.	"One Time"	Morales; Ben Carr	Carrtoons	2:56
4.	"Park"	Morales	Zoomo	2:52
5.	"IHNY"	Morales; Sage Elsesser	Navy Blue	3:02
6.	"Bloom" (featuring Duendita)	Morales; Candace Lee Camacho; Travis Miller	Lil Ugly Mane	3:49
7.	"Old Gods"	Morales; Bily de Figueras; Antonio Hernandez	Tony Seltzer; Carlos Truly	2:49
8.	"Bourbon"	Morales; Dangadya Williams	Subjxct 5	3:47
9.	"All in the Lining" (featuring Your Old Droog)	Morales; Elsesser; Your Old Droog	Navy Blue	3:29
10.	"Marm Era"	Morales; Wages	Laron	2:58
11.	"Had Your Fun"	Morales; Dominic Maker	Maker	4:04
12.	"Something New" (featuring Salimata)	Morales; Michael Bonema; Calhoun	DJ BlackPower	2:26
13.	"7 Deadly Sins"	Morales; Nick Hakim	Hakim	3:00
14.	"Ancient History"	Morales; Alan Maman	The Alchemist	4:57
Total length:				45:15
