= Come to Life =

Come to Life may refer to:

- Come to Life (Natalie Imbruglia album), 2009
- Come to Life (Cities Aviv album), 2014
- "Come to Life" (song), a song by Kanye West
- "Come to Life", a song by Alter Bridge from Blackbird
- "Come to Life", a song by Jefferson Starship from Dragon Fly
