= Lil Me =

Mixtape by Wiki
- Released: December 7, 2015
- Recorded: 2013–15
- Genre: Hip-hop
- Length: 120:35
- Label: Letter Racer
- Producers: Matt Lubanksy (exec.); Sporting Life (also exec.); Black Mack; Black Milk; Black Noi$e; DJ Lucas; Harry Fraud; Kaytranada; Lee Bannon; Madlib; Micachu; Skywlkr; Yung Gutted

Wiki chronology
1993 (2011)	Lil Me (2015)	What Happened to Fire? (2017)

Singles from Lil Me
- 1. "Livin' with My Moms" Released: November 30, 2015; 2. "Patience" Released: February 9, 2016; 3. "3 Stories" Released: June 8, 2016

Lil Me is the debut mixtape by American rapper Wiki. It was released on December 7, 2015, by Letter Racer Records. The mixtape features guest appearances from his Ratking cohorts Hak and Sporting Life, as well as Skepta, Antwon, Micachu, and Nasty Nigel, among others. The mixtape is supported by three singles, "Livin' with My Moms", "Patience", and "3 Stories".

== Background ==
Wiki considers Lil Me to be his first "official solo project," despite releasing an EP in 2011 called 1993. That project would later get re-released with his group Ratking as Wiki93 on November 6, 2012.

== Release and promotion ==
On November 30, 2015, the lead single "Livin' with My Moms" was released along with a supporting music video. On January 8, 2016, the deluxe edition of Lil Me was released digitally. It included the mixtape as well as lyrics, a digital booklet, a music video for the track "Crib Tax", and a bonus track "Hate is Earned" produced by Black Milk. On February 9, 2016, a music video for "Patience" was released. On March 18, 2016, a remix for the track "God Bless Me" featuring an additional verse from Antwon was released. On June 8, 2016, a music video for "3 Stories" was released.

== Track listing ==
No.	Title	Writer(s)	Producer(s)	Length
1.	"WikiFlag"	Patrick Morales; Otis Jackson Jr.; Eric Adiele; Benamin Julia; Isaac Sleator	Madlib; Sporting Life	4:25
2.	"Livin' with My Moms" (featuring Nasty Nigel)	Morales; Robert Mansel; Nigel Reynoso	Black Noi$e	5:10
3.	"Seedy Motherfucker"	Morales; Archy Marshall	Black Mack	4:08
4.	"Hit the L" (featuring Hak)	Morales; Adiele; Hakeem Lewis; Sleator	Sporting Life	4:01
5.	"Old Blocks New Kids" (featuring Jadasea)	Morales; Adiele; Isaiah Barr	Sporting Life	5:21
6.	"Cherry Tree" (featuring Micachu)	Morales; Mica Levi; Adiele	Micachu; Sporting Life	4:27
7.	"God Bless Me" (featuring Sporting Life and Skepta)	Morales; Skylar Tait; Adiele; Joseph Adenuga	Skywlkr	4:54
8.	"Club Shit"	Morales; Lucas Kendall; Barr	DJ Lucas	3:50
9.	"Lil Me"	Morales; Adiele; Devonté Hynes	Sporting Life	3:45
10.	"3 Stories"	Morales; Louis Celestin; Barr	Kaytranada	3:54
11.	"Whole Half" (featuring Antwon and Jesse James Solomon)	Morales; Antonio Hernandez; Antonio Williams; Jesse Solomon	Yung Gutted	4:26
12.	"Sunday School Dropout" (featuring Hak)	Morales; Rory Quigley; Lewis	Harry Fraud	4:40
13.	"Patience" (featuring Antwon)	Morales; Adiele; Williams	Sporting Life	3:59
14.	"Crib Tax"	Morales; Celestin; Shawn Powers	Kaytranada	3:52
15.	"Ioneedmuch" (featuring Teddy AF)	Morales; Adiele	Sporting Life	3:33
16.	"Sonatine" (featuring Slicky Boy)	Morales; Fred Warmsley III; Nicholas Hakim	Lee Bannon	4:12
17.	"Sun Showers" (featuring Teddy AF)	Morales	Black Mack	5:06
18.	"Spiritual Guidance from Aaron Bondaroff"	Aaron Bondaroff		46:43
Total length:				120:35

Deluxe edition bonus track
No.	Title	Writer(s)	Producer(s)	Length
19.	"Hate is Earned"	Morales; Curtis Cross	Black Milk	1:29
Total length:				122:04

Notes

- "Crib Tax" contains uncredited vocals from Shawn Powers.
- "Sonatine" contains uncredited vocals from Nick Hakim.

== Personnel ==
- Andrew Kass - artwork
- Antwon - featured artist, vocals
- Benamin - mixing, arrangements, congas
- Black Mack - producer
- Black Milk - producer
- Black Noi$e - producer
- Daddy Kev - mastering
- Dev Hynes - bass guitar
- DJ Lucas - producer
- Hak - featured artist, vocals
- Harry Fraud - producer, mixing, recording engineer
- Isaac Sleator - synthesizer
- Isaiah Barr - producer, piano, saxophone
- Jadasea - featured artist, vocals
- Jesse James Solomon - featured artist, vocals
- Kaytranada - producer
- King Krule - guitar
- Lee Bannon - producer
- Madlib - producer
- Matt Lubanksy - executive producer
- Micachu - featured artist, vocals, producer
- Nasty Nigel - featured artist, vocals
- Nick Hakim - background vocals
- Shawn Powers - background vocals
- Skepta - featured artist, vocals
- SKYWLKR - producer
- Sporting Life - executive producer, featured artist, vocals, producer
- Wiki - primary artist, vocals
- Yung Gutted - producer
