= Fireplace: TheNotTheOtherSide =

Studio album by Hodgy
- Released: December 9, 2016
- Recorded: 2014–16
- Studio: Violet Phoenix, Redwoods, CA; Gonzalo Contreras of Geeflow - Premier Studios, NY; Studio 69, Toronto, ON; Konscious Studios, Santa Monica, CA; Bernie Grundman Mastering, Hollywood, CA
- Genre: Hip-hop
- Length: 38:28
- Label: Odd Future; Columbia
- Producer: 88-Keys; BadBadNotGood; Garcia Bros.; Hi-Tek; Jonti; Knxwledge; Nottz; Rahki; Unknown Mortal Orchestra

Hodgy chronology
Dukkha (2016)	Fireplace: TheNotTheOtherSide (2016)	Entitled (2022)

Singles from Fireplace: TheNotTheOtherSide
- 1. "Barbell" Released: November 18, 2016; 2. "Final Hour" Released: December 2, 2016; 3. "Glory" Released: February 21, 2017

Professional ratings
Aggregate scores
Source	Rating
Metacritic	68/100
Review scores
Source	Rating
Allmusic	link
Exclaim!	7/10
HotNewHipHop	85/100
Pitchfork	5.0/10
XXL	L (3/5)

Fireplace: TheNotTheOtherSide is the debut studio album by American rapper Hodgy. It was released on December 9, 2016, by Odd Future Records and Columbia Records. With guest appearances from Lil Wayne, Busta Rhymes and Salomon Faye, the album is also supported by three singles, "Barbell", "Final Hour" and "Glory."

Fireplace: TheNotTheOtherSide is the only studio album under the stage name Hodgy, as Gerard Long began releasing music as Jerry (stylized as "jerry.") in 2023. The album is also the final release on the Odd Future Records label before going defunct.

== Track listing ==
No.	Title	Writer(s)	Producer(s)	Length
1.	"Nitro"			0:55
2.	"Kundalini" (featuring Salomon Faye)	Gerard Long; Salomon Faye; Ruban Nielson	Unknown Mortal Orchestra	2:14
3.	"Barbell"	Long; Jonti Danilewitz	Jonti	3:13
4.	"Resurrection"	Long; Columbus Smith III; Sarah Winters	Rahki	3:37
5.	"They Want"	Long; Dominick Lamb; Alan Hawkshaw	Nottz	3:19
6.	"Final Hour" (featuring Busta Rhymes)	Long; Charles Njapa; Trevor Smith, Jr.; John D. Loudermilk	88-Keys	4:13
7.	"Glory"	Long; Tony Cottrell	Hi-Tek	3:28
8.	"Laguna"	Long; Danilewitz	Jonti	3:04
9.	"Turkuoise"	Long; Danilewitz	Jonti	2:40
10.	"Tape Beat" (featuring Lil Wayne)	Long; Chester Hansen; Alexander Sowinski; Matthew Tavares; Leland Whitty; Dwayne Carter, Jr.	BadBadNotGood	3:11
11.	"Dreaminofthinkin"	Long; Glen Boothe; Myron Davis; Joshua Honigstock	Knxwledge	2:09
12.	"The Now"	Long; Lamb; Franco Pisano, Jr.	Nottz	3:02
13.	"DYSLM"	Long; Larry Sheffey; Vic Wainstein; Liam Hillard Sternberg	Garcia Bros.	3:21
Total length:				38:28

Notes

- "Resurrection" features additional vocals by Sarah Winters.

Sample credits

- "They Want" contains a sample from "A Man Alone" written and performed by Alan Hawkshaw
- "Final Hour" contains a sample from "Indian Reservation (The Lament of the Cherokee Reservation Indian)" written by J.D. Loudermilk and performed by Paul Revere & the Raiders
- "Dreaminofthinkin" contains samples from "No Other Love" written by Myron Davis & Joshua Honigstock performed by Myron
- "The Now" contains samples from "Voglia D'Amore" written by Franco Pisano, Jr. and performed by Berto and Junior Pisano Orchestra with Edda Dell'Orso
- "DYSLM" contains samples from "It's So Different Here" written by Liam Sternberg and performed by Rachel Sweet

== Personnel ==
Credits for Fireplace: TheNotTheOtherSide adapted from his official website and AllMusic

- Hodgy – primary artist, artwork
- Vic Wainstein – engineer, mixing, recorder, writer
- Mike Bozzi – mastering
- Russel Lee – layout
- Chris & Kelly Clancy of 4 Strikes – management
- Preston Hui of 4 Strikes – project manager
- Judy Miller Silverman & Spencer Kilgore of Motormouth Media – publicity
- Salomon Faye – featured artist, writer
- Ruban Nielson – writer
- Unknown Mortal Orchestra – producers
- Jonti Danilewitz – producer, writer
- Columbus Smith III – producer, writer
- Sarah Winters – additional vocals
- Dominick Lamb – producer, writer
- Charles Njapa – producer, writer
- Trevor Smith Jr. – featured artist, writer
- Tony Cottrell – producer, writer
- Matthew Tavares – producer, engineer, mixing, writer
- Alexander Sowinski – producer, writer
- Chester Hansen – producer, writer
- Leland Whitty – producer, writer
- Dwayne Carter – featured artist, writer
- Glen Boothe – producer, writer
- Garcia Bros. – producers, writers
