= Trouble the Water (disambiguation) =

Trouble the Water may refer to:

- Trouble the Water, a 2008 film
- Trouble the Water (album), a 2022 studio album by Show Me the Body
- "Trouble the Water" (The Punisher), an episode of The Punisher
