= Nobody Knows. =

Nobody Knows

Studio album by Willis Earl Beal
- Released: September 10, 2013
- Genre: Soul, gospel, folk
- Length: 56:55
- Label: XL

Willis Earl Beal chronology
Acousmatic Sorcery (2012)	Nobody Knows (2013)

Professional ratings
Aggregate scores
Source	Rating
Metacritic	74/100
Review scores
Source	Rating
Allmusic	4/5 stars
NME	8/10
MusicOMH	4/5 stars
Drowned in Sound	8/10
Line of Best Fit	8/10
Under the Radar	7.5/10
Pitchfork	7.2/10
No Ripcord	7/10
Spin Magazine	7/10
Consequence of Sound	3.5/5 stars
This Is Fake DIY	7/10
Filter Magazine	77%

Nobody Knows is the second studio album by musician Willis Earl Beal. It was released in September 2013 under XL Recordings.

== Track listing ==
No.	Title	Writer(s)	Length
1.	"Wavering Lines"	Willis Earl Beal, Rodaidh McDonald	3:54
2.	"Coming Through" (featuring Cat Power)	Willis Earl Beal, Jason Eckerson	3:55
3.	"Everything Unwinds"	Willis Earl Beal	3:30
4.	"Burning Bridges"	Willis Earl Beal, Rodaidh McDonald	4:59
5.	"Disintegrating"	Willis Earl Beal	4:35
6.	"Too Dry to Cry"	Willis Earl Beal	4:39
7.	"What's the Deal?"	Willis Earl Beal, Rodaidh McDonald, Ben Clarke	4:40
8.	"Ain't Got No Love"	Willis Earl Beal, Ben Clarke, Cara Lane	5:20
9.	"White Noise"	Willis Earl Beal	4:33
10.	"Hole in the Roof"	Willis Earl Beal, Jahphet Landis	3:39
11.	"Blue Escape"	Willis Earl Beal	3:07
12.	"Nobody Knows"	Willis Earl Beal, Rodaidh McDonald	4:00
13.	"The Flow"	Willis Earl Beal, Ben Clarke, Cara Lane	6:04
