= So It Goes (Ratking album) =

Studio album by Ratking
- Released: April 8, 2014
- Recorded: 2013−14
- Genre: Hip hop; alternative hip hop
- Length: 51:40
- Label: HXC; XL
- Producer: Hak (exec.); Jamie-James Medina (exec.); Sporting Life (also exec.); Wiki (exec.); DJ Dog Dick; Isaiah Barr; King Krule

Ratking chronology
Wiki93 (2012)	So It Goes (2014)	700-Fill (2015)

Singles from So It Goes
- 1. "Canal" Released: January 23, 2014; 2. "So Sick Stories" Released: March 18, 2014; 3. "So It Goes" Released: September 3, 2014; 4. "Snow Beach" Released: January 14, 2015

So It Goes is the only studio album by New York City hip hop group Ratking, which consisted of rappers Wiki and Hak, and producer Sporting Life. It was released on April 8, 2014 by HXC Recordings. It was entirely engineered by Young Guru. The album's title was inspired by Kurt Vonnegut's novel Slaughterhouse-Five. The album features collaborations with King Krule, Salomon Faye, and Wavy Spice. The album reached #13 on the Billboard Heatseekers Albums, #38 on Top R&B/Hip-Hop Albums, and #21 on Rap Albums.

== Reception ==
Professional ratings
Aggregate scores
Source	Rating
AnyDecentMusic?	7.2/10
Metacritic	78/100
Review scores
Source	Rating
AllMusic	4/5 stars
Exclaim!	8/10
Financial Times	4/5 stars
The Guardian	4/5 stars
Mojo	4/5 stars
NME	7/10
Pitchfork	7.5/10
Rolling Stone	3.5/5 stars
Spin	8/10
Uncut	8/10

At Metacritic, which assigns a weighted average score out of 100 to reviews from mainstream critics, So It Goes received an average score of 78 based on 19 reviews, indicating "generally favorable reviews".

Kyle Kramer of Pitchfork said: "There's a pulsing, lived-in energy to So It Goes that captures what New York feels like and pushes at the boundaries of lyrically-driven rap." So It Goes was later placed at number 200 on Pitchfork's "The 200 Best Albums of the 2010s" list.

Critic Ben Ratliff ranked So It Goes at number 5 on his "Top 10 Albums of 2014" list for The New York Times.

The album was touted as the best album of 2014 by Vice.

== Track listing ==
No.	Title	Writer(s)	Producer(s)	Length
1.	"*"	Eric Adiele; Hakeem Lewis; Patrick Morales	Sporting Life; DJ Dog Dick^{[a]}	3:57
2.	"Canal"	Adiele; Lewis; Morales	Sporting Life	3:03
3.	"Snow Beach"	Adiele; Lewis; Morales	Sporting Life; Isaiah Barr	6:42
4.	"So Sick Stories" (featuring King Krule)	Adiele; Lewis; Morales; Archie Marshall	Sporting Life; King Krule; DJ Dog Dick^{[a]}	4:42
5.	"Remove Ya"	Adiele; Lewis; Morales; Clement Dodd	Sporting Life	3:08
6.	"Eat"	Adiele; Lewis; Morales	Sporting Life; DJ Dog Dick^{[a]}	3:52
7.	"So It Goes"	Adiele; Lewis; Morales	Sporting Life	5:32
8.	"Puerto Rican Judo" (featuring Wavy Spice)	Adiele; Lewis; Morales; Destiny Nicole Ortiz	Sporting Life	4:34
9.	"Protein"	Adiele; Lewis; Morales	Sporting Life; DJ Dog Dick^{[a]}	4:53
10.	"Bug Fights"	Adiele; Lewis; Morales	Sporting Life	3:11
11.	"Take" / "Cocoa '88" (featuring Salomon Faye and DJ Dog Dick)	Adiele; Lewis; Morales; Salomon Faye; Max Eisenberg; Isaac Hayes; David Porter	Sporting Life; DJ Dog Dick^{[a]}	7:53

Notes

- ^{^a} signifies an additional producer
- "Remove Ya" and "So It Goes" contains additional vocals from Kaila Paulino

Sample credits

- "Remove Ya" contains a sample from "Never Rub a Dub" written and performed by Clement Dodd
- "Take" contains a sample from "As Long As I've Got You" written by Isaac Hayes and David Porter, and performed by The Charmels

== Charts ==
Chart	Peak position
Heatseekers Albums	13
Top R&B/Hip-Hop Albums	38
Rap Albums	21
