= URL IRL =

Single by Cities Aviv

from the album Come to Life
- Released: September 26, 2013
- Genre: Experimental hip-hop
- Length: 2:15
- Label: Young One
- Songwriter(s): Gavin Mays
- Producer(s): Cities Aviv

Cities Aviv singles chronology
"I Want It All" (2012)	"URL IRL" (2013)	"Don't Ever Look Back" (2014)

Music video
- URL IRL on YouTube

"URL IRL" is a song by American rapper Cities Aviv, released on September 26, 2013, as the lead single from his debut studio album, Come to Life. Written and produced by Cities Aviv himself, the song takes inspiration from 1980s electronic pop and dance tracks, with the song's instrumental being made out of sample chops from the era. An accompanying music video, directed by TerrorEyes, was released on December 9. The track's themes are heavily influenced by the internet and its effect on modern culture. Upon its release, "URL IRL" received positive reviews from music critics, who praised its production style, as well as Cities Aviv's vocal delivery.

== Composition ==
An upbeat and energetic song, the instrumental of "URL IRL" is made out of "hyperactive" sample chops, which are arranged in an "off-kilter" rhythm. The song has a "1980s styled bounce", and features "distorted shouts" from Cities Aviv, who shout-raps affirmations that seem to race alongside the song's beat.

In a press release for "URL IRL", Cities Aviv described the purpose of the song's name, stating that it "is a pseudonym for YOU IN REAL and I IN REAL. To be fully realized." Cities Aviv stated the track was "a dichotomy of realizations involving modern worldly existence and total eternal existence. Blindly accepting self love in the face of your mirror."

== Release ==
"URL IRL" was released as the lead single to Come to Life on September 26, 2013. An accompanying music video, directed by TerrorEyes, was released on December 9. The video opens with a shot of a boombox, where a tape is inserted, causing the song to begin playing.

== Critical reception ==
"URL IRL" received generally positive reviews from critics. Writing for Pitchfork, Jonah Bromwich described the song as "a two-minute comet of energy that's a high-concept Technicolor paean to the power of cyberexistence." He felt that the song was as "unabashedly energetic as you’d expect a celebration of online culture to be." Writing for the same publication, David Turner described "URL IRL" as one of Cities Aviv's most "immediate" songs since the track "Float On", originating from his debut mixtape Digital Lows (2011). He noted that its name, along with the names of other tracks on Come to Life, "shows Cities Aviv connecting digital dots and hashing through how it affects everyday life." Birkut of Tiny Mix Tapes praised the song's "beautifully coiled samples and attention grabbing chants". Complex's Graham felt the track was reminiscent of the "early days of hip-hop", comparing his delivery and lyricism to that of the American hip-hop group Grandmaster Flash and the Furious Five. Emilie Friedlander of The Fader felt that the song "takes Dilla-style sampling to a hyperactive, joyful, almost footwork-fast extreme", opining that "while it may only further obfuscate the enigmatic inner workings of its creator's brain, Mays' explanation of the title paints him as something of a digital era philosopher".
