= Jamie-James Medina =

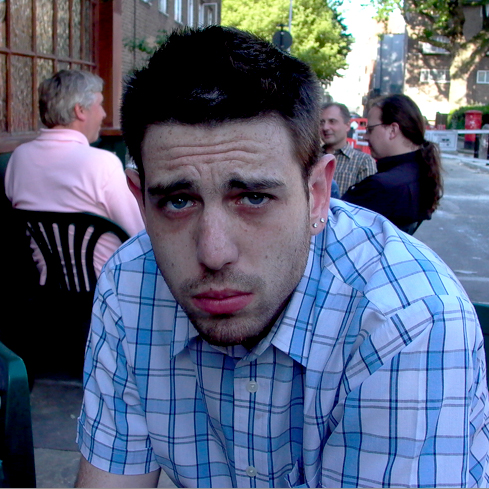
- Born: England
- Occupations: Photographer, filmmaker, record label founder
- Label: Hot Charity
- Website: www.jjmedina.com

Jamie-James Medina is a British photographer, filmmaker and record label founder. He grew up in Dhaka, Bangladesh, where his father worked as an expert in tropical medicine. Medina edits The Tourist, a limited edition newsprint publication focusing on music and travel and runs Hot Charity, an independent record label distributed by XL Recordings.

In 2010, Medina presented his American Music Legends project, a special collection of images of the last surviving greats of rock' n 'roll, blues, jazz and country, it includes portraits of Jerry Lee Lewis, Chuck Berry, Etta James and Pinetop Perkins. This was followed by the first issue of The Tourist, featuring candid photographs of The xx, taken by Medina during their 2010 world tour. In 2011, Medina directed the music video for Jamie xx & Gil Scott-Heron's "I'll Take Care Of U" . He later directed the music video for King Krule's "The Noose of Jah City". In 27 October 2011, he travelled to India with Lady Gaga, where he shot an intimate series of portraits of the singer for The Observer magazine.

Medina is a boxing fan and supporter of the NFL's Cincinnati Bengals. In 2008, a short-story he wrote detailing his personal experiences with photography and the supernatural world was turned into a feature film titled Shutter, starring Joshua Jackson as the lead character. He is credited as Executive Producer on Cerebral Ballzy's self-titled debut album after discovering Honor Titus, the group's frontman, in a New York pizza parlor in 2009.

In 2012, Medina launched Hot Charity, a Bronx-based independent record label distributed by XL Recordings. The label's first signing was Chicago-based singer songwriter Willis Earl Beal. In April 2012, Hot Charity released Beal's album "Acousmatic Sorcery". The label's second release, RATKING's WIKI93 EP, was released in November 2012.
