= HXC Recordings =

Hot Charity
- Parent company: XL Recordings
- Founded: 2012
- Founder: Jamie-James Medina
- Defunct: 2016
- Distributor(s): Beggars Group
- Genre: Various
- Country of origin: International
- Official website: www.hotcharity.com

HXC Recordings (also known as Hot Charity) was an independent record label, distributed by British record company, Beggars Group through XL Recordings.

== History ==
The label was launched in 2012 by photographer and filmmaker Jamie-James Medina. The label's first signing was Chicago outsider artist Willis Earl Beal, releasing his debut album Acousmatic Sorcery on April 2, 2012.

== Catalogue artists ==
- Duane The Teenage Weirdo
- Okay Kaya
- RATKING
- Single Mothers
- Willis Earl Beal

== Discography ==
Albums / EPs

- Willis Earl Beal "Acousmatic Sorcery" (2012)
- RATKING "Wiki93" (2012)
- Willis Earl Beal "Nobody knows." (2013)
- RATKING "So It Goes" (2014)
- Single Mothers "Negative Qualities" (2014)
- RATKING "700-Fill" (2015)

== See also ==
- List of record labels
- List of electronic music record labels
- List of independent UK record labels
