= Nasty Nigel =

Nasty Nigel may refer to:

- Nigel Lythgoe (born 1949), English television and film director and producer, television dance competition judge, and choreographer
- Nasty Nigel (rapper) (born 1989), American hip hop recording artist
