= Heavy Hearted in Doldrums =

Studio album by Antwon
- Released: May 6, 2014
- Genre: Hip-hop
- Length: 37:49
- Labels: UNIF; Nature World
- Producers: Shawn Kemp; Cities Aviv; Matrixxman; Suicideyear; Stacy; Tulip Pezley; Walsh; Lord Pusswhip; Vrong; Pictureplane; Dayfade; Ohbliv; Froskees

Antwon chronology
In Dark Denim (2013)	Heavy Hearted in Doldrums (2014)	Heavy Hearted in the Function: Depressed Teenager Remixes (2014)

Heavy Hearted in Doldrums is the debut studio album by American rapper Antwon. It was released on May 6, 2014. It features guest appearances from Lil Ugly Mane, Sad Andy, Wiki, Heems, Lakutis, and Andre Martel. Music videos were created for "Don't Care" and "Metro Nome".

== Critical reception ==
Professional ratings
Review scores
Source	Rating
CMJ	favorable
Consequence of Sound	B
Pitchfork	7.3/10
PopMatters	6/10 stars

Pat Levy of Consequence of Sound gave the album a grade of B, saying, "There are lyrics on this album that would make Prince or R. Kelly blush, but just moments later, there are lyrics that would make Leonard Cohen shed a tear." Zoe Camp of Pitchfork gave the album a 7.3 out of 10, commenting that "the rapper constructs his boldest collection yet, grounded in improved production and his characteristic schoolboy wit." Nathan Stevens of PopMatters gave the album 6 stars out of 10, stating, "It wouldn't be surprising if this becomes a crossover hit."

On May 9, 2014, Brandon Soderberg of Spin included "Cold Tears" on the "Rap Songs of the Week" list.

Gary Suarez of The Quietus named Heavy Hearted in Doldrums the 15th best hip-hop album of 2014. Drew Millard of Vice named it the 8th best album of the year.

== Track listing ==
No.	Title	Producer(s)	Length
1.	"Rain Song" (featuring Lil Ugly Mane)	Shawn Kemp	5:52
2.	"During Mimis"	Cities Aviv	2:03
3.	"Cold Tears"	Matrixxman	3:53
4.	"Don't Care" (featuring Sad Andy)	Suicideyear	4:47
5.	"Loser"	Stacy	2:04
6.	"Baby Hair"	Tulip Pezley	3:08
7.	"Mr. Intercontinental"	Walsh	3:39
8.	"Metro Nome" (featuring Wiki)	Lord Pusswhip; Vrong	2:36
9.	"KLF ELF" (featuring Heems and Lakutis)	Pictureplane	4:44
10.	"Stop"	Dayfade	1:26
11.	"Break Yo Back"	Ohbliv	1:10
12.	"143" (featuring Andre Martel)	Froskees	2:19
Total length:			37:49

== Personnel ==
Credits adapted from liner notes.

- Antwon – vocals
- Lil Ugly Mane – vocals (1)
- Shawn Kemp – production (1)
- Cities Aviv – production (2)
- Matrixxman – production (3)
- Sad Andy – vocals (4)
- Suicideyear – production (4)
- Stacy – production (5)
- Tulip Pezley – production (6)
- Walsh – production (7)
- Wiki – vocals (8)
- Lord Pusswhip – production (8)
- Vrong – production (8)
- Heems – vocals (9)
- Lakutis – vocals (9)
- Pictureplane – production (9)
- Dayfade – production (10)
- Ohbliv – production (11)
- Andre Martel – vocals (12)
- Froskees – production (12)
- Lars Stalfors – mixing
- Heba Kadry – mastering
- Scott McPherson – cover art
- Cali Thornhill DeWitt – photography
- CS – layout
