= No Mountains in Manhattan =

Studio album by Wiki
- Released: August 25, 2017
- Recorded: 2016–17; Manhattan, New York
- Genre: Hip-hop
- Length: 56:52
- Label: XL
- Producers: Wiki (also exec.); Adrian Lau; Alex Epton; Alon Sicherman; Black Mack; Dadras; DJ Earl Teklife; Kaytranada; No Life; randomblackdude; Sly C; Sporting Life; Tony Seltzer

Wiki chronology
What Happened to Fire? (2017)	No Mountains in Manhattan (2017)	Oofie (2019)

Singles from No Mountains in Manhattan
- 1. "Pretty Bull" Released: June 27, 2017; 2. "Mayor" Released: August 23, 2017; 3. "Stick Ball" Released: November 1, 2017

No Mountains in Manhattan is the debut studio album by American hip-hop recording artist Wiki. It was released on August 25, 2017, by XL Recordings. It features guest verses from Ghostface Killah, Lakutis, ACAB, Slicky Boy and Your Old Droog, and production credits for Wiki, Kaytranada, Earl Sweatshirt and Sporting Life.

== Critical reception ==
Professional ratings
Review scores
Source	Rating
The Concordian	8.5/10
Loud and Quiet	10/10
Pitchfork	8.1/10

Quinn Moreland of Pitchfork commented that "No Mountains in Manhattan would be a great record even if Wiki stuck to this urban bliss, but instead he confronts the city's shadows to build a complex portrait of himself."

=== Accolades ===
Publication	Accolade	Rank	Ref.
BrooklynVegan	Top 50 Albums of 2017	10	
Loud and Quiet	Top 40 Albums of 2017	8	
Okayplayer	Top 15 Albums of 2017	14	
Pitchfork	Top 20 Rap Albums of 2017	12	
Time Out	Top 29 Albums of 2017	19	
XXL Magazine	Top 50 Hip-Hop Albums of 2017	N/A	

== Track listing ==
No.	Title	Writer(s)	Producer(s)	Length
1.	"Islander"	Patrick Morales; Alex Epton	Epton	1:57
2.	"Mayor"	Morales; Antonio Hernandez; Epton; Arrow Brown	Tony Seltzer; Epton; Ravi Gafron	3:34
3.	"Pretty Bull"	Morales; Hernandez	Tony Seltzer	3:28
4.	"Made for This" (featuring Ghostface Killah)	Morales; Dennis Coles; Hernandez	Tony Seltzer; Adrian Lau	4:51
5.	"Chinatown Swing"	Morales; Eric Adiele	Sporting Life	3:14
6.	"Litt 15" (featuring Your Old Droog)	Morales; Fernando Arbex	DJ Earl Teklife	4:22
7.	"Face It"	Morales; Epton	Epton; Sly C	3:35
8.	"Stick Ball"	Morales	No Life	3:29
9.	"Elaine"	Morales	Wiki	2:16
10.	"Pandora’s Box" (featuring Evy Jane)	Morales; Adiele	Dadras; Sporting Life	4:25
11.	"Wiki New Written"	Morales; Thebe Kgositsile	randomblackdude	1:22
12.	"Jalo"	Morales; John Klemmer; Rob McCormack	Black Mack	3:17
13.	"Nutcrackers" (featuring Lakutis)	Morales; Aleksey Weintraub; Epton	Wiki; Alon Sicherman; Epton	4:00
14.	"Baby Girl"	Morales; Louis Celestin; Milton Nascimento; Ruy Guerra; Matthew Moore	Kaytranada	3:49
15.	"NMIM" (featuring ACAB and Slicky Boy)	Morales; Hernandez	Tony Seltzer	4:38
16.	"Leppy Coqui"	Morales; Epton; Kgositsile; Hernandez	Epton; randomblackdude; Tony Seltzer	4:35
Total length:				56:52

Sample Credits

- "Mayor" contains elements from "We Have Love" performed by The Arrows.
- "Made For This" contains elements from "Winter Go Away" performed by Holly Maxwell.
- "Litt 15" contains elements from "Never In This World" as performed by Barrabas, written by J. Arbex Miro.
- "Jalo" contains elements from "Rose Petals" written and performed by John Klemmer.
- "Wiki New Written" contains elements from "We Had True Love" performed by Hot Chocolate.
- "Baby Girl" contains elements from "Fairy Tale Song (Cadê)" performed by Milton Nascimento.
