= Come to Life (Cities Aviv album) =

Studio album by Cities Aviv
- Released: January 28, 2014
- Genre: Experimental hip hop; cloud rap
- Length: 40:20
- Label: Young One Records
- Producer: Cities Aviv; Rpld Ghsts; Blackie; Alexander Odell

Cities Aviv chronology
Black Pleasure (2012)	Come to Life (2014)	Your Discretion Is Trust (2015)

Singles from Come to Life
- 1. "URL IRL" Released: September 26, 2013; 2. "Don't Ever Look Back" Released: January 14, 2014

Come to Life is the debut studio album by American hip hop musician Cities Aviv, released through Young One Records on January 28, 2014. Cities Aviv produced eight of the album's fifteen tracks himself, with the remaining tracks produced by Rpld Ghsts, Blackie, and Alexander Odell. The album features guest appearances from Abdu Ali and Bizzarh.

The album was supported by two singles: "URL IRL", released on September 26, 2013, and "Don't Ever Look Back", released on January 14, 2014. Both tracks were supported by accompanying music videos, with the video for "URL IRL" released on December 9, 2013, and the video for "Don't Ever Look Back" released on the same day as the single.

Come to Life received generally positive reviews from music critics, who praised its production style, Cities Aviv's vocals, and the album's themes.

== Background and recording ==
Prior to Come to Life, Cities Aviv had previously released two mixtapes: Digital Lows (2011) and Black Pleasure (2012). The attention these mixtapes garnered led to him signing a deal with Young One Records, a subsidiary of Partisan Records. Cities Aviv did not want the record to be strictly any genre, steering away from the dark wave descriptor while taking inspiration from punk songs for his vocal delivery. He described the album's approach as being simultaneously masculine and feminine, stating in an interview with Fader that he intentionally sampled songs with female vocal tracks, as well as pitching up male ones, "because I feel like a lot of the themes from older songs—even if it’s a male approach to a relationship or something, the energy is very feminine, and it’s like, Oh girl, you don’t want to try to lay with me tonight? Even though that seems like a male approach, it’s very feminine in this longing for this connection."

In a November 2021 interview with Post-Trash, Cities Aviv revealed that Come to Life was the last album he had recorded inside of a recording studio:

The last record I did in a proper studio was Come to Life, which was fun. I tried to make that as homey as possible. Me and the guy would meet up, smoke some weed, and then kick it for like an hour before we would even jump into tracks. The songs would get done in 10 to 15 minutes—it was like boom, boom, boom, knocking them out. But I prefer the comfort you get from doing it in your dwelling space. The mind can travel and be relaxed and the mania can come out. Whereas if you're locked in some weird ass studio, you're subject to their rules, you know what I mean?

== Promotion and release ==
Cities Aviv released the lead single for Come to Life, "URL IRL", on September 27, 2013. According to him, the song "is a dichotomy of realizations involving modern worldly existence and total eternal existence." A music video for "URL IRL", directed by TerrorEyes, was released on December 9. Opening with a shot of a boombox, the video quickly changes to Cities Aviv himself once the song starts playing. The second single, "Don't Ever Look Back", was released alongside its music video on January 14, 2014. Directed by Rimar Villaseñor, the video features shots of Cities Aviv "flickering" in synchronization with the song, ending with him disappearing from frame. Come to Life was released on January 28, 2014, through Young One Records. On the day of its release, Cities Aviv created a mix for The Fader to support the album. A music video for the song "Worlds of Pressure" was released on December 17, 2014.

== Critical reception ==
Professional ratings
Aggregate scores
Source	Rating
Metacritic	78/100
Review scores
Source	Rating
AllMusic	4/5 stars
Colorado Daily	favorable
Pitchfork	7.3/10
Spin	8/10

At Metacritic, which assigns a weighted average score out of 100 to reviews from mainstream critics, Come to Life received an average score of 78% based on 6 reviews, indicating "generally favorable reviews".

Brandon Soderberg of Spin noted that "Burzum-esque screams tear through these noise-damaged dance-rap tracks about the pros and cons of the coming singularity." David Jeffries of AllMusic described it as "an inspired, stick-to-the-bones album that offers a surprising amount of comfort, uplift, and new opportunities."

== Track listing ==
All lyrics are written by Gavin Mays.

No.	Title	Producer(s)	Length
1.	"Intro"	Cities Aviv	2:05
2.	"Fool"	Rpld Ghsts	3:42
3.	"Head"	Cities Aviv	1:39
4.	"URL IRL"	Cities Aviv	2:14
5.	"Dissolve"	Rpld Ghsts	2:44
6.	"CTL1" (featuring Abdu Ali)	Cities Aviv	1:18
7.	"Perpetuate the Real"	Cities Aviv	2:47
8.	"Realms"	Cities Aviv	2:05
9.	"(Self 100): Know Who You Are"	Blackie	3:39
10.	"Interlude"	Cities Aviv	0:50
11.	"Vibrations"	Rpld Ghsts	2:05
12.	"(View 180): Picture Me Gone"	Alexander Odell	3:29
13.	"Still" (featuring Bizzarh)	Alexander Odell	3:39
14.	"Worlds of Pressure"	Rpld Ghsts	3:27
15.	"Don't Ever Look Back"	Cities Aviv	4:37
