= Show Me the Body =

American hardcore band

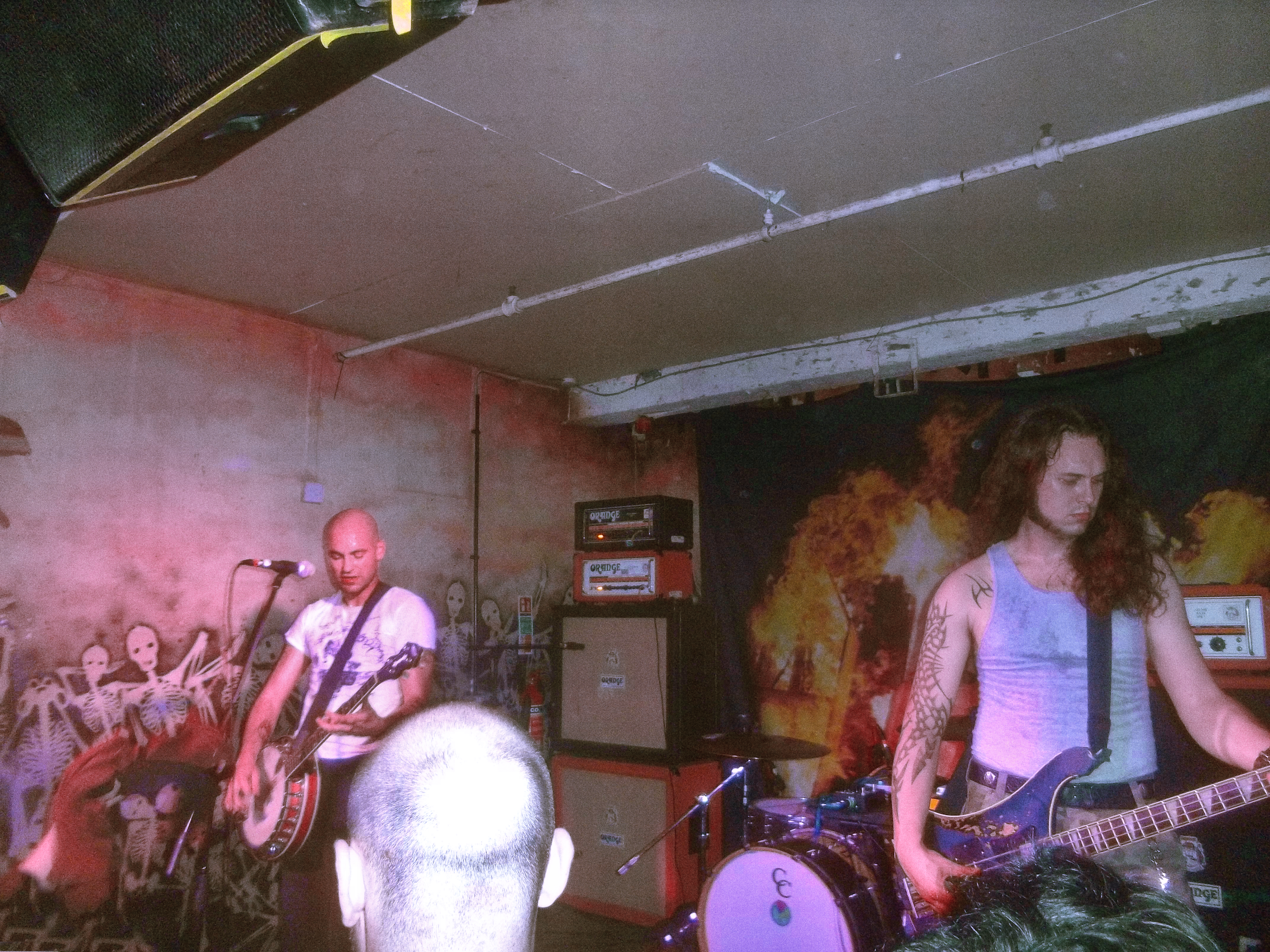
- Julian Cashwan Pratt (left) and Harlan Steed performing in 2023

Background information
- Origin: New York City, U.S.
- Genres: Post-hardcore; noise rock; hardcore punk; art punk; punk rap
- Years active: 2009–present
- Labels: Corpus; Loma Vista; Kaya Kaya; Letter Racer
- Members: Julian Cashwan Pratt; Harlan Steed; Nijol Benjamin
- Past members: Gabriel Millman; Noah Cohen-Corbett; Jack McDermott
- Website: corpus.nyc

Show Me the Body (commonly abbreviated as SMTB) is an American post-hardcore band from New York City, formed in 2009. They have released four full-length albums, each drawing influence from genres such as hip hop, noise music and sludge metal. The band currently consists of lead vocalist and banjoist Julian Cashwan Pratt, bassist Harlan Steed, and drummer Nijol Benjamin.

== History ==
=== 2009–2013: Early years ===
Julian Pratt first conceived of an early version of Show Me the Body after meeting Harlan Steed in ninth grade at Elisabeth Irwin High School. Julian became increasingly engrossed in the New York hardcore music scene when he volunteered at the Lower East Side's ABC No Rio social space, a venue that hosts daytime punk shows on Saturdays. They bonded over playing music with Pratt's cousin, their former drummer and eventual in-house producer, Gabriel Millman. They officially became Show Me the Body around a year after meeting. As a way to get up close and personal with fans, instead of clubs, their first shows were played under bridge overpasses, alleys, and in basements.

=== 2014–2015: Debut EPs ===
In 2014, formed the musical collective Letter Racer with their classmates in the group Ratking and toured with them that summer. That July saw the release of their debut EP, Yellow Kidney, independently released on SoundCloud. Their release caught the attention of record label Loma Vista which facilitated the subsequent release of their self-titled EP S M T B in April 2015. By then the band had added Noah Cohen-Corbett as drummer.

=== 2016–2017: Body War and the CORPUS collective ===
Their debut album, Body War, was released in July 2016. The album touches on themes such as anti-capitalism, gentrification and police brutality through a wide range of experimental sounds. Their collective, CORPUS, released their compilation mixtape Corpus I in March 2017.

=== 2018–2019: Dog Whistle ===
While on tour in Poland, the band visited the Auschwitz-Birkenau Memorial and Museum. This trip served as the influence for their third record, Dog Whistle, released on March 29, 2019. The album was written in Long Island City, and recorded in Los Angeles California the previous summer.

=== 2020–2021: Survive and Trouble the Water ===
Because of the COVID-19 pandemic, Show Me the Body "had to reconfigure" how they "interact with" their fans. Their reliance on live performances made this difficult, but they opted to establish a new studio space for their CORPUS collective and recorded an EP, titled Survive, which was released in March 2021. The short EP deals with themes of isolation. During this time, the band brought on drummer Jackie "Jackieboy" McDermott.

=== 2026-present: Alone Together ===
On July 10, 2026, the band released Alone Together, their fourth studio album. It received largely positive reviews.

== Artistry ==
Although primarily punk rock oriented, Show Me the Body combines the sounds and techniques of alternative hip hop, sludge metal, and noise music in order to craft an abrasive style. Their conventional instruments, such as Pratt's banjo and Steed's bass, are accompanied by an array of effects units and computer programming that form the characteristic distortion that features in much of their music. Pratt's eclectic vocal style paired with Cohen-Corbett's, and later McDermott's, aggressive drumming help complete and add weight to the band's grunge-influenced compositions.

== Band members ==
=== Current members ===
- Julian Cashwan Pratt – vocals, banjo (2009–present), programming, sampler (2013–present), guitar, synthesizer (2022–present)
- Harlan Steed – bass, synthesizer (2009–present), programming, sampler (2013–present), baritone guitar (2022–present)
- Nijol Benjamin – drums, percussion (2025–present)

=== Former members ===
- Noah Cohen-Corbett – drums, percussion, programming, sampler (2014–2020)
- Gabriel Millman – programming, sampler (2009–2022), drums, percussion (2009–2014)
- Jack "Jackie Jackieboy" McDermott – drums, percussion (2021–2025), programming, sampler (2022–2024)

== Discography ==
=== Studio albums ===
List of studio albums, with release details
Title	Album details
Body War	Released: June 17, 2016; Label: Loma Vista Recordings; Formats: digital download, CD, vinyl, streaming
Dog Whistle	Released: March 29, 2019; Label: Loma Vista Recordings; Formats: digital download, CD, vinyl, streaming
Trouble the Water	Released: October 28, 2022; Label: Loma Vista Recordings; Formats: digital download, CD, vinyl, cassette, streaming
Alone Together	Released: July 10, 2026; Label: Loma Vista Recordings; Formats: digital download, CD, vinyl, cassette, streaming

=== Mixtapes ===
List of mixtapes, with release details
Title	Album details
Corpus I	Released: March 24, 2017; Label: Loma Vista Recordings; Formats: digital download, streaming
Corpus II	Released: September 27, 2024; Label: Self-released; Formats: digital download, streaming

=== Live albums ===
List of live albums, with release details
Title	Album details
Live & Loose in the USA	Released: October 27, 2023; Label: Loma Vista Recordings; Formats: digital download, CD, vinyl, streaming

=== Extended plays ===
List of studio albums, with release details
Title	Album details
Yellow Kidney	Released: July 16, 2014; Label: Self-released; Formats: digital download
S M T B	Released: April 20, 2015; Label: Loma Vista Recordings, The Famous Letter Racer; Formats: digital download, streaming
Survive	Released: March 19, 2021; Label: Loma Vista Recordings; Formats: digital download, CD, vinyl, streaming
Trouble the Water Remixes	Released: August 31, 2023; Label: Loma Vista Recordings; Formats: digital download, streaming
Corpus II EP I	Released: July 26, 2024; Label: Self-released; Formats: digital download, streaming
Corpus II EP II	Released: September 27, 2024; Label: Self-released; Formats: digital download, streaming

=== Singles ===
List of singles as lead artist, showing year released and album name
Title	Year	Album
"Death Sounds"	2013	Non-album single
"Gross Loans"	2014	Yellow Kidney
"Steep Rock"	2014	Yellow Kidney
"Bone Soup"	2015	S M T B
"Body War"	2016	Body War
"Trash"	2017	Corpus I
"K9"	2017	Challenge Coin
"Talk"	2017	Challenge Coin
"Camp Orchestra"	2019	Dog Whistle
"Madonna Rocket"	2019	Dog Whistle
"Harder Than a Fight"	2020	Corpus Mutual Aid EP
"Survive"	2021	Survive
"Stone Cold Earth"	2021	Dark Nights: Death Metal Soundtrack
"Loose Talk"	2022	Trouble the Water
"We Came to Play"	2022	Trouble the Water
"WW4"	2022	Trouble the Water
"It Burns"	2024	Corpus II EP I
"Stomach" (featuring High Vis)	2024	Corpus II EP II
"One Train" (2025 re-recording)	2025	Non-album singles
"Sabotage" (Beastie Boys cover)	2025	Non-album singles

=== Music videos ===
List of music videos, with directors, showing year released
Title	Year	Director(s)
"Death Sounds"	2013	Show Me the Body
"Gross Loans"	2014	Aaron Naves
"Steep Rock"	2014	Show Me the Body
"One Train"	2014	Show Me the Body
"Bone Soup"	2015	Show Me the Body
"Space Faithful"	2015	Zach Hart
"Vernon" (featuring Wiki)	2015	Show Me the Body
"Six Fingers Thick"	2015	Gabriel Millman, Sam Puglia and Boaz Steed
"Body War"	2016	Show Me the Body
"Chrome Exposed"	2016	Show Me the Body
"New Language"	2016	Show Me the Body
"Ammunition"	2016	Sam E. Puglia and Show Me the Body
"2 Blood Packs"	2016	Gabriel Millman
"Trash"	2017	Asha Efia Maura
"Hungry" (with Dreamcrusher)	2017	Elijah Maura
"K9"	2017	Asha Efia and Show Me the Body
"Talk"	2017	Asha Efia and Show Me the Body
"Camp Orchestra"	2019	rubberband. and Show Me the Body
"Madonna Rocket"	2019	Show Me the Body
"Forks and Knives"	2019	Show Me the Body and Elijah Maura
"USA Lullaby"	2019	Show Me the Body and Landon Yost
"Arcanum"	2019	Show Me the Body and Landon Yost
"Survive"	2021	Julian Cashwan Pratt
"Loose Talk"	2022	Julian Cashwan Pratt
"WW4"	2022	Oliver Shahery
"Food and Plate"	2023	Dennis Wornick
"It Burns"	2024	Asha Maura and Julian Cashwan Pratt
"Stomach" (featuring High Vis)	2024	Tanner Diamond, Marley Rutherford and Show Me the Body
"Peace Corps" (featuring Alli Logout)	2024	Alli Logout
"One Train" (2025 re-recording)	2025	Asha Maura and Greg Thomas
"Sabotage" (Beastie Boys cover)	2025	Jake Hanrahan and Jonny Pickup
