= Wiki (rapper) =

American rapper (born 1993)

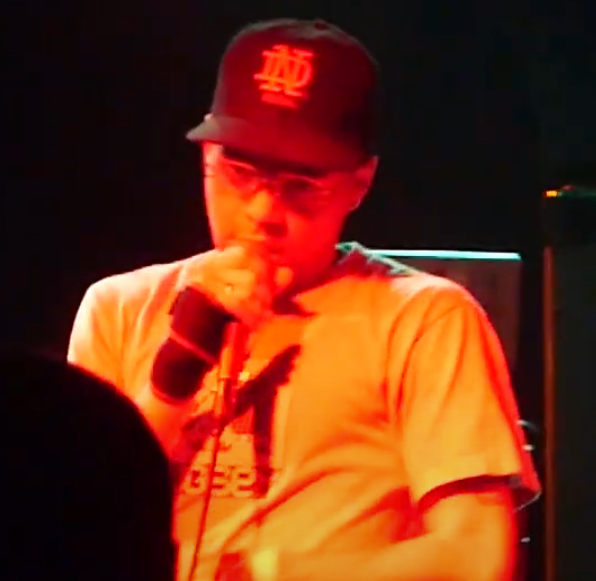
- Morales performing in 2021

Background information
- Born: October 21, 1993 (age 32); New York City, New York, U.S.
- Genre: East Coast hip-hop
- Occupations: Rapper; songwriter; record producer
- Instrument: Vocals
- Years active: 2011–present
- Labels: Wikset; Letter Racer; XL
- Formerly of: Ratking; Secret Circle
- Website: wikset.nyc

Patrick G. Morales (born October 21, 1993), better known by his stage name Wiki, is an American rapper and record producer. He was a member of New York City-based hip-hop group Ratking with rapper-producer Sporting Life and rapper Hak, which disbanded in 2016. Morales was also a member of Secret Circle with rapper Antwon and rapper-producer Lil Ugly Mane until 2018. He has since released four solo albums; No Mountains in Manhattan (2017), Oofie (2019), Half God (2021), and Ancient History (2026).

== Biography ==
Wiki was raised on the Upper West Side in Manhattan. He attended the Brooklyn Friends School, and is of Puerto Rican ancestry on his father's side and Irish-American on his mother's side. His mother grew up in suburban Westchester County, New York.

He began his music career in 2011 as a member of the New York City hip-hop group Ratking with Hak and Sporting Life. In a 2012 interview, he stated that his rap name is an allusion to Wikipedia. Wiki released his debut solo extended play 1993 on October 2, 2011. 1993 was later re-released as Ratking's debut extended play Wiki93 on November 2, 2012. Ratking released their debut single "100" on November 18, 2013. They released their debut studio album So It Goes on April 7, 2014. Ratking released their second extended play 700-Fill on March 4, 2015.

Wiki released his debut solo mixtape Lil Me on December 7, 2015. The album features guest appearances from Skepta, Mica Levi, King Krule, and many others.

Wiki and fellow rapper Your Old Droog released their collaborative extended play What Happened to Fire? on February 2, 2017. Wiki's debut solo album No Mountains in Manhattan was released months later on August 25, 2017. The album is named after a line from the 1973 Martin Scorsese film Mean Streets.

On November 8, 2019, Wiki released his second solo album, Oofie, which includes features from Lil Ugly Mane, Denzel Curry, Princess Nokia, and more.

On May 7, 2021, Wiki released a collaborative album with producer NAH titled Telephonebooth. Months later on October 1, 2021, he released the collaborative album Half God with producer Navy Blue.

On September 22, 2023, Wiki released a collaborative album, Faith Is a Rock, with rapper MIKE and producer the Alchemist. Wiki released a second collaborative album in 2023, titled 14K Figaro. The album is fully produced by Tony Seltzer, featuring guest appearances from Zelooperz and Remy Banks, among others.

Wiki made a cameo appearance in the 2025 film Marty Supreme, directed by Josh Safdie.

On June 12, 2026, Wiki released his third solo album, Ancient History, with features from Duendita, Your Old Droog and Salimata, as well as credited production from The Alchemist, Lil Ugly Mane, Navy Blue and DJ BlackPower.

== Discography ==
=== Studio albums ===
List of studio albums, with year released
Title	Album details
No Mountains in Manhattan	Released: August 25, 2017; Label: XL; Formats: Digital download, streaming, LP
Oofie	Released: November 8, 2019; Label: Wikset Ltd; Formats: Digital download, streaming, LP
Telephonebooth (with Nah)	Released: May 7, 2021; Label: Wikset Enterprise; Formats: Digital download, streaming
Half God (with Navy Blue)	Released: October 1, 2021; Label: Wikset Enterprise; Formats: Digital download, streaming
Faith Is a Rock (with Mike and the Alchemist)	Released: September 22, 2023; Label: ALC; Format: Digital download, streaming
14k Figaro (with Tony Seltzer)	Released: November 10, 2023; Label: Wikset Enterprise; Format: Digital download, streaming, LP
Ancient History	Released: June 12, 2026; Label: Wikset Enterprise; Format: Digital download, streaming

=== Extended plays ===
List of extended plays, with year released
Title	Album details
1993	Released: October 2, 2011; Label: Self-released; Formats: Digital download
What Happened to Fire? (with Your Old Droog)	Released: February 2, 2017; Label: Letter Racer Records; Formats: Digital download
One More (with MIKE and the Alchemist)	Released: November 25, 2022; Label: ALC; Formats: Digital download, streaming

=== Mixtapes ===
List of extended plays, with year released
Title	Album details
Lil Me	Released: December 7, 2015; Label: Letter Racer; Formats: Digital download, streaming
Cold Cuts (with Subjxct 5)	Released: October 21, 2022; Label: Wikset Enterprises; Formats: Digital download, streaming

=== Singles ===
==== As lead artist ====
List of singles as lead artist, showing year released and album name
Title	Year	Album
"Livin' with My Moms" (featuring Nasty Nigel)	2015	Lil Me
"Patience" (featuring Antwon)	2016	Lil Me
"3 Stories"	2016	Lil Me
"Icarus"	2017	non-album single
"Pretty Bull"	2017	No Mountains in Manhattan
"Mayor"	2017	No Mountains in Manhattan
"In the Park" (featuring Gloss Gang)	2018	non-album single
"Elixir" (featuring JJ and Obongjayar)	2018	non-album single
"Cheat Code"	2019	non-album single
"On Me"	2019	non-album single
"Eggs"	2019	non-album single
"Fee Fi Fo Fum"	2020	non-album single
"Smarty Jones"	2020	non-album single
"Cash Out"	2020	non-album single
"Uncut Gems"	2021	non-album single
"Highs and Lows" | "Highs and Lows"	2021	non-album single
"Boca to Holyoke" (featuring Papo2oo4)	2021	non-album single
"Starting Today"	2021	non-album single
"Never Know"	2021	non-album single
"Roof"	2021	Half God
"Remarkably" (with Navy Blue)	2021	Half God
"Promised" (featuring MIKE)	2021	Half God
"Can't Do This Alone"	2021	Half God
"2022 Intro"	2022	non-album single
"My Life" (with Subjxct 5)	2022	Cold Cuts
"The Fonz" (with Subjxct 5)	2022	Cold Cuts
"Mista" (with Subjxct 5)	2022	Cold Cuts

==== As featured artist ====
List of singles as a featured artist, with year released
Title	Year	Album
"Help" (Your Old Droog featuring Wiki and Edan)	2017	Packs
"Crux" (Sporting Life featuring Wiki and MIKE)	2019	non-album single
"Gelato" (Milli Merk featuring Wiki)	2019	non-album single
"Tricky" (DJ Lucas featuring Wiki)	2020	Unleashing These Bangers 4 You
"Grave or Paid" (Reed featuring Wiki and Hunnaloe)	2021	SRH
"Johnny McEnroe" (Kojaque featuring Wiki)	2023	Phantom of the Afters

=== Guest appearances ===
List of non-single guest appearances, with other performing artists, showing year released and album name
Title	Year	Artist(s)	Album
"Octopus" (Remix)	2012	King Krule, Hak	non-album single
"Stikkin"	2013	Lofty305, Jerry Dub	Incum
"In Hell"	2013	Lofty305, Jerry Dub, Ruben Slikk, Londo	Incum
"Neptune Estate" (Remix)	2014	King Krule, Lucki Eck$	non-album single
"Metronome"	2014	Antwon	Heavy Hearted in Doldrums
"Stackin' Skins"	2014	Trash Talk, King Krule	No Peace
"That's Not Me" (US Remix)	2014	Skepta	non-album single
"Blockbuster Night, Pt. 2"	2014	Run the Jewels, Despot	Run the Jewels 2
"Pain Killers"	2014	Little Pain, Lofty305, Kool A.D., Antwon	L.I.T.T.L.E.
"AM // Radio"	2015	Earl Sweatshirt	I Don't Like Shit, I Don't Go Outside
"Squad Deep"	2015	Antwon, Lee Spielman	non-album single
"Vernon"	2015	Show Me the Body	S M T B
"Sexy Boy"	2015	Mike Dece, Speak!, Fat Tony	Rich Slut
"Monday"	2015	Caleb Stone, Mike Dece, Speak!	Sex Quest 3
"Popcorn"	2015	Marvel Alexander	Don't Die Yet
"Fill Em In"	2015	Jaguar Pyramids	Jaguar Pyramids
"Complex City Cypher"	2016	Christian Scott, Your Old Droog, A$AP Ferg	non-album single
"Heart"	2016	ZelooperZ	Bothic
"Facts"	2016	Yung Gutted	Internet Graveyard III
"Saggy Denim"	2016	Princess Nokia	1992
"Nothing to Hide"	2016	Sporting Life, Devonté Hynes	Slam Dunk Vol. III
"U Know Wat It Is"	2016	DJ Lucas, Luiego	Till Death Do Us Part I
"Standout"	2017	MIKE, Chip Skylark	May God Bless Your Hustle
"Help"	2017	Your Old Droog, Edan	PACK
"Saggy Denim"	2017	Princess Nokia	1992 Deluxe
"Hook Chop"	2017	Nick Hook, DJ Earl	50 Backwoods
"Mountains of Gold"	2018	Richard Russell, Sampha, Kamasi Washington, Ibeyi	Everything Is Recorded by Richard Russell
"Ocean Floor"	2018	Junglepussy	JP3
"Small Colleges (Stay with Me)"	2019	DJ Shadow	Our Pathetic Age
"Vigilantes - Bonus Remix"	2019	Your Old Droog	Transportation
"and more."	2019	Remy Banks	did this in detroit.
"Who This?"	2019	Michul Kuun	Great (Then After Awhile, It Didn't Mean Anything to Them)
"Cash Out"	2020	Tony Seltzer, A Lau	Avenues
"As Above So Below"	2020	ANKHLEJOHN	As Above So Below
"Blood Covered Tiles"	2021	Tony Seltzer	Hey Tony
"triboro."	2021	Remy Banks	the phantom of paradise.
"Fly Away"	2021	Antwon	Balikbayan Box
"Metro Card God"	2021	Antwon	Balikbayan Box
"No Time"	2021	Your Old Droog	TIME
"Golden Green"	2022	Emma-Jean Thackray	Yellow (Deluxe)
"Big Pharma"	2023	Radamiz, Dom McLennon	Gnashing, Teeth
