= Single Mothers (band) =

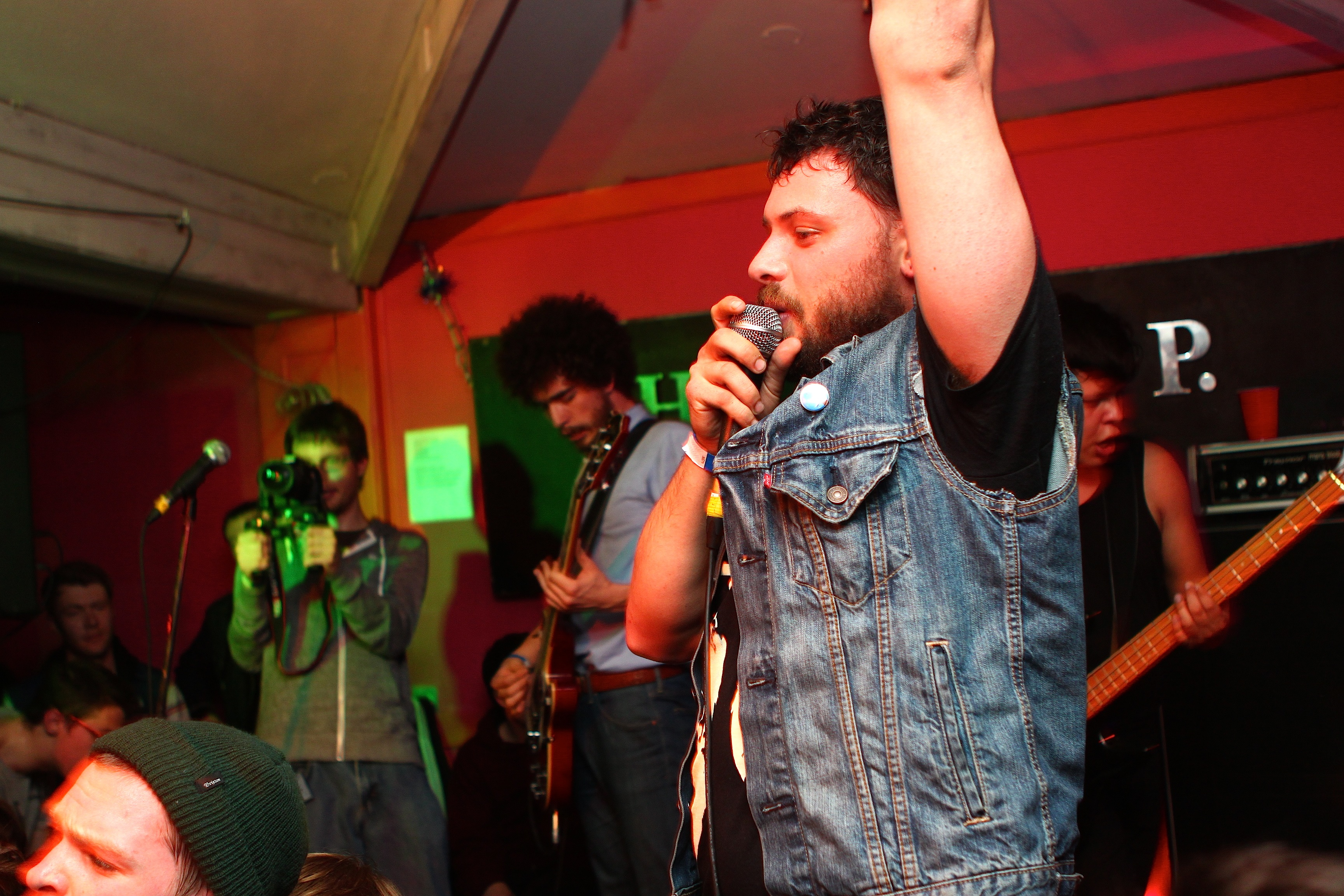

Background information
- Origin: London, Ontario, Canada
- Genres: Punk rock, post-hardcore, alternative rock, hardcore punk
- Years active: 2008–present
- Labels: Hot Charity, Dine Alone, Secret Voice, Big Scary Monsters
- Website: singlemothersband.bandcamp.com

Single Mothers is a Canadian punk rock band that formed in London, Ontario in 2008. The band released its debut studio album Negative Qualities in 2014.

== History ==
Canadian Andrew Thomson formed Single Mothers in 2008 after a breakup. The band released two EPs in its early years, Wild Party in 2010 and Single Mothers in 2011, the latter of which was released through Secret Voice — an imprint of Jacob Bannon's Deathwish Inc. founded by Jeremy Bolm of Touché Amoré. Its self-titled EP was promoted with music videos for "Christian Girls" and "Baby". Single Mothers headlined a US tour in June–August 2012 and supported Pianos Become the Teeth and Title Fight in October–November 2012.

Thomson quit Single Mothers in 2011 to prospect for gold in Swastika, Ontario. His father noticed that his son was "drinking too much and hanging with the wrong people in [London, Ontario]" and proposed the idea that he should prospect for gold with his extended family instead. Thomson commented: "I was going to go up there for only a couple months, but I ended up loving it and stayed for three years." During his time away from the band, Thomson also started writing and recording some solo material. In 2013, he released a four-song EP titled Honesty is a Confidence Problem through Secret Voice, and a two-song self-titled EP (under the name Drew Thomson) through No Sleep Records in 2014. Though he later returned to Single Mothers, he intends to continue his solo career and prospect for gold. Thomson released a new solo EP under his new project 'The Drew Thomson Foundation' in 2018 through Dine Alone Records titled Stay.

In 2013, Thomson reunited with Single Mothers and the band began working on its debut studio album. The members teamed up with producer Joby J. Ford of the punk rock band The Bronx and initially recorded at his own Big Game Lodge Studio in Los Angeles, California, but later recorded in Toronto, London and New York. The band also toured North America in support of Quicksand's reunion tour in January 2013, the UK in support of The Bronx in February 2013, various US dates in March 2013 and the east coast US with A Wilhelm Scream. After two years of work, Single Mothers released its debut studio album Negative Qualities on Hot Charity on October 7, licensing the record in Canada to Dine Alone Records. The band promoted the album with an online stream of the track "Marbles" in August 2014 and a supporting North American tour August–October 2014. A music video for "Half-Lit" released the day after the North American release of the album. Negative Qualities went on to be nominated for a Juno in Canada. In 2017 the band released their second full-length Our Pleasure through Dine Alone Records in North America and Big Scary Monsters in the UK/EU. It was promoted with videos for the tracks 'Leash' and 'People Are Pets'. Single Mothers went on tour supporting Touché Amoré in the fall of 2017.

== Lyrics ==
Vocalist Andrew Thomson's lyrics take the stance of an outsider-looking-in and cover topics such as religion, small-town life, drugs, alcohol, sex and relationships, and pretentious people. In his review of "Christian Girls," Ian Cohen of Pitchfork noted several music themes within the one song, commenting: "In the span of 142 seconds, Andrew Thomson projects his frustration onto concepts vast enough to make it a fair fight, but he can't find a single suitable explanation for his inability to get some after tearing down the entire courtship process ('This ain't a date, it's just coffee!'), human vanity ('Jealousy's attention to the ones who can get it/ Something like coming in second') and organized religion ('I thought it's 'cause she's a Christian/ Turns out the girl just wasn't with it')." Thomson's vocal style was influenced by Bear vs. Shark, The Hold Steady, The Replacements, The Streets and Conor Oberst.

== Band members ==
By 2013, Single Mothers had "been through no fewer than 16 members."

=== Current members ===
- Andrew Thomson (vocals)
- Brandon Jagersky (drums)
- Riley Simpson (bass)
- Daniel Ormsby (guitar)

=== Former Members ===
==== Guitarists ====
- Brett Chabot
- Jesse Gongora
- Micheal Peterson
- Peter Van Helvoort (touring)
- Travis Getty
- Luke Bentham (touring)
- Justis Krarr
- Daniel Ormsby
- Dave Nardi (touring)
- Pat Briggs (touring)
- Emmett O'Riley

==== Bassists ====
- Alejandro Correal
- Dylan Smith
- Evan Redsky
- Kyle Holmes
- Ross Miller
- Dave Nardi (touring)
- Riley Simpson
- Leevon Sharrow
- Bobby Calwell

==== Drummers ====
- Andrew Brown
- Matt Bouchard-Friend
- Tim Nicodemo
- Micheal Peterson
- Travis Sharrow
- Riley Simpson (touring)
- Peter Landi
- Ross Chorny (touring)
- Ian Romano
- Brandon Jagersky

== Discography ==
=== Studio albums ===
- Negative Qualities (2014, Hot Charity, Dine Alone)
- Our Pleasure (2017, Dine Alone, Big Scary Monsters)
- Through a Wall (2018, Dine Alone, Big Scary Monsters)
- Everything You Need (2022, Dine Alone)
- Roy (2023, Dine Alone)

=== EPs ===
- Wild Party (2010, self-released)
- Single Mothers (2011, Secret Voice)
- Meltdown (2016, self-released, re-released 2017, Dine Alone)
- Bubble (2020, self-released and removed from bandcamp)
- No Idea Head (2020, self-released)

=== Singles ===
- "East Van Band Van" b/w "Night School" (2017, self-released)
- "Skylight b/w Army Green" (2017, Dine Alone)
- "Metropolis" (2019, Dine Alone)
- "Nihilist Headlights" (2019, Dine Alone)
- "Head Shrunk / Sad Dumb Game" (2023, Dine Alone)

=== Music videos ===
- "Christian Girls" (2012)
- "Baby" (2012)
- "Half-Lit" (2014)
- "Feel Shame/ Patricide" (2015)
- "People are Pets" (2017)
- "Leash" (2017)
- "Dog Parks x Switch Off" (2018)
- "Tan Line (Like Passing Through A Wall)" (2018)
- "Metropolis" (2019)
- "Nihilist Headlights" (2019)
