= Half God =

Studio album by Wiki
- Released: October 1, 2021
- Genre: Hip-hop
- Length: 59:55
- Label: Wikset Enterprise
- Producer: Navy Blue

Wiki chronology
Telephonebooth (2021)	Half God (2021)	Cold Cuts (2023)

Half God is the third studio album by American rapper Wiki. It is entirely produced by American rapper and record producer Navy Blue. The album was released on October 1, 2021, via Wiki's Wikset Enterprise label. Writing of the album began in November 2020 with "All I Need."

== Critical reception ==
Professional ratings
Aggregate scores
Source	Rating
Metacritic	84/100
Review scores
Source	Rating
AllMusic	4/5 stars
Beats per Minute	78%
Pitchfork	8.5/10
Robert Christgau	A−

At Metacritic, which assigns a weighted average score out of 100 to reviews from professional critics, the album received an average score of 84, based on 5 reviews, indicating "universal acclaim".

=== Accolades ===
Half God on year-end lists
Publication	List	Rank	Ref.
Paste	The 50 Best Albums of 2021	45	
Pitchfork	The 50 Best Albums of 2021	31	

== Track listing ==
All tracks produced by Navy Blue.

No.	Title	Writer(s)	Length
1.	"Not Today"	Patrick Morales; Sage Elsesser	2:37
2.	"Roof"	Morales; Elsesser	3:05
3.	"Remarkably"	Morales; Elsesser	3:56
4.	"Can't Do This Alone" (featuring Navy Blue)	Morales; Elsesser	2:43
5.	"Never Fall Off"	Morales; Elsesser	3:37
6.	"Drug Supplier" (featuring Jesse James Solomon)	Morales; Jesse Solomon Willis; Elsesser	3:42
7.	"Wik da God"	Morales; Elsesser	4:36
8.	"Ego Death"	Morales; Elsesser	3:29
9.	"The Business"	Morales; Elsesser	4:18
10.	"Home"	Morales; Elsesser	2:32
11.	"All I Need" (featuring Earl Sweatshirt)	Morales; Thebe Kgositsile; Elsesser	2:49
12.	"Gas Face" (featuring Remy Banks)	Morales; Remy Banks; Elsesser	4:09
13.	"Promised" (featuring MIKE)	Morales; Michael Bonema; Elsesser	3:00
14.	"New Truths"	Morales; Elsesser	4:57
15.	"Still Here" (featuring duendita)	Morales; Candace Camacho; Elsesser	4:54
16.	"Grape Soda"	Morales; Elsesser	4:21
Total length:			59:55
