= Salomon Faye =

- Also known as: Immortal
- Born: Salomon Faye; 1993 (age 32–33); Paris, Île-de-France, France
- Origin: New York City, United States
- Genre: Hip hop
- Occupations: Rapper; songwriter
- Instrument: Vocals
- Years active: 2008–present
- Label: Illuzion Entertainment

Salomon Faye (born 1993 in Paris, Île-de-France) is a French-American hip hop recording artist and songwriter from New York City, New York.

== Discography ==
=== Extended plays ===
List of extended plays, with year released
Title	Album details
Stimulation	Released: April 28, 2015; Label: The illUZiON; Formats: digital download

=== Singles ===
==== As lead artist ====
List of singles as lead artist, with showing year released and album name
Title	Year	Album
"Black Power"	2015	none-album single
"W.T.F."	2015	Stimulation

==== As featured artist ====
List of singles as featured artist, with showing year released and album name
Title	Year	Album
"Freak" (JIL featuring Salomon Faye)	2016	non-album single

=== Guest appearances ===
List of non-single guest appearances, with other performing artists, showing year released and album name
Title	Year	Artist(s)	Album
"Take"	2014	Ratking	So It Goes
"Kundalini"	2016	Hodgy	Fireplace: TheNotTheOtherSide
