= Motormouthmedia =

- Company type: Public Relations
- Headquarters: Los Angeles, CA, United States
- Key people: Judy Miller Silverman, Owner
- Website: Motormouthmedia

Motormouthmedia is a public relations firm based in Los Angeles. The company's roster includes acts such as Dirty Projectors, Animal Collective, Deerhunter, and Flying Lotus. Judy Miller Silverman has been the owner of the company since 1997.
