= Trouble the Water (album) =

Studio album by Show Me the Body
- Released: October 28, 2022
- Recorded: 2022
- Studio: Corpus Studios
- Genre: Hardcore punk
- Length: 38:01
- Language: English
- Label: Loma Vista
- Producer: Arthur Rizk; Show Me the Body

Show Me the Body chronology
Survive (2021)	Trouble the Water (2022)	Alone Together (2026)

Trouble the Water is the third full-length studio album by American hardcore punk band Show Me the Body, released by Loma Vista Recordings on October 28, 2022.

== Reception ==
Professional ratings
Aggregate scores
Source	Rating
AnyDecentMusic?	7.4/10 (8 reviews)
Metacritic	83/100 (5 reviews)
Review scores
Source	Rating
Gigwise	7/10 stars
The Guardian	4/5 stars
Kerrang!	4/5
Pitchfork	7.8/10
PopMatters	8/10

Editors at AnyDecentMusic? rated this album a 7.4 out of 10, based on eight reviews. Trouble the Water received positive reviews from critics noted at review aggregator Metacritic. It has a weighted average score of 85 out of 100, based on eight reviews.

Writing for Gigwise, Cian Kinsella gave this release 7 out of 10 stars, calling it "a good listen from start to finish" but complaining of a "breakdown of communication somewhere between the band and the listener" where the band does not commit fully to experimental rock or hardcore punk. The Guardian's Safi Bugel rated Trouble the Water 4 out of 5 stars for being a "cathartic release from volatile times" that blends musical genres. In Kerrang!, Luke Morton rated this album 4 out of 5, distinguishing the band from other hardcore acts, summing up "although it might not set your mosh muscles alight like the coffins on its cover, SMTB have improved their genre-exploring recipe with deeper flavours, keeping you coming back for more". Adlan Jackson of Pitchfork rated this work a 7.8 out of 10, calling it "adventurous" and noting recurring themes of aggression in gentrification, violence, and war. Andrew Spiess of PopMatters rated Trouble the Water an 8 out of 10, calling the band "admirable" and "as thoughtful and provocative as they are productive, as angry as they are respectful, [with] music and community-building is their chosen mode of focusing tension". Editors of Stereogum chose this for Album of the Week, with critic James Rettig writing that the music may be "corny", but it is "also impossibly effective, an alchemical combination of potent, apocalyptic sounds".

== Track listing ==
1. "Loose Talk" – 3:26
2. "Food from Plate" – 2:51
3. "Radiator" – 2:32
4. "We Came to Play" – 2:15
5. "War Not Beef" – 3:47
6. "Out of Place" – 3:54
7. "Boils Up" – 4:01
8. "Buck 50" – 2:32
9. "Demeanor" – 3:00
10. "Using It" – 2:16
11. "WW4" – 3:42
12. "Trouble the Water" – 3:45

== Personnel ==
Credits are adapted from Tidal.

=== Show Me the Body ===
- Julian Cashwan Pratt – vocals, banjo, guitar, synthesizer, production
- Jack McDermott – drums, production
- Harlan Steed – baritone guitar, bass guitar, samples, synthesizer, production

=== Additional personnel ===
- Arthur Rizk – guitar, production, recording, mixing, mastering
- Aidan Elias – recording assistance
- Will Calhoun – timbales on "Radiator"

== See also ==
- Lists of 2022 albums
