= Nasty Nigel (rapper) =

American rapper

- Born: Nigel Joshua Reynoso; September 27, 1989 (age 36); New York City, New York, U.S.
- Origin: Corona, Queens, New York City, New York, U.S.
- Genres: Hip hop
- Occupation: Rapper
- Instrument: Vocals
- Years active: 2009–present
- Label: Fool's Gold

Nigel Joshua Reynoso (born September 27, 1989), known professionally as Nasty Nigel, is an American rapper from Corona, Queens. His debut solo extended play (EP) El Utimo Playboy: La Vida Y Los Tiempos De Nigel Rubirosa was released in 2016.

== Discography ==
=== Extended plays ===
List of extended plays, with year released
Title	Album details
El Utimo Playboy: La Vida Y Los Tiempos De Nigel Rubirosa	Released: July 25, 2016; Label: Self-released; Formats: Digital download, cassette

=== with World's Fair ===
Studio albums

- Bastards of the Party (2013)

=== with Children of the Night ===
Mixtapes

- Where the Wild Things Are (2009)
- Yes or No (2010)
- Queens... Revisited (2012)

=== Guest appearances ===
List of guest appearances, with other performing artists, showing year released and album name
Title	Year	Artist(s)	Album
"Leverage"	2012	Hot Sugar, Kool A.D., Fat Tony, Lakutis	MiDi Murder
"Nasty Dwarf"	2012	Prince Samo, Lansky Jones	Street Viceroy
"56k" (Remix)	2013	Hot Sugar, Big Baby Gandhi, Lansky Jones, Antwon, Chippy Non-Stop, Lakutis, DVS, Kitty, Ness	—N/a
"Rem"	2015	Remy Banks	Higher
"Leverage"	2015	Kool A.D., Fat Tony, Lakutis	O.K.
"Livin' with My Moms"	2015	Wiki	Lil Me
"Wedding Cake"	2016	Hannibal King	Don't Die
"+3"	2016	Nick Hook, DJ Rashad, DJ Paypal	Relationships
"Lovesong"	2016	Nick Hook	Relationships
"The Infinite Loop"	2016	Nick Hook, DJ Rashad, Chino Moreno	Relationships
"Pine"	2017	Remy Banks	Champ Hoody Music Ep. 1
