= Willis Earl Beal =

American singer-songwriter

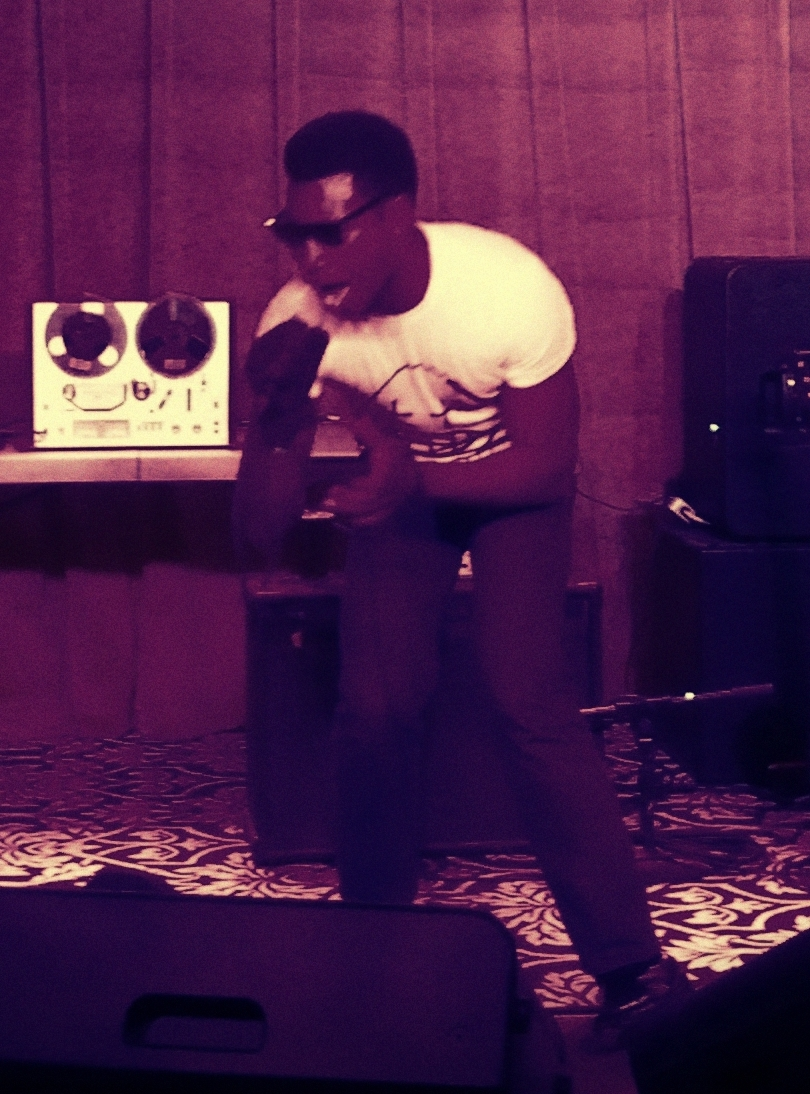
- Beal performing in 2012

Background information
- Born: Chicago, Illinois, U.S.
- Genres: Lo-fi, folk, experimental, R&B, soul, gospel, blues
- Occupations: Musician; recording artist; music producer; visual artist; writer; actor
- Instruments: Vocals; iPod; compact disc player; 8 track cassette player; portable p.a.; synthesizer/keyboards; guitars; bass; harmonica
- Labels: Tender Loving Empire; The Minimal Beat; cdbaby; PIAPTK; Eyeless Records
- Website: www.travelingeyes.net

Willis Earl Beal (also known as Nobody) is an artist and musician.

== Early years ==
Willis Earl Beal was born on the south side of Chicago, Illinois. In his early twenties Beal joined the U.S. Army, moving to Fort Leonard Wood, Missouri. Beal was medically discharged from the army due to intestinal and visual problems. He then returned to Chicago where he worked at Sears Tower, following a five-month hospital stay.

== Early career ==
In 2007, Beal moved to Albuquerque, New Mexico. Here Beal spent some time homeless, and working entry-level jobs, notably as a night-shift security guard. During this time Beal began to record music, leaving CD-Rs in public spaces around Albuquerque. Beal would also leave self-illustrated flyers around the town in the hope of finding a girlfriend. One of these flyers was discovered by Found Magazine who put Beal on the cover of their magazine. Found later released a limited-edition box set called The Willis Earl Beal Collection, which included Beal's poetry, artwork and a 17-song album. Through these flyers and the subsequent coverage in Found, Beal was contacted by more than 100 members of the public.

== Music career ==
Beal participated in auditions for Simon Cowell's The X Factor television show, but dropped out of the "boot-camp" stage of the competition. In 2012, Beal signed a recording contract with Hot Charity, an imprint of independent record label, XL Recordings. Beal's first single for the labels, "Evening's Kiss" was released on February 17, 2012, and the accompanying music video was illustrated by Beal. Beal's debut album, entitled Acousmatic Sorcery was released on April 2, 2012. In 2013, Beal was the star and subject of the musical drama film, Memphis, directed by Tim Sutton. The film screened at the Venice Film Festival and Sundance, and was distributed theatrically through Kino Lorber in 2014.

== Discography ==
Albums

- Acousmatic Sorcery (Hot Charity/XL Recordings, 2012)
- Nobody Knows. (Hot Charity/XL Recordings, 2013)
- Experiments in Time (self-released, 2014)
- Experiments in Time: The Golden Hour (self-released, 2014)
- Noctunes (Electric Soul Records/Tender Loving Empire, 2015)
- Turn (cdbaby/TMB Limited, 2017)
- Turn, Circle, Sun & Moon (cdbaby, TMB Limited 2017)
- ALMS (Bandcamp, cdbaby 2018)
- Morningstar (Bandcamp, Eyeless Records 2020)
- ANTISTAR (Eyeless Records 2025)

EPs

- Principles of a Protagonist (BitTorrent, 2012)
- A Place That Doesn't Exist (self-released, 2013)
- Curious Cool (self-released, 2014)
- Hourglass(Bandcamp,2021)
- Blue Dawn(Bandcamp, Eyeless Records,2021)
- Flying So Low / 12 Midnight (TMB Limited, 7", 2015)
- Through The Dark (Tender Loving Empire, 2016)
- A Chaos Paradigm (Tender Loving Empire, 2016)
- Circle (self-released, 2017)
- Sun & Moon (self-released, 2017)
- Sad Sam (Extended Player) (self-released, 2018)
- "Feel/You" (7" single, 2017)
- "Don't You (Forget About Me)" (cover)
- "3 ANGELS" (collaboration with Druidance)
