= Joy Guidry =

American composer and bassoonist (born 1995)

Background information
- Born: Houston, Texas, United States
- Genres: Jazz; experimental; ambient
- Occupation: Composer
- Instrument: Bassoon
- Label: Whited Sepulchre Records
- Website: guidrybassoon.com

Joy Guidry is an American bassoonist and composer.

== Early life ==
Guidry was born in Houston and first became interested in music through her exposure to gospel music at church.

== Career ==
Guidry graduated from the Peabody Institute in 2018 with a bachelor's degree in bassoon performance, after which she participated in a fellowship at the Banff Centre for Arts and Creativity. She earned a diploma from Mannes School of Music the following year.

In 2021, Guidry was awarded the Berlin Prize for Young Artists for her Radical Self-Love program. Her debut album, Radical Acceptance, was released in February 2022. That year, she served on a panel of curators to select projects from new artists to be recorded on the American Composers Forum innova Recordings label.

Guidry is currently pursuing a doctoral degree in music at University of California, San Diego. After touring with her dissertation project, AMEN, a recording of the work will be released in May 2024.

=== Compositions ===
==== Y'all don't wanna listen ====
In 2020, the National Sawdust Ensemble commissioned and premiered Y'all don't wanna listen, a work by Guidry for cello, alto flute, and violin.

==== A Prayer for Protection ====
A Prayer for Protection, a work for seven double basses, was commissioned by the New World Symphony for 2021–2022 BLUE project bass fellows.

==== This just don't make no sense ====
Guidry's "mini-opera" for soprano, double bass, and oboe, This just don't make sense was commissioned by the Long Beach Opera for a virtual performance by the ensemble in November 2020.

==== They know what they've done to us ====
Titled after a 1968 quote from activist Fannie Lou Hamer, They Know What They've Done To Us was commissioned by the I&I Foundation and premiered at the 2022 Lucerne Festival, where it was performed by trumpet player Aaron Akugbo and pianist Zeynep Özsuca.

== Personal life ==
Guidry is Christian and queer. Her 2022 work Radical Acceptance explores her journey with bipolar disorder and post-traumatic stress disorder.

== Discography ==
=== Albums ===
List of albums, with selected details
Title	Details
Radical Acceptance	Released: February 4, 2022; Format: Digital download, vinyl
AMEN	Release: May 10, 2024; Format: Digital download, vinyl; Label: Whited Sepulchre Records

=== Singles ===
List of singles with selected details
Title	Year	Album
"Almost There"	2023	Non-album single
"Day By Day"	2023	AMEN
