= Oofie =

2019 studio album by Wiki

Studio album by Wiki
- Released: November 8, 2019
- Genre: Alternative hip-hop
- Length: 43:37
- Label: Wikset Ltd
- Producers: Alex Epton; Sadhugold; Roofeeo; Tony Seltzer; Lil Ugly Mane; Sporting Life; Laron; Micachu; NYOP; Jonti; Faze Miyake

Wiki chronology
No Mountains in Manhattan (2017)	Oofie (2019)	Telephonebooth (2021)

Oofie (stylized in all caps) is the second studio album by American rapper Wiki. It was released on November 8, 2019, by his own independent label Wikset.

It features guest appearances from Denzel Curry, Princess Nokia, Your Old Droog, Lil Ugly Mane, Duendita, and Lansky Jones.

== Track listing ==
No.	Title	Writer(s)	Producer(s)	Length
1.	"Intro"	Alex Epton; Ben Vernon; Patrick Morales; SadhuGold	SadhuGold; Alex Epton; Nah^{[a]}	2:02
2.	"Downfall"	Epton; Jahphet Landis; Michul Kuun; Morales	Alex Epton; Roofeeo; Nah	2:30
3.	"Pesto"	Antonio Hernández; Morales	Tony Seltzer	2:48
4.	"Grim" (featuring Denzel Curry and Lil Ugly Mane)	Epton; Denzel Curry; Morales; Travis Miller	Travis Miller; Alex Epton; Nah^{[a]}	4:23
5.	"Vidal" (interlude)	Epton; Carlos Hernandez; Mevlin Honore; Morales	Alex Epton; Nah^{[a]}	1:31
6.	"4 Clove Club"	Epton; Hernández; Eric Adiele; Isaac Sleator; Kuun; Morales	Sporting Life; Alex Epton^{[a]}; Tony Seltzer^{[a]}; Nah^{[a]}	3:12
7.	"The Act"	Jasper Marsalis; Morales	Slauson Malone	1:58
8.	"Way That I Am" (featuring Your Old Droog)	Morales; SadhuGold; Your Old Droog	Sadhugold	5:06
9.	"Back Then" (featuring Lansky Jones)	Epton; Hernández; Kuun; Laron Wages; Lansky Jones; Morales	Tony Seltzer; Laron; Alex Epton^{[a]}; Nah^{[a]}	3:33
10.	"The Routine"	Epton; Landis; Morales	Roofeeo; Alex Epton^{[a]}; Nah^{[a]}; Matt Lubansky^{[a]}	2:33
11.	"Dame Aquí" (featuring Princess Nokia)	Hernández; Destiny Frasqueri; Mica Levi; Morales	Rob Mack; Alex Epton; Micachu; Tony Seltzer	3:39
12.	"NYOPxTONY" (interlude)	Hernández; NYOP; Morales	Tony Seltzer; NYOP; Nah^{[a]}	1:52
13.	"Promises" (featuring duendita)	Epton; duendita; Jonti Danilewitz; Morales	Jonti; Alex Epton^{[a]}	5:02
14.	"Freaks"	Epton; Hernandez; Faze Miyake; Ghostdaddy; Isaiah Barr; Morales	Alex Epton; Faze Miyake^{[a]}; Nah ^{[a]}	3:30
Total length:				43:37

^{[a]} signifies an additional producer

- "Intro" features additional vocals by Ben Vernon

== Personnel ==
Credits adapted from Bandcamp

- Wiki - primary artist, vocals
- Alex Epton - producer (1, 2, 4–6, 9–14), congas (5), synth (14)
- SadhuGold - producer (1, 8)
- Nah - producer (1, 2, 4, 5, 6, 9, 10, 12, 14)
- Ben Vernon - additional vocals (1)
- Roofeeo - producer (2, 10)
- Tony Seltzer - producer (3, 6, 9, 11, 12)
- Denzel Curry - featured artist (4)
- Travis Miller - featured artist (4), producer (4)
- Melvin Hodore - bass (5)
- Carlos Hernandez - synth (5), piano (14)
- Sporting Life - producer (6)
- Isaac Sleator - piano (6)
- Slauson Malone - producer (7)
- Your Old Droog - featured artist (8)
- Lansky Jones - featured artist (9)
- Laron - producer (9)
- Matt Lubansky - producer (10)
- Rob Mack - producer (11)
- Micachu - producer (11)
- NYOP - producer (12)
- duendita - featured artist (13)
- Jonti - producer (13)
- Faze Miyake - producer (14)
- Isaiah Barr - saxophone (14)
- Ghostdaddy - sitar (14)
