= 700-Fill =

Mixtape by Ratking
- Released: March 4, 2015
- Recorded: 2014−15
- Genre: Alternative hip hop
- Length: 37:52
- Label: Self-released
- Producer: Sporting Life

Ratking chronology
So It Goes (2014)	700-Fill (2015)

700-Fill is the only mixtape by New York City hip hop group Ratking, which consisted of rappers Wiki and Hak, and producer Sporting Life. The album was self-released on March 4, 2015 via BitTorrent and was entirely produced by Sporting Life. It features guest appearances from Remy Banks, Despot, and Princess Nokia, among others.

== Background ==
On October 7, 2015, the music video for "Arnold Palmer" was released.

== Track listing ==
- All songs are produced by Sporting Life

No.	Title	Length
1.	"American Gods" (featuring Remy Banks, Teddy, and Slicky Boy)	4:18
2.	"Arnold Palmer"	4:24
3.	"Bethel"	5:07
4.	"Eternal Reveal"	3:02
5.	"Flurry"	3:51
6.	"Lepane Lane" (featuring Slicky Boy)	3:38
7.	"Steep Tech" (featuring Despot and Princess Nokia)	4:03
8.	"Sticky Trap"	4:48
9.	"Makeitwork"	4:37
Total length:		37:52
