= Acousmatic Sorcery =

Studio album by Willis Earl Beal
- Released: April 2, 2012
- Recorded: 2010–2011
- Genre: Lo-fi, outsider, soul, blues
- Length: 45:01
- Label: Hot Charity/XL Recordings
- Producer: Willis Earl Beal

Professional ratings
Aggregate scores
Source	Rating
AnyDecentMusic?	7.3/10
Metacritic	70/100
Review scores
Source	Rating
AllMusic	4/5 stars
The A.V. Club	A-
Clash	8/10
Exclaim!	9/10
The Guardian	2/5 stars
NME	3.5/5 stars
The Observer	4/5 stars
Pitchfork	7.2/10
PopMatters	5/10 stars
Spin	8/10

Acousmatic Sorcery is the debut album by Chicago singer-songwriter Willis Earl Beal, released on April 2, 2012 by Hot Charity/XL Recordings.

== Track listing ==
All lyrics are written by Willis Earl Beal; all music is composed by Willis Earl Beal.

No.	Title	Length
1.	"Nepenenoyka"	1:48
2.	"Take Me Away"	2:56
3.	"Cosmic Queries"	5:34
4.	"Evening's Kiss"	3:18
5.	"Sambo Joe from the Rainbow"	4:22
6.	"Ghost Robot"	3:39
7.	"Swing On Low"	3:25
8.	"Monotony"	3:57
9.	"Bright Copper 'Noon"	3:36
10.	"Away My Silent Lover"	4:14
11.	"Angel Chorus / Masquerade"	8:17

== Charts ==
Chart (2012)	Peak position
Belgian Albums (Ultratop Flanders)	101
UK Jazz & Blues Albums (OCC)	11
US Heatseekers Albums (Billboard)	39
