= Remy Banks =

American rapper

- Also known as: Rem
- Born: Remy José Banks; Queens, New York, U.S.
- Origin: Forest Hills, Queens, New York, U.S.
- Genres: Hip Hop; East Coast Hip Hop
- Occupation: Rapper
- Instrument: Vocals
- Years active: 2008–present
- Label: Independent
- Member of: World's Fair
- Formerly of: Children of the Night
- Website: remybanks.com

Remy Banks is an American rapper. He is a founding member of the New York music collective World's Fair. Banks was also member of the music group Children of the Night, with fellow World's Fair members Nasty Nigel and Lansky Jones.

Born at Booth Memorial Hospital in Flushing, Queens, Banks grew up primarily in Jamaica, Queens, before moving to Forest Hills, Queens.

== Career ==
On December 24, 2010, Remy Banks released the collaborative mixtape, World Famous, with record producer Hannibal King. On March 27, 2012, Remy Banks, Nasty Nigel, and Lansky Jones, as Children of the Night, released the studio album Queens... Revisited, under Mishka NYC.

On September 3, 2013, Remy Banks' hip hop collective, World's Fair, released their debut studio album, Bastards of the Party, under Fool's Gold Records. On May 17, 2015, Remy Banks released his debut solo album, higher..

Two of Banks' singles have charted on Billboard Twitter Real-Time: rem at #31 on March 7, 2015, and N1go at #50 on March 26, 2016.

== Discography ==
=== Extended plays ===
List of EPs, with release details
Title	Details
champ hoody music. ep.1	Released: April 3, 2017; Label: Self-released; Formats: Digital download
champ hoody music. ep.2	Released: October 26, 2018; Label: Self-released; Formats: Digital download
did this in detroit.	Released: July 31, 2019; Label: Self-released; Formats: Digital download

=== Albums ===
List of Studio Albums, with release details
Title	Details
Queens...Revisted (with Children of the Night)	Released: March 27, 2012; Label: Self-released; Formats: Digital download
higher.	Released: May 18, 2015; Label: Self-released; Formats: Digital download
the phantom of paradise.	Released: January 22, 2021; Label: Self-released; Formats: Digital download
champ hoody music. ep.3	Released: March 8, 2024; Label: Self-released; Formats: Digital download

=== Mixtapes ===
List of Mixtapes, with release details
Title	Details
100% (with Children of the Night)	Released: November 27, 2008; Label: Self-released; Formats: Digital download
Where the Wild Things Are (with Children of the Night)	Released: December 24, 2009; Label: Self-released; Formats: Digital download
Yes/No (with Children of the Night)	Released: February 17, 2010; Label: Self-released; Formats: Digital download
World Famous (with Hannibal King)	Released: December 24, 2010; Label: Self-released; Formats: Digital download
Bastards of the Party (with World's Fair)	Released: September 3, 2013; Label: Self-released; Formats: Digital download

=== Collaborative studio albums ===
List of Albums, with release details
Title	Details
New Lows (with World's Fair)	Released: July 20, 2018; Label: Fool's Gold Records; Formats: Digital download

=== Guest appearances ===
List of non-single guest appearances, with other performing artists, showing year released and album name
Title	Year	Artist(s)	Album
"More Clouds"	2011	Domo Genesis	Under the Influence
"Flowers"	2012	Prince Samo, Mr. MFN eXquire, Goldie Glo, Maachew Bentley	Street Viceroy
"3Flips6"	2012	ASAP Ant, Zombie Juice	non-album singles
"Drugs Got Me Spiritual"	2013	Domo Genesis	No Idols (2023 Repress)
"Pretty Girls"	2013	Grande Marshall	Mugga Man
"Eggs Florentine"	2013	Asher Roth, DJ Drama, Don Cannon, King Mez	The Greenhouse Effect Vol. 2
"Cold World"	2013	MellowHigh, Earl Sweatshirt	MellowHigh
"Intoxicated Scarfaces"	2014	Dash	Double A-Side: Vol. 2
"Where's Your Leader?"	2014	Sean C & LV, Bun B, Prodigy, CharlieRed	Loud Dreams Vol. 1
"The Rap Monument"	2014	Pusha T, Bryant Dope, Go Dreamer, Retch, Nipsey Hussle, Problem, Danny Brown, Meyhem Lauren, Raekwon, Vado, Kilo Kish, Flatbush Zombies, Renegade El Rey, Rockie Fresh, Pill, Bodega Bamz, Killer Mike, Del Harris, YG, Cyhi the Prynce, Young Thug, Aston Matthews, Prodigy, SL Jones, Nasty Nigel, Bobby Creekwater, Action Bronson, Heems, Mike G, Yak Ballz, Zebra Katz, Curtis Williams, Reese, Dave, LightSkinMac11, Alkebulan, CeeJ, Jace, Alexander Spit, ScottyATL, Dash	non-album single
"American Gods"	2015	Ratking, Teddy, Slickyboy	700-Fill
"UNTLD"	2015	DonMonique, Wara from the NBHD	Thirst Trap
"4:50 AM"	2015	Dash, Domo Genesis	non-album single
"Euphoria"	2016	Boys Noize	Mayday
"Where's Your Leader?"	2016	Prodigy, Bun B, CharlieRed	RIP #2
"Hating on Gang"	2016	AJ Tracey	Lil Tracey
"Chase & Run"	2016	Poetik Force	The Bottom Line
"Passports"	2017	Hudson Mohawke	Silicon Valley
"My Life"	2017	Budgie	The Good Book, Vol. 2
"Smoke"	2018	Bad Rabbits	non-album single
"Conversations"	2019	Fifthgod, History, Dre Dollasz	The Fifth Tape
"Dope Spot"	2020	Masta Wu	Father EP
"Gas Face"	2021	Wiki, Navy Blue	Half God
"After Party"	2021	Jay Worthy, T.F, Budgie	The Ballad of a Dopehead
"Campfire"	2022	Domo Genesis, Evidence	Intros, Outros & Interludes
"SlowItDown"	2022	Pink Siifu, Anwalk, Tyah, Big Rube	Gumbo'! (DELUXE'!!)
"Cover Your Wounds"	2022	Nyck Caution, AK the Savior	Little Nycky
"Ken Patera"	2022	Real Bad Man, Smoke DZA, Knowledge the Pirate	Mood Swings
"The Residue"	2022	Sonnyjim, Giallo Point	No Vi$ible Means of Income 2
"Runnin'"	2022	Goya Gumbani, Kiina	Face In The Storm
"Spaceship"	2022	Flock Together	Taste the Sky - New York City
"Whatever It Takes"	2022	Huey Briss	non-album single
"This 2 Shall Pass"	2023	Domo Genesis, Graymatter	What You Don't Get?!
"Scenic Route"	2023	Wiki, Tony Seltzer	14K Figaro
"Too Afraid to Dance"	2024	Chuck Strangers	A Forsaken Lover's Plea
