= Digital Lows =

Mixtape by Cities Aviv
- Released: May 2, 2011
- Genre: Alternative hip hop; cloud rap; experimental hip hop; chillwave
- Label: Fat Sandwich Records
- Producer: Muted Drone; RPLD GHOSTS; Danny Dee; Upgrayde; Royal'T; Blackbird Blackbird

Cities Aviv chronology
Digital Lows (2011)	Black Pleasure (2012)

Digital Lows is the debut mixtape by American rapper Cities Aviv, released on May 2, 2011, through Fat Sandwich Records. Various producers were enlisted to help produce the mixtape, including Muted Drone, RPLD GHOSTS, Danny Dee, Upgrayde, Royal'T, and Blackbird Blackbird. The mixtape earned attention and critical acclaim from various music publications.

== Musical style and production ==
The beats on the mixtape, which feature chillwave elements, were described as "imaginative but still traditionalist." The track "Black Box" samples Gil Scott-Heron's "Winter in America." The track "Die Young" features a looped sample of Depeche Mode's "People Are People," creating a hybrid style akin to "Rammellzee's avant-rap and Southern fight-rap." The tracks "A Beautiful Hell", "Doom x Gloom", and "sixsixsixes" are influenced by hip hop group Three 6 Mafia. The track "Meet Me on Montrose (For Ex-Lovers Only)" is based on a sample of Alessi Brothers' "Oh Lori" while the track uses a sample from electronic music act Blackbird Blackbird's cover of a Modest Mouse song, "Float On."

While his flow was compared to those of RZA, the mixtape's soul music leanings and storytelling were compared to the works of underground hip hop groups such as The Nonce and Natural Elements.

== Critical reception ==
Professional ratings
Review scores
Source	Rating
Pitchfork	(7.5/10)

Digital Lows received generally positive reviews from music publications. Pitchfork reviewer Brandon Soderberg stated: "Balance is important here, and the darkest moments of Digital Lows soon enough let up to highlight Cities Aviv's most winning quality: his mordant humanity." He also further stated: "Even the usual hip-hop clichés are afforded specificity thanks to his expressive wit and precise determination not to use words in the same exact way as every other rapper." Jon Caramanica of The New York Times described the mixtape as "lullingly pretty."

=== Accolades ===
Publication	Accolade	Rank	Ref.
Spin	40 Best Rap Albums of 2011	17	
Time Out	Top 15 Hip-Hop Mixtapes of 2011	8	

== Track listing ==
All lyrics are written by Gavin Mays.

No.	Title	Producer(s)	Length
1.	"Digital Lovvs (Intro)"	Muted Drone	1:00
2.	"Black Box" (featuring Fille Catatonique)	RPLD GHOSTS	4:00
3.	"Die Young"	Muted Drone	2:12
4.	"Tongue Kisser"	Muted Drone	1:40
5.	"Fuckeverybodyhere"	RPLD GHOSTS	3:58
6.	"Jaguar"	Danny Dee	3:12
7.	"A Beautiful Hell" (featuring Fille Catatonique)	Danny Dee	2:40
8.	"Doom x Gloom"	Royal'T	3:10
9.	"Meet Me On Montrose (For Ex-Lovers Only)"	Danny Dee	3:27
10.	"sixsixsixes"	RPLD GHOSTS	2:11
11.	"Voyeurs"	Danny Dee, Upgrayde	3:40
12.	"Float On"	Blackbird Blackbird	3:43

== Credits and personnel ==
Credits adapted from Bandcamp.

- Gavin Mays – vocals, lyrics, performance
- Muted Drone – production (1, 3–4)
- RPLD GHOSTS – production (2, 5, 10)
- Danny Dee – production (6–7, 9, 11)
- Upgrayde – production (11)
- Royal'T – production (8)
- Blackbird Blackbird – production (12)
- Matt Qualls – recording
- Drew Ryan – cover art
