= Ratking (group) =

American hip hop band

RATKING
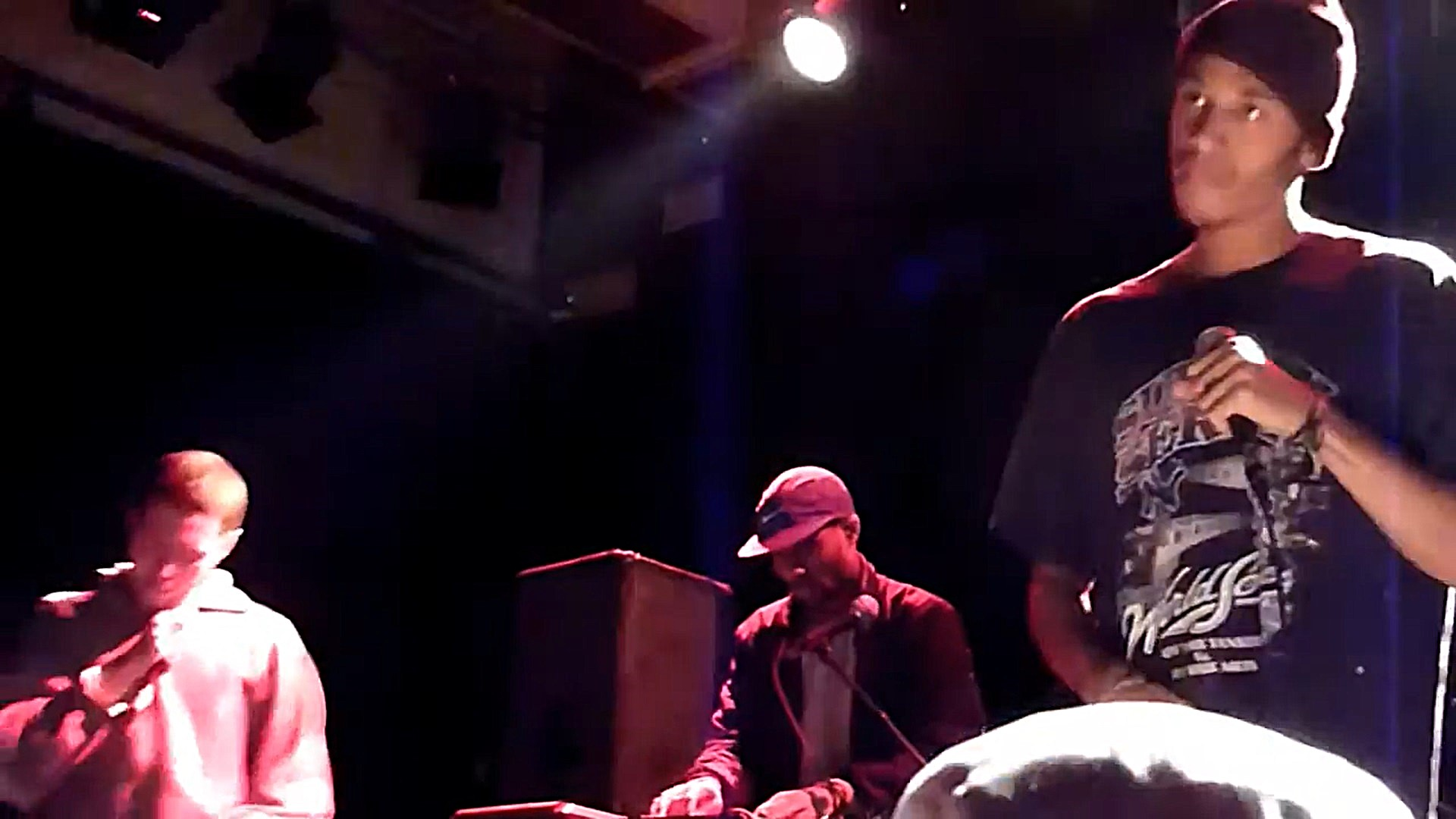
- Ratking performing in Köln in 2014. Left to right: Wiki, Sporting Life, and Hak

Background information
- Origin: New York City, New York, U.S.
- Genres: Hip hop; punk rap; East Coast hip hop
- Years active: 2011−2016
- Labels: HXC; XL; Letter Racer
- Past members: Wiki; Sporting Life; Hak
- Website: ratkingnyc.com

Ratking (often stylized in all caps) was an American hip hop group from New York City, which consisted of rappers Wiki and Hak, and producer Sporting Life. A leading force in the underground in the early 2010s, their music has been described as "stridently youthful", and the group themselves have stated they wished to reinvent rap music.

On June 22, 2016, Hak announced his departure, citing that the group "didn't see me for me", and self-released his debut solo album June. This led to the group's indefinite hiatus with Wiki and Sporting Life also venturing into further solo works. Around the same time, Wiki had already formed a supergroup with Lil Ugly Mane and Antwon, called Secret Circle, which he recorded with until an unexpected disband in 2018.

== History ==
They released their debut EP Wiki93 in November 2012. It was based on 1993, an earlier mixtape which he released in October 2011. 1993 was inspired by Suicide and Wu-Tang Clan. The group were signed by British label XL Recordings following 1993, and they re-released it as Wiki93 through their Hot Charity (HXC) imprint.

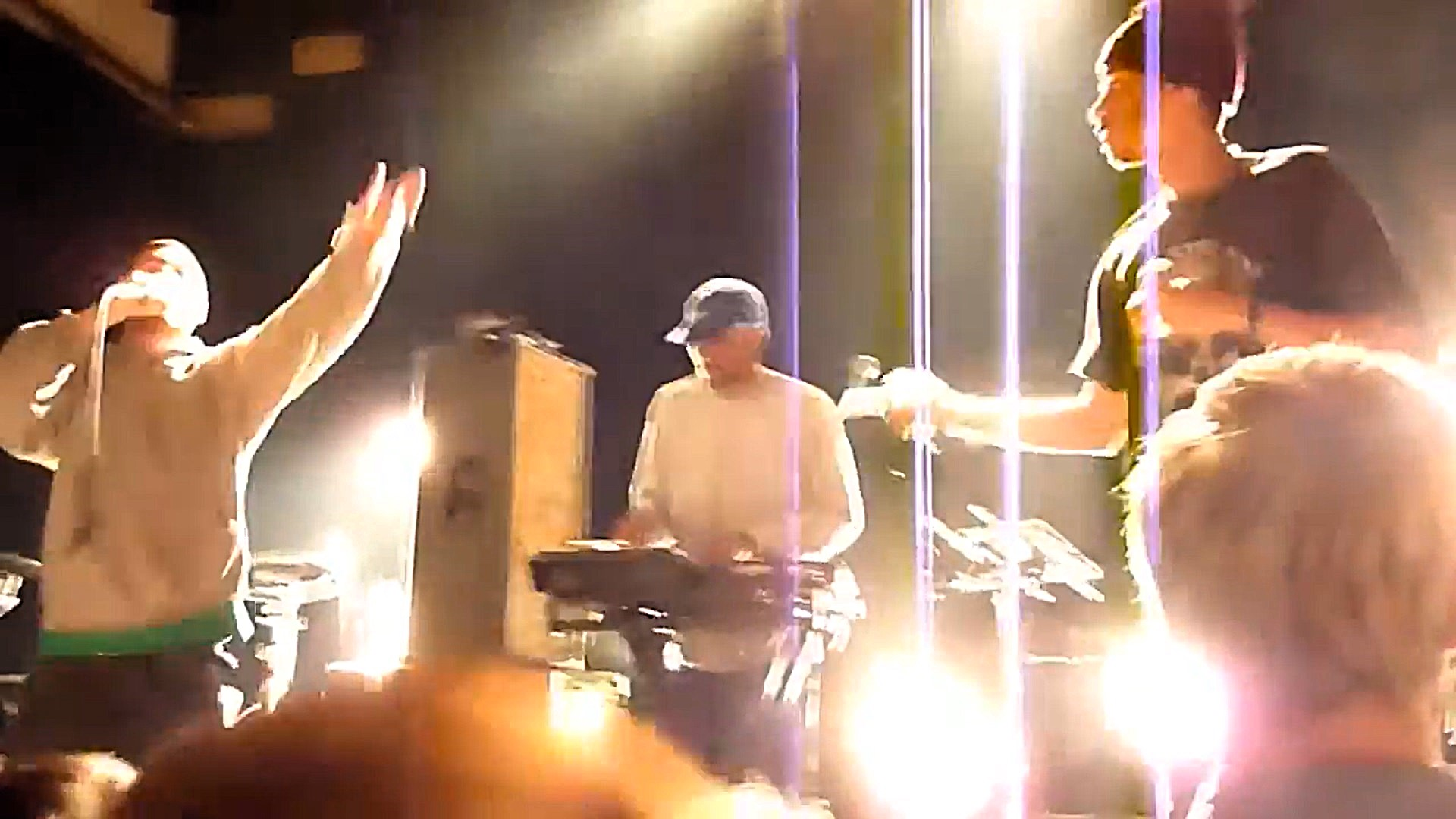
Ratking performing in Köln in 2014. Left to right: Wiki, Sporting Life, Hak

Ratking released their debut album So It Goes in 2014. It was produced by Sporting Life and engineered by Young Guru. The album's title was inspired by Kurt Vonnegut's novel Slaughterhouse-Five. The album featured collaborations with King Krule, Salomon Faye, and Princess Nokia. They have performed with Skepta and toured with Death Grips, and Earl Sweatshirt, as well as Run the Jewels and Despot. In January 2015 the group announced that their next album 700 Fill would be released in January or February 2015. It was released for free via BitTorrent in March 2015.

== Musical style ==
In addition to being inspired by rap and hip hop, the group has also cited punk rock and "many and diverse influences, from Animal Collective to Suicide" as influences on their alternative style. Wiki's solo EP 1993, later re-released as Wiki93, was inspired by Suicide and Wu-Tang Clan.

== Discography ==
=== Studio albums ===
List of studio albums, with year released
Title	Album details
So It Goes	Released: April 8, 2014; Label: HXC; Formats: LP, digital download, CD

=== Extended plays ===
List of extended plays, with year released
Title	Album details
Wiki93	Released: November 2, 2012; Label: HXC; Formats: digital download

=== Mixtapes ===
List of mixtapes, with year released
Title	Album details
700-Fill	Released: March 4, 2015; Label: Self-released; Formats: digital download

=== Singles ===
==== As lead artist ====
List of singles, with selected chart positions, showing year released and album name
Title	Year	Peak chart positions			Album
Title	Year	US	US R&B	US Rap	Album
"Pretty Picture"	2012	—	—	—	Wiki93
"Comic"	2012	—	—	—	Wiki93
"Piece of S**t"	2013	—	—	—	Wiki93
"100"	2013	—	—	—	non-album single
"Canal"	2014	—	—	—	So It Goes
"So It Goes"	2014	—	—	—	So It Goes
"So Sick Stories" (featuring King Krule)	2014	—	—	—	So It Goes
"Cocoa '88"	2014	—	—	—	So It Goes
"Snow Beach"	2015	—	—	—	So It Goes
"Arnold Palmer"	2015	—	—	—	700-Fill

== Members ==
- Wiki - vocals (2011−2016)
- Hak - vocals (2011−2016)
- Sporting Life - production (2011−2016), vocals (2015)

Additional personnel

- Racerra - production (2011−2012)
- Ramon - production (2012−2014)
