= Niontay =

- Niontay performing in 2026

Background information
- Born: Niontay Hicks; February 4, 1999 (age 27); Milwaukee, Wisconsin, U.S.
- Occupations: Rapper; Songwriter; Record Producer; Model
- Years active: 2020–present
- Musical career
- Origin: Brooklyn, New York City, U.S.
- Genres: Trap; Plugg; East Coast Hip-Hop
- Label: 10k Global

Niontay Hicks (born February 4, 1999), known professionally as Niontay, is an American rapper, songwriter, and record producer based in Brooklyn, New York City. He is the son of Dontay "Peanut Butter" Hicks.

Hicks began making music in 2015 and officially releasing music in 2021. His first release under rapper MIKE's label 10k Global was in 2021 with the single "Rapidolamusica407" (stylized in all caps). In 2023, he gained popularity with his introductory mixtape Dontay's Inferno. Hicks released his first studio album Fada<3of$ in 2025.

== Early Life ==
Hicks was born on February 4, 1999 in Milwaukee, WI. He moved to Kissimmee, FL around 2004 with his mother, where he was raised for the majority of his childhood.

Hicks had an interest in music, poetry, and literature at a young age and began making music in 2015. He has cited artists such as Lil Wayne, Kendrick Lamar, Big K.R.I.T., and Bootsy Collins as inspiration for his music.

== Career ==
=== 2017–2021: Career Beginnings ===
Hicks started releasing his music on to SoundCloud in Kissimmee, FL as late as 2017. After graduating from high school, Hicks moved to New York City in 2019 and met rapper Sideshow shortly after, who introduced him to MIKE.

He released his debut EP Blood Diamond with producer SUIQE on February 3, 2021. Hicks signed under MIKE's label 10k Global later that year, releasing his first single "Rapidolamusica407" (stylized in all caps).

=== 2022-2023: Dontay's Inferno and Demon Muppy ===
In early 2022, Hicks began releasing singles for his debut mixtape Dontay's Inferno with his first single being "BlitzBerg". His second single was "Ain't Shit" co-produced by 454. Hicks describes Dontay's Inferno as his "first real project". His final single for the mixtape was "Wheredeyat???" (stylized in all caps) featuring MIKE. The mixtape garnered traction online. "Thank Allah" (stylized in all caps), the third track on the mixtape, received praise from Pitchfork being placed on their year-end lists for Best Songs of 2023 and Best Rap Songs of 2023. Hicks said it changed his life a year after its release.

In late 2023, Hicks released one single for his sophomore EP Demon Muppy. Titled "Real hiphop", it featured Earl Sweatshirt, El Cousteau, and MIKE. It was said to be recorded on the 50th anniversary of Hip hop, recognized as August 11 of that year. Demon Muppy released weeks after the single on November 2.

=== 2024-present: Fada<3of$ and Soulja Hate Repellant ===
Hicks began rolling out singles for his album in late 2024, with his first single being "Vice Grip" produced by Tony Seltzer. In early 2025, he released two more singles; "mumbleman" and "Mr.Havemyway" (stylized in all caps). Two weeks after releasing these singles, Hicks released his debut studio album Fada<3of$.

In late 2025, Hicks released his second mixtape Soulja Hate Repellant two weeks after releasing his single "100days100nights" for it.

== Discography ==
=== Studio albums ===
List of studio albums, with selected details
Title	Album Information
Fada<3of$	Released: April 2, 2025; Label: 10k; Formats: Digital download, streaming, vinyl

=== Mixtapes ===
List of mixtapes, with selected details
Title	Mixtape Information
Dontay's Inferno	Released: April 7, 2023; Label: 10k; Formats: Digital download, streaming, vinyl, cassette
Soulja Hate Repellant	Released: December 16, 2025; Label: 10k; Formats: Digital download, streaming, CD

=== Extended plays ===
List of extended plays, with selected details
Title	EP Information
Blood Diamond (with SUIQE)	Released: February 3, 2021; Label: 10k; Formats: Streaming
Demon Muppy	Released: November 2, 2023; Label: 10k; Formats: Digital download, streaming

=== Singles ===
==== As lead artist ====
List of singles, with year released and album name
Title	Year	Album
"Rapidolamusica407"	2021	Non-album single
"BlitzBerg"	2022	Dontay's Inferno
"Ain't Shit"	2023	Dontay's Inferno
"Wheredeyat???"	2023	Dontay's Inferno
"Real hiphop" (featuring Earl Sweatshirt, El Cousteau, and MIKE)	2023	Demon Muppy
"Halftones" (featuring RealYungPhil and Surf Gang)	2024	Non-album single
"Vice Grip"	2024	Fada<3of$
"mumbleman"	2025	Fada<3of$
"Mr.Havemyway"	2025	Fada<3of$
"100days100nights"	2025	Soulja Hate Repellant

==== As featured artist ====
List of featured singles, with year released and album name
Title	Year	Album
"MySpace!" (Bear1Boss featuring Mercury and Niontay)	2021	Non-album single
"Noname" ($upremekai featuring Niontay)	2022	Non-album single
"Pavement" (Faro and Eagle Syndrome featuring Niontay)	2023	2DAY
"Jelly" (Mercury featuring Niontay)	2024	Non-album single
"Touch Up" (hernbean5150 featuring Niontay)	2024	Lab Work
"Ktown Blues" (Kilian Fonlon featuring Bailey Straughn and Niontay)	2024	Non-album single
"Versailles (It's Ɏours)" (Myquale featuring Niontay and LAN Party)	2024	Above All
"100 Cylinders" (El Cousteau featuring Niontay)	2024	Non-album single
"Curbb" (Jadasea featuring Niontay)	2024	Non-album single
"Jammers Anonymous" (MAVI featuring Niontay)	2025	Non-album single
"Amnesia" (RealYungPhil featuring Niontay)	2025	Non-album single
"Steady Havin Mafia (Made Guys)" (Lulrose featuring Niontay, RAFA, and Top$ide)	2025	Rose Vol. 3
"This Thing Of Ours" (12k Gotti featuring Niontay)	2025	800°
"Mitochondria" (M!les Ave. featuring Niontay)	2025	Non-album single
"Ways and Means" (Hakiim featuring Niontay and In-tell)	2025	Non-album single
"OK" (GLOW featuring Niontay)	2025	Non-album single
"Roadrunner" (Big YS featuring Niontay)	2025	Non-album single
"Yeah I Do" (Valee and MVW featuring Niontay)	2025	Where Were We
"Taking Up The Minutes" (Falamoun featuring Niontay)	2025	Nu Cairo
"Wata" (Ovrkast. Featuring Niontay)	2026	Striking
"Highly Volatile" (Dylvinci featuring Niontay and Ayochillmannn)	2026	Repository
"Haunting You" (Vayda featuring Niontay)	2026	Non-album single

=== Guest appearances ===
List of non-single guest appearances, with other performing artists, showing year released and album name
Title	Year	Artist(s)	Album
"oml"	2022	Anysia Kym	Soliloquy
"ATL Freestyle"	2022	Popstar Benny, MIKE	Album* (Deluxe)
"Popstar Like Benny"	2022	Na-Kel Smith	+
"Mussel Beach"	2023	MIKE, El Cousteau	Burning Desire
"Holding On"	2023	Jadasea, Laron	The Corner: Vol. 1
"Home Court Advantage"	2023	Mkyfm	23
"Souljah Rag Party"	2023	WifiGawd, GAWD	Been Bout It
"Menace 4 Society"	2023	8SZN	808 Addict
"any za?"	2023	austin fox 狐	moonleaves
"2k24 Tour"	2024	MIKE, Tony Seltzer	Pinball
"Avery Bradley"	2024	509 BMG	Cracka Pack Chris Griffin: Reloaded
"How?!"	2024	RiTchie	Triple Digits [112]
"wipe down music"	2024	Messiah!	the villain wins
"A Part The Agenda"	2024	Kilian Fonlon	Products Of Our Environment
"Shaq & Kobe"	2025	MIKE, Tony Seltzer	Pinball II
"Rose Ave."	2025	El Cousteau	Dirty Harry 2
"Crews pop"	2025	Mike Shabb	shabbvangogh
"Zouljarag"	2025	esteban.	Lastmanstanding.
"F.E.A.R."	2026	MIKE, Surf Gang	Pompeii // Utility
"Happy Machine"	2026	Sideshow	Tigray Funk
"Intimate"	2026	Lulrose	Rose Vol. 3
"Gotham City's Finest"	2026	Omari Lyesight	Digital
"Green! *Bonus*"	2026	$amaad	Idea of Evil
"whatyouwakeupfor"	2026	Kole	i ran away from dallas.
"Bean Show"	2026	Marcone, Wan Go, Yofavoritecuzn	T₩in ₩orld
"Drug Abuse"	2026	Camden Malik	40 Acres

== Tours ==
=== Headlining ===
- BTA The Tour (2025)

=== Supporting ===
- US + EU Tour (MIKE) (2022)
- Ipari Park Tour (MIKE) (2023)
- Somebody Fine Me Trouble Tour (MIKE) (2024)
- UK Headline Tour (Jadasea) (2024)
- Artists Of The Century Tour (MIKE) (2025)
- Home On The Range Tour (Earl Sweatshirt & MIKE) (2026)
