= Pompeii // Utility =

2026 collaborative studio album by Earl Sweatshirt, Mike, and Surf Gang

Studio album by Earl Sweatshirt, Mike, and SURF GANG
- Released: April 3, 2026
- Recorded: 2023–2025
- Genres: Hip-hop; ambient plugg
- Length: 64:34
- Labels: 10k Global; Tan Cressida; Surf Gang
- Producers: CajM; Djh; Earl Sweatshirt; Elipropperr; Evilgiane; Flea Diamonds; Harrison; Osyris Israel; Loukeman; Omari Lyseight; Ian Mills; Niontay; Pentagrvm; RedLee; Sundiata; Surf Gang; Tony Seltzer

Earl Sweatshirt chronology
Live Laugh Love (2025)	Pompeii // Utility (2026)

Mike chronology
Pinball II (2025)	Pompeii // Utility (2026)

Surf Gang chronology
Amnesia (2025)	Pompeii // Utility (2026)	Next Day Air. (2026)

Singles from Pompeii // Utility
- 1. "Earth" / "Minty" Released: March 10, 2026; 2. "Leadbelly" Released: March 25, 2026; 3. "Home on the Range" / "Back Home" Released: March 30, 2026

Professional ratings
Aggregate scores
Source	Rating
Metacritic	77/100
Review scores
Source	Rating
The Guardian	4/5 stars
The Needle Drop	5/10
NME	4/5 stars
Paste	C
Pitchfork	7.3/10

Pompeii // Utility (stylized in all caps) is a collaborative studio album by American rappers Earl Sweatshirt and Mike with production collective Surf Gang, released on April 3, 2026, via 10k Global, Tan Cressida, and Surf Gang Records. It is a double album consisting of two solo projects—Pompeii by Mike and Utility by Sweatshirt—which are fully produced by Surf Gang. Guest appearances include Anysia Kym, Jadasea, Niontay, and Na-Kel Smith on Pompeii, and Lerado Khalil on Utility.

Earl Sweatshirt and Mike's relationship began as early as 2016, when the former was introduced to the latter's music. Throughout the year, they inspired and collaborated on each other's projects. Surf Gang is a New York-based record label and production collective known for their fast-paced and mechanical production. Following collaborations on two tracks, the collective began recording with Earl Sweatshirt and Mike between 2023 and 2025 in New York and Los Angeles.

Announced in March 2026, promotion of the album consists of releasing two singles, "Earth / Minty" and "Leadbelly", and a concert tour which was set to take place from May to September 2026. The dates for the tour were postponed to take place from September to November 2026. The album artwork for Pompeii // Utility was designed by sculptor Sharif Farrag. The project follows Earl Sweatshirt's Live Laugh Love (2025) and Mike's Showbiz! (2025), and consists of thirty-three tracks, with fifteen from the latter and eighteen from the former. The project received mixed to positive reviews from critics.

== Background ==
Earl Sweatshirt and Mike's connection began when mutual friend and rapper Wiki introduced the latter's music to him in 2016, eventually connecting via journalist Matthew Trammell when he showed Mike's track, "40 Stops" (2016), to Earl Sweatshirt. After listening to the track, the latter purchased Mike's debut project, Longest Day (2016), for $45 on Bandcamp. Preceding this event, Mike was a fan of Earl Sweatshirt's music.

Gradually, Earl Sweatshirt's role in Mike's career evolved from an inspiration to a mentor, encouraging the latter with new ways of artistic expression. During Mike's interview with Bandcamp in 2017, he revealed Earl Sweatshirt's role in shaping his project, May God Bless Your Hustle (2017). He also reflected on when Earl Sweatshirt took him out for lunch at Kottu House in the Lower East Side of New York. Mike began to influence Earl Sweatshirt's artistry as well, impacting his 2018 studio album, Some Rap Songs.

Following Mike's tenure as an opening act in Earl Sweatshirt's Fire It Up Tour in 2019, they regularly contacted each other personally and professionally, first collaborating when the latter appeared on the former's track "Allstar" from Weight of the World (2020). This continued with Earl Sweatshirt appearing on Mike's "Plz Don't Cut My Wings" from Burning Desire (2023), "On God" with Tony Seltzer and Tony Shhnow from Pinball (2024), and "Jumanji" with Tony Seltzer from Pinball II (2025), with vice versa on the former's "Sentry" with The Alchemist from Voir Dire (2023).

Surf Gang is a New York-based record label and production collective founded by member Evilgiane in 2018, later providing production for Mike's "Belly 1" (2025) and Earl Sweatshirt's "Making the Band (Danity Kane)" (2023). Mike also mentioned a project with Surf Gang in January 2025 that never materialized. Pompeii // Utility was recorded in New York and Los Angeles between 2023 and 2025. In 2025, Mike released Showbiz! and Pinball II (with Tony Seltzer), and Earl Sweatshirt released Live Laugh Love, all to critical acclaim from music critics. Production collective Surf Gang also collaborated with British rapper Jawnino on the album, Amnesia, in December.

== Promotion and release ==
On March 10, 2026, Earl Sweatshirt and Mike announced a double collaborative studio album, with production from Surf Gang, consisting of members Harrison, Evilgiane, and Eera. The album contains thirty-three tracks, with fifteen from Mike and eighteen from Earl Sweatshirt. According to a press conference, Project // Utility has been "many years in the making" that dates back to nearly a decade. The album's title and concept were inspired by the eruption of Pompeii, based on themes of building and destruction in both the artwork and lyrical concepts, and evoking "African and diasporic traditions where art and story are collective, iterative, relational", representing a larger whole. All artwork supporting Project // Utility were designed by sculptor Sharif Farrag, Earl Sweatshirt's close friend. Anysia Kym, Jadasea, Niontay, and Na-Kel Smith appears on Pompeii, while Lerado Khalil is the sole feature on Utility.

The same day of the album's announcement, a double-single was released, consisting of Mike's "Minty", produced by Evilgiane and Pentagrvm, and Earl Sweatshirt's "Earth", produced by Harrison. A music video was also released the same day, directed by Ian Lopez and Richard Phillip Smith. It is visually structured in a two-part experience, both taking place in remote areas, "while they enjoy each other's company." Artistically, the album plans to blend Earl Sweatshirt and Mike's introspective and lyrical patterns with Surf Gang's "faster-paced, minimal, mechanical textures." The group also announced their North American and European tour, Home on the Range, to support the album, beginning on June 9, in Riverside, California, and concluding on September 8, in Tilburg, Netherlands. Pre-sale tickets began on March 11, with general on-sale tickets beginning two days later. They will also hold a single concert on April 24 in Mexico City, Mexico. On March 24, they announced shows in Australia and New Zealand scheduled in May. The following day, Earl Sweatshirt and Mike released the album's second single, "Leadbelly", with an accompanied music video. The album was released on April 3, through 10k, Tan Cressida, and Surf Gang Records.

== Track listing ==
All lyrics are written by Michael Bonema, with additional lyricists noted.

Mike – Pompeii
No.	Title	Lyrics	Music	Producer(s)	Length
1.	"The Fall"		Michael Bonema; Giane Chenheu; Eli Propper	Elipropperr; Evilgiane	1:36
2.	"My Worst (Rebuke)"		Bonema; Luke Fenton; Ian Mills; Harrison Sutherland	Harrison; Loukeman; Mills	1:20
3.	"Da Bid" (featuring Jadasea)	Jack D'Cruz	Bonema; D'Cruz; Thebe Kgositsile; Omari Lyseight; Ernst Junior Nelson; Sutherland	Harrison; Earl Sweatshirt; Flea Diamonds; Lyseight	2:47
4.	"Not 4tw" (featuring Anysia Kym)	Anysia Kim Batts	Bonema; Batts; Kgositsile; Sutherland	Harrison; Earl Sweatshirt	2:49
5.	"The Pope"		Bonema; Sutherland	Harrison	2:13
6.	"Afro"		Bonema; Nelson	Flea Diamonds	2:09
7.	"Minty"		Bonema; Chenheu; Dorian Dixon	Evilgiane; Pentagrvm	1:48
8.	"F.E.A.R." (featuring Niontay)	Niontay Hicks	Bonema; Hicks; Surf Gang	Surf Gang	2:14
9.	"Tampering"		Bonema; Sundiata Reneaux; Sutherland	Harrison; Sundiata	1:14
10.	"Shutter Island"		Bonema; Nelson	Flea Diamonds	1:12
11.	"Back LA" (featuring Na-Kel Smith)	Na-Kel Smith	Bonema; Smith; Sutherland	Harrison	2:42
12.	"Back Home"		Bonema; Sutherland	Harrison	1:36
13.	"Kirkland" (featuring Earl Sweatshirt)	Kgositsile	Bonema; Kgositsile; Sutherland	Harrison	1:33
14.	"#Free #Mike"		Bonema; Jeremy McCoulsky; Sutherland	Harrison; RedLee	1:21
15.	"Man of the Month"		Bonema; Hicks; Sutherland	Harrisonn; Niontay	2:52
Total length:					29:28

All lyrics are written by Thebe Kgositsile.

Earl Sweatshirt – Utility
No.	Title	Music	Producer(s)	Length
1.	"This2shallpass"	Thebe Kgositsile; Giane Chenheu; Harrison Sutherland	Harrison; Evilgiane	0:56
2.	":( Again :)"	Kgositsile; Sutherland	Harrison	2:06
3.	"Home on the Range"	Kgositsile; Sutherland	Harrison	1:38
4.	"React"	Kgositsile; Osyris Israel; Sutherland	Harrison; Earl Sweatshirt; Israel	2:49
5.	"Hot Water (Cahuilla)"	Kgositsile; Sutherland	Harrison	2:33
6.	"Rectangle Lens"	Kgositsile; Sutherland	Harrison	1:38
7.	"Leadbelly" (featuring Mike)	Kgositsile; Billy de Figueras; Antonio Hernandez; Eli Propper; Sutherland	Sutherland; Elipropperr; Tony Seltzer	2:33
8.	"Quikk"	Kgositsile; Sutherland	Harrison; Earl Sweatshirt	2:03
9.	"Ew!"	Kgositsile; Cameron Pickering; Sutherland	Harrison; CajM	1:39
10.	"Earth"	Kgositsile; Sutherland	Harrison	1:38
11.	"Chali 2na"	Kgositsile; Chenheu; Philip Müller	Evilgiane; Djh	1:35
12.	"Sisyphus"	Kgositsile; Sutherland	Harrison	1:30
13.	"Locusts" (featuring Lerado Khalil)	Kgositsile; Justin Simpson; Sutherland	Harrison	2:10
14.	"Tour de France"	Kgositsile; Sutherland	Harrison	1:46
15.	"Chicago"	Kgositsile; De Figueras; Hernandez; Sutherland	Harrison; Tony Seltzer	1:48
16.	"Book of Eli"	Kgositsile; De Figueras; Hernandez; Sutherland	Harrison; Earl Sweatshirt; Tony Seltzer	1:51
17.	"AOK"	Kgositsile; Sutherland	Harrison	3:22
18.	"Don't Worry!"	Kgositsile; Pickering; Sutherland	Harrison; CajM	1:31
Total length:				35:06

== Charts ==
Chart performance for Pompeii // Utility
Chart (2026)	Peak position
UK Album Downloads (Official Charts)	24
UK Independent Albums (Official Charts)	46
UK R&B Albums (Official Charts)	8
US Independent Albums (Billboard)	34
