= 454 (rapper) =

American rapper (born 1996)

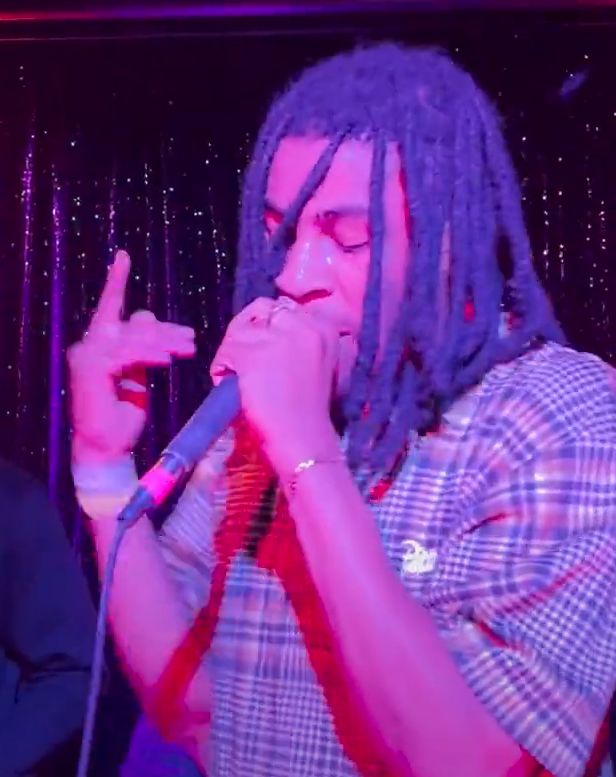
- 454 performing in 2022

Background information
- Also known as: Sqvxlls; Lil 454
- Born: Willie Wilson; July 25, 1996 (age 30); Florida
- Genres: Psychedelic rap; plugg; trap; neo soul; hyperpop
- Occupations: Rapper; record producer
- Years active: 2018–present
- Website: www.454.life

Willie Wilson (born July 25, 1996), also known as 454, is an American rapper and record producer. Born in Florida, he is known for his distinctive psychedelic rap and plugg sound. He has released three mixtapes and also provided production on songs by Denzel Curry, Freddie Gibbs, Zelooperz, Playboi Carti, and Tony Shhnow.

== Early life ==
Willie Wilson was born in Florida on July 25, 1996. His sister is also a rapper, going by the alias Pig the Gemini. 454's family moved to Longwood in 2007. His father, who had been in prison for six years from 1997 to 2003, was shot in 2008 and 2009, dying from the latter. His family then moved all over Florida, to Tampa and Orlando.

== Career ==
454 began to create beats at his home and rapped over them with his sister and cousin for fun. His alias, 454, comes from the 454 model of Chevrolet big-block engine and is a tribute to his father, who had a passion for cars. He and his girlfriend later moved to New York City in 2018, and he got a job at the Alife Rivington Club shoe store. The fast pace of the city allowed him to get into music again, uploading music to his friend Tommy Bohn's SoundCloud under the names Sqvxlls and Lil 454. One of his songs, "Late Night", went viral and encouraged him to create a full project. During the COVID-19 pandemic, 454 was able to drive back down to his native Florida and complete his first mixtape, 4 Real, which was released on March 16, 2021.

454 received even more attention in that year when his music was used as the soundtrack for Frank Ocean's luxury company Homer. He also collaborated with Denzel Curry on his 2022 album Melt My Eyez See Your Future and accompanied Aminé as an opening act for his The Best Tour Ever Tour. 454's second mixtape, Fast Trax 3, was released on October 26, 2022. He opened for Mike's Ipari Park Tour in 2023. On July 12, 2023, 454 released a collaborative extended play with Surf Gang, Fast 5. His third mixtape, Casts of a Dreamer, was released on October 2, 2024.

== Personal life ==
After his father died, 454 turned to skateboarding to cope, and has been a frequent feature on magazines focused around the sport like Transworld Skateboarding.

== Influences and artistry ==
454's music has been described as psychedelic rap and plugg, although he has put out songs that go into J Dilla-inspired neo soul or hyperpop. He has stated that his first influence was the pitched-up voice of Quasimoto, the side project of noted hip hop producer Madlib. Other influences include jungle music, Bone Thugs-n-Harmony, Lil Wayne, DJ Screw, Zaytoven, Pi'erre Bourne, Pharrell Williams, Lex Luger, and Currensy. 454's signature style is pitching-up the first half of the track and then slowing the second half to a normal pace.

== Discography ==
=== Extended plays ===
Title	Details
Fast 5 (with Surf Gang)	Released: July 12, 2023; Label: Surf Gang Records; Formats: Digital download, streaming, CD

=== Mixtapes ===
Title	Details
Fast Trax	Released: August 23, 2020; Label: Self-released; Formats: Digital download, LP
4 Real	Released: March 16, 2021; Label: Math / Honeymoon; Formats: Digital download, streaming, CD, LP, cassette
Fast Trax 2	Released: July 10, 2021; Label: Self-released; Formats: Digital download, LP
Fast Trax 3	Released: October 26, 2022; Label: Self-released; Formats: Digital download, streaming, CD, LP
Casts of a Dreamer	Released: October 2, 2024; Label: Self-released; Formats: Digital download, streaming, CD, cassette

=== Singles ===
==== As lead artist ====
Title	Year	Album
"Thankful"	2022	Non-album single
"Gangster Party"	2023	Fast 5
"One In a Million"	2024	Non-album single
"Beretta"	2024	Non-album single

==== As featured artist ====
Title	Year	Album
"Starburst" (Evilgiane featuring N.A.O Quelly and 454)	2024	#Heavensgate Vol. 1
"Anotha Late Nite" (Denzel Curry featuring 454)	2024	King Of The Mischievous South
"What I'm Feeling" (Bloodz Boi featuring 454)	2024	Non-album single
"To Death (Remix)" (Anysia Kym featuring 454)	2026	Purity (Flips)

=== Guest appearances ===
Title	Year	Artist(s)	Album
"Back to Work"	2020	Marc Ant Rivera	Idntevenknowme 4
"Dual Connect"	2020	Marc Ant Rivera	Idntevenknowme 4
"Sanjuro"	2022	Denzel Curry	Melt My Eyez See Your Future
"Foreigntiming"	2022	Na-Kel Smith	+
"Supa Bowl LVIII"	2023	Niontay	Demon Muppy
"I Dont Know Why - Live"	2023	Pig the Gemini	Long Live Curt
"Spitfire - Live"	2023	Pig the Gemini	Long Live Curt
"Act Bad"	2024	Miss Madeline	So Dramatic Deluxe
"Peaches"	2024	Atelye Marc	Magnetic Garden
"Girls Fall Out Tha Sky"	2025	Pink Siifu, Turich Benjy, Jaas	Black'!Antique
"What U Bouta Do?/A Star was Born"	2025	Mike	Showbiz!
"Krazy Head"	2025	Pig the Gemini	Lover Girl
"Images"	2025	Aminé, Toro y Moi	13 Months of Sunshine
"Unusual"	2025	Zack Villere, Girl Ultra, Tahjii	Snoey
"Shibuya Flex"	2025	Awich, RZA, Mike	Okinawan Wuman
"You Aint Gotta Lie"	2026	Denzel Curry, Luh Tyler	Strictly 4 The Scythe
"Cutlass"	2026	Cochise	Trench Town
"East End"	2026	Omari Lyesight	Digital

== Tours ==
=== Headlining ===
- UK + EU Tour (2025)
- Australia Tour (2026)
- Asia Tour (2026)
- USA Tour (2026)
- North America Tour (2026)

=== Supporting ===
- The Best Tour Ever Tour (Aminé) (2022)
- Ipari Park Tour (Mike) (2023)
- Somebody Fine Me Trouble Tour (Mike) (2024)
- Mischievous South Tour (Denzel Curry) (2025)
