= Tears Of Joy (mixtape) =

tears of joy

Mixtape by Mike
- Released: June 21, 2019
- Genre: Hip-hop
- Length: 41:49
- Language: English
- Label: 10k
- Producers: dj blackpower; Bluezy; Michul Kuun; Ohbliv; Rbchmbrs; Laron; Sporting Life; Ted Kamal; Adé Hakim; Omari Lyesight; RedLee; Ntvrme; Navy Blue

Mike chronology
War in my Pen (2018)	tears of joy (2019)	weight of the world (2020)

Tears Of Joy (stylized in all lowercase) is the fourth mixtape by American rapper and producer Mike, released on June 21, 2019, through his label 10k Global.

== Background and release ==
This mixtape followed a trend of many of Mike's projects, releasing on a solstice. Mike's studio albums May God Bless Your Hustle, Weight of the World, and Disco!, released in 2017, 2020, and 2021 respectively, would all also be released on June 21; the summer solstices of those years.

On June 12, 2019, Mike announced the mixtape title and release date along with a music video for the track "Its Like Basketball" shot by Dey Visuals.

The mixtape was released on June 21, 2019, alongside a second music video for the track "Planet", directed by Conor Prunty.

== Critical reception ==
Professional ratings
Review scores
Source	Rating
Pitchfork	8.3/10

Writing for Pitchfork, Alphonse Pierre described the project as "the fullest and most realized album [sic]" of Mike's discography at the time of its release, including the mixtape in Pitchfork's Best New Music. Colin Gannon of The Fader praised the mixtape's writing and production. Writing about the lyricism of the penultimate track "True Blood", he stated "the sense of personal devastation is crushing" Gannon described the production of the album as simultaneously "pain-etched" and "full of vigor". In 2024, Sheldon Pearce for NPR Music claimed Mike's writing on the second track "Whole Wide World" to be a "personal favorite" of his.

=== Year-end lists ===
Year-end rankings for tears of joy
Publication	List	Rank	Ref.
Pitchfork	The 50 Best Albums of 2019	31	
Treble	The Top 50 Albums of 2019	33	

== Artwork and packaging ==
Sage Elsesser, professionally known as Navy Blue, was credited by Mike for the artwork for the mixtape on his Bandcamp and SoundCloud releases. He was also credited as the producer for the final track on the mixtape "Stargazer Pt.3".

For the five year anniversary of the mixtape's release on June 21, 2024, a vinyl box set was released for the mixtape via Mike's 10k Global and Bandcamp websites. The box set consisted of six 7" records that contained all 20 tracks.

== Track listing ==
All tracks written by Michael Bonema and produced under his alias dj blackpower, except where noted. Credits adapted from Tidal. Track length adapted from Bandcamp.

tears of joy track listing
No.	Title	Producer(s)	Length
1.	"Scarred Lungs Vol.1 & 2"	Bluezy; Michul Kuun	3:14
2.	"Whole Wide World"	Ohbliv	1:35
3.	"Goin Truuu"	Rbchmbrs	1:44
4.	"Gr8ful 2k19"		1:19
5.	"Take Crowns"		2:03
6.	"Memorial"	Dj Blackpower; Laron	1:39
7.	"Summer 17"	Laron	4:43
8.	"Big Smoke"		1:42
9.	"Its Like Basketball"	Dj Blackpower; Sporting Life	1:37
10.	"Ain't No Love"	Ted Kamal	2:11
11.	"ParkS"		2:25
12.	"Planet"	Adé Hakim	1:24
13.	"#Memories" (featuring Duendita)		2:16
14.	"Right Here Next To You, Baby"		1:09
15.	"Sleepwalk"	Omari Lyesight; RedLee	1:50
16.	"Breathe, Good"		1:22
17.	"Fool In Me"		1:44
18.	"Suffocate"		2:57
19.	"True Blood"	DJ Blackpower; Ntvrme	1:32
20.	"Stargazer Pt.3"	Navy Blue	3:23
Total length:			41:49
