= 13 Months of Sunshine =

Studio album by Aminé
- Released: May 16, 2025
- Genre: Hip-hop
- Length: 48:14
- Label: CLBN; 10K Projects

Aminé chronology
| Kaytraminé (2023) | 13 Months of Sunshine (2025) |

Singles from 13 Months of Sunshine
- 1. "Familiar" Released: March 14, 2025; 2. "Arc de Triomphe" Released: April 9, 2025; 3. "Vacay" Released: May 2, 2025

13 Months of Sunshine is the third studio album by American rapper Aminé. It was released through CLBN and 10K Projects on May 16, 2025. The album features guest appearances from Leon Thomas III, Lido, Waxahatchee, chlothegod, 454, and Toro y Moi.

== Release ==
Prior to release, 13 Months of Sunshine was promoted by three singles: "Familiar", "Arc de Triomphe", and "Vacay". "Arc de Triomphe" samples a song, "Has It Come to This?", by The Streets.

== Reception ==
NPR called the album a "hard pivot" full of "textured introspection".

== Track listing ==
13 Months of Sunshine track listing
| No. | Title | Writer(s) | Producer(s) | Length |
|---|---|---|---|---|
| 1. | "New Flower!" (featuring Leon Thomas) | Adam Daniel; Dacoury Dahi Natche; Ely Rise; Isaac "Zac" De Boni; Leon George Thomas III; Madison Stewart; Michael "Finatik" Mulé | Dahi; Ely Rise; FnZ | 3:28 |
| 2. | "Feels So Good" | Daniel; Natche; De Boni; Mulé | Dahi; FnZ | 2:11 |
| 3. | "Sage Time" | Daniel; Irvin Mejia; Peder Losnegård; Scott Zhang | Lido; Monsune; Pasqué | 3:06 |
| 4. | "I Think It's You" | Daniel; James Stack; Josiah Sherman; Luke Fenton | Buddy Ross; Jim-E Stack; Loukeman | 3:45 |
| 5. | "Cool About It" (featuring Lido) | Daniel; Chaz Bear; Forrest Kline; Mejia; Stack; Sherman; Westen Weiss | Buddy Ross; Jim-E Stack; Pasqué; Toro y Moi^{[a]}; Westen Weiss^{[a]} | 2:43 |
| 6. | "History" (featuring Waxahatchee) | Daniel | Loukeman | 3:03 |
| 7. | "Vacay" | Daniel; Natche; Rise; Emmanuel Sow | Dahi; Ely Rise | 2:22 |
| 8. | "Familiar" | Daniel; Mejia; Stack; Sherman; Fenton | Buddy Ross; Jim-E Stack; Loukeman; Pasqué | 1:47 |
| 9. | "Doing the Best I Can" | Daniel; Brian Robert Jones; Natche; Eli Teplin; Stack | Eli Teplin; Jim-E Stack; Dahi^{[a]} | 2:40 |
| 10. | "Temptations" | Daniel; Mejia; Stack; Sherman; Fenton | Buddy Ross; Jim-E Stack; Pasqué | 2:32 |
| 11. | "Be Easier on Yourself" | Abigail Elizabeth Smith; Daniel; Austin Brown; Natche; Mejia; Nile Goveia; Scott Zhang | Austin Brown; Govi; Monsune; Pasqué; Dahi^{[a]} | 3:21 |
| 12. | "Raspberry Kisses" | Daniel; Elias Srouji; Irvin Daniel; Madison Stewart; Losnegård; Weiss | Lido; Pasqué; Westen Weiss; Ibn Rafiq^{[a]} | 3:01 |
| 13. | "13MOS" | Daniel; Aster Aweke; Natche; Stewart; Oliver Rodigan | Dahi; Cadenza^{[a]} | 4:21 |
| 14. | "Changer" (featuring chlothegod) | Daniel; Chloe Chavis; Mejia; Stack; Sherman; Fenton | Buddy Ross; Jim-E Stack; Loukeman; Pasqué | 3:23 |
| 15. | "Arc de Triomphe" | Daniel; Stewart; Michael Skinner | Lido | 2:46 |
| 16. | "Images" (featuring 454 and Toro y Moi) | Daniel; Bear; Fenton; Willie Wilson | Loukeman | 3:37 |
| Total length: | | | | 48:14 |

Notes

- ^{^[a]} signifies an additional producer

== Personnel ==
Credits adapted from Tidal.

Performance

- Aminé – vocals
- Leon Thomas – featured vocals (1)
- Lido – vocals (5)
- Waxahatchee – vocals (6)
- Marché Black – additional vocals (7)
- Yebba – vocals (11)
- 454 – vocals (16)
- Toro y Moi – vocals (16)

Musicians

- Austin Brown – programming (11)
- Dahi – programming (1, 2, 7, 13)
- FNZ – programming (1, 2)
- Govi – programming (11)
- Lido – programming (3, 12, 15)
- Loukeman – programming (4, 6, 10, 14, 16)
- Danny McKinnon – bass (1, 13)
- Monsune – programming (3, 11)
- Pasqué – programming (3, 5, 8, 10–12, 14)
- Ely Rise – programming (1, 7)
- Brian Robert Jones – bass (9)
- Buddy Ross – programming (4, 5, 8, 10, 14)
- Jim-E Stack – programming (4, 5, 8–10, 14)
- Eli Teplin – programming (9)
- Westen Weiss – programming (12)

Technical

- David Nakaji – recording (1–7, 9, 13, 16), mixing
- Chris Athens – mastering
- Brad Cook – recording (6)
- Charlie Hallock – recording (12)
- Peder Losnegård – recording (5, 15)
- Victor Leonardo Ovalle – mixing assistance (1, 2, 5–8, 10, 12, 14, 15)
- Aleksei Savchenko – recording (11, 12)
- James Stack – recording (4, 5, 8–10, 14, 16)
- Jonathan "Siple" Velazquez – mixing assistance (3, 4, 11, 12, 16)
- Veronica Wyman – recording (9, 11)
- Willie Wilson – recording (16)

== Charts ==
Chart performance for 13 Months of Sunshine
| Chart (2025) | Peak position |
|---|---|
| Portuguese Streaming Albums (AFP) | 199 |
