= Mark William Lewis =

British indie musician

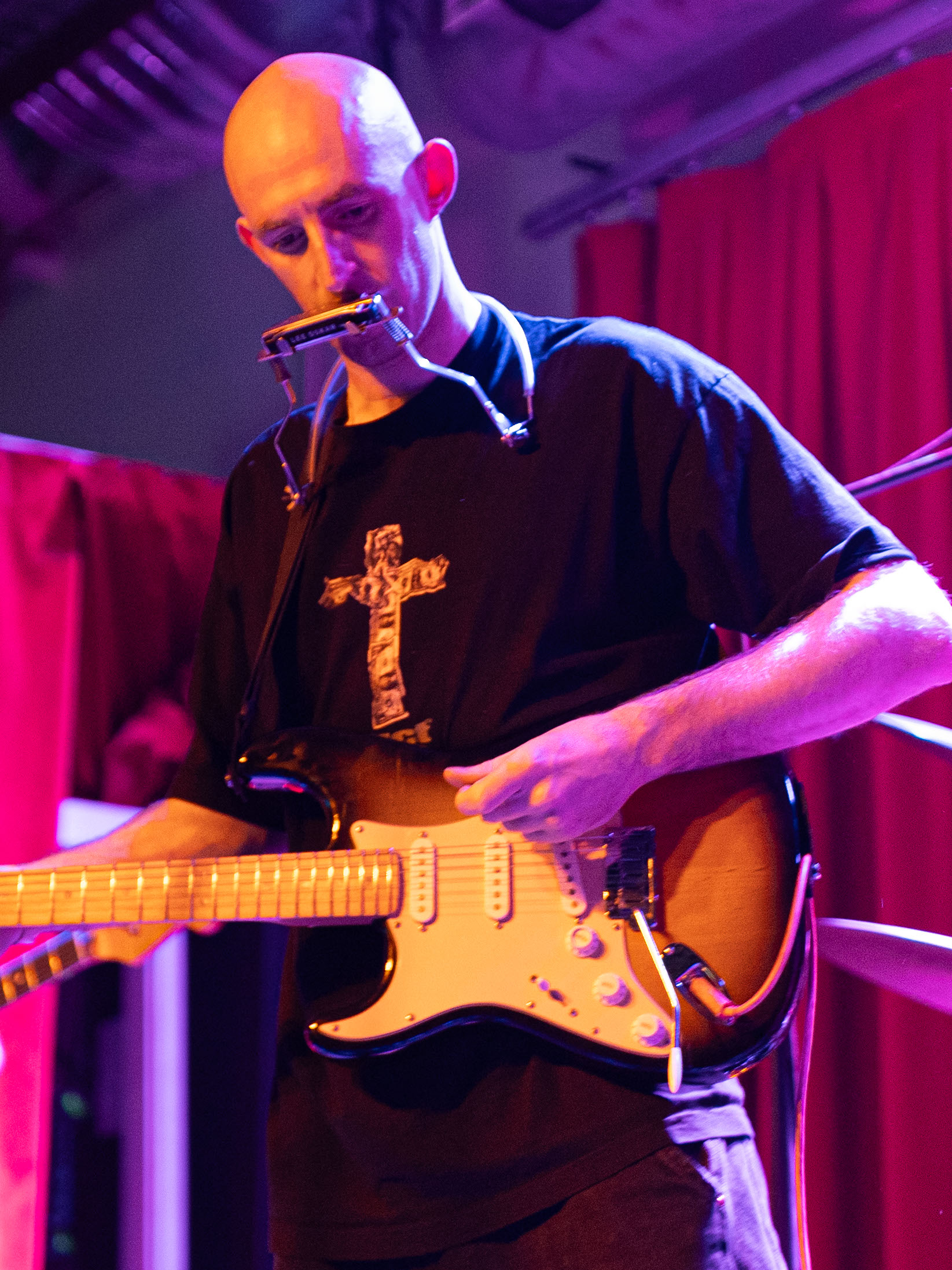

Background information
- Born: Stamford Hill, London
- Origin: London
- Genres: Experimental; indie rock; dream pop; experimental rock
- Occupations: musician; songwriter; record producer
- Years active: 2020–present
- Labels: A24; Scenic Route

Mark William Lewis is a British musician and songwriter known for his multi-genre music, blending dream pop, indie rock, jazz, folk and experimental music. He is based in South London and has collaborated with artists like Mike, Nina Cristante, and Sokora Violetov. During his 2025 tour, he played with Samba Jean-Baptiste as his opener.

== Personal life ==
Lewis spent his early life in Stamford Hill in Hackney, East London, where he was raised reading modernist and avant-garde writers like T. S. Eliot, Allen Ginsberg, and James Joyce. His dad, Nigel Lewis, was a writer who published a book dedicated to Lewis about metaphor and language which helped shaped Lewis's creativity when he studied arts at Goldsmiths University in London, starting in 2012.

== Musical career ==
=== 2021–2022: Early EPs and singles ===
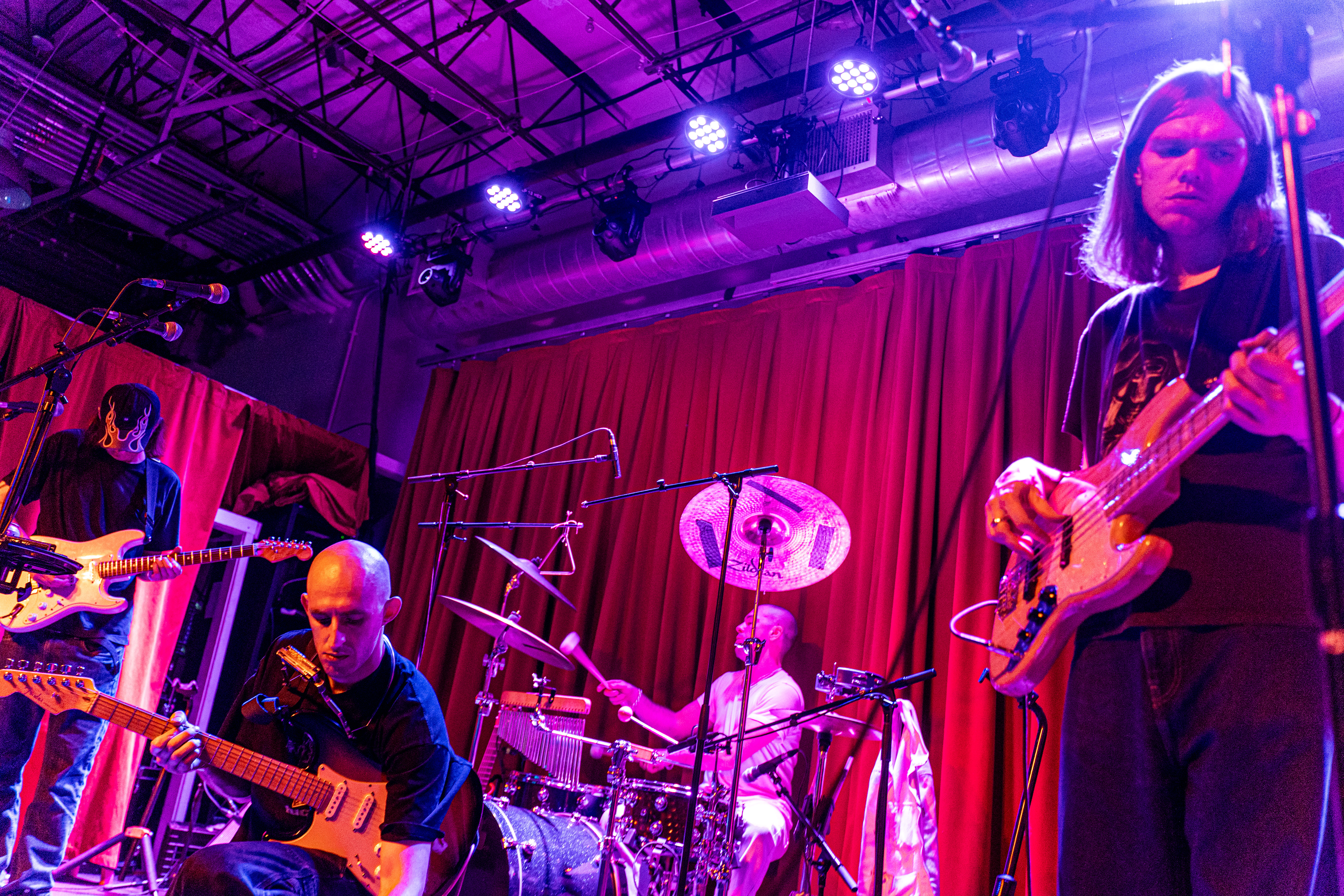
Mark William Lewis at Songbyrd Music House in DC with his bandmates Jamie Neville, Billy Howard Price, and Harry Plomer (L-R)

Lewis started after the COVID-19 pandemic performing in DIY venues like M.O.T., Ormside Projects, and Avalon Cafe with artists like Nina Cristante, lead singer of the indie band Bar Italia. His debut EP, Pleasure is Everything, was produced in late 2021 in a 20-story apartment building in Deptford, South East London. The EP's cover art features a skyline photograph taken from his flat. In January 2022, he released a single called "Thinner" with Nina Cristante. In the spring of the same year, he released his second EP, God Complex, which would later be made into a compilation and a vinyl release along his first EP as Pleasure Is Everything / God Complex. Mark William Lewis plays with Billy Howard Price on drums, Jamie Neville on lead guitar, and Harry Plomer on bass guitar.

=== 2023–present: Living and self-titled album ===
At the start of 2023, Lewis self-released his debut LP, Living. The LP centers around themes like the heaviness of life and death. It was reviewed by Pitchfork receiving a 7.6/10, giving Lewis critical acclaim and coverage for the first time beyond his word-of-mouth popularity. The same year he released a two single EP with Sokora Violetov

In September 2024, Lewis collaborated with Mike Bonema on his song "Let's Have a Ball" on Burning Desire. That next year he performed with him on NPR Music's Tiny Desk Concert alongside Liv.e.

In June 2025, Lewis became the first artist to sign a non-soundtrack album with A24 Music for his self-titled album, Mark William Lewis.
