= Pinball II =

Studio album by Mike and Tony Seltzer
- Released: May 7, 2025
- Genre: Hip-hop
- Length: 33:14
- Label: 10k
- Producer: Tony Seltzer

Mike chronology
Showbiz! (2025)	Pinball II (2025)	Pompeii // Utility (2026)

Singles from Pinball II
- 1. "Prezzy" Released: April 16, 2025; 2. "WYC4" Released: April 30, 2025

Pinball II is a collaborative album by the American rapper Mike and the record producer Tony Seltzer. It was released on May 7, 2025, through Mike's record label 10k. A sequel to their 2024 album Pinball, it was Mike's second project of 2025, following his solo album Showbiz!. Seltzer produced every track and worked with co-producers including Clams Casino, Akachi, Dylvinci, Ivvys1, Laron, Vinny Fanta, and Mike's production alias DJ Blackpower. Earl Sweatshirt, Lunchbox, Sideshow, and Niontay appear as guest vocalists.

The album expands the first Pinball's trap-oriented sound. Its 17 brief tracks use distorted bass, synthesizers, pitched vocal fragments, sound effects, and transitions associated with mixtape culture; critics also identified elements of plugg, cloud rap, chopped and screwed music, and regional rap styles. Mike alternates boasts about his success with writing about fame, money, relationships, and emotional strain. Reviews in Pitchfork, Rolling Stone, Slant Magazine, and Hip-Hop Wired praised the collaborators' chemistry and Mike's ability to retain his introspective writing within the album's more accessible, high-energy setting. Pinball II was included in 2025 best-album selections by Pitchfork, Complex, BrooklynVegan, and the Quietus.

== Background and recording ==
Mike and Seltzer made the first Pinball while Mike was also recording Burning Desire (2023). Mike said that the favorable response to the collaboration, which placed him over brighter and more forceful production than his usual soul loops, encouraged him to explore styles beyond the expectations of his established audience. After releasing Showbiz! on January 31, 2025, he returned to Seltzer for a second album. In an interview with Dazed, Mike described the sequel as the result of an intensive period working with Seltzer in a windowless studio.

Seltzer later explained that Mike would visit his studio, listen to beats he had made during the preceding week, choose one, and begin writing. The sessions often had other people present and an informal atmosphere; Seltzer moved between the room and the recording setup as Mike worked. After recording, Seltzer undertook more post-production than he had on the first album. He mixed transitions between tracks and added sound effects, treating the sequencing as part of the production. Gabriel Schuman mixed and mastered the album.

Although Seltzer produced all 17 tracks, the album incorporates several co-producers. Akachi co-produced "Sin City"; Ivvys1 worked on "Dolemite" and "Chest Painz"; Dylvinci and Laron contributed to "Money & Power" and "Belt", respectively; and Clams Casino co-produced "Prezzy". Vinny Fanta and Mikey Fleece contributed to "Sucka-Free" and "Don't Force It", and Fanta also worked on "Splat!". "Jumanji" was the first song on the pair's joint projects for which Mike co-produced with Seltzer under his DJ Blackpower alias.

== Music and lyrics ==
Pinball II is a hip-hop album rooted in trap. Paul Attard of Slant Magazine wrote that it continues the first album's crisp trap production while incorporating plugg and cloud-rap details. Lei Takanashi of Pitchfork emphasized distorted bass, bright synthesizers, and the influence of Lex Luger's early-2010s production. Takanashi compared the horns and horror-film strings of "Sin City" to Luger's work on Waka Flocka Flame's Flockaveli (2010), and likened the bouncing rhythm of "#71" to an updated litefeet track.

Andre Gee of Rolling Stone interpreted the album's changing styles as an extension of the pinball metaphor: Seltzer moves between several strands of popular rap production while Mike adjusts his flow to each one. Gee also connected its compact structure and presentation to mixtape culture. Twelve of the 17 tracks last between 90 seconds and 2 minutes 25 seconds, and Seltzer frequently introduces songs with altered fragments of the vocals that follow. The transitions include a lowered vocal preview before "Dolemite", a descending effect and dancehall sirens around "Money & Power", and shifts in speed at both ends of "Prezzy". Seltzer said that he deliberately connected the tracks during post-production, in contrast to later projects on which he kept songs separate.

The production varies within that framework. Attard described "Prezzy" as opening with chopped vocals, breaking glass, and sirens before moving into Clams Casino's softer synthesizers; he heard a related abrupt change in the distorted bass of "Amiri". Peter Berry of Complex characterized "Sin City" through its heavy 808s and gothic synthesizers, "Golden Dragon" as dreamlike trap, and "Money & Power" as influenced by G-funk. Gee noted the ethereal sample on "Shaq & Kobe" and the sparse keys, drums, and video-game effect on the closing track, "Chest Painz".

Mike's delivery is generally more direct and energetic than on his self-produced work, but the lyrics retain the tension between confidence and vulnerability found across his catalog. Takanashi wrote that Mike sounds more assured than on the first Pinball, both when attempting arena-sized rap and when addressing personal subjects. Attard similarly found his writing freer and more playful, pointing to references to worry on "Money & Power", rapid change on "Angsty", and difficulty recognizing good fortune on "#71". Mike told Dazed that his confidence had grown as music enabled him to support his family and form friendships with other artists.

Gee grouped the album's subjects into braggadocio, romantic conflict, responses to detractors, and self-examination. On "Sin City", Mike connects memories of stealing clothes while poor with an acknowledgment that he was trying to cope and heal; Gee cited the progression as an example of Mike adding personal reflection to familiar trap themes. Takanashi identified similar reservations about wealth and recognition on "Money & Power", "Don't Force It", and "Chest Painz", where Mike distinguishes his need for money from a desire for greater fame.

== Release and promotion ==
A social-media-only preview of "Dolemite" preceded the release. Mike and Seltzer announced Pinball II on April 16, 2025, and released "Prezzy" as its lead single that day. Its music video was directed by Nicholas Stafford Briggs. The announcement also disclosed the album's 17-song track list and its guests: Earl Sweatshirt, Niontay, Lunchbox, Sideshow, and Clams Casino, the last as a co-producer rather than vocalist. On April 30, the pair released the second single, "WYC4", with a video directed by Ian Lopez and co-starring British rapper and producer Jadasea.

The album was released digitally on May 7 through 10k. It contains 17 tracks and runs for 33 minutes and 14 seconds. Later in 2025, 10k offered Pinball and Pinball II together as a gatefold double LP, in standard black vinyl and a label-exclusive clear edition.

== Critical reception ==
Professional ratings
Review scores
Source	Rating
Pitchfork	8.1/10
Rolling Stone	4 stars
Slant Magazine	4 stars

Lei Takanashi's review for Pitchfork called Pinball II a more accessible version of Mike's music that nevertheless sounded true to him. He praised the way Seltzer's forceful production supported both Mike's flex-heavy performances and his more candid writing, singling out "Sin City", "#71", "Money & Power", and "Chest Painz". Andre Gee, writing in Rolling Stone, likewise argued that the album demonstrated Mike's adaptability rather than a division between introspective and trap-oriented rap. He praised the pacing of its short songs, Seltzer's selective use of mixtape effects, and Mike's ability to add self-awareness to established rap subjects.

Paul Attard of Slant Magazine considered the sequel larger and nearly better than its predecessor without becoming labored. He wrote that its 17 concise tracks preserved the first album's cohesion and ease, and praised the collaborators' coordination as well as the guest appearances by Niontay and Earl Sweatshirt. D. L. Chandler of Hip-Hop Wired called the album brilliant and highlighted Mike's ability to adjust his delivery to Seltzer's production, particularly on "Golden Dragon" and "Money & Power"; he regarded Sideshow's performance on "Hell Date" and Earl Sweatshirt's on "Jumanji" as its strongest guest verses. In the Fader, Jordan Darville described the record as a further move away from the insularity sometimes associated with Mike's music. Darville found it more extroverted without losing its soulful qualities and noted that Mike still addressed the effects of fame and his detention in Japan amid the boasts.

For Complex, Berry ranked Pinball II 13th on the publication's midyear albums list. He called it more adventurous than the first album and praised Mike's command of different flows across Seltzer's range of production. Pitchfork included it in a rolling selection of the best music of 2025, and the Quietus placed it at number 93 in its midyear readers' and contributors' poll. At the end of the year, Andrew Sacher of BrooklynVegan jointly ranked Pinball II and Mike's Showbiz! 17th among rap albums, calling the former an upbeat, trap-influenced continuation of the first Pinball.

=== Accolades ===
Selected 2025 lists featuring Pinball II
Publication	List	Rank	Ref.
Complex	The Best Albums of 2025 (So Far)	13	
BrooklynVegan	25 Best Rap Albums of 2025 (Note: Jointly ranked with Mike's Showbiz!.)	17	
The Quietus	The Quietus Albums of the Year So Far 2025	93	
Pitchfork	The Best Music of 2025 So Far	—	

== Track listing ==
Track listing and lengths are adapted from Bandcamp and Qobuz.

Pinball II track listing
No.	Title	Featured artist(s)	Length
1.	"Sin City"		2:35
2.	"Dolemite"	Lunchbox	2:19
3.	"#71"		1:36
4.	"WYC4"		1:50
5.	"Golden Dragon"		1:47
6.	"Money & Power"		1:43
7.	"Belt"		1:54
8.	"Sucka-Free"		1:26
9.	"Prezzy"		2:06
10.	"Angsty"		1:23
11.	"Don't Force It"		1:31
12.	"Hell Date"	Sideshow	2:23
13.	"Splat!"		1:43
14.	"Shaq & Kobe"	Niontay	2:26
15.	"Amiri"		1:43
16.	"Jumanji"	Earl Sweatshirt	2:46
17.	"Chest Painz"		2:03
Total length:			33:14

== Personnel ==
Credits are adapted from Qobuz.

- Mike – vocals; additional production as DJ Blackpower (16)
- Tony Seltzer – production
- Lunchbox – featured vocals (2)
- Sideshow – featured vocals (12)
- Niontay – featured vocals (14)
- Earl Sweatshirt – featured vocals (16)
- Akachi – additional production (1)
- Ivvys1 – additional production (2, 17)
- Dylvinci – additional production (6)
- Laron – additional production (7)
- Vinny Fanta – additional production (8, 11, 13)
- Mikey Fleece – additional production (8, 11)
- Clams Casino – additional production (9)
- Lord Unknown – additional production (12)
- Gabriel Schuman – mixing, mastering
