= Beware of the Monkey =

Mixtape by Mike
- Released: December 21, 2022
- Genre: Hip-hop
- Length: 33:32
- Language: English
- Label: 10k
- Producer: dj blackpower

Mike chronology
Disco! (2021)	Beware of the Monkey (2022)	Faith Is a Rock (2023)

Singles from Beware of the Monkey
- 1. "nuthin i can do is wrng" Released: October 13, 2022; 2. "What Do I Do?" Released: November 3, 2022; 3. "Stop Worry!" Released: November 29, 2022

Beware of the Monkey is the fifth mixtape by American rapper Mike, released on December 21, 2022, through 10k.

== Background and release ==
The album followed a trend of many of Mike's albums, releasing on a solstice. The album is named after a horoscope Mike saw in a Chinese restaurant.

On October 13, 2022, Mike announced the album and released its first single, "nuthin i can do is wrng", alongside a music video directed by Ryosuke Tanzawa. In his review for Pitchfork, Dylan Green praised the single as a "glimpse of an already masterful talent polishing his craft." James Rettig of Stereogum described the single as "hypnotic." On November 3, 2022, Mike released the album's second single, "What Do I Do?", alongside a music video directed by Xin Wang. He also announced the Ipari Park Tour with 454 and Slauson Malone 1 in support of the album. The Fader's Raphael Helfand described the single as a "characteristically woozy slow burn." Gabriel Bras Nevares of HotNewHipHop called the single "moody and ethereal." On November 29, 2022, Mike released the album's third single, "Stop Worry!", featuring Jamaican singer Sister Nancy, alongside a music video directed by Ryosuke Tanzawa. Jada Ojii of HotNewHipHop described Sister Nancy's feature as "melodic and hypnotizing." Stereogum's Tom Breihan described Mike's verse as a "sleepy stream-of-consciousness."

The album released on December 21, 2022, alongside a music video for "No Curse Lifted (rivers of love)" directed by Ryosuke Tanzawa. On January 26, 2023, Mike released a music video directed by Christopher Currence for "Weary Love". On March 10, 2023, Mike released a music video directed by Ryosuke Tanzawa for "As 4 Me". On September 7, 2023, Mike released a music video for "Ipari Park" directed by Cynthia Igbokwe and Danny Gubber.

== Critical reception ==
Professional ratings
Aggregate scores
Source	Rating
Metacritic	86/100
Review scores
Source	Rating
Beats Per Minute	80%
HipHopDX	4.2/5
Pitchfork	8.1/10

According to the review aggregator Metacritic, Beware of the Monkey received "universal acclaim" based on a weighted average score of 86 out of 100 from 5 critic scores.

Writing for Beats Per Minute, Tim Sentz praised Mike's writing on the album, stating that "he raps about pain and perseverance like he's lived a hundred lifetimes already." Anthony Malone of HipHopDX praised the album's themes of dealing with death, grief, and depression. Ryan Dillon of Glide Magazine praised Mike's instrumental production on the album, writing: "the instrumentals presented on this album are put together gives them the feeling of history being stitched together through muddy drum loops and dancing sample chops." In his review for Spin, Tomas Miriti Pacheco described Mike's lyricism as "layered" and "effortless" and that the album "delivers his boldest songs yet." Jaelani Turner Williams of Okayplayer called the album Mike's "most meditative album yet." Stereogum's Chris Deville described the album's production as Mike's most engaging to date. Isaac Fontes of HotNewHipHop writes that the album "further cements [Mike] as one of underground rap's best storytellers." Writing for Pitchfork, Stephen Kearse described the album as "self-assured and polyvalent, a current of shifting emotional states that MIKE's exquisite word and production choices shape into rich affirmations."

== Track listing ==
All tracks written by Michael Bonema and produced under his alias dj blackpower, except where noted.

No.	Title	Writer(s)	Length
1.	"nuthin i can do is wrng"		1:58
2.	"As 4 Me"		1:43
3.	"Eczema"		1:52
4.	"Light (if u can't see)" (featuring Jadasea)	Michael Bonema; Jack D'Cruz	3:37
5.	"No Curse Lifted (rivers of love)"		1:49
6.	"What Do I Do?"		3:06
7.	"Ipari Park" (featuring Klein)	Bonema; Klein	2:41
8.	"Swoosh 23"		2:35
9.	"Tapestry"		1:37
10.	"Stop Worry!" (featuring Sister Nancy)	Bonema; Ophlin Russell	2:29
11.	"WEARY LOVE"		2:11
12.	"Concrète" (featuring King Carter)	Bonema; Cheikhuana Bamba Fall	3:53
13.	"Closing Credits"		3:54
