= Pinball (Mike and Tony Seltzer album) =

Studio album by Mike and Tony Seltzer
- Released: March 6, 2024
- Genre: Hip-hop
- Length: 21:24
- Label: 10k
- Producer: Tony Seltzer

Mike chronology
Burning Desire (2023)	Pinball (2024)	Showbiz! (2025)

Singles from Pinball
- 1. "R&B" Released: February 14, 2024

Pinball is a collaborative album by the American rapper Mike and the record producer Tony Seltzer. It was released on March 6, 2024, through Mike's record label 10k. The pair first worked together on Mike's 2017 mixtape May God Bless Your Hustle and reconnected while he was making Burning Desire (2023). They developed Pinball from a series of sessions at Seltzer's studio, where Mike asked to rap over the producer's harder, trap-oriented instrumentals. Mike recorded one song during most visits while Seltzer handled recording, production, and sequencing.

The album departs from the hazy, sample-based sound associated with much of Mike's earlier work. Critics described its production in terms of trap, drill, snap, and quiet storm, while noting Mike's use of shorter phrases, altered flows, and AutoTune. Its lyrics place greater emphasis on boasts and pleasure than his more introspective records, although reviewers found moments of reflection throughout. The album features Earl Sweatshirt, Tony Shhnow, Jay Critch, and Niontay, and was preceded by the single "R&B". It received positive assessments from Pitchfork, NPR, and several year-end publications. Pinball appeared on 2024 best-album lists from Slant Magazine, Consequence, Crack, Exclaim!, Paste, and The Quietus. A sequel, Pinball II, followed in 2025.

== Background and recording ==
Mike and Seltzer first met in 2017, when Mike was making May God Bless Your Hustle. Seltzer recalled that rapper Wiki probably introduced them at XL Studios; he went on to produce "Hunger" and "Forever Find Flight" for the mixtape. Their music moved in different directions afterward, but they stayed in contact and occasionally recorded together. They reconnected more regularly while Mike was working on Burning Desire. Mike made that album at home at the same time that he was recording at Seltzer's studio; he said that the separate locations helped him maintain the projects' contrasting moods.

Seltzer initially prepared restrained, sample-based beats that he thought would suit Mike. Mike instead asked for the harder instrumentals he associated with Seltzer's own style. Their first song from the renewed sessions was the album opener, "Two Door", built around heavy drums and a Memphis rap sample. "R&B" began as an exercise in making a different kind of song and prompted them to consider a full project. After their initial session, Mike generally returned every few weeks and completed one song per visit. He described the process as practice in finding different ways to write and rap, and said the pair accumulated roughly another album's worth of unused material.

Mike concentrated on rapping during the sessions, leaving Seltzer to record him, select sounds, and sequence the songs. Seltzer said that he would play Mike beats that he and other producers had made recently; Mike chose among them and usually wrote in the studio. Although Mike often produces his own records under the name DJ Blackpower, Seltzer stressed that Mike did not co-produce Pinball. He described the short song lengths as an outgrowth of the sessions: once they considered an idea complete, they moved to the next one rather than extending it.

The collaborators recorded "On God" in Atlanta while Mike was touring with Earl Sweatshirt and the Alchemist. Seltzer had arranged a session with Tony Shhnow; Earl Sweatshirt joined them, and the song was recorded early the following morning. For "Reminiscing", Mike wanted to work with Jay Critch, an artist he had followed for years, and Seltzer contacted the rapper to arrange the collaboration. The closing track, "2k24 Tour", originated with a sample that Laron had chopped. Seltzer kept its percussion sparse to leave room for Mike and guest rapper Niontay.

== Music and lyrics ==
Pinball is a hip-hop album. Dash Lewis of Pitchfork described Seltzer's production as a mixture of trap, drill, quiet storm, and snap music, with bright synthesizers, heavy drums, and open rhythmic space around the rappers and samples. Andre Gee of Rolling Stone called the project a substantial sonic shift from Mike's customary soul loops toward synth melodies and trap production. Writing for NPR, Sheldon Pearce interpreted the album as a direct engagement with trap aesthetics and as an example of Mike resisting the fixed expectations attached to his earlier work.

Lewis wrote that the production led Mike to vary his delivery, including by tightening his phrasing and changing the pitch and texture of his voice from track to track. Mike said the positive response gave him confidence to use AutoTue and search for unfamiliar flows and rhythmic pockets. He cited "Underground Kingz", "On God", and "Lethal Weapon" as songs on which he developed those approaches. Pearce similarly focused on the slurred cadences of "Skurrr" and "2k24 Tour", arguing that tone and movement carry as much meaning as individual lines.

The production changes repeatedly across the album's 11 short tracks. Lewis described "2k24 Tour" as spacious and orchestral, "Lethal Weapon" as a dense mixture of drill percussion and keyboards, and "Skurrr" as a playful trap song built around vocal effects. Vivian Medithi of the Fader contrasted the forceful beats of "On God", "100 Gecs", and "Yin-Yang" with the more open arrangements of "Underground Kingz" and "Lethal Weapon". Raphael Helfand, also writing for the Fader, characterized "R&B" as a slow jam that opens with a chopped and screwed passage before moving into a heavy kick-and-snare pattern and a siren-like synthesizer.

Reviewers regarded the album's subject matter as lighter than that of Mike's preceding work. Lewis found that Mike rapped more often about money, status, and his technical ability, but identified brief admissions of fear and uncertainty within the boasts. Pearce wrote that the album retains the compressed observations found across Mike's catalog while exchanging its usual pathos for gratification. Mike said that moving between the pensive Burning Desire sessions and the more exuberant Pinball material allowed him to express different parts of his life without treating them as incompatible.

== Release and artwork ==
Mike and Seltzer released "R&B" on February 14, 2024 as the album's lead single, with a music video directed by Jelani Miller. Mike told Rolling Stone that the sudden release reflected both his habit of issuing music unpredictably and his desire to control the presentation of his work. On March 5, they announced that Pinball would arrive the following day. Its release was accompanied by a video for "Underground Kingz". The digital edition contains 11 tracks and runs for 21 minutes and 24 seconds.

Vinny Fanta created the album artwork. Mike said that he and Seltzer worked with Fanta to choose a visual style that represented their collaboration. A CD edition was sold through Mike's Bandcamp page. In April 2025, Mike and Seltzer announced a second album, Pinball II; 10k released it on May 7. The label later paired the two albums in standard black and label-exclusive clear-vinyl editions of a gatefold double LP.

== Critical reception ==
Professional ratings
Review scores
Source	Rating
Pitchfork	8.0/10

Dash Lewis reviewed Pinball positively for Pitchfork, writing that its livelier sound expanded Mike's catalog without seeming unnatural. He praised Seltzer's ability to leave room inside busy instrumentals and Mike's willingness to reshape his voice for them, although he thought some of the concluding song "2k24 Tour" was less focused. Sheldon Pearce's NPR essay situated the album alongside Chief Keef and Mike Will Made It's Dirty Nachos as work by former teenage rap prodigies who developed outside the music industry's attention economy. He argued that Pinball demonstrated the creative freedom that Mike's independent career afforded him and found its looser presentation a refreshing challenge to his reputation as a solemn lyricist.

At the end of 2024, Paul Attard of Slant Magazine described Pinball as a concise and cohesive release whose trap production allowed Mike to sound unusually carefree. Robert Kazandjian of Crack similarly viewed it as a brief turn away from Mike's introspection toward energized boasts and psychedelic trap beats.

Other year-end entries emphasized the collaboration between the two artists. Sun Noor of Consequence praised the continuity between the short tracks and the playful tone created by its guests. Calum Slingerland of Exclaim! wrote that the record depended on Mike's ease over Seltzer's production, while Matt Mitchell of Paste found that the beats placed Mike's rapping in a more focused and urgent setting. Christian Eede of the Quietus described the album as buoyant while noting that its most confident songs still leave room for reflection.

=== Year-end lists ===
Year-end rankings for Pinball
Publication	List	Rank	Ref.
Slant Magazine	The 50 Best Albums of 2024	24	
Consequence	50 Best Albums of 2024	30	
Sputnikmusic	Staff's Top 50 Albums of 2024	36	
Crack	The 50 Best Albums of 2024	40	
Exclaim!	Exclaim!'s 50 Best Albums of 2024	44	
Paste	The 100 Best Albums of 2024	44	
The Quietus	The Quietus Albums of the Year 2024	60	
Consequence	20 Best Rap Albums of 2024	5	
Paste	The 20 Best Rap Albums of 2024	5	

== Track listing ==
Track listing and lengths are adapted from Bandcamp and Qobuz.

Pinball track listing
No.	Title	Featured artist(s)	Length
1.	"Two Door"		2:43
2.	"Lethal Weapon"		1:26
3.	"100 Gecs"		1:21
4.	"On God"	Earl Sweatshirt and Tony Shhnow	2:27
5.	"Skurrr"		1:47
6.	"Underground Kingz"		1:53
7.	"Yin-Yang"		1:41
8.	"R&B"		1:49
9.	"Reminiscing"	Jay Critch	1:49
10.	"Pinball"		1:21
11.	"2k24 Tour"	Niontay	3:07
Total length:			21:24

== Personnel ==
Credits are adapted from Qobuz.

- Mike – vocals
- Tony Seltzer – production, mixing
- Earl Sweatshirt – featured vocals (4)
- Tony Shhnow – featured vocals (4)
- Jay Critch – featured vocals (9)
- Niontay – featured vocals (11)
- Karma Kid – additional production (1)
- Vinny Fanta – additional production (4, 7, 8); artwork
- Mikey Fleece – additional production (4, 7, 8, 10)
- Tony Kurtis – additional production (8)
- Eddie Wayne – additional production (8)
- Dylvinci – additional production (9)
- Laron – additional production (11)
