= Faith Is a Rock =

Studio album by Mike, Wiki and the Alchemist
- Released: September 22, 2023
- Genre: Hip-hop
- Length: 31:39
- Label: ALC
- Producer: The Alchemist

Mike chronology
Beware of the Monkey (2022)	Faith Is a Rock (2023)	Burning Desire (2023)

Wiki chronology
Cold Cuts (2022)	Faith Is a Rock (2023)	14k Figaro (2023)

the Alchemist chronology
Voir Dire (2023)	Faith Is a Rock (2023)	Blacks & Whites (2024)

Professional ratings
Review scores
Source	Rating
Exclaim!	(positive)
Hive Magazine	4/5 stars
Pitchfork	7.6/10
Robert Christgau	B+

Faith Is a Rock is a collaborative studio album by American rappers Mike and Wiki, and record producer the Alchemist. The album was released on September 22, 2023 by The Alchemist's ALC label. Exclaim! ranked "Mayors A Cop" number 25 in their list of best songs of 2023.

== Track listing ==
All tracks are written by Patrick Morales and Michael Bonema. All tracks are produced by Alan Maman.

No.	Title	Length
1.	"Stargate"	3:27
2.	"Thug Anthem"	2:41
3.	"Mayors A Cop"	3:52
4.	"Bledsoe"	3:14
5.	"Pray For Him"	2:45
6.	"Odd Ways"	2:17
7.	"Scribble Jam"	2:54
8.	"Be Realistic"	4:20
9.	"Memory Loss"	2:31
10.	"One More"	3:38
Total length:		31:39

"Odd Ways", "Be Realistic" and "One More" first appeared on the 2022 EP One More
