= Chlothegod =

American singer-songwriter

- Born: Chloe Chavis; Fayetteville, North Carolina, U.S.
- Genres: Neo-soul; alternative rock; alternative R&B
- Years active: 2017–present
- Label: EQT
- Website: chlothegod.com

Chloe Chavis, known professionally as Chlothegod, is an American singer-songwriter from Fayetteville, North Carolina.

== Life and career ==
Chloe Chavis was born and raised in Fayetteville, North Carolina. Her father was in the military, and she moved to different places growing up as a military brat. Chavis graduated from Terry Sanford High School, where she tried musical theatre and acting before deciding to pursue music at the age of 15; she said that whilst she liked to express herself, she wanted to tell her own story and not someone else's. In 2017, whilst attending college, Chavis released her debut extended play (EP), The Story Behind. The EP and the track "See Me" garnered attention, leading her and a friend to organize a ten-date city tour. Her second EP, Statement, was released in 2018. By early 2021, Chavis had become frustrated with her lack of recognition and success and planned to leave her music career behind, but still felt compelled to record. Later that year, she relocated from Fayetteville to Los Angeles after being contacted by EQT Recordings and performed a virtual concert opening for Latto as part of Sprite's Live from the Label series. In 2022, she featured on the Curtis Waters song "Riot".

Chlothegod's debut single through EQT, "Camille", was released in February 2023. In October, she released her third EP, Nearly Straight, which she supported with a North American tour supporting Amindi. In January 2024, she opened for Baby Tate at The Echo in Los Angeles. In July, she made her debut festival appearance performing at the Broccoli City Festival in Washington, D.C., and performed at ColorsxStudios' inaugural Tones Of event at the Knockdown Center in Queens, New York City in October. In February 2025, Chlothegod released her fourth EP, I Feel Different Every Day. A deluxe edition of the EP with four additional tracks was released on April 14, 2025. Chlothegod embarked on her debut headline tour across the United States for eight weeks in support of the EP and supported Orion Sun across several dates in May 2025. In September, she performed at Aminé's Best Day Ever Festival in Troutdale, Oregon.

== Artistry ==
Chlothegod's musical style has been described as blending various musical styles and influences, and considered hard to categorize. Growing up, she listened to artists including Erykah Badu, Lauryn Hill, Jill Scott and India Arie, as well as alternative artists that her dad liked, such as G. Love & Special Sauce, No Doubt, Gorillaz, and Yellowcard. Complex's Olive Soki-Kavwahirehi described Nearly Straight as blending neo soul and alternative rock, whilst Chris Sanley of KEXP-FM described I Feel Different Every Day as combining influences of "guitar-driven pop", R&B, hip-hop, and punk rock.

== Personal life ==
Chlothegod is queer.

== Discography ==
=== Extended plays ===
List of EPs, with selected details
Title	EP details
The Story Behind (Note: Unlisted)	Released: June 1, 2017; Label: Self-released; Format: DD
Statement	Released: 2018; Label: Self-released; Format: DD
Nearly Straight	Released: October 13, 2023; Label: EQT; Format: CD, LP, DD
I Feel Different Every Day	Released: February 7, 2025; Label: EQT; Format: LP, DD

=== Singles ===
List of singles as lead artist, showing year released and album name
Title	Year	Album
"Communicate"	2019	Non-album singles
"Stylist" (feat. TiaCorine)	2020	Non-album singles
"I Don't Mind"	2020	Non-album singles
"Camille"	2023	Nearly Straight
"Bless Your Heart"	2023	Nearly Straight
"Outta My Mind"	2023	Nearly Straight
"My Bad, My Fault"	2023	Nearly Straight
"UGOMDN" (A Colors Show)	2023	Non-album singles
"Good Guys pt. 2" (feat. Amindi)	2024	Non-album singles
"UGODMN pt. 2" (feat. Mick Jenkins)	2024	Non-album singles
"Outta My Mind pt. 2" (feat. Lola Young)	2024	Non-album singles
"Digging Around"	2024	I Feel Different Every Day
"My GF H8s Me"	2024	I Feel Different Every Day
"What's So Funny"	2025	I Feel Different Every Day (Deluxe)
"Keep My Name Out Your Mouth" (demo)	2025	Non-album single

=== Music videos ===
List of music videos, with directors, showing year released along with albums
Title	Year	Director	Album	Ref.
"See Me"	2017	Brandon Noel	The Story Behind	
"Camille"	2023	N/A	Nearly Straight	
"Bless Your Heart"	2023	G-O	Nearly Straight	
"Outta My Mind"	2023	Jake Wolfert	Nearly Straight	
"My Bad, My Fault"	2023	G-O	Nearly Straight	
Good Guys pt. 2"	2023	N/A	Non-album singles	
"UGOMDN pt. 2"	2024	N/A	Non-album singles	
"Outta My Mind pt. 2"	2024	N/A	Non-album singles	
"Digging Around"	2024	Josh Nesmith	I Feel Different Every Day	
"My GF H8s Me"	2025	Josh Nesmith	I Feel Different Every Day	
"I Know What Everyone Says About Me"	2025	Josh Nesmith	I Feel Different Every Day	
"I Feel Different Every Day"	2025	Josh Nesmith	I Feel Different Every Day	
