= Alife Rivington Club =

Shoe store in Manhattan, New York, USA

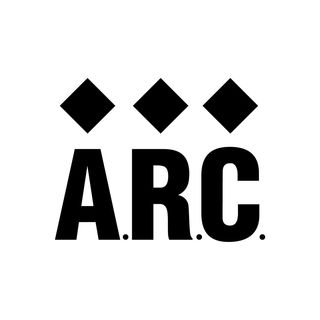
- Company type: Shoe store
- Defunct: April 1, 2021
- Headquarters: Lower East Side of Manhattan
- Products: Sneakers
- Brands: Nike and Adidas etc.
- Website: aliferivingtonclub.com

Alife Rivington Club was a shoe store located on the Lower East Side of Manhattan. Alife Rivington Club sold newly released, exclusive and limited-edition sneakers from companies such as Nike and Adidas. The store was located at 158 Rivington St. Alife Rivington Club was meant to have "a Harvard Club feel." The store featured mahogany cubbies for each shoe, leather couches, and an outdoor courtyard.

The Alife Rivington Club closed on April 1, 2021.
