= Mike (musician) =

American rapper (born 1998)

MIKE
- MIKE performing in 2026

Background information
- Also known as: DJ Blackpower; Dr. Grabba
- Born: Michael Jordan Bonema; October 13, 1998 (age 28); Livingston, New Jersey, U.S.
- Origin: New York City
- Genres: East Coast hip-hop; alternative hip-hop; abstract hip-hop; experimental hip-hop
- Occupations: Rapper; songwriter; record producer
- Years active: 2014–present
- Labels: Lex; Marathon Artists; 10k

Michael Jordan Bonema (born October 13, 1998), known professionally as MIKE (stylized in all caps), and also known as DJ Blackpower & Dr. Grabba, is an American rapper, songwriter and record producer based in New York City. Bonema's atypical upbringing—having experienced life in New Jersey, London, Philadelphia and New York City—has had an audible influence on his diverse and experimental music style.

Bonema launched his professional career via his Bandcamp page in 2015. He gained interest from listeners, journalists and industry executives alike as he released several short-run EPs, his first critically reviewed mixtape, Winter New York, and his first full-length project, Longest Day, Shortest Night. Bonema then experienced a break-out year in 2017, as he became recognised within hip-hop circles via his next full-length project, entitled May God Bless Your Hustle, in June 2017.

Bonema then released several follow-up projects, including Black Soap in May 2018, quickly followed by Renaissance Man in June 2018 and War in My Pen in December 2018. He has continued to gain external interest from the likes of Pitchfork, The Fader and The New Yorker for his lyricism, music production and cultural influence.

Bonema is a co-founder of Slums (stylised as [sLUms].), an online-focused, underground hip-hop collective consisting of himself, Adé Hakim, Jodi.10k (formerly Jazz Jodi), Darryl Johnson, King Carter and Mason Dreiling. He currently releases his music through his own independent record label and publishing company, 10k.

== Early life ==
Michael Jordan Bonema was born on October 13, 1998, in Livingston, New Jersey. He spent his early years in New Jersey, before moving to England at age 5, where his mother thought he would receive better educational opportunities. Bonema spent five years growing up in Hackney, London, where he claimed he was "stripped away from American culture and pushed into British culture". At age 10, Bonema first became interested in making music after listening to the English Grime artist Skepta. At age 12, Bonema returned to Philadelphia with his father, where he continued to experience and learn about American hip-hop culture. At age 16, he re-settled to The Bronx with his father, before moving to Brooklyn, eventually founding Slums with his friends.

== Musical career ==
=== 2008–2014: Early interest in hip-hop ===
Whilst living in England in 2008, a young Bonema first gained interest in hip-hop by watching the music videos of Skepta, Chipmunk and N-Dubz with his mother and older sisters. He also states that he was surrounded by Contemporary R&B artists like Chingy and Bow Wow in his early life, as he "lived in a house with lots of girls".

In 2010, upon Bonema's return to Philadelphia, he began to gain a more comprehensive interest in the culture behind hip-hop. He began to familiarise himself with the emerging American hip-hop scene, stating he studied the works of artists like Chance the Rapper, Drake and Lil Wayne. Bonema recorded his first-ever song, a cover of MF Doom and Madlib's underground hit 'All Caps', in 2012. Bonema reflects on the song as being inspired by his lifestyle in Philadelphia, having an aggressive vocal energy and acting as a simple exercise in discovering how to express himself as a 14-year-old. As Bonema grew older, he began to develop his own tastes in hip-hop and started following artists like Tyler, the Creator, Earl Sweatshirt and other members of the Odd Future collective. By 2013, Bonema started to take hip-hop more seriously, and began releasing music, emailing journalists within the industry and directly communicating with record executives.

=== 2015: Founding Slums ===
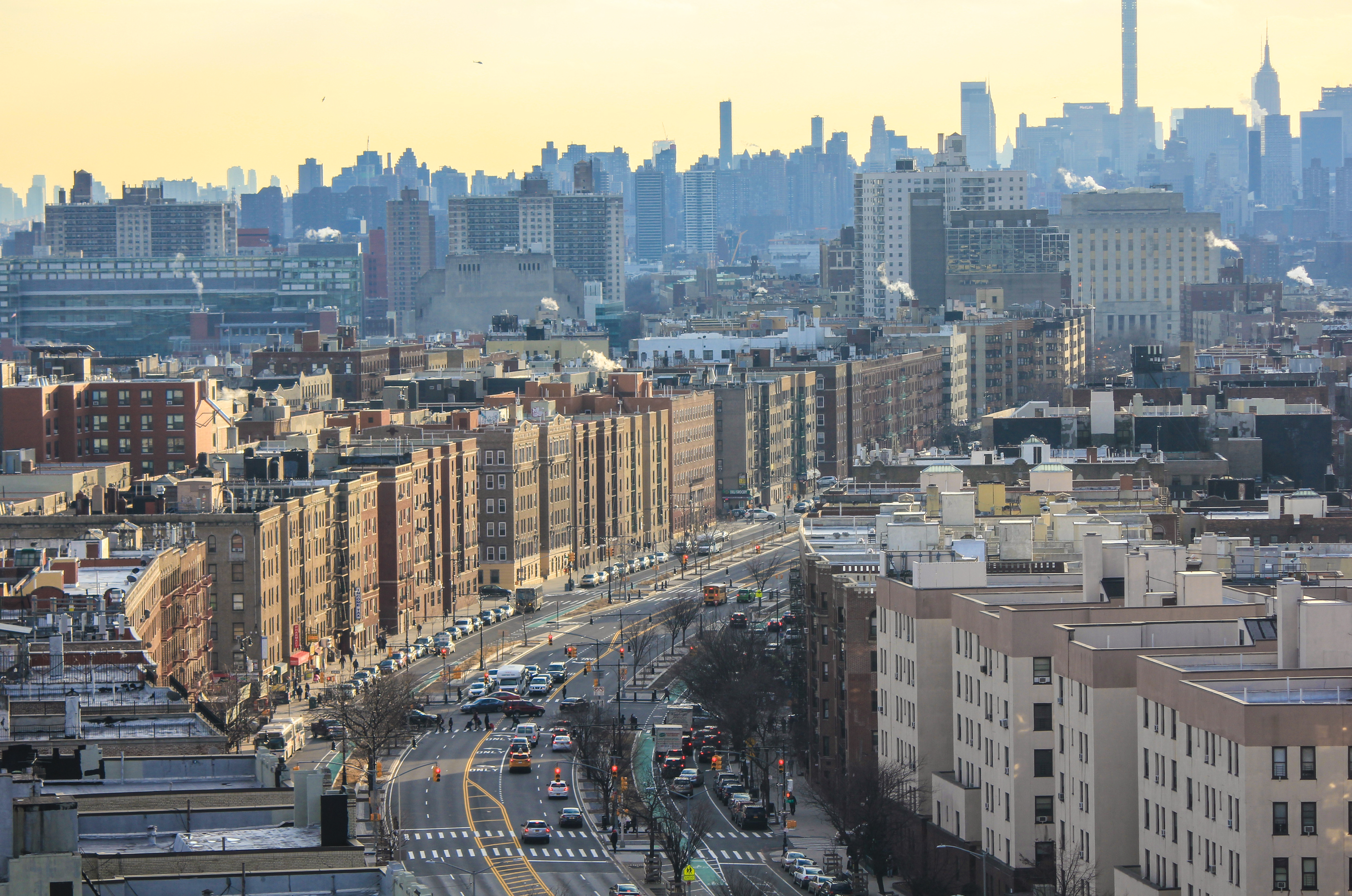
Bonema has spent his formative years with friends and family in The Bronx.

Bonema released his first-ever project, a six-track EP entitled Belgium Butter, to his Bandcamp in January 2015. Bonema states that he made this project mostly for himself, as he was trying to figure out his place in the community and rebuild self-confidence.

Around this time, Bonema was searching for independence and stability, so he co-founded an underground hip-hop group called Slums. He states the group, which consists of like-minded New York City artists Adé Hakim, aJodi.10k, Darryl Johnson, King Carter and Mason Dreiling, was an important moment in his life where he "felt good to be around people that he felt like he understood.

Bonema released two more short-run EPs throughout 2015 – Crimson EP and RAFA (running away from the ajogun), the latter of which demonstrated his renewed focus on collaborating with other members of Slums.

Bonema also worked on his breakout mixtape, Winter New York, in a shared New York City apartment with Slums throughout the year. He described the mixtape, which was centred around youth culture in New York City, as "figuring out what self-worth and confidence meant... to be able to tell my story and the stories of people I know to help somebody else".

=== 2016: Meeting Earl Sweatshirt ===
Bonema followed up his breakout mixtape in February, releasing a four-track EP entitled Jungle Boy, based on the concept of New York City representing a "jungle".

He then began working on his next project, entitled Longest Day, Shortest Night, which was released in June. He then released two more short-run EPs to end the year, including The Ones Who Were Made By Time in September and Tonight, With You in December.

Around this time, Bonema established a connection to Earl Sweatshirt, who he describes as his "favorite rapper", after he purchased one of his projects on Bandcamp. Bonema states that they formed a mentor and mentee relationship, as Sweatshirt provided him advice on making music, learning to express himself and how to support himself as a "young black boy in America".

Bonema also learned to produce music in 2016, as his friend and fellow Slums member, Sixpress, taught him how to use the digital audio workstation Ableton Live. He says it was important as it allowed him to take full creative control of his music and be able to "100 percent" reflect and express what he was feeling.

=== 2017: Making May God Bless Your Hustle ===
Bonema started working on a new mixtape, initially called By The Water, towards the beginning of 2017. He delayed the project due to artistic challenges, stating he wanted the project to reflect who he was, but was struggling as his "mind wasn't in the right place" and he felt like he wasn't being true to himself. Bonema's mother inadvertently motivated him to restart work on the project, as she posted "May God Bless Your Hustle" on his Instagram. He states that his mother's phrase perfectly summarized his situation, as he knew he was struggling with his independent life in New York City, but also knew his extended support network was continuously sending him "blessings", "gifts" and "positive energy".

Bonema continued to work on the project throughout the year, recording half of the songs at his home in Bedford–Stuyvesant whilst recording the other half at XL Recordings in Lower Manhattan. In June, he released the completed project as a pay what you want download on his Bandcamp, thanking several people within his support network, including his mother, father, sisters, Sweatshirt and members of Slums, for their contributions.

Bonema continued the year by starting work on his commercial debut, a self-produced, short-player entitled By The Water EP.

=== 2018–2021: Black Soap, Renaissance Man, War in My Pen, Tears of Joy, Weight of the World, and Disco! ===
Bonema began to work on his next project, Black Soap, whilst living independently in London at the start of 2018. He started to roll out the project in April, as he released the lead single "Time Ain't Enough", shared a music video produced by 10k Productions and provided a full list of the project's collaborators, including Standing on the Corner, Darryl Johnson, Adé Sayed, and his mother, Anu Akinbobye. He made the project available in May, which he described as "made with passion, love, and community", via online streaming, digital downloads and physical copies through Bandcamp.

Bonema then focused on his follow-up project, Renaissance Man, which was released on the one-year anniversary of his breakout album, May God Bless Your Hustle, in June. Shortly after, Bonema announced a further project, titled War in My Pen, to be released in December. He stated it would be a 13-track effort produced by DJ Blackpower, featuring New York City-based artists and Slums affiliates Medhane, Sage Elesser and King Carter, as well as London-based artists Jadasea and Redlee. The project was released independently through Bonema's own record label 10k.

Bonema, alongside BbyMutha, Na-Kel Smith, Liv.e and Black Noi$e, was announced as a support act for Earl Sweatshirt's Fire It Up! tour in January. Sweatshirt launched the tour in March, performing across several locations within the United States and England throughout the three-month tour.

On June 21, 2019, Bonema released Tears of Joy and Weight of the World on June 21, 2020. In July 2019, Bonema launched the Young World festival, an annual festival held at Herbert Von King Park in Brooklyn, New York.

On October 31, 2020, Bonema released his debut EP BLP2020: "King of the Night" under the alias DJ Blackpower. A second EP under the same alias, titled BLP2021: "For Ur Own Good", was released in early 2021.

Bonema released Disco! on June 21, 2021, peaking at number 98 on the Billboard Top Current Album Sales chart.

=== 2022–2024: One More, Beware of the Monkey, Faith Is A Rock, Burning Desire and Pinball ===
On October 13, 2022, Bonema announced Beware of the Monkey, released on December 21, 2022. The first album single, "nuthin i can do is wrng", was released on October 13, 2022. The second single, "What Do I Do?", was released on November 3, 2022. The third and last single, "Stop Worry" featuring Sister Nancy, was released on November 29, 2022. The project was originally supposed to be released in the summertime, but Bonema "was trying to stop worrying about the gluttonous stuff that comes with releasing a project and [instead] worrying about whether the music sounds cohesive.” It turned out to be the longest he had worked on an album to date.

Bonema collaborated with Wiki and The Alchemist to release an EP titled One More on November 25, 2022. They then released a full-length collaborative album titled Faith Is a Rock on September 22, 2023. He then released his 12th solo album titled Burning Desire on October 13, 2023. Later that month, Mike released Dr. Grabba, the third album under his producer alias, DJ Blackpower, on October 31, 2023.

Bonema collaborated with Tony Seltzer to release an album titled Pinball on March 6, 2024. Bonema would later spend three months touring Europe and the United States between late February and late May 2024.

=== 2025–present: Showbiz!, Pinball II and Pompeii // Utility. ===
On January 31, 2025, Bonema released his album Showbiz!, described as "his most refined, spiritual-sounding album to date" by Pitchfork. Later in the year, on May 7, 2025, he collaborated with Tony Seltzer a second time to release an album titled Pinball II. He spent three months between late February to late May 2025 on his Artist of the Century tour across Europe and the United States. Bonema, featuring Mark William Lewis and Liv.e among other musicians, performed an NPR Music Tiny Desk Concert, released on August 7, 2025.

On April 3, 2026, Bonema released a collaborative album with Earl Sweatshirt titled Pompeii // Utility. The album was produced by Surf Gang and features tracks recorded between 2023 and 2025. Bonema and Max B are scheduled to headline the Young World festival in Brooklyn, New York in July 2026.

== Artistry ==
Bonema has been described as hip-hop's newest "wunderkind" and was branded as one of the most important figures in contemporary hip-hop by the likes of Pitchfork, The Fader and The New Yorker. He is characterised primarily by his voice, which has been classified as "monotone and muffled", as well as his "intoxicatingly slow" vocal delivery, his "preternatural sense" of understanding rhythmic technique and his "signature blend" of lo-fi drum beats and contorted jazz loops. He also been praised as a "natural-born storyteller" that can effectively share observations, thoughts and confessions about trying to exist as an adolescent.

=== Influences ===
Bonema states his earliest influence was Skepta, whilst also citing MF Doom, Chance the Rapper, Drake, Lil Wayne and Tyler, the Creator as major contributors to his sound. He also cites Sade, King Krule and mentor Earl Sweatshirt as important influencers regarding his writing style, as he appreciates how they make "real life music" where the "simple stuff hits you the hardest". Bonema's support of MF Doom helped influence his stage name, MIKE, as the alias developed through his first recorded song where he rapped, 'Something, something, something, write my name in all caps like DOOM did'.

Bonema regards Between the World and Me by Ta-Nehisi Coates and Punkzilla by Adam Rapp as important books that improved his creative processes. He states they were important as they taught him how to use music as a medium to express himself.

Bonema also cites the women in his life, including his mother, older sisters and school teachers, as major inspirations. He states that the title of his break-out mixtape, May God Bless Your Hustle, was inspired by a phrase his mother used to say to him.

== Personal life ==
Bonema recalls that his childhood was difficult, having to "adjust over and over again" each time he moved between Livingston, London, Essex, Philadelphia and New York City. He also states that he started to distance himself and avoid communicating with others because it was "too much work". He often reflects on his mental health issues, stating he first dealt with depression as a 14-year-old, as it "was a weird time" where he was forced to be independent and didn't know much about self-worth. He also states he experienced anxiety at school as he was "around too many people" and was "being told to do things".

Bonema remains close with his family, as he consistently visits his New York-based sisters, contacts his Philadelphia-based father and kept in touch with his late mother, who died in 2019, despite her living in Nigeria, although he wasn't able to visit because of "paperwork issues". He also positively reflects on his relationship with Earl Sweatshirt, stating he "understands how we express ourselves" and has spent time teaching him about life.

Bonema says music is the most important part of his life, as the stage is the only place he feels comfortable. He further states that he struggles to communicate his feelings face-to-face, but is able to "translate it through different forms". Bonema prefers to release music via Bandcamp, but has started to release select projects to SoundCloud, Spotify and Apple Music.

Bonema is a pescatarian stating after visiting London in 2022: "All the OGs out here are either vegan or pescatarian." In September 2025, Bonema joined the No Music for Genocide boycott to geo-block his music from all music streaming platforms in Israel in protest of the Gaza genocide.

== Discography ==
=== Studio albums ===
List of studio albums, with selected details and chart positions
Title	Details	Peak chart positions
Title	Details	US Current Album Sales
Longest Day, Shortest Night	Released: June 20, 2016; Label: self-released; Formats: Digital download	—
May God Bless Your Hustle	Released: June 21, 2017; Label: self-released; Formats: LP, Digital download, streaming	—
Black Soap	Released: May 25, 2018; Label: Lex; Formats: CD, LP, digital download, streaming	—
Weight of the World	Released: June 21, 2020; Label: 10k; Formats: CD, digital download, streaming	—
Disco!	Released: June 21, 2021; Label: 10k; Formats: CD, LP, digital download, streaming	98
Faith Is a Rock (with Wiki and The Alchemist)	Released: September 22, 2023; Label: ALC Records; Formats: Digital download, streaming	—
Burning Desire	Released: October 13, 2023; Label: 10k; Formats: Digital download, streaming	—
Pinball (with Tony Seltzer)	Released: March 6, 2024; Label: 10k; Formats: Digital download, streaming	—
Showbiz!	Released: January 31, 2025; Label: 10k; Formats: Digital download, streaming	—
Pinball II (with Tony Seltzer)	Released: May 7, 2025; Label: 10k; Formats: Digital download, streaming	—
Pompeii // Utility (with Earl Sweatshirt and Surf Gang)	Released: April 3, 2026; Label: 10k, Tan Cressida, Surf Gang Records; Formats: Digital download, streaming	—

=== Mixtapes ===
Title	Album information
Winter New York	Released: December 22, 2015; Label: self-released; Formats: Digital download
Renaissance Man	Released: June 21, 2018; Label: Lex; Formats: CD, LP, digital download, streaming
War in My Pen	Released: December 21, 2018; Label: 10k; Formats: CD, digital download, USB flash drive, streaming
Tears of Joy	Released: June 21, 2019; Label: 10k; Formats: Digital download, streaming
Beware of the Monkey	Released: December 21, 2022; Label: 10k; Formats: CD, LP, Digital download, streaming

=== Extended plays ===
Title	EP information
Belgium Butter	Released: January 19, 2015; Label: self-released; Formats: digital download
Crimson	Released: May 31, 2015; Label: self-released; Formats: digital download
RAFA (Running Away from Ajogun)	Released: August 11, 2015; Label: self-released; Formats: digital download
Jungle Boy	Released: February 25, 2016; Label: self-released; Formats: digital download
The Ones Who Were Made by Time	Released: September 8, 2016; Label: self-released; Formats: digital download
Tonight, with You	Released: December 21, 2016; Label: self-released; Formats: digital download
By the Water	Released: September 6, 2017; Label: Marathon Artists; Formats: digital download
Resistance Man	Released: February 15, 2018; Label: self-released; Formats: digital download
BLP2020 "King of the Night" (as DJ Blackpower)	Released: October 31, 2020; Label: 10k; Formats: CD, digital download
BLP2021 "For Ur Own Good" (as DJ Blackpower)	Released: February 14, 2021; Label: self-released; Formats: digital download
One More (with Wiki and The Alchemist)	Released: November 25, 2022; Label: ALC Records; Formats: digital download
Dr. Grabba (as DJ Blackpower)	Released: October 31, 2023; Label: 10k; Formats: digital download, streaming
Dr. Grabba II (as DJ Blackpower)	Released: February 14, 2025; Label: 10k; Formats: digital download, streaming

=== Singles ===
==== As lead artist ====
List of singles, with year released and album name
Title	Year	Album
"Numbered Dayz"	2019	Non-album single
"Nothing2say (Never Forget)"	2020	Non-album single
"Evil Eye"	2021	Disco!
"Crystal Ball"	2021	Disco!
"In My World"	2021	Non-album single
"Makeda"	2022	Non-album single
"Nuthin i can do is wrng"	2022	Beware of the Monkey
"What Do I Do?"	2022	Beware of the Monkey
"Stop Worry!" (featuring Sister Nancy)	2022	Beware of the Monkey
"Red Jacket 6"	2023	Non-album single
"Mayors A Cop" (featuring Wiki)	2023	Faith Is A Rock
"R&B" (featuring Tony Seltzer)	2024	Pinball
"Pieces Of A Dream"	2024	Showbiz!
"You're the Only One Watching"	2024	Showbiz!
"Bear Trap"	2025	Showbiz!
"Prezzy" (featuring Tony Seltzer)	2025	Pinball II
"WYC4" (featuring Tony Seltzer)	2025	Pinball II
"Minty" (featuring Surf Gang)	2026	Pompeii // Utility
"Back Home" (featuring Surf Gang)	2026	Pompeii // Utility

==== As featured artist ====
List of singles, with year released and album name
Title	Year	Album
"Numb" (JWords featuring MIKE)	2020	Sín Señal
"Promised" (Wiki featuring MIKE)	2021	Half God
"Wheredeyat???" (Niontay featuring MIKE)	2023	Dontay's Inferno
"Sentry" (Earl Sweatshirt, The Alchemist featuring MIKE)	2023	Voir Dire
"Real hiphop" (Niontay featuring El Cousteau, MIKE and Earl Sweatshirt)	2023	Demon Muppy
"No Amends" (RealYungPhil featuring MIKE)	2024	Non-album single
"Signal" (redLee featuring Jadasea and MIKE)	2024	Stop On Red Signal
"Been Had" (Na-Kel Smith featuring MIKE)	2024	Non-album single
"Blind" (12k Gotti featuring MIKE)	2025	800°
"Day x2" (Venna featuring MIKE and Marco Bernardis)	2025	Malik
"Leadbelly" (Earl Sweatshirt and Surf Gang featuring MIKE)	2026	Pompeii // Utility
"Dontsweatit!" (Mike Shabb featuring MIKE)	2026	Sewaside IV

=== Guest appearances ===
List of non-single guest appearances, with other performing artists, showing year released and album name
Title	Year	Artist(s)	Album
"Community service"	2015	Sixpress	Skinny P
"Iced brew"	2015	Sixpress	Skinny P
"Gritty 98"	2015	Sixpress	Blaklip
"Connect"	2015	Sixpress	Blaklip
"Game boy"	2017	Sixpress	On the Road, Sunny Path
"Stuck in the scene"	2017	Sixpress	On the Road, Sunny Path
"Enchantment"	2018	Navy Blue	From the Heart...
"Outlet"	2018	Pink Siifu	ensley
"Shine on me!"	2019	Navy Blue	Gangway for Navy
"Carlos"	2019	Navy Blue	Gangway for Navy
"Run It Up"	2019	King Carter	Prayer Ain't Enough
"After Thoughts"	2019	King Carter	Prayer Ain't Enough
"If I Ain't Have Grace"	2019	Camden Malik	More Than Ca$h
"Vibe Wit Me"	2020	Camden Malik, Darryl 10k, Diani, King Carter	Spaceship Symphonies
"Vrrydrrty_2"	2020	Sideshow, ZelooperZ	Farley
"Round 4"	2020	Goya Gumbani	GG & Bori Steps Across the Pond
"Tight Leash"	2020	Black Noi$e	Oblivion
"George"	2020	Jodi.10k, Aida, Osman, Cleo Reed	Yungbull
"Mike's Track"	2021	gum.mp3	Gum's Mixtape
"Lossless"	2021	The Alchemist	This Thing of Ours 2
"Mike's Track"	2021	Dirty Bird	Dirty Bird
"ATL Freestyle"	2022	Popstar Benny, Niontay	Album* (Deluxe)
"Dip"	2022	Camden Malik	Faithfully
"Real Love"	2022	Anysia Kym	Soliloquy
"HP Sport"	2022	Sideshow	Wegahta Tapes Vol. 1
"Peace Out"	2023	Jadasea	The Corner: Vol. 1
"Bless"	2023	The Alchemist, Sideshow	Flying High
"Like Mike"	2023	Mkyfm	23
"Celibate"	2023	Danny Brown	Quaranta
"u kno who u are"	2024	Salimata	Wooden Floors
"Short Stories"	2024	Jawnino	40
"Brown Paper Bag"	2024	El Cousteau	Merci, Non Merci
"In Doubt"	2024	Anysia Kym	Truest
"Best Odds!"	2024	redLee, Jadasea	Stop On Red Signal
"MoreThanBRILLIANT!"	2025	Bfb Da Packman, Starlito	Thats Brilliant!
"Frontline Souljahs"	2025	WiFiGawd	The Dynasty
"Thinkin' I Won't"	2025	Camden Malik, DvntBeats	Paperweight
"Blow Hendry"	2025	Westside Gunn	Heels Have Eyes 2
"You got time and I got money"	2025	Smerz, Elias Rønnenfelt, Fousheé, Zack Sekoff	Big city life EDITS
"Shibuya Flex"	2025	Awich, RZA, 454	Okinawan Wuman
"Triple Nickel"	2025	Mavi	The Pilot
"Like or Repost"	2026	Omari Lyesight	Digital
"Collateral"	2026	Jadasea	Holly Grove
