= Showbiz! =

2025 album by Mike

Studio album by Mike
- Released: January 31, 2025
- Recorded: 2024–2025
- Studio: Mike's home
- Genre: Hip-hop
- Length: 47:42
- Label: 10k
- Producers: DJ Blackpower; Harrison; Darryl Johnson; Anysia Kym; Laron; Thelonious Martin; RedLee; Jacob Rochester; Salami Rose Joe Louis; Shungu

Mike chronology
Pinball (2024)	Showbiz! (2025)	Pinball II (2025)

Singles from Showbiz!
- 1. "Pieces of a Dream" Released: October 18, 2024; 2. "You're the Only One Watching" Released: November 29, 2024; 3. "Bear Trap" Released: January 17, 2025

Showbiz! is the seventh studio album by American rapper Mike, released on January 31, 2025 via 10k. It features guest appearances from Venna, 454, duendita, and Surf Gang. Mike primarily handled production under his DJ Blackpower alias, with additional contributions from Thelonious Martin, RedLee, and Louis Shungu, among others. The album was released to positive critical reception.

== Release ==
On October 18, 2024, Mike released the album's first single, "Pieces of a Dream", alongside a music video. He also announced the #AOTC Tour, to begin on February 27, 2025 in Dublin and conclude on May 31, 2025 in New York City. On November 29, 2024, Mike announced the announced the album's release alongside its second single and music video, "You're the Only One Watching". The album's third single, "Bear Trap", was released on January 17, 2025 with a music video. On January 30, 2025 Mike released a double music video for "Man In The Mirror" and "Artist Of The Century." A deluxe edition of the album, featuring live recordings from his Tiny Desk performance, was released on December 11, 2025.

== Critical reception ==
Professional ratings
Aggregate scores
Source	Rating
Metacritic	81/100
Review scores
Source	Rating
The Guardian	4/5 stars
Paste	8.3/10
Pitchfork	8.3/10
Slant Magazine	3.5/5 stars

According to the review aggregator Metacritic, Showbiz! received "universal acclaim" based on a weighted average score of 81 out of 100 from 8 critic scores.

Dash Lewis of Pitchfork described the album as Mike's "most spiritual-sounding album, full of '80s boogie bands pitch-shifted to resemble gospel choirs, reverberant saxophones reaching up to the heavens, and keyboards that shine like parting clouds at dawn." The Guardian's Will Pritchard praised the album's lyrics, writing: "his lyrics, often written freely in streams of consciousness, sit in cosy corners of cut-and-stitched samples, comparable with the drifting verses of his friend and mentor Earl Sweatshirt or the smoother edges of Buffalo's Westside Gunn." Writing for Slant Magazine, Paul Attard wrote that the album "with its rough-edged aesthetic and fragmented presentation" felt like "the culmination of years spent turning ongoing pain into poetry." J. Krueger of Consequence wrote that the album "boasts 24 tracks of woozy, left-field beats; contemplative bars delivered from deep in the pocket; and a relaxed but attention-demanding tone." Arusa Qureshi's review for The Quietus concludes that the album "is significant not only for underlining Mike's continued evolution as a rapper and composer, but also as a producer and beat-maker." Writing for Hypebeast, Elaina Bernstein describes Mike as "introspective as ever before" on the album, with him posing "hard questions about himself and the world around him." Raphael Helfand of The Fader writes that Mike "brings a raw creative process and an openness with which he addresses the most painful, intimate details of his personal life, his mic a conduit through which complex emotions and awe-striking insights flow." Grant Sharples of Paste glazed the album's production, describing it as "a tapestry of woozy samples, shimmering keyboards, and shapeshifting drums" that "orbits his unmistakable voice, built on a compelling hybrid of somnambulant delivery and dextrous wordplay."

=== Year-end lists ===
Publication	Accolade	Rank	Ref
Consequence	The 50 Best Albums of 2025	22	
Consequence	The 25 Best Rap Albums of 2025	7	
The Fader	The 50 best albums of 2025	32	
Gorilla vs. Bear	Albums of 2025	34	
HotNewHipHop	The 40 Best Rap Albums of 2025	17	
Paste	The 50 best albums of 2025	31	
Paste	The 25 best rap albums of 2025	13	
Pitchfork	The 50 Best Albums of 2025	45	
Rolling Stone	The 100 Best Albums of 2025	54	
Rolling Stone	The 25 Best Hip-Hop Albums of 2025	6	
The Quietus	Albums of the Year 2025	81	
Time Out	The 25 best albums of 2025	12	

== Track listing ==
All tracks are written by Michael Bonema and produced by DJ Blackpower, except where noted.

No.	Title	Writer(s)	Producer(s)	Length
1.	"Bear Trap"	Bonema; Darryl Johnson	DJ Blackpower; Johnson	2:50
2.	"Clown of the Class (Work Harder)"	Bonema; Jacob Rochester	Rochester	1:16
3.	"Then We Could Be Free.."			1:28
4.	"Watered Down"			1:52
5.	"Man in the Mirror"			1:51
6.	"Artist of the Century" (featuring Venna)	Bonema; Malik Venner		2:53
7.	"What U Bouta Do?/A Star was Born" (featuring 454)	Bonema; Anysia Kym Batts; Willie Wilson	DJ Blackpower; Anysia Kym	2:30
8.	"Belly 1" (featuring Surf Gang)	Bonema; Harrison Sutherland	Harrison	1:37
9.	"Da Roc"			1:20
10.	"The Weight (2k20)"			1:16
11.	"Lost Scribe"	Bonema; Louis Shungu	DJ Blackpower; Shungu	1:36
12.	"You're the Only One Watching"			2:05
13.	"Lucky"			2:15
14.	"#82"	Bonema; Shungu	DJ Blackpower; Shungu	1:56
15.	"Too Hot (interlude)"			0:53
16.	"Pieces of a Dream"			2:38
17.	"Strange Feeling"			2:01
18.	"Zombie pt.2"	Bonema; Lindsay Rose Olsen	Salami Rose Joe Louis	1:37
19.	"Burning House"	Bonema; Rochester; Malcolm Martin	Rochester; Thelonious Martin	3:00
20.	"Showbiz! (Intro)"	Bonema; Laron Wages	Laron	2:02
21.	"Spun Out"			2:32
22.	"Miss U" (featuring duendita)	Bonema; Venner; Candace Camacho; Jeremy McCoulsky	DJ Blackpower; RedLee	2:32
23.	"When it Rains"	Bonema; Wages	Laron	1:58
24.	"Diamond Dancing (Broke)"	Bonema; Venner		2:35
Total length:				47:42

All tracks are written by Michael Bonema and produced by Band of the Century.

Deluxe edition (bonus tracks)
No.	Title	Length
1.	"Intro - Tiny Desk Version"	0:32
2.	"Burning Desire - Tiny Desk Version"	1:34
3.	"Man in the mirror - Tiny Desk Version"	1:50
4.	"Artist of the Century - Tiny Desk Version"	1:42
5.	"Evil Eye - Tiny Desk Version"	2:02
6.	"World Market (Mo' Money) - Tiny Desk Version"	2:01
7.	"Diamond Dancing (Broke) - Tiny Desk Version"	2:28
8.	"Leaders of Tomorrow - Tiny Desk Version"	1:52
9.	"Nite Flite - Tiny Desk Version"	0:59
10.	"Parks - Tiny Desk Version"	2:19
11.	"What Do I Do? - Tiny Desk Version"	4:26
Total length:		69:17

=== Notes ===
- "You're the Only One Watching" features spoken word by Anuoluwapo Sandra Akinboboye.
