= Hip Hop 50 =

Media Project by Mass Appeal

Hip Hop 50 is a media project by Mass Appeal to celebrate the 50th anniversary of hip hop. The project is planned to include documentary films, EPs, podcasts, and other media.

== Music ==
In November 2021, Mass Appeal announced Hip Hop 50 the Soundtrack, a series of 10 EP records highlighting various subgenres of hip hop.

=== Volume 1 ===
Volume 1 highlights the early days of hip hop and is produced by DJ Premier. The EP was announced on July 11, 2022 and released on July 15.

All music is composed by DJ Premier.

No.	Title	Writer(s)	Length
1.	"Lettin' Off Steam" (featuring Joey Bada$$)	A. Markeith Reid; Chris Martin; Jo-Vaughn Virginie Scott	3:26
2.	"Remy Rap" (featuring Remy Ma & Rapsody)	Martin; Remy Mackie; Marlana Evans	2:46
3.	"Beat Breaks" (featuring Nas)	Martin; Nasir Jones	2:39
4.	"Terrible 2's" (featuring Run the Jewels)	Martin; Jaime Meline; Michael Render	2:52
5.	"The Root of All" (featuring Slick Rick & Lil Wayne)	Martin; Dwayne Carter; Ricky M.L. Walters	2:17
Total length:			14:02

=== Volume 2 ===
Volume 2 highlights East Coast hip hop and is produced by Swizz Beatz. The EP was announced on April 11, 2023 and released on April 21.

All music is composed by Swizz Beatz.

No.	Title	Writer(s)	Length
1.	"Runaway" (featuring Nas)	Aaron Livingston; Kasseem Dean; Nasir Jones	3:00
2.	"This Shit Right Here" (featuring Lil Wayne)	Dwayne Carter; Dean	2:37
3.	"Take ‘Em Out" (featuring Jadakiss, Benny the Butcher & Scar Lip)	C. Parker; F. Scruggs; Jason Phillips; Jeremie Pennick; K. Jones; L. Parker; S. Sterling; T. Taylor; Dean	4:24
4.	"City Sound Like" (featuring Fivio Foreign & Bandmanrill)	Avery Chambliss; Maxie Lee Ryles III; Siril Pettus; Dean	3:07
5.	"Say Less" (featuring Lil Durk & A Boogie Wit Da Hoodie)	Avery Chambliss; Artist Dubose; Durk Banks; Dean	2:54
6.	"Khalas" (featuring Jay Electronica)	Andy Bey; Elpadaro F. Electronica Allah; Dean	3:19
Total length:			19:24

== Documentaries ==
In May 2021, Showtime announced a collaboration with Mass Appeal to produce a number of documentaries to celebrate the anniversary. Released in December 2021, You're Watching Video Music Box, focuses on the television program Video Music Box and its host Ralph McDaniels. Ricky Powell: The Individualist chronicles photographer Ricky Powell and his touring with the Beastie Boys. Rolling Like Thunder follows Roger Gastman on the history of contemporary graffiti. Push It, named after the Salt-n-Pepa song, covers the contributions of women in hip hop. Hits From the Bong follows the history and impact of the hip hop group Cypress Hill. Supreme Team looks into the New York City gang of the same name.

Other planned Showtime projects include a documentary on Biz Markie, and on SoundCloud hip hop.

== Live events ==
In June 2022, Live Nation announced a partnership with Mass Appeal to create hip hop events, such as festivals, live DJ sessions, interactive experiences, and pop-up shops. At the 65th Annual Grammy Awards, a 50 Years of Hip-Hop concert was performed. In June 2023, Live Nation announced a number of tours and events. Events include the F.O.R.C.E. Live Tour featuring LL Cool J, The Roots, DJ Jazzy Jeff, and DJ Z-Trip; the Final Lap Tour featuring 50 Cent, Busta Rhymes, and Jeremih; the N.Y State of Mind Tour featuring Wu-Tang Clan and Nas; and Hip Hop 50 Live at Yankee Stadium featuring Run-DMC, Lil Wayne, Snoop Dogg, Ice Cube, Eve, Lil Kim, Remy Ma, Trina, T.I., Fat Joe, Common, EPMD, Ghostface Killah, Lupe Fiasco, Slick Rick, DJ Kool Herc, Grandmaster Caz, Kurtis Blow, Melle Mel, Roxanne Shante, the Sugarhill Gang, Clark Kent, Marley Marl, Mannie Fresh, and Battlecat.

== Other projects ==
On Juneteenth 2023, ABC documentary series Soul of a Nation released an episode titled "Hip-Hop @ 50: Rhythms, Rhymes & Reflections", featuring various hip hop artists, producers, and executives throughout history.

In January 2023, Mass Appeal announced a partnership with Sony Music to highlight their R&B and hip hop digital catalog program. Mass Appeal and Sony Music announced a photography exhibition dedicated to hip-hop history at Fotografiska New York titled “Hip-Hop: Conscious, Unconscious”, running from January 2023 to May 2023.

In March 2023, Sean Diddy Combs announced a partnership between Hip Hop 50 and Cîroc, naming it as the official vodka for the anniversary. In April, Google Pixel announced a partnership with Mass Appeal and Live Nation to celebrate women in hip hop.

In June 2023, the Rock and Roll Hall of Fame announced a new exhibit titled "Holla If Ya Hear Me" celebrating the 50th anniversary of hip hop.

== Support ==
A portion of all proceeds from the project will be donated to the various charitable organizations, including the Universal Hip Hop Museum. The Google Pixel partnership includes a contribution to Femme it Forward's Next Gem Femme mentorship program, a content series re-imagining five classic records by women, and an interactive exhibit at Rolling Loud.
