= Disco! =

Studio album by Mike
- Released: June 21, 2021
- Genre: Hip-hop
- Length: 43:12
- Label: 10k
- Producer: DJ Blackpower

Mike chronology
Weight of the World (2020)	Disco! (2021)	Beware of the Monkey (2022)

Singles from Disco!
- 1. "Evil Eye" Released: April 13, 2021; 2. "Crystal Ball" Released: May 13, 2021

Disco! is the fifth studio album by American rapper Mike. It was released via 10K on June 21, 2021. It has received generally favorable reviews from critics. It peaked at number 98 on the Billboard Top Current Album Sales chart.

== Critical reception ==
Professional ratings
Aggregate scores
Source	Rating
Metacritic	79/100
Review scores
Source	Rating
HipHopDX	3.9/5
Flood Magazine	8/10
Pitchfork	8.0/10
Spectrum Culture	80%
Spin	favorable
Stereogum	favorable

At Metacritic, which assigns a weighted average score out of 100 to reviews from mainstream critics, the album received an average score of 79, based on 4 reviews, indicating "generally favorable reviews".

Dylan Green of Pitchfork gave the album an 8.0 out of 10, stating, "It's less a singing-and-dancing, public reclamation of self than it is a silent disco, a reminder that introspection and consistency can break any curse." Tomas Miriti Pacheco of Spin commented that "the progression of both his sorrow and his musical technique can be traced across the album's diverse tracks." Pranav Trewn of Stereogum wrote, "He is a conduit for a broad coalition of voices that speak across the album, taking in their perspectives and reflecting them back out like the disco ball that obscures his face on the cover."

=== Accolades ===
Publication	Accolade	Rank	Ref.
NPR	50 Best Albums of 2021	39	
Okayplayer	21 Best Albums of 2021	7	
Paste	40 Best Hip-Hop Albums of 2021	N/A	
Pitchfork	50 Best Albums of 2021	16	
PopMatters	20 Best Hip-Hop Albums of 2021	6	

== Track listing ==
All tracks were produced by Mike, under his production alias dj blackpower.

No.	Title	Length
1.	"Evil Eye"	2:08
2.	"Alarmed!" (featuring Sideshow)	2:36
3.	"Leaders of Tomorrow (Intro)"	2:58
4.	"Center City"	1:50
5.	"Big Love"	3:34
6.	"Aww (Zaza)"	2:01
7.	"Ghoulish"	1:46
8.	"Babyvillain (In Our Veins)"	2:38
9.	"At Thirst Sight by Assia"	3:14
10.	"Frogville (MK Ultra)"	2:32
11.	"Endgame"	1:31
12.	"World Market (Mo' Money)"	2:54
13.	"Crystal Ball"	1:37
14.	"Sandra"	3:09
15.	"Tailwind"	1:57
16.	"Airdrop"	1:53
17.	"Spiral/Disco (Outro)"	4:54
Total length:		43:12

- "Alarmed!", "Ghoulish", "At Thirst Sight by Assia", and "Tailwind" are stylized in lowercase letters
- "At Thirst Sight by Assia" features vocals from singer Assia

== Charts ==
Chart	Peak position
US Top Current Album Sales (Billboard)	98
