= Na-Kel Smith =

American skateboarder and musician (born 1994)

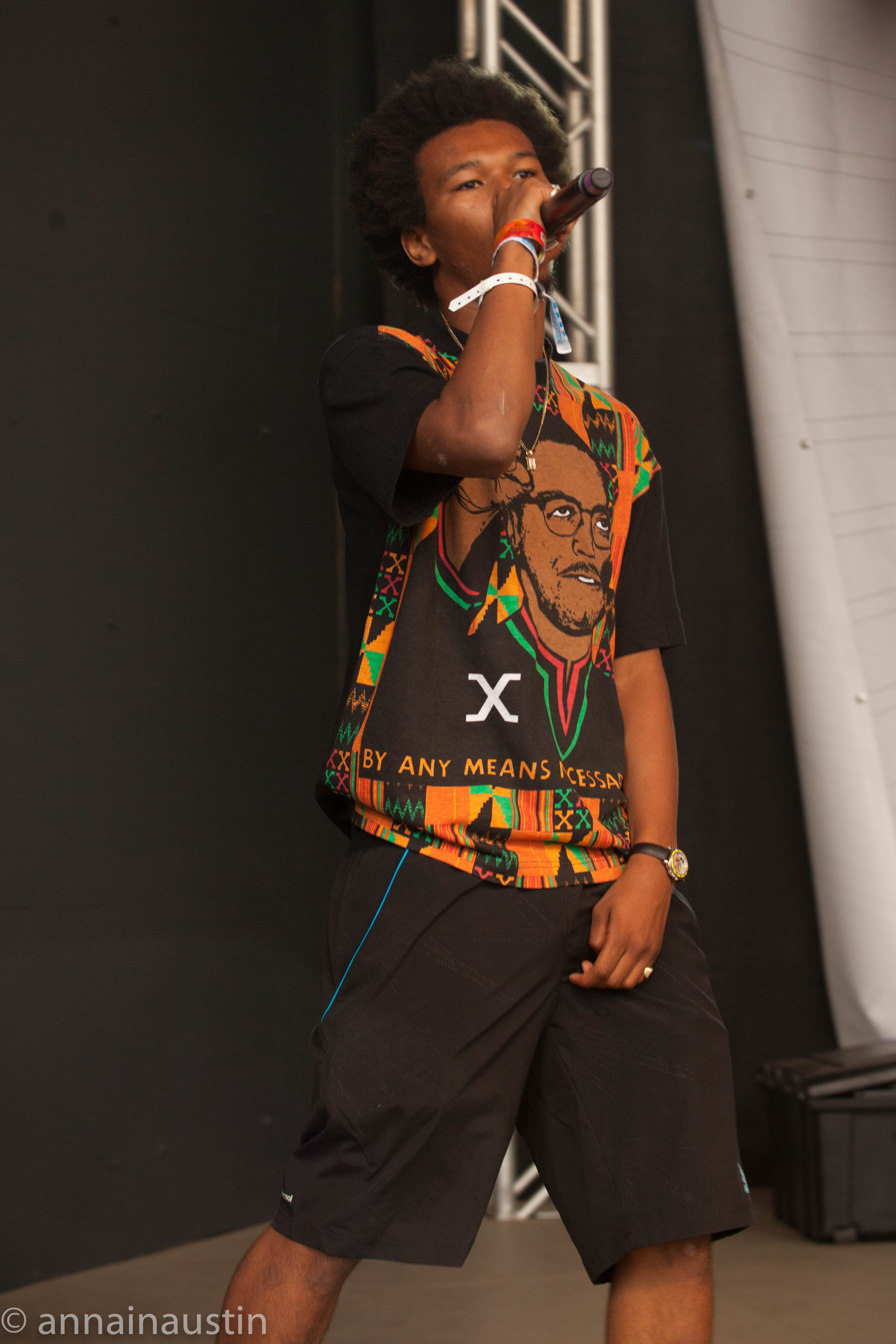
- Smith at SXSW in 2015

Background information
- Born: Na-Kel Allah Smith; July 22, 1994 (age 32); Los Angeles, California, U.S.
- Genres: Hip hop; industrial hip-hop
- Occupations: Skateboarder; rapper; songwriter; actor
- Years active: 2013–present
- Labels: A Dream No Longer Deferred; Narcowave
- Formerly of: Odd Future

Na-Kel Allah Smith (born July 22, 1994), is an American skateboarder, rapper, songwriter and actor. Originally a skateboarder from the Los Angeles area, he was known for his association with the hip hop collective Odd Future, appearing in music videos, vlogs and their Adult Swim TV show Loiter Squad, and performing live with the collective and its members.

== Career ==
Smith debuted his music career in 2013, marking his first recorded verse on Tyler, the Creator's second studio album Wolf on the posse cut "Trashwang". In 2014, after his appearance in the Supreme video "Cherry", Smith co-founded his own hardware/apparel company, Hardies, with teammate Tyshawn Jones. In 2015, he formed Hog Slaughta Boyz, a duo composed of Smith and former Odd Future member Earl Sweatshirt. In 2018, Smith starred in his first commercial film, Mid90s, directed by Jonah Hill. In 2019, Smith released his debut studio album Twothousand Nakteen through A Dream No Longer Deferred Records and Narcowave.

Smith is the nephew of professional skateboarder Kareem Campbell.

== Discography ==
=== Studio albums ===
- Twothousand Nakteen (2019)
- 3000nakteen (2019)
- Mr. Made It Off of Western (2020)
- A Dream No Longer Deferred (2021)
- Skullface Bonehead (2022)
- + (2022)
- + + Mix2 -_- (2022)
- HML.mX 3D (2022)
- Racecarstuntman222 (2022)
- Free Pops FR (2023)
- Stand Alone Stuntman (2023)
- NAK (2026)

=== Extended plays ===
- Racecarstuntman (2021)
- African American Death Dodger (2022)
- Life Is Hard but Not as Hard as Me (2022)
- Im OTW (2025)

=== Singles ===
==== As lead artist ====
List of singles as lead artist, showing year released and album name
Title	Year	Album
"SilenceDArapgame" (with Earl Sweatshirt, as Hog Slaughta Boyz)	2015	Non-album singles
"Blooming"	2016	Non-album singles
"Go to Work"	2017	Non-album singles
"Warzone"	2017	Non-album singles
"Demon Slayer"	2017	Non-album singles
"Pnuemonia"	2017	Non-album singles
"Stop Hating Start Trying"	2017	Non-album singles
"BAL/NAQ/DAW"	2017	Non-album singles
"Add It Up" (featuring Enwhytj)	2018	Non-album singles
"White Tee"	2018	Non-album singles
"Watch It Work"	2018	Non-album singles
"A Love Song For You"	2018	Non-album singles
"Ntro"	2019	3000nakteen
"Seductive Dancer"	2020	Non-album singles
"C4"	2020	Non-album singles
"Challey Rock"	2021	Skullface Bonehead
"Moshpitmargiel"	2022	Non-album singles
"Stop Hating/Start Trying"	2022	Non-album singles
"Challey Creep+++"	2022	Racecarstuntman222
"Free Pops"	2023	Free Pops FR
"Been Had" (featuring Mike)	2024	NAK
"Lessons"	2025	NAK

==== As featured artist ====
List of singles as featured artist, showing year released and album name
Title	Year	Album
"Smoke & Mirrors" (Eyedress featuring Na-Kel Smith, BoofPaxkMooky and Cashcache!)	2022	Full Time Lover
"Been at the Spot" (BoofPaxkMooky featuring Na-Kel Smith)	2023	Non-album singles
"Pound/Left Right" (Mercury featuring Na-Kel Smith)	2023	Non-album singles
"Talk 2 Me Nice" (QP KO featuring Na-Kel Smith)	2024	Non-album singles

=== Guest appearances ===
List of non-single guest appearances, with other performing artists, showing year released and album name
Title	Year	Artist(s)	Album
"Trashwang"	2013	Tyler, the Creator, Jasper, Lucas, L-Boy, Taco, Left Brain, Lee Spielman	Wolf
"DNA"	2015	Earl Sweatshirt	I Don't Like Shit, I Don't Go Outside
"Life of a Young Nigga Vol. 7 Intro"	2015	Enwhytj	—N/a
"Principalities"	2016	Mad Max	—N/a
"No Games"	2016	Lil' Jumpoff, Ryder	—N/a
"Interviews"	2016	Frank Ocean, Ryan Moore, Ibrahim Hariri, Sage Elsesser, Evan Clark, Nabil Hariri	Blonde
"Too High"	2018	Leven Kali, Buddy	I Get High When I Think About Us
"Dirt"	2020	Pink Siifu	Negro
"Snowing"	2020	Zelooperz	Valley of Life
"Puppy"	2020	Kahlil Blu	DOG
"Either Way"	2020	BbyMutha	Muthaland
"Boss Up"	2020	MadeinTYO	Never Forgotten
"Wait on You"	2021	Jay Worthy, Leven Kali	Two4Two
"Vivica"	2021	Sideshow	Wicked Man's Reprise
"Titanic"	2022	Earl Sweatshirt	Sick!
"Over Everythinking"	2022	TheGoodPerry	Mr.GoodBad&Ugly
"Bodega Bandit"	2022	AG Club	Impostor Syndrome
"Kelly Green"	2022	Valee	Vacabularee
"U Still There"	2024	Vayda	Vaytrix
"New Money"	2025	Eyedress, N8noface	Stoner
"QueenBootyAthenaAphrodite"	2025	HiTech, Vayda, Milfie, Planet KaiA	Honeypaqq Vol. 1
"Back LA"	2026	Earl Sweatshirt, Mike, Surf Gang	Pompeii // Utility

== Filmography ==
=== Film ===
Year	Title	Role	Notes	Produced By	Reference
2014	"Illegal Civilization 2"	Himself	Skate Video	Mikey Alfred	
2014	"Wet Dream"	Himself	Skate Video	Federico Vitetta	
2014	"Joyride"	Himself	Skate Video	Bill Strobeck; Sage Elsesser	
2014	"Cherry"	Himself	Skate Video	Supreme	
2016	Away Days	Himself	Skate Video	Adidas Skateboarding	
2017	Pussy Gangster	Himself	Skate Video	Supreme; Bill Strobeck	
2018	Mid90s	Ray	Feature Film	Jonah Hill, Eli Bush, Ken Kao, Scott Rudin, Lila Yacoub	
2018	"Blessed"	Himself	Skate Video	Supreme	
2019	"Boys Of Summer 2"	Himself	Skate Video	Logan Lara	
2020	"Godspeed"	Himself	Skate Video	Davonte Jolly	

=== Television ===
Year	Title	Role	Notes
2012–2014	Loiter Squad	Himself	

=== Music videos ===
Year	Title	Album	Role	Notes
2011	"B.S.D" by Tyler, the Creator featuring Jasper Dolphin and Taco	Goblin	Himself	
2012	"Rella" by Hodgy Beats, Domo Genesis, and Tyler, the Creator	The OF Tape Vol. 2	Himself	
2012	"Oldie" by Odd Future	The OF Tape Vol. 2	Himself	
2013	"Whoa" by Earl Sweatshirt featuring Tyler, the Creator	Doris	Himself	
2017	"Sunflower" by Rex Orange County		Himself	
2018	"Too High" by Leven Kali featuring Na-Kel Smith and Buddy	I Get High When I Think About Us	Himself	
2020	"Tens Into Benjamins" by Matt Ox and Na-Kel Smith		Himself	
