= Tony Shhnow =

American rapper (born 1995)

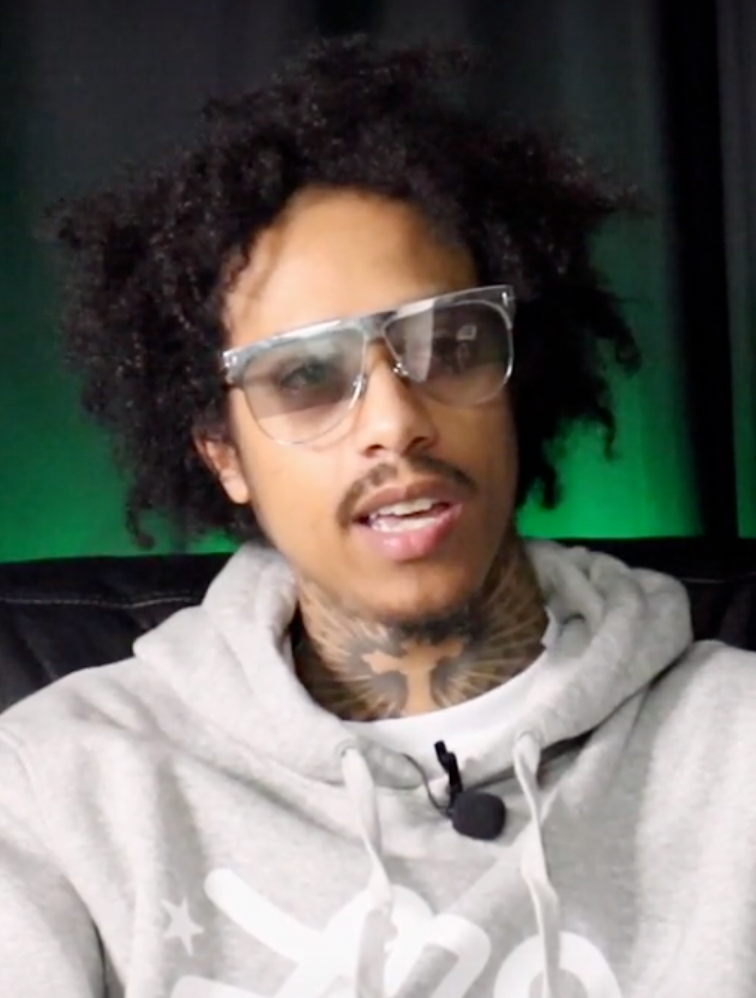
- Tony Shhnow in August 2022

Background information
- Born: Carrington Jaylen Andrew Wilson; December 27, 1995 (age 30); Los Angeles, California
- Origin: Atlanta, Georgia
- Genres: Hip hop; trap; plugg
- Occupations: Rapper; singer; songwriter
- Instrument: Vocals
- Years active: 2016–present

Carrington Jaylen Andrew Wilson (born December 27, 1995), known professionally as Tony Shhnow, is an American rapper and songwriter from Atlanta, Georgia. He is recognized as a pioneer of the plugg subgenre of trap music and as a veteran of the hip hop underground scene.

== Career ==
In 2019, Wilson released his debut mixtape Da World Is Ours. In 2020, he began gaining traction in the hip hop scene with the release of his mixtape Kill Streak. In January 2022, he released his mixtape Kill Streak 2. Later that month, he released the deluxe version of his mixtape alongside a music video for one of the new tracks titled "Slow Crash". In May 2022, he released a his single "Last Chance" with Detroit rapper ZelooperZ, an artist who he is noted as being stylistically similar to. Again in May 2022, he released the music video for his track "Keep In Touch". In June 2022, he released his single "Bape" with rapper Bear1Boss. During the track he interpolates Soulja Boy's hit track Crank That. Again in June 2022, he appeared on Father's album Young Hot Ebony 2 on the track "Only Built 4 Hermès Linx". In September 2022, he appeared on North Carolina rapper TiaCorine's album I Can't Wait on the track "Boogie". In October 2022, he released his single "Life N Hard Times". Again in October 2022, he released a music video for his single "Can't Say I'm Broke".

== Musical style ==
David Aaron Blake writing for HipHopDX describes Wilson's musical style on his mixtape Reflexions in the following manner: "There’s an apathetic confidence behind all of Shhnow’s music, as though he’s frustrated by how easy rapping is for him. A simple song structure bores him. He euro-steps between several different flows on the rage-inspired “Park My Car,” cramming multitudes of ideas into a less than two-minute song. All rappers must balance their raps’ style with its content, but Reflexions highlights Shhnow’s insistence that the sound of his music is as compelling as any lyric."
