= Burning Desire (album) =

Studio album by Mike
- Released: October 13, 2023
- Genres: Abstract hip-hop; psychedelic hip-hop; cloud rap; vaporwave
- Length: 50:32
- Label: 10k
- Producers: DJ Blackpower; Gawd; Laron

Mike chronology
Faith Is a Rock (2023)	Burning Desire (2023)	Pinball (2024)

Burning Desire is the sixth studio album by American rapper Mike. It was released on October 13, 2023, through 10k and features guest appearances by Earl Sweatshirt, Klein, Lila Ramani of Crumb, and Larry June, amongst others.

== Background and promotion ==
The album came only weeks after the release of his collaborative studio album Faith Is a Rock with Wiki and The Alchemist. Ahead of its release, little was known about the album with the exception of a few billboards advertising the album in New York and London in late September 2023, making it a surprise release to most. Accompanying the album release, Mike shared an Alex Huggins-directed music video for the song "What U Say U Are" on October 13. Both album and video were promoted at an album release event at Roxy Cinema in New York City. Mike promoted the album through a 51-date tour from February to May 2024 in Europe and North America.

== Critical reception ==
Professional ratings
Review scores
Source	Rating
AllMusic	4.5/5 stars
HipHopDX	4.4/5
Pitchfork	8.1/10

Zachary Horvath of HotNewHipHop viewed the album as a "very complex but fun listen", pertaining to "dark romantic horror with comedic twists" about "revenge and devastation". Andrew Sacher at BrooklynVegan praised the combination of "stream-of-consciousness screeds" with "sun-kissed jazz and soul samples" that the rapper turns into a "mind-bending concoction", always showcasing his "hazy, abstract rap". Writing for The Fader, Arielle Lana LaJarde thought Mike is "stepping into his role as a leader", inviting the listener to "his most self-assured work to date".

Reviewing the album for AllMusic, Fred Thomas called it, "one of the strongest points in [Mike's] prolific output, showcasing his distinctive flows and beatmaking style in a way that's slightly more accessible than earlier work, but still maintaining an inherent rawness" and concluded that, "He's still ahead of his time in 2023, but Burning Desire is the kind of rule-breaking music that tends to be looked back on years later as where entire genres shifted." Writing for Pitchfork, Brandon Callender praised the album's themes, writing: "Burning Desire moves between chest-puffing bombast and Mike's characteristic rumination, sometimes within the same breath. While angst and grief remain recurring subjects, here he chooses to honor loved ones instead of framing past hardships as insurmountable." Wesley McLean's review for HipHopDX praised Mike's lyricism on the album, writing: "Mike consistently crafts deeply affecting lyrics, whether it be general reflections on life and the world around him or detailing honest, intimate contemplations on the weight of loss or self-doubt."

== Track listing ==
All tracks are written by Michael Bonema, except where noted. All tracks are produced by Mike (credited as "DJ Blackpower"), except "African Sex Freak Fantasy", produced by Gawd, and "Snake Charm", produced by Laron.

Burning Desire track listing
No.	Title	Writer(s)	Length
1.	"Intro with Klein" (featuring Klein)		1:40
2.	"Dambe"		1:46
3.	"Zap!"		2:14
4.	"African Sex Freak Fantasy"		1:48
5.	"Snake Charm"		1:23
6.	"Plz Don't Cut My Wings" (featuring Earl Sweatshirt)	Bonema; Thebe Kgositsile	3:38
7.	"Real Love with Fashionspitta"	Bonema; Fashionspitta	1:37
8.	"U Think Maybe?" (featuring Liv.e and Venna)	Bonema; Hailee Olivia Williams	2:29
9.	"Zombie"	Bonema; Elijah Fox; Immanuel Simelane; Malik Venner	1:33
10.	"Set the Mood"		1:42
11.	"Billboards with Anuoluwapo "Sandra" Majekodunmi"		2:06
12.	"98"		1:19
13.	"Do You Believe?"		1:29
14.	"Burning Desire"		1:48
15.	"They Don't Stop in the Rain" (with Taka)	Bonema; William Craig Thomas	2:42
16.	"Baby Jesus"		1:48
17.	"Ho-Rizin"		2:02
18.	"Mussel Beach" (with El Cousteau and Niontay)	Bonema; Niontay Hicks	3:23
19.	"Sixteens"		2:00
20.	"Should Be!" (featuring Lila Ramani)	Bonema; Lila Ramani	2:21
21.	"What U Say U Are"		3:22
22.	"Golden Hour" (featuring Larry June)	Bonema; Larry Eugene Hendricks III	2:39
23.	"Playtime (Interlude)"		0:41
24.	"Let's Have a Ball" (featuring Mark William Lewis)	Bonema; Mark William Lewis	3:02
Total length:			50:32
