= Critical race theory =

Conceptual framework

Critical race theory (CRT) is a conceptual framework developed to understand the relationships between social conceptions of race and ethnicity in the United States, social and political laws, and mass media. CRT also considers racism to be systemic in various laws and rules, not based only on individuals' prejudices. The word critical in the name is an academic reference to critical theory, not criticizing or blaming individuals.

CRT is also used in sociology to explain social, political, and legal structures and power distribution as through a "lens" focusing on the concept of race, and experiences of racism. For example, the CRT framework examines racial bias in laws and legal institutions, such as highly disparate rates of incarceration among racial groups in the United States. A key CRT concept is intersectionality—the way in which different forms of inequality and identity are affected by interconnections among race, class, gender, and disability. Scholars of CRT view race as a social construct with no biological basis. One tenet of CRT is that disparate racial outcomes are the result of complex, changing, and often subtle social and institutional dynamics, rather than explicit and intentional prejudices of individuals. CRT scholars argue that the social and legal construction of race advances the interests of white people at the expense of people of color, and that the liberal notion of U.S. law as "neutral" plays a significant role in maintaining a racially unjust social order, where formally color-blind laws continue to have racially discriminatory outcomes.

CRT began in the United States in the post–civil rights era, as 1960s landmark civil rights laws were being eroded and schools were being re-segregated. With racial inequalities persisting even after civil rights legislation and color-blind laws were enacted, CRT scholars in the 1970s and 1980s began reworking and expanding critical legal studies (CLS) theories on class, economic structure, and the law to examine the role of US law in perpetuating racism. CRT, a framework of analysis grounded in critical theory, originated in the mid-1970s in the writings of several American legal scholars, including Derrick Bell, Alan Freeman, Kimberlé Crenshaw, Richard Delgado, Cheryl Harris, Charles R. Lawrence III, Mari Matsuda, and Patricia J. Williams. CRT draws on the work of thinkers such as Antonio Gramsci, Sojourner Truth, Frederick Douglass, and W. E. B. Du Bois, as well as the Black Power, Chicano, and radical feminist movements from the 1960s and 1970s.

Academic critics of CRT argue it is based on storytelling instead of evidence and reason, rejects truth and merit, and undervalues liberalism. Since 2020, conservative US lawmakers have sought to ban or restrict the teaching of CRT in primary and secondary schools, as well as relevant training inside federal agencies. Advocates of such bans argue that CRT is false, anti-American, villainizes white people, promotes radical leftism, and indoctrinates children. Advocates of bans on CRT have been accused of misrepresenting its tenets and of having the goal to broadly censor discussions of racism, equality, social justice, and the history of race.

== Definitions ==
In his introduction to the comprehensive 1995 publication of critical race theory's key writings, Cornel West described CRT as "an intellectual movement that is both particular to our postmodern (and conservative) times and part of a long tradition of human resistance and liberation." Law professor Roy L. Brooks defined critical race theory in 1994 as "a collection of critical stances against the existing legal order from a race-based point of view".

Gloria Ladson-Billings, who—along with co-author William Tate—had introduced CRT to the field of education in 1995, described it in 2015 as an "interdisciplinary approach that seeks to understand and combat race inequity in society." Ladson-Billings wrote in 1998 that CRT "first emerged as a counterlegal scholarship to the positivist and liberal legal discourse of civil rights."

In 2021, Khiara Bridges, a law professor and author of the textbook Critical Race Theory: A Primer, defined critical race theory as an "intellectual movement", a "body of scholarship", and an "analytical toolset for interrogating the relationship between law and racial inequality."

The 2021 Encyclopaedia Britannica described CRT as an "intellectual and social movement and loosely organized framework of legal analysis based on the premise that race is not a natural, biologically grounded feature of physically distinct subgroups of human beings but a socially constructed (culturally invented) category that is used to oppress and exploit people of colour."

== Tenets ==
Scholars of CRT say that race is not "biologically grounded and natural"; rather, it is a socially constructed category used to oppress and exploit people of color; and that racism is not an aberration, but a normalized feature of American society. According to CRT, negative stereotypes assigned to members of minority groups benefit white people and increase racial oppression. Individuals can belong to a number of different identity groups. The concept of intersectionality—one of CRT's main concepts—was introduced by legal scholar Kimberlé Crenshaw.

Derrick Albert Bell Jr. (1930 – 2011), an American lawyer, professor, and civil rights activist, wrote that racial equality is "impossible and illusory" and that racism in the US is permanent. According to Bell, civil-rights legislation will not on its own bring about progress in race relations; alleged improvements or advantages to people of color "tend to serve the interests of dominant white groups", in what Bell called "interest convergence". These changes do not typically affect—and at times even reinforce—racial hierarchies. This is representative of the shift in the 1970s, in Bell's re-assessment of his earlier desegregation work as a civil rights lawyer. He was responding to the Supreme Court's decisions that had resulted in the re-segregation of schools.

The concept of standpoint theory became particularly relevant to CRT when it was expanded to include a black feminist standpoint by Patricia Hill Collins. First introduced by feminist sociologists in the 1980s, standpoint theory holds that people in marginalized groups, who share similar experiences, can bring a collective wisdom and a unique voice to discussions on decreasing oppression. In this view, insights into racism can be uncovered by examining the nature of the US legal system through the perspective of the everyday lived experiences of people of color.

According to Encyclopedia Britannica, tenets of CRT have spread beyond academia and are used to deepen understanding of socio-economic issues such as "poverty, police brutality, and voting rights violations", that are affected by the ways in which race and racism are "understood and misunderstood" in the United States.

== Common themes ==
Richard Delgado and Jean Stefancic published an annotated bibliography of CRT references in 1993, listing works of legal scholarship that addressed one or more of the following themes: "critique of liberalism"; "storytelling/counterstorytelling and 'naming one's own reality'"; "revisionist interpretations of American civil rights law and progress"; "a greater understanding of the underpinnings of race and racism"; "structural determinism"; "race, sex, class, and their intersections"; "essentialism and anti-essentialism"; "cultural nationalism/separatism"; "legal institutions, critical pedagogy, and minorities in the bar"; and "criticism and self-criticism". When Gloria Ladson-Billings introduced CRT into education in 1995, she cautioned that its application required a "thorough analysis of the legal literature upon which it is based".

=== Critique of liberalism ===
First and foremost to CRT legal scholars in 1993 was their "discontent" with the way in which liberalism addressed race issues in the US. They critiqued "liberal jurisprudence", including affirmative action, color-blindness, role modeling, and the merit principle. Specifically, they claimed that the liberal concept of value-neutral law contributed to maintenance of the US's racially unjust social order.

An example questioning foundational liberal conceptions of Enlightenment values, such as rationalism and progress, is Rennard Strickland's 1986 Kansas Law Review article, "Genocide-at-Law: An Historic and Contemporary View of the Native American Experience". In it, he "introduced Native American traditions and world-views" into law school curriculum, challenging the entrenchment at that time of the "contemporary ideas of progress and enlightenment". He wrote that US laws that "permeate" the everyday lives of Native Americans were in "most cases carried out with scrupulous legality" but still resulted in what he called "cultural genocide".

In 1993, David Theo Goldberg described how countries that adopt classical liberalism's concepts of "individualism, equality, and freedom"—such as the United States and European countries—conceal structural racism in their cultures and languages, citing terms such as "Third World" and "primitive".

In 1988, Kimberlé Williams Crenshaw traced the origins of the New Right's use of the concept of color-blindness from 1970s neoconservative think tanks to the Ronald Reagan administration in the 1980s. She described how prominent figures such as neoconservative scholars Thomas Sowell and William Bradford Reynolds, who served as Assistant Attorney General for the Civil Rights Division from 1981 to 1988, called for "strictly color-blind policies". Sowell and Reynolds, like many conservatives at that time, believed that the goal of equality of the races had already been achieved, and therefore the race-specific civil rights movement was a "threat to democracy". The color-blindness logic used in "reverse discrimination" arguments in the post-civil rights period is informed by a particular viewpoint on "equality of opportunity", as adopted by Sowell, in which the state's role is limited to providing a "level playing field" rather than promoting an equal distribution of resources.

Crenshaw claimed that "equality of opportunity" in antidiscrimination law can have both an expansive and a restrictive aspect. Crenshaw wrote that formally color-blind laws continue to have racially discriminatory outcomes. According to her, this use of formal color-blindness rhetoric in claims of reverse discrimination, as in the 1978 Supreme Court ruling on Bakke, was a response to the way in which the courts had aggressively imposed affirmative action and busing during the Civil Rights era, even on those who were hostile to those issues. In 1990, legal scholar Duncan Kennedy described the dominant approach to affirmative action in legal academia as "colorblind meritocratic fundamentalism". He called for a postmodern "race consciousness" approach that included "political and cultural relations" while avoiding "racialism" and "essentialism".

Sociologist Eduardo Bonilla-Silva describes this newer, subtle form of racism as "color-blind racism", which uses frameworks of abstract liberalism to decontextualize race, naturalize outcomes such as segregation in neighborhoods, attribute certain cultural practices to race, and cause "minimization of racism".

In his influential 1984 article, Delgado challenged the liberal concept of meritocracy in civil rights scholarship. He questioned how the top articles in most well-established journals were all written by white men.

=== Storytelling/counterstorytelling and "naming one's own reality" ===
This refers to the use of narrative (storytelling) to illuminate and explore lived experiences of racial oppression.

One of the prime tenets of liberal jurisprudence is that people can create appealing narratives to think and talk about greater levels of justice. Delgado and Stefancic call this the empathic fallacy—the belief that it is possible to "control our consciousness" by using language alone to overcome bigotry and narrow-mindedness. They examine how people of color, considered outsiders in mainstream US culture, are portrayed in media and law through stereotypes and stock characters that have been adapted over time to shield the dominant culture from discomfort and guilt. For example, slaves in the 18th-century Southern States were depicted as childlike and docile; Harriet Beecher Stowe adapted this stereotype through her character Uncle Tom, depicting him as a "gentle, long-suffering", pious Christian.

Following the American Civil War, the African-American woman was depicted as a wise, care-giving "Mammy" figure. During the Reconstruction period, African-American men were stereotyped as "brutish and bestial", a danger to white women and children. This was exemplified in Thomas Dixon Jr.'s novels, used as the basis for the epic film The Birth of a Nation, which celebrated the Ku Klux Klan and lynching. During the Harlem Renaissance, African-Americans were depicted as "musically talented" and "entertaining". Following World War II, when many Black veterans joined the nascent civil rights movement, African Americans were portrayed as "cocky [and] street-smart", the "unreasonable, opportunistic" militant, the "safe, comforting, cardigan-wearing" TV sitcom character, and the "super-stud" of blaxploitation films.

The empathic fallacy informs the "time-warp aspect of racism", where the dominant culture can see racism only through the hindsight of a past era or distant land, such as South Africa. Through centuries of stereotypes, racism has become normalized; it is a "part of the dominant narrative we use to interpret experience". Delgado and Stefancic argue that speech alone is an ineffective tool to counter racism, since the system of free expression tends to favor the interests of powerful elites and to assign responsibility for racist stereotypes to the "marketplace of ideas". In the decades following the passage of civil rights laws, acts of racism had become less overt and more covert—invisible to, and underestimated by, most of the dominant culture.

Since racism makes people feel uncomfortable, the empathic fallacy helps the dominant culture to mistakenly believe that it no longer exists, and that dominant images, portrayals, stock characters, and stereotypes—which usually portray minorities in a negative light—provide them with a true image of race in America. Based on these narratives, the dominant group has no need to feel guilty or to make an effort to overcome racism, as it feels "right, customary, and inoffensive to those engaged in it", while self-described liberals who uphold freedom of expression can feel virtuous while maintaining their own superior position.

=== Standpoint epistemology ===
This is the view that members of racial minority groups have a unique authority and ability to speak about racism. This is seen as undermining dominant narratives relating to racial inequality, such as legal neutrality and personal responsibility or bootstrapping, through valuable first-hand accounts of the experience of racism.

=== Revisionist interpretations of American civil rights law and progress ===
Interest convergence is a concept introduced by Derrick Bell in his 1980 Harvard Law Review article, "Brown v. Board of Education and the Interest-Convergence Dilemma". In this article, Bell described how he re-assessed the impact of the hundreds of NAACP Legal Defense and Educational Fund (LDF) de-segregation cases he won from 1960 to 1966 and how he began to believe that in spite of his sincerity at the time, anti-discrimination law had not resulted in improving Black children's access to quality education. He listed and described how Supreme Court cases had gutted civil rights legislation, which had resulted in African-American students continuing to attend all-black schools that lacked adequate funding and resources. In examining these Supreme Court cases, Bell concluded that the only civil-rights legislation that was passed coincided with the self-interest of white people, which Bell termed interest convergence.

One of the best-known examples of interest convergence is the way in which American geopolitics during the Cold War in the aftermath of World War II was a critical factor in the passage of civil rights legislation by both Republicans and Democrats. Bell described this in numerous articles, including the aforementioned, and it was supported by the research and publications of legal scholar Mary L. Dudziak. In her journal articles and her 2000 book Cold War Civil Rights—based on newly released documents—Dudziak provided detailed evidence that it was in the interest of the United States to quell the negative international press about treatment of African-Americans when the majority of the populations of newly decolonized countries which the US was trying to attract to Western-style democracy, were not white. The US sought to promote liberal values throughout Africa, Asia, and Latin America to prevent the Soviet Union from spreading communism. Dudziak described how the international press widely circulated stories of segregation and violence against African-Americans.

The Moore's Ford lynchings, where a World War II veteran was lynched, were particularly widespread in the news. American allies followed stories of American racism through the international press, and the Soviets used stories of racism against Black Americans as a vital part of their propaganda. Dudziak performed extensive archival research in the US Department of State and Department of Justice and concluded that US government support for civil-rights legislation "was motivated in part by the concern that racial discrimination harmed the United States' foreign relations". When the National Guard was called in to prevent nine African-American students from integrating the Little Rock Central High School, the international press covered the story extensively. The then-Secretary of State told President Dwight Eisenhower that the Little Rock situation was "ruining" American foreign policy, particularly in Asia and Africa. The US's ambassador to the United Nations told President Eisenhower that as two-thirds of the world's population was not white, he was witnessing their negative reactions to American racial discrimination. He suspected that the US "lost several votes on the Chinese communist item because of Little Rock."

=== Intersectional theory ===
This refers to the examination of race, sex, class, national origin, and sexual orientation, and how their intersections play out in various settings, such as how the needs of a Latina are different from those of a Black male, and whose needs are promoted. For example, a Latina woman may encounter language barriers and sex-based challenges in the work field, not typically faced by a Black male, whereas a Black male may be more likely to experience racial profiling. Policies addressing discrimination might be geared towards race-based discrimination in general, undermining the needs of both parties. These intersections provide a more holistic picture for evaluating different groups of people. Intersectionality is a response to identity politics insofar as identity politics does not take into account the different intersections of people's identities.

=== Essentialism vs. anti-essentialism ===
Delgado and Stefancic write, "Scholars who write about these issues are concerned with the appropriate unit for analysis: Is the black community one, or many, communities? Do middle- and working-class African-Americans have different interests and needs? Do all oppressed peoples have something in common?" This is a look at the ways that oppressed groups may share in their oppression but also have different needs and values that need to be analyzed differently. It is a question of how groups can be essentialized or are unable to be essentialized.

From an essentialist perspective, one's identity consists of an internal "essence" that is static and unchanging from birth, whereas a non-essentialist position holds that "the subject has no fixed or permanent identity." Racial essentialism diverges into biological and cultural essentialism, where subordinated groups may endorse one over the other. "Cultural and biological forms of racial essentialism share the idea that differences between racial groups are determined by a fixed and uniform essence that resides within and defines all members of each racial group. However, they differ in their understanding of the nature of this essence." Subordinated communities may be more likely to endorse cultural essentialism as it provides a basis of positive distinction for establishing a cumulative resistance as a means to assert their identities and advocacy of rights. By comparison, biological essentialism may be unlikely to resonate with marginalized groups because historically dominant groups have used genetics and biology in justifying both racism and oppression.

Essentialism is the idea of a singular, shared experience between a specific group of people. Anti-essentialism, on the other hand, believes that there are other various factors that can affect a person's being and overall life experience. The race of an individual is viewed more as a social construct that does not necessarily dictate the outcome of their life circumstances. Race is viewed as "a social and historical construction, rather than an inherent, fixed, essential biological characteristic." Anti-essentialism "forces a destabilization in the very concept of race itself…" The results of this destabilization vary on the analytic focus falling into two general categories, "... consequences for the analytic concepts of racial identity or racial subjectivity."

=== Structural determinism, and race, sex, class, and their intersections ===
This refers to the exploration of how "the structure of legal thought or culture influences its content" in a way that determines social outcomes. Delgado and Stefancic cited "empathic fallacy" as one example of structural determinism: the "idea that our system, by reason of its structure and vocabulary, cannot redress certain types of wrong." They interrogate the absence of terms such as intersectionality, anti-essentialism, and jury nullification in standard legal reference research tools in law libraries.

=== Cultural nationalism/separatism ===
This refers to the exploration of more radical views that argue for separation and reparations as a form of foreign aid (including black nationalism).

=== Legal institutions, critical pedagogy, and minorities in the bar ===
Camara Phyllis Jones defines institutionalized racism as "differential access to the goods, services, and opportunities of society by race. Institutionalized racism is normative, sometimes legalized and often manifests as inherited disadvantage. It is structural, having been absorbed into our institutions of custom, practice, and law, so there need not be an identifiable offender. Indeed, institutionalized racism is often evident as inaction in the face of need, manifesting itself both in material conditions and in access to power. With regard to the former, examples include differential access to quality education, sound housing, gainful employment, appropriate medical facilities, and a clean environment."

=== Black–white binary ===
The black–white binary is a paradigm identified by legal scholars through which racial issues and histories are typically articulated within a racial binary between black and white Americans. The binary largely governs how race has been portrayed and addressed throughout US history. Critical race theorists Richard Delgado and Jean Stefancic argue that anti-discrimination law has blindspots for non-black minorities due to its language being confined within the black–white binary.

== Applications and adaptations ==
Scholars of critical race theory have focused, with some particularity, on the issues of hate crime and hate speech. In response to the opinion of the US Supreme Court in the hate speech case of R.A.V. v. City of St. Paul (1992), in which the Court struck down an anti-bias ordinance as applied to a teenager who had burned a cross, Mari Matsuda and Charles Lawrence argued that the Court had paid insufficient attention to the history of racist speech and the actual injury produced by such speech.

Critical race theorists have also argued in favor of affirmative action. They propose that so-called merit standards for hiring and educational admissions are not race-neutral and that such standards are part of the rhetoric of neutrality through which whites justify their disproportionate share of resources and social benefits.

In his 2009 article "Will the Real CRT Please Stand Up: The Dangers of Philosophical Contributions to CRT", Curry distinguished between the original CRT key writings and what is being done in the name of CRT by a "growing number of white feminists". The new CRT movement "favors narratives that inculcate the ideals of a post-racial humanity and racial amelioration between compassionate (Black and White) philosophical thinkers dedicated to solving America's race problem." They are interested in discourse (i.e., how individuals speak about race) and the theories of white Continental philosophers, over and against the structural and institutional accounts of white supremacy which were at the heart of the realist analysis of racism introduced in Derrick Bell's early works, and articulated through such African-American thinkers as W. E. B. Du Bois, Paul Robeson, and Judge Robert L. Carter.

== History ==
=== Early years ===
Although the terminology critical race theory began in its application to laws, the subject emerges from the broader frame of critical theory in how it analyzes power structures in society despite whatever laws may be in effect. In the 1998 article, "Critical Race Theory: Past, Present, and Future", Delgado and Stefancic trace the origins of CRT to the early writings of Derrick Albert Bell Jr. including his 1976 Yale Law Journal article, "Serving Two Masters" and his 1980 Harvard Law Review article entitled "Brown v. Board of Education and the Interest-Convergence Dilemma".

In the 1970s, as a professor at Harvard Law School Bell began to critique, question and re-assess the civil rights cases he had litigated in the 1960s to desegregate schools following the passage of Brown v. Board of Education. This re-assessment became the "cornerstone of critical race theory". Delgado and Stefancic, who together wrote Critical Race Theory: an Introduction in 2001, described Bell's "interest convergence" as a "means of understanding Western racial history". The focus on desegregation after the 1954 Supreme Court decision in Brown—declaring school segregation unconstitutional—left "civil-rights lawyers compromised between their clients' interests and the law". The concern of many Black parents—for their children's access to better education—was being eclipsed by the interests of litigators who wanted a "breakthrough" in their "pursuit of racial balance in schools". In 1995, Cornel West said that Bell was "virtually the lone dissenter" writing in leading law reviews who challenged basic assumptions about how the law treated people of color.

In his Harvard Law Review articles, Bell cites the 1964 Hudson v. Leake County School Board case which the NAACP Legal Defense and Educational Fund (LDF) won, mandating that the all-white school board comply with desegregation. At that time it was seen as a success. By the 1970s, white parents were removing their children from the desegregated schools and enrolling them in segregation academies. Bell came to believe that he had been mistaken in 1964 when, as a young lawyer working for the LDF, he had convinced Winson Hudson, who was the head of the newly formed local NAACP chapter in Harmony, Mississippi, to fight the all-White Leake County School Board to desegregate schools. She and the other Black parents had initially sought LDF assistance to fight the board's closure of their school—one of the historic Rosenwald Schools for Black children. Bell explained to Hudson, that—following Brown—the LDF could not fight to keep a segregated Black school open; they would have to fight for desegregation. In 1964, Bell and the NAACP had believed that resources for desegregated schools would be increased and Black children would access higher quality education, since White parents would insist on better quality schools.

Bell began to work for the LDF shortly after the Montgomery bus boycott and the ensuing 1956 Supreme Court ruling following Browder v. Gayle that the Alabama and Montgomery bus segregation laws were unconstitutional. From 1960 to 1966 Bell successfully litigated 300 civil rights cases in Mississippi. Bell was inspired by Thurgood Marshall, who had been one of the two leaders of a decades-long legal campaign starting in the 1930s, in which they filed hundreds of lawsuits to reverse the "separate but equal" doctrine announced by the Supreme Court's decision in Plessy v. Ferguson (1896). The Court ruled that racial segregation laws enacted by the states were not in violation of the United States Constitution as long as the facilities for each race were equal in quality. The Plessy decision provided the legal mandate at the federal level to enforce Jim Crow laws that had been introduced by white Southern Democrats starting in the 1870s for racial segregation in all public facilities, including public schools. The Court's 1954 Brown decision—which held that the "separate but equal" doctrine is unconstitutional in the context of public schools and educational facilities—severely weakened Plessy. The Supreme Court concept of constitutional colorblindness in regards to case evaluation began with Plessy. Before Plessy, the Court considered color as a determining factor in many landmark cases, which reinforced Jim Crow laws. Bell's 1960s civil rights work built on Justice Marshall's groundwork begun in the 1930s. It was a time when the legal branch of the civil rights movement was launching thousands of civil rights cases. It was a period of idealism for the civil rights movement.

At Harvard, Bell developed new courses that studied American law through a racial lens. He compiled his own course materials which were published in 1970 under the title Race, Racism, and American Law. He became Harvard Law School's first Black tenured professor in 1971.

During the 1970s, the courts were using legislation to enforce affirmative action programs and busing—where the courts mandated busing to achieve racial integration in school districts that rejected desegregation. In response, the 1970s neoconservative think tanks—hostile to these two issues in particular—developed a color-blind rhetoric to oppose them, claiming they represented reverse discrimination. In 1978, Regents of the University of California v. Bakke, when Bakke won this landmark Supreme Court case by using the argument of reverse racism, Bell's skepticism that racism would end increased. Justice Lewis F. Powell Jr. held that the "guarantee of equal protection cannot mean one thing when applied to one individual and something else when applied to a person of another color." In a 1979 article, Bell asked if there were any groups of the White population that would be willing to suffer any disadvantage that might result from the implementation of a policy to rectify harms to Black people resulting from slavery, segregation, or discrimination.

Bell resigned in 1980 because of what he viewed as the university's discriminatory practices, became the dean at University of Oregon School of Law and later returned to Harvard as a visiting professor.

While he was absent from Harvard, his supporters organized protests against Harvard's lack of racial diversity in the curriculum, in the student body, and in the faculty. The university had rejected student requests, saying no sufficiently qualified black instructor existed. Legal scholar Randall Kennedy writes that some students had "felt affronted" by Harvard's choice to employ an "archetypal white liberal... in a way that precludes the development of black leadership".

One of these students was Kimberlé Crenshaw, who had chosen Harvard in order to study under Bell; she was introduced to his work at Cornell. Crenshaw organized the student-led initiative to offer an alternative course on race and law in 1981—based on Bell's course and textbook—where students brought in visiting professors, such as Charles Lawrence, Linda Greene, Neil Gotanda, and Richard Delgado, to teach chapter-by-chapter from Race, Racism, and American Law.

Critical race theory emerged as an intellectual movement with the organization of this boycott; CRT scholars included graduate law students and professors.

Alan Freeman was a founding member of the Critical Legal Studies (CLS) movement that hosted forums in the 1980s. CLS legal scholars challenged claims to the alleged value-neutral position of the law. They criticized the legal system's role in generating and legitimizing oppressive social structures which contributed to maintaining an unjust and oppressive class system. Delgado and Stefancic cite the work of Alan Freeman in the 1970s as formative to critical race theory. In his 1978 Minnesota Law Review article Freeman reinterpreted, through a critical legal studies perspective, how the Supreme Court oversaw civil rights legislation from 1953 to 1969 under the Warren Court. He criticized the narrow interpretation of the law which denied relief for victims of racial discrimination. In his article, Freeman describes two perspectives on the concept of racial discrimination: that of victim or perpetrator. Racial discrimination to the victim includes both objective conditions and the "consciousness associated with those objective conditions". To the perpetrator, racial discrimination consists only of actions without consideration of the objective conditions experienced by the victims, such as the "lack of jobs, lack of money, lack of housing". Only those individuals who could prove they were victims of discrimination were deserving of remedies. By the late 1980s, Freeman, Bell, and other CRT scholars left the CLS movement claiming it was too narrowly focused on class and economic structures while neglecting the role of race and race relations in American law.

=== Emergence as a movement ===
In 1989, Kimberlé Crenshaw, Neil Gotanda, and Stephanie Phillips organized a workshop at the St. Benedict Center in Madison, Wisconsin entitled "New Developments in Critical Race Theory". The organizers coined the term "Critical Race Theory" to signify an "intersection of critical theory and race, racism and the law." Delgado later reflected that the convent, with its austere rooms and crucifixes, was "an odd place for a bunch of Marxists."

Afterward, legal scholars began publishing a higher volume of works employing critical race theory, including more than "300 leading law review articles" and books. In 1990, Duncan Kennedy published his article on affirmative action in legal academia in the Duke Law Journal, and Anthony E. Cook published his article "Beyond Critical Legal Studies" in the Harvard Law Review. In 1991, Patricia Williams published The Alchemy of Race and Rights, while Derrick Bell published Faces at the Bottom of the Well in 1992. Cheryl I. Harris published her 1993 Harvard Law Review article "Whiteness as Property" in which she described how passing led to benefits akin to owning property. In 1995, two dozen legal scholars contributed to a major compilation of key writings on CRT.

By the early 1990s, key concepts and features of CRT had emerged. Bell had introduced his concept of "interest convergence" in his 1973 article. He developed the concept of racial realism in a 1992 series of essays and book, Faces at the bottom of the well: the permanence of racism. He said that Black people needed to accept that the civil rights era legislation would not on its own bring about progress in race relations; anti-Black racism in the US was a "permanent fixture" of American society; and equality was "impossible and illusory" in the US. Crenshaw introduced the term intersectionality in the 1990s.

In 1995, pedagogical theorists Gloria Ladson-Billings and William F. Tate began applying the critical race theory framework in the field of education. In their 1995 article Ladson-Billings and Tate described the role of the social construction of white norms and interests in education. They sought to better understand inequities in schooling. Scholars have since expanded work to explore issues including school segregation in the US; relations between race, gender, and academic achievement; pedagogy; and research methodologies.

As of 2002, over 20 American law schools and at least three non-American law schools offered critical race theory courses or classes. Critical race theory is also applied in the fields of education, political science, women's studies, ethnic studies, communication, sociology, and American studies. Other movements developed that apply critical race theory to specific groups. These include the Latino-critical (LatCrit), queer-critical, and Asian-critical movements. These continued to engage with the main body of critical theory research, over time developing independent priorities and research methods.

CRT has also been taught internationally, including in the United Kingdom (UK) and Australia. According to educational researcher Mike Cole, the main proponents of CRT in the UK include David Gillborn, John Preston, and Namita Chakrabarty.

=== Philosophical foundations ===
CRT scholars draw on the work of Antonio Gramsci, Sojourner Truth, Frederick Douglass, and W. E. B. DuBois. Bell shared Paul Robeson's belief that "Black self-reliance and African cultural continuity should form the epistemic basis of Blacks' worldview." Their writing is also informed by the 1960s and 1970s movements such as Black Power, Chicano, and radical feminism. Critical race theory shares many intellectual commitments with critical theory, critical legal studies, feminist jurisprudence, and postcolonial theory. University of Connecticut philosopher, Lewis Gordon, who has focused on postcolonial phenomenology, and race and racism, wrote that CRT is notable for its use of postmodern poststructural scholarship, including an emphasis on "subaltern" or "marginalized" communities and the "use of alternative methodology in the expression of theoretical work, most notably their use of 'narratives' and other literary techniques".

Standpoint theory, which has been adopted by some CRT scholars, emerged from the first wave of the women's movement in the 1970s. The main focus of feminist standpoint theory is epistemology—the study of how knowledge is produced. The term was coined by Sandra Harding, an American feminist theorist, and developed by Dorothy Smith in her 1989 publication, The Everyday World as Problematic: A Feminist Sociology. Smith wrote that by studying how women socially construct their own everyday life experiences, sociologists could ask new questions. Patricia Hill Collins introduced black feminist standpoint—a collective wisdom of those who have similar perspectives in society which sought to heighten awareness to these marginalized groups and provide ways to improve their position in society.

Critical race theory draws on the priorities and perspectives of both critical legal studies (CLS) and conventional civil rights scholarship, while also sharply contesting both of these fields. UC Davis School of Law legal scholar Angela P. Harris, describes critical race theory as sharing "a commitment to a vision of liberation from racism through right reason" with the civil rights tradition. It deconstructs some premises and arguments of legal theory and simultaneously holds that legally constructed rights are incredibly important. CRT scholars disagreed with the CLS anti-legal rights stance, nor did they wish to "abandon the notions of law" completely; CRT legal scholars acknowledged that some legislation and reforms had helped people of color. As described by Derrick Bell, critical race theory in Harris' view is committed to "radical critique of the law (which is normatively deconstructionist) and... radical emancipation by the law (which is normatively reconstructionist)".

University of Edinburgh philosophy professor Tommy J. Curry says that by 2009, the CRT perspective on a race as a social construct was accepted by "many race scholars" as a "commonsense view" that race is not "biologically grounded and natural". "Social construct" is a term from social constructivism, whose roots can be traced to the early science wars, instigated in part by Thomas Kuhn's 1962 The Structure of Scientific Revolutions. Ian Hacking, a Canadian philosopher specializing in the philosophy of science, describes how social construction has spread through the social sciences. He cites the social construction of race as an example, asking how race could be "constructed" better.

== Criticism ==
=== Academic criticism ===
According to the Encyclopaedia Britannica, aspects of CRT have been criticized by "legal scholars and jurists from across the political spectrum". Criticism of CRT has focused on its emphasis on storytelling, its critique of the merit principle and of objective truth, and its thesis of the voice of color. As reported by Britannica, critics say it contains a "postmodernist-inspired skepticism of objectivity and truth" and has a tendency to interpret "any racial inequity or imbalance ... as proof of institutional racism and as grounds for directly imposing racially equitable outcomes in those realms". Proponents of CRT have also been accused of treating even well-meaning criticism of CRT as evidence of latent racism.

In a 1997 book, law professors Daniel A. Farber and Suzanna Sherry criticized CRT for basing its claims on personal narrative and for its lack of testable hypotheses and measurable data. CRT scholars including Crenshaw, Delgado, and Stefancic responded that such critiques represent dominant modes within social science which tend to exclude people of color. Delgado and Stefancic wrote: "In these realms [social science and politics], truth is a social construct created to suit the purposes of the dominant group." Farber and Sherry have also argued that anti-meritocratic tenets in critical race theory, critical feminism, and critical legal studies may unintentionally lead to antisemitic and anti-Asian implications. They write that the success of Jews and Asians within what critical race theorists posit to be a structurally unfair system may lend itself to allegations of cheating and advantage-taking. In response, Delgado and Stefancic write that there is a difference between criticizing an unfair system and criticizing individuals who perform well inside that system.

Philosopher John Gray writes that CRT "projects a particular American history onto all of humankind".

=== Public controversies ===
Critical race theory has stirred controversy in the United States for promoting the use of narrative in legal studies, advocating "legal instrumentalism" as opposed to ideal-driven uses of the law, and encouraging legal scholars to promote racial equity.

Before 1993, the term "critical race theory" was not part of public discourse. In the spring of that year, conservatives launched a campaign led by Clint Bolick to portray Lani Guinier—then-President Bill Clinton's nominee for Assistant Attorney General for Civil Rights—as a radical because of her connection to CRT. Within months, Clinton withdrew the nomination, describing the effort to stop Guinier's appointment as "a campaign of right-wing distortion and vilification". This was part of a wider conservative strategy to shift the Supreme Court in their favor.

Amy E. Ansell writes that the logic of legal instrumentalism reached wide public reception in the O.J. Simpson murder case when attorney Johnnie Cochran "enacted a sort of applied CRT", selecting an African-American jury and urging them to acquit Simpson in spite of the evidence against him—a form of jury nullification. Legal scholar Jeffrey Rosen calls this the "most striking example" of CRT's influence on the US legal system. Law professor Margaret M. Russell responded to Rosen's assertion in the Michigan Law Review, saying that Cochran's "dramatic" and "controversial" courtroom "style and strategic sense" in the Simpson case resulted from his decades of experience as an attorney; it was not significantly influenced by CRT writings.

In 2010, a Mexican-American studies program in Tucson, Arizona, was halted because of a state law forbidding public schools from offering race-conscious education in the form of "advocat[ing] ethnic solidarity instead of the treatment of pupils as individuals". Certain books, including a primer on CRT, were banned from the curriculum. Matt de la Peña's young-adult novel Mexican WhiteBoy was banned for "containing 'critical race theory'" according to state officials. The ban on ethnic-studies programs was later deemed unconstitutional on the grounds that the state showed discriminatory intent: "Both enactment and enforcement were motivated by racial animus", federal Judge A. Wallace Tashima ruled.

==== 2020s challenges ====
State laws restricting race education in the United States as of July 2022: States with laws restricting education on race in classrooms or state agencies States considering bills or policies that would restrict race education in schools or state agencies States that failed to pass this type of legislation States that have not introduced legislation on this topic

Since 2020, efforts have been made by people, most notably American conservatives, to challenge critical race theory (CRT) in schools in the United States. Following the 2020 protests of the murders of Ahmaud Arbery and George Floyd and the killing of Breonna Taylor, school districts began to introduce additional curricula and create diversity, equity, and inclusion (DEI)-positions to address "disparities stemming from race, economics, disabilities and other factors". These measures were met with criticism from conservatives, particularly those in the Republican Party. Political scientist Jennifer Victor of George Mason University has described this as part of a cycle of backlash against progress toward racial equality and equity. While University of Buckingham professor Eric Kauffman suggests parents are reacting to examples they're seeing in the classroom with him saying "the more voters learn about what CRT means in practice, the less they like it".

Outspoken critics of critical race theory include U.S. president Donald Trump, conservative activist Christopher Rufo, various Republican officials, and conservative commentators on Fox News and right-wing talk radio shows. Movements have arisen from the controversy; in particular, the No Left Turn in Education movement, which has been described as one of the largest groups targeting school boards regarding critical race theory. In response to the assertion that CRT was being taught in public schools, dozens of states have introduced bills that limit what schools can teach regarding race, American history, politics, and gender. A study published by Indiana University in 2024 on the censorship of critical perspectives in American schools found that "in 16 Republican-dominated states, policies have been enacted to restrict the teaching of critical perspectives on race, sexuality, and other controversial subjects and to perpetuate a positive view of U.S. history". A study published by Purchase College states that critical race theory is facing a "swift annihilation" after the 2020 controversy, which is cause for it to be studied and understood better. Following the censorship by many states and school boards, Holovka highlights the idea that censoring teachers in this way has the potential to limit critical thinking in students due to their limited ability to discuss controversial topics.

== Subfields ==
Within critical race theory, various sub-groupings focus on issues and nuances unique to particular ethno-racial and/or marginalized communities. This includes the intersection of race with disability, ethnicity, gender, sexuality, class, or religion. For example, disability critical race studies (DisCrit), critical race feminism (CRF), Jewish critical race theory (HebCrit, pronounced "Heeb"), Black critical race theory (Black Crit), Latino critical race studies (LatCrit), Asian American critical race studies (AsianCrit), South Asian American critical race studies (DesiCrit), quantitative critical race theory (QuantCrit), queer critical race theory (QueerCrit), and American Indian critical race studies or Tribal critical race theory (sometimes called TribalCrit). CRT methodologies have also been applied to the study of white immigrant groups. CRT has spurred some scholars to call for a second wave of whiteness studies, which is now a small offshoot known as Second Wave Whiteness (SWW). Critical race theory has also begun to spawn research that looks at understandings of race outside the United States.

=== Disability critical race studies ===
Another offshoot field is disability critical race studies (DisCrit), which combines disability studies and CRT to focus on the intersection of disability and race.

=== Latino critical race theory ===
Latino critical race theory (LatCRT or LatCrit) is a research framework that outlines the social construction of race as central to how people of color are constrained and oppressed in society. Race scholars developed LatCRT as a critical response to the "problem of the color line" first explained by W. E. B. Du Bois. While CRT focuses on the Black–White paradigm, LatCRT has moved to consider other racial groups, mainly Chicana/Chicanos, as well as Latinos/as, Asians, Native Americans/First Nations, and women of color.

In Critical Race Counterstories along the Chicana/Chicano Educational Pipeline, Tara J. Yosso discusses how the constraint of POC can be defined. Looking at the differences between Chicana/o students, the tenets that separate such individuals are: the intercentricity of race and racism, the challenge of dominant ideology, the commitment to social justice, the centrality of experience knowledge, and the interdisciplinary perspective.

LatCRTs main focus is to advocate social justice for those living in marginalized communities (specifically Chicana/os), who are guided by structural arrangements that disadvantage people of color. Arrangements where Social institutions function as dispossessions, disenfranchisement, and discrimination over minority groups. In an attempt to give voice to those who are victimized, LatCRT has created two common themes:

First, CRT proposes that white supremacy and racial power are maintained over time, a process that the law plays a central role in. Different racial groups lack the voice to speak in this civil society, and, as such, CRT has introduced a new critical form of expression, called the voice of color. The voice of color is narratives and storytelling monologues used as devices for conveying personal racial experiences. These are also used to counter metanarratives that continue to maintain racial inequality. Therefore, the experiences of the oppressed are important aspects for developing a LatCRT analytical approach, and it has not been since the rise of slavery that an institution has so fundamentally shaped the life opportunities of those who bear the label of criminal.

Secondly, LatCRT work has investigated the possibility of transforming the relationship between law enforcement and racial power, as well as pursuing a project of achieving racial emancipation and anti-subordination more broadly. Its body of research is distinct from general critical race theory in that it emphasizes immigration theory and policy, language rights, and accent- and national origin-based forms of discrimination. CRT finds the experiential knowledge of people of color and draws explicitly from these lived experiences as data, presenting research findings through storytelling, chronicles, scenarios, narratives, and parables.

=== Asian critical race theory ===
Asian critical race theory (Asian CRT or AsianCrit) looks at the influence of race and racism on Asian-descended communities across social contexts such as education, employment, and social integration. While Asian CRT developed within U.S. scholarship to address the experiences of Asian Americans, it also attends to diasporic and transnational contexts and the internal diversity of Asian-racialized communities.

Distinct from some mainstream emphases within CRT, Asian CRT highlights intersections of immigration and settlement policy, intra-community dynamics, and racialized stereotypes such as the "model minority" and the "perpetual foreigner". Scholars argue that these processes contribute to both structural inequalities and internalized forms of racialization. This suggests that Asian CRT can inform anti-racist practices and policy responses relevant to Asian communities and their allies.

Nowadays, Asian racialized groups are still facing discrimination and targeted hostility. Five years after the COVID-19 pandemic began, Asian Americans and Pacific Islanders still experience race-based hate and xenophobia. Reports have documented hundreds of incidents each year and have noted ongoing concerns about anti-immigrant narratives and policy climates.

=== Tribal critical race theory ===
Critical race theory evolved in the 1970s in response to Critical Legal Studies. Tribal Critical Theory (TribalCrit) focuses on stories and values oral data as a primary source of information. TribalCrit builds on the idea that White supremacy and imperialism underpin US policies toward Indigenous peoples. In contrast with CRT, it argues that colonization rather than racism is endemic to society. A key tenet of TribalCrit is that Indigenous people exist within a US society that both politicizes and racializes them, placing them in a "liminal space" where Indigenous self-representation is at odds with how others perceive them. TribalCrit argues that ideas of culture, information, and power take on new importance when inspected through a Native lens. TribalCrit rejects goals of assimilation in US educational institutions, and argues that understanding the lived realities of Indigenous peoples is dependent on comprehending tribal philosophies, beliefs, traditions, and visions for the future.

=== Critical philosophy of race ===
The critical philosophy of race is inspired by both critical legal studies and critical race theory's use of interdisciplinary scholarship. Both CLS and CRT explore the covert nature of mainstream use of "apparently neutral concepts, such as merit or freedom".

== See also ==
- Anti-bias curriculum
- Cultural Marxism conspiracy theory
- Cultural hegemony
- Judicial aspects of race in the United States
- Racism in the United States
- Slavery in the United States
- White privilege
- Culture war
- Identity politics
- Whiteness studies
