= Kgositsile =

Kgositsile is a surname. Notable people with the surname include:

- Baleka Mbete-Kgositsile (born 1949), South African politician
- Keorapetse Kgositsile (1938–2018), South African poet and political activist
- Melba Johnson Kgositsile (1940–1994), American civil rights activist
- Thebe Neruda Kgositsile (born 1994), American rapper and record producer
