= Phillippa Yaa de Villiers =

South African writer and performance artist (born 1966)

- Born: 17 February 1966 (age 60); Hillbrow, Johannesburg, South Africa
- Education: Rhodes University; University of the Witwatersrand; Lecoq International School of Theatre; Lancaster University
- Occupations: Poet, performance artist
- Notable work: The Everyday Wife (2010)

Phillippa Yaa de Villiers (born 17 February 1966) is a South African writer and performance artist who performs her work nationally and internationally.

She is noted for her poetry, which has been published in collections and in many magazines and anthologies, as well as for her autobiographical one-woman show, Original Skin, which centres on her confusion about her identity at a young age, as the biracial daughter of an Australian mother and a Ghanaian father who was adopted and raised by a white family in apartheid South Africa. She has written: "I became Phillippa Yaa when I found my biological father, who told me that if he had been there when I was born, the first name I'd have been given would be a day name like all Ghanaian babies, and all Thursday girls are Yaa, Yawo, or Yaya. So by changing my name I intended to inscribe a feeling of belonging and also one of pride on my African side. After growing up black in white South Africa, internalising so many negative 'truths' of what black people are like, I needed to reclaim my humanity and myself from the toxic dance of objectification." She has also said: "Because I wasn't told that I was adopted until I was twenty, I lacked a vocabulary to describe who I am and where I come from, so performing and writing became ways to make myself up."

Tishani Doshi observes in the New Indian Express about De Villiers: "Much of her work is concerned with race, sexuality, class and gender within the South African context."

== Biography ==
=== Adoption and childhood years ===
De Villiers was born at Hillbrow in Johannesburg, South Africa, where she spent the first months of her life in The Princess Alice Home, a facility for adopted babies. Half-Australian and half-Ghanaian, she was adopted at nine months of age, although not told of it by her white adoptive parents until she was 20 years old. She has written about the impact of these experiences:

"I started writing poetry when I was a child, my first published poem was when I was 11. I was brought up in a home that loved poetry and literature, especially the English language. But it was only when I was older that I realised that writing is so much more than words playing on a page. Writing contains the writer, their concerns, their social context and their history. My own history became a block to my creativity as I started to explore my identity as a black woman adopted by a white family in apartheid South Africa. I felt like the colonised and the coloniser were fighting each other inside my brain. Writing continued to be important to me but I was convinced that it was simply a therapeutic process, of no value to anyone else.

Although their relationship was tempestuous and marked by long separations, de Villiers credits her adoptive mother Hertha Lilly Amalia nee Graf, an eminent physical anthropologist, with the love of poetry as well as believing in her talent as a performer. The story of their relationship, and a broader exposition of Yaa's complex racial identity, appears in Darwin's Hunch, Christa Kuljian's expansive exploration of race and science.

As a mixed-race African and adoptee I feel, paradoxically, oppressed and completely free....My adult life has been largely devoted to healing this rift. The freedom of my paradoxical position, is in fact that I don't have the constraints of a traditional role and I have access to the world."

=== Further education and early career ===
She studied for a journalism degree at Rhodes University, Grahamstown, and also obtained an Honours degree in Dramatic Art and Scriptwriting from the University of the Witwatersrand. She is a graduate of the Lecoq International School of Theatre in Paris, France, where she studied mime and theatre. She then spent some time living in Los Angeles before returning to South Africa in 1998 to settle in Johannesburg. She worked as an actor for two years, performing in Theatre for Africa's award-winning productions of Kwamanzi, Horn of Sorrow and Elephant of Africa, "and then Bell's palsy sent her towards writing as an alternative career. She continued to participate in street theatre, performed regularly with Theatresports at the Market Theatre Laboratory for ten years and went to school to learn scriptwriting".

Over the next eight years she wrote television scripts, for shows including Backstage, Tsha Tsha, Thetha Msawawa, Takalani Sesame and Soul City among others, and she collaborated with Pule Hlatshwayo and Swedish writer Charlotte Lesche to create Score, a three-hour miniseries for Swedish Broadcasting and SABC. In 2005, de Villiers won a mentorship with English poet John Lindley through the British Council/Lancaster University's distance learning scheme "Crossing Borders". She wrote a two-hander play called Where the Children Live, which was runner-up for the best writer award and won the audience appreciation award at the national Pansa Festival of Contemporary Theatre Readings in 2005.

== Publication ==
In 2006, the Centre for the Book published her first volume of poetry, Taller Than Buildings, which was described as "an extraordinary debut collection of poetry, that is provocative and original, mirroring the transitions of self and country." Her second collection, The Everyday Wife, was launched at the Harare International Festival of the Arts in April 2010. According to Tolu Ogunlesi's review for Wasafiri magazine, "Yaa de Villiers' silence-smashing poems (in this manner reminiscent of Carol Ann Duffy's The World's Wife) are sensitive, unafraid to be erotic, sometimes tragic, and always irreverent". Her third collection, ice cream headache in my bone, appeared in September 2017, and in reviewing it Kelwyn Sole said: "The collection is dotted like gemstones with poems of delight at the world, even as she never loses sight of the post-industrial reality of degenerating modernity in which we live...".

Her poetry and prose are widely published in local and international journals and anthologies, including The Edinburgh Review, Poui, A Hudson View, Crossing Borders 3, We Are... (ed. Natalia Molebatsi; Penguin, 2008), Just Keep Breathing (eds Rosamund Haden and Sandra Dodson; Jacana, 2008), New Writing from Africa (ed. J. M. Coetzee; Johnson & King James, 2009), Home Away (ed. Louis Paul Greenberg; Zebra Press, 2010), Poems for Haiti (ed. Amitabh Mitra; Poets Printery 2010), Letter to South Africa (Umuzi, 2011), Let Me Tell You a Story (2016), and New Daughters of Africa (edited by Margaret Busby, 2019).

== Performance ==
De Villiers has toured her autobiographical one-woman show, Original Skin, in South Africa – including at the Market Theatre (Johannesburg) and the Grahamstown Festival) – and abroad, and has performed her work from Cuba to Cape Town, Berlin to Harare, as well as in her home town, Johannesburg.

She appeared at the Jozi Spoken Word Festival in 2006, and was invited by National Poet Laureate of South Africa Keorapetse Kgositsile to join James Matthews, Lebo Mashile and Khanyi Magubane representing South Africa at the 12th International Poetry Festival in Havana, Cuba.

In 2007, de Villiers appeared at the Word Power International Festival of Black Literature in London, England, and Poetry Africa, and in April 2008 at the "Together for Solidarity" conference in Sweden.

In 2009, she was writer-in-residence at Passa Porta's Villa Vollezele in Belgium. Also in 2009 she was part of the Beyond Words UK tour that also featured South African poets Keorapetse Kgositsile, Don Mattera, Lesego Rampolokeng and Lebo Mashile (presented by Apples and Snakes in association with Sustained Theatre, funded by the British Council South Africa, Arts Council England and the South African government).

In her capacity as 2014 Commonwealth Poet, she performed at Homerton College, Cambridge University, on 8 March 2014, together with fellow South African poet Isobel Dixon, as part of the Pedagogy, Language, Arts & Culture in Education (PLACE) Group Seminars series, co-hosted with the Centre for Commonwealth Education and funded by the Commonwealth Education Trust.

On 8 December 2014, de Villiers gave a performance in Leiden, Netherlands, at the ASC (African Studies Centre) Annual Public Event.

In April 2015, she read her work in Accra, Ghana, as a guest of the Writers Project of Ghana and the local Goethe Institute.

In 2017, she was invited to Namibia, where she read poetry and delivered a creative writing workshop at the Goethe Institut. At the Johannesburg Goethe Institut, she facilitated discussions and participated in panels with Tania Haberland and Xabiso Vili.

== Other literary work ==
In September 2016, she joined the editorial board of the African Poetry Book Fund (APBF), an organization that promotes and advances the development and publication of the poetic arts of Africa, alongside Kwame Dawes, Chris Abani, Gabeba Baderoon, Bernardine Evaristo, Aracelis Girmay, John Keene and Matthew Shenoda.

In 2017, de Viliers was commissioned to guest-edit a special edition of The Atlanta Review, focused on South African women poets, with contributors including Myesha Jenkins, Jolyn Phillips, Makhosazana Xaba, Ronelda Kamfer, Vangile Gantsho, Francine Simon, Karin Schimke, Lebogang Mashile and Arja Salafranca, among others.

In January 2023, the University of Nebraska Press published the volume Keorapetse Kgositsile: Collected Poems, 1969–2018, edited and with an introduction by de Villiers and Uhuru Portia Phalafal.

== Awards and honours ==
Among her many awards are the National Arts Festival/de Buren Writing Beyond the Fringe Prize 2009, and in 2011 a South African Literary Award for her poetry collection The Everyday Wife. She was the recipient of the 2012 Overseas Scholarship for studies in Creative Writing at Lancaster University, from where she graduated with an MA (with distinction) in 2014.

In 2014, she was chosen as Commonwealth poet, and was commissioned by the Commonwealth Education Trust to write a poem in celebration of Commonwealth Day. She performed her poem, entitled "Courage — it takes more", at Westminster Abbey on 10 March as part of the Commonwealth Celebrations, in the presence of Queen Elizabeth II and other members of the royal family, as well as senior politicians, high commissioners and Commonwealth dignitaries.

De Villiers teaches in the Creative Writing department at University of the Witwatersrand in Johannesburg, South Africa.

== Selected bibliography ==
- Taller Than Buildings (Cape Town: Centre for the Book, 2006, ISBN 978-0-620-37409-5)
- With Keorapetse Kgositsile, Don Mattera and Lebo Mashile, Beyond Words: South African Poetics; foreword by Margaret Busby (an Apples & Snakes project; flipped eye, 2009, ISBN 978-1905233304)
- The Everyday Wife; foreword by Margaret Busby (Cape Town: Modjaji Books, 2010, ISBN 978-1-920397-05-0)
- ice cream headache in my bone (Cape Town: Modjaji Books, 2017, ISBN 978-1-928215-32-5

=== As editor ===
- With Kaiyu Xiao and Isabelle Ferrin-Aguirre, No Serenity Here – an anthology of African Poetry (Beijing: New World Publishers, 2010, ISBN 978-7-5012-3895-8).

=== As contributor ===
- "Staying Safe", Konch Magazine, Special Issue, The Virus: Volume II, 2020.
- Marike Beyers (ed.), The Only Magic We Know: Selected Modjaji Poems 2004 to 2019, 2020.
- "Research That Is Real and Utopian: Indigenous Knowledge as a Resource to Revitalise High School Poetry" (with Louis Botha and Robert Maungedzo), Education As Change, 23 December 2020.
- "Love Song to Resistance", Evergreen Review, Spring/Summer 2024.
