= Keorapetse Kgositsile =

South African poet and political activist (1938–2018)

Keorapetse Kgositsile OIS
- Kgositsile in 2012
- Born: Keorapetse William Kgositsile; 19 September 1938; Johannesburg, South Africa
- Died: 3 January 2018 (aged 79); Johannesburg, South Africa
- Other name: Kgosi
- Education: University of New Hampshire; The New School for Social Research; Columbia University
- Occupations: Poet; journalist; political activist
- Years active: 1960–2018
- Spouses: Baleka Mbete (separated); Cheryl Harris (separated)
- Children: 5, including Thebe
- Writing career
- Pen name: Bra Willie
- Genre: Jazz
- Subjects: African culture; Black culture; African-American literature

Keorapetse William Kgositsile OIS (19 September 1938 – 3 January 2018), also known by his pen name Bra Willie, was a South African Tswana poet, journalist and political activist. An influential member of the African National Congress in the 1960s and 1970s, he was inaugurated as South Africa's National Poet Laureate in 2006. Kgositsile lived in exile in the United States from 1962 until 1975, the peak of his literary career. He made an extensive study of African-American literature and culture, becoming particularly interested in jazz. During the 1970s, he was a central figure among African-American poets, encouraging interest in Africa as well as the practice of poetry as a performance art; he was well known for his readings in New York City jazz clubs. Kgositsile was one of the first to bridge the gap between African poetry and African-American poetry in the United States. His son is American rapper Earl Sweatshirt.

== Early life ==
Keorapetse Kgositsile was born in a mostly white section of Johannesburg, and grew up in a small shack at the back of a house in a white neighbourhood that was rented by his mother. His first experience of apartheid, other than having to go to school outside of his neighbourhood for reasons he did not then understand, was a conflict with a local white family after he fought a white friend of his who hesitated when other friends refused to join a boxing club that denied Kgositsile membership. The experience was a formative one for him, and joined with other experiences of exclusion that increased throughout his teenage years. For Kgositsile, adulthood meant an entrance into apartheid.

Kgositsile attended Madibane High School in Johannesburg, as well as schools in other parts of the country. During that time, he was able (with some difficulty) to find books by Langston Hughes and Richard Wright, and was influenced by them as well as by European writers (principally Charles Dickens and D. H. Lawrence), he began writing stories, though not yet with any intention of doing so professionally. After working at a series of odd jobs after high school, he took to writing more seriously, getting a job with the politically charged newspaper New Age. He contributed both reporting and poetry to the newspaper. These early poems, anticipating a lifetime of Kgositsile's work, combine lyricism with an unmuted call to arms, as in these lines from "Dawn":

Remember in baton boot and bullet ritual
The bloodhounds of Monster Vorster wrote
SOWETO over the belly of my land
with the indelible blood of infants
So the young are no longer young
Not that they demand a hasty death

Any early interest in fiction was replaced by the sheer urgency of communication that Kgositsile felt. As he said later, "In a situation of oppression, there are no choices beyond didactic writing: either you are a tool of oppression or an instrument of liberation."

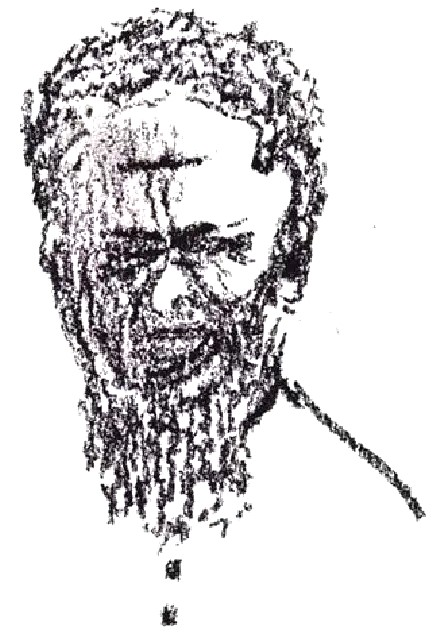
Keorapetse Kgositsile, South Africa's National Poet (charcoal on paper, by Amitabh Mitra)

== The years of exile ==
In 1961, under considerable pressure both for himself and as part of a government effort to shut down New Age, Kgositile was urged by the African National Congress, of which he was a vocal member, to leave the country. He went initially to Dar es Salaam to write for Spearhead magazine (unrelated to the right-wing British magazine of the same name), but the following year emigrated to the United States. He studied at a series of universities, beginning with Lincoln University in Pennsylvania, where he "spent a lot of time in the library trying to read as much black literature as I could lay my hands on."

After studying at the University of New Hampshire and The New School for Social Research, Kgositsile entered the Master of Fine Arts program in creative writing at Columbia University. At the same time, he published his first collection of poems, Spirits Unchained. The collection was well received, and he was given a Harlem Cultural Council Poetry Award and a National Endowment for the Arts Poetry Award. He graduated from Columbia in 1971, and remained in New York, teaching and giving his characteristically dynamic readings in downtown clubs and as part of the Uptown Black Arts Movement. Kgositsile's most influential collection, My Name is Afrika, was published in that year. The response, including an introduction to the book by Gwendolyn Brooks, established Kgositsile as a leading African-American poet. The Last Poets, a group of revolutionary African-American poets, took their name from one of his poems.

=== Influence of jazz and the black aesthetic ===
Jazz was particularly important to Kgositsile's sense of black American culture and his own place in it. He saw John Coltrane, Nina Simone, Billie Holiday, B. B. King, and many others in the jazz clubs of New York, and wrote to them and of them in his poems. Jazz was crucial to Kgositsile's most influential idea: his sense of a worldwide African diaspora united by an ear for a certain quintessentially black sound. He wrote of the black aesthetic he pursued and celebrated:

There is nothing like art—in the oppressor's sense of art. There is only movement. Force. Creative power. The walk of Sophiatown tsotsi or my Harlem brother on Lenox Avenue. Field Hollers. The Blues. A Trane riff. Marvin Gaye or mbaqanga. Anguished happiness. Creative power, in whatever form it is released, moves like the dancer's muscles.

Freedom from a constricting white aesthetic sensibility and the discovery of the rhythmic experience common to black people of all the world were, for Kgositsile, two sides of the same struggle.

=== Black theatre ===
Kgositsile also became active in theater while in New York, founding the Black Arts Theatre in Harlem. He saw black theater as a fundamentally revolutionary activity, whose ambition must be the destruction of the ingrained habits of thought responsible for perceptions of black people both by white people and by themselves. He wrote:

We will be destroying the symbols which have facilitated our captivity. We will be creating and establishing symbols to facilitate our necessary and constant beginning.

The Black Arts Theatre was part of a larger project aimed at the creation of literary black voice unafraid to be militant. Kgositsile argued persistently against the idea of Négritude, a purely aesthetic conception of black culture, on the grounds that it was dependent on white aesthetic models of perception, a process he called "fornicating with the white eye". This work took place while Kgositsile was teaching at Columbia in the earlier 1970s; he left to work briefly at Black Dialogue Magazine.

== Return to Africa ==
In 1975, Kgositsile decided to return to Africa, despite his blossoming career in the United States, and took up a teaching position at the University of Dar es Salaam, in Tanzania. In 1978, he married another ANC exile, Baleka Mbete, who was also living in Tanzania. Still from exile, he renewed his activities with the ANC, founding its Department of Education in 1977 and its Department of Arts and Culture in 1983; he became Deputy Secretary in 1987. Kgositsile taught at several schools in different parts of Africa, including Kenya, Botswana, and Zambia. Throughout this period he was banned in South Africa, but in 1990 the Congress of South African Writers (COSAW), with which he was already associated, decided to attempt a publication within the country. The successful result was When the Clouds Clear, a collection of poems from other volumes, which was Kgositsile's first book to be available in his native country.

=== "Your destination remains / Elusive" ===
In July 1990, after 29 years in exile, Kgositsile returned to South Africa. He arrived in a country wholly different from the one he had left, transformed by the beginning of the end of apartheid and the release and later the political triumph of Nelson Mandela. In 1990, however, it was still a place of great confusion, particularly for the many exiled black writers, artists, and intellectuals pouring into the country. In a 1991 essay, "Crossing Borders Without Leaving", Kgostitsile describes his first trip back to Johannesburg, where he was sponsored by COSAW: "Here are my colleagues and hosts. Can you deal with that? Hosts! In my own country." But it is not his country anymore: "there are no memories here. The streets of Johannesburg cannot claim me. I cannot claim them either." Still, he returned to the country as a kind of hero to young black writers and activists:

Usually, when we met, there would be a little amused giggle or mischievous grin from them as we shook hands and hugged or kissed, depending on the gender. When I would want to find out what the joke was so that we could share it if I also found it funny, one or several of them would recite some of my work, complete with the sound of my voice to the degree that had I heard the recitation without seeing who was reciting, I would probably have said, "Wonder when I recorded that."

Despite that sense of distance from the country, he dove immediately back into politics and cultural activism, and was quick to say that less had changed than should have: "there is the reality," he said in a 1992 interview, "that the South Africa that alienated black people to a very large extent still exists." Kgositsile was quick to criticize black leaders as well as white for this status quo, accusing the ANC of "being criminally backward when it comes to questions of culture and its place in society or struggle." In the early 1990s he served as vice president of COSAW, fostering the careers of young writers while continuing his steady critique of South African politics.

Kgositsile's most recent poems are more conversational and perhaps less lyrical than his earlier work, and, compared to his once-fiery nationalism, they are muted, and even skeptical. They speak of doubt rather than certainty, a doubt often reinforced by rhythmical understatement, as in the short, uneven lines of "Recollections":

Though you remain
Convinced
To be alive
You must have somewhere
To go
Your destination remains
Elusive.

In 2009, Bra Willie was part of the Beyond Words UK tour that also featured South African poets Don Mattera, Lesego Rampolokeng, Phillippa Yaa de Villiers and Lebo Mashile (presented by Apples & Snakes in association with Sustained Theatre, funded by the British Council South Africa, Arts Council England and the South African government).

In 2013, he was elected as the Director of Culture Department and one of the first Executive Committee Members of the SA-China People's Friendship Association.

Kgositsile returned to the United States several times, including for a visiting professorship at the New School. He was a member of the editorial board of This Day newspaper in Johannesburg, and remained at the forefront of contemporary South African literature.

In January 2023, the University of Nebraska Press published the posthumous volume Keorapetse Kgositsile: Collected Poems, 1969–2018, edited and with an introduction by Phillippa Yaa de Villiers and Uhuru Portia Phalafal.

== Personal life ==
Kgositsile's former wife, Baleka Mbete (they had married in 1978, while both living in exile in Tanzania), is the former Deputy President of South Africa; Speaker of the National Assembly of South Africa since 21 May 2014 and chairperson of the African National Congress. With Baleka, he had his first son Duma and daughter Nkuli. Kgositsile's daughter Ipeleng (from his previous marriage to the late Melba Johnson Kgositsile) is a journalist and fiction writer who has written for Vibe and Essence magazines. Kgositsile had his second son, Thebe Neruda Kgositsile (given his middle name after the poet Pablo Neruda), with Cheryl Harris, a law professor at University of California, Los Angeles. Thebe is better known as a hip-hop artist under the stage name Earl Sweatshirt.

Kgositsile was posthumously featured, alongside Harris, on the song "Playing Possum" from Sweatshirt's 2018 album Some Rap Songs.

== Death ==
After a short illness, Kgositsile died aged 79 on 3 January 2018 at Johannesburg's Milpark Hospital.

== Awards ==
The many literary awards he received include the Gwendolyn Brooks Poetry Prize, the Harlem Cultural Council Poetry Award, the Conrad Kent Rivers Memorial Poetry Award, and the Herman Charles Bosman Prize.

In 2008, Kgositsile was awarded the national Order of Ikhamanga Silver (OIS) "For excellent achievements in the field of literature and using these exceptional talents to expose the evils of the system of apartheid to the world."

== Bibliography ==
=== Poetry collections ===
- Spirits Unchained. Detroit: Broadside Press, 1969.
- For Melba: Poems. Chicago: Third World Press, 1970.
- My Name is Afrika; introduction by Gwendolyn Brooks. New York: Doubleday, 1971.
- Places and Bloodstains: Notes for Ipeleng. Oakland, California: Achebe Publications, 1975.
- The Present is a Dangerous Place to Live. Chicago: Third World Press, 1975. 2nd edition 1993. ISBN 978-0883780572.
- When the Clouds Clear. Johannesburg: Congress of South African Writers, 1990.
- To the Bitter End. Chicago: Third World Press, 1995. ISBN 978-0883780824.
- If I Could Sing: Selected Poems. Roggebaai, South Africa: Kwela Books, and Plumstead, South Africa: Snailpress, 2002. ISBN 978-0795701269.
- This Way I Salute You. Cape Town: Kwela Books, and Snailpress, 2004. ISBN 978-0795701825.
- Beyond Words: South African Poetics, with Don Mattera, Lebo Mashile and Phillippa Yaa de Villiers; foreword by Margaret Busby. Flipped Eye Publishing, 2009. ISBN 978-1905233304.
- Keorapetse Kgositsile: Collected Poems, 1969–2018, edited and with an introduction by Phillippa Yaa de Villiers and Uhuru Portia Phalafal. University of Nebraska Press, ISBN 978-1-4962-2115-5.

=== Other books ===
- (editor) The Word Is Here: Poetry from Modern Africa. New York: Anchor, 1973. ISBN 978-0385015165.
- Approaches to Poetry Writing. Chicago: Third World Press, 1994. ISBN 978-0883781760.
