= This Day (disambiguation) =

This Day is a Nigerian newspaper.

This Day may also refer to:

- This Day (South Africa), defunct South African newspaper and sister publication to the Nigerian newspaper
- "This Day" (song), by Emma's Imagination, 2010
- "This Day", a song by Audio Adrenaline from Underdog, 1999
- "This Day", a song by Emil Bulls from Porcelain, 2003
- 365 Days: This Day, 2022 Polish film
