= Cheryl Harris =

American law professor

- Born: Cheryl Irene Harris
- Education: Wellesley College (BA); Northwestern University (JD)
- Occupations: Legal scholar; critical race theorist; law professor
- Spouse: Keorapetse Kgositsile (separated)
- Children: Thebe Kgositsile
- Website: UCLA faculty profile

Cheryl Irene Harris is an American legal scholar and critical race theorist. She is a professor of civil rights and civil liberties and the Rosalinde and Arthur Gilbert Foundation Chair at the University of California, Los Angeles School of Law.

Harris gained national recognition with her paper, "Whiteness as Property", published in the June 1993 edition of the Harvard Law Review, which argues that "the law has come to embody and legitimize benefits that accrue to citizens just because they’re white" and examines how white racial identity operates as a legally protected form of value.

Harris received her Bachelor of the Arts degree from Wellesley College in 1973 and her Juris Doctor degree from the Northwestern University Pritzker School of Law in 1978.

Harris was married to activist Keorapetse Kgositsile, together having rapper Earl Sweatshirt. On December 7, 2019, she and Earl met at the Museum of Contemporary Art, Los Angeles and spoke on academia and music.

== Career ==
Harris worked as an appellate and trial litigator in Chicago, working with prominent criminal defense firms and devoting pro bono work to advance "major civil and human rights projects." Later, Harris became a senior legal advisor in the City's Office of Legal Counsel during the administration of Chicago's first Black mayor, Harold Washington, where she worked to foster the municipal government's goals of transparency, accountability, and racial equity.

Harris began teaching at Chicago-Kent College of Law in 1990. In 1991, she began work promoting exchanges between U.S. legal scholars and South African lawyers during the drafting of South Africa's first democratic constitution. Harris participated as a human rights delegate to global conflict zones, including Haiti and Northern Ireland.

Harris joined the UCLA School of Law faculty in 1998. She played a key role in founding the school's Critical Race Studies Program and has served as its faculty director on multiple occasions. Additionally, she served as UCLA's Department of African American Studies chair from 2014-2016, during the developmental years of the program. Harris currently serves as the Rosalinde and Arthur Gilbert Foundation Chair and teaches Constitutional Law, Civil Rights, Employment Discrimination, Critical Race Theory, and Race Conscious Remedies.

== Whiteness as Property ==
Harris is most renowned for her paper, "Whiteness as Property." Published in the June 1993 edition of the Harvard Law Review, the paper is considered to be a foundational document in modern critical race theory. In the paper, Harris introduces the concept that "whiteness" is based not on mere biological difference, but is instead constructed on supremacy and domination, and functions as a form of property in society through both the privileges it allows both written in law and public practice, and the exclusion of other races from said privilege. Harris's insights on the paper were shaped in part by her earlier work as an organizer of dialogue between legal scholars hailing from the United States and South African lawyers during the expansion of South Africa's establishing democratic constitution. This multicultural effort granted additional context on the nature of racial identity and how legal system construct and protect racial hierarchy.

Harris argues that the concept of whiteness as property developed alongside the institution of chattel slavery in the United States, and continued into the era of segregation, where racial identity determined access to freedom in every aspect. Harris draws on historical interpretations of what qualifies as property in order to further her point, including Founding Father James Madison's 1792 essay entitled "Property," from which Harris quotes Madison's belief that property "embraces every thing to which a man may attach a value and have a right." Harris utilizes Madison's broad definition to demonstrate that, in the founding era of the United States, property was understood to include not only material possessions but also a range of crucial personal liberties. As she explains, these rights were considered vital for human well-being, and included the rights to “freedom of expression, freedom of conscience, freedom from bodily harm, and free and equal opportunities to use personal faculties.”

Harris discusses the historical phenomenon of racial "passing" to highlight the absurdity and artificiality of racial identity. Drawing on the experiences of her grandmother and thousands of others in the antebellum south and greater United States, Harris reflects on how these individuals managed to cross racial barriers despite being considered Black according to the "one-drop rule." Harris argues that despite these individuals appearing white and being accepted into the white community, the law demanded that blood alone be treated as the definer of race, Harris points out that these legal categorizations were erratic and unreliable, but were ultimately served to protect whiteness as an exclusive, valuable form of property. By insisting on rigid legal boundaries even when social interactions contradicted them, the law reinforced racial superiority so that "even blacks who did not look black were kept in their place." Furthermore, Harris elaborates on the mental toll that "passing" maintained on those able to, and she makes the distinction that this act was wholly involuntary and one of both of self-preservation and self-sacrifice. Harris writes, "The effect of protecting whiteness at law was to devalue those who were not white by coercing them to deny their identity in order to survive."

In the article, Harris investigates the ties between racial identity and economic class, examining the inclination of white working class people to align themselves with white elites in lieu of black working class individuals with whom they possess far more congruities. Harris cites W.E.B. Du Bois's Black Reconstruction, in which Du Bois outlines the benefits of this association of race above class. Du Bois notes that beyond the obvious benefits of higher wages, there is a second, arguably more important layer of public privilege, which includes access to public parks, white law enforcement and judicial sympathies, and white schools far superior, costing "anywhere from twice to ten times as much per capita as the colored schools." Harris argues that these privileges incentivized the white working class to cherish and protect their racial identity, and in doing so, assisted in maintaining the system of racial, and thereby class, hierarchy that valued whiteness at every level in American society.

== Awards ==
Harris has received multiple awards. In 2005, she received the ACLU Foundation of Southern California's Distinguished Professor Award for Civil Rights Education. In 2018, she received UCLA's Rutter Award for Excellence in Teaching, four years later, she earned UCLA's Distinguished Teaching Award. In addition to her honors as a law professor, the 2024 UCLA Academic Senate granted Harris the Faculty Award for Career Commitment to Diversity, an accolade part of the greater Diversity, Equity, and Inclusion Awards maintained by the senate.

== Other works ==
"Whiteness as Property" remains Harris's most notable and cited work, but she remains a consistent contributor to the academic sphere of critical race theory, examining the relationships between law, race, and inequality. Some of her works include:

- Law Professors of Color and the Academy, 68 Chicago-Kent Law Review 331 (1992). Reprinted in Critical Race Feminism (edited by A. Wing, NYU Press, 1997).
- Book Review, Bell’s Blues, 60 University of Chicago Law Review 783-93 (1993). Reviewing Faces at the Bottom of the Well, by Derrick Bell.
- African Americans and the Right to Self-Determination: The Duties Associated with the Right to Self-Determination, 17 Hamline Law Review 60 (1993).
- Myths of Race and Gender in the Trials of O.J. Simpson and Susan Smith–Spectacles of Our Times, 35 Washburn Law Journal 225-53 (1996).
- Finding Sojourner's Truth: Race, Gender and the Institution of Slavery, 18 Cardozo Law Journal 309-409 (1997).
- Re-Imagining Community, 47 UCLA Law Review 1839-42 (2000).
- Equal Treatment and the Reproduction of Inequality, 69 Fordham Law Review 1753-83 (2001).
- Critical Race Studies: An Introduction, 49 UCLA Law Review 1215-39 (2002).
- What the Supreme Court did not Hear in Grutter and Gratz, 51 Drake Law Review 697-713 (2003).
- Book Review, Mining in Hard Ground, 116 Harvard Law Review 2487-2539 (2003). Reviewing The Miner’s Canary, by Lani Guinier and Gerald Torres.
- The Story of Plessy v. Ferguson: The Death and Resurrection of Racial Formalism, in Constitutional Law Stories, (edited by Michael Dorff, Foundation Press, 2004).
- In the Shadow of Plessy, 7 University of Pennsylvania Journal of Constitutional Law 867 (2005).
- Whitewashing Race: Scapegoating Culture, 94 California Law Review 907-943 (2006). Reviewing Whitewashing Race: The Myth of a Color-Blind Society, by Michael K. Brown.
- 'Too Pure an Air:' Somerset's Legacy from Anti-slavery to Colorblindness, 13 Texas Wesleyan Law Review 439-58 (2007).
- The New Racial Preferences (with Devon Carbado), California Law Review 1139-1214 (2008).
- Reading Ricci: Whitening Discrimination, Racing Test Fairness (with Kimberly West-Faulcon), 58 UCLA Law Review 73-165 (2010).
- Undocumented Criminal Procedure (with Devon Carbado), 58 UCLA Law Review 1543-1616 (2011).
- Limiting Equality: The Divergence and Convergence of Title VII and Equal Protection, 2014 University of Chicago Legal Forum 95 (2014).
- Ricci v. Destefano: Lost at the Intersection, 91 Denver University Law Review 1121 (2015).
- Fisher's Foibles: From Race and Class to Class Not Race, 64 UCLA Law Review Discourse 648 (2017)
- Back to the Future: Recentering the Political Outsider, 118 Columbia Law Review Online 153 (2018).
- Intersectionality at 30: Mapping the Margins of Anti-Essentialism, Intersectionality, and Dominance Theory (with Devon Carbado), 132 Harvard Law Review 2193 (2019).
