= Manne Dipico =

Manne Emsley Dipico, first Premier of the Northern Cape Province, South Africa, was born in Kimberley on 21 April 1959. He was appointed Chairman of the Nuclear Energy Corporation of South Africa (Necsa) in 2006. He is Chairman of Ponahalo Holdings (De Beers Group) and Deputy Chairman of De Beers Consolidated Mines Ltd. He is the first President of SA-China People's Friendship Association.

== Education and early political involvement ==
Dipico matriculated from St Boniface High School in Kimberley in 1979, going on to study for a Bachelor of Arts at the University of Fort Hare. In 1996 he obtained a Leadership Diploma at the Wharton School of Business at the University of Pennsylvania in the United States of America.

While at Fort Hare Dipico was an executive member of the Azanian Students Organisation (Azaso), joining underground structures of the African National Congress (ANC) in the Eastern Cape in 1982. In the Northern Cape he was Regional Executive member of the United Democratic Front in 1985-6, and executive member of the Galeshewe Youth Organisation (Gayo) in 1982-4.

Dipico was detained in Ciskei in 1984 during the State of Emergency; and in Kimberley was detained in 1986 and again in 1987, charged with terrorism, subversion and promoting and furthering the aims of a banned organization. He was sentenced and imprisoned from 1987 to 1990.

Dipico was a member of the National Union of Mineworkers, serving as Regional Organiser in 1985-7 and as Education Co-ordinator in 1990.

He became Regional Secretary of the African National Congress in the Northern Cape in 1991, following the un-banning of the organization in South Africa, becoming its Provincial Chairman in 1992. He was on the Central Committee of the South African Communist Party in 1995-8.

== Premiership ==
With the creation of the Northern Cape Province in 1994, Manne Dipico, as Chairman of the ANC, became its first Premier, serving in this capacity until 2004. He traveled to Canada in 1994 to gain insight into the role of premiers there.

In 2001 ANC delegates unanimously voted in Manne Dipico as the ANC Provincial Chairperson for the fourth time in succession.

He was succeeded by Elizabeth Dipuo Peters as Premier in 2004.

== Other roles ==
Dipico has served with various organizations:

- Board member Helen Joseph Development Centre, Galeshewe
- Patron, Griqualand West Rugby Football Union, 1996
- President, St Johns Ambulance, 1995
- Patron, Helen Bishop School for the Mentally Handicapped, 1994
- Member, Lions, 1994
- Honorary President, Kimberley Children's Choir
- President, SA-China People's Friendship Association

Political offices
Preceded by Kobus Meiring as Administrator of the Cape Province	Premier of the Northern Cape; 7 May 1994 – 11 May 1998	Succeeded by Dipuo Peters
