= The Alchemy of Race and Rights =

Memoir by Patricia J. Williams

The Alchemy of Race and Rights: Diary of a Law Professor
- Author: Patricia J. Williams
- Language: English
- Subject: Law, U.S. history, race
- Genre: Critical legal studies, critical race studies, memoir
- Publisher: Harvard University Press
- Publication date: 1991
- Publication place: United States
- Pages: 272
- ISBN: 9780674014718
- Website: http://www.hup.harvard.edu/catalog.php?isbn=9780674014718

The Alchemy of Race and Rights: Diary of a Law Professor is a memoir and critical legal studies text by Columbia University law professor Patricia J. Williams. Williams won a MacArthur Fellowship in part in recognition of the book's achievements.

== Publication ==
Williams published The Alchemy of Race and Rights with Harvard University Press in 1991. A paperback edition was published in March 1992.

== Subject matter ==
Writing in 1998, The New York Times said that in The Alchemy of Race and Rights, Williams "used autobiography to explore the relationship among law, race, perceptions of rights and liberation." The Washington Post described the book as "targeting the legal mind, particularly its intersections with matters of race and gender."

== Reception ==
=== Reviews ===
Writing in 2015, the Los Angeles Review of Books invoked The Alchemy of Race and Rights as a "seminal work" on "the logic of rights...state domination...[and] legal protection." The New York Times said that with the book, "Williams changed the voice of legal scholarship." Writing for the Boston Review in 1991, Wendy Brown said, "As a meditation on the searing injuries of racism, on hidden histories in the entrails of legal cases, or on the bankrupt character of contemporary American political life, the effect of Williams's alchemy is powerful beyond measure."

=== Awards ===
In 1992, Williams won the Bruce K. Gould Book Award for "outstanding publication related to the law, legal profession or legal system" for The Alchemy of Race and Rights. When Williams won the MacArthur "genius grant" in 2000, the Foundation cited "[h]er highly regarded first book, The Alchemy of Race and Rights: A Diary of a Law Professor (1991)...an autobiographical work that illuminates some of America’s most complex problems."
