= Patricia J. Williams =

American legal and race critical scholar (born 1951)

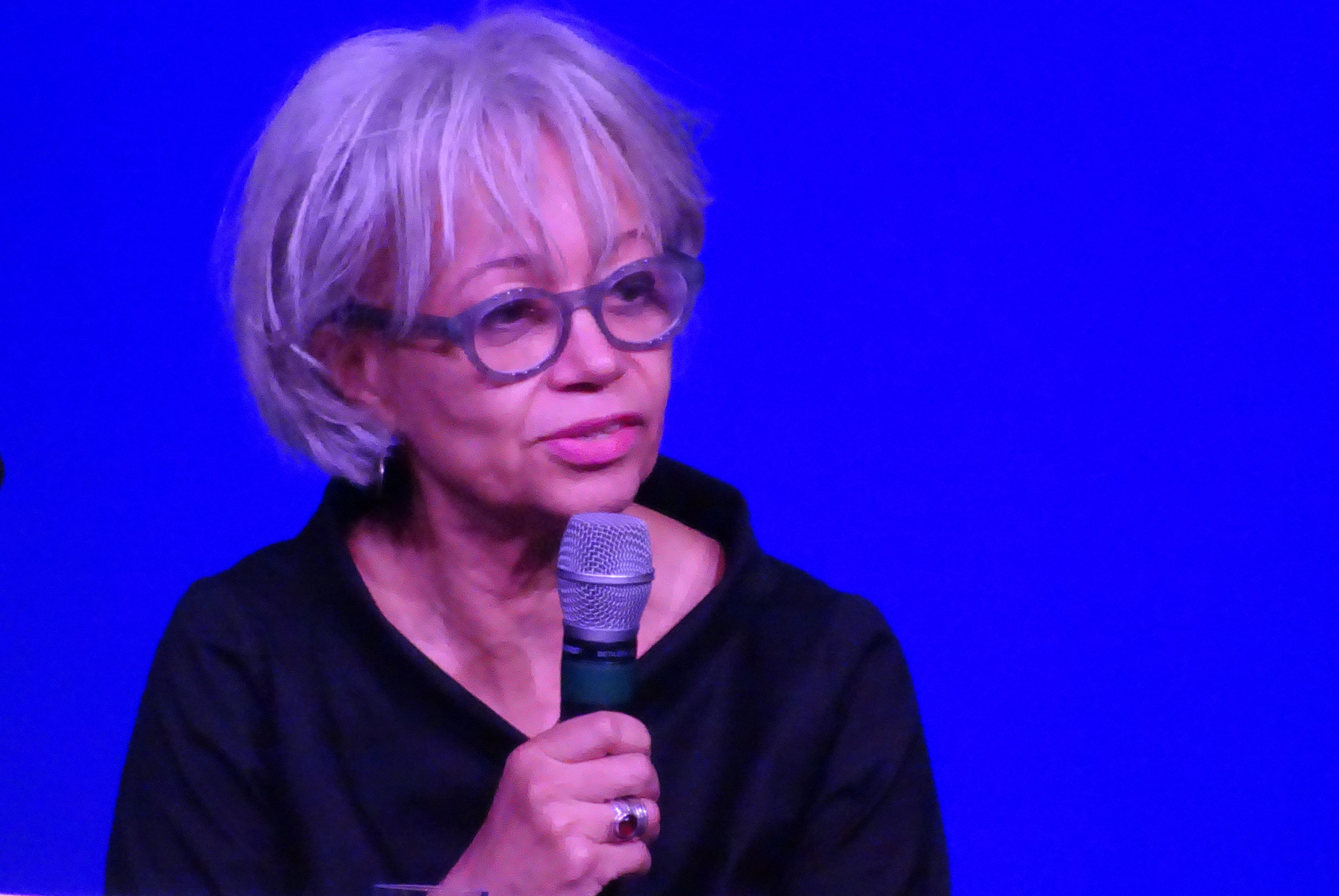
- Born: Patricia Joyce Williams; August 28, 1951 (age 75); Boston, Massachusetts, U.S.
- Education: Wellesley College (BA); Harvard University (JD)
- Occupation: Legal scholar
- Awards: Windham-Campbell Literature Prize (2025)

Patricia J. Williams (born August 28, 1951) is an American legal scholar and a proponent of critical race theory, a school of legal thought that emphasizes race as a fundamental determinant of the American legal system.

== Early life ==
Patricia Joyce Williams was born in Boston in 1951. Williams received her bachelor's degree from Wellesley College in 1972, and her Juris Doctor from Harvard Law School in 1975.

== Career ==
Williams worked as a consumer advocate in the office of the City Attorney in Los Angeles, was a fellow in the School of Criticism and Theory at Dartmouth College and served as associate professor at the University of Wisconsin Law School and its department of women's studies. She was formerly the James L. Dohr Professor of Law at Columbia University, where she has taught since 1991.

As of July 1, 2019, she is the incoming Director of Law, Technology, and Ethics at Northeastern University.

Williams has served on the advisory council for the Medgar Evers College for Law and Social Justice of the City University of New York, the board of trustees of Wellesley College, and on the board of governors for the Society of American Law Teachers, among others.

Williams writes a column for The Nation magazine titled "Diary of a Mad Law Professor." Her column for The Nation has recently changed from bi-weekly to monthly. The Mad-Law-Professor (SM) is also the name of a super hero that she created.

== Awards and honors ==
Williams was the recipient of a MacArthur Fellowship, which she held from June 2000 until June 2005.

On March 1, 2013, Columbia Law School's Center for Gender & Sexuality Law honored her with a symposium, featuring Anita Hill, Lani Guinier, Anna Deavere Smith, and others.

Williams was elected a Member of the American Philosophical Society in 2019.

On March 30, 2022, she received an honorary degree from the Faculty of Law, University of Antwerp "in recognition of her expertise in the field of race, gender, literature & law and her outstanding contribution to legal and ethical debates on society, science and technology in the light of individual autonomy and identity."

In 2025, Williams was named as the recipient of a Windham-Campbell Literature Prize in the non-fiction category.

== Bibliography ==
- The Alchemy of Race and Rights: A Diary of a Law Professor (1991) (ISBN 0-674-01470-7)
- The Rooster's Egg (1995) (ISBN 0-674-77942-8)
- Seeing a Color-Blind Future: The Paradox of Race (1997) (ISBN 0-374-52533-1)
- Open House: Of Family, Friends, Food, Piano Lessons, and the Search for a Room of My Own (2004) (ISBN 0-374-11407-2)
- The Blind Goddess: A Reader on Race and Justice (2011) (ISBN 1-595-58699-7)
- The Best Day Ever (1998)
- Giving a Damn: Racism, Romance and Gone with the Wind (2021) (ISBN 978-0008404505)
