= Ryan De Jongh =

South African soccer player

Personal information
- Date of birth: 26 November 1989 (age 36)
- Place of birth: Westbury, South Africa
- Position: Defensive midfielder

Senior career*
Years	Team	Apps	(Gls)
2010–2011	FC AK		
2011–2016	Maritzburg United	72	(1)
2016–2018	Platinum Stars	47	(0)
2018–2021	Bloemfontein Celtic	27	(0)
2021–2022	Sekhukhune United	7	(0)
- * Club domestic league appearances and goals as of 30 October 2022

Ryan De Jongh (born 26 November 1989) is a South African soccer player who last played as a defensive midfielder for South African Premier Division side Sekhukhune United. De Jongh was born in Westbury.
