= SA-China People's Friendship Association =

- Logo of SACPFA
- Founded: March 21, 2013
- Location: 6 Floor, Sandton City Office Tower, Sandton, 2146, Johannesburg, South Africa
- Region served: South Africa
- Website: www.sacpfa.com

SA-China People's Friendship Association (SACPFA) is the only people's association for friendship with China in South Africa. SACPFA was founded in Johannesburg, South Africa on March 21, 2013. Also, its branches cover Cape Town in South Africa, Shanghai and Beijing in China.

Its aims are to improve mutual understanding and trust, promote exchange and cooperation between the people of South Africa and China, maintain world peace and promote common development. SACPFA is committed to carrying out all-round, multi-level, wild-ranging friendly exchange between the people of both countries, and enhancing economic cooperation and cultural exchange.

== Main objectives ==
- Developing non-governmental friendship with friendly social organizations and people from all walks of life by organizing exchange of visits of delegations, commemorative activities, and joint activities such as seminars, talks, forums to enhance mutual understanding and trust for friendship between both countries.
- Promoting international cooperation by establishing a cooperation platform to further multi-area cooperation in areas such as the economy, trade, society, science and technology, talents, among others.
- Launching cultural exchange between South Africa and China.
- Promoting local governmental communication and coordination, establishing and developing friendship-city and friendship-community relations between South Africa and China.
- Organising social welfare activities to advance the friendship between South Africa and China.
- Organising other bilateral non-governmental cooperation between the people of South Africa and those of China.

== Structure ==
=== Members' Representative Assembly ===
The highest organ of authority of the Association is its Members' Representative Assembly, which has a term of five years.

=== Committee ===
The committee is the executive organ of the Members’ Representative Assembly, which carries out the daily work of the Association and will account to the Members' Representative Assembly. The term of each Committee is five years and at least one committee session shall be convened every year.

==== Honorary Committee Members ====
The Committee may invite prominent figures to be the Honorary Committee Members.

===== Honorary President =====
Nomvula Mokonyane
Minister of Water and sanitation in the cabinet of South Africa, former Premier of Gauteng province, and in the African National Congress (ANC) National Working Committee

Elias Sekgobelo Magashule
Premier of Free State province, Provincial Chairperson of the ANC in the Free State, and in the ANC National Working Committee

===== Honorary Chairman =====
Marius Fransman
Deputy Minister of the DIRCO

Jerry Matthews Matjila
Director General of the DIRCO

Anil Sooklal
Deputy Director-General of Asia and Middle East of the DIRCO

===== Honorary Advisor =====
Liu GuijinChina's former ambassador in South Africa and the first Special Representative of the Chinese government in Africa.

=== Executive committee ===
The executive committee consists of the President, the Executive President, the Directors of each department and the Secretary-General. They preside over the daily work of the Association.

==== The 1st Executive Committee of SACPFA ====
President: Manne Dipico
Executive President: Tom Cao
Secretary General: Eddy Maloka
Director of Organization Department: Zhang Zhengdi
Director of Culture Department: Keorapetse Kgositsile
Director of Social Relations Department: Mark Wang
Director of Corporate Department: Bian Dequan
Legal Advisor: Ajay Sooklal
President of Cape Town Branch: Allie Baderoen

=== Secretariat ===
The Secretariat is a department of the executive committee that manages the daily work and executes the resolutions of Association. It consists of the Secretary General, Deputy Secretary General, and other staff. The current Secretary General is Eddy Maloka.

== Chronicle ==
=== Launch of SACPFA ===
On March 21, 2013, SACPFA was launched in Johannesburg, which turns a new page in the history of the non-governmental diplomacy between South Africa and China. The launch ceremony was succeeded by the first session of the first Committee along with the association who discussed and examined its guiding policies and plans for the future.
The launch of SACPFA is a part of a serial celebration of the 15th anniversary of the establishment of diplomatic relations between South Africa and China as well as the BRICS summit taking place in late March.

=== Signing memorandum of understanding with CPAFFC ===
On March 26, 2013, Manne Dipico, the President of SACPFA, and Li Xiaolin, the President of the Chinese People's Association for friendship with foreign countries (CPAFFC), signed a Memorandum of Understanding (MOU) at the Union Buildings in Pretoria. The signing of this MOU was the first of its kind as it was witnessed by the President of South Africa, Jacob Zuma and the General Secretary of the Chinese Communist Party, Xi Jinping, who is in South Africa on a State visit for the 5th BRICS summit in Durban.

=== Launch of the Cape Town Branch ===
On July 16, 2013, SACPFA Cape Town Branch was launched. The first President of the Cape Town Branch is Allie Baderoen.

== NGO exchanges ==
Since its launch, SACPFA has established good and cooperative relations with friendship associations from both China and South Africa.

- On March 26, 2013, Manne Dipico, the President of SACPFA, and Li Xiaolin, the President of the CPAFFC, signed a MOU at the Union Buildings in Pretoria.
- On May 15, 2013, Manne Dipico, the President of SACPFA and Eddy Maloka, the Secretary General had a meeting with the China Association for International Friendly Contact (CAIFC) delegation in Johannesburg.

== See also ==
"SACPFA Official Website"
