= Lebogang Mashile =

US-born South African actress, writer and poet (born 1979)

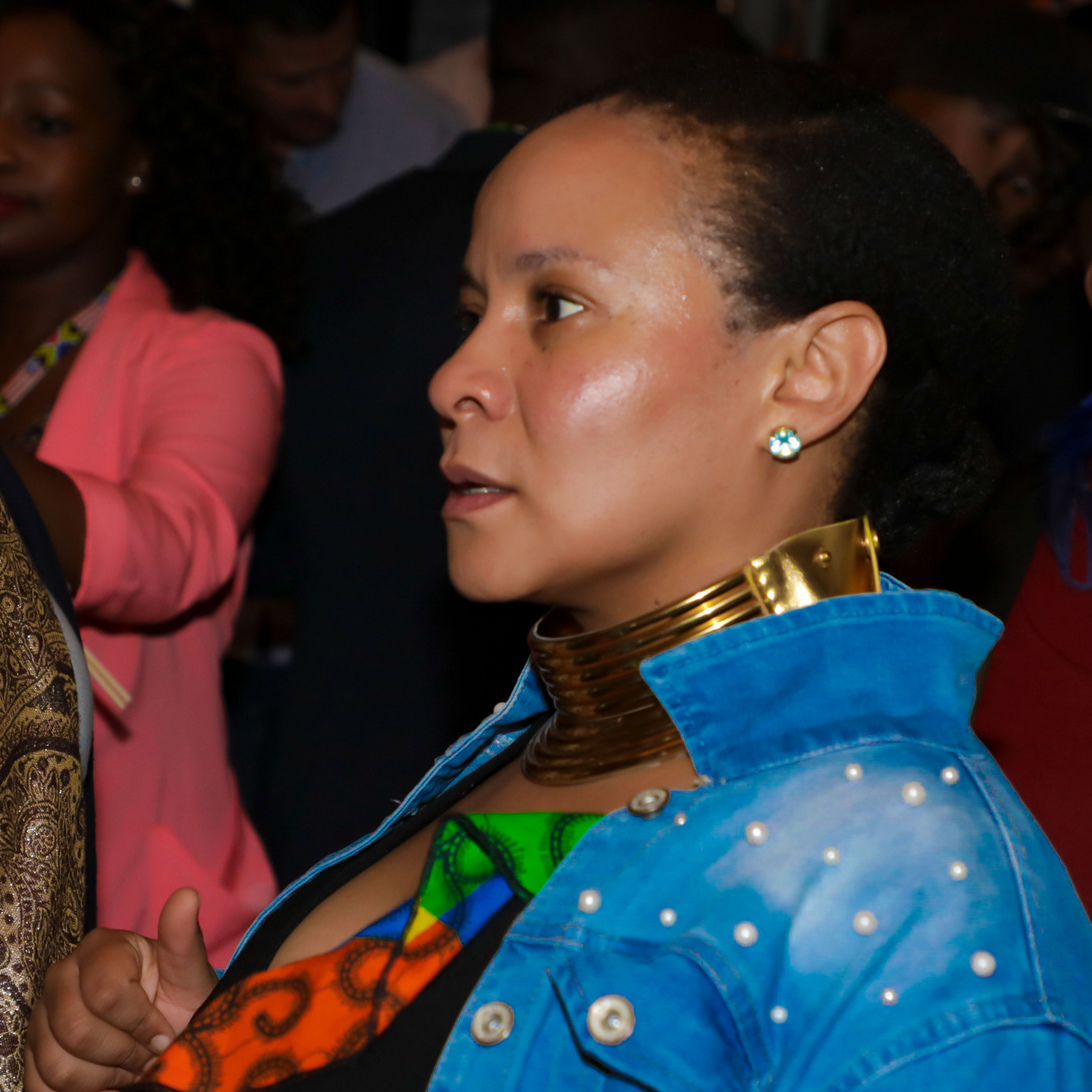
- Mashile in 2019
- Born: 7 February 1979 (age 47); Pawtucket, Rhode Island, US
- Education: Law and international relations, University of the Witwatersrand;
- Occupations: Poet, author, presenter, actress and producer
- Notable work: Hotel Rwanda
- Awards: Noma Award
- Website: lebomashile.com

Lebogang Mashile (born 7 February 1979) is an American-born South African performance poet, author, presenter, actress and producer.

== Biography ==
The daughter of exiled South African parents, Mashile was born in the United States, in Pawtucket, Rhode Island, and returned to South Africa in the mid-1990s after the end of apartheid. She began to study law and international relations at the University of the Witwatersrand but became more interested in the arts. With Myesha Jenkins, Ntsiki Mazwai and Napo Masheane, she founded the poetry group Feela Sistah.

She appeared in the 2004 film Hotel Rwanda and has performed in a number of theatre productions, including Threads, which combined dance, music and poetry. She also recorded a live performance album incorporating music and poetry, titled Lebo Mashile Live. She co-produced and hosted the documentary programme L’Attitude on SABC 1 and hosted a game show called Drawing the Line on SABC 2.

In 2005, she published her first poetry collection, In a Ribbon of Rhythm, for which she received the Noma Award in 2006. She was included in Beyond Words: South African Poetics (flipped eye publishing, 2009), alongside Keorapetse Kgositsile, Don Mattera and Phillippa Yaa de Villiers), and she is a contributor to the 2019 anthology New Daughters of Africa, edited by Margaret Busby.

Mashile and musician, performer, writer Majola released an EP in 2016.

== Awards and honours ==
Mashile was named one of South Africa's Awesome Women of 2005 by Cosmopolitan and one of the Top 100 youth in South Africa by the Mail & Guardian in 2006, 2007 and 2009.

In 2006, she was named the top personality in television by The Star in their annual Top 100 list, in 2007 she was the recipient of the City Press/Rapport Woman of Prestige Award, and was also named Woman of the Year for 2010 in the category of Arts and Culture by Glamour magazine.

Mashile was cited as one of the Top 100 Africans by New African magazine in 2011, and in 2012 she won the Art Ambassador award at the inaugural Mbokodo Awards for South African Women in the Arts. Mashile performed at the Opening of Parliament in 2009. She has been described as "probably the first name that comes to mind when thinking about a female writer making colossal waves in the poetry space".

== Selected works ==
- In a Ribbon of Rhythm, poetry (Oshun Books, 2005, ISBN 9781770070455)
- Flying Above the Sky, poetry (African Perspective, 2008, ISBN 9780620412414)
