= Whiteness as property =

Concept in critical race theory

Whiteness as property is a concept in critical race theory that holds that whiteness functions as a form of property in which white individuals have an asserted interest. Throughout American colonial and independent history, the concepts of property and race have developed side by side and grown intertwined, leading many to argue that whiteness and property are bridged. Whiteness as property began in legal theory and was introduced by law professor Cheryl Harris in 1993. The concept highlights how whiteness functions as a set of privileges codified and encoded in law and society. Through property law, whiteness has been structured and maintained, implicating issues of inequality and hierarchy.

Pulling from critical legal studies and property theory, the concept argues that whiteness meets the traditional criteria of property:

1. Whiteness includes the right to use and enjoyment, as it allows white individuals access to social, economic, and legal privileges and resources, such as freedom of movement and presumption of innocence.
2. Whiteness includes the right to exclusion, as it grants possessors the ability to exclude nonwhite people, such as in segregation, restrictive covenants, and immigration policy.
3. Whiteness has the right to transfer, meaning it can be passed down generationally.
4. Whiteness has the right to protection, meaning that through violence, legal doctrine, and policy, the legal system has played a role in maintaining whiteness as property.

Whiteness as property has been extended to other disciplines, such as sociology, cultural studies, and education.

== Background ==
In her paper published in the Harvard Law Review titled “Whiteness as Property,” Cheryl Harris introduced the concept to the legal academy and critical race theory. Harris noticed while reading Plessy v. Ferguson that Plessy’s legal team argued he was denied the property of whiteness when he was identified as Black and made to move to the designated space for Black people.

Harris argues that this idea of racialized property has its roots in slavery:

The social relations that produced racial identity as a justification for slavery also had implications for the conceptualization of property. This result was predictable, as the institution of slavery, lying at the very core of economic relations, was bound up with the idea of property. Through slavery, race and economic domination were fused.

Harris further argues that the concept also roots from land theft as a legal process, historically granting white people racialized access to land and the means of development. Whiteness exists as a reputation and status property, offering white individuals a valuable identity classification.

In anticipation of critics, Harris says that whiteness as property is inalienable rather than alienable and metaphysical rather than physical, as is rights-based property generally. The concept has become a cornerstone of critical race theory and faces both praise and backlash.

== Conceptual and theoretical development ==
Whiteness as property has expanded into other subjects and disciplines, sometimes inspiring new facets of the concept or improving existing ideas.

=== Wages of whiteness ===
David Roediger, a historian of racism and whiteness, builds on whiteness as property by arguing that poor whites historically gained the wages of whiteness by aligning themselves with white elites over working Black people. While they have made little to no material gain from this relationship, they still have the property of their whiteness, perhaps the only meaningful property they own.

=== Whiteness as capital ===
This concept describes white identity as not just property, but the means of accessing economic, political, and social power. White individuals are given privileges in workplaces, classrooms, and other contexts to achieve authority, status, and reputation. While whiteness as property focuses on how whiteness is a legal invention and asset, identity as capital sees it as that and also a leveraged and invisible advantage. Because housing, banking, and education all reward white norms, social capital is granted along racialized lines.

=== Whiteness as growth ===
This concept links whiteness with the growth imperative, indicating that as whiteness developed within a capitalist context, it took on the features of economic growthism/productivism. Whiteness has historically operated as fundamental to capitalistic growth driven by slavery and land theft. Whiteness as property sees white identity as a property interest asserted by white society, while whiteness as growth sees it also as embedded into the economic growth imperative of white capitalist society.

=== Masculinity as property ===
A socio-legal framework, this idea refers to how male identity and the masculinity associated with it operates as a form of property that one can gain from over gender minorities.

=== Fossil fuel racism ===
Fossil fuel racism impacts Black and brown communities where fossil fuel-based pollution and industry are located near vulnerable populations. The term is closely related to environmental racism, and illuminates the issues surrounding how climate change impacts the Global South disproportionately.

== Affirmative action discourse ==
The language of whiteness as property has been used to explain anti-affirmative action stances, as well as having influenced modern debate. Conservative activists and legal scholars argue that race-conscious admissions steals spots away from more deserving white students in a zero-sum game. Here, diverse student bodies are seen as a transgression of the right for white people to access higher education institutions. Pro-affirmative action scholars write that because the SFFA ruling dismantled race-conscious admissions but left legacy admissions intact, whiteness as property was protected and democratizing education was sacrificed.

Many journalists and writers have used the language of a "property interest" or "whiteness as property" when referring to what the SFFA ruling means for people of color and white dominance. The use of affirmative action in schools and workplaces is framed as trespassing into spaces without the correct qualities required for access, despite many describing the admissions practice as not offering unfair advantages, but a more fair playing field.

== Criticism ==
Critics of whiteness as property argue that it essentializes whiteness and ignores intersectionality. They argue that it treats whiteness as monolithic. Proponents counter that the concept provides a much-needed focus on systemic racism and racial injustice.

== See also ==
- Critical race theory
- Postmodernism
- Black-white binary
