= Tara J. Yosso =

American scholar of education and community knowledge

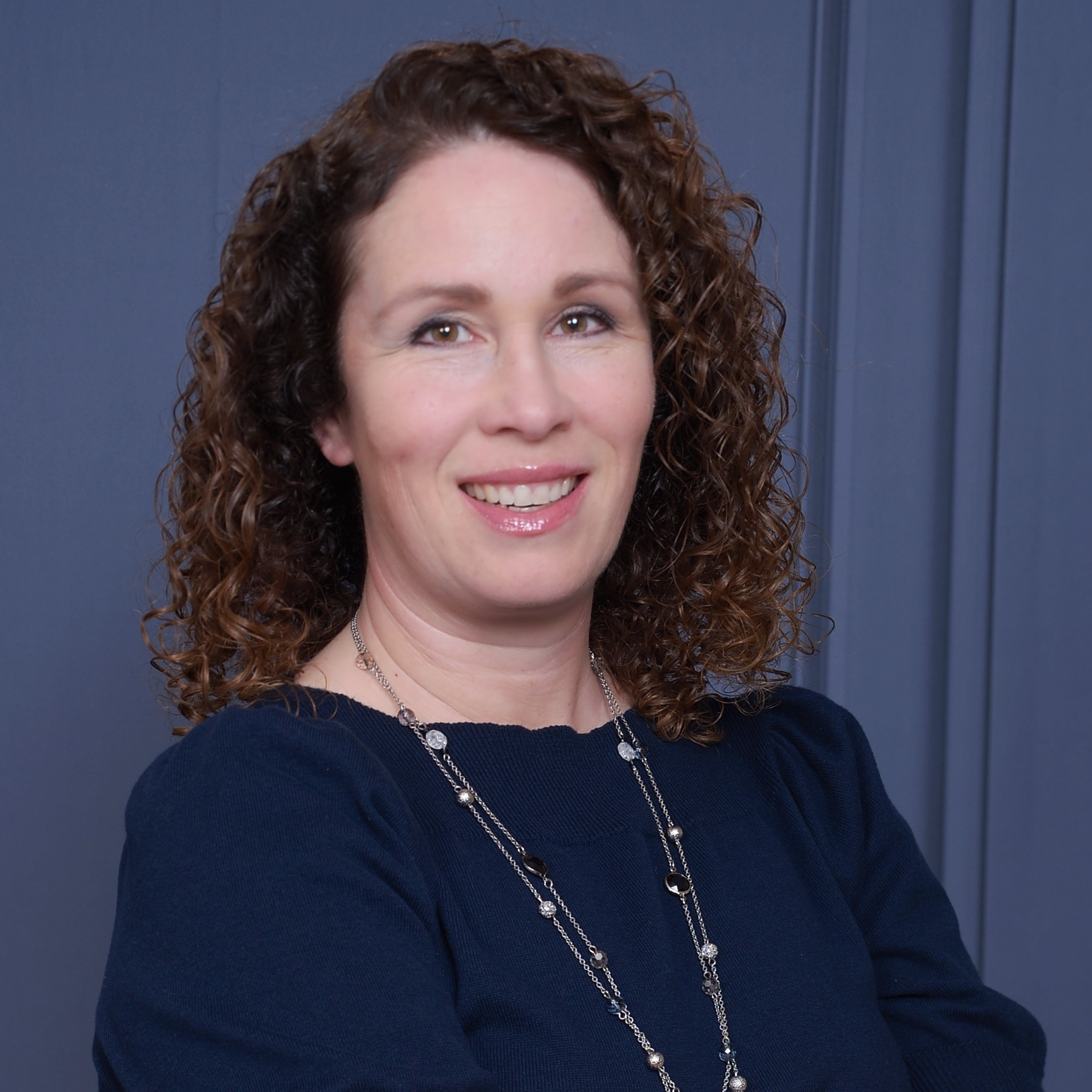
- Yosso in 2025
- Known for: Community Cultural Wealth framework

Academic background
- Education: University of California, Los Angeles (BA, PhD)
- Thesis: A Critical Race and LatCrit Approach to Media Literacy: Chicana/o Resistance to Visual Microaggressions (2000)
- Doctoral advisor: Daniel G. Solórzano

Academic work
- Discipline: Education
- Sub-discipline: Ethnic studies
- Institutions: University of California, Riverside

Tara J. Yosso is an American scholar of education whose work examines culture, community knowledge, and educational opportunity across K–12 and higher education. She is a professor in the School of Education at the University of California, Riverside.

== Early life and education ==
Yosso grew up in San José, California, where she attended public schools. She earned her Bachelor of Arts at the University of California, Los Angeles, where she created her own major, "The Social Psychology of Education with an emphasis in Chicana/o Studies" (1995). She continued at UCLA to complete her Doctor of Philosophy in Education, specializing in Urban Schooling with an emphasis in Chicana/o Studies and Visual Sociology, which she received in 2000.

Yosso's dissertation, A Critical Race and LatCrit Approach to Media Literacy: Chicana/o Resistance to Visual Microaggressions, linked racial microaggressions, stereotype threats, and the intersectionality of racialization for Latina/o students in film portrayals.

== Career ==
Yosso’s research spans education, sociology, ethnic studies, media studies, and community-engaged scholarship. Her work explores how educational institutions shape access, belonging, and opportunity, particularly during transitions from high school to college and from undergraduate to graduate education.

She created the Community Cultural Wealth framework, which focuses on the array of cultural knowledge, skills, relationships, and forms of resilience that communities draw upon in educational and institutional contexts.

== Awards and recognition ==
Her 2006 book Critical Race Counterstories along the Chicana/Chicano Educational Pipeline received the 2008 Critics’ Choice Book Award from the American Educational Studies Association.

She was named a Fellow of the American Educational Research Association in 2025 and received the 2023 Distinguished Research Contributions Lifetime Achievement Award from American Educational Research Association Division G. In 2022, the organization Color of Change established the Tara J. Yosso Award for Excellence in Counterstorytelling in Education.

Yosso appears in the Stanford/Elsevier Top 2% Scientists dataset.
