= Linda Greene =

American academic in the field of law

Linda Sheryl Greene is an American academic in the field of law. She was the first African-American woman to teach at Temple University Law School, and is the Evjue-Bascom Professor of law at the University of Wisconsin-Madison.

== Biography ==
Greene was born in California and graduated from the University of California, Berkeley Law School.

In 1978 Greene joined the Temple University Law School, becoming the first African-American woman to teach there. Then she joined the University of Oregon Law School in 1981 and became a tenured associate professor. She joined University of Wisconsin-Madison full-time with tenure in 1989. Her teaching is mostly concentrated in the areas of constitutional law, civil procedure, legislation, civil rights and sport law. She also holds a position at the University Of California at San Diego.

She has worked for media outlets such as the Wisconsin Public Television, Wisconsin Public Radio, The Miami Herald and The New York Times. She has written opinion pieces for The New York Times since 1992, such as "Giving Student Athletes a Voice", "Law Schools Need to Prepare Students To Pass Bar exam".

Greene has been involved in sports policymaking including 12 years with the United States Olympic Committee, seven years as a member of the University of Wisconsin Athletic Board, and as co-founder of the Black Women in Sports Foundation. Together with Tina Sloan Green, Alpha Alexander, and Nikki Franke. she established the foundation to encourage black women and girls to participate in all areas of sport.
