= Westbury, Johannesburg =

Westbury
- Location within Gauteng Location within South Africa
- Coordinates: 26.1823267°S 27.9732248°E
- Country: South Africa
- Province: Gauteng
- Municipality: City of Johannesburg
- Established: 1918

Area
  - Total: 1.03 km^{2} (0.40 sq mi)

Population (2011)
  - Total: 13,461
  - Density: 13,100/km^{2} (33,800/sq mi)

Racial makeup (2011)
  - Black African: 9.95%
  - Coloured: 87.69%
  - Indian/Asian: 0.85%
  - White: 0.17%
  - Other: 1.41%

First languages (2011)
  - Afrikaans: 56.93%
  - English: 36.66%
  - Tswana: 1.31%
  - Zulu: 1.26%
  - Other: 3.84%
- Time zone: UTC+2 (SAST)
- Postal code (street): 2093
- Area code: 011

Westbury is a suburb of Johannesburg, South Africa. It is located in the province of Gauteng. It is situated west of the Johannesburg CBD.

== History ==
Prior to the discovery of gold on the Witwatersrand in 1886, the suburb lay on farmland called Newlands that lay on the original farms called Waterval and Middlefontein. The suburb was established in May 1918 by the Johannesburg Town Council as an area for black residents and called it Newlands Location. The residents of Newlands objected to the name and during July 1919 its name was changed to Western Native Townships. It would undergo more name changes during Apartheid when it was declaimed as a black township on 2 January 1963 and proclaimed as the Western Coloured Township in July 1963 when forced removals were used to move coloured residents from Doornfontein and Pageview to this location. By 1967 it had its last name change when it became Westbury. Westbury is the first place black people could legally live in the City of Johannesburg.

It was built on a municipal landfill that discouraged whites from purchasing land on the adjacent Sophiatown, forcing the owner Herman Tobiansky to sell land indiscriminately to members of any race.

== Local events ==
=== 2018 protests ===
Protests were sparked by the death of Westbury resident, Heather Petersen, on 27 September 2018. She was caught in crossfire as she accompanied her 11 year old niece (daughter in some reports) to collect her school report. As one report explained

‘The fatal shooting was believed to be part of an ongoing war between rival gangs, who were importing Cape Town hitmen to do their killing. "They use the local guys to point out who they want killed," said a police officer, who wished to remain anonymous. At stake was a lucrative drug trade that includes Cat, cheap heroin, crack cocaine and pure cocaine.’

Protests flared up the day after Petersen's killing, with protestors vowing ‘to shut down the area to mourn her death and [they] called on government to deploy the army to clean up the drug-ridden area’. Police fired rubber bullets at protestors, injuring one. The protests continued for several days, with protestors blocking roads and torching a bus station.

On 2 October 2018, police minister Bheki Cele visited Westbury to engage with residents. On 4 October 2018 he launched a ‘tactical task team’ to investigate. On 5 October police arrested eight people for suspected gang-related crimes. On 10 October, two Sophiatown police officers were arrested on suspicion a corrupt relationship with criminals. On 14 October 2018 a man was arrested in the case of Heather Petersen's murder.

Prominent gangs in the area - the Fast Guns and Varados - have a significant influence on everyday life. In the context of material deprivation, gangs provide opportunities and services to people such as ‘loans, paying for funerals, providing food and other welfare’. Meanwhile, turf wars had resulted in ‘36 gang-related deaths in the past financial year and 33 in the current financial year’ according to the police minister, Bheki Cele speaking in October 2018. Some estimates are higher; one activist, also speaking in October 2018, said that 900 people had been killed since 2014. According to experts, the capacity of police to investigate gangs had been diminished as a result of restructuring.

Party politics and racial identity shaped accounts of the situation. Some residents expressed the view that the government discriminates against, and has abandoned, coloureds.

== Notable people ==
- Steven Pienaar - Everton F.C. player in the English Premier League & South Africa national football team player
- Ryan De Jongh - footballer
- Keagan Dolly - South African footballer
