= Xabiso Vili =

South African poet

Xabiso Vili is a South African poet, new media artist, author, and speaker who has performed his poetry nationally and internationally. He earned the title of World Slam Poetry Champion in Brussels in 2022. He is also noted for his poetry, which has been published in various anthologies, and his interactive multi-media projects. Owing to the work he has done in the arts sector of South Africa, he was named one of the Mail & Guardian 200 Young South Africans in 2022.

== Biography ==
Vili spent his early childhood in a rural area in the Eastern Cape, South Africa, although he has also lived in Pretoria and Cape Town, South Africa. His first poems were composed at the age of 12. Throughout his high-school career, he continued writing poems, some of which were published in English Alive, an annual anthology that showcases the work of South African high-school students. In 2008, he was elected head boy at Cedar House School in Cape Town. After completing his secondary education, he studied at Rhodes University for three years and worked as an assistant teacher at Cedar House School for a year, but soon moved back to Pretoria. He has also embarked on postgraduate studies in applied theatre at the University of the Witwatersrand.

== Performance ==
In 2015, Vili was named the champion of the inaugural Tshwane Speak Out Loud youth poetry competition. As one of the top 5 finalists, Vili travelled to Washington DC, USA the following year to perform his poetry during the Split This Rock Poetry Festival.

In 2017, Vili embarked on a 6-week of tour of India. During this time, he performed "Black Boi Be", a piece which Vili himself has described as "a combination of poems that come from personal stories".

In 2022, Vili was one of 40 poets from 37 countries who gathered in Brussels to compete for the title of World Slam Poetry Champion. For the final round of the competition, he performed a poem titled "Forget How to Die".

== Other activities ==
Vili is a new media artist who works with augmented and virtual reality, because of the ways in which it allows for creative forms of storytelling. To continue his work in these fields, he has been awarded multiple grants. The first notable grant was awarded in 2019 by Digital Lab Africa in the Web Creation category, for Vili's interactive project titled Re/Member Your Descendants. This project combines oral interviews, works of poetry, and art in a fusing of genres. He was also awarded the 2022 Future Africa grant by Meta as part of the Future Africa: Telling Stories, Building Worlds programme. Vili's Black Boi meets Boogeyman, an interactive 360° visual album, formed part of an XR (Extended Reality) exhibition showcasing the works of Meta's Future Africa grant recipients.

== Awards and honours ==
- 2015: Tshwane Speak Out Loud Champion
- 2019: Digital Lab Africa Web Creation award
- 2022: Future Africa grant recipient
- 2022: New Generations Featured Poet at Poetry Africa festival
- 2022: World Slam Poetry Champion

== Publications ==
- 2017: The poems "They Make the Music" and "Brass" were published in To Breathe into Another Voice: a South African anthology of jazz poetry.
- 2020: The poems "A book of dead black boys" and "Carving a Goddess (out of your mother)" were published in Yesterdays and Imagining Realities: an anthology of South African poetry.
