= This Day (South Africa) =

Defunct South African newspaper

This Day was a short-lived South African newspaper launched on 7 October 2003 by Nduka Obaigbena as a sister publication to This Day in Nigeria.

Justice Malala was the founding editor, having resigned his position as the Sunday Times' New York correspondent to take up the role. The paper was in broadsheet format, had a conservative editorial stance, and seen as a quality daily in the local journalism community.

However, at a time traditional advertising spend on newspapers was shrinking, the paper struggled financially almost from the get-go. Its financial position was worsened by the purchase of 71 CNA stores, ostensibly as the distribution wheel. The stores were the failed ones of the group, the successful stores already having been purchased by EDCON. On 25 October 2004, after that day's issue failed to appear, media reports circulated that ThisDay was fighting to secure new financial backers to ward off creditors. It folded shortly thereafter, although the Nigerian edition remains one of that country's largest newspapers.
