= Melba Johnson Kgositsile =

American activist (1940–1994)

Melba Johnson Kgositsile (1940–1994) was an American civil rights activist. She spent much of her life in New York City, where she was the executive director of the Council on Interracial Books for Children. She was also a vocal critic of apartheid and a supporter of the African National Congress.
