= Apples and Snakes =

British performance poetry organisation

- Formation: 1982. An England-wide organisation since 2002
- Type: culture and arts
- Legal status: registered charity
- Purpose: To stretch the boundaries of poetry in education and performance, by inspiring participation and giving voice to a diverse range of dynamic spoken word artists
- Headquarters: The Albany, Douglas Way, London SE8 4AG
- Region served: England
- Joint Directors: Lisa Mead and Robert Saunders
- Budget: £830,896
- Staff: 14 nationally
- Website: applesandsnakes.org

Apples and Snakes, based at the Albany Theatre in Deptford, south-east London, is an organisation for performance poetry and the spoken word in England. It has been described as the main organisation promoting performance poetry in Britain. Set up in 1982 by a group of poets, the organisation has been "the development ground for many high profile poets and spoken word artists" and others, including John Agard, Jean "Binta" Breeze, Malika Booker, Billy Bragg, Charlie Dark, Inua Ellams, Phill Jupitus, Lemn Sissay, Kae Tempest, Mike Myers, Toby Jones and many more.

Run by a board of trustees chaired by Kerry Featherstone, Apples and Snakes has been a registered charity since 1986. It currently receives more than £400,000 funding annually, as a national portfolio organisation, from Arts Council England.

== History ==
Apples and Snakes was launched in 1982, with its first poetry performance, at the Adam's Arms pub in Conway Street in central London. It is currently one of the organisations resident at the Free Word Centre.

In 1984, it organised a poetry performance at Glastonbury Festival and at Elephant Fayre, Cornwall. A Miner’s Benefit concert was organised at the Purcell Room, Southbank Centre, the same year. An Anti-Apartheid benefit was organised at the Southbank in 1985. In 2001, it organised a performance poetry event on London Buses. In 2013, it organised a series of events for young poets on climate change. In conjunction with the National Portrait Gallery and the National Literacy Trust, it organised a series of poetry events designed to complement Picture the Poet, a photographic exhibition that was displayed at the National Portrait Gallery and, in autumn 2014, at Sheffield's Graves Art Gallery.

== Publications ==
- Apples & Snakes: Raw and Biting Cabaret Poetry published 1984 by Pluto Press, design by Neville Brady. Second edition published 1987.
- Paul Beasley (editor). The Popular Front of Contemporary Poetry: Anthology, Apples and Snakes, 1992. ISBN 0951888102, ISBN 9780951888100, 239 pp. Published to celebrate Apples and Snakes' 10th anniversary.

In 1993, Black Spring Press published Velocity: The Best of Apples & Snakes, an anthology of works by contemporary poets who had performed for Apples and Snakes.
