= 2026 in hip-hop =

This article summarizes the events, album releases, and album release dates in hip-hop for the year 2026.

== Events ==
=== January ===
- On January 1, ZeeTheWizard was shot in Dallas, Texas. He died on January 5.
- On January 4, Calbo died at the age of 52.
- On January 7, the death of James Bernard was announced.
- On January 8, Fetty Wap was released from prison.
- On January 12, John Forté died at the age of 50.
- On January 21, the death of DJ Mike T was announced.

=== February ===
- On February 1, the 68th Annual Grammy Awards were held. Kendrick Lamar and SZA won Record of the Year and Best Melodic Rap Performance for "Luther". Clipse and Lamar won Best Rap Performance for "Chains & Whips". Lamar and Lefty Gunplay won Best Rap Song for "TV Off". Lamar won Best Rap Album for GNX. Mad Skillz won Best Spoken Word Poetry Album for Words for Days Vol. 1. Tyler, the Creator won Best Album Cover for Chromakopia. Pharrell Williams received the Dr. Dre Global Impact Award.
- On February 11, All Eyez on Me by Tupac Shakur and "Paid in Full" by Eric B. & Rakim were inducted into the Grammy Hall of Fame.
- On February 12, Milkman died at the age of 36.
- On February 18, Lil Poppa died at the age of 25 from suicide by gunshot.
- On February 22, Luci4 died at the age of 23.
- On February 23, Oliver "Power" Grant died at the age of 55.
- On February 28, the 57th NAACP Image Awards were held. Salt-N-Pepa and DJ Spinderella won the Hall of Fame Award. The Apple Music Super Bowl LIX Halftime Show with Kendrick Lamar won Outstanding Short-Form Series or Special - Reality/Nonfiction/Documentary. Kendrick Lamar and SZA won Outstanding Music Video/Visual Album for "Luther". Lamar won Outstanding Male Artist. Cardi B won Outstanding Album for Am I the Drama?, Outstanding Hip Hop/Rap Song for "ErrTime", and Outstanding Female Artist. Monaleo won Outstanding New Artist. On the same day, the Brit Awards 2026 were held. Dave won Best Hip Hop/Grime/Rap Act.

=== March ===
- On March 1, Bob Power died at the age of 73. On the same day, the intersection of Slauson Avenue and Crenshaw Boulevard in Los Angeles was named Nipsey Hussle Square.
- On March 8, Dot Rotten died at the age of 37.
- On March 12, Lord Sear died at the age of 53.
- On March 26, the MOBO Awards 2026 were held. Jim Legxacy won Best Male Act. Central Cee won Best Hip-hop Act, Chip won Best Grime Act, Twin S won Best Drill Act, and P2J won Best Producer. On the same day, the 2026 iHeartRadio Music Awards were held. Kendrick Lamar and SZA won Hip-Hop Song of the Year for "Luther". Kendrick Lamar won Hip-Hop Album of the Year for GNX and Hip-Hop Artist of the Year. Real Boston Richey won Best New Hip-Hop Artist. Ludacris received the iHeartRadio Landmark Award.

=== April ===
- On April 2, nine people, including Pooh Shiesty and Big30, were arrested in Memphis, Tennessee for allegedly robbing and kidnapping multiple men, one of which was Gucci Mane.
- On April 6, Offset was shot in Hollywood, Florida.
- On April 7, Blondy of The Sequence died at the age of 67.
- On April 9, Afrika Bambaataa died at the age of 68.
- On April 23, HavinMotion was shot and killed in Washington, D.C. at the age of 22.
- On April 28, Cleetis Mack of Digital Underground died.

=== May ===
- On May 8, Isaiah Chance, Davion Murphy, Rashad Murphy, and Sean Gathwright were found guilty for the murder of Julio Foolio.
- On May 15, Corneilus Smith was sentenced to 20 years in prison for the murder of Young Dolph.
- On May 22, Rob Base died at the age of 59.
- On May 25, the American Music Awards of 2026 were held. Kendrick Lamar won Best Male Hip-Hop Artist. Cardi B won Best Hip-Hop Song for "ErrTime", Best Hip-Hop Album for Am I the Drama?, and Best Female Hip-Hop Artist. Monaleo won Breakthrough Hip-Hop Artist.

=== June ===
- On June 1, Ludacris and Organized Noize were inducted into the Black Music & Entertainment Walk of Fame.
- On June 12, the intersection of School and Brook Streets in Yonkers, New York was named Earl 'DMX' Simmons Way.
- On June 13, the intersection of Grumman Avenue and Elizabeth Avenue in Newark, New Jersey was named Faith Evans Way.
- On June 16, Mystikal was sentenced to 20 years in prison.
- On June 18, Tay Keith was found dead in his apartment in Nashville, Tennessee at the age of 29.
- On June 24, XXL released their 2026 Freshman Class, including Chris Patrick, Belly Gang Kushington, Slayr, La Reezy, Trim, Trap Dickey, Babyfxce E, Hurricane Wisdom, YKNiece, Skrilla, Sosocamo, and Miles Minnick.
- On June 28, the BET Awards 2026 were held. Clipse won Album of the Year for Let God Sort Em Out, Best Group, and Best Collaboration for "Chains & Whips" with Kendrick Lamar. Lamar also won Best Male Hip Hop Artist. Cardi B won Best Female Hip Hop Artist. Lecrae won the Dr. Bobby Jones Best Gospel/Inspirational Award for "Headphones" with Killer Mike and T.I.. Doechii won the BET Her Award for "Girl, Get Up" with SZA. Lauryn Hill received the Living Legend Icon Award.

=== July ===
- On July 4, Sparky D died at the age of 61.
- On July 8, Bone Thugs-n-Harmony received a Hollywood Walk of Fame star.
- On July 16, Desiigner was arrested in South Carolina on a charge for domestic violence.

=== August ===
- On August 10, the trial began for Duane "Keffe D" Davis for his alleged involvement in the murder of Tupac Shakur.
- On August 20, the Lil Durk murder-for-hire trial began.
- On August 31, Duane "Keffe D" Davis was found guilty for the murder of Tupac Shakur, being convicted of a single count of first-degree murder.

=== September ===
- On September 4, Kewon White was found guilty for the November 2020 murder of MO3.
- On September 11, Lil Durk was found not guilty in his murder-for-hire trial.
- On September 12, Tone Capone died at the age of 59.
- On September 13, BloodHound Q50 was shot and killed in Chicago at the age of 22.
- On September 14, Macklemore was removed from Ed Sheeran's Loop Tour after performing "Hind's Hall" and making pro-Palestinian statements on stage.
- On September 17, Sway died at the age of 44.

=== October ===
- On October 1, Rick Ross was arrested for battery in Miami Beach, Florida.
- On October 13, Duane "Keffe D" Davis was sentenced to 40 years to life in prison for the murder of Tupac Shakur.

=== November ===
- On November 11, Yella Beezy was found guilty of the capital murder of MO3.
- On November 14, Wu-Tang Clan will be inducted into the Rock & Roll Hall of Fame.

== Released albums ==
=== January ===
Day	Artist(s)	Album	Record label(s)	Entering chart position
1	Treach	Lyrical Miracle Mixtape	Self-released	
2	Calboy	Wildboy 2	Self-released	
2	G Perico	Hard Reset	Empire	
5	Joohoney	光 (Insanity)	Starship	
9	Fashawn & Sir Veterano	All Hail the King 2	Fresh Yard	
9	Guè & Cookin' Soul	Fast Life 5	Island, Oyster, Universal	
9	Max B & French Montana	Coke Wave 3.5: Narcos	Defiant	
9	Tha God Fahim & Nicholas Craven	Ultimate Dump Gawd 2	Self-released	
9	The Kid Laroi	Before I Forget	Loma Vista	Debuted at No. 2 on the ARIA Albums Chart; Debuted at No. 6 on the Billboard 200
9	UnoTheActivist	Adventure Time 2	Omega, DVMN, Cleoptra	
9	Yung Bleu	Therapy	Moon Boy, Stem	
11	Nef the Pharaoh	ChangSzn 4	KILFMB	
14	Evilgiane	Giane 2	Surf Gang, Decent	
16	Aliyah's Interlude	Kuntology 101	Self-released	
16	A$AP Rocky	Don't Be Dumb	A$AP Rocky Recordings, RCA	Debuted at No. 1 on the Billboard 200
16	Bigbabygucci	Serotonin	Better Temperatures, ONErpm	
16	Dee Mula	Suffering From Success	NLess, Island	
16	Dina Ayada	Identity	Listen to the Kids, Santa Anna	
16	Lexa Gates	I Am	48 Lights, GoodTalk, UMG	
16	NSG	Sounds Of The Diaspora	Self-released	
16	Raf Saperra	Venomz Vol. II	Mass Appeal, Fatboy	
16	Wiz Khalifa	Khaotic	Taylor Gang	
16	YoungBoy Never Broke Again	Slime Cry	Never Broke Again, Motown	Debuted at No. 6 on the Billboard 200
20	Hardrock	Off the Planet	Victor Victor	
20	Jace!	Demons 3	Self-released	
21	ST6 JodyBoof	Strike Club	Santa Anna	
23	42 Dugg	Part 3	4PF, CMG, Interscope	
23	Bushy B	Lifestyle	Planet Blue, Empire	
23	Curren$y	Everywhere You Look	Jet Life	
23	DJ Harrison	ElectroSoul	Stones Throw	
23	IDK	E.T.D.S.	Broke	
23	Roc Marciano	656	Pimpire	
23	Uzi	Mortal Kombat	Sound of Street	
23	Wizkid & Asake	Real, Vol. 1	Starboy, Giran, Empire	
27	The Alchemist & Budgie	The Good Book III	ALC Records	
28	1900Rugrat	Free(Style) Game	Remain Solid, 300	
29	Fakemink	The Boy Who Cried Terrified	EtnaVeraVela	
30	By Storm	My Ghosts Go Ghost	DeadAir	
30	DaBaby	Be More Grateful	South Coast Music Group, Interscope	Debuted at No. 25 on the Billboard 200
30	Don Toliver	Octane	Cactus Jack, Donnway & Co, Atlantic	Debuted at No. 1 on the Billboard 200
30	E.D.I. Mean	The Realest Shit I Ever Wrote	O4L Digital	
30	Jordan Ward	Backward	Artium, Interscope	
30	Lord Jah-Monte Ogbon	As of Now	Lex	
30	Nafe Smallz	It's Not You, It's Me	Ozone	
30	Philthy Rich	T$GO	FOD Ent	
30	The Game, DJ Drama & Mike & Keys	Every Movie Needs a Trailer: The Credits	Numinati, FTS	
30	Wiz Khalifa	Moses The Black Soundtrack	Taylor Gang	
30	Xaviersobased	Xavier	1-chance, Surf Gang, Atlantic	

=== February ===
Day	Artist(s)	Album	Record label(s)	Entering chart position
6	1 Umbrella	1 Umbrella	Empire	
6	Hunxho	Not One Of Them	300	
6	J. Cole	The Fall-Off	Dreamville, Interscope	Debuted at No. 1 on the Billboard 200
6	Joji	Piss in the Wind	Palace Creek, Virgin	Debuted at No. 5 on the Billboard 200
6	RZA & Juice Crew	Bobby Digital Presents: Juice Crew All Stars	36 Chambers, DNA	
11	Sk8star	Designer Junkie	W4th, Island	
12	Ransom, Boldy James & Nicholas Craven	Salvation for the Wicked	Momentum	
13	A Boogie wit da Hoodie	Before Artistry	Atlantic, Highbridge	
13	Brevin Kim	Boyband	Teamsesh, Empire	
13	Buddah Bless	Buddah Bless The Streets	B.U, Human Re Sources	
13	Crimeapple & Evidence	War Cash	Bigger Picture	
13	Feng	Weekend Rockstar	Regularisperfect	
13	Killah Priest & Chief Kamachi	Beautiful Minds	Good Hands	
13	Ledbyher	The Elephant	Island	
13	Marco Polo	The Many Moods of Marco Polo, Vol. 1	Franks Drum Set	
13	Ras Kass	Leopard Eats Face	Soulspazm	
13	Waka Flocka Flame	LeBron Flocka James 2K26	Brick Squad Monopoly, Organic Music	
14	Daz Dillinger	Valentine's Day: The Album	Daz Dillinger Recordingz	
14	Z-Ro	Never Love a B*tch Again	One Deep, SoSouth	
18	Robb Banks	Rich Badne$$	430	
20	Baby Keem	Casino	PGLang, Columbia	Debuted at No. 4 on the Billboard 200
20	Babyfxce E	Da Realest	Atlantic	
20	Dave East & Scram Jones	For the Love 2	FTD, Beast	
20	E.D.I. Mean & H-Ryda	This Thing of Ours	OFL Digital	
20	Larry June, Curren$y & The Alchemist	Spiral Staircases	The Freeminded, Jet Life, ALC	
20	Mozzy & EST Gee	Not A Chance In Hell	Young Shiners, Empire	
20	OMB Peezy	Better and Better	Overkill, Hitmaker	
20	Skaiwater	Wonderful	GoodTalk	
20	SleazyWorld Go	I Want Blood	Island	
24	Mick Jenkins & GreenSllime	Black Ass Kung Fu Flick	Self-released	
26	Foggieraw	With No Due Respect	Mercury	
27	BabyTron	Out On Bond Again	The Hip Hop Lab, Empire	
27	Boldy James & Rome Streetz	Manhunt	1301, New 11, Mass Appeal	
27	Bones	SongsToSleepTo	TeamSesh, Empire	
27	Chase B	Be Very Afraid Vol. 1	Self-released	
27	Concrete Boys	It's Us Vol. 2	Concrete Rekordz, Quality Control	
27	DC the Don	The Rumors Are True	Letter 5, Republic	
27	Gorillaz	The Mountain	Kong	Debuted at No. 1 on the UK Albums Chart; Debuted at No. 7 on the Billboard 200
27	RJD2 & Supastition	According To...	Eavesdrop	
27	Sosocamo	Big Country	Broke	
27	Tobi Lou	Crazy Boots <3	Free Agency	
27	Wiz Khalifa	Girls Love Horses	Taylor Gang	
28	Quelle Chris	Happy Place	Self-released	

=== March ===
Day	Artist(s)	Album	Record label(s)	Entering chart position
1	Boosie Badazz & Poison Ivi	Iviona & Pops	Badazz Syndicate	
1	LaRussell & Lil Jon	Something's in the Water	Good Compenny	
4	Zephrxd	After All That, I'm Still Here	Novagang	
6	Denzel Curry & The Scythe	Strictly 4 the Scythe	PH, Loma Vista	
6	DJ Paul	Goat of All Goats	Scale-A-Ton	
6	Flying Lotus	Big Mama	Brainfeeder	
6	Franglish	Love & Sugar	Lutèce, AllPoints	
6	Fredo Bang	Most Hated 2	Empire	
6	Ghais Guevara	Goyard & The Kayfabe Reveal	DotWavNotWave	
6	Gnarls Barkley	Atlanta	Loma Vista	
6	Joey Cool	Time Will Tell	Strange Music, Virgin	
6	Litty	Get Litty?	Empire	
6	Nettspend	Early Life Crisis	Grade A Productions, Interscope	Debuted at No. 39 on the Billboard 200
6	Paul Russell	Miracle Mile	Arista	
6	Shabaka	Of The Earth	Self-released	
6	Strick	Machine On	Crown & Sword	
6	Trae tha Truth	Farewell	Self-released	
6	Ty Dolla Sign	Girl Music Vol. 1	Atlantic	
10	Aesop Rock & Homeboy Sandman	Miami Lice: Season Four	Rhymesayers	
11	Cities Aviv	Even Colder Spring	Dot	
12	Nas	Feature Presentation 2025	Mass Appeal	
12	OG Ron C, Benny the Butcher & Black Soprano Family	Big Slow Fest	Black Soprano Family	
12	P1Harmony	Unique	FNC Entertainment	Debuted at No. 4 on the Billboard 200
13	Billi0n	Revenge	10K Projects	
13	Bruiser Wolf & Sheefy McFly	Push & Paint	Fake Shore Drive, Sheefy	
13	Duwap Kaine	Tha Godfather	Self-released	
13	Elucid & Sebb Bash	I Guess U Had to Be There	Backwoodz	
13	Jack Harlow	Monica	Atlantic	Debuted at No. 40 on the Billboard 200
13	Killowen	Addicted To Nostalgia	Isekai, Broke	
13	Kim Gordon	Play Me	Matador	
13	Mickey Factz	The Plague	Self-released	
13	Ms Banks	South LDN Lover Girl	Believe	
13	Smoke DZA, The Musalini & John Dutch	Uptown Saturday Night	DMG	
13	Starlito & Bandplay	Not the Country You Know: Unhappy Hour	Grind Hard, Street Orchestra, Empire	
13	Starlito & Bandplay	Not the Country You Know: Last Call	Grind Hard, Street Orchestra, Empire	
13	Tom MacDonald	Declassified	Self-released	
13	UnityTX	Somewhere, In Between...	Pure Noise	
16	Your Boy Posca & Boldy James	Hook, Line & Sinker	Nancy's Records	
17	Lil' Flip	La Clover Nostra III: I Trust Me	Clover G, GT Digital	
19	Ca7riel & Paco Amoroso	Free Spirits	5020	
19	Lebra Jolie	Better Than Yesterday	Interscope	
20	Bigbabygucci	Tha_Leak	ONErpm	
20	BigXthaPlug, Ro$ama, Yung Hood & MurdaGang PB	6WA	600	Debuted at No. 118 on the Billboard 200
20	BTS	Arirang	Big Hit	Debuted at No. 1 on the Billboard 200
20	Lil' Keke	Streets Is My Witness	Slfmade 713	
20	Mike Will Made It	R3set	EarDrummers	Debuted at No. 172 on the Billboard 200
20	Samara Cyn	Detour	Vanta	
25	El Bogueto	Eso Si Es De Gangster	No Hay Loco Que No Corone	
25	Kota the Friend	Local Art Dealer, Vol. 1	Fltbys	
25	Pradabagshawty	5 Problems	Cegular, Santa Anna	
27	Central Cee	All Roads Lead Home	Columbia	Debuted at No. 34 on the UK Albums Chart
27	Chief Keef	Skeletor	43B	
27	Dälek	Brilliance of a Falling Moon	Ipecac	
27	Fetty Wap	Zavier	RGF, 300	Debuted at No. 169 on the Billboard 200
27	Fivio Foreign	Still Standing	Fivi Affairs	
27	Jozzy	Soundtrack 2 Get Her Back	Dope By Accident, RBC, BMG	
27	Juvenile	Boiling Point	DNA, Hitmaker	
27	Nickelus F	The Undisputed	Trick Dice	
27	Yeat	ADL	Lyfestyle Corporation, Field Trip, Capitol	Debuted at No. 5 on the Billboard 200
27	YGTUT	Sunset of the Titan Twilight	The House	
27	Yung Bleu	World At War	Broke Genius	
28	Kanye West	Bully	YZY, Gamma	Debuted at No. 2 on the Billboard 200
31	Joey Fatts	Group Chat This	Cutthroat	
31	Tony Shhnow	Flood	Stem	

=== April ===
Day	Artist(s)	Album	Record label(s)	Entering chart position
2	Lil Mariko	Slightly Unhinged	Bad	
2	Marlon Craft	The Internet Killed the Neighborhood	Soulspazm, Homecourt	
2	Miles Minnick	Somersville	Glo, Empire	
2	Saul & Hasan	Od Nekonečna Do Dávna	Milion Plus, Virgin	
2	Wiz Khalifa & Curren$y	Roofless Records for Drop Tops (Disc 1)	Taylor Gang	
3	41	Area 41	RiteOrWrongKVH, Republic	
3	Bbymutha	Rent Due	Self-released	
3	C Stunna	Born To Stunt	Bag Talk, MNRK	
3	Codefendants	Lifers	This Is Crime Wave, Regime	
3	Coyote & Statik Selektah	Machetes & Micheladas	Self-released	
3	Dave East	EastMix Vol. 3	FTD	
3	Juicy J & DJ Scream	The Trippy Tapes Vol. 1	Trippy, Stem	
3	Lipphead (Blockhead & Eliot Lipp)	The Long Way	Def Pressé	
3	Mike, Earl Sweatshirt & Surf Gang	Pompeii // Utility	Tan Cressida, 10k, Surf Gang, The Harp	
3	Nine Vicious	Emotions	Studio Addicts, Create	Debuted at No. 102 on the Billboard 200
3	Nino Breeze	Omertá	MMG, Gamma.	
3	R2R Moe	The Greatest Show On Earth	Create	
3	Rexx Life Raj & Reecebeats	4 the Love	Empire	
3	Slump6s	Mayhem	Self-released	
3	Swae Lee	Same Difference	Eardruma, Interscope	
3	Tory Lanez	LOL: Slutty Bass	PRSL	
3	Yung Kayo	Komodo	Self-released	
5	Jace!	Flowers Die on Sunday	Slang	
8	Hulvey	Could Be Tonight	Reach	
8	Money Man	Break The Rules Or Stay Broke	Black Circle, Empire	
10	BossMan Dlow	Chicken Talkin Bastard	Alamo	Debuted at No. 42 on the Billboard 200
10	Buddy	Simmie Sims III	Independent Co.	
10	Gashi & Jimi Banks	The Killah Whales Of Gotham 2	Orca Sound	
10	Grems	Trapjazz	Eveno Michaël	
10	JasonMartin & DJ Flippp	Quik Flip	50 Million, OTR	
10	Millkzy	Floetry The Extension	Broke	
10	Serial Killers (Xzibit, B-Real & Demrick)	This Thing of Ours	Ineffable	
10	Snoop Dogg	10 Til' Midnight	Death Row, Gamma	
10	Soulja Boy	Drip	SODMG	
10	T.F. & DJ Muggs	Don't Call Me Lucky	Self-released	
10	Wesley Joseph	Forever Ends Someday	Secretly Canadian	
13	Tony Yayo	The 4:20 Tape	Talk of New York	
14	Yhapojj	Dear Rap	Self-released	
15	King Promise & Mr Eazi	See What We've Done	emPawa	
15	Sexyy Red	Yo Favorite Trappa Favorite Rappa	Rebel, Gamma	
16	Riz Ahmed & various artists	Bait: Music From and Inspired by the Original Series	FAMM, Amazon	
17	Adrian Younge	Younge	Linear Labs	
17	Fat Trel	City of God	Self-released	
17	KhakiKid	Girl Bites Dog	10K Projects	
17	Kuru	Backstage Hologram	DeadAir	
17	M.I.A.	M.I.7	Ohmnimusic	
17	Mike Shabb	Hood Olympics 2	Blk	
17	Narcy	To Be An (Arab)	We Are The Medium	
17	Natural Elements	Alignment	Ne4Lifent	
17	Red Café	Once in a Red Moon	Shakedown	
17	Squadda B	Evolver	Bruiser Brigade	
17	Tezzus & Diamond*	UY Scuti Bøyz	Young Stoner Life	
17	Tokischa	Amor & Droga	SOL, Warner Latina	
18	Dope (Chuck D & John Densmore)	No Country For Old Men	Org	
20	B-Legit	Hemp Hop, Vol. 1	Block	
20	BandGang Lonnie Bands & Cornfed Ted	Medicinal Use Only	Antimedia, Create	
20	Blu & Exile	Time Heals Everything	Dirty Science	
20	Daz Dillinger	Mo' Weed 4 Sale	Self-released	
20	Lil' Flip & Dr. Za	Medicinal Music	Clover G, GT	
21	Wallie the Sensei	Madd Dogg: The Mixtape, Vol. 1	Cactus Jack	
22	Benny the Butcher & Black Soprano Family	Ashes In The Safe	Black Soprano Family	
22	EthoSuave	Q2	Create	
22	Myaap	Pixie Dust	Self-released	
22	Sir Michael Rocks	Rocks Paper Scissors: Choices	Marriani, Fake Shore Drive	
24	Billy Danze	The Answer	WeBusy	
24	Cadence Weapon	Forager	Wholly Roland Empire, Six Shooter	
24	Deko	FL Mixtape	DreamsOnline	
24	Fatboi Sharif & Child Actor	Crayola Circles	Backwoodz	
24	FCG Heem	Hood Bluez	New Era, 100k, Create	
24	Guvna B	This Bed I Made	Guvvy	
24	Montana 700	Sadetra Son	Remain Solid, 300	
24	Nems & Ron Browz	I Should Boom You	Gorilla, Etherboy	
24	Reason	Moving Towards Love_Pink	Do More, 195 Oak	
24	Rosco P. Coldchain & Nicholas Craven	Play With Something Safe	Unshackled	
24	Sada Baby	Lost Tapes 3	Big Squad, Organic	
24	Shordie Shordie	More Than Music 3	Trippers, Empire	
24	Trueno	Turr4zo	Sony US Latin	
24	Warhol.SS & B6	I Can't Feel My Face	FRVR	
28	Curren$y, Wiz Khalifa & Harry Fraud	Roofless Records for Drop Tops (Disc 2)	Srfschl, Taylor Gang, Jet Life	
29	Grafh	Sometimes Money Cost Too Much	Team Bang Dope Gang	
29	Jay Montana	Montana 3	10K Projects	
30	Nettspend	Him	Interscope	
30	Oddisee & Heno.	From Takoma With Love	Outer Note	

=== May ===
Day	Artist(s)	Album	Record label(s)	Entering chart position
1	Asake	M$ney	Giran, Empire	
1	Casper Sage	Patina	Free Lunch, Warner	
1	Edward Skeletrix	Body of Work	Self-released	
1	Eladio Carrión	Corsa	Rimas	Debuted at No. 138 on the Billboard 200
1	Isaiah Rashad	It's Been Awful	TDE, Warner	Debuted at No. 18 on the Billboard 200
1	Jay Worthy	Once Upon a Time: The Soundtrack	GDF, Empire	
1	Kneecap	Fenian	Heavenly	Debuted at No. 1 on the Irish Albums Chart
1	Lil Tjay	They Just Ain't You	TrenchKid	
1	Lil Tony & #RoyalPriesthood	Anointed!	Royal La Familia	
1	Luhh Dyl	A Time to Hurt, A Time to Heal (ATH^{2})	300	
1	PlaqueBoyMax	Crash Dummy	5Star, UMG	
1	Shoreline Mafia	Bidness is Boomin	Atlantic	
1	Skrilla	Z	Priority, UMG	
1	Trials	Hendle	Island Records Australia	Debuted at No. 24 on the ARIA Albums Chart
4	Cortis	GreenGreen	Big Hit	Debuted at No. 3 on the Billboard 200
6	Deante' Hitchcock	Junkie in the Sun	Do Better, 195 Oak	
7	Estee Nack & Cookin' Soul	Al-Andalus	Self-released	
7	Hitta Slim, Cousin Fik & E-40	The Assembly	Timeless Master, Sick Wid It	
8	Action Bronson	Planet Frog	Baklava Industries	
8	Adamn Killa	Influencer	Self-released	
8	AZ	Doe or Die III	Mass Appeal	
8	Bigbabygucci	Asleep at the Wheel	Onerpm	
8	Black Fortune	Road To Osshland: The Series	Epic	
8	Black Milk	Ceremonial	Computer Ugly	
8	Chris Brown	Brown	RCA Records	Debuted at No. 7 on the Billboard 200
8	Glaive & Kurtains	God Save the Three	Broke	
8	J Balvin & Ryan Castro	Omertà	Sueños Globales, UMG	
8	JWords	Sound Therapy	Sine Wave	
8	Kid Milli & Okashii	Mainstream	POV	
8	Lijpe	Rode Kaart	Top Notch, Universal	
8	Like	Today Sounds Good	Squatch	
8	Lil' Keke, Cal Wayne & AL-D*300,	Streets Is My Witness, Pt. 2	Slfmade 713	
8	Little Simz	Sugar Girl	AWAL	
8	Rels B	Love Love Flakk	Dale Play	
8	Taylor Bennett	Time After Youth (TAY)	Self-released	
8	Tayna	Genesis	360	
8	Thaiboy Digital & Swedm	Paradise	Decent	
8	Trap Dickey	The Ville	Top Dawg	
9	Lil Ghost	魁	Self-released	
12	414JungleBaby	Jungle This Jungle That	300	
12	Kenny Mason	Bulldawg	Atlantic	
12	Tobi Lou	Same Old Jeans (Ripped Jeans)	Free Agency	
15	Bnyx	Genesis-FM	Data Club, Lyfestyle, Field Trip, Capitol	
15	Chill Rob G	Survival of the Better	Spitslam	
15	Drake	Habibti	OVO Sound, Republic	Debuted at No. 2 on the Billboard 200
15	Drake	Iceman	OVO Sound, Republic	Debuted at No. 1 on the Billboard 200
15	Drake	Maid of Honour	OVO Sound, Republic	Debuted at No. 3 on the Billboard 200
15	Dua Saleh	Of Earth & Wires	Ghostly International	
15	Genesis Owusu	Redstar Wu & the Worldwide Scourge	Ourness	Debuted at No. 3 on the ARIA Albums Chart
15	Gera MX	X Amor al Arte	Sony México	
15	Ikkimel	Poppstar	Four, Sony	
15	Inspectah Deck & Chetta Bang	Inspectah Deck Vs. Chedda Bang	Black Stone of Mecca	
15	Jul	Oubliez-moi	D'Or et de Platine, Believe	
15	Lil Shine	Get Rich or Die Sippin'	Self-released	
15	Lord Sko & Statik Selektah	Elevator Music	Uptown Sh!t, Stimulated	
15	Lucki	Dr*gs R Bad	Empire	Debuted at No. 9 on the Billboard 200
15	Maluma	Loco x Volver	Sony Music Latin	
15	Nappy Nina & Swarvy	Sow & Go	Lucid Haus	
15	Nick Grant	Smile	195 Oak	
15	Nutso Thugn & Cardo	Voice of the Klan	MadHouse, Apeklan	
15	Os Garotin	Força da juventude	Labrights	
15	Pigeons & Planes	See You Next Year 3	Big.Ass.Kids, Good Boy	
15	ProfJam	LSD (Love Songs Die)	Mario Cotrim, Universal Portugal, Virgin Portugal	
15	Quando Rondo	Until I Return	Self-released	
15	Simon Dominic	Onyx	Self-released	
15	SonReal	Honest Work	Self-released	
15	Vic Spencer	Inspire Your Idols	Old Fart Luggage	
15	Willie Peyote	Anatomia di uno schianto prolungato	Turet, Universal Italia	
16	Mata	#Mata2040	¸¸♬·¯·♩¸¸♪·¯·♫¸¸♫·¯·♪	
18	Taeyong	Wyld	SM	
19	Lelo	Mastiff: Pink Tiles	10K	
20	Bladee	Sulfur Surfer	Trash Island	
20	Nucci	Dve barbike	Generacija Zed	
20	Samurai Jay	Amatore	Island	
21	JPEGMafia	Experimental Rap	AWAL	
21	Neutro Shorty	El disco de Salsa	Rimas	
22	6lack	Love Is the New Gangsta	LVRN, Interscope	Debuted at No. 154 on the Billboard 200
22	Aja Monet	The Color of the Rain	Drink Sum Wtr	
22	Álvaro Díaz	Omakase	Universal Latino	
22	Big Sad 1900	Colored by emotion	Empire	
22	Cheema Y & Gur Sidhu	Bermuda Triangle	Brown Town	
22	Dizzy DROS	Aflam	Self-released	
22	Don Trip & Eddie Valero	Armageddon	Jedd	
22	Fakemink	Terrified	EtnaVeraVela	Debuted at No. 90 on the ARIA Charts
22	French Montana & Max B	Wave Gods 2: Cosmo Brothers	Coke Boys	
22	MGK & Wiz Khalifa	Blog Era Boyz	Est 19xx, Interscope	
22	NSG	Sounds of the Diaspora 2	Self-released	
22	RJmrLA	Mr. LA II	Ommio, Empire	
22	Stormy	Desperado	Austora	
22	Tedua	Ryan Ted	Epic	
22	Veeze	Y'all Won	Navy Wavy, Warner	
28	Omar Camacho	Nunca Voy a Morir	Rico o Muerto by Baja Sound, Warner Music México	
29	38 Spesh	8 Shots	TCF Music Group	
29	9th Wonder, Jada & S14th	The Zenith	Jamla, Fat Beats	
29	Aespa	Lemonade	SM, Kakao	Debuted at No. 9 on the Billboard 200
29	ALLBLACK & Juice Lee	If 16 Was a Letter	Juice Division, Play Runners Association	
29	Anderson .Paak	K-Pops!	Capitol	
29	Ironik	Nostalgia	RU Listening	
29	K Camp & Zaytoven	Giant	Rare Sound	
29	Labrinth	Cosmic Opera: Act II	Columbia	
29	Latto	Big Mama	RCA, Streamcut	Debuted at No. 16 on the Billboard 200
29	Lil Pete	Real is Back	Empire	
29	Moka Only	Many Pies	Urbnet	
29	Monday Night & Evidence	Football	Bigger Picture	
29	Peewee Longway	Indo	MPA, Empire	
29	Peysoh	BastardChild	Empire	
29	Pouya	Foreverglades	Empire	
29	Pozer	Crossroads	Self-released	
29	R3 Da Chilliman	Bling Bling Boy 2	Create	
29	Reggie	Undra	Reginald Helms, RCA	
29	Reuben Aziz	Mind the Gap	Alamo	
29	Rucci	Norfside Story	Empire	
29	Savv4x	Foe Timez	10K Projects	
29	Scrim	Runaway	G59 Records	Debuted at No. 134 on the Billboard 200
29	Young Chris & MadeinTYO	Made in Philly	MNRK	
29	Young M.A	Kween	M.A Music, 3D	

=== June ===
Day	Artist(s)	Album	Record label(s)	Entering chart position
1	Mach-Hommy	5786 AM: Easy Listen	Self-released	
1	Shabaam Sahdeeq & Es-K	Outside the Lines	Marvial	
1	Smoke DZA	Road Trip to Amsterdam	RFC	
3	Kura	RiotRiotRiot	Self-released	
4	Thurz & 14kt	Thee Immaculate	Party In My Living Room, Karat Gold	
5	ApolloRed1	DemonHeartRadio	YVL, Interscope	
5	Artigeardit	Den lange vej	Universal Music Denmark	
5	Boi-1da & Canada Soccer	What If It All Goes Right?	Infinity &	
5	Bones	ETC.	TeamSesh, Empire	
5	Cold187um	Gangster And Elegant	West World	
5	ElGrandeToto	Salgoat Vol. 2	EGT, Sony France	
5	Eligh & Faze One	The Way The Light Looks	Self-released	
5	Harrison	Taking a walk and calling a car home	Surf Gang	
5	John Brown the Rapper & Da Beatminerz	Waxing In Mecca	Soulspazm	
5	KitschKrieg	KitschKrieg Zwei	SoulForce, Four, Sony	
5	Lee "Scratch" Perry	Spatial, No Problem.	Domino	
5	Lizzo	Bitch	Nice Life, Atlantic	
5	Luh Tyler	Destined For Greatness	Motion Music, Atlantic	
5	Navy Blue	Sir Render	Freedom Sounds	
5	Paul Wall	Fortune & Glory	Self-released	
5	Protect	Slimedude2003	Ball Hogs, Atlantic	
5	Scorcher	All Dorks Must Die	Lizzy	
5	The Artist Yahn Freeman & Jon Connor	5	All Varsity	
5	Various artists	Official FIFA World Cup 2026 Album	FIFA Sound	Debuted at No. 152 on the Billboard 200
5	Vince Staples	Cry Baby	Section Eight Arthouse, Loma Vista	Debuted at No. 73 on the Billboard 200
5	Vybz Kartel	God & Time	TJ	
5	Wax & DJ Hoppa	Highway Hotel	Ineffable	
5	Wu-Lu & Poison Anna	Bakerz Dozen	Warp	
6	$amaad & evilgiane	Idea of Evil	Self-released	
7	Serengeti	KennyV	CC King	
8	Duwap Kaine	Til' Infinity	Self-released	
8	Tezzus	The Resurrectiøn	Young Stoner Life	
9	Conway the Machine	I Heard You Paint Houses	Self-released	
10	BSG Rambo	Sincerely, Beezy	300	
10	Green Montana	Melancholia 4099	Warner France	
11	Bb trickz	Sugarhiii	Columbia	
11	Emperor Middi & Kool Keith	Middi Magazine	Self-released	
11	HeadHuncho Amir	All My Intentions Real	Only Sun, 300	
11	Kaaris	Byakugan	OG	
12	Ateyaba	Roi Scorpion	Esprit d'extase	
12	BabyChiefDoit	Rise Against My Broken Odds	Artist Partner Group	
12	Blxst	Labor of Love	Empire	
12	Dro Kenji	It Is What It Is	10K Projects	
12	Feid	El Moco Verde	Universal Latino, Grabaciones Los Poderosos	
12	French the Kid	Can't Kill Bill	Dropout	
12	Guy2Bezbar	Jeunesse Dorée Music	Blue Magic, Sony	
12	Hotboii	Kut Da Fan On 2	Rebel, Geffen	
12	Jim Jones	The Landlord	Hitmaker	
12	Kalash	Ex-Voto	Mwaka Moon, Play Two	
12	Kodak Black	Kodak the Blessing	Capitol, Vulture Love	Debuted at No. 176 on the Billboard 200
12	Mickey Diamond & Big Ghost	Blood of the Lamb	Big Ghost	
12	The Musalini	Summer Breeze	Jamla	
12	Wiki	Ancient History	Wikset	
12	Ycee	Out Of Sight – Out Of Mind (Vol. 1)	ANBT	
12	YN Jay	Gaffle Boy Jay	YN	
12	ZelooperZ & Black Noi$e	Pin Breakers	Self-released	
13	Hit-Boy	Hitstory 2: Success Is A Dirty Word	Self-released	
14	Ghais Guevara	Goyarchives, Lessons Before The Battle	Self-released	
17	Fimiguerrero	The Statue Of A Fool	Lizzy	
19	Aketo	Khalota	Sidi Fox	
19	Aziedoesntexist	Strings Attached	Runway, 10K Projects	
19	Blessd	El Peor Hombre del Mundo	Warner Latina	
19	Chillinit	Wisdom Weed & Wordplay	420 Family	Debuted at No. 5 on the ARIA Albums Chart
19	Cochise	Trench Town	Warriors	
19	D12	D12 Forever (Vol. 1)	My Brothers Keeper Entertainment	
19	Dice Raw	The Insanity Project	Raw Life, Soulspazm	
19	Evilgiane	#Heavensgate Vol. 2	Surf Gang	
19	Flyana Boss	Under the Influence	Broke	
19	Franglish & KeBlack	Energy	Lutèce, Mirage, AllPoints	
19	Fredo	Motion Sickness	Biordi	Debuted at No. 81 on the UK Albums Chart
19	Karencici	Loser.	Warner Taiwan	
19	Key Glock	Project X	Paper Route Empire, Republic	Debuted at No. 29 on the Billboard 200
19	M Huncho	The Wizard	MYB, 10K Projects	Debuted at No. 53 on the UK Albums Chart
19	Matt Proxy	Trojan Horse	Sana, Listen To The Kids	
19	Nicholas Craven & Boldy James	Trapper's Alley 3: Hell or High Water	Self-released	
19	Paloalto & Yosi	Mental Care	Modern Arts Society	
19	Ras Ceylon & Timbo King	Scrollz Of Lion Rock	1332, Still Decolonizing	
19	Roll Deep	Best in the Game	Fabriclive	
19	Rvfv	Éxitos España	Nastu	
19	Sha Ray & DJ Haram	Critical Thot	Backwoodz Studioz	
19	Tana	Me	SDL, Create	
19	The Alchemist	Liquid Form	Self-released	
19	Tierra Whack	Whack's Museum	Interscope	
19	YG	The Gentlemen's Club	4Hunnid, 10K Projects	
19	Zene the Zilla	Chorok: Mixtape	Ambition Musik	
20	Die Antwoord	Zama Zama	Zef	
20	Pz'	No Turning Back	Banjul	
22	Ruste Juxx & Sir Puff-A-Lot	World Renowned	Puffalot	
23	Phreshboyswag	Party boy	Self-released	
24	Lazer Dim 700	The Rules of Success	Fast Music	
26	1900Rugrat	Fireman	Remain Solid	
26	6ix	6ixcamp V1	Perfect Storm	
26	A-F-R-O & MotionPlus	Frequencies	Fro Thizzle, SoulFeed	
26	Afrob & Ferris MC	Ein Fall für Zwei	Capitol	
26	AG Club & Jody Fontaine	Thank You, Goodnight	Epic	
26	Andy Mineo & Wordsplayed	Magic & Bird 2: What a Rush!	Miner League	
26	Capella Grey	..Well Then.	Allepac the Family	
26	DJ Bandz & Only the Family	Lafamilia	Lafa, Empire	
26	Eslabón Armado	Nocturno	Armado	
26	FearDorian	Tease, Vol. 1	Self-released	
26	Finch	Aussenseiter Spitzenreiter	Zur Mucke, Columbia	
26	Hooligan Hefs	Sixth Sense	New Levels	
26	J French	I Don't Believe in Bad Days 2	Umbrella	
26	Jace!	Eat Shit	Slang	
26	Libretto & Theory Hazit	Bretto Bap!	Self-released	
26	Lil Double 0	Layin Da Walkdown B Side	Freebandz	
26	Maiya the Don	Precious Cargo	MNRK	
26	Maxo Kream	O.Y.N.	Empire	
26	Mello Buckzz	Pretty Opp	No More Heroes, Santa Anna	
26	MexikoDro	Stayed Down	Republic	
26	Mo Kolours & The Co-Operators	Fruits of the Diaspora	Self-released	
26	Nascar Aloe	Audio Shrapnel	Epitaph	
26	Pluto	Diary of a Young Lit B*tch	Motown	
26	Prof	Good Time Boy	Stophouse	
26	Quando Rondo	16 Months	Self-released	
26	Radamiz	Lightman, Alive	Sparta	
26	Rico Love	97 Bad Boy	D1MG	
26	Riff Raff	Neon Nighthawk	Castles of Chrome, Black 17	
26	Russ Millions	Perseverance	Aplco	
26	Tha God Fahim & Nicholas Craven	Dump Gawd: Hyperbolic Time Chamber Rap 3	Self-released	
26	The Doppelgangaz	Beats for Brothels, Vol. 9	Self-released	
26	T.I.	Kill the King	Grand Hustle, Empire Distribution	Debuted at No. 30 on the Billboard 200
26	Wrekonize & Mike Summers	Edited For Reality	Sunrise to Sunset	
26	Wyclef Jean	Clef Notes – Quantum Leap, Vol. 1	SodoMoodLab	
26	YoungBoy Never Broke Again	ML2	Never Broke Again, Motown	Debuted at No. 13 on the Billboard 200
30	Mike Shabb & Estee Nack	Live From The Tabernackle Vol. 2	#23IncredibleIndustries	

=== July ===
Day	Artist(s)	Album	Record label(s)	Entering chart position
3	Bonez MC	Johnny's Tape	Vertigo, Capitol	
3	Don Xhoni	100%	New Chicago	
3	Enphamus	No Biggie	ONErpm	
3	Fatoni	Drama endet nie	LOL, Sony	
3	Hubert.	Sie porobiło...	Def Jam	
3	Ken Carson	Xperiment	Opium, Interscope	Debuted at No. 7 on the Billboard 200
3	Layzie Bone	D.a.S.H	Harmony Howse	
3	Lil Bean	Yeah Bop!	Empire	
3	Mg Lil Bubba	Bubba Story	Create	
3	Nèg' Marrons	Nèg' Marrons	Evidence	
3	PS Hitsquad	Life On Licence	House Anxiety	
3	Rylo Rodriguez	S.K.A.T.E.	Motown	Debuted at No. 13 on the Billboard 200
3	$tupid Young	Welcome to Cambodia Town	Empire	
3	Tekno	Where Did Love Go?	emPawa Africa	
3	Tonio Armani & Lil Jon	Outside For The Summer	Death Row	
3	Toquel	10 (Part 2)	Minos EMI, Universal	
4	Lil' Flip	War Peace Family Faith	Clover G, GT Digital	
4	Philthy Rich	FOD: The New Death Row	FOD Ent	
6	Luci Gang	Rolling Stone	Bvcklash, YG Plus	
6	Lute	Hard to Reach	Slum County, Dreamville	
6	M-Dot	A Notebook With No Light	Soulchain	
6	RMR	Stick To The Script	Self-released	
7	Keith Ape	Here Comes the Pain!	Underwater	
7	La Reezy	Skiddle Bandana	United Masters	
8	Diamond*	Bling Slime Vøl 1	Hallwood, YSL	
9	YFG Fatso	Sanity Evaded	Santa Anna	
10	Anna	Million Dollar Babe	EMI	
10	Bfb Da Packman	God Blessing All The Fat Niggas 2	Lunch Crew Company	
10	Bizzy Crook	Underdogs Win Eventually	Ezmny, Create	
10	Black C	3x Ruthless	Rightway, AllnFallnDoe	
10	Buckshot	The Package	Duck Down	
10	Chuck Strangers	Glory of the King's Hand	Lex	
10	Conep	Trappii 2	Dynamic, Empire	
10	Fathers (Kenny Beats, Kiefer, Carrtoons & Nate Smith)	Fathers	Blue Note	
10	Future	The Real Me	Freebandz, Epic	Debuted at No. 1 on the Billboard 200
10	Hollowtiphero	First Round Pick	Warner	
10	Juicy J & Project Pat	Dem Goats	Trippy	
10	KB	This Cannot Be Sold	Provident	
10	Lance Skiiiwalker	#Invite,sessions,only!!	Top Dawg	
10	Luis R. Conriquez	Muchacho Alegre	K, Sony US Latin	
10	PFG & J. Cole	Never Say Die	The Sheltuh, Aspen	
10	Pyraboyz	Czech Hi-Tekk	Warner Czech Republic	
10	Raz Fresco	Why Equals Self	Self-released	
10	Sango	Rhythm & Melody	Mass Appeal	
10	Slayr	Avant Nova	Self-released	
10	SosMula	Yung Plane Krash	Atlantic, Limosa Nostra	
10	Summer Cem	Duman	Warner Central Europe	
10	Uzi	Kan II	Universal Türkiye	
10	Yungeen Ace	Pain & War is Art	Self-released	
11	24hrs	Star Aura	DayDreamsAreRare	
11	Baby Smoove	Baby 2	Forever Franchise	
13	Young Posse	Young Tape	DSPmedia	
15	Raq Baby	Still Spillin	Santa Anna	
16	Larry June	Who Coppin	Freeminded, Empire	Debuted at No. 29 on the Billboard 200
17	1300	Illsamgonggong	One Three Hundred, Universal Korea	
17	Brian Ennals & Blockhead	Boatshoes	Phantom Limb	
17	Bubba Sparxxx	In Case You Missed It	Self-released	
17	Dame Atlas	If i'm being honest	Broke	
17	Dardan & Azet	Eurosport 2	Fastlife, Hypnotize	
17	Dave Blunts	I'll Believe It When I See It	Listen to the Kids	
17	DJ Spanish Fly	Cadillac Warning	Untitled (recs)	
17	Gangrene	Better Than McDonald's	ALC	
17	Icewear Vezzo	Rich Off Pints 4	Iced Up	
17	Judah Weston & IsoKeys	Why So Much Hate	GoodTalk	
17	MamboLosco	Yacht Club	Atlantic Italy, Warner Italy	
17	MudBaby Ru	Out The Mud	Flawless, Geffen	
17	Pan Amsterdam	Hot Potato	Def Pressé	
17	Powfu	Tomorrow the sun won't rise	Self-released	
17	Rick Ross	Set in Stone	Maybach Music, Gamma.	Debuted at No. 39 on the Billboard 200
17	Rome Streetz	Sock It 2 My Pocket	Mass Appeal	
17	SSGKobe	Pnthr	ForbiddenWillows	
17	Tory Lanez	Made You Think I Was Gone ...But	One Umbrella	Debuted at No. 33 on the Billboard 200
17	Tricky	Different When It's Silent	False Idols	
17	Yuke	Cheetah World 3	Self-released	
23	Nines	Lost Tapes	Zino, Empire	Debuted at No. 14 on the UK Albums Chart
24	88 Ultra	Brood Of Vipers	Self-released	
24	Apollo Brown	No Pressure, No Diamond	Escapism	
24	BabyDrill	Still Dangerous	Slaughter Gang	
24	BBY Goyard	Preakness	Self-released	
24	Cakes da Killa	New Bitch	Magic City	
24	Cleffy	I'll Cry Tomorrow	Soka, Mercury	
24	Cypress Hill	Dios Bendiga	Zarpazo, Hybe Latin America	
24	DJ Spinz & Travis Porter	Party Pack	Tunefreak, Hitmaker	
24	Loe Shimmy	Pretty Girlz Run The World	Rebel, Gamma.	Debuted at No. 68 on the Billboard 200
24	Mavo	Business	Inner Circle	
24	MC Serch	Millions of Zeros	DNA	
24	Midwxst	Solitude in Silence	Rebellion	
24	Nems & Ron Browz	I Should Boom You Too	Gorilla, Etherboy	
24	Pashanim	Lounge Musik	Urban	
24	Real Boston Richey	S.O.S.	Freebandz	
24	Rico Nasty	RX	Sugar Trap	
24	Sheff G	Weight On Me	Winners Circle, RCA	
24	Songer	What If I Say No?	Hard Reality	Debuted at No. 66 on the UK Albums Chart
24	Token	I'm Leaving Soon	Never Too Different	
24	Yatta Bandz	One & The Same	Empire	
25	Kingpin Skinny Pimp	Skinny Pimp Vol 2	Self-released	
27	Cappadonna	A Work in Progress	GLF	
29	Dave East & Harry Fraud	Price of Pain	FTD, Srfschl	
30	Kota the Friend	Just Happy To Be Here!	Fltbys	
30	Money Man	Don't Try This At Home	Black Circle, Empire	
31	24HRSnTOKYO (24hrs & MadeinTYO)	Trim Bros	Self-released	
31	Bbykobe	Pussy Pink	BPG, Warner	
31	Bones	AsTheBluntBurnsSlow	Team Sesh, Empire	
31	Chuuwee	Life is Too Long	Making Lots-a-$$$$	
31	Homeboy Sandman & Jack Splash	Resonance Frequency	Soulspazm	
31	Juicy J	The Clock Don't Go Back	Trippy	
31	K.A.A.N. & D-Ace	The Modern Odyssey	Self-released	
31	Kurupt & DJ Battlecat	Tales From My Hood	Death Row	
31	Lil Tony	Elijah	Self-released	
31	Lil Uzi Vert	Maverick Almost Forever	Cor(e), Roc Nation	Debuted at No. 25 on the Billboard 200
31	Logic	Paradise Records	Boom	
31	Mad Skillz	A Hero and a Villain	Big Kidz	
31	Onyx	It All Started in Brooklyn	Self-released	
31	Shaboozey	The Outlaw Cherie Lee & Other Western Tales	American Dogwood, Empire	Debuted at No. 12 on the Billboard 200
31	Too Short	Sir Too $hort, Vol. 2 (Drink & Smoke)	Empire	
31	Tyga	Starface	Last Kings, Empire	

=== August ===
Day	Artist(s)	Album	Record label(s)	Entering chart position
2	The Musalini & 9th Wonder	The Don & Eye 3	Perfect Time	
4	Nino Paid	Somewhere Over The Rainbow	Signal, Columbia	
5	Duckwrth	A.A.F.B-Sides	Them Hellas, The Blind Youth, Stem	
5	Nickelus F	Hardbody	Trick Dice	
6	Baby Boy	Buck*	TheNamelessCollective, Epic	
7	1300Saint	NewDrug2.	YSL	
7	Blocboy JB	Free Agent	Create	
7	Compton Av & Steelz	Summer 26	Rich Off Rap, Cook Gods, Empire	
7	Derez De'Shon	I'm Not Ok But...	Connect, Cinq	
7	FattMack	Mr. Did It By Hisself 3	Great Day, Santa Anna	
7	G Ravon	Princess Drill	4EFTW, Create	
7	Glizzy Glow	Trench Baddie	2Valid, Geffen	
7	Hurricane Wisdom	Weathering The World	Rebel, Gamma	Debuted at No. 108 on the Billboard 200
7	Inspectah Deck	Dragon's Breath	Urban Icon, DNA	
7	MoneySign Suede	La Vida Eterna	Atlantic	
7	Pooh Shiesty	All Eyes on Shiest	1017	Debuted at No. 7 on the Billboard 200
7	Q-Unique & DJ Rhettmatic	The QR Code	Capital Q	
7	Roy Woods	X	OVO	
7	Starlito	It's Strict Over Here Lyrics	Grind Hard, Connect	
10	BSlime	W.A.W.G.	YSL	
12	Dillom	La Nueva Violencia	Bohemian Groove	
12	Flames Dot Malik	The Fix 2	Black Soprano Family	
12	Sk8star	The Beautiful Rebellion	W4th, Island	
14	Big Baby Gandhi	Kashapp Patel	Self-released	
14	Channel Tres	Enigma POV	Alta	
14	Fridayy	Tension	Lost In Melody, Def Jam	
14	Girl Talk, Michael Christmas & Chris Crack	Don't Come to My House Sharing Your Location	C&G, Illegal Art	
14	Internet Money	We All We Needed	Internet Money Records, Mercury Records	
14	Jackboy	I Can't Do No Wrong	1804, Empire	
14	Kendo Kaponi	Apocalipto	Sony US Latin	
14	Len Lucci	Goldenboy	Lizzy	
14	Nechazz	Pieces of a Dream	Habibi Funk	
14	Nipsey Hussle & Bino Rideaux	Prolific	Atlantic, All Money In	Debuted at No. 21 on the Billboard 200
14	Open Mike Eagle & Kenny Segal	Doomed!	Backwoodz	
14	P-Lo	Out The Box	Everywhere Like Air, Empire	
14	Paul Wall & Termanology	Repeat Repeat Repeat	Perfect Time	
14	StanWill	$tanley	Hip Hop Lab, Empire	
14	Trippie Redd	NDA	1400	Debuted at No. 50 on the Billboard 200
14	YTB Fatt	Vera Volpe	Loaf Boyz, 10K Projects	
17	Sickboyrari	Out Da Vault	Goth Money	
18	Casper TNG	Draft Day	Universal Canada	
19	Xavier Wulf	Cool World	Dragon Fang Gang, Empire	
20	Beenie Man	Eminence	Billboard King	
20	Fatt Smaxk	Smaxk Season 3: Banks House	Self-released	Debuted at No. 188 on the Billboard 200
21	Denzel Curry & Kenneth Blume	II	Loma Vista	
21	Ice-T	Criminal Migraine	Self-released	
21	K-Trap	Trapo II	Thousand8	Debuted at No. 86 on the UK Albums Chart
21	Khantrast	Poster Child	New 11	
21	Mike Shabb	Sewaside IV	Blk	
21	Miss Kaninna	Blackprint	AWAL	Debuted at No. 8 on the ARIA Albums Chart
21	Nate Sib	Reborn	Republic	
21	Nerve	Growing Pains	Self-released	Debuted at No. 14 on the ARIA Albums Chart
21	Prettifun	Pretti Loves U 2	Victor Victor	
21	Rapsody	God Gotta Afro & Gold Hoops	Roc Nation	
21	Romeo Miller	New Lane	Romeoland, Dungee, SoNo	
21	Sean Leon	To: Summer	Opposition	
21	Skilla Baby	The Price Of Fame	Geffen	
21	$not	High + Risk	Broke	
21	The Game	The Documentary III	Numinati, FTS Global Management	Debuted at No. 68 on the Billboard 200
21	Thirteendegrees	Ghetto Hipster	Island	
21	Victony	Starlife	Outlawville, Encore	
21	Yung Bleu	Bleu Vandross 4	Broke Genius	
25	Busta Rhymes & J Dilla	Dillagence II	The Conglomerate	
26	Bishop Nehru	I Hate My Birthday: Moments Before Forever	Nehruvia	
26	Saint Jhn	If Tomorrow Never Comes	Godd Complexx, Roc Nation	
27	Demahjiae	Yae	Empire	
27	Ken Carson	Cartunez	Opium, Interscope	
27	Robb Banks	Unhappy – Side A	430	
28	Arden Jones	Flash	Its nbd	
28	Bartesianwater & Smokedope2016	Wat3r	Self-released	
28	Boohavinn	ROTY	Broke	
28	Boosie Badazz & C-Murder	Hood Stories	Bad Azz, Tru, Connect	
28	Cities Aviv	Even Colder Spring	D.O.T.	
28	Czarface & Frankie Pulitzer	Czarface Meets Frankie Pulitzer	Silver Age	Debuted at No. 96 on the Billboard 200
28	Dahi	Black Boy (Alternative)	Alter	
28	E-40	Turning My Money Over	Heavy on the Grind, Virgin	
28	Erykah Badu & The Alchemist	Before the World Blows	Control Freaq, Empire	
28	Fat Joe	Organized Rhyme	RNG, Empire	
28	Headie One	MMM	One Records	
28	Jay Worthy & George Clinton	Generation P	GDF, Empire	
28	Lancey Foux	The Time of Our Lives	RCA, Human Re Sources	
28	Mike D	Thank You	Fontana	
28	Night Lovell	My Blood as the Ink	G59	
28	Rod Wave	Don't Look Down	Alamo	Debuted at No. 1 on the Billboard 200
28	Saul Williams	Leap Life	Big Dada	
28	The Diplomats	Double Trouble	Self-released	
28	Trippie Redd	#NDA	1400, 10K Projects	
28	Villano Antillano	Ante el Umbral del Peligro No Siento Temor	La Buena Fortuna	
28	Vory	Dondada	Eros, Empire	
28	Wyclef Jean	Q Theory – Quantum Leap, Vol. 2	SodoMoodLab	
28	YNW Melly	Collect Call II	YNW4L	
28	YSL Records & Young Thug	Slime Language 3	YSL, Create	Debuted at No. 146 on the Billboard 200
28	Yxng Bane	Before I Explain	Winners Globe, Amuseio AB	
31	Skaiwater	Femme Fatale	GoodTalk	

=== September ===
Day	Artist(s)	Album	Record label(s)	Entering chart position
1	Matt Ox	Oxytape	Self-released	
1	Nasty C & Tellaman	T's & C's Apply	TallRacks, Select Play	
2	03 Greedo	Last Night Out	Alamo	
2	Fuego Base	Still The Biggest	Black Soprano Family	
2	Mike Dimes	B.I.L.L.Y	Kastaway, Hitmaker	
2	Monk.E & Mike Shabb	Le précieux joyau	Self-released	
3	Hieroglyphics	All Said And Done	Self-released	
3	Low Clika	El Primer Album de Low Clika	Hybe Latin America	
4	414JungleBaby	Everybody Watching	300	
4	Aaron May	Enjoy The Ride	Empire	
4	Blu & Sndtrak	LA	Nature Sounds	
4	Cyst (Iglooghost & daisy*)	ᲘᲘ	Luckyme	
4	Dizzee Rascal	We Want Bass	Big Dirtee	
4	Doseone, Wino Willy & Zetroc	Sighting	Self-released	
4	Eva B	Queen of the South	Silent Roar	
4	Fuse & AraabMuzik	Womanizer	Self-released	
4	J-Ax	Vita Morte Miracoli	Columbia, Sony Italy	
4	Karrahbooo	Not Da 2	NotTheTwo	
4	Lazer Dim 700	LD7	Fast Music	
4	Mauvais Djo	L'undertaker, Pt.2	Nojoke	
4	Mykki Blanco	Cafe Paradiso	Transgressive	
4	Nemzzz	Locked In	Self-released	Debuted at No. 64 on the UK Albums Chart
4	Punchmade Dev	Free_Methods.zip	Punchmade, Create	
4	RJMrLA & Joe Moses	Never Left	Ommio, N.W.B., Empire	
4	Sylvan LaCue	Depths of a Man: A Memoir by Sylvan LaCue	WiseUp & Co	
10	Tsu Surf	Real Inside Cold Outside	Raw Bunch	
11	D-Block Europe & French Montana	Worldwide Wave	Self-released	
11	Don Trip & Starlito	Starlito's Way 5: Catharsis I Chrisopher Season 5	MRVL	
11	EST Gee	Bigger than the Devil	CMG, Interscope	Debuted at No. 86 on the Billboard 200
11	Ezra Collective	Here Because of Hope	Partisan	Debuted at No. 1 on the UK Albums Chart
11	Hell Razah, 88 Ultra & Blue Sky Black Death	Blood on the Chessboard	Self-released	
11	Hoodrich Pablo Juan	The Bloprint	Empire	
11	Nine Vicious	Sedition	Studio Addicts, Create	
11	Pac Div	Still Sealed, Vol. 1	Self-released	
11	Rio da Yung OG	The World Is Yours	Mine, Empire	
11	Standing on the Corner	SOTC ("II")	XL	
11	TisaKorean	Raw	Jazzzy, Good Luck Have Fun, Empire	
11	Unknown T	Listen.	Stay Solid	
12	Bizzy Bone	Mozaic Art	Jam TV	
13	RXKNephew	Listen 2 This Tape B4 I Beat Yo Ass	New Breed Trapper	
15	Rels B	Fill de la mar (2026)	Dale Play, Flakk	
16	Chow Lee	Please Behave!	Empire	
16	Djadja & Dinaz	Matière Noire	Huit Clos, AllPoints	
18	22simba	Miria	Island	
18	Abhi the Nomad & Illmac	Illmad	Universe Goods	
18	Aymen	Goldjunge	Moon Boys, Epic	
18	AZ Chike	No Rest for the Wicked	Warner	
18	Bangerfabrique	Made it out of the groupchat	TwoSides, Sony	
18	Billi0n	Pt. 5 Haute	10K Projects	
18	Cookin' Soul	Gunn Tape	Self-released	
18	Duke Deuce	America is Ours	Made Men Movement, Hitmaker	
18	Gilli	Verden Er Din	MXlll, Universal Denmark	
18	Grand Corps Malade	Voir la mer	Anouche, Virgin France	
18	Hunxho	I Quit Rap	300	
18	Kerza	Kersast Kerzaks	Atlantic	
18	Lucy Bedroque	C	DeadAir	
18	Major Nine	Lil Tape 3	Touch Money	
18	Rakim, Kurupt & Masta Killa	The Godbody	Holy Toledo, DMG, Compound Interest	
18	Seyi Vibez	Swaguu	NSNV, Empire	
18	Yeat	Cocoon	Lyfestyle Corporation, Field Trip, Capitol	Debuted at No. 88 on the Billboard 200
25	909 Petey & Camoflauge Monk	Astro	Griselda	
25	Anthny	Worship Leader's Diary	Provident	
25	Apollo Brown & Skyzoo	Luxury Tax	Escapism, First Generation Rich	
25	Arian730	1of1	Warner Czech	
25	Big Moochie Grape & Zaytoven	Grapetoven	Paper Route Empire	
25	DDG	Hit-A-Thon	Epic	Debuted at No. 141 on the Billboard 200
25	Emjay	Pop Pesado	Warner Mexico	
25	Fleeky Bang	Anti	Kakao	
25	J.I the Prince of N.Y	Tears From a Weeping Prince	G*Starr Ent	
25	Kardinal Offishall	Firestarter Vol. 2: Everyday, Sometimes...	Self-released	
25	Lil Yee	All Dawgs Go 2 Heaven	G-Affair, Empire	
25	Mars Kumari & Del the Funky Homosapien	Skeletor Bag	Handsmade	
25	Megiapa	Intentions	International Anthem	
25	Murda	Uzay	Self-released	
25	Philthy Rich	Seminary Hall of Fame	FOD Ent	
25	Raz Fresco & Nicholas Craven	Boulangerie Deux	Low Tech	
25	Real Bad Man & Mooch	Terminator Shit	Self-released	
25	Remy Ma	Alimony	Reminisce, DNA, Hitmaker	
25	Salt	Salty N Lit	Self-released	
25	Tee Grizzley	They Forgot	300	
25	Tiakola	WpointM	Warner France	
25	Tom Morello	Everyone Gets Everything They Want	Commandante, Mom+Pop	
25	Trae tha Truth & Mozzy	Still Tapped In	ABN, Empire	
25	Your Old Droog	Bread & Butter	Nature Sounds	
25	Ziak	Monsieur Loyal	Errro, Chrome Castle, The Orchard France	
27	Slug Christ	Perverse Hymnal	Awful	
28	MC Cabelinho	Escorpião	Bairro 13	
30	DJ Okawari	Fade	Up Stairs	
30	Odetari	Phazon Varia	Artist Partner Group	
30	Yhapojj	A New Genre 3	Self-released	

=== October ===
Day	Artist(s)	Album	Record label(s)	Entering chart position
1	Changmo	Monolith	Morient	
1	Daringer	348, Vol. 3	Self-released	
1	Dendemann	Doch!	Self-released	
2	B.I.G.100, Vinny Idol & DJ Kay Slay	Ten Toes Down	Idolize	
2	BLP Kosher	Grip Thumb 2 Paper Cuts	Dreidel Gang	
2	Cory Gunz	96 Era	Militia	
2	Hardo	Some Gifts Are Priceless 2	Trap Illustrated	
2	Jackzebra	Zhuang Zhuang Mixtape	Surf Gang	
2	Mickey Diamond & Big Ghost	B.I.L.L.Y.	Self-released	
2	Mickey Diamond & Big Ghost	B.I.L.L.Y. 2	Self-released	
2	Myalansky & Action Figure 973	Criminal Enterprise	Astra	
2	NoCap	Heaven on Mars	Atlantic	Debuted at No. 56 on the Billboard 200
2	Quadeca	Life 1	X8	
2	Quavo	Qrömelife	Quality Control Music, Motown	Debuted at No. 103 on the Billboard 200
2	Rockitneedspace & Surf Gang	Next Day Air.	Tan Cressida	
2	The Koreatown Oddity	Purdy	Stones Throw	
2	Ufo361	Waldemar Hof	Vertigo	
2	YN Jay	Moody Beats	YN	
4	Rich Homie Quan	GIA: Going In Afterlife	Self-released	
5	Bones	PublicBroadcast	TeamSesh, Empire	
6	Talha Anjum	Troublesome '96	Kattar Karachi	
8	Lil Zay Osama	Hood Bible III	Dragonfly	
9	Berner	Sitting Bull	Bern One	
9	Chase & Status	Generic Everything	2ruff	Debuted at No. 2 on the UK Albums Chart
9	Dawn Richard	Creole Culture	Merge	
9	Johnny Venus	The 11th Hour	Sincethe80s, Epic	
9	Kashdami	Blueprint	Infiniti	
9	Lucy	Citizen's Arrest	Self-released	
9	Neffa & Fabri Fibra	Zarathustra Style	Numero Uno, Sony Italy	
9	Ovrkast	Striking	Three Times Louder	
9	Pitbull	Pitcoin	Mr.305	
9	Sergei Barracuda	Entropie	Virgin	
9	Sueco	Party's Over	Suecotic	
9	Tobe Nwigwe	The Bridge	Human Re Sources	
9	Yung Saint Paul	Draussen Zuhause	Kumpelmusik, Sony	
14	100BandPlan	Hell on Earth	Universal Canada	
14	Dei V	Flavorz Pack	Rimas	
14	Mutant Academy	We'll Swap It Out, Vol. 2	Roc Nation	
15	Nsqk	Mosca	Honey	
15	Ski Aggu	Ski Aggu Musik	Jungeratze	
16	Babyfxce E	The X Tape 2	Atlantic	
16	Bambi	B	Universal Polska	
16	Blaqbonez	Nomadinho: 4th Prime	Chocolate City	
16	Booba	Blanco Nemesis	Tallac	
16	Chaii	VIP	BMG	
16	Evidence	Squirrel Tape Instrumentals, Vol. 4	Bigger Picture	
16	Fredo Bang	Laugh Now Cry Later	Empire	
16	Gucci Mane	Against All Odds	1017	
16	Heuss l'Enfoiré	Après La Saisie	Verdansk	
16	Jay1	Final Wave	Run Things	
16	Joony	Still Here	211	
16	Kxng Crooked	West Coast '96	Hitmaker	
16	La Fouine	Silence Radio	Banlieue Sale	
16	Lacrim	De ma fenêtre	Plata o Plomo, Sony France	
16	Lucki	Last Laugh [archive tape]	Empire	Debuted at No. 41 on the Billboard 200
16	MC Abdul	Day by Day, Shway Shway	Empire	
16	OMB Peezy	Save Yourself	Overkill	
16	Russ Millions	OOAK Vol. 3	Self-released	
16	Ryan Trey	Faith Over Fame	JustARegularDay	
16	Slimka	On Y Va Vol.1	Colors	
16	Still Fresh	Switch Part.1	Nouvelle Ecole, Sony France	
16	Tinie Tempah	The Night's Not Dead	Imhotep, Believe	
16	Z-Ro	Forever King	One Deep	
16	Zeddy Will	#Zeddy	PMI	
20	Bally Baby	The Last Sipper	Santa Anna	
22	MC Eiht	The Story Of My Life	Bluestamp	
22	Tyla Yaweh	Heart Full of Rage 3	Rager Boy	
23	6ix & Kolo	Sonata	Self-released	
23	Anderson .Paak & Cordae	Heavy Is the Crown	Apeshit, Mass Appeal, Empire	Debuted at No. 11 on the Billboard 200
23	Brakence	Marrow	Columbia	
23	B.U.G. Antman	Colony Season	Marki, Warner	
23	Che Noir	It Takes A Village	Poetic	
23	H31R	Air Flow	Self-released	
23	Hit-Boy	The Chauncey Hollis Project II	Surf Club	
23	Killah Priest	Swift as Light 2	Proverbs	
23	La Fève	Finis-Les	Sony France	
23	Marstein	Yap.	Def Jam Nordic	
23	Noriel	Trap Island 2	Sony	
23	Shabazz Palaces	It's A Style Sport	Sub Pop	
23	That Mexican OT	Cucuy	Manifest, GoodTalk, Good Money, Capitol	
23	Toosii	Platinum Heart 2	South Coast, Capitol	
23	Vicky R	Latitude 0°	Le Crcle, Play Two	
23	Yeat	Luh Leakyz Vol. 1	Lyfestyle, Field Trip, Capitol	Debuted at No. 39 on the Billboard 200
23	Young Chris	Catch a Vibe	CDR	
23	Yung Miami	Watch Dis	Uptown, Universal	Debuted at No. 138 on the Billboard 200
24	Webbie & Boosie Badazz	Back At It	Trill	
27	Autumn!	Midnight Club 2	Self-released	
27	Various artists	The Drop: A Snowfall Saga (Original Soundtrack)	20th Century Studios	
28	Boldy James & Real Bad Man	Strobelight	Self-released	
28	MAF Teeski	Scoom or Die	Artist Partner Group	
28	Young Nudy	Just Doin Me	Self-released	
29	Lit Killah	Si Caminas Solo..	Mawz	
30	1K Phew & Timbaland	Seven Trumpets	Reach	
30	BigXthaPlug	Better Over Time	UnitedMasters	Debuted at No. 7 on the Billboard 200
30	Bktherula	N5on	Warner	
30	Bleood	Kill Your Idols	Last Chapel	
30	Blxckie	Yena	Somnyama	
30	Bugzy Malone	Make It Maintain It, Pt. 1	B-Somebody	
30	Dominic Fike	How To Quit Smoking	Columbia	Debuted at No. 69 on the Billboard 200
30	Evilgiane & Slimesito	Evilslime 2	Surf Gang	
30	Fendi P & MonstaBeatz	Monsta P	Jet Life	
30	K Carbon	First Lady	Broke	
30	Kaliii	Wit 3 iii's	Trump Card	
30	Kirk Franklin	I Am What I Am	Fo Yo Soul, Tribl, Uptown	
30	Maliibu Miitch	Sailor Goon	MNRK	
30	Mc Homeless, Ice-T & Marc Live	Goons & Goblins	Self-released	
30	Melly Mike	Time4War	Epic	
30	Nettspend	Virginia Creeper	Grade A, Interscope	
30	Bleood	Kill Your Idols	Last Chapel	
30	Nines	Young Nina	Zino	
30	PayGotti	Can Y'all Hear Me Now?	1ShotEnt, 4Hunnid, 10K Projects	
30	Phyno	Let That Sink in	Penthauze	
30	Sampa the Great	Nu Zamrock	Loma Vista	
30	The Game	Unreleased Lost Files	Last Stand, Hitmaker	
31	Sheek Louch	Gorillaween Vol. 8	D Block	
31	Snoop Dogg	The Hollow	Death Row	

=== November ===
Day	Artist(s)	Album	Record label(s)	Entering chart position
4	Asteria	7 Days to Die	Artist Partner Group	
5	Duki	A Veces Solo Me Divierto	Dale Play	
5	Plutónio	Vendetta: Veni, Vidi, Vici	Bridgetown, Sony Portugal	
6	1900Rugrat	Roll N' Rock	Remain Solid	
6	Babyxsosa	BB	Self-released	
6	Cruel Santino	K.O.T.B: The Bomberman Chronicles	Native Sounds, Warner	
6	Curren$y & Harry Fraud	Off To The Races	Jet Life, Srfschl	
6	Dardan	Dilemma	Hypnotize	
6	Dom Corleo	So F*cking Awesome	Self-released	
6	Jack Harlow	Sweet Action II	Atlantic	
6	Lil Baby	Fresh	Quality Control, Motown	Debuted at No. 2 on the Billboard 200
6	Mathematics	Black Samson: The Saga Continues	DNA, Hitmaker	
6	Mike Ladd	Nonechosen	Backwoodz	
6	Miles Minnick	Christlike University	Glo, Empire	
6	Real Bad Man	On High Alert Vol. 5	Self-released	
6	Rocco Hunt & Clementino	The Album	Epic	
6	Shygirl	Swallow!	Because	
6	Skepta	The Fork and Knife	Big Smoke, Epic	Debuted at No. 4 on the UK Albums Chart
6	SOB X RBE	From The Land	Empire	
6	Statik Selektah	Expensive Taste	Mass Appeal	
6	Summer Cem	Duman	Warner Central Europe	
6	Waima	Extazza	Def Jam Poland	
6	Willyynova & Mike Shabb	The Voynich Manuscript	Blk	
9	BAK Jay	Until The Return	10K Projects	
11	2hollis	Pirouette	Interscope	
11	Armand Hammer	Snakes & Ladders	Backwoodz	
11	Berner & B-Real	Inside The Bag	Self-released	
11	Breeze Mantana & Chase N. Cashe	Wolves in Vicuña	Goldminds	
11	Bruiser Wolf & Conductor Williams	The Dealer Wins	Station, Bruiser House	
11	Ysy A	El Trap De Tu País	Sponsor Dios	
12	Ecco2k	Echo	9th	
13	Aesop Rock & Blockhead	Trouble Mountain	Rhymesayers	
13	Babyface Ray	Unfuckwitable 2	Wavy Gang, Empire	
13	Belly Gang Kushington	Good Dope Sell Itself	LVRN	
13	Benny the Butcher & Black Soprano Family	A Friend Of Ours 2	Perfect Time	
13	Blackhaine	Saints In The Wethouse	XL	
13	88 Ultra	Chromatic	Self-released	
13	Boldy James	Bentayga Genesis	Royal House	
13	Connie Diiamond	Unleashed	MNRK	
13	Dopebwoy	Project Flex	Aplco	
13	Domiziana	Velina	Groove Attack	
13	Ericdoa	Música Divino	Listen to the Kids	
13	Icegergert	Amen	Gaz	
13	Internet Girl	Yes	Pack, Create	
13	Jackie Hill Perry	Still Blameless	Reach	
13	Jay Montana	Until The Return	10K Projects	
13	Jungle Jack & Tony Toxik	La Revanche des Cafards	PIAS	
13	Kodie Shane	Obsession	YHT	
13	MC Hariel	Aplauso Não Paga As Contas!	Warner Brasil	
13	Montana 700	Reminiscing	Remain Solid, 300	
13	Niro	Mentalité	Ambition, Sony France	
13	Offset	GMFU	Motown	
13	SDM	In Infinitum	IG	
13	Sheng	Cry_baby	Argentic	
13	Sleepy Hallow	Still Sleep??	Winners Circle	
13	Tay-K	#MonstersUnderMyBed	RR4L, Create, Broke	
13	Terror Reid	Drowned God	Self-released	
13	Tezzus	Mømma Bøyz	Young Stoner Life	
13	Vory	Eros 3.0 Fallout	Empire	
13	Westside Gunn	Heelmatic	Griselda, Mass Appeal	
13	Wiz Khalifa	Cool	Taylor Gang	
13	ZelooperZ & Black Noi$e	Pinbreakers	Tan Cressida	

== Upcoming releases ==
=== November ===
Day	Artist(s)	Album	Record label(s)	Ref.
19	Various artists	Grand Theft Auto VI: The Album	Atlantic, Take-Two	
20	Conway the Machine	Otis	Drumwork	
20	EBK Young Joc	Midnight in Nightingale	Empire	
20	Mez	Electric Future Gangster	Mass Appeal	
20	YFN Lucci	Everything I Said I Am. / Everything She Said She Is.	Already Legend	
26	Big Sad 1900	At Peace With Myself, At War With The World	Empire	
27	Chip	Cannon	Mass Appeal	
27	Czarface	Special Presentation	Silver Age	
27	OsamaSon	Nocturnal	Motion, Atlantic	
30	BabyTron	Bin Reaper IV	The Hip Hop Lab, Empire	
30	Dee-1	The Shift	Self-released	

=== December ===
Day	Artist(s)	Album	Record label(s)	Ref.
4	2 Chainz	Playaz Only Live Once	Empire Distribution	
4	Homeboy Sandman	I Can't Sell These 5	Dirty Looks	
4	Homeboy Sandman	Turns Out I Can Sell A Few of These After All 3	Dirty Looks	
4	Narcy	Yassin / ياسين	We are the Medium	
4	Yelawolf	45	Slumerican	
4	Don Toliver	Nitrous	Cactus Jack Records,Epic Records	
18	2 Dead Boyz (Meechy Darko & Zombie Juice)	No1Lives4Ever	No Pulse, Ineffable	

=== Unscheduled and TBA ===
Artist(s)	Album	Record label(s)	Ref.
Ab-Soul	Soul Burger: The Odyssey	TDE	
Armani Caesar	The Liz 3	Griselda	
BabyTron & Ankith Woods	Tron & Kith Go To White Castle	No Fun League	
Beanie Sigel	TBA	Self-released	
Big Boi	Boomiverse 2	Epic	
Big Daddy Kane	Curtain Call	TBA	
Black Thought	Streams Of Thought Vol. 4	TBA	
Bone Thugs-n-Harmony	TBA	Greenback	
Busta Rhymes	Vengeance	Conglomerate, Epic	
Cam'ron	Cam'ron Presents: Frederica	Killa, DNA	
Cardi B	TBA	Atlantic	
Cash Cobain	Party with Slizzy	Giant	
Chris Patrick	Saint	Def Jam	
Coi Leray	Multi	Epic	
Conway the Machine	I Heard You Paint Houses Too	Drumwork	
Danger Mouse & Black Thought	Cheat Codes 2	BMG	
Death Grips	TBA	TBA	
Destroy Lonely	Drop Dead Gorgeous	Opium	
Diamond*	Jubilee	Hallwood, YSL	
DJ Khaled	Aalam of God	We The Best, Republic	
DMX	DMX Features	SYB, Twenty Nine, DNA Music, Hitmaker	
Doechii	TBA	TDE	
Droogie Otis (Madlib & Your Old Droog)	TBA	Beat Konducta, Secretly	
E-40	Rule of Thumb 2	Heavy On The Grind	
Erick the Architect	Afterburner	Mass Appeal	
Fimiguerrero	Lost City	Lizzy	
Flo Milli	FloState	Jive, Sony	
Freddie Gibbs & Kaytranada	TBA	TBA	
French Montana & Max B	Night to Remember	Coke Boys	
GloRilla	TBA	CMG	
Gunna	Splurge	YSL, 300	
Gunna & Offset	TBA	YSL, 300, Motown	
Hit-Boy	Sftwre Updte	Surf Club	
HXG	Madness	Opium, Interscope	
Ice Spice	Rosadita	10K, Capitol	
Jace!	Pajama	Slang	
Jadakiss & Beanie Sigel	Kiss the Mack	Def Jam	
Jay Rock	Eastside Johnny	Top Dawg, Interscope	
JID & Metro Boomin	God Doesn't Like Ugly	Dreamville, Boominati Worldwide	
K-os	TBA	Spiritual Tech	
Kevin Abstract	Honey In My Hair	Virgin, X8, Juno	
Lady London	To Whom It May Concern	High Standardz, Def Jam	
Lazer Dim 700	Disaster 2	Self-released	
Lil Gotit	Everything or Nothing	Broke	
Lil Mosey	Northsbest 2	Black 17	
Lil Nas X	Dreamboy	Columbia	
Ludacris	TBA	Disturbing tha Peace, Def Jam	
Mach-Hommy & Black Thought	Black-Hommy	TBA	
Maglera Doe Boy	TBA	Exodus, Epic	
Meekz	Mr. Can't Stop Won't Stop	Self-released	
Megan Thee Stallion	Megan: Act 3	Hot Girl Productions, Interscope	
Moneybagg Yo	Forever Hold Your Peace	CMG, Interscope	
Nettspend & OsamaSon	NXO	TBA	
Noname	Cartoon Radio	Self-released	
Pharoahe Monch	External Affairs	TBA	
Playboi Carti	Baby Boi	AWGE, Interscope	
Pusha T & Pharrell Williams	TBA	Def Jam	
Real Boston Richey	Public Housing 3	Freebandz, Epic	
Reese Laflare	Rated R Superstar	Self-released	
Rich the Kid	C'est La Vie	Rimas	
Roc Marciano	Criminal Jazz	Art That Kills, Marci Enterprises	
Roddy Ricch	The Navy Album	Atlantic Records	
Saweetie	Pretty Bitch Music	Artistry, Warner	
Schoolboy Q	Thank Que	Top Dawg	
Skrilla	TBA	Priority	
Slayr	Fabula Nova	Columbia	
Smokepurpp	Deadstar 3	Alamo	
Sosocamo	TBA	Broke	
St. Lunatics	TBA	TBA	
Stove God Cooks	All This For Me?	Babygrande	
Styles P	Ghost Of The Past, Present and Future Vol. 1	Pentagon	
Summrs	Badman	Self-released	
Takeoff	TBA	Quality Control, Motown	
The Roots	Endgame	TBA	
Teezo Touchdown	Casting Call	Not Fit For Society, RCA	
Trap Dickey	How I'm Livin'	Top Dawg	
Travis Scott	TBA	Cactus Jack, Epic	
Trim	Pass the Tiara	BuVision	
Veeze	Worst Tape	Navy Wavy, Warner	
Wale	Early Hours	Def Jam	
Westside Gunn	Flygod Is An Awesome God III	Griselda Records	
Xzibit	Kingmaker 2	Greenback	
Yasiin Bey & The Alchemist	Forensics	Self-released	
YKNiece	You Know Niece	Self-released	
Young Thug	DBC	YSL, 300, Atlantic	
¥$	Vultures 3	YZY	

== Highest-charting songs ==
=== United States ===
Hip hop songs from any year which charted in the 2026 Top 40 of the Billboard Hot 100
Song	Artist	Project	Peak position
"Janice STFU"	Drake	Iceman	1
"Ran to Atlanta"	Drake featuring Future and Molly Santana	Iceman	2
"Whisper My Name"	Drake	Iceman	3
"Shabang"	Drake	Iceman	4
"National Treasures"	Drake	Iceman	6
"Make Them Cry"	Drake	Iceman	7
"Dust"	Drake	Iceman	8
"2 Hard 4 the Radio"	Drake	Iceman	9
"Make Them Pay"	Drake	Iceman	10
"Plot Twist"	Drake	Iceman	11
"FDO"	Pooh Shiesty	All Eyes on Shiest	12
"What You Saying"	Lil Uzi Vert	TBA	12
"B's on the Table"	Drake featuring 21 Savage	Iceman	12
"Burning Bridges"	Drake	Iceman	13
"Body"	Don Toliver	Octane	14
"E85"	Don Toliver	Octane	15
"WGFT"	Gunna featuring Burna Boy	The Last Wun	16
"Two Six"	J. Cole	The Fall-Off	16
"Spend Dat"	Yung Miami	Watch Dis	17
"Dead Fresh"	Lil Baby	Fresh	18
"Little Birdie"	Drake	Iceman	18
"Make Them Remember"	Drake	Iceman	19
"Make Them Know"	Drake	Iceman	21
"Father"	Kanye West featuring Travis Scott	Bully	21
"Hoe Phase"	Drake	Maid of Honour	22
"Don't Worry"	Drake	Iceman	23
"California Girls"	Future	The Real Me	23
"Stay Here 4 Life"	A$AP Rocky featuring Brent Faiyaz	Don't Be Dumb	23
"Helicopter"	A$AP Rocky	Don't Be Dumb	24
"ATM"	Don Toliver	Octane	25
"Cinderella"	Mac Miller featuring Ty Dolla $ign	The Divine Feminine	25
"Ah Ha"	Cardi B	TBA	25
"Hell at Night"	BigXthaPlug featuring Ella Langley	I Hope You're Happy	26
"Pop Dat Thang"	DaBaby	Be More Grateful	26
"All the Love"	Kanye West featuring André Troutman	Bully	27
"4 Raws"	EsDeeKid	Rebel	28
"WNBA"	Drake	Habibti	28
"Fukk a Interview"	Future	The Real Me	28
"Konnichiwa"	Future	The Real Me	29
"Safety"	J. Cole	The Fall-Off	29
"Secondhand"	Don Toliver featuring Rema	Octane	29
"Rendezvous"	Don Toliver featuring Yeat	Octane	30
"Poor Thang"	J. Cole	The Fall-Off	30
"Firm Friends"	Drake	Iceman	31
"Run a Train"	J. Cole and Future	The Fall-Off	33
"Let 'Em Know"	T.I.	Kill the King	33
"Stole Ya Flow"	A$AP Rocky	Don't Be Dumb	33
"One Two"	Future	The Real Me	33
"Bunce Road Blues"	J. Cole, Future, and Tems	The Fall-Off	34
"Good Flirts"	Baby Keem featuring Kendrick Lamar and Momo Boyd	Casino	34
"Tiramisu"	Don Toliver	Octane	35
"Rosary"	Don Toliver featuring Travis Scott	Octane	36
"Legacy"	J. Cole and PJ	The Fall-Off	36
"Casino"	Baby Keem	Casino	37
"Motion Party"	BossMan Dlow	Chicken Talkin Bastard	37
"Tank Top Pluto"	Future	The Real Me	37
"Snow in Skyami"	Future	The Real Me	38
"Ya Hit"	Future featuring Drake, Travis Scott and Loe Shimmy	TBA	38
"Slap the City"	Drake featuring Qendresa	Habibti	39
"King"	Kanye West	Bully	40
"Piece of Your Love"	Rod Wave	Don't Look Down	40

=== United Kingdom ===
Hip hop songs from any year which charted in the 2026 Top 10 of the UK Singles Chart
Song	Artist	Project	Peak position
"Raindance"	Dave featuring Tems	The Boy Who Played the Harp	1

== Highest first-week consumption ==
List of albums with the highest first-week consumption (sales + streaming + track equivalent), as of September 2026 in the United States
Number	Album	Artist	1st-week consumption	1st-week position	Refs
1	Arirang	BTS	641,000	1	
2	Iceman	Drake	463,000	1	
3	The Fall-Off	J. Cole	280,000	1	
4	Octane	Don Toliver	162,000	1	
5	Bully	Kanye West	152,000	2	
6	The Real Me	Future	131,000	1	
7	Don't Be Dumb	A$AP Rocky	123,000	1	
8	Maid of Honour	Drake	110,000	3	
9	Don't Look Down	Rod Wave	99,000	1	
10	Casino	Baby Keem	72,000	4	

== All critically reviewed albums ranked ==
=== Metacritic ===
Number	Artist	Album	Average score	Number of reviews	Reference
1	Armand Hammer	Snakes & Ladders	90	4 reviews	
2	Vince Staples	Cry Baby	88	15 reviews	
3	Genesis Owusu	Redstar Wu & the Worldwide Scourge	88	10 reviews	
4	Ezra Collective	Here Because of Hope	86	10 reviews	
5	Saul Williams	Leap Life	85	5 reviews	
6	Isaiah Rashad	It's Been Awful	83	9 reviews	
7	Erykah Badu & The Alchemist	Before the World Blows	83	4 reviews	
8	Kneecap	Fenian	82	16 reviews	
9	Sampa the Great	Nu Zamrock	82	4 reviews	
10	Open Mike Eagle & Kenny Segal	Doomed!	81	11 reviews	
11	Blackhaine	Saints In The Wethouse	81	6 reviews	
12	By Storm	My Ghosts Go Ghost	80	7 reviews	
13	Aesop Rock & Blockhead	Trouble Mountain	80	6 reviews	
14	Elucid & Sebb Bash	I Guess U Had to Be There	80	4 reviews	
15	Wesley Joseph	Forever Ends Someday	79	5 reviews	
16	Mike, Earl Sweatshirt & Surf Gang	Pompeii // Utility	77	7 reviews	
17	Latto	Big Mama	75	6 reviews	
18	Shaboozey	The Outlaw Cherie Lee & Other Western Tales	75	7 reviews	
19	Baby Keem	Casino	74	8 reviews	
20	Shabazz Palaces	It's A Style Sport	74	7 reviews	
21	Skepta	The Fork and Knife	73	4 reviews	
22	Don Toliver	Octane	72	4 reviews	
23	2hollis	Pirouette	72	4 reviews	
24	A$AP Rocky	Don't Be Dumb	71	13 reviews	
25	Mike D	Thank You	71	13 reviews	
26	Denzel Curry & The Scythe	Strictly 4 the Scythe	71	4 reviews	
27	Drake	Maid of Honour	68	8 reviews	
28	J. Cole	The Fall-Off	67	9 reviews	
29	Future	The Real Me	64	5 reviews	
30	Kanye West	Bully	55	4 reviews	
31	Yeat	ADL	54	5 reviews	
32	Drake	Iceman	51	12 reviews	
33	Lizzo	Bitch	49	8 reviews	

== See also ==
- Previous article: 2025 in hip-hop
