= La Reezy =

American rapper (born 2004)

- La Reezy in October 2026

Background information
- Born: Khayree Salahuddin; September 9, 2004 (age 22)
- Origin: New Orleans, Louisiana, U.S.
- Genre: Hip-hop
- Occupations: Rapper; activist; songwriter; producer; audio engineer
- Years active: 2023–present
- Website: lareezy.com

Khayree Salahuddin (born September 9, 2004), known professionally as La Reezy, is an American rapper and activist from New Orleans, Louisiana.

== Early life ==
Salahuddin grew up in the 12th Ward near Napoleon Avenue, and graduated from New Orleans Charter Science and Mathematics High School in 2022. His great-great-grandfather was Chris Powell, who was the frontman of The Five Blue Flames. He grew up listening to Lil Wayne, Drake, and Eminem.

At the age of 14, he began to create music, his named artistic influences including Kanye West and Tyler, the Creator.

== Career ==
In fall 2025, La Reezy opened for Little Simz on her Lotus Tour in the United States. He was also included the Camp Flog Gnaw Carnival festival lineup.

In 2026, he performed at the 61st commemoration of Malcolm X. He noted of being in the space, "I always envisioned rapping as being an activist. A rap-tivist, actually." He is the founder and chief executive of the nonprofit organization UTH (pronounced "youth") Foundation, which aims to "close the opportunity gap for youth in New Orleans" by promoting youth leadership, empowerment, and community advocacy. In June 2026, Reezy was featured on the cover of XXL as part of its annual Freshman Class list alongside Chris Patrick, Belly Gang Kushington, Slayr, Trim, Trap Dickey, Babyfxce E, Hurricane Wisdom, YKNiece, Skrilla, Sosocamo and Miles Minnick. He released his debut studio album, Skiddle Bandana, on July 7, 2026.

He was featured on the track "Entry", from Busta Rhymes and J Dilla's collaborative album Dillagence II (2026).

== Artistry ==
He has cited Michael Jackson, Kanye West, Kendrick Lamar, Drake, YoungBoy Never Broke Again, Tyler, the Creator, J. Cole, and Lil Wayne as influences on his music.

== Discography ==
List of albums and mixtapes, with selected details
| Title | Mixtape details |
|---|---|
| Reeborn | Released: June 30, 2023; Label: Young Paper Chaser; Format: Digital download, streaming |
| We All Need Help | Released: October 18, 2024; Label: Self-released; Format: Digital download, streaming |
| Welcome to La Reezyana Vol 1. | Released: April 4, 2025; Label: Self-released; Format: Digital download, streaming |
| Pardon Me, I'm Different (with PJ Morton) | Released: July 4, 2025; Label: Gumbo Studios; Format: Digital download, streaming |
| Free99$ (La Reezy LLC) | Released: November 28, 2025; Label: Self-released; Format: Digital download, streaming |
| Skiddle Bandana | Album: Released: July 7, 2026; Label: UnitedMasters; Format: Digital download, streaming |

== Accolades ==
| Organization | Date of ceremony | Award | Ref. |
|---|---|---|---|
| Hip Hop Museum | October 15, 2025 | Next Up Award | |
