= TBTBT =

Canadian hip hop group

Too Bad to Be True
- Origin: Toronto, Ontario
- Genres: Canadian hip hop
- Years active: 1990–1995
- Past members: Jeromy "Lyric J" Robinson; Shaka "DJ Shaka" Dodd; Al "Al C" Cox; Frankie "MC Styles" Scarcelli

Too Bad to Be True, or TBTBT, was a Canadian hip hop group, based in Toronto, Ontario, active in the 1990s. The group was best known for its eponymous 1993 album, which won the Juno Award for Rap Recording of the Year at the 1994 Juno Awards. The group consisted of teenagers Jeromy "Lyric J" Robinson, Shaka "DJ Shaka" Dodd, Al "Al C" Cox, and Frankie "MC Styles" Scarcelli.

== History ==
TBTBT began writing and recording rhymes in 1992, while they were still in school. They took part in Toronto's annual Stay Clear anti-drug campaign pop contest. In 1993, the trio released the album One Track Mind on ISBA Records in Canada and Cold Chillin’/Warner Bros. Records internationally.

The group received significant video airplay on MuchMusic for the album's title track, but consistent with the commercial struggles faced by Canadian hip hop at the time, received almost no commercial radio airplay in Canada outside of the Toronto, Vancouver, and Montreal markets.

In 1994, the group released a second single, "Get Down to It", from its album. The track appeared on the RPM Canadian Content chart for six weeks in April and May that year.

== Legacy ==
Both of TBTBT member Jeromy Robison's sons have pursued a career in hip hop under the stage names of Casper TNG and K Money.

== Discography ==
=== Album ===
- Too Bad to be True (1993)

=== Singles ===
- "One-Track Mind"
- "Get Down to It"
