= HavinMotion =

American rapper (2004–2026)

- Also known as: Havin Motion Rx
- Born: Dwayne Omar Isaacs Jr. March 24, 2004; Bryans Road, Maryland, U.S.
- Died: April 23, 2026 (aged 22) Washington D.C., U.S.
- Genres: Hip-hop; trap
- Occupations: Rapper; songwriter
- Years active: 2022–2026

Dwayne Omar Isaacs Jr. (March 24, 2004 – April 23, 2026), known professionally as HavinMotion, was an American rapper from Bryans Road, Maryland. He began rapping in 2022 and quickly rose to fame online with his high-energy style of rap over fast-paced instrumentals, which media critics labeled as "DMV crank".

== Early life ==
Dwayne Omar Isaacs Jr was born March 24, 2004, in Bryans Road, Maryland.

== Career ==
Isaacs' career began in 2022, with his debut single being "iM SAD". That same year, he released Stuck In A Mix and Lost Files, Lost Files 2, 100 Day Run, and Bang Music. In 2024, he released his debut mixtape, titled MOTION, Jordan Darville of The Fader labeled it as a "is nitrous-boosted DMV mixtape". Later in 2024, he released Trappin' In Beverly, and Sorry Ma,. Also in 2024, he performed his track "Your Name" for On The Radar. In 2025, he released ROMANTIC TRAPPER, Fuck You Pay Me, and Rich Junkie. In 2026, he released his last project, titled How Life Been. In March, a month before his death, he released two YouTube-exclusive tracks, titled "Druggin N Thuggin", a remix of Kehlani's track "Folded".

Before his death, HavinMotion's Spotify page had 113,062 monthly listeners and 28,100 followers. (Note: While his monthly listeners and followers changed on Spotify following his death, during the time of source publications, it was at 113,062 monthly listeners and 28,100 followers.)

== Critical reception ==
On Pitchfork's weekly "Selects Playlist", Isaacs' track, “Tappin N Pacin,” was featured. Alphonse Pierre of Pitchfork labeled Isaacs' project Motion as one of his 13 favorite rap mixtapes of 2024. Isaacs' project Fuck You Pay Me was labeled as an "under the radar" project and that it should receive more notability for its fierce rapping style.

== Personal life ==
Isaacs had maintained a close relationship with Maryland rapper Nino Paid, where the two would do transactional business, as Isaacs would often ship pints of cough syrup and pharmaceutical drugs to the rapper.

== Death ==
On April 23, 2026, Isaacs was fatally shot at approximately 10:11 PM in Washington, D.C., and was pronounced dead 20 minutes later. His death was classified a homicide, and police offered a $25,000 reward for information leading to the arrest and conviction of those responsible.

== See also ==
- 2026 in hip-hop
- List of murdered hip-hop musicians
