= Sheng (musician) =

French rapper, singer, and musician

Camille Sheng Yi, or Sheng, is a French rapper, singer and musician born in Paris.

== Biography ==
Sheng is of Chinese origin through her mother and Lebanese through her father.

She discovered the world of rap at the university. She started writing, freestyling at parties and on social media. Drawn to the genre, she went into the studio to release her first single, Stupéfaite, followed by her first EP, Enfant Terrible, in 2022. Attached to her family heritage, Sheng sings in both French and Mandarin.

Deeply affected by the loss of her grandmother, this period of mourning led to the release of her second EP, Di Yu, in 2023. On February 7, 2025, she released her album J'suis pas celle, inspired by rap, hyperpop, and traditional Chinese music. Her track Benz is featured in the soundtrack of the video game FC 26.

== Discography ==
=== Albums ===
- 2025: J'suis pas celle
- 2025: J'suis (tjr) pas celle (réédition)

=== EP ===
- 2023: DI YU
- 2024: Tout va mal
