= J French =

American rapper, singer, and songwriter

- Born: Jamal Rashaad French; June 18, 1988 (age 37); Oklahoma City, Oklahoma, U.S.
- Origin: Oklahoma City, Oklahoma
- Genres: Hip hop
- Occupations: Rapper; Producer; Songwriter
- Instrument: Vocals
- Years active: 2015–present
- Labels: IVL ENT
- Website: jfrenchforever.com

Jamal Rashaad French (born June 18, 1988), known professionally as J French, is an American rapper, singer, and songwriter from Oklahoma. He released his first single, I Feel Like I'm On Dope, in September 2014. He is best known for his album JAGG (Just Another Gift From God) released in 2020.

== Career ==
Jamal French was born in Oklahoma City. He released his first album "Jaguar Jesus" in 2016. That same year he released singles "Medicine Ball" and "Dallas". In June 2018, J French received national attention for his single "God Given". "God Given" was also on J French's 2nd studio album "OGB" released earlier that year. In November 2018, J French gained local attention for his 3rd studio album "OGB 1.5". In 2019 gained local attention fore the release of the short film ONE POINT 5IVE. Later in 2019, J French released the single "Cut You Off" featuring notable Dallas rap artist Yella Beezy. J French's album "JAGG (Just Another Gift From God)" was released in August 2020. French appeared on Ted Talk in 2022 and secured sync deals with the Dallas Cowboys and NBA TV's Pass the Rock series. His latest EP, "I Don't Believe In Bad Days", featured the standout track "Able" and was released in 2025. His clothing line, Umbrella by J French, premiered in the Beverly Center (Los Angeles) in 2025.

== Discography ==
=== Albums and EPs ===
List of albums & eps, with selected details
Title	Details		
I Don't Believe in Bad Days	Released: May 2, 2025; Label: IV League Ent; Formats: Digital download	Jaguar Jesus	Released: December 19, 2016; Label: IV League Ent; Formats: Digital download
OGB	Released: January 19, 2018; Label: IV League Ent; Formats: Digital download		
OGB 1.5	Released: November 9, 2018; Label: IV League Ent; Formats: Digital download		
JAGG (Just Another Gift From God)	Released: August 21, 2020; Label: Ropeadope LLC; Formats: Digital download		

== Singles ==
List of singles, showing year released and album name
Title	Year	Album
"Feel Like I'm On Dope feat. Q French & D Money"	2014	Non-album single
"Medicine Ball feat. Huckwheat"	2016	Non-album single
"Dallas"	2016	Jaguar Jesus
"Late Nights"	2017	Non-album single
"Drive (El Diablo & Bionik Remix)"	2018	Non-album single
"Dallas Remix Feat. Flower Child & the Beatitdudes"	2018	Non-album single
"A Song For Kanye"	2018	Non-album single
"Letter to H.E.R."	2018	Non-album single
"Cut You Off feat. Yella Beezy"	2019	
