= Raf-Saperra =

- Born: Adeel Sardar Khan; Streatham Hill, London, United Kingdom
- Genres: Bhangra; UK garage; hip-hop; Qawwali; Rap; Afrobeats
- Occupations: Musician, songwriter, music video director
- Instruments: Dhol, tabla, harmonium
- Years active: 2021-present

Adeel Sardar Khan, known professionally as Raf-Saperra, is a British Punjabi singer known for producing Punjabi music. Saperra is known for combining modern hip-hop with Punjabi bhangra working along with aritsts such as Ghostface Killah from the Wu-Tang Clan , Dave East and Griselda Records' Conway The Machine and Benny The Butcher.

Saperra rose to fame in 2022 with the release of his single, "Modern Mirza," which was filmed in the Walled City of Lahore, revitalizing old Punjabi folk stories with a modern twist.

Saperra's music style involves a fusion of Bhangra, UK garage, Afrobeats, Qawwali, hip-hop, and Hindustani classical music.

== Early life ==
Saperra was born in Streatham Hill, London. Both of his parents are Punjabi Muslims who migrated to the United Kingdom from their ancestral homeland of Sargodha, Punjab, in Pakistan. Growing up, Saperra was influenced by both British and Punjabi music. He listened to rappers such as Giggs and Eminem, while also listening to Punjabi Bhangra-style artists such as Panjabi MC. Saperra also recalls that he was influenced by traditional qawwals such as Nusrat Fateh Ali Khan, alongside Bollywood music.

Saperra also began training in Hindustani music as a child, alongside studying a range of traditional Pakistani and South Asian musical instruments such as the dhol, tabla, and harmonium.

== Career ==
Saperra's professional music career began during the COVID-19 pandemic, when he posted clips of him singing traditional Punjabi folk songs on his Instagram, leading to a rise in popularity. Sidhu Moose Wala, a popular Punjabi rapper, messaged Saperra on Instagram and collaborated with Saperra in the former's music video: "Celebrity Killer."

Saperra released his first album, "Milli-1", in March 2021 with Sony Music India. He went on to release "Snake Charmer" with Sukshinder Shinda, popular Punjabi Bhangra singer-songwriter, in June 2021, leading to his rise in fame. In 2025, Saperra released the song "Jhaleya" with Dildar Hussain, a renowned tabla player who worked for Nusrat Fateh Ali Khan, for his album: "She Loves Me She Loves Me Not."
