= Iayze =

American rapper and singer (born 2003)

Jace!
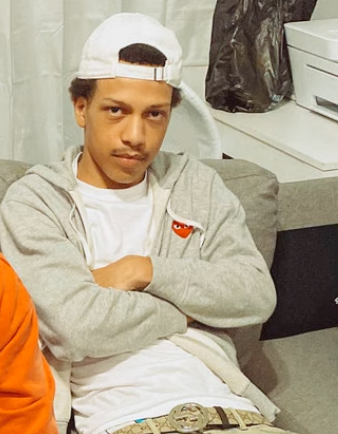
- Jace in 2023
- Born: Jace Lavoer Salter; January 10, 2003 (age 23); Fort Worth, Texas, U.S.
- Occupations: Rapper; singer; songwriter
- Years active: 2017–present
- Children: 4
- Musical career
- Also known as: Iayze
- Genres: Hip hop; plugg
- Labels: Geffen; Interscope; Simple Stupid Records

Jace Lavoer Salter (born January 10, 2003), known professionally as Jace (stylized as "Jace!", formerly known as "Iayze"), is an American rapper from Fort Worth, Texas. He is best known for his song "556 (Green Tip)" which received traction on TikTok due to its quite jaunty, old-fashioned instrumental paired with the modern/violent lyrics that he uses. He is currently independent.

== Career ==
=== Beginnings ===
Salter began recording music at age 13 and began releasing songs on YouTube under the alias "TGE Duwap", TGE standing for: Texas Gang Entertainment. He was inspired to start creating music after his friend, Almighty Jay convinced him to, for whom Salter was creating cover art at the time. Salter claims to only have started taking music seriously with the birth of his daughter, Ela.

=== 2021–2023: Breakthrough ===
In 2021, Salter started releasing multiple mixtapes and extended plays before gaining traction after his song "C'mere" went viral on YouTube and TikTok. In January 2022, he appeared on late rapper PnB Rock's mixtape SoundCloud Daze before releasing the track "556 (Green Tip)" the following month. The song also went viral on TikTok, with multiple jokes being made about its instrumental.

== Discography ==
=== Studio albums ===
List of studio albums, with selected details
Title	Album details
Virtuous	Released: March 2, 2022; Label: Simple Stupid, Geffen Records; Format: Digital download, streaming
Monarch 2	Released: January 11, 2023; Label: Simple Stupid, Geffen Records; Formats: Digital download, streaming
Reverence	Released: March 7, 2023; Label: Simple Stupid, Geffen Records, Top Kid Enterprise; Formats: Digital download, streaming
Reverence 2	Released: July 19, 2024; Label: Simple Stupid, Geffen Records, Top Kid Enterprise; Formats: Digital download, streaming

=== Mixtape ===
List of mixtapes, with selected details
Title	Mixtape details
Demons 2	Released: July 28, 2022; Deluxe released: September 21, 2022; Label: Simple Stupid, Geffen Records; Format: Digital download, streaming
