= Slimka =

Swiss rapper from Geneva

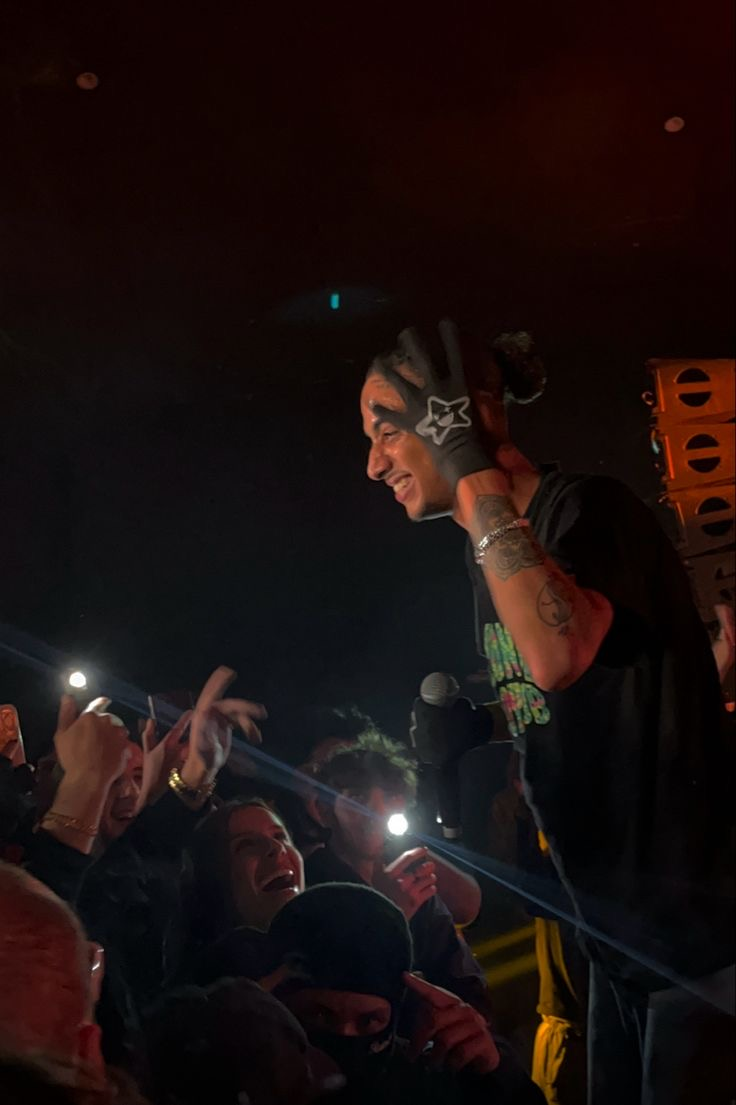
- Born: Cassim Sall; 30 April 1994 (age 32); Geneva, Switzerland
- Other names: George de la Dew; Slimka Kunta
- Occupations: Rapper; singer
- Years active: 2016–present
- Musical career
- Genres: Hip hop; Trap
- Instruments: Vocals
- Label: ColorsxStudios

Slimka (born Cassim Sall; 30 April 1994), is a Swiss rapper and singer. Born in Geneva, Switzerland to an Italian-German mother and a Senegalese-Malian father, he is considered one of the principal representatives of French Swiss rap along with his fellow rappers who form the Genevan Superwak Clique: Di-Meh, Makala and Varnish la Piscine. He credits Di-Meh and Makala for his continued enthusiasm in making music and cites them as his biggest motivators.

== Life ==
In his youth and throughout his adolescence, Cassim played soccer before later moving from sports towards focusing on modelling and rapping. Since 2014, he has done features alongside members of the Superwak Clique, a collective of Genevan hip-hop artists with two prominent members being Di-Meh and Makala. After these first song features, appearing in concert with the Superwak Clique, and on Makala's Varaignée, pt. 1 mixtape, he quickly cultivated his unique image and stood out for his unique voice and aggressive style of rapping. In April 2017, SLimka released his first project titled No Bad, Vol. 1. His mixtape did relatively well, reaching number 35 on the Schweizer Hitparade in the first week of its release. The following year, he released the second part of the mixtape No Bad, Vol. 2. The project could be considered a success for a rising artist as it brought the Superwak Clique to greater prominence in Switzerland and was 25th on the Schweizer Hitparade.

In 2020 he released the EP Tunnel Vision Prelude that, as its name indicates, precedes the release of his first album named Tunnel Vision. The promotion of the album began with the release of two singles, Headshot and Rainbow in early 2021.

== Discography ==
Albums

- Tunnel Vision (2021)

EPs

- Tunnel Vision Prelude (2020)
- 6KLOP EP (2022)

Mixtapes

- No Bad, Vol. 1 (2017)
- No Bad, Vol. 2 (2018)

Singles

- Depeche Mode(feat. Makala & Di-Meh) (2018)
- SupSup (2018)
- Icy Twice(feat. Unknown) (2018)
- A Plus, A Ciao (feat. Di-Meh) (2018)
- Slide (2020)
- Headshot (2021)
- Rainbow (2021)
- Pression (feat. Cali P, Riga, MYKEL COSTA) (2022)
- Level Up(feat. thaHomey) (2022)
- Best Life (2022)
