= Khantrast =

Chinese-American rapper and singer from New York (born 2003)

- Also known as: Starrk Khantrast
- Born: Anthony Zhang; December 17, 1998 (age 27); Brooklyn, New York, U.S.
- Origin: Brooklyn, New York, U.S.
- Genres: New York drill; hip hop; trap
- Occupations: Singer; songwriter; rapper
- Instrument: Vocals
- Years active: 2017–present
- Formerly of: TriKuza

Anthony Zhang (born 17 December 1998), known professionally as Khantrast is a Chinese-American rapper from Brooklyn, New York City, USA. With his first releases being posted on Soundcloud in 2017, Khantrast has since grown to be a prominent figure in the Asian-American rap scene.

== Life and career ==
Anthony Zhang was born in December 1998 in Brooklyn, New York, United States to Chinese immigrants. Zhang is fluent in Mandarin Chinese and features Chinese lyrics in some of his songs. Zhang first started releasing music under the name Starrk Khantrast in 2017 on SoundCloud. Zhang has repeatedly stated how important his parents' immigrant background and his identity as an Asian-American child of immigrants are to his music. When launching his 2025 tour "Chinatowns Favorite," he exclaimed, "This tour is for my parents — for every immigrant kid who sees themselves in my music."

As of 2026, Zhang is an independent artist and alludes to the fact that he's not "backed" by a major record label in some of his songs. His music has always been strongly influenced by New York drill music. Early on, Zhang's album and song titles, as well as the cover images, were heavily inspired by trends in the aesthetic rap community; With edgy or absurd titles and a lot of anime imagery and references, Zhang combined his characteristic voice with eye-catching titles and covers. The catchiness of his titles and, particularly, his music videos featuring scantily-clad anime girls became a staple of his early viral songs like She Bad (2022), "Let's Ride" (2022), and "Big Stunna" (2022), garnering millions of views on YouTube and getting millions of streams on music streaming platforms.

Since "Landed in Brooklyn" (2024), however, Zhang's style has shifted significantly, with many of his listeners jokingly commenting in surprise that this is "the same guy that used to sing about anime girls" on his newer works. Zhang features fewer samples in more recent releases, favoring original mixes, but has expressed that the Latin samples will return sometime in the future. Zhang is known for making lighthearted music about serious topics, such as his song "ADD" which addresses mental health, but mostly through the lens of attractive women still being attractive even if they are mentally ill. His most famous bars often feature controversial subjects and are beloved by his listeners, but have also come under significant scrutiny by outside observers.

=== Controversy ===
Zhang's 2024 hit single "Landed in Brooklyn" featured many bars that played off Zhang's Asian heritage, and as the song gained popularity, his lyrics ended up at the forefront of the discussion. Zhang had played with his immigrant background and identity in a manner which some argued fed into racist ideas; wearing straw hats while spitting bars that played off Asian stereotypes in America, and even using ethnic slurs at times, particularly the use of the word "chink"; but Zhang claims to have always been mindful of his roots ever since he first started recording. Others, however, have commended Zhang's controversial lyrics as a daring creative decision that had led to commercial success. Nonetheless, Zhang's relatively prominent position in the rap scene—compared to other Asian-American rappers—have gotten him accused of playing into a trend of behavior from Asian-American rappers in recent years.

== Discography ==
Cited from Apple Music.

=== Albums ===
- Chinatowns Favorite (2025)
- Poster Child (2026)

=== EPs ===
- Oppsmas (EP) (2022)
- Fake Love (EP) (2026)

=== Singles ===
- Alive (ft. Vic Rogue & Ozzy Thr33) (2017)
- Chun Li Remix (2018)
- Unkle Adam (2018)
- COOL KIDS (2018)
- mr popo (2019)
- Build with Me (2019)
- Virgin Friends (2019)
- Don't Hit My Phone (2019)
- CARTOON POISON (2019)
- List Of Regrets (2019)
- Toxic Love (2019)
- MY DATING PROFILE (2020)
- When The Car Won't Start (2020)
- Top 5 Favourite Chips (2020)
- Rap Conversation (2020)
- Best Pornstars Ever (2020)
- Flower Girl (2020)
- NARUTO BLUEBIRD FREESTYLE (2020)
- I Am a Simp (2020)
- D.K.C. (2020)
- BANJO FREESTYLE (2020)
- Jaslyn's Song (2020)
- Mind Woke (2020)
- Among Us Freestyle (2020)
- Buy Me the Ps5 (2020)
- 2d Girls (2020)
- Crush (2020)
- Jujutsu Kaisen Freestyle (2020)
- My Soldiers (2021)
- Kazekage (GAARA FREESTYLE) (2021)
- Naruto Theme Song Freestyle (2021)
- Stone Age (2021)
- SHARINGAN (2021)
- For the Boys (2021)
- Full Metal (2021)
- GROUND ZERO! (2021)
- Tsukuyomi (2021)
- Demon Slayer Freestyle (2021)
- Eight Gates Flow (2021)
- One Piece Freestyle (2021)
- Big Stunna (2021)
- Invincible Freestyle (2021)
- You Know (2021)
- So Wassup (2021)
- Switch (2021)
- When You Say Run (2021)
- Genies in Bottles (2021)
- Tokyo Manji (2021)
- Squid Game Freestyle (2021)
- I'm Toxic (2021)
- Bunny Thot (2021)
- Leave Me Alone (2021)
- Kage of Games (2021)
- She Bad (2022)
- Shush (2022)
- In the Family (2022)
- You Got Jokes (2022)
- First Date (2022)
- Tokyo Stick Up (2022)
- SLIDE (2022)
- Bounty (2022)
- Let's Ride (2022)
- Panic! (2022)
- Clear Skies (2022)
- Blocked Your Call (2022)
- Overdrive (2022)
- Monsoon (2022)
- Hot Dog Freestyle (Anthpo Hot Dog rap original) (2022)
- Cyberfreak (2022)
- Sike, I Lied (2022)
- HERMÈS BOX (2023)
- Obey (2023)
- Jump! (2023)
- For the Streets (2023)
- We'll get it Right (2023)
- SHISUI (2023)
- I'm leaving (2023)
- Cupid's Freestyle (Fifty Fifty Cupid rap) (2023)
- Kombat! (2023)
- Hollows (2023)
- Bad Man (2023)
- Barbie Freestyle (2023)
- Heart Attack (2023)
- King Kai (2023)
- SPECIAL GRADE DUO (TOJI DISS) (2023)
- Red Sand (2023)
- I Need Ya (2023)
- Sinner (2023)
- You Say You Love Me (2023)
- Chinatown (2023)
- Overthinking (2024)
- Sukuna Freestyle (2024)
- Ick List (2024)
- Pistol (2024)
- MASH (2024)
- DrillKage (2024)
- Oh We Know (2024)
- Succubus (2024)
- Landed in Brooklyn (2024)
- Where The Hoes (2024)
- Landed in Brooklyn - JADED Remix (2024)
- Valedictorian (2024)
- East Side Bop (2024)
- Genghis (2024)
- Landed in Brooklyn - Remix (ft. Kyle Richh) (2025)
- Man of the Year (2025)
- Great (2025)
- Where is the Bread (2025)
- Did It Again (2025)
- ADD (2025)
- Move It (Live "On The Radar" Performance) (2025)
- You The One (2025)
- Grimey Freestyle (2026)
- ADD - Remix (2026)
- Malfunction (2026)
- Lovesick (2026)
