= Songer =

British rapper from Reading

- Born: James Songer; 2000 or 2001 (age 25–26); Wokingham, Berkshire, England
- Occupations: Rapper; songwriter
- Years active: 2017–present
- Musical career
- Origin: Wokingham, Berkshire, England
- Genres: UK rap; Drum and Bass
- Label: Hard Reality
- Website: songer.co.uk

James Songer, known professionally as Songer, is a British rapper and songwriter from Wokingham, Berkshire, England, known for his highly lyrical, wordplay-heavy style and versatility across multiple genres, including UK Hip Hop, Drum and Bass, and UK Garage. He gained significant attention through viral freestyles on the popular UK platform BL@CKBOX and has since amassed millions of streams as an independent artist.

== Early life ==
Songer was born and grew up in Wokingham, a town just outside of Reading, England. Although his family had a love for music, with his grandfather having been in a band, he initially developed his interest in poetic expression and hip-hop, citing artists like Eminem and J. Cole as early influences. He began developing his rap skills by freestyling with friends during school breaks. After completing his A-Levels in Reading, Songer studied marketing at Bournemouth University.

== Career ==
His career breakthrough came in 2017 with his first appearance on the popular YouTube channel BL@CKBOX, a platform renowned for showcasing emerging UK talent. His performances on the platform became viral successes, with subsequent appearances being among the most watched in the platform's history.His freestyle known as "Toxic (Freestyle)," which uses the instrumental from Britney Spears' "Toxic," became particularly notable, eventually leading to a charting single release six years after the original freestyle.

At the age of 19 Songer released his first album, Dream Workz, with the title and album cover inspired by DreamWorks. The same year he co-created his label, Hard Reality, with Daneo. In 2023, Songer released SKALA, named after his dog.

== Musical style and themes ==
Songer is recognized for his complex, punchline-heavy lyricism and a strong emphasis on wordplay and storytelling. His work often delves into personal themes, including mental health, anxiety, and his daily life, a raw approach he has described as being his form of "therapy."

His versatility is a defining characteristic of his music. While rooted in UK Hip Hop, he frequently collaborates with artists across the UK's dance music scene over Drum and Bass and UK Garage beats. This fusion has helped him crossover into a wider audience within the UK music culture.

== Discography ==
Songer has released several album-length mixtapes as an independent artist, gaining substantial streaming success without major playlist support.

=== Albums ===
- Dream Workz (2019)
- Lyrics for Sanity (2020)
- The Sunrise Project (2021)
- Skala (2023)
- The Price of Therapy (2024)
- What If I Say No? (2026)

=== Notable singles and collaborations ===
Year	Title	Lead artist(s)	Notes
2021	"Balling"	Vibe Chemistry (feat. Songer, Mr Traumatik, Devilman & OneDa)	Drum and Bass collaboration.
2022	"Sleepwalking"	Issey Cross (feat. Songer)	Drum and Bass track.
2023	"Vino Bandit"	K Motionz, Songer	Jump-up Drum and Bass track, which utilizes a sample of "Together" by Ruff Sqwad.
2023	"Toxic (Freestyle)"	Songer	Charting single based on his viral BL@CKBOX freestyle.
2024	"04:59"	Songer (feat. D Double E)	UK Hip Hop track.
2025	"Under The Water"	Hybrid Minds, Songer	Drum and Bass track.

== Touring and live performances ==
Songer's success as an independent artist has translated into a strong live following. His debut UK tour sold out in a matter of hours, including multiple shows in London. He has also been a fixture at major music festivals, performing at events like Reading & Leeds Festival and Truck Festival.
