= Can't Go Broke =

2024 single by Zeddy Will featuring Babyfxce E

Single by Zeddy Will featuring Babyfxce E
- Released: July 5, 2024
- Genre: Hip-hop; trap
- Length: 2:17
- Label: Power Moves
- Songwriters: Zedekiah Williams; Efrem Blackwell
- Producer: Prod. by Depo + ProdByJ3WLZ

Zeddy Will singles chronology
"Lauren Hill Fire Freestyle" (2024)	"Can't Go Broke" (2024)	"All I Know (Remix)" (2024)

Babyfxce E singles chronology
"Certified Freak" (2024)	"Can't Go Broke" (2024)	"Get the Drop" (2024)

Remix cover
- Cover art of the official remix.

"Can't Go Broke" is a song by American rapper Zeddy Will featuring American rapper Babyfxce E, released on July 5, 2024. A sleeper hit, it went viral on the video-sharing app TikTok in June 2025, following which an official remix was released.

== Background and promotion ==
Zeddy Will has remixed popular sounds on TikTok. He created a bass-boosted version of "Can't Go Broke", which was shared in a snippet on TikTok by producer J3WLZ on June 18, 2025. It quickly gained significant attention on the platform, also sparking a dance to the song centering around the lines "You really good at everything but head, I don't want your throat / I don't want that shit / Matter fact, I want your friend, I'm allowed to switch". This version of the song was released to streaming services on June 27, 2025 as the official remix. According to Luminate, in the first full week after the remix was previewed on TikTok (June 20–26), the song increased from 19,000 to over 205,000 streams in the United States. In the week after the remix was released (June 27-July 3), "Can't Go Broke" amassed to over 1.82 million U.S. streams.

== Charts ==
Chart performance for "Can't Go Broke"
Chart (2025)	Peak position
US Bubbling Under Hot 100 (Billboard)	6
US Hot R&B/Hip-Hop Songs (Billboard)	27
