= Blow My High =

2025 song by Dee Mula

Single by Dee Mula

from the album Focus More On Me (Deluxe)
- Released: July 9, 2025
- Genre: Hip-hop
- Length: 2:29
- Label: N-Less
- Songwriters: Ladarius Odum; Matthew Taylor; Quinten Hofman; Sylvester Park
- Producers: Klutch Frenchie; Fuelz; Grabba

Music video
- "Blow My High" on YouTube

"Blow My High" is a song by American rapper Dee Mula from the deluxe edition of his album Focus More On Me (2025). It was re-released as a single by Island Records on July 9, 2025. It was produced by Klutch Frenchie, with co-production from Fuelz and Grabba. The song gained recognition on the video-sharing app TikTok and is considered his breakout hit.

== Background ==
When Dee Mula heard the beat for the song, he immediately started rapping. He considered it reminiscent of rapper Chief Keef's music, which motivated him to boost his performance. Although he was not particularly aiming to sound like Chief Keef, the song was later compared to Keef's style. In an interview with The Source, Dee Mula said:

The lyrics are extremely relatable and tell a story. I feel like every day, somebody wakes up and gets a phone call or a text that may disappoint or even feel like it's an attempt to tear them down. I'm saying you can't let these people get to you and ruin what you've got going on – whether that be your high or your motivation. The message still stands for people that don't get high too – don't "blow my drunk" either!

== TikTok virality ==
The song achieved widespread success on TikTok in mid-2025, and drew comparisons to Chief Keef, which contributed to its popularity. It has often soundtracked TikTok videos about frustration, especially in response to political news, with focus on the lyrics "baby, you gon' blow my high" from the chorus. By the end of July 2025, the song had been used in over 90,000 videos on the platform.

== Charts ==
=== Weekly charts ===
Weekly chart performance for "Blow My High"
Chart (2025)	Peak position
US Bubbling Under Hot 100 (Billboard)	3
US Hot R&B/Hip-Hop Songs (Billboard)	24

=== Year-end charts ===
Year-end chart performance for "Blow My High"
Chart (2025)	Position
US Hot R&B/Hip-Hop Songs (Billboard)	82
