= Mo Kolours =

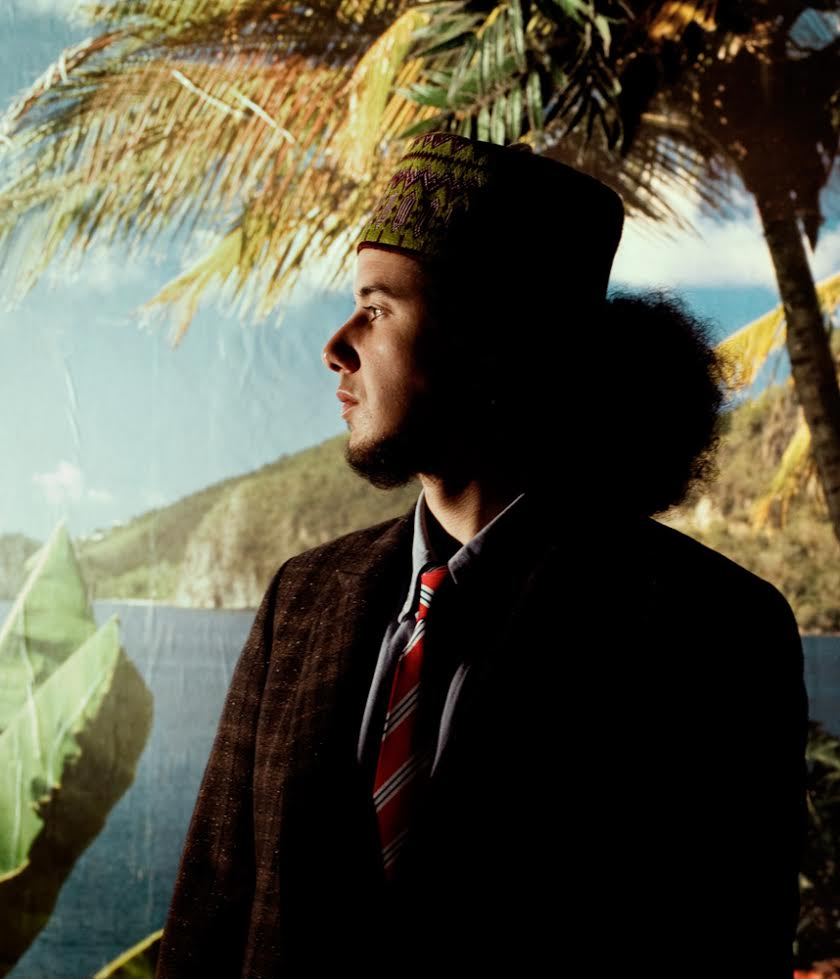

Background information
- Born: Joseph Deenmamode
- Origin: London, United Kingdom
- Genres: Hip-Hop, Jazz, Electronic, Funk, Soul, World
- Occupation(s): Vocalist, percussionist
- Labels: One-Handed Music

Joseph Deenmamode, known professionally as Mo Kolours, is a half-Mauritian, half-British music producer, percussionist, and vocalist. In 2014, he released his debut self-titled album on expanding independent label One-Handed Music, which was warmly received by critics. The Guardian described the record as a "feat", labelling it one of their "albums of the year". In March 2015, he released his latest EP, entitled How I (Rhythm Love Affair).

== Career ==
Mo Kolours draws on a wide range of musical influences and describes his use of percussion as "investigating rhythm in my own way." DJ Magazine described his sound as "part hip-hop, part funk, part dub, part electronic". The producer has spoken of his desire to unite similarities found amongst "bits of music all over the world", ranging from the traditional sega music of Mauritius (as introduced to him by his father) to modern hip-hop. Such eclecticism has led to comparisons to esteemed beat pioneer Madlib, whilst Resident Advisor claimed that "no-one sounds quite like Mo Kolours". In May 2011, he released the first of a trilogy of EPs for One-Handed Music; entitled EP1: Drum Talking. EP 2:Banana Wine (2012) and EP3:Tusk Dance (2013) followed respectively, and were generally well received by critics. Deenmamode's debut full-length release garnered further interest, with influential radio DJs such as Gilles Peterson and Benji B endorsing the record on their shows. In 2014, digital electronic music magazine Resident Advisor asked Mo Kolours to contribute to their prestigious online podcast stream. Following this, Deenmamode's most recent and fourth EP for One-Handed Music, How I (Rhythm Love Affair), was made available for download in March 2015. Pitchfork stated that while Mo Kolours' music has "a rich, minimalistic approach that grows more contagious as it plays" the record "lacked a strong anchor".

== Discography ==
=== Albums and LPs ===
- Mo Kolours (2014)
- Texture Like Sun (2015)
- Inner Symbols (2018)
- Original Flow: Chapter One (2023)
- Original Flow: Chapter Two (2024)

=== Singles and EPs ===
- EP1: Drum Talking (2011)
- EP2: Banana Wine (2012)
- Brave/Dredd Music (2012)
- EP3: Tusk Dance (2013)
- Don't Tell Me No Lies, The Whole Truth feat. Mo Kolours (2014)
- Untitled, Mo Kolours & R. O. Mamode IV (2014)
- Mike Black (John Wizards Remix) (2014)
- How I (Rhythm Love Affair) (2015)
- 93 (Unknown Release Date)
