= James Bernard (journalist) =

American music journalist (1965–c.2024)

Harold James Bernard (August 5, 1965 – c. March 2024) was an American music journalist.

== Biography ==
Bernard was born in Nashville on August 5, 1965. He received a bachelor's degree in public policy from Brown University in 1987. A graduate of Harvard Law School, he was a student journalist for the magazine The Source and eventually became its co-editor-in-chief, a role he held until 1994. Three years later, in 1997, he co-founded another magazine, XXL, alongside Reginald Dennis.

Writing for CounterPunch, Oklahoma State University academic Lawrence Ware says that Bernard "helped legitimize hip-hop to the world". Black Enterprise claims that his editing of The Source in the 1990s "showed how rap music sparked political commentary and cultural analysis, all while staying deeply connected to the culture".

Together with rock critic Dave Marsh, Bernard wrote The New Book of Rock Lists (LCCN 95-126352), publlshed in 1994. He also served on the Rock & Roll Hall of Fame nominating committee. Beginning in 2018, Bernard was a senior director for New York City's Department of Youth and Community Development.

Bernard was last seen alive on March 17, 2024, walking away from his Burlington, New Jersey, residence. His body was discovered by hunters in a wooded area of Pemberton Township, New Jersey, on December 29, 2025. The Burlington County Medical Examiner determined that Bernard had died of suicide around the time of his disappearance. He was 58.
