= Miles Minnick =

American rapper (born 1993)

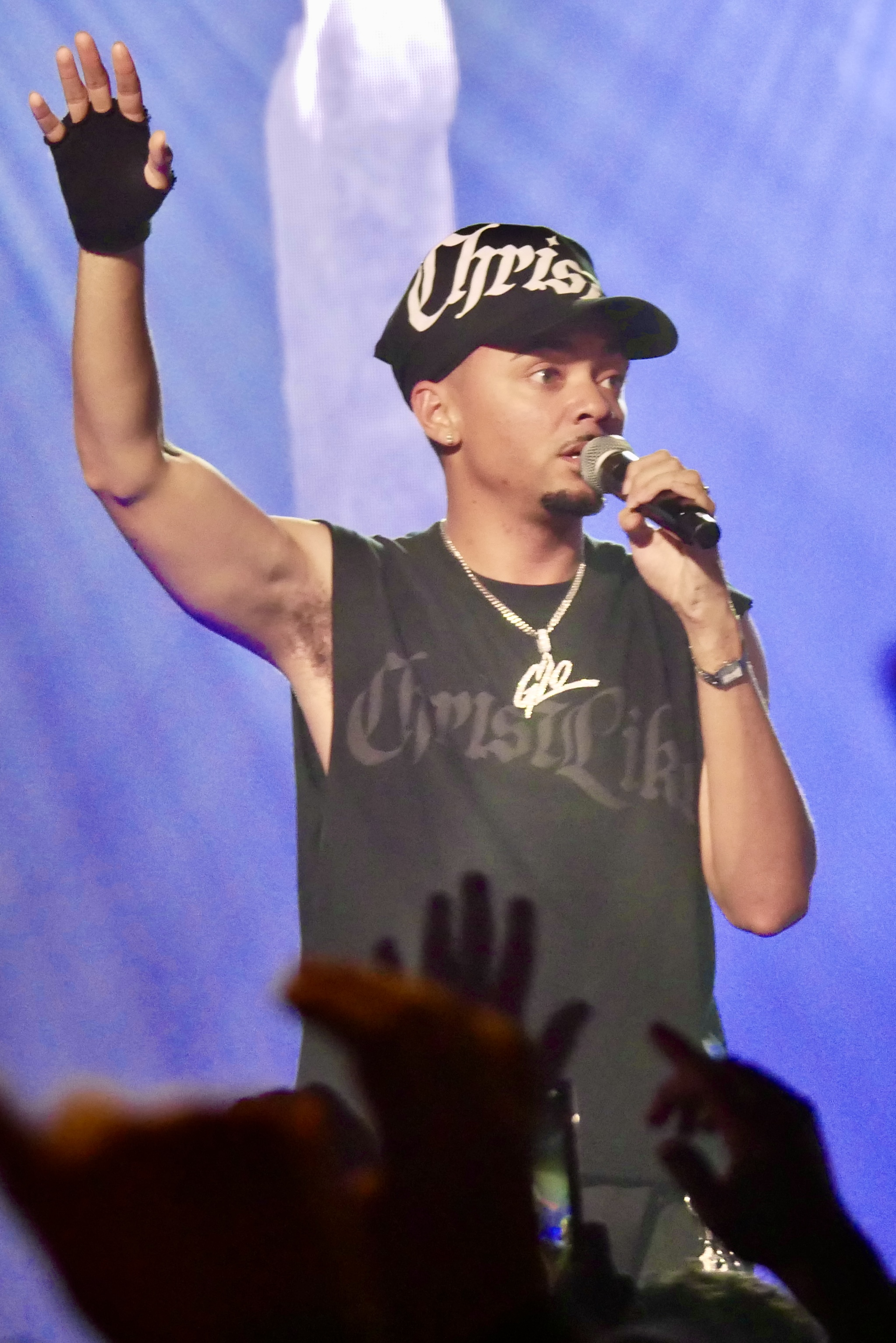
- Miles Minnick in 2025

Background information
- Born: Miles Tyrone Minnick; 1993 or 1994 (age 32–33)
- Origin: Pittsburg, California, U.S.
- Genres: Christian hip-hop; West Coast hip-hop
- Occupations: Rapper; actor
- Years active: 2013–present
- Label: Empire
- Website: milesminnick.com

Miles Tyrone Minnick is an American Christian rapper and actor from Pittsburg, California.

In 2025, he entered a joint partnership with Empire Distribution with the launch of his label imprint, Glo. The same year, he became the first solo Christian hip-hop artist to perform at Rolling Loud. He appeared in XXL magazine as part of their 2026 Freshman Class, and was nominated Best New Artist at the BET Awards 2026.

== Early life ==
Minnick grew up in Pittsburg, California, and began creating music at the age of 14. He entered the Bay Area rap scene in 2010 under the stage name Lil' Bailey.

== Artistry ==
Minnick has cited E-40, The HBK Gang, Nelly, Chris Brown, Iamsu!, Lecrae, Mac Dre, and Logic as influences on his music.

== Discography ==
=== Albums ===
==== Studio albums ====
List of albums, with year released
Title	Album details
Holographic	Released: November 11, 2022; Label: Glo / Empire; Format: Digital download, streaming
Christlike, California	Released: May 24, 2024; Label: Glo / Empire; Format: Digital download, streaming
Via Dolorosa	Released: August 29, 2025; Label: Glo / Empire; Format: Digital download, streaming

==== Collaborative albums ====
List of albums, with year released
Title	Album details
West Indies (with Jon Keith)	Released: February 28, 2025; Label: Alienz Alive; Format: Digital download, streaming
Get Well Soon! (with Lecrae)	Released: May 15, 2025; Label: Reach; Format: Digital download, streaming

=== EPs ===
List of EPs, with year released
Title	Album details
Somersville	Released: April 2, 2026; Label: Glo / Empire; Format: Digital download, streaming

=== Singles ===
List of singles, showing year released and album name
Title	Year	Album
"Second to None" (with Tauren Wells)	2025	Non-album singles
"Red and Gold Timin'" (with Bourne Blessed)	2026	Non-album singles
"It Come with The Game" (with LaRussell featuring ClayDough and Hokage Simon)	2026	Non-album singles
"Call Em'"	2026	Somersville
"Way I Live" (with Aha Gazelle)	2026	Somersville
"Where He At?" (with Lul DreDay)	2026	Somersville
"Everything on GLO" (with Tommy Zuko and CJ Emulous)	2026	Non-album singles
"Act Up" (with Dante' Pride)	2026	Non-album singles
"Day Ones" (with Brooke Valentine)	2026	Non-album singles

== Filmography ==
Year	Title	Role	Ref.
2013	Still Standing	Arthur	
2017	Guitar Man	Keaton	

== Awards and nominations ==
Award	Date of ceremony	Category	Result	Ref.
BET Awards	June 28, 2026	Best New Artist	Nominated	

== Tours ==
- New Mainstream Tour (2026)
