= Trap Dickey =

American rapper (born 1996)

- Dickey in 2026

Background information
- Born: Travis Dickey; 1995 or 1996 (age 30–31); Hartsville, South Carolina, U.S.
- Genre: Hip-hop
- Occupation: Rapper
- Years active: 2017–present
- Labels: Top Dawg; Uptown
- Website: trapdickeyofficial.com

Travis "Trap" Dickey is an American rapper from Hartsville, South Carolina. He gained traction with his 2023 single, "Blue Devils," with DaBaby featured on the remix. He is signed to Top Dawg Entertainment in partnership with 11 Music Group since 2026.

He appeared in XXL magazine as part of their 2026 Freshman Class.

== Early life ==
His mother was 15 when she gave birth to him, and his father died at 17. He lived with his grandparents, his grandfather working as a police officer.

At the age of 21, Dickey decided to pursue a rapping career ever since accidentally getting shot by his younger brother in a crossfire. He explained, "I already started recording [music]. But after I got shot, I started taking it serious. [...] because all the attention was on me. A lot of people can't say they know somebody that got shot in the face. I took full advantage and took rapping full-blown."

== Personal life ==
He has seven children with four women.

== Artistry ==
He has cited Meek Mill and Outkast as influences on his music.

== Discography ==
=== Mixtapes ===
List of mixtapes, with year released
Title	Album details
Trap or Die	Released: June 21, 2022; Label: 99 OVR; Format: Digital download, streaming
The Ville	Released: May 8, 2026; Label: Top Dawg, 11 Music; Format: Digital download, streaming

=== Singles ===
List of singles, showing year released and album name
Title	Year	Album
"Killin Em"	2025	Non-album singles
"Rich Right Now"	2025	Non-album singles
"Don't Trip"	2025	The Ville
"Swish"	2025	Non-album singles
"Trailer Park"	2025	Non-album singles
"Mike Beasley"	2025	Non-album singles
"In Dat Mode"	2025	Non-album singles
"Sunshine"	2025	Non-album singles
"Down South" (with Key Glock)	2026	The Ville
"Tell Me Why"	2026	The Ville
