= Sosocamo =

American rapper & singer (born 2002/03)

- Also known as: Camo
- Born: Cameron Sanders; 2002 or 2003 (age 23–24); Apex, North Carolina, U.S.
- Genres: Southern hip-hop; trap
- Occupations: Rapper; singer; songwriter
- Years active: 2021–present
- Label: Broke
- Website: www.sosocamo.com

Cameron Sanders, known professionally as sosocamo, is an American rapper, singer, and songwriter from Apex, North Carolina. He rose to prominence following the viral success of his single, "Keep Steady," and signed his first distribution deal with Broke Records.

He was listed among the "26 Rappers to Watch in 2026" by Complex. In June 2026, Sosocamo was featured on the cover of XXL as part of its annual Freshman Class list.

== Early life ==
Sanders was born and raised in Apex, North Carolina, the youngest of four children. As a child, he grew up in the church, and performed in its choir. He also learned the guitar, and experimented with the drums and the piano, where music was "a normal thing in the household".

Although his father was a record producer, Sanders was not allowed inside the studio. It was not until the age of 14 where he began recording music, naming his musical influences at the time to be Lil Uzi Vert, Travis Scott, and Future. He would also listen to Young Thug, Kendrick Lamar, and J. Cole. He began releasing music independently to the streaming service SoundCloud, and would meet his girlfriend and frequent collaborator Grayto at the age of 19.

== Artistry ==
Sosocamo's sound is characterized as melodic trap, compared to the likes of Future, Brent Faiyaz, and Pi'erre Bourne. He has cited gospel music, Kanye West, Future, and Young Thug as influences on his music.

== Discography ==
=== Studio albums ===
List of albums, with selected details
Title	Album details
No Service	Released: June 27, 2025; Label: Broke; Format: Digital download, streaming
Big Country	Released: February 27, 2026; Label: Broke; Format: Digital download, streaming

=== EPs ===
List of EPs, with selected details
Title	Album details
Screens (with Grayto)	Released: April 14, 2023; Label: Broke; Format: Digital download, streaming
Big Camo	Released: April 26, 2024; Label: Broke; Format: Digital download, streaming
Homesick	Released: June 26, 2026; Label: Broke; Format: Digital download, streaming

=== Singles ===
List of singles, showing year released and album name
Title	Year	Album
"Keep Steady"	2024	No Service and Big Country
"Want It All"	2024	Non-album singles
"Role Model"	2024	Non-album singles
"Soulless"	2025	No Service
"Narcotics"	2025	No Service
"There He Go"	2025	No Service
"Pogo"	2025	Non-album single
"200"	2025	Big Country
"Say Dat"	2025	Big Country
"Miss You Too"	2026	Non-album single

=== Soundtrack appearances ===
Title	Year	Album
"WYA" (with Russ)	2026	Goat soundtrack

=== Music videos ===
List of music videos, showing year released and director
Title	Year	Director(s)
"Vlone"	2022	
"Lotta Guap"	2023	Director Northside
"Hurry Up"	2024	Director Northside
"Keep Steady"	2024	Sosocamo and Grayto
"Soulless"	2025	Trent Jhanji
"There He Go"	2025	Keats
"Chronic"	2025	
"Don't Panic"	2025	
"Pogo"	2025	Haiko & Will Bloom
"200"	2025	Cyphr Studios
"Say Dat"	2025	Danny Kirchner
"Me & You" (featuring SoFaygo)	2026	Noah Keckler
"I Don't Mind"	2026	Keats + Tresco
"Favorite"	2026	Unified Atlantic

== Concert tours ==
- No Service Tour (2025)
- Big Country Tour (2026)
