= Babyfxce E =

American rapper

- Born: Efrem Jamaar Blackwell Jr. September 19, 2002 (age 24); Flint, Michigan, U.S.
- Genre: Hip-hop
- Occupation: Rapper
- Years active: 2020–present
- Label: Atlantic
- Website: babyfxcee.com

Efrem Jamaar Blackwell Jr. (born September 19, 2002), known professionally as Babyfxce E, is an American rapper from Flint, Michigan. He gained online traction with his 2022 single "Six Flags," and in 2024, secured a label contract with Atlantic Records. He released his debut album, Da Realest, in February 2026.

In 2026, he was named as one of the "15 Artists to Watch" by Billboard and one of "26 Rappers to Watch" by Complex. The same year, he appeared in XXL magazine as part of their 2026 Freshman Class.

== Early life ==
Blackwell grew up on the north side of Flint, Michigan with his mother and three siblings. Despite his parents being separated, he remains close with his father. He admitted that he didn't gravitate towards music until his early teens; around seventh grade, he started listening to Detroit rapper Cash Kidd. He'd compose lyrics in his notebook for fun, but never did anything with them. After graduating from Atherton High School, his friend urged him to step into the recording booth. At the positive reception, he began to take rapping seriously and released his debut single, "Invest," in 2021.

He opened for Babyface Ray, BabyTron, and Luh Tyler on their tours. He performed at Billboard House during SXSW 2026.

== Artistry ==
Blackwell has cited Lil Baby, YoungBoy Never Broke Again, NoCap, and Michigan rap as influences on his music.

== Discography ==
=== Studio albums ===
List of albums, with year released
Title	Album details
Da Realest	Released: February 20, 2026; Label: Atlantic; Format: Digital download, streaming

=== Mixtapes ===
List of mixtapes, with year released
Title	Album details
Life of The Reaper	Released: April 15, 2022; Label: Self-released; Format: Digital download, streaming
Its Wit a X	Released: September 18, 2022; Label: Self-released; Format: Digital download, streaming
The X Tape	Released: October 6, 2023; Label: Self-released; Format: Digital download, streaming
Real Striker Music	Released: November 22, 2024; Label: Atlantic; Format: Digital download, streaming
M Block	Released: March 28, 2025; Label: Atlantic; Format: Digital download, streaming

=== Singles ===
List of singles, showing year released and album name
Title	Year	Album
"Invest"	2021	Non-album singles
"Reaper"	2021	Non-album singles
"No Patience"	2021	Life of the Reaper
"Six Flags"	2022	Life of the Reaper
"D Rose"	2022	Its Wit a X
"Glock On Me"	2022	Non-album single
"Cut the Block Off"	2025	Da Realest
"What Bag I'm In"	2025	Da Realest
"You Know" (with 1up Tee)	2025	Non-album single
"Real Flex"	2025	Da Realest
"U Feel Me" (with Tay B)	2025	Non-album singles
"The Big 3" (with Rio da Yung OG and YN Jay)	2026	Non-album singles
"Grandma Baby" (with Black Fortune and Baby Kia)	2026	Non-album singles
"Activated" (with Baby Money)	2026	Non-album singles
"Street Love" (with Jontae)	2026	Non-album singles
"Bussin"	2026	Non-album singles

== Concert tours ==
- Da Realest Tour (2026)
