= Casper TNG =

Canadian rapper

- Born: Sharrieff Muhammad; Toronto, Ontario, Canada
- Genres: Hip-hop; R&B
- Occupation: Rapper
- Years active: 2014–present
- Label: Universal

Sharrieff Muhammad, known professionally as Casper TNG, is a Canadian rapper. His name is a moniker for Casper The Neighbourhood Ghost.

== Early life ==
Casper TNG is from Toronto and grew up in Regent Park and Alexandra Park. His mother is of mixed Spanish-Chilean and Black New Brunswicker descent, while his father has Bajan and German ancestry.

== Career ==
In 2015, at age 18, as an independent underground artist, Casper TNG released "Dope Boy", which is considered to be his breakthrough track. In 2017, he released the single "Know Me". Both songs have amassed tens of millions of streams. His 2021 single "Umbrellas" samples the Rihanna song "Umbrella". In 2022 he released the singles "Hard in the Paint" and "My Life".

In 2023, he entered a new chapter of his career by signing a distribution partnership with Streameum Entertainment. The deal marked the beginning of a long-term working relationship focused on expanding his catalog, increasing the reach of his music, and distribution of back catalogue across major streaming platforms.

In 2025, he released "The Market", featuring fellow Toronto rapper 100bandplan. The song peaked at number 61 on the Billboard Canadian Hot 100, was certified gold in Canada, and was "one of the year’s defining breakout records in Canadian hip-hop". In March 2026, Casper TNG signed with Universal Music Canada. Later that year, a remix of "The Market" featuring A Boogie Wit da Hoodie was released. In interviews following his signing, Muhammad stated that his time in prison and the experience of becoming a father to his daughter had fundamentally changed his perspective, causing him to distance himself from his past lifestyle to focus entirely on his music career. In 2026, he launched PuzzL Music Collective, a label in partnership with Universal Music Canada.

His debut album, Draft Day, was released on August 18, 2026, on Universal Music Canada, featuring the single "Trap 4 a Year II". On October 19 and 20, 2026, Casper TNG made his international debut, opening the first two London shows for J. Cole at The O2 Arena, after previously performing his song "The Market" alongside J. Cole onstage in Toronto.

== Personal life ==
Casper TNG has one daughter.

In 2017, Casper TNG was arrested and convicted on charges of firearms possession and drug trafficking, and given a two-year sentence. In May 2018, he and three others, including his brother, were arrested after a police chase in Downtown Toronto before which those in the car allegedly fired a gun at traffic while driving on Parliament Street. Casper TNG was given an 18-month sentence for the offense.

== Discography ==
=== Albums ===
List of studio albums, with selected details
Title	Release details
Draft Day	Released: August 18, 2026; Label: Universal; Formats: LP, CD, digital download, streaming

=== Singles ===
List of singles, showing year released, peak chart position and certifications
Title	Year	Peak chart positions	Certifications
Title	Year	CAN	Certifications
"Dope Boy" feat. Fresh	2014	—	MC: Gold
"Know Me"	2017	—	MC: Gold
"Brown Hunnids"	2017	—	MC: Gold
"Running Man" feat. RK	2017	—	MC: Gold
"Freeze" feat. Top 5	2017	—	MC: Gold
"Umbrellas"	2021	—	
"Hard in the Paint"	2022	—	
"My Life"	2022	—	
"The Market" w/100Bandplan	2025	61	MC: Platinum
"Helluvalife" feat. 100Bandplan	2025	—	
"The Market (Remix)" feat. 100Bandplan and A Boogie wit da Hoodie	2026	—	
"Trap 4 a Year II"	2026	—	
"—" denotes a recording that did not chart or was not released in that territory.
