= Lucki discography =

- Studio albums: 4
- EPs: 18
- Singles: 104
- Collaborative albums: 1
- Mixtapes: 5

The discography of American rapper Lucki (formerly known as Lucki Eck$), consists of 4 studio albums, 1 collaborative album, 18 extended plays, 5 mixtapes, and 104 singles.

== Studio albums ==
List of studio albums, with selected details and peak chart positions
Title	Album details	Peak chart positions	
Title	Album details	US	CAN
Flawless Like Me	Released: September 23, 2022; Label: Empire; Format: CD, LP, streaming, digital download	12	—
S*x M*ney Dr*gs	Released: July 7, 2023; Label: Empire; Format: LP, streaming, digital download	15	—
Gemini!	Released: June 14, 2024; Label: Empire; Format: Streaming, digital download	20	92
Dr*gs R Bad	Released: May 15, 2026; Label: Empire; Format: CD, LP, streaming, digital download	9	47
"—" denotes a recording that did not chart.

== Collaborative albums ==
List of collaborative albums, with selected details
Title	Album details
Wake Up Lucki (with F1lthy)	Released: December 3, 2021; Label: Empire; Format: Streaming

== Mixtapes ==
List of mixtapes, with selected details
Title	Mixtape details	Peak chart positions
Title	Mixtape details	US
Alternative Trap (as Lucki Eck$)	Released: July 25, 2013; Label: Self-released; Format: Streaming, digital download	—
Body High (as Lucki Eck$)	Released: August 7, 2014; Label: Self-released; Format: Streaming, digital download	—
X (as Lucki Eck$)	Released: May 30, 2015; Label: Self-released; Format: Streaming, digital download	—
Watch My Back	Released: May 5, 2017; Label: Self-released; Format: Streaming, digital download	—
Freewave 3	Released: February 14, 2019; Label: Self-released; Format: Streaming, digital download	—
Last Laugh (Archive Tape)	Released: October 16, 2026; Label: Empire; Format: Streaming, digital download	41

== Extended plays ==
List of extended plays, with selected details and chart positions
Title	Extended play details	Peak chart positions
Title	Extended play details	US
Freewave EP (as Lucki Eck$)	Released: October 19, 2015; Label: Self-released; Format: Streaming, digital download	—
Son of Sam	Released: March 22, 2016; Label: Self-released; Format: Streaming, digital download	—
Freewave II	Released: August 18, 2016; Label: Self-released; Format: Streaming, digital download	—
Days Be4 Storm	Released: April 14, 2017; Label: Self-released; Format: Streaming	—
Extra Lucky (with Brentrambo)	Released: May 9, 2017; Label: Self-released; Format: Streaming	—
NYC	Released: July 20, 2017; Label: Self-released; Format: Streaming	—
Days B4 II	Released: April 12, 2018; Label: Self-released; Format: Streaming, digital download	—
Hell Never Mattered (with Hotelroom)	Released: February 5, 2019; Label: Self-released; Format: Streaming, digital download	—
Extra Lucky 2 (with Brentrambo)	Released: May 4, 2019; Label: Self-released; Format: Streaming	—
Codeine in a Drought (with C Choppa)	Released: May 10, 2019; Label: ZCA Music; Format: Streaming, digital download	—
Days B4 III	Released: October 25, 2019; Label: Empire; Format: LP, streaming, digital download	188
IDGAF Days B4 May 30 :)	Released: May 26, 2020; Label: Self-released; Format: Streaming	—
Almost There	Released: May 29, 2020; Label: Empire; Format: LP, streaming, digital download	—
The World Is Lucki's	Released: December 11, 2020; Label: Empire; Format: Streaming	—
Almost Woke	Released: April 16, 2021; Label: Empire; Format: Streaming, digital download	—
2 Faced	Released: January 22, 2024; Label: Empire; Format: Streaming	—
2 Faced, Pt. 2	Released: May 31, 2024; Label: Empire; Format: Streaming, digital download	—
DaysB4Bad*	Released: May 1, 2026; Label: Empire; Format: Streaming, digital download	—
	"—" denotes a recording that did not chart.	

== Charted and certified singles ==
List of charted and certified singles, showing year released, certifications and album name
Title	Year	Peak chart positions	Certifications	Album
Title	Year	US Bub.	Certifications	Album
"4 the Betta"	2019	—	RIAA: Gold	Days B4 III
"Super Urus"	2022	—	RIAA: Gold	Flawless Like Me
"New Drank"	2022	—	RIAA: Platinum	Non-album singles
"Leave Her"	2023	—	RIAA: Gold	Non-album singles
"Roundtripski"	2026	2		Dr*gs R Bad

== Other charted and certified songs ==
Title	Year	Peak chart positions		Certifications	Album
Title	Year	US Bub.	US R&B/HH	Certifications	Album
"Randomly"	2019	—	—	RIAA: Platinum	Days B4 III
"Out My Way"	2019	—	—	RIAA: Gold	Freewave 3
"Kapitol Denim" (with Future)	2022	—	—	RIAA: Gold	Flawless Like Me
"2021 Vibes"	2023	—	46	RIAA: Gold	S*x M*ney Dr*gs
"RIP"	2024	—	—	RIAA: Gold	Gemini!
"No Stars in Maybachs" (with Rylo Rodriguez and Veeze)	2026	6	—		Dr*gs R Bad
"Can't B Trusted" (with Lil Baby)	2026	13	—		Dr*gs R Bad
"What It Is"	2026	—	48		Last Laugh (Archive Tape)
"All Wock"	2026	—	45		Last Laugh (Archive Tape)
"60 mgs"	2026	10	25		Last Laugh (Archive Tape)
"Overseas"	2026	—	36		Last Laugh (Archive Tape)

== Guest appearances ==
List of non-single guest appearances, with other performing artists, showing year released and album name
Title	Year	Artist(s)	Album
"Neptune Estate" (Remix)	2014	King Krule, Wiki	—N/a
"Preface"	2014	FKA Twigs	LP1
"Phone Sex"	2015	Robb Banks	Year of the Savage
"Superman"	2015	Louis M^ttrs	Slow Waves
"Keep That"	2016	Goodbye Tomorrow	Tunnel Stripe Exit Ramp
"Want From Me"	2017	UnoTheActivist	Whole Thang
"%%%%"	2017	Lil Tracy	Life of a Popstar
"Beam Me Up"	2018	Thouxanbanfauni	The Lost Files
"Coco"	2020	Lil Tracy	Designer Talk 2
"Space Boy"	2021	Manny Laurenko	Storm Coming
"Mona Lisa"	2021	Brentrambo	—N/a
"Back N Action"	2022	Babyface Ray	FACE (Deluxe Edition)
"GTA"	2022	DaeMoney	—N/a
"2k in the Soda"	2022	Internet Money	We All We Got
"##RR##EFG"	2022	Kankan	WAY2GEEKED
"Spill My Cup"	2022	Lil Double 0	Walk Down World
"Millions"	2023	Talibando, Veeze	War Lord
"Who Is That?"	2023	DaeMoney	Slae Season 3
"Die Die"	2023	Trippie Redd	Mansion Musik
"Broke Phone"	2023	Veeze	Ganger
"Coming Home"	2023	Benji Blue Bills	Campaign Blue
"Tired"	2023	Christ Dillinger, Joeyy, DJ Smokey	Year 2023 AD: Nukes Are Now Legal
"Jungle Juice"	2024	Lil Double 0, Lil Crix	Freebirdz
