= Michigan Boy Boat =

Mixtape by Lil Yachty
- Released: April 23, 2021
- Genre: Hip-hop
- Length: 40:16
- Label: Capitol; Motown; Quality Control
- Producer: 30 Roc; Buddah Bless; BSM Productions; Carlo; Enrgy Beats; Helluva; Reuel StopPlaying; Sav; Toju

Lil Yachty chronology
Lil Boat 3 (2020)	Michigan Boy Boat (2021)	Let's Start Here (2023)

Michigan Boy Boat is the third commercial mixtape by American rapper Lil Yachty. It was released on April 23, 2021, through Capitol Records, Motown Records, and Quality Control. The mixtape features guest appearances from Tee Grizzley, Veeze, Baby Smoove, Louie Ray, Swae Lee, RMC Mike, Icewear Vezzo, Rio da Yung OG, Babyface Ray, Sada Baby, BabyTron, KrispyLife Kidd, Slap Savage, and YN Jay. The production is handled by Helluva, Enrgy Beats, Sav, Buddah Bless, Carlo, Reuel StopPlaying, 30 Roc, Toju, and BSM Productions.

== Background ==
The mixtape is named after the state Michigan in the United States, with Lil Yachty describing it as a tribute for his "second home". Speaking on his collaborations with artists from Michigan in an interview with Eric Skelton of Complex on April 22, 2021, in which he thought about them as rapping "about all kinds of crazy shit" and described them as "mad fucking lyrical in a weird way" because "the schemes and the cadences and the flows are so unorthodox".

== Release and promotion ==
Lil Yachty released a song called "Cortex" as a trailer for the mixtape on April 19, 2021. He then revealed the title, cover art, and release date on April 21, 2021, tagging the featured artists on Instagram. The songs "Royal Rumble" and "Not Regular", respectively featuring KrispyLife Kidd, RMC Mike, Babyface Ray, Rio Da Yung OG, Icewear Vezzo, and Sada Baby, were released on October 20, 2020.

== Critical reception ==
Professional ratings
Aggregate scores
Source	Rating
AnyDecentMusic?	5.7/10
Metacritic	63/100
Review scores
Source	Rating
AllMusic	3/5 stars
Clash	7/10
Exclaim!	5/10
NME	3/5 stars
Pitchfork	6.8/10
Rolling Stone	3/5 stars

Michigan Boy Boat was met with generally favorable reviews. At Metacritic, which assigns a normalized rating out of 100 to reviews from professional publications, the mixtape received an average score of 63, based on six reviews. Aggregator AnyDecentMusic? gave it 5.7 out of 10, based on their assessment of the critical consensus.

Robin Murray of Clash praised the album, stating, "It's difficult to see Michigan Boy Boat winning over the doubts – sure, it's definite progression, but it feels more like a reinforcement of core values than an attempt to reach out". Alphonse Pierre of Pitchfork said, "For anyone searching for an entry point, it's a fun introduction to the fast-paced instrumentals, unpredictable flows, and demented punchlines synyonmous with Detroit and Flint". In a lukewarm review, AllMusic's Neil Z. Yeung wrote, "The set employs the unique, off-beat flow preferred by the Michigan underground, which Yachty adopts well enough on tracks like "Concrete Goonies" and "Final Form"". In a mixed review, NME's Kyann-Sian Williams stated: "Although the off-counter flow can get monotonous at times – unfortunately making a number of the tracks on Michigan Boy Boat rather skippable – Yachty's embrace of the Michigan scene here come across as a daring way of reinventing his once-bubbly rap aesthetic."

Danny Schwartz of Rolling Stone said, "Yachty is a great ambassador for Michigan rap, but as Michigan Boy Boat illustrates, he's far from the best practitioner of the style. He is the protagonist of the mixtape, but he isn't its anchor". Antoine-Samuel Mauffette Alavo of Exclaim! said, "The mixtape format may excuse the lack of sonic cohesion for the project, but it does not explain the faltering artistic direction that is more than likely to leave Yachty's fans disoriented and disenchanted".

== Track listing ==
Michigan Boy Boat track listing
No.	Title	Writer(s)	Producer(s)	Length
1.	"Final Form"	Miles McCollum; Martin McCurtis	Helluva	2:15
2.	"Dynamic Duo" (with Tee Grizzley)	McCollum; Terry Wallace, Jr.; McCurtis	Helluva	3:48
3.	"Concrete Goonies"	McCollum; Marlon Brown; Piero Umiliani	Enrgy Beats	2:08
4.	"Don't Even Bother" (featuring Veeze and Baby Smoove)	McCollum; Karon Vantrees; Jaelin Parker; Daniel Robinson, Jr.	Sav	2:36
5.	"G.I. Joe" (featuring Louie Ray)	McCollum; Orraccious "Louie Ray" Tucker-Brown; Tyron Douglas	Buddah Bless	2:47
6.	"Never Did Coke" (featuring Swae Lee)	McCollum; Khalif Brown; Robinson, Jr.	Sav	3:04
7.	"Ghetto Boy Shit" (featuring RMC Mike)	McCollum; Michael "RMC Mike" Smith, Jr.; Carlo Coxen II	Carlo	3:05
8.	"Plastic" (featuring Icewear Vezzo and Rio da Yung OG)	McCollum; Chivez Smith; Da'mario McCullough; Reul Walker; Robinson	Reuel StopPlaying	3:34
9.	"Fight Night Round 3" (featuring Babyface Ray and Veeze)	McCollum; Marcellus Register; Vantrees; Robinson, Jr.; Bill Conti	Sav	2:48
10.	"SB 2021" (featuring Sada Baby)	McCollum; Casada Sorrell; Coxen II	Carlo	2:57
11.	"Stunt Double" (featuring Rio da Yung OG)	McCollum; McCullough; Robinson, Jr.	Sav	2:03
12.	"SB5" (featuring Sada Baby)	McCollum; Sorrell; Samuel Gloade	30 Roc	3:04
13.	"Hybrid" (featuring BabyTron)	McCollum; James Johnson; Toritseju Agbeyegbe; Timothy Johns	Toju; BSM Productions	2:53
14.	"This That One" (featuring KrispyLife Kidd, Louie Ray, Slap Savage, Veeze, and YN Jay)	McCollum; Aaron "KrispyLife Kidd" Seymour; Tucker-Brown; Shannon "Slap Savage" Walker, Jr.; Vantrees; Jaylein Cantrell; M. Brown	Enrgy Beats	3:22
Total length:				40:16

== Personnel ==
Credits adapted from Tidal.

- Thomas Mann – mixing, studio personnel (all tracks)
- Colin Leonard – mastering, studio personnel (all tracks)
- Gentuar Memishi – recording, studio personnel (all tracks)
- Helluva – programming (tracks 1, 2)
- Enrgy Beats – programming (tracks 3, 14)
- Sav – programming (tracks 4, 6, 9, 11)
- Buddah Bless – programming (track 5)
- Carlo – programming (tracks 7, 10)
- Reul StopPlaying – programming (track 8)
- 30 Roc – programming (track 12)
- Toju – programming (track 12)
- BSM Productions – programming (track 13)

== Charts ==
Chart performance for Michigan Boy Boat
Chart (2021)	Peak position
US Billboard 200	39
US Top R&B/Hip-Hop Albums (Billboard)	21
