= 2 Sides of the Story =

Studio album by Sugarhill Ddot
- Released: August 2, 2024
- Genre: Hip-hop
- Labels: Proprity; UMG
- Producers: AyyoLucas; Blackwhite on the Beat; Dbtheproducer; Diamond Wav; Drew Bandz; Dson Beats; EliWTF; Exuising; G06 Beatz; Hector Soundz; Hitmaka; Olivia Lattore; Jake Falce; June The Genius; Kinderr; Kosfinger; L.3.G.I.O.N.; A Lau; Luca Beats; MCVertt; NDup Beats; PALMA; Quay Global; Scott Bridgeway; Shaman Beatz; SpanishKid; tthatsnasty; Vogo; WhoisWlcm; Yoshi (UK); Young T (Producer)

2 Sides of the Story is the debut studio album by American rapper Sugarhill Ddot. It was released on August 2, 2024 through Priority Records & UMG. It followed his extended play PSA, & His debut mixtape, 1st Side of the Story. The album features vocals from artists, Hunxho, the late PnB Rock, Skilla Baby, Star Bandz, BBG Steppa, and Luh Tyler. An deluxe edition was released on December 13, 2024, and featured 7 new tracks with a new vocals appearance from artists, Bay Swag & Wolfacejoeyy.

== Track listing ==
No.	Title	Writer(s)	Producer	Length
1.	"Can't Slip"	Sugarhill Ddot	Kinderr; L.3.G.I.O.N.	3:03
