= Ganger =

Ganger may refer to:

- The head of a gang of labourers, especially on canals
- The head of a gang of platelayers on railways
- Ganger (band), a Scottish alternative rock band
- Ganger (album), a 2023 album by Veeze
- A manufactured biological creature in the BBC Doctor Who universe
- Ganger, Karnal, a village in Haryana, India
- Ganger Rolf ASA, a Norwegian holding company for the Olsen family
- Gangers (film), a Tamil film directed by Sundar C

== See also ==
- Gengar, a Pokémon species
- Gengahr, an English rock band
