= Star Bandz =

American rapper and singer (born 2008)

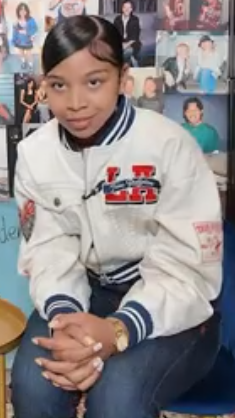
- In a 2025 interview

Background information
- Also known as: Star; Star Bandz; SB; Estrella
- Born: Star Ana Flowers; March 31, 2008 (age 18); Sauk Village, Illinois, U.S.
- Origin: Chicago, Illinois, U.S.
- Genres: Hip-hop; trap
- Occupations: Rapper; singer; songwriter
- Years active: 2021–present
- Labels: Priority; Capitol; Def Jam
- Website: officialstarbandz.com

Star Ana Flowers (born March 31, 2008), known professionally as Star Bandz, is an American rapper from Chicago. She gained widespread recognition after being featured on Sugarhill Ddot's single "My Baby", which went viral on TikTok. Her debut studio album Estrella was released in 2024. She later collaborated with drill rapper DD Osama.

== Career ==
Bandz's first track, "No Hook", was released on May 31, 2022. Later that year, she released her debut extended play, Big Bandz, in August. On May 5, 2023, Bandz dropped the single "Too Many Options", followed by "Not A Diss" in July. In December, she released "Bigger Better Badder", which coincidentally fell on Christmas Day. The single "Act Like You Kno" was released on January 1, 2024. Bandz followed up with "Yea Yea" on March 31. In September, Bandz was featured on New York rapper Sugarhill Ddot's song "My Baby". On October 4, 2024, Bandz released a remix of "Yea Yea" featuring Veeze. In November, she dropped "How The Game Go" ahead of her debut mixtape Estrella, which was released on November 15, 2024. The deluxe edition of Estrella was later released on March 28, 2025.

== Discography ==
=== EPs ===
- Big Bandz (2022)
- Star Bandz Where You Been? (2023)

=== Studio albums ===
- Estrella (2024)
- Estrella Deluxe (2025)

=== Singles ===
- "S*B" (2022)
- "Yea Yea" (with Veeze) (2024)
- "Energy" (with Sugarhill Ddot) (2024)
- "My Baby" (with Sugarhill Ddot) (2024)

== Tours ==
As a co-headliner

- The Worst Tour Ever (with Veeze) (2025)
- Luh Tyler: Mr Skii Tour (with Luh Tyler) (2024)

Tours with other artists and artists that she collaborated with

- New Wave Tour (with Sugarhill Ddot & DD Osama) (2025)
