= YN Jay =

American rapper (born 1999)

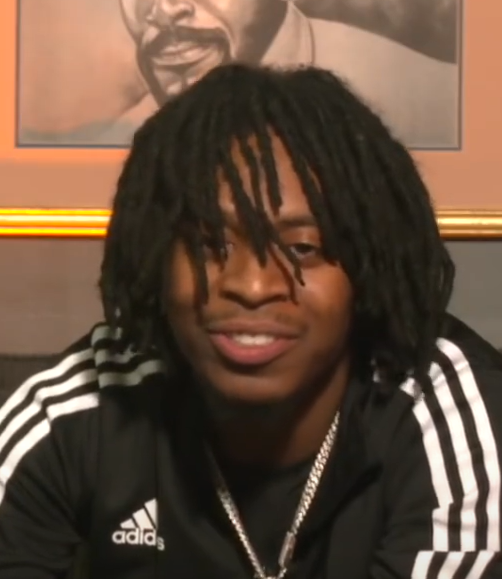
- YN Jay in 2022

Background information
- Also known as: Coochie Man
- Born: July 23, 1999 (age 27); Flint, Michigan, U.S.
- Origin: Beecher, Michigan, U.S.
- Genres: Hip hop; comedy hip hop
- Occupations: Rapper, songwriter
- Years active: 2019–present
- Labels: Dreamchasers Records; Alamo

Jaylein Arthur-Henry Cantrell, known professionally as YN Jay, is an American rapper from Beecher, Michigan. After releasing his debut mixtape MVP in 2019, his song "Coochie" went viral on social media in 2020. His first two studio albums, Ninja Warrior and Coochie Chronicles, were released in 2021 through Alamo Records.

== Early life ==
Jay was raised in Beecher, Michigan, and had one older brother, Gabe, who inspired Jay to start rapping at age 10. As a teenager, he recorded eight to 10 songs a day, and started rapping as a career after his brother died.

== Career ==
In November 2019, he released his debut mixtape MVP. He released the single "Coochie" with Louie Ray in April 2020, which went viral on YouTube and other social media platforms. He released the single "Gotta Get Rich" in July 2020. His mixtapes Coochie Land and Watch This were released in 2020, in August and September, respectively. His single "Blind 'Em" with Lil Yachty was released in September 2020, and his single "Doonie Van" was released in October 2020.

Jay released his debut studio album, Ninja Warrior, in January 2021 through Alamo Records. He was featured on Lil Yachty's song "Flintana" from his mixtape Michigan Boy Boat in April 2021. His song "Triple S" went viral on TikTok, and a remix of the song featuring Coi Leray was released in June 2021. Jay was featured on Mace Supreme's song "Jumanji" that same month. His second studio album, Coochie Chronicles, was released in July 2021. He released the single "Lamar" in November 2021.

== Artistry ==
Jay's music has been described as hip hop and trap. Alphonse Pierre of Pitchfork wrote, "YN Jay endlessly recycles his own lyrics and big brr somehow keeps coming up with something new." Neena Rouhani of Billboard called Jay a "Detroit favorite", while Entertainment Weekly's Eli Enis called Jay one of "the most prolific voices from Michigan's fertile rap scene". In 2021, XXL included the music video for "Coochie" on their list of the funniest hip-hop music videos of the prior five years. Jay refers to himself as the "Coochie Man".

== Discography ==
=== Studio albums ===
List of studio albums with details
Title	Details
Ninja Warrior	Released: January 20, 2021; Label: Alamo; Format: Digital download, streaming
Coochie Chronicles	Released: July 16, 2021; Label: Alamo; Format: Digital download, streaming

=== Mixtapes ===
List of mixtape albums with details
Title	Details
MVP	Released: November 28, 2019; Label: Self-released; Format: Digital download, streaming
Coochie Land	Released: August 3, 2020; Label: Foundation; Format: Digital download, streaming
Watch This	Released: September 11, 2020; Label: Foundation; Format: Digital download, streaming
The Scouts (with Louie Ray)	Released: October 31, 2020; Label: Self-released; Format: Digital download, streaming

=== Singles ===
==== As lead artist ====
List of singles as lead artist with title, year, and album
Title	Year	Album
"Another Day"	2019	MVP
"Thank Me Later"	2020	Coochie Land
"Mannnnn"	2020	Non-album single
"Surprise"	2020	Coochie Land
"Coochie Man"	2020	Coochie Land
"Gotta Get Rich"	2020	Coochie Land
"Club Banger"	2020	Non-album single
"Dookie Shoe" (featuring Lil Yachty)	2020	Non-album single
"Coochie" (featuring Louie Ray)	2020	Coochie Chronicles
"Coochie Vibes"	2020	Non-album single
"Reflection"	2020	Non-album single
"Autograph" (with Icewear Vezzo)	2020	Non-album single
"Coochie Man, Pt. 2"	2020	Watch This
"Triple S" (with Louie Jay or remix featuring Coi Leray)	2020	Coochie Chronicles
"Face It"	2020	Non-album single
"Coochie World"	2020	Coochie Land
"Biggest Fan"	2020	Coochie Land
"Round One" (with Curt Green)	2020	Non-album singles
"Thick with No Ass" (featuring RMC Mike)	2020	Coochie Land
"Pay Me Back" (with Louie Ray)	2020	Non-album singles
"Doonie Van"	2020	Coochie Land
"Ahhhhh"	2020	Coochie Land
"Wakeisha" (featuring Grindhard E)	2020	Coochie Land
"Coochie Hoochie" (with Young Lawless)	2020	Non-album single
"Im a Boss" (with Louie Ray)	2020	Non-album single
"Dog Shit"	2020	Ninja Warrior
"Steal My Groove"	2020	Ninja Warrior
"Hahaha" (featuring Lil Yachty)	2020	Ninja Warrior
"Las Vegas"	2021	Non-album single
"Smoove Back (Austin Powers Remix)"	2021	Non-album single
"Coochie in Class"	2021	Non-album single
"Coochie Growl" (featuring Rio Da Young OG)	2021	Non-album single
"Coochie Dance" (with No Good Ent, President Bandz, and Mari Peso)	2021	Non-album single
"Night Time"	2021	Non-album single
"Yeessiirrrr"	2021	Non-album single
"Drunk When I Made This"	2021	Non-album single
"Coochie Language"	2021	Non-album single
"Jumanji" (with Mace Supreme)	2021	Non-album single
"Oxyyyyy"	2021	Coochie Chronicles
"Coochie Throbbin" (with Hunned Yearz)	2021	Non-album single
"22 Seconds" (with Bigjp)	2021	Non-album single
"Grab Brunch" (with Dean Jones)	2021	Non-album single

==== As featured artist ====
List of singles as featured artist with title, year, and album
Title	Year	Album
"Balla Blockin'" (Hunna Grann featuring YN Jay)	2020	Back for Revenge 2
"Girl Scout Cookies" (DTC Vibe featuring YN Jay)	2020	Non-album single
"Stop That" (Wheat Gwopo and SV Slugg featuring YN Jay)	2020	Non-album single
"Act Out" (It's Don featuring YN Jay)	2020	Frequent Fly N***a
"Talkin Spicy" (Nasa9x featuring YN Jay)	2020	Missions
"Coochie Slide" (Josh Stiffy featuring YN Jay)	2021	Non-album singles
"Tweak wit Me" (GMO Stax featuring YN Jay)		Non-album singles
"Different Personalities" (Slidegang Dyce featuring YN Jay)		Non-album singles
"Collins" (Leek Mula featuring YN Jay)		Non-album singles
"Slam It" (Esei featuring YN Jay)		Non-album singles
"Last Night" (YN Que featuring YN Jay)		Non-album singles
"So Much Pain" (D. Poe featuring YN Jay and RMC Mike)		Non-album singles
"Million" (D. Poe featuring YN Jay)		Non-album singles
"FreeRio Blya" (OG Buda featuring YN Jay)	2022	FreeRio 2
"Work For this Dolla" (Young Porter featuring YN Jay)	2022	Non-album single
"No Ne Ya" (Soda Luv featuring YN Jay)	2023	Nichego Lichnogo 2
"Bad Bitches" (Tony Stogie featuring YN Jay and KrispyLife Kidd)	2024	Wall St
"Teach You" (Tony Stogie featuring YN Jay and KrispyLife Kidd)	2026	Prince of the Pint
"Prince of the Cup" (Tony Stogie featuring YN Jay and RMC Mike)	2026	Prince of the Pint
"Canada Goose" (Tony Stogie featuring YN Jay and Rio Da Yung Og)	2026	Prince of the Pint
