= Sorry Not Sorry =

The slang phrase sorry not sorry refers sarcastically to a non-apology.

The title Sorry Not Sorry may refer to:

== Music ==
- "Sorry Not Sorry" (Bryson Tiller song), 2016
- "Sorry Not Sorry" (Demi Lovato song), 2017
- "Sorry Not Sorry" (DJ Khaled song), 2021
- "Sorry Not Sorry" (Lil Yachty and Veeze song), 2024
- "Sorry Not Sorry" (Tyler, the Creator song), 2023
- "Sorry, Not Sorry", a song by American rock band Mayday Parade's from the 2013 album Monsters in the Closet
- "Sorry Not Sorry", a single by American alternative metal band Gemini Syndrome from the 2016 album, Memento Mori

== Film and television ==
- Sorry/Not Sorry (film), a 2023 documentary
- "Sorry Not Sorry" (The Simpsons), a 2020 episode of The Simpsons
- Sorry Not Sorry (TV series), a South Korean television romance comedy drama

== Other uses ==
- Sorry Not Sorry: Dreams, Mistakes, and Growing Up, a 2016 memoir by Naya Rivera
- Sorry Not Sorry, a podcast hosted by American actress and activist Alyssa Milano
- Sorry (Beyoncé song), which repeatedly features the phrase "Sorry, I ain't sorry"
