= Almost There =

Almost There may refer to:

- Almost There (film), a 2014 independent documentary film
- Almost There (MercyMe album), 2001
- Almost There (The Academy Is... album), 2026
- "Almost There" (Andy Williams song) (1964), also covered by Brenda Lee
- "Almost There" (The Princess and the Frog song) (2009)
- Almost There (EP), a 2020 EP by Lucki
- "Almost There", a song by Ab-Soul from the album Longterm Mentality (2011)
