= Ganger (album) =

Studio album by Veeze
- Released: June 27, 2023
- Genre: Hip hop
- Length: 59:20
- Label: Navy Wavy; Warner

Veeze chronology
| Navy Wavy (2019) | Ganger (2023) |

Ganger is the debut studio album by American rapper Veeze, released on June 27, 2023, through Navy Wavy and Warner Records. It follows his 2019 debut mixtape Navy Wavy and features collaborations with Lucki, Babyface Ray, Icewear Vezzo, Lil Yachty, and Lil Uzi Vert. The album received acclaim from critics, several of whom ranked it as one of the best albums of the year. It peaked at number 97 on the US Billboard 200.

== Critical reception ==
Professional ratings
Review scores
| Source | Rating |
|---|---|
| AllMusic | 3/5 stars |
| HipHopDX | 4.5/5 |
| Pitchfork | 8.0/10 |

Matthew Ritchie of Pitchfork wrote that Veeze "wield[s] vocal oddities and chuckle-inducing, stream-of-consciousness bars" and "oscillates between laid-back joints fit for an evening smoke session (the penultimate 'Tony Hawk' and dreamy 'Safe 2') and boisterous, percussive beats that could soundtrack a late-night car chase ('OverseasBaller')". Reviewing the album for HipHopDX, Yousef Srour noted that "at no point on Ganger [...] does he lend himself to any singular subgenre, theme, or era within Hip Hop", describing it as a "drug-induced coma of shit-talking, flexing, reflections on an assortment of lovers, and babbles of unusually mundane banter with Lil Uzi Vert". AllMusic's Fred Simpson felt that "Veeze's entire style seems to be centered around trying hard to sound unfazed, yet he does appear to be putting effort into his witty rhymes and clever pop culture references. His delivery on Ganger is even more mush-mouthed than it was before, but it fits the syrupy, not-quite-trap beats".

Ganger on year-end lists
| Publication | Accolade | Rank |
|---|---|---|
| Complex | The Best Albums of 2023 | 16 |
| The Fader | The 50 Best Albums of 2023 | 20 |
| Pitchfork | The 50 Best Albums of 2023 | 35 |
| Rolling Stone | The 100 Best Albums of 2023 | 39 |
| Stereogum | The 50 Best Albums of 2023 | 33 |
| The Washington Post | Best Albums of 2023 | 2 |
| Pitchfork | The 100 Best Albums of the 2020s So Far (2024) | 6 |

== Track listing ==
Ganger track listing
| No. | Title | Length |
|---|---|---|
| 1. | "Not a Drill" | 3:44 |
| 2. | "OverseasBaller" | 2:10 |
| 3. | "No Sir Ski" | 2:20 |
| 4. | "You Know I" | 2:16 |
| 5. | "GOMD" | 2:51 |
| 6. | "Sexy Liar" | 2:20 |
| 7. | "Broke Phone" (featuring Lucki) | 3:28 |
| 8. | "7sixers" (featuring Babyface Ray and Icewear Vezzo) | 3:00 |
| 9. | "Robert de Niro" | 3:03 |
| 10. | "Boat Interlude" (featuring Lil Yachty) | 2:37 |
| 11. | "Tramp Stamp" | 2:32 |
| 12. | "Weekend" | 2:38 |
| 13. | "Kinda $" | 2:53 |
| 14. | "GAIG" | 2:59 |
| 15. | "Whoda1" | 3:32 |
| 16. | "Unreleased Leak" | 3:33 |
| 17. | "Lick" | 2:13 |
| 18. | "Safe 2" | 2:31 |
| 19. | "Gangermatic" | 2:35 |
| 20. | "Tony Hawk" | 1:29 |
| 21. | "GOMD" (featuring Lil Uzi Vert; remix) | 4:36 |
| Total length: | | 59:20 |

Ganger deluxe tracks
| No. | Title | Length |
|---|---|---|
| 1. | "Get Lucki" | 2:59 |
| 2. | "Rich No Duh" | 2:18 |
| 3. | "Luv the Tour" | 2:23 |
| 4. | "Rich Rockstar" | 2:10 |
| 5. | "Amusing" | 2:39 |
| Total length: | | 71:49 |

Notes

- The deluxe edition adds the five additional tracks as the first five, moving the original 21 tracks from 6–26.
- "You Know I" contains a sample of "Thuggish Ruggish Bone", written by Anthony Henderson, Stanley Howse, Bryon McCane, Kenneth McCloud, Steven Howse, Tim Middleton, and Charles Scruggs, as performed by Bone-Thugs-N-Harmony.
- "Sexy Liar" features uncredited vocals from Lil Uzi Vert.
- "You Know I" is stylized as "You know i".
- "Sexy Liar" is stylized as "SEXY liar".
- "Broke Phone" is stylized as "Broke phone".
- "Tramp Stamp" is stylized as "tramp Stamp".
- "Whoda1" is stylized as "WHOda1".
- "Unreleased Leak" is stylized as "Unreleased leak".
- "Lick" is stylized in all caps.

== Charts ==
Chart performance for Ganger
| Chart (2023) | Peak position |
|---|---|
| US Billboard 200 | 97 |
| US Top R&B/Hip-Hop Albums (Billboard) | 41 |
