= DDOT =

DDOT may refer to:

== Letters ==
- Ḋ, the letter D with dot above
- Ḍ, the letter D with dot below

== People ==
- D-Dot (born 1968), American hip-hop producer
- Sugarhill Ddot (born 2008), American drill rapper

== Transportation ==
- Detroit Department of Transportation, in Detroit, Michigan
- District Department of Transportation, in Washington, DC
