= Gemini! =

Studio album by Lucki
- Released: June 14, 2024
- Genre: Hip-hop
- Length: 50:41
- Label: Empire

Lucki chronology
S*x M*ney Dr*gs (2023)	Gemini! (2024)	Dr*gs R Bad (2026)

Singles from Gemini!
- 1. "All Love" Released: March 22, 2024; 2. "Heavy On My Heart" Released: May 31, 2024; 3. "Courtesy Of" Released: May 31, 2024

Gemini! (stylized as GEMINI!) is the third studio album by Chicago-based rapper Lucki, released under Empire, on June 14, 2024. It features contributions by Lil Yachty, Rylo Rodriguez, Veeze, Future, and 42 Dugg, on a 20-song tracklist.

== Reception ==
Elaina Bernstein of Hypebeast said the album had the "signature hazy, hypnotic flow" of Lucki and "reaffirmed the underground rapper’s spot in the mainstream rap space".

Clash described Gemini!'s release that "continue to elevate his confessional cloud rap style over production from the likes of Tay Keith, Wheezy, Southside and Bobby Raps".

Coog Radio praised Gemini! as an album which "masterfully balances strong beats and compelling lyrics, creating a sweet dance that amplifies both elements".

Professional ratings
Review scores
Source	Rating
AllMusic	3/5 stars

== Track listing ==
Gemini! Track Listing
No.	Title	Producer(s)	Length
1.	"On They Way"	CGM; CXDY	2:16
2.	"Courtesy Of"	Brent Rambo; SG1	2:27
3.	"Cta 2 Bach"	Bhristo	2:21
4.	"All Love"	Brent Rambo; Kloudbwwoy	2:03
5.	"Biggavel" (with Lil Yachty)	Childboy; Rio Leyva	2:50
6.	"Gerskiway" (with Rylo Rodriguez and Veeze)	Yung Icey	2:28
7.	"Brazy For Real"	Bhristo; Kavi	2:16
8.	"Exotic"	Bhristo; Kavi	2:13
9.	"Baby Goat" (with Future)	Bhristo; Bobby Raps; Vendr	4:10
10.	"Kylie"	AR; Bhristo; Bobby Raps; Brent Rambo; Mayday	2:25
11.	"Dotted Line"	Bhristo; Bobby Raps	2:09
12.	"Signed Up"	Yung Icey	2:01
13.	"Twin Flow" (with Veeze)	Mayday; Yung Icey	2:10
14.	"3 Summers Straight" (with Rylo Rodriguez and 42 Dugg)	Othello Beats; Texaco	2:22
15.	"X6"	Tye Beats; ky.roseland	2:02
16.	"Hustler Muzik"	Brent Rambo; HITMULA	2:01
17.	"Heavy On My Heart"	Coupe	2:42
18.	"Ski What It Be"	JAYMEWORLD; Vxsma	2:15
19.	"RIP"	Bhristo	2:03
20.	"Outro"	Brent Rambo; SG1; Twizz Production; Yung Icey	5:26
Total length:			51:40

Notes

- "Cta 2 Bach" is stylized as "CTA 2 Bach".
- "Brazy For Real" is stylized as "BRAZY4real".
- "Baby Goat" is stylized as "BBY GOAT".
- "3 Summers Straight" is stylized as "3 SMRS STR8".
- "Biggavel", "Exotic", "Signed Up", "Twin Flow", "Hustler Muzik", and "Outro" are all stylized in all caps.
- "Outro" features uncredited vocals from Veeze.

== Charts ==
Chart performance for Gemini!
Chart (2024)	Peak position
US Billboard 200	20
