= Baby Smoove =

American rapper (born 1996)

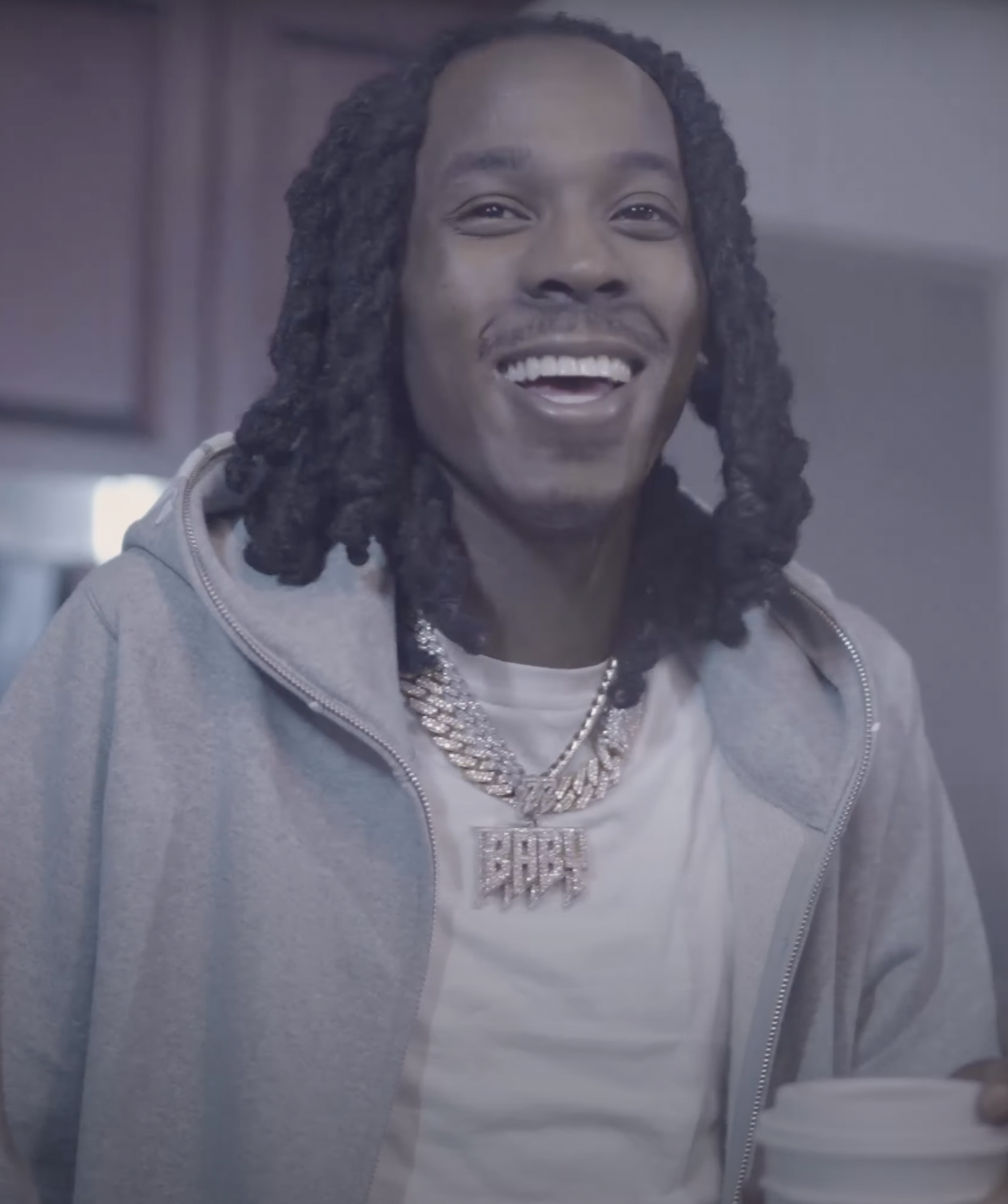
- Baby Smoove in 2021

Background information
- Also known as: Bandcrew Smoove
- Born: Jaelin Deanta Parker; December 3, 1996 (age 29)
- Origin: Detroit, Michigan
- Genre: Hip hop
- Occupations: Rapper; singer
- Instrument: Vocals

Jaelin Deanta Parker (born December 3, 1996), known professionally as Baby Smoove, is an American rapper and singer from Detroit, Michigan. He is noted by Ben Dandridge-Lemco of The Fader for his "slick one-liners and clever storytelling delivered in a subdued, almost disinterested, flow."

== Early life ==
Jaelin Parker was born December 3, 1996, and raised on the east side of Detroit, Michigan. He recalls growing up in a poorer neighborhood of Detroit and wishing to be suburban. He also recalls skipping school and not socializing a lot when younger. He graduated from High School in 2014.

== Career ==
Smoove recalls recording in a studio for the first time at age 15. In 2018, he created a CD mixtape titled Why so Serious which he recalls not gaining attention. In 2019, he released his single "CardoGotWings" on streaming platform SoundCloud which garnered attention from online music publication Pitchfork who selected the song as "The must-hear rap song of the day". In July 2020, Smoove released his project I'm Still Perfect. His project is noted by Jordan Darville of The Fader as being stylistically similar to American rapper Drakeo the Ruler. In December 2020, he released his mixtape Hardwood Classic with production from Detroit record producer Enrgy. In April 2021, he appeared on American rapper Lil Yachty's album Michigan Boy Boat on the track "Don't Even Bother" alongside rapper Veeze. In August 2022, he released his single "Embarrassing" alongside an accompanying music video.

== Personal life ==
=== Legal issues ===
On Wednesday, December 10, 2025, Baby Smoove was arrested in Miami following a traffic stop. According to police records, officers reported detecting the odor of marijuana and observing a firearm inside the vehicle. A subsequent search allegedly uncovered a handgun with ammunition, controlled substances, including suspected marijuana and prescription drugs, and a large amount of cash. Smoove was charged with multiple felony counts related to drug possession with intent to sell and carrying a concealed firearm. He was released shortly afterward after posting bond.

== Discography ==
=== Studio albums ===
List of albums, with selected details
Title	Album details
Baby	Released: December 3, 2019; Label: Never Stop Cashin; Format: Digital download, streaming
I'm Still Serious 2	Released: October 3, 2022; Label: Forever Franchise; Format: Digital download, streaming
Young Rich Bastard	Released: December 3, 2023; Label: Forever Franchise; Format: Digital download, streaming
Flawless 2	Released: December 3, 2024; Label: Forever Franchise; Format: Digital download, streaming
Help	Released: November 2, 2025; Label: Forever Franchise; Format: Digital download, streaming

=== Mixtapes ===
List of mixtapes, with selected details
Title	Mixtape details
Riding With the Goat	Released: October 28, 2017; Label: Never Stop Cashin; Format: Digital download, streaming
Why So Serious	Released: April 13, 2018; Label: Never Stop Cashin; Format: Digital download, streaming
I'm Still Serious	Released: October 13, 2018; Label: Never Stop Cashin; Format: Digital download, streaming
Flawless	Released: April 13, 2019; Label: Never Stop Cashin; Format: Digital download, streaming
Mr. Perfect	Released: June 15, 2019; Label: Never Stop Cashin; Format: Digital download, streaming
Purple Heart	Released: August 10, 2019; Label: Never Stop Cashin; Format: Digital download, streaming
I'm Still Perfect	Released: July 18, 2020; Label: Dha Franchise; Format: Digital download, streaming
Hardwood Classic	Released: December 3, 2020; Label: Dha Franchise; Format: Digital download, streaming

=== Extended plays ===
List of extended plays, with selected details
Title	Extended play details
Cursed	Released: 2016; Label: Independent; Format: Digital download, streaming
LA Vibes	Released: June 1, 2019; Label: Never Stop Cashin; Format: Digital download, streaming
I Been Working on my Album	Released: October 16, 2019; Label: Never Stop Cashin; Format: Digital download, streaming
Practice	Released: April 11, 2020; Label: Dha Franchise; Format: Digital download, streaming
