= Notti Osama =

American rapper (2008–2022)

- Born: Ethan Reyes; January 17, 2008; Yonkers, New York, U.S.
- Origin: Harlem, New York City, U.S.
- Died: July 9, 2022 (aged 14) Harlem, New York City, U.S.
- Genres: Hip-hop; trap; drill
- Occupations: Rapper; Singer; songwriter
- Years active: 2019–2022
- Label: Notti World
- Formerly of: OY

Ethan Reyes (January 17, 2008 – July 9, 2022), professionally known as Notti Osama, was an American rapper based in Harlem, New York City. He rose to mainstream fame following the release of Sugarhill Ddot's breakout single "Too Tact" in 2022.

== Early life ==
Reyes was born on January 17, 2008, in Yonkers, New York. While living there, he was enrolled as a student within the Yonkers Public Schools system, where he attended the Barack Obama School for Social Justice (formerly Palisade Preparatory School). He later moved to Harlem. He was the youngest of six children, five brothers and a sister. He became a sanctioned member of the Sugar Hill-based gang the OY's (Original Youngins) alongside members Sugarhill Ddot and Edot Baby. In May 2022, Reyes's family relocated to Young Avenue in North Yonkers.

== Career ==
Notti Osama developed an interest in rap with his elder brother, DD Osama, at the age of nine. On March 27, 2022, he garnered widespread attention with his appearance on fellow New York rapper Sugarhill Ddot's track "Too Tact", alongside DD Osama. On July 12, 2022, three days after his death, the single "Dead Opps" featuring DD Osama was posthumously released. Subsequently, additional posthumous singles followed between 2022 and 2023: "Evil Twins Pt.2", "Killshot", "What You Wanna Do", "On Hots", "PSA", "Blame On Me", "Flock At The Flockas", "Don't Change", "Blast" and "Peter Pan".

== Death ==
On July 9, 2022, at approximately 3PM, Reyes was involved in a physical altercation with a 15-year-old rival gang member. The altercation began on the street, later continuing into the 137th Street–City College station, where Reyes chased the individual before beginning to beat him with a broomstick. This led to the individual pulling out a knife and delivering a fatal stab wound to Reyes' abdomen, resulting in Reyes pushing the individual onto the train tracks, to which the 15-year-old pulled himself up as both attempted to escape. A short time later, emergency medical services transported Reyes to Mount Sinai St. Luke's Hospital, where he was pronounced dead at 14 years old. The charges for the case were later dropped, with the attack being classified as self-defense.

Following his death, local peers and neighbors organized a community memorial and candlelight vigil outside his home in Yonkers. In June 2026, the Barack Obama School for Social Justice in Yonkers posthumously awarded Reyes his high school diploma, which was received by his family.

== Discography ==
=== Singles ===
- "Dead Opps" (with DD Osama) (2022)
- "Evil Twins, Pt. 2" (with Sugarhill Ddot) (2022)
- "Don't Change" (2022)
- "Too Tact" (2022)
- "Blame On Me" (2022)
- "Without You" (2022)

== See also ==
- List of murdered hip-hop musicians
