= Watch My Back (mixtape) =

Mixtape by Lucki

Mixtape by Lucki
- Released: May 5, 2017
- Recorded: 2017
- Genres: Hip-hop, trap
- Length: 38:08
- Label: Self-released
- Producers: Grim Doza, Gnealz, Forza, 6 below, Plu20 Nash, Adio, Ravi, Clams Casino, F1lthy, Ugly Friend, Mayhem Meech, Lil Voe, DZY

Lucki chronology
Days B4 Storm (2017)	Watch My Back (2017)	Extra Lucky (with Brentrambo) (2017)

Watch My Back is the fourth mixtape by American rapper Lucki and the first under his new stage name, dropping the "Eck$". The project was released after he became first time father and wanted a way to come to terms with his drug addiction. The mixtape grew inspiration mainly from Future and his projects from Monster to DS2. It serves as a follow-up to his 2015 mixtape X and his EP Freewave. The project was originally distributed as a free download and uploaded to SoundCloud but was added to streaming services a month after.

In an interview with Mass Appeal Records, Lucki said that Watch My Back is his favorite record of his and noted the positive reception he received from fans.

Watch My Back marks his transition from cloud rap and alternative trap to trap itself.

== Background and release ==
Watch My Back was preceded by a two-track EP on SoundCloud called Days Be4 Storm whose tracks were also individually released as singles on streaming services. They share cover art with Watch My Back.

== Track listing ==
Credits adapted from SoundCloud.

No.	Title	Producer(s)	Length
1.	"Miss Me"	Grim Doza	1:50
2.	"Are U Wit Me"	Gnealz	3:08
3.	"Owe Me"	Forza	3:01
4.	"Komfrotable"	6 below	1:40
5.	"Poker Face"	Plu2o Nash, Adio	1:37
6.	"Bprint"	Ravi	2:21
7.	"Leave With You"	Clams Casino, Plu2o Nash	2:05
8.	"Fuck Everybody"	F1lthy	2:00
9.	"Fast Car"	Plu2o Nash	2:00
10.	"Thank God"	F1lthy	2:28
11.	"Dirty You"	Ugly Friend	2:01
12.	"No Wok"	Plu2o Nash, Mayhem Meech	1:10
13.	"Options"	F1lthy	2:22
14.	"New to Me"	Lil Voe	2:41
15.	"Owe a Nigga"	Plu2o Nash	1:57
16.	"Waiting On"	DZY	2:21
17.	"Show Time"	Plu2o Nash, Mayhem Meech	1:36
18.	"Over"	Ugly Friend	2:16
Total length:			38:53

=== Notes ===
- "Fuck Everybody" is called "Expectations" on streaming services.
