= Dr*gs R Bad =

Studio album by Lucki
- Released: May 15, 2026
- Genre: Hip-hop
- Length: 59:09
- Label: Empire

Lucki chronology
Gemini! (2024)	Dr*gs R Bad (2026)

Singles from Dr*gs R Bad
- 1. "OverTh!nking" Released: March 14, 2025; 2. "Free Mr. Banks" Released: April 4, 2025; 3. "Diamond Stitching" Released: May 30, 2025; 4. "I Don't Care" Released: August 22, 2025; 5. "Not So Virgo of You" Released: February 13, 2026; 6. "Roundtripski" Released: May 14, 2026

Dr*gs R Bad is the fourth studio album by American rapper Lucki. It was released on May 15, 2026, by Empire Distribution. The album features guest appearances from Lil Yachty, Lil Baby, Rylo Rodriguez, Veeze, and Chynna. It includes 20 new tracks and six previously released singles as bonus tracks. The album has received commercial success, earning 51,000 album-equivalent units and debuted at number nine at the Billboard 200.

== Background and release ==
The album was scheduled for release in 2024 but was delayed until 2026. Before its release, Lucki released several singles, prompting fans to speculate about a new album and leading him to announce it on March 4, 2025. On March 18, 2026, Lucki announced the release date of his new album would be May 15. The album name, Drugs R Bad, is a nod to anti-drug slogans from the War on drugs.

== Critical reception ==
Professional ratings
Review scores
Source	Rating
AllMusic	2.5/5 stars
Pitchfork	6.8/10

According to Olivier Lafontant of Pitchfork, Dr*gs R Bad received a score of 6.8 out of 10. Writing how the project has its moments, but is still flawed. Lafontant concludes that Lucki is evolving and becoming more successful, but in the process, he's losing some of the humility, curiosity, and emotional honesty that made his earlier work resonate. AllMusic's staff rated the album a 2.5 out of 5.

== Commercial performance ==
Dr*gs R Bad debuted at #9 on the Billboard 200, earning a total of 51,000 album equivalent units within its first week. It marks as Lucki's first top ten placement on the Billboard 200 chart.

== Track listing ==
Disc one
No.	Title	Producers	Length
1.	"Nuppy Intro"	Bhristo	2:20
2.	"Picky Demons:)"	Bhristo	2:06
3.	"No Stars in Maybachs" (with Rylo Rodriguez and Veeze)	Blaccmass	2:04
4.	"Stupid Prizes"	Bhristo	2:15
5.	"Supertune!!"	Bhristo	1:36
6.	"Rookie 2 Barbie"	Yung Icey; Grown Man; Jay Rich	3:28
7.	"AllWay2Space"	caspr1	1:42
8.	"MDNT Series"	Brent Rambo; Evasion2k	2:00
9.	"Can't B Trusted" (with Lil Baby)	Lul Rose; Brent Rambo; SG1; Kyuro	2:31
10.	"(Madness) !"	Brent Rambo; TJ	1:51
11.	"A Theme ATP..."	Brent Rambo; SG1	2:10
12.	"Keep It 1000, Plz"	Brent Rambo; Sonick Staxx	1:38
13.	"Brazy Interlude"	Bhristo; P4X	1:24
14.	"WayBetter Dayz" (with Chynna)	Bhristo; Brent Rambo; Yung Icey; Esko	1:46
15.	"Loyal Snake"	Bhristo	2:03
16.	"Roundtripski"	Mac Fly	3:00
17.	"Twin Flow/Godfather II" (with Veeze)	Yung Icey; DJ Moon; Saint Harri	2:42
18.	"Ur a Vet!"	Bhristo	1:48
19.	"Gemini Dramatics"	Luh Eric; Kragger; Remii Beats	2:00
20.	"Yesterday On My Face / Outro"	Brent Rambo; Carlton McDowell	2:39
Total length:			42:21

Disc two
No.	Title	Producers	Length
1.	"Not So Virgo of You" (bonus)	Brent Rambo; Bhristo	4:07
2.	"I Don't Care..." (with Lil Yachty; bonus)	Childboy; SG1; Kyuro	3:35
3.	"Diamond Stitching" (bonus)	MacFly Beatz	2:29
4.	"Free Mr. Banks" (bonus)	Brent Rambo; Markolenz	1:59
5.	"OverTh!nking" (bonus)	Brent Rambo; Tunjijuju	1:35
6.	"Tuff Luver" (bonus)	Brent Rambo; SG1	2:11
Total length:			15:56

== Charts ==
Chart performance for Dr*gs R Bad
Chart (2026)	Peak position
Canadian Albums (Billboard)	47
US Billboard 200	9
US Independent Albums (Billboard)	1
US Top R&B/Hip-Hop Albums (Billboard)	6
