= Flawless Like Me =

Studio album by Lucki
- Released: September 23, 2022
- Genre: Hip-hop; trap
- Length: 54:47
- Label: Empire

Lucki chronology
Wake Up Lucki (2021)	Flawless Like Me (2022)	S*x M*ney Dr*gs (2023)

Flawless Like Me is the debut studio album by American rapper Lucki, released under the label Empire, on September 23, 2022. It contains two feature appearances from fellow rappers Future and Babyface Ray. It reached number 12 on the Billboard 200 albums chart in the United States.

== Release and promotion ==
The first mention of the album was in a tweet from 2018, with just the album name without any other context. The rollout for the album was preceded by several singles and music videos. The first single "Super Urus" released february 18, second one "Y Not?" released June 14, "Coincidence" released on August 19 and the final one "Geeked n Blessed" which released just 4 days before the album on September 19.

== Reception ==
Professional ratings
Review scores
Source	Rating
AllMusic	2.5/5 stars

The reception by the music critics was mediocre. In review for AllMusic by David Crone, the album received 2.5 stars out of 5. Alan C. Ventura of Relish noted that the album felt "uninspired".

== Track listing ==
Credits are adopted from Spotify.

Flawless Like Me track listing
No.	Title	Length
1.	"Made My Day"	2:05
2.	"Geeked n Blessed"	2:38
3.	"Kapitol Denim" (with Future)	1:57
4.	"Coincidence"	2:03
5.	"Been a Minute"	1:40
6.	"White House" (featuring Babyface Ray)	1:47
7.	"13"	2:36
8.	"Archive Celine"	1:43
9.	"How TF?!"	2:08
10.	"DNA"	2:24
11.	"Goodfellas"	2:15
12.	"I Get It, Twin"	1:55
13.	"VVS Keyski"	2:32
14.	"Brazy Weekend"	1:59
15.	"Droughtski"	2:22
16.	"Life Mocks Art"	2:16
17.	"Noticed Ya"	2:32
18.	"10 P.M. in Lndn"	2:04
19.	"Out of Lve"	2:25
20.	"On Point"	2:17
21.	"Free Sex!"	1:55
22.	"My Way / Codeine Cowboy"	4:16
23.	"Super Urus" (bonus track)	2:22
24.	"Y Not?" (bonus track)	2:28
Total length:		54:19

Notes

- All songs are stylized in full caps except "Super Urus".

== Charts ==
Chart performance for Flawless Like Me
Chart (2024)	Peak position
US Billboard 200	12
