= Mob (Babyface Ray album) =

2022 album by Babyface Ray

Studio album by Babyface Ray
- Released: December 2, 2022
- Length: 47:40
- Label: Wavy Gang; Empire
- Producer: 2 Side; Ambezza; Blom; Box; D-Bo; DVOSK; DY Krazy; EJ Beats; GodBoyDinero; Higherside; Inkredibeatz; Jacobi; KMoneyBeats; Pooh Beatz; Sharif; Shawn Ferrari; Sledgren; SpaceTheWizard; Tommy Parker; Top$ide; xynothing

Babyface Ray chronology
| Face (2022) | Mob (2022) |

Mob is the second studio album by American rapper Babyface Ray. It was released through Wavy Gang and Empire Distribution on December 2, 2022. The album features guest appearances from Lil Durk, Blxst, Nija, Doe Boy, Samuel Shabazz, King Hendrick$, and GMO Stax. The album was supported by two singles: "Nice Guy" and "Spend It" (featuring Nija and Blxst).

In the United States, Mob entered at number 54 on the Billboard 200.

== Critical reception ==
Professional ratings
Review scores
| Source | Rating |
|---|---|
| AllMusic | 3/5 stars |
| Pitchfork | 7.5/10 |

AllMusic gave it three out of five stars and noted that the album "is another lengthy set of tracks that demonstrates the Detroit rapper's stylistic range".

In a positive review, Pitchfork wrote, "What MOB proves is that good music and hard work can be their own self-fulfilling prophecy".

== Track listing ==
Mob track listing
| No. | Title | Producer(s) | Length |
|---|---|---|---|
| 1. | "Waves On Every Chain" | SpaceTheWizard | 2:53 |
| 2. | "Wonderful Wayne & Jackie Boy" (featuring Lil Durk) | D-Bo; Jordan Fox; Inkredibeatz; Sharif | 2:13 |
| 3. | "Rap Politics" | Shawn Ferrari | 3:05 |
| 4. | "Nice Guy" | Pooh Beatz; LNKmusic; Mario Petersen; Sharif | 2:53 |
| 5. | "Brand New Benz" | KMoneyBeats | 2:26 |
| 6. | "Vonnie Skit" | Shvonne Register; Box | 0:57 |
| 7. | "Vonnie Song" | KMoneyBeats; DVOSK; AlexBrazy | 2:28 |
| 8. | "Spend It" (featuring Blxst and Nija) | Pooh Beatz; Tommy Parker; Skywalker OG; Ambezza | 3:20 |
| 9. | "WYD?" | Sledgren; Jacobi | 2:42 |
| 10. | "Crazy World" | SpaceTheWizard | 1:58 |
| 11. | "Massacre" (featuring Doe Boy) | Sledgren | 2:27 |
| 12. | "Masterpiece" | Pooh Beatz; xynothing | 2:35 |
| 13. | "Wavy Gang Immortal" (featuring Samuel Shabazz & King Hendrick$) | Top$ide | 5:16 |
| 14. | "Code + Love Me Some More" | Pooh Beatz; B. March; DY Krazy; EJ Beats; Tommy Parker; Higherside; GodBoyDinero | 3:46 |
| 15. | "Spill My Cup" | SpaceTheWizard | 2:43 |
| 16. | "Corner Suite" | KMoneyBeats | 3:53 |
| 17. | "Hallelujah" (featuring GMO Stax) | 2 Side | 2:47 |
| 18. | "Famous" | DVOSK; Blom; KMoneyBeats | 3:18 |
| Total length: | | | 47:40 |

== Charts ==
Chart performance for Mob
| Chart (2022) | Peak position |
|---|---|
| US Billboard 200 | 54 |
| US Top R&B/Hip-Hop Albums (Billboard) | 19 |
