= S*x M*ney Dr*gs =

Studio album by Lucki
- Released: July 7, 2023
- Recorded: 2022–2023
- Genre: Trap; hip-hop
- Length: 32:54
- Label: Empire
- Producer: Ali Dhanani; Alioop; Bhristo; BrentRambo; Cxdy; CAMEone & K.I.; Cash Cobain; Dot; EzMadeIt; Flansie; Hitmula; Jstcap; Kavi; Kulture; Not a Dream; Rio; Samson; Skimayne; Taurus; Tay Keith; Yung Icey

Lucki chronology
Flawless Like Me (2022)	S*x M*ney Dr*gs (2023)	Gemini! (2024)

Singles from S*x M*ney Dr*gs
- 1. "No Bap" Released: May 30, 2023; 2. "Mubu" Released: July 7, 2023

S*x M*ney Dr*gs (stylized in lowercase) is the second studio album by American rapper Lucki. It was released on July 7, 2023, through Empire Distribution. The album serves as the follow-up to his 2022 project Flawless Like Me. It features a guest appearance from American rapper Veeze.

== Release and promotion ==
The first mention of the album was on Instagram Live the day after the release of his last project Flawless Like Me. The rollout included the release of the singles "Mubu" and "No Bap". "Mubu" was accompanied by a music video directed by Lonewolf.

== Cover art ==
The cover art pays homage to Lil' Kim's 1996 album Hard Core, similarly to his mixtape Freewave II and Nirvana's Nevermind.

== Critical reception ==
Professional ratings
Review scores
Source	Rating
AllMusic	3.5/5 stars
The Needle Drop	2/10

David Crone of AllMusic rated the album 3.5 out of 5 stars, describing the albums production as "airy and optimistic".

== Commercial performance ==
Upon its release, the album was projected to sell approximately 38,000 units in its first week. It ultimately debuted at number 15 on the US Billboard 200, with 30,000 units sold, marking Lucki's second-highest chart position at the time of release.

== Track listing ==
Track listing adapted from Spotify.

S*x M*ney Dr*gs track listing
No.	Title	Writer(s)	Producer(s)	Length
1.	"Tunevert"	Mikhail Makhinko	Taurus	2:04
2.	"No Bap"	Christopher Quillin; Lucki Camel Jr.	Bhristo	2:01
3.	"Super Ski"	Camel Jr.	Cxy; Rio; Jstcap	2:15
4.	"Gemini Love"	Quillin; Jaiel Blackmon	Bhristo	2:38
5.	"2021 Vibes"	Lavon Cashmere Small	Cash Cobain	2:05
6.	"Mubu"	Nicola Kolar; Quillin; Kavi; Camel Jr.; William Slayton Lambert	Bhristo	2:39
7.	"Almighty Tune"	Camel Jr.	Dot; Samson	1:53
8.	"Str8 Syrup"	Ezekiel St. Jean	EzMadeIt; Yung Icey	1:43
9.	"Purple Heart Ski"	Camel Jr.; Isaiah Elijah Devoe; Skyler Lamoine Kieler	Ali Dhanani; Alioop; Kulture; Yung Icey	1:48
10.	"Karma a Bitch"	Camel Jr.; Quillin	Bhristo	1:46
11.	"Pop Star"	Kavian Salehi; Quillin; Camel Jr.; Stefano McNutt	Bhristo; Kavi	2:24
12.	"Wholeworldslatt" (featuring Veeze)	Andre Watson	BrentRambo; Hitmula	3:26
13.	"Bby Pluto"	Tay Keith; Watson; Kevin Gomringer; Camel Jr.; Michael Cerda; Simon Gaudes; Tim Gomringer	CAMEone & K.I.; Not a Dream; Tay Keith	2:41
14.	"Chrome Denim"	Tuheij Niklas Maruwanaya; Watson; Camel Jr.; Leon Sebastiaan Hendriks	BrentRambo; Hitmula	1:44
15.	"New York"	Hendriks; Camel Jr.; Maruwanaya	Flansie; Skimayne	1:47
Total length:				32:54

== Charts ==
Chart performance for S*x M*ney Dr*gs
Chart (2023)	Peak position
US Billboard 200	15
US Top R&B/Hip-Hop Albums (Billboard)	2
