= DD Osama =

American rapper (born 2006)

- DD Osama in 2023

Background information
- Born: David Miguel Reyes; November 29, 2006 (age 19); Harlem, New York City, U.S.
- Origin: Harlem, New York
- Genres: Hip hop; trap; drill
- Occupations: Rapper; songwriter
- Years active: 2021–present
- Label: Alamo
- Website: ddosamaworld.com

David Miguel Reyes (born November 29, 2006), known professionally as DD Osama, is an American rapper. He rose to fame in 2022 following the death of his brother Notti Osama, when their tracks "Dead Opps" and "E.4.N" found a surge of popularity through social media.

== Early life ==
David Miguel Reyes was born on November 29, 2006, in New York City, and raised first in Harlem. He grew up in a large household of Dominican descent alongside his parents and siblings, which included his younger brother Ethan Reyes (known professionally as Notti Osama), as well as older brothers who also pursued rap music.

During his childhood, Reyes’ family relocated to Yonkers, New York. Following the family's move, the siblings became integrated into the local community, where friends and neighbors established ties with the household.

== Career ==
In 2021, Reyes released his first song, "Aftermath" alongside his brother Notti Osama and fellow rapper Blockwork. Reyes began receiving recognition around June 2022.

In July 2022, his 14-year-old brother, the rapper known professionally as Notti Osama was stabbed to death. His killing led to a surge in the popularity of their song "Dead Opps", and the creation of the song "E.4.N" (Everything for Notti). Reyes has collaborated with rappers Sugarhill Ddot (his childhood friend), Chicago native Lil Zay Osama, Edot Baby, Rylo Rodriguez, and Coi Leray.

In December 2022, Reyes and fellow New York rapper Lil Mabu released a single "Throw" alongside an accompanying music video. In February 2023, he worked with rapper Coi Leray and released a song titled "Upnow". Shortly after releasing his debut mixtape "Here 2 Stay", he released the single "Let's Do It" twice, one with NLE Choppa and the other with fellow Harlem rapper DeePlay4Keeps. He is affiliated with the gang OY (Original Youngins) and screams his set's name in songs.

In August 2023, Reyes went on the tour "Sorry for the Drought" with Lil Durk. On October 24, 2024, DD Osama performed at Hoops Fest, to celebrate the opening of John Glaser Arena at La Salle University in Philadelphia.

== Reception ==
Reyes has received numerous co-signs from artists such as Polo G, Lil Durk, and Drake, with Reyes even appearing in a Nike x Nocta holiday campaign for Drake.

== Discography ==
=== Mixtapes ===
Title	Mixtape details
Here 2 Stay	Released: May 12, 2023; Label: Alamo, SME; Format: Digital download, streaming
Before The Album	Released: October 16, 2024; Label: Alamo, SME; Format: Digital download, streaming
