= Wake Up Lucki =

Studio album by Lucki & F1lthy
- Released: December 3, 2021
- Recorded: 2021
- Genres: Cloud rap, Trap
- Length: 27:05
- Label: Empire Distribution
- Producer: F1lthy

Lucki chronology
Almost Woke (2021)	Wake Up Lucki (2021)	Flawless Like Me (2022)

Wake Up Lucki is a collaborative album by American rapper Lucki and record producer F1lthy, released on December 3, 2021 via Empire. The entire project’s production is handled by F1lthy.

== Critical reception ==
Wake Up Lucki received positive reception from critics. Nadine Smith who reviewed the project for Pitchfork noted Lucki’s raps are delivered with numb detachment. Their redaction ratet the project a 7.5/10, praising the synth-heavy, futuristic beats and Lucki’s diaristic style of lyricism that balances emotional numbness with vivid imagery.

Wake Up Lucki was included in The Fader's Top 10 New Albums to stream at the time.

In interview with Rolling Stone, Lucki said that fans didn’t appreciate the project at first and had to grow on them.

== Track listing ==
All tracks are produced by F1lthy.

All tracks are written by Lucki Camel Jr.

No.	Title	Length
1.	"USED 2 BE"	2:44
2.	"NEPTUNE V.S INDUSTRY"	1:46
3.	"STILL MISS YA"	1:42
4.	"U.G.K"	2:16
5.	"2019"	2:20
6.	"WHERE I BE"	2:20
7.	"NEEDED"	1:50
8.	"CRYOUT"	2:13
9.	"SPARKS VISION"	2:25
10.	"BUSY DAY"	2:20
11.	"LOVE IS WAR"	2:16
12.	"OUTRO"	3:14
Total length:		27:05

== See also ==
- Lucki discography
- Working on Dying
