= Sugarhill Ddot =

American rapper and singer (born 2008)

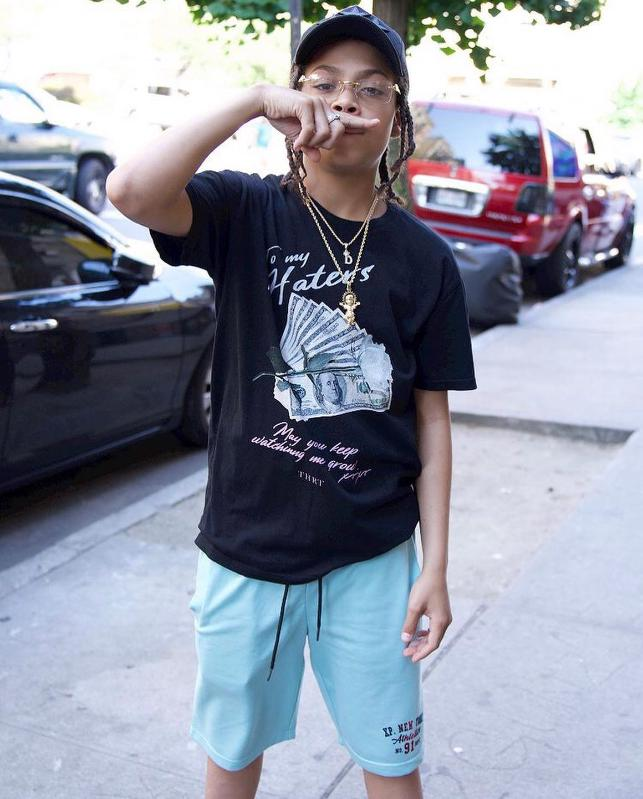
- Sugarhill Ddot in 2022

Background information
- Also known as: Ddot
- Born: Darrian Jimenez; March 8, 2008 (age 18); Harlem, New York City, U.S.
- Genres: Hip hop; drill; mumble rap; pop rap; R&B; funk
- Occupations: Rapper; singer; songwriter; streamer
- Years active: 2021–present
- Labels: Priority; DistroKid (former)
- Website: sugarhillddot.com

Darrian Jimenez (born March 8, 2008), known professionally as Sugarhill Ddot, is an American Rapper. Born and raised in Harlem, New York City, he rose to fame with the release of his breakout singles "I Wanna Love You" and "Stop Cappin" in 2022. Following his rise to fame, Ddot signed a recording contract with Priority Records in March 2023. He released his debut mixtape, 1st Side of the Story, in April 2023. He then released his debut album, 2 Sides of the Story, on August 2, 2024.

== Early life ==
Darrian Jimenez was born on March 8, 2008, in Harlem, New York City. He grew up living with his paternal grandmother. "I was more grown," he recalled. "I was primarily raised by my grandma. I always lived in her houses; whenever I moved, the property belonged to her. I shared meals with her, and if I had lived with my parents, it wouldn't have lasted." Growing up as a rapper, he drew inspirations from Canadian rapper Drake and American rapper Lil Durk.

== Career ==
=== 2021–2023: Career beginnings and record deal ===
Sugarhill Ddot's music career first began when he and his childhood friends started practicing songs and freestyles. In 2021, he took his music career seriously and released his debut single "Too Tact" on March 27, 2022, which featured fellow New York rappers DD Osama and the late Notti Osama. In September, Ddot released several singles: "Stop Cappin", "Reality", "Real Facts", "Move It", and his breakout single "I Wanna Love You", which sampled Akon's 2006 hit of the same name. In 2022, Ddot released multiple singles.

In 2023, he signed a recording deal with Priority Records and released his debut mixtape, 1st Side of the Story, on April 1. On April 14, 2023, Ddot released the single "Let Ha Go", accompanied by a music video on April 30. Later, he collaborated with rapper DD Osama on "40s n 9s" from the album Here 2 Stay, which samples Ne-Yo's 2005 classic "So Sick", in May 2023.

In June, Sugarhill Ddot was featured on Big Steppaa's single "Spinnin'". He then released "3AM in the Yams" featuring Luh Tyler on July 28. Additionally, he released "Make A Mess" on August 11 and "Shake It" on August 25. Sugarhill released "Stressed Out" on September 25. The following month, he dropped "My Baby" in November. On December 15, he released "Spinnin' (Pt. 2)", featuring Big Steppaa. Just five days later, on December 20, he was featured on DD Osama's single "Baby Wait".

=== 2024–present: 2 Sides of the Story ===
Ddot celebrated his birthday on March 8, 2024, with the release of his single "Outside". Sugarhill Ddot performed alongside DD Osama at the 2024 Rolling Loud California festival on March 15, 2024, in Inglewood, California. He continued his musical momentum with "Tweakin" on April 12 and "Like This" on May 24. On August 2, 2024, Ddot unveiled his first studio album, 2 Sides of the Story, featuring guest appearances from Hunxho, the late PnB Rock, Skilla Baby, Star Bandz, BBG Steppaa, and Luh Tyler.

== Discography ==
=== Extended plays ===
List of EPs, with selected details
Title	EP details
PSA (Public Service Announcement)	Released: November 12, 2021; Label: Sugarhill Ddot, DistroKid; Format: Digital download
Make A Mess	Released: August 11, 2023; Label: Priority, UMG Recordings, Inc.; Format: Digital download

=== Mixtapes ===
List of Mixtapes, with selected details
Title	Mixtape details
1st Side of the Story	Released: April 1, 2023; Label: Priority, UMG Recordings, Inc.; Format: Digital download

=== Albums ===
List of Albums, with selected details
Title	Album details
2 Sides of the Story	Released: August 2, 2024; Label: Priority, UMG Recordings, Inc.; Format: Digital download

== See also ==
- List of people from Harlem
