= Freewave 3 =

- Standard album cover. Soundcloud release doesnt contain text on the album cover.

Mixtape by Lucki
- Released: February 15, 2019
- Genres: Hip-hop; trap
- Length: 29:54
- Label: Self-Released
- Producers: Oxy, 100bandxan, ChaseTheMoney, Art Gallery, Cash Cobain, Mulatto Beats, StoopidXool, Marcusbasquiat, Brent Rambo, Earl Sweatshirt, Brent Rambo, Wiardon

Lucki chronology
Hell Never Mattered (with Hotelroom) (2019)	Freewave 3 (2019)	Extra Lucky 2 (with Brentrambo) (2019)

Freewave 3 is the debut commercial mixtape and fifth overall by American rapper Lucki. It was independently released on February 15, 2019. It is the third album in the Freewave series of extended plays, although Freewave 3 was released as a mixtape.

== Background and release ==
Freewave 3 was preceded by Days B4 II EP which became series of EPs Lucki would release before full length projects, as well as his collaborative EP Hell Never Mattered with Hotelroom a week before the release.

== Cover art ==
The album cover is inspired by DMX's second album "Flesh of My Flesh, Blood of My Blood."

== Critical reception ==
Freewave 3 was received well by critics. Paul A. Thompson rated the project 7.7/10 for Pichfork who wrote that production on the project is logical mutation of the production of his debut mixtape "Alternative Trap."

== Track listing ==
Credits adopted from Soundcloud.

No.	Title	Producer(s)	Length
1.	"Politics"	Oxy	02:06
2.	"Out My Way"	100bandxan	01:20
3.	"More Than Ever"	ChaseTheMoney	02:41
4.	"Of Course You Won't"	ChaseTheMoney	02:38
5.	"Believe The Hype"	Art Gallery	02:26
6.	"Geek Monster"	Art Gallery	01:58
7.	"Interlude"	ChaseTheMoney	01:07
8.	"Peach Dream"	Cash Cobain	02:07
9.	"Glory Boy"	Mulatto Beats	01:51
10.	"Let's See"	StoopidXool	02:04
11.	"2012 Summer"	Marcusbasquiat	01:38
12.	"2 Easy / Give Up"	Brent Rambo	01:54
13.	"All In"	Earl Sweatshirt	01:46
14.	"4-U / City Girl"	Brent Rambo	01:58
15.	"3D Outro"	Wiardon	02:20
Total length:			29:34
