= Sorry Not Sorry (Lil Yachty and Veeze song) =

2024 single by Lil Yachty and Veeze

Single by Lil Yachty and Veeze
- Released: August 16, 2024
- Genre: Hip hop
- Length: 2:16
- Label: Quality Control; Motown
- Songwriters: Miles McCollum; Karon Vantrees; Kayel Sims; Zion Sheppard
- Producers: K4; 183Zman

Lil Yachty singles chronology
"Die for Me" (2024)	"Sorry Not Sorry" (2024)	"Can't Hold Me Down" (2024)

Veeze singles chronology
"Store Runner" (2024)	"Sorry Not Sorry" (2024)	"One of Them Ones" (2026)

Music video
- "Sorry Not Sorry" on YouTube

"Sorry Not Sorry" is a song by American rappers Lil Yachty and Veeze, released on August 16, 2024. It was produced by K4 and 183Zman.

== Content ==
Veeze performs the first and third verses, while Lil Yachty performs the second and fourth verses. The two rap about the lifestyles they are enjoying as a result of their success in an "unapologetically braggadocious" manner. In the opening verse, Veeze references rapper Tyler, the Creator's collaboration with Louis Vuitton, drinking lean, and the song "Sorry" by Beyoncé. Lil Yachty addresses the hate he receives from online but states he does not care.

== Music video ==
The music video was released alongside the single. Directed by AMD Visuals and Little Miles, it sees the rappers in a dimly lit stage, being seen through light and shadow in an otherwise pitch black background. Veeze also drinks from a cup stacked on another as he raps.

== Charts ==
Chart performance for "Sorry Not Sorry"
Chart (2024)	Peak position
US Billboard Hot 100	99
US Hot R&B/Hip-Hop Songs (Billboard)	22
