= Lucki =

American rapper and record producer (born 1996)

LUCKI
- Also known as: Tune; Luc; Lucki Eck$; Bossy; Simpson; Deadboy; Neptune; Tuneski; 90$even; Sex Money; Tunevert
- Born: Lucki Camel Jr. May 30, 1996 (age 30); Chicago, Illinois, U.S.
- Genres: Hip-hop; trap; cloud rap
- Occupations: Rapper; record producer; songwriter
- Years active: 2012–present
- Labels: Empire; Interscope
- Website: https://www.luckivault.com/

Lucki Camel Jr. (born May 30, 1996), known mononymously as Lucki (stylized in all caps, formerly known as Lucki Eck$), is an American rapper and record producer from Chicago, Illinois. Regarded as an influential figure in underground hip-hop, he initially came to public attention in 2013 after releasing his debut mixtape, Alternative Trap. He followed with a plentitude of projects, including his mixtapes Watch My Back (2017) and Freewave 3 (2019); he later followed with the EPs Days B4 III (2019) and Almost There (2020) after signing to record label Empire.

Lucki went on to achieve mainstream prominence with the singles "New Drank" and "Super Urus"; the latter served as the lead single to Lucki's debut studio album Flawless Like Me (2022), which debuted at number 12 on the Billboard 200. Lucki's second studio album, S*x M*ney Dr*gs (2023), went on to debut at number 15. His third studio album, Gemini!, debuted at number 20, and his fourth studio album, Dr*gs R Bad, debuted at number 9, marking it as Lucki's first ever time placing on the Billboard top 10.

== Early life ==
Lucki Camel Jr. was born on May 30, 1996. He listened to Erykah Badu, Prince, and The Notorious B.I.G. growing up and cites Chief Keef, Future, Kanye West and Babyface Ray as some of his current inspirations. Lucki started rapping in his first year of high school after praise from his close friends. Soon after, he dropped out of Proviso East High School at the age of 16 to pursue music full-time because the pressures of high school fame went against his will to study.

== Career ==
=== 2012–2013: "Untouchable Lucki" ===
Initially known as "Lucki Eck$", his debut single and music video "Untouchable Lucki" was produced and premiered by music blog Elevator. Lucki's music was first brought to Elevator co-founder Bryan Zawlocki's attention by Lucki's friends Antoinne Bryant and Kevin Wright Jr, who at the time were interns for Elevator. Elevator subsequently produced Lucki's first two music videos "Untouchable" and "Everything Out$ide" directed by Bryan Zawlocki, alongside Antoinne Bryant and Kevin Wright Jr.

=== 2013–2014: Alternative Trap and Body High ===
Lucki released his debut mixtape, Alternative Trap, with his friend and producer Plu2o Nash and other producers on July 25, 2013, at 17. Lucki garnered attention from multiple music blogs including Fake Shore Drive, Elevator, Complex and Noisey, because of his distinct flow and cadence, most prominent on his lead single "Count on Me", which garnered over 700,000 views on YouTube.

After receiving attention from music blogs for his self-proclaimed "alternative trap" music, Lucki started receiving attention from other music artists as well. In July 2014, FKA Twigs collaborated with Lucki on a song titled "Ouch Ouch"; the collaboration was a celebration of Twigs' recent visit to Chicago, as she tends to collaborate with local artists when she travels.

August 7, 2014, saw the release of his second mixtape, Body High. Later on that month, Red Bull Sound Select released a track titled "Weightin' On", featuring Danny Brown, whom he met at SXSW when they both played Red Bull's Sound Select showcase.

In December 2014, Lucki collaborated with fellow Chicago musician Chance the Rapper and released a song titled "Stevie Wonder".

=== 2015–2017: X – Volume 1, Freewave EP, Son of Sam, Freewave II and Watch My Back ===
After releasing his first single to his third mixtape titled X, Lucki continued to release more songs from the mixtape in 2015; the other singles were "LowLife" and "What I Wanna". Lucki released X on May 30, 2015, his 19th birthday.

A few months later, Lucki started releasing freestyles to his first extended play Freewave. Initially, they were single songs, but he soon announced they were to be part of the upcoming EP; he first released "Free Wave Free Style" and "Backhome" and soon followed with "Freewave 3, 4, 5, and 7". On October 19, 2015, the EP originally consisted of nine songs, with the tenth song, "Rumors" added a couple of weeks later on November 4, 2015.

In January 2016, Lucki announced his name change from Lucki Eck$ to Lucki when he released the first single to his then-upcoming project, @ Midnight, titled "Deja Vu", featuring fellow Chicago rapper Joey Purp. Lucki claimed that the Eck$ moniker was "childish" and that he had "grown" from the name, which he would later on change to be all capitalized. On March 22, 2016, Lucki would release his dark and grim second EP Son of Sam. Followed by a follow up to his first EP, Freewave II on August 18, 2016. His fourth mixtape Watch My Back was released on May 5, 2017, which was supported by the singles which were also released as an EP "days be4 storm" "Sunset" and "Dont You love me".

=== 2019–2021: Freewave 3, Days B4 III, Almost There and WAKE UP LUCKI ===
Lucki released his fifth mixtape Freewave 3 on February 14, 2019, and notably included the songs “Glory Boy” & "More Than Ever". This was followed by his 11th EP Days B4 III on October 25 which had the popular song "4 The Betta". It was his first charting project, debuting at number 188 on the Billboard 200.

His 13th EP Almost There was released on May 29, 2020, acting as a placeholder for fans until his next project. On February 12, 2021, he released the single "Greed" featuring Lil Yachty.

On November 18, 2021, he released the song "Neptune v.s Industry" as the lead single to his collaborative album with producer F1lthy, WAKE UP LUCKI, which was released on December 3, 2021.

=== 2022–present: Flawless Like Me, S*x M*ney Dr*gs, Gemini!, and Dr*gs R Bad ===
Throughout 2022, Lucki began releasing several singles, including "Super Urus", released February 18, 2022, "Y Not?", released June 14, 2022, and "Coincidence", released August 19, 2022, which was accompanied by a music video directed by Cole Bennett. After many delays, Lucki released his debut studio album, Flawless Like Me on September 23, 2022, and included guest appearances from Future and Babyface Ray. It became his highest charting project, debuting at number 12 on the Billboard 200.

On January 20, 2023, he had a guest appearance on Trippie Redd's Mansion Musik album on the track "Die Die". On April 27, 2023, Lucki released the track "Leave Her". He then released the single "No Bap" on his 27th birthday. Lucki announced his second studio album, S*x M*ney Dr*gs on July 5, which ended up being released two days later, on July 7, 2023. The album marked the highest number of Spotify streams he had ever received in a day.

On March 23, 2024, Lucki released the single "All Love". Lucki would release his third studio album Gemini! later that year on June 14, 2024, with guest appearances from Lil Yachty, Rylo Rodriguez, Veeze, Future, and 42 Dugg, on a 20-song tracklist.

On May 15, 2026, Lucki released his fourth studio album Dr*gs R Bad, with guest appearances from Rylo Rodriguez, Veeze, Lil Yachty, Lil Baby and Chynna on a 26 song tracklist.

On June 4, 2026, Lucki officially signed with Interscope Records leaving EMPIRE Distribution.

== Personal life ==
Lucki has long struggled with his mental health, drug addiction, and unstable romantic relationships, which became central themes in his lyrics. He had his first child in 2016. In 2020, Lucki was accused of raping a woman while on tour in 2015; he published a social media statement denying the allegations. Lucki briefly lived in the same house as singer SZA.

On October 3, 2026, while attending ComplexCon, Lucki was involved in an altercation with members of Young Vamp Life, rapper Playboi Carti's entourage. Lucki and Playboi Carti, as well as other members of the latter's label Opium, were reported have been feuding since at least 2024. Amidst the altercation, Lucki was reportedly slashed in the neck. The Los Angeles Police Department confirmed an incident outside of the convention in a statement obtained by PEOPLE. Two victims were taken to a local hospital for treatment. PEOPLE reached out to reps for the famous rapper Lucki as well as Playboi Carti, but did not hear back from them.

== Discography ==
=== Studio albums ===
- Flawless Like Me (2022)
- S*x M*ney Dr*gs (2023)
- Gemini! (2024)
- Dr*gs R Bad (2026)

=== Collaborative albums ===
- Wake Up Lucki (with F1lthy) (2021)
