= Son of Sam (EP) =

EP by Lucki
- Released: March 22, 2016
- Recorded: 2015–16
- Genre: Hip-hop
- Length: 18:48
- Label: Self-released

Lucki chronology
Freewave EP (2015)	Son of Sam (2016)

Son of Sam (spelled incorrectly as SON OFSAM on SoundCloud) is the second EP by the American rapper Lucki. It was his first release under his new stage name. It was released on March 22, 2016.

== Background ==
Lucki released the first song "Selful" in November 2015, but was soon deleted for unknown reasons. On December 18, 2015, Lucki released "Jigga 98" with only his verse.

== Reception ==
Sheldon Pearce of Pitchfork notes the apparent influence of recreational drugs on the music, calling the vocals "sedated and leisurely".

Leor Galil, for Chicago Reader described "hazy, narcotized soundscapes", finding experimentation on "Jigga 98" and a more somber atmosphere on "Syrup Talk".

Chris Mench of Complex described the album as "Eck$ spitting over hazy, haunting beats", finding a "dark appeal" in the release.

== Track listing ==
No.	Title	Producer(s)	Length
1.	"Double Check"	Kenny Beats	2:24
2.	"Jigga 98" (featuring Da$H)		2:56
3.	"Frze Up"		2:01
4.	"Syrup Talk"		3:18
5.	"His Only...."	Kenny Beats	1:53
6.	"Nun2Me" (featuring A$AP Ant)		4:05
7.	"Selful"		2:08
Total length:			18:48

== Notes ==
- Titles are stylized in all caps.
