= Alternative Trap =

Mixtape by Lucki Eck$
- Released: February 25, 2013
- Recorded: 2013
- Genres: Alternative hip-hop; cloud rap
- Length: 45:19
- Label: Self-Released
- Producers: Hippie Sabotage, Plu2o Nash, Hippie Dream, Mullato Beats, Hytman, Clams Casino, Doc, Nate Fox, Odd Couple

Lucki Eck$ chronology
Alternative Trap (2013)	Body High (2014)

Alternative Trap is the debut mixtape by American rapper Lucki (called Lucki Eck$ at the time). It was released on 25th July, 2013 as a free download and was later reissued for streaming services. The cover art features Italian mafia boss Lucky Luciano, who shares his name with Lucki.

== Background and release ==
Alternative Trap was originally going to be an EP with 6 songs, but got expanded into full length project over time as it grew in size. After several delays, on July 16, 2013 a trailer for listening party was posted on YouTube. The project got released day after. It got supported by several singles to promote the project.

== Critical reception ==
Sheldon Pearce rated Alternative Trap 4.5 out of 5 stars for Earmilk, stating that Alternative Trap restructures the soundscape of trap music.

== Track listing ==
Credits adopted from LiveMixtapes.

All tracks are written by Lucki Camel Jr.

No.	Title	Producer(s)	Length
1.	"Count On Me II"	Hippie Sabotage	4:05
2.	"Love It"	Plu2o Nash	3:24
3.	"Interest"	Plu2o Nash	3:30
4.	"Nicky Wilson"	Hippie Dream	3:28
5.	"Time Wasted"	Mullato Beats	2:50
6.	"Alternative Trouble"	Hippie Dream	3:18
7.	"Count On Me"	Hytman	4:41
8.	"Cocaine Woman"	Clams Casino (Uncredited)	2:26
9.	"New Life" (featuring Chuck L.I.)	Plu2o Nash	3:46
10.	"48th-49th" (featuring Monster Mike)	Doc	2:36
11.	"Everything Out$ide"	Hippie Dream	3:03
12.	"No Troubles"	Nate Fox	3:22
13.	"Alternative Outro"	Odd Couple	4:50
Total length:			45:19
