= Body High =

Mixtape by Lucki Eck$
- Released: August 7, 2014
- Recorded: 2014
- Genres: Hip-Hop, cloud rap
- Length: 38:53
- Labels: Self-Released, Empire Distribution (Reissue)
- Producers: Vela Seff, Plu2o Nash, SKYWLKR, Mulatto Beats, Nuri, Keef Brain, Hytman

Lucki Eck$ chronology
Alternative Trap (2013)	Body High (2014)	X (2015)

Body High is the second mixtape by American rapper Lucki, who went by Lucki Eck$ at the time. It was released on August 7, 2014, as a free digital download, and later reissued with a different tracklist to streaming services. The 12-track project serves as the follow-up to his 2013 debut mixtape, Alternative Trap.

== Background and release ==
The release of the project was preceded by release of three singles, "Reflections", "Xan Cage" and "Finesse".

== Critical reception ==
Consequence of Sound rated the project B−. The author of the review, Adam Kivel, commented that he differentiates himself from his peers, even when his nuance is blurry. Tom Breihan of Stereogum, which designated Body High as the mixtape of the week, said that it gets numbing by the end.

== Track listing ==
Credits adopted from Audiomack.

All tracks are written by Lucki Camel Jr.

No.	Title	Producer(s)	Length
1.	"4th Commandment"	Vela Seff	3:12
2.	"Told Me"	Vela Seff	3:04
3.	"197 Trap Talk"	Plu2o Nash	3:36
4.	"Finesse"	SKYWLKR	3:26
5.	"Crime Pays"	Plu2o Nash	3:10
6.	"Witch Craft"	Plu2o Nash	4:01
7.	"Reflections"	Vela Seff	3:14
8.	"Can't Blame You" (featuring Ran$ah)	Plu2o Nash	2:38
9.	"Xan Cage"	Mulatto Beats	2:40
10.	"Slow Down"	Nuri	3:10
11.	"Hidden Place"	Keef Brain	2:59
12.	"Count On Me 3"	Hytman	3:43
Total length:			38:53

=== Notes ===
- Tracklist on the release page is different from the one in the description.
- Streaming issues have tracks in different order.
