= LiveMixtapes =

Hip hop mixtapes website

- Website type: Digital music
- Available in: English
- Headquarters: 9401 Mentor Ave, Mentor, Ohio, {{{location_country}}}
- Website: livemixtapes.com
- Registration: Optional
- Launched: 2006
- Current status: Active

LiveMixtapes is a music website related to hip-hop mixtapes.

== History ==
LiveMixtapes was established in 2006. The website started from getting free mixtapes in CD form and then putting them online. After collaborating with DJs the website grew to the #1 platform to release mixtapes in the hip-hop world with notable releases with artists like Future, Migos, 2 Chainz, Lil Wayne, Rick Ross, T.I. and more. In 2023, LiveMixtapes relaunched and rebrand the site, and introduced LMT Pro program for indie artists.
