= Ganger, Karnal =

Ganger
- Village
- Location in Haryana, India Ganger (India)
- Coordinates: 29°48′04″N 76°57′46″E
- Country: India
- State: Haryana
- District: Karnal
- Elevation: 237 m (778 ft)

Languages
  - Official: Hindi
- Time zone: UTC+5:30 (IST)
- Postal code: 132116
- Telephone code: +91-01745-XXXXXX
- Vehicle registration: HR-05
- Sex Ratio: 904:1000 ♂/♀
- Website: haryana.gov.in

Ganger or Gangar (Village ID 59169) is a small village in the Karnal district of Haryana state of India. It is about 13 km from Karnal on National Highway 44 across from the larger town of Taraori. It is under Indri constituency of Haryana state assembly.

Most people are dependent on agriculture for their livelihood. Famous personalities from Ganger village include "Thakur Kabaj Singh", "Raj Kumar Rana", and "Thakur Mehar Singh","kanwarpal Rana s/o Badan Singh" , "Anil Rana s/o kanwarpal Rana","Vikram Rana s/o kanwarpal Rana". The main crops are rice, tomato, onion and wheat. The village also hosts a Century Plyboards (I) Ltd factory.

According to the 2011 census, it has a population of 1085 living in 199 households.
