= Edot Baby =

American rapper (2005–2022)

Background information
- Born: Elijah Vincent Irvin; February 7, 2005; Harlem, New York City, U.S.
- Died: November 3, 2022 (aged 17)
- Genres: Hip-hop; trap; drill
- Occupations: Rapper; songwriter
- Years active: 2020–2022

Elijah Vincent Irvin (February 7, 2005 – November 3, 2022), known by his stage name as Edot Baby (sometimes spelt as Edot Babyy) was an American rapper. Hailing from Harlem, he rose to prominence following the release of "Ready 4 War" in 2020.

== Early life and career ==
Elijah Vincent Irvin was born in Sugar Hill, New York. He was a member of the OY's (Original Youngins), a Sugar Hill based gang. Edot Babyy garnered attention with his track "We Back Pt. 2", alongside Dee Play4Keeps, released on December 25, 2021. He also gained traction with his single "E4N," a tribute to the late Notti Osama. On March 27, 2022, "Where Are You Now" was released and is categorized as sample drill. Drake's Nocta label uniform-wear was promoted by photos with Edot Baby.

== Death ==
In the afternoon of November 3, 2022, Edot was found in his home, unresponsive on the floor. EMS responders rushed him to the hospital, but he was pronounced dead upon arrival. The cause of death was an alleged self-inflicted gunshot to the head.

== Discography ==
=== Albums ===
- The Baby In The Game (2020)
- E Wit The Dot (2022)
- You Started, I Finish (2022)

=== Singles ===
- Ride the O (2020)
- Body (2022)
- Geek (2022)
- Illegal (2021)
- We Back Pt. 2 (2021)
