= Icewear Vezzo =

American rapper and entrepreneur (born 1989)

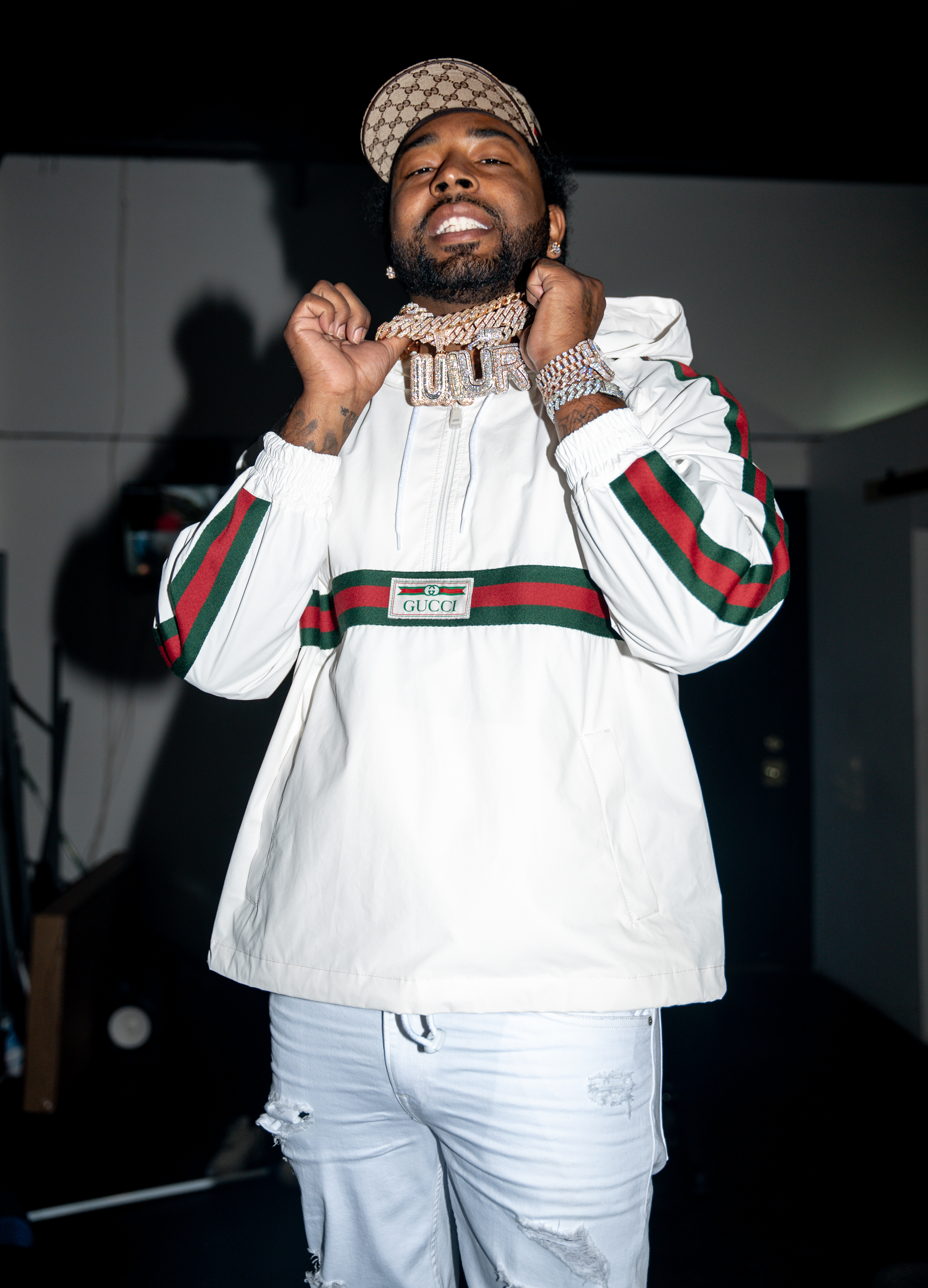

Background information
- Born: Chivez Smith; October 31, 1990 (age 36); Minneapolis, Minnesota, U.S.
- Origin: Detroit, Michigan, U.S.
- Genre: Michigan rap
- Occupations: Rapper; songwriter; actor; record executive
- Years active: 2012–present
- Labels: Motown; Quality Control; Iced Up
- Website: www.icewearvezzo.com

Chivez Smith (born October 31, 1990), known professionally as Icewear Vezzo, is an American rapper from Detroit, Michigan. As a recording artist, he is best known for his Clarity mixtape series and his Rich Off Pints mixtape trilogy, with the latter entering the Heatseekers Albums chart. He is noted as a prominent figure of the Detroit hip hop scene. In 2022, he was named to Axios Detroit's inaugural Power Players list of the city's most influential figures.

== Early life ==
Chivez Smith was raised on the east side of Detroit, in the 6 Mile (East McNichols) neighborhood.

== Career beginnings ==
Smith began his career as a member of the rap group Green Guyz, founded in Minnesota by his close relatives and siblings.

== Solo career ==
=== 2012–2018: The Clarity series and Motown ===
In 2012, he started gaining traction with the release of his debut solo mixtape The Clarity. In 2013, he released his second mixtape The Clarity 2: Can't Stop the Count the sequel to The Clarity. In 2014, he released his third Clarity mixtape The Clarity 3: Fully Blown, which reached number 48 on the Heatseekers Albums chart. In 2015, he released his fourth Clarity mixtape Clarity 4: I Can't Fall Off which featured the single "Moon Walken". In 2016, he released the full-length mixtape Moon Walken. In November 2018, Vezzo was signed to the record label Motown. In December 2018, he released his Clarity 6 under Motown, featuring Kash Doll. In February 2019, Vezzo released his debut single under Motown, "Balance" featuring rapper Big Sean. During this period he also secured a sneaker collaboration with Puma.

=== 2021–2022: Rich Off Pints series and Quality Control ===
In April 2021, he released his single "Up the Scoe" with a feature from Lil Durk. In May 2021, he released his project Rich Off Pints featuring guest appearances by Rio da Yung OG, Peezy, Louie Ray, Trippie Redd, Lil Yachty, EST Gee, Dreezy, BIG 30, and others. In June 2021, the album debuted at number seven on the Heatseekers Albums chart. In September 2021, Vezzo released his project Rich Off Pints 2 the sequel to Rich Off Pints with appearances from Rio da Yung OG, Antt Beatz, Babyface Ray, Future, Moneybagg Yo, and RMR. Rich Off Pints 2 debuted atop the Heatseekers Albums chart and peaked at number 34 on the Independent Albums chart. In July 2022, Vezzo released Rich Off Pints 3, which is the third and final installment in his Rich Off Pints mixtape trilogy. The mixtape includes performances by Lil Durk, Lil Baby, G Herbo, E-40, Key Glock, Baby Money and Antt Beatz. In August 2022, it debuted at number three on the Heatseekers Albums chart. Also in August 2022, Vezzo signed a deal with Quality Control Music through his Iced Up Records imprint and released his track "It's All On U" with rapper Kodak Black.

=== 2022–present: Paint the City and Live from the 6 ===
In December 2022, he released his song "One Time" featuring rapper Jeezy. On December 8, 2022, Vezzo released his Gangsta Grillz mixtape Paint the City with appearances from Kodak Black, Jeezy, Future, 2 Chainz, Peezy and G.T.

In February 2024, Vezzo released Live from the 6, his twentieth project, featuring DaBaby, Babyface Ray, Luh Tyler, Chuckie CEO and YTB Fatt, via Iced Up Records and Quality Control Music. To mark the release, Vezzo partnered with the Detroit Department of Transportation to fund free bus rides on the east and west McNichols (6 Mile) routes. A second installment, Live from the 6 (Part Two), followed later in 2024. Undefeated the EP and Live from the 6 Part Two later released in 2025. Vezzo just recently announced the July 17, 2026 release of Rich Off Pints 4 (ROP4).

== Other ventures ==
=== Iced Up Records ===
Iced Up Records is an independent record label founded by Vezzo. The label has its own film production company, Iced Up Films; its first film was Price of Love. Iced Up Records entered a partnership with Quality Control Music in 2022, through which Vezzo releases music jointly while retaining ownership of his imprint.

=== House of Dank ===
In December 2025, Vezzo and fellow Detroit rapper Peezy became the first franchise partners in the history of House of Dank, one of Michigan's largest cannabis retailers, opening the H.O.D. Gratiot dispensary at 11999 Gratiot Avenue on Detroit's east side, in the neighborhood where both artists were raised. It was the first franchise-partner location in the company's more than ten-year history. The store opened on December 19, 2025, with a public grand opening celebration held on March 7, 2026.

=== Fresh and Pressed Juice ===
Vezzo is an investor in Fresh and Pressed Juice, a cold-pressed juice bar in Troy, Michigan, founded and owned by his wife, Kiara Smith. Smith opened the business in July 2023 after developing juice recipes to address her son's health issues. Vezzo has publicly emphasized Smith's ownership and leadership of the company, describing himself as its investor.

=== Consumer products ===
Vezzo launched Vezzo Hotz, a branded snack chip line.

=== Chicken Talk ===
In July 2015, Vezzo opened a restaurant called Chicken Talk.

== Philanthropy and community engagement ==
In September 2019, Vezzo hosted the "Walk a Mile in My Shoe Drive" on Detroit's east side in partnership with the Detroit Rappers Organization, a community outreach organization run by his mother, Mildred Smith. The event, held with the Kicks 4 Kids Foundation and other local partners, collected and distributed hundreds of pairs of shoes along with fresh food to Detroit residents.

In April 2020, during the COVID-19 pandemic, Vezzo took on a civic leadership role in Detroit's 2020 United States census participation campaign, appearing at a joint press conference with Mayor Mike Duggan to urge residents to complete the census. Duggan publicly welcomed Vezzo's involvement, noting that residents were more likely to respond to trusted community voices than to government outreach.

His other community initiatives in Detroit have included annual back-to-school giveaways, funding free DDOT bus rides along the 6 Mile corridor, and holiday charity drives.

== Awards and recognition ==
In August 2022, Vezzo was presented with the Spirit of Detroit Award by Detroit City Council President Mary Sheffield at his annual back-to-school giveaway, in recognition of his service to the city.

In December 2022, he was named to Axios Detroit's inaugural Power Players list of the city's eight most influential figures, alongside then-Mayor Mike Duggan, with Axios describing him as the leader of Detroit's nationally influential rap sound.

== Personal life ==
Smith is married to Kiara Smith, an entrepreneur and owner of Fresh and Pressed Juice. The couple have children and reside in the Detroit metropolitan area.

== Discography ==
- The Clarity (2012)
- The Clarity 2 (2013)
- The City Is Mine (2013)
- The Clarity 3: Fully Blown (2014)
- Solitaires: Drank God (2014)
- Clarity 4: I Can't Fall Off (2015)
- Moon Walking (2016)
- Purple City with Antt Beatz (2016)
- Price Goin Up (2017)
- Clarity 6 (2018)
- Robbin Season (2019)
- Drank Baby (2020)
- Robbin Season 2 (2020)
- Rich Off Pints (2021)
- Rich Off Pints 2 (2021)
- Rich Off Pints 3 (2022)
- Paint the City with DJ Drama (2022)
- Live from the 6 (2024)
- Live from the 6 (Part Two) (2024)
- Rich off Pints 4 (2026)
- Robbin Season 3 (TBA)
- R.O.P. 5 (TBA)
- TBA (Hosted by Hitmaka) (TBA)
- TBA (With Rio da Yung OG) (TBA)
