= Rio da Yung OG =

American rapper

- Rio da Yung OG in 2025

Background information
- Also known as: Rio
- Born: Da'mario Donshay Horne-McCullough; May 11, 1994 (age 32); Flint, Michigan, U.S.
- Genres: Hip-hop; trap; drill; hoodtrap
- Occupations: Rapper; songwriter
- Years active: 2016–present
- Labels: Ghetto Boyz; M.I.N.E.

Da'mario Donshay Horne-McCullough (born May 11, 1994), known professionally as Rio da Yung OG, is an American rapper.

== Career ==
Horne–McCullough started rapping under the name Rio da Yung OG in 2017. In 2019, he was placed under house arrest due to drug trafficking charges. This period led him to great musical productivity, releasing seven projects in the space of a year, including the Dum and Dumber mixtape series in collaboration with rapper RMC Mike, which gained him notoriety within the rap scene. In 2020, he released City on My Back, a 15-track album. He then helped put other local artists on the map, including YN Jay and Louie Ray.

His career was interrupted in 2021 by a 44-month prison sentence. Just before his incarceration, he recorded "Last Day Out", a song with nostalgic tones. Despite his imprisonment, his popularity continued to grow and he continued to regularly release music recorded prior to his imprisonment. He released the Fiend Lives Matter EP in 2021, The F Tape EP in 2023 and the Rio Circa 2020 album in 2024. In May 2024, his single "Legendary", released in 2019, was certified gold. He was released in December 2024 and celebrated his release with the album Rio Free in January 2025. He released his second 2025 album, F.L.I.N.T. (Feeling Like I'm Not Through), in August 2025.

== Style ==
Rio da Yung OG performing in 2025

He is known for his raw, direct, offhand and provocative style, mixing dry humor and unfiltered accounts of street life, which his friend RMC Mike describes as "blunt rap". His tracks are generally chorus-free. He often raps in one take, in a conversational tone, retaining imperfections such as stutters or recording flaws. In an interview, Rio da Yung OG himself declares, "I don’t think I can rap for real". He was initially inspired by Detroit rapper Peezy, who became his mentor.

The productions on which he poses are generally dominated by powerful piano and bass, in a style characteristic of Michigan hip-hop.

== Personal life ==
Rio da Yung OG was raised in Flint, Michigan. He has visible facial scarring due to deep second-degree burns on the right side of his face. In an interview, he revealed that he got the scars when he was 12, as he tried to cook French fries, but was intoxicated and forgot about them, and a grease fire began. He attempted to stop the fire with water, which is dangerous because grease has a lower density than water, causing it to go up and expand the flames upwards. The burn remains because he denied getting skin graft treatment.

=== Legal issues ===
On February 27, 2019, Rio da Yung OG and 14 co-defendants were charged for multiple federal crimes. Rio da Yung OG was sentenced to five years in federal prison after pleading guilty to one count of possession of a firearm in furtherance of a drug trafficking crime. He began serving his sentence in Summer 2021 after surrendering himself at the behest of the court.

Rio's arrest sparked the "Free Rio" movement. Rappers Trippie Redd and Louie Ray made songs dedicated to freeing Rio. The rapper Peezy also released the mixtape Free Rio. Other rappers supporting his release included 42 Dugg, BabyTron, and RMC Mike. In addition to American artists, the #FREERIO movement resonated with Russian musicians, particularly those from the creative collective Melon Music. The most active support came from rapper OG Buda, who in 2021 released an album titled FREERIO. Later, its sequels — the albums FREERIO 2 and FREERIO 3 were released. These releases became highly popular on the Russian music scene and are noted for preserving the distinct Detroit musical style, similar to the sound of Rio Da Yung OG himself. In an interview, OG Buda explicitly stated that with these albums he wanted to pay tribute to Rio Da Yung OG.

Another member of the collective, 163ONMYNECK, has frequently referenced the movement's slogans in his work. Phrases like "Free Rio" and "Free ghetto" appear in his lyrics, for example in the songs "Ugaday melodiyu" (Guess the Melody), "Vosap" (Wassup), "Shchit tolkin" (Shit Talkin'), and the track "Free Rio" is directly dedicated to Rio Da Yung OG. Support for the idea has also been expressed by other Melon Music representatives, including Scally Milano, as reflected in their joint track "Beseda" (Conversation).

He was released from jail on December 11, 2024, having served 3 years and 8 months of his sentence.

== Discography ==
=== Albums, EPs and mixtapes ===
- Testers (2019)
- Ghetto Babies (2019)
- Testers, pt. 2 (2019)
- Dumb and Dumb3r (2019) (with RMC Mike)
- Dum and Dumber Too (2019) (with RMC Mike)
- 2 Faced (2019)
- City on My Back (2020)
- Accidental Sh*t Talking (2020)
- Life of a Yung Og (2021) (with Nuez)
- Dum N Dumbber 3 (2021) (with RMC Mike)
- Fiend Lives Matter (2021)
- The F Tape (2023)
- Rio Circa 2020 (2024)
- Rio Free (2025)
- F.L.I.N.T. (Feeling Like I'm Not Through) (2025)
- The World Is Yours (2026)

=== Certified singles ===
Title	Year	Certifications	Album
"Legendary"	2019	RIAA: Platinum	2 Faced

=== Other certified songs ===
Title	Year	Certifications	Album
"Too Legendary"	2019	RIAA: Gold	2 Faced
