= X (Lucki mixtape) =

Mixtape by Lucki Eck$
- Released: May 30, 2015
- Recorded: 2015
- Genres: Hip-hop, cloud rap
- Length: 30:55
- Label: Self-released
- Producers: Boathouse, Plu20 Nash, Lucki Eck$, Imfamous Legends, Bulletproof Dolphin, Young Chop, Skywlkr, Black Noise

Lucki Eck$ chronology
Body High (2014)	X (2015)	Freewave (2015)

X is the third mixtape by American rapper Lucki (Lucki Eck$ at the time of the release). It was released on May 30, 2015, on his 19th birthday. It was released as a free download. It follows his previous mixtape, Body High from 2014.

== Critical reception ==
Pichfork rated the mixtape a 7.5/10, describing it as bleak, murky, and tonally somber and noting inspiration from Earl Sweatshirt. Bryan Snow Jr. from Lyrical Lemonade said that Lucki shows "flashes of greatness".

== Tracklist ==
Credits adopted from Soundcloud.

No.	Title	Producer(s)	Length
1.	"What I Wanna"	Boathouse	2:04
2.	"Lil Bitch"	Plu2o Nash	2:23
3.	"Low Life"	Lucki Eck$	3:58
4.	"Still Steal" (featuring Ransah)	Plu2o Nash	2:44
5.	"Inside"	Imfamous Legends	3:12
6.	"Mac N Cheese"	Lucki Eck$	3:08
7.	"Mia Wallace"	Bulletproof Dolphin	3:00
8.	"Bird Gang"	Lucki Eck$	1:47
9.	"None Other"	Bulletproof Dolphin	3:14
10.	"Stevie Wonder" (featuring Chance the Rapper)	Young Chop	3:13
11.	"Finesse II"	Skywlkr & Black Noise	2:12
Total length:			30:55
