= Almost There (EP) =

EP by Lucki
- Released: May 29, 2020
- Length: 26:02
- Label: Empire
- Producer: BrentRambo; Plu2o Nash; Dtuned; Condo; Wiardon; Kid Hazel; Young Icey; StoopidXool

Lucki chronology
Freewave 3 (2019)	Almost There (2020)

Singles from Almost There
- 1. "Faith" Released: April 17, 2020; 2. "Tune & Scotty" Released: May 22, 2020

Almost There is an EP by American rapper and producer Lucki. It was released on May 29, 2020 under Empire.

The first single to be released, "Faith" was released on April 17, 2020. The second single "Tune and Scotty" was released on May 22, 2020.

== Track listing ==
Almost There track listing
No.	Title	Producer(s)	Length
1.	"Tarantino"	BrentRambo	1:55
2.	"At Least I Think It's Real"	Plu2o Nash	1:26
3.	"Unlimited"	Condo; Wiardon	2:41
4.	"Pick A Flaw"	BrentRambo	2:22
5.	"Its Bool"	Dtuned	2:35
6.	"Ouch Omen"	StoopidXool	1:52
7.	"Runnin With"	Kid Hazel	2:27
8.	"Prada Tune"	StoopidXool	2:03
9.	"Tune and Scotty"	Plu2o Nash	2:18
10.	"Pure Love - Hate"	BrentRambo	2:06
11.	"Nigo"	Plu2o Nash	2:29
12.	"Faith"	Young Icey	1:48

== Charts ==
Chart performance for Almost There
Chart (2020)	Peak position
US Top Album Sales (Billboard)	38
US Heatseekers Albums (Billboard)	5
US Independent Albums (Billboard)	32
