= Veeze =

American rapper (born 1995)

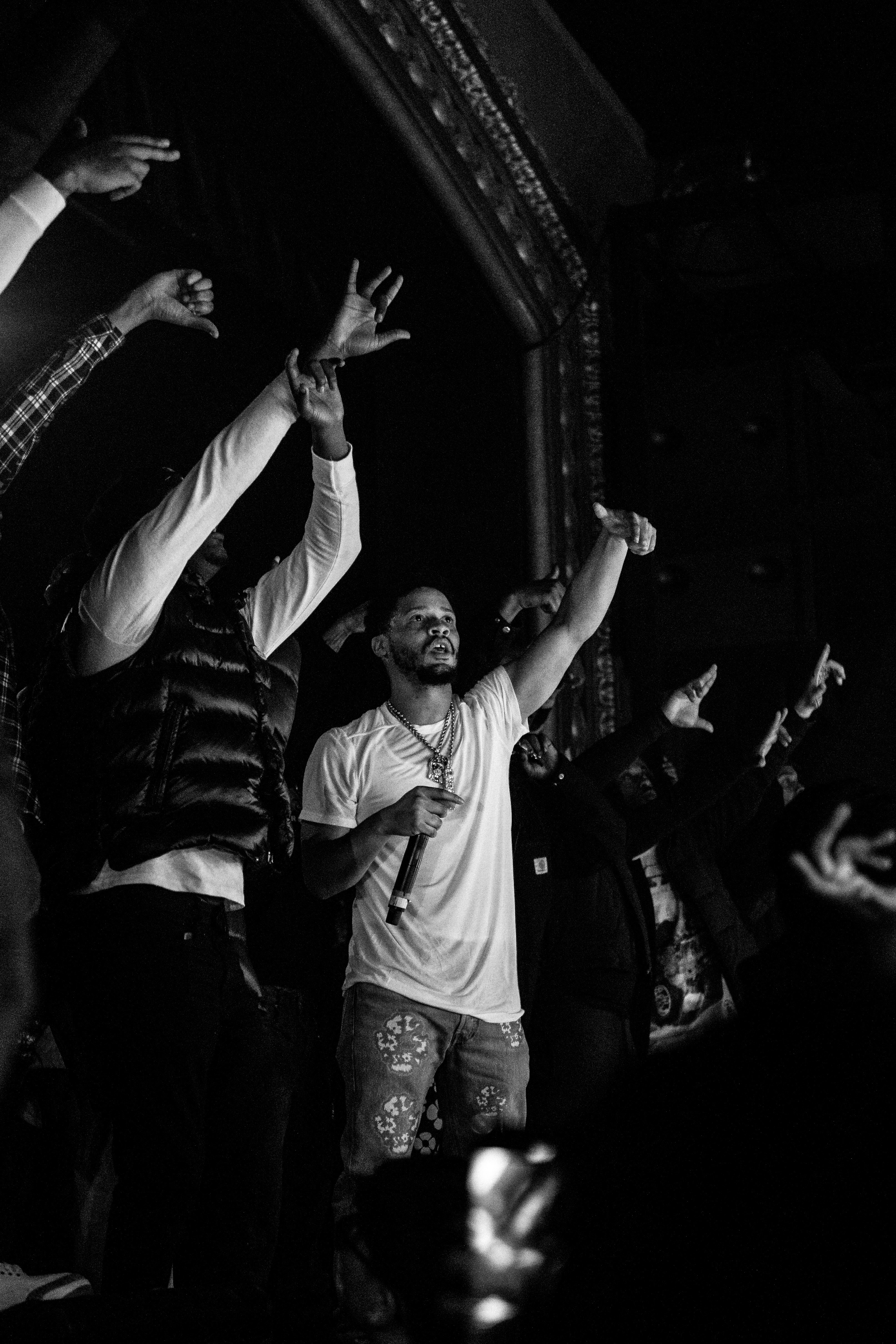
- Veeze performing in Detroit in 2023

Background information
- Also known as: Veeze Worst • Black Justin Timberlake
- Born: Karon Malcolm Vantrees; February 28, 1995 (age 31); Detroit, Michigan, U.S.
- Genres: Michigan rap; trap; mumble rap
- Occupations: Rapper; singer; songwriter
- Works: Veeze discography
- Years active: 2017–present
- Labels: Warner; Navy Wavy
- Website: gangerworldwide.com

Karon Malcolm Vantrees (born February 28, 1995), known professionally as Veeze, is an American rapper and singer. He pursued a recording career in 2017 and released his debut single, "Itself," in 2019. His debut mixtape, Navy Wavy, was released in September of that year. He signed with Warner Records to release his debut studio album, Ganger (2023), which peaked at number 97 on the Billboard 200. It was supported by the single "GOMD" (remixed featuring Lil Uzi Vert).

His 2024 single, "Sorry Not Sorry" (with Lil Yachty), marked his first entry on the Billboard Hot 100.

== Early life ==
Karon Vantrees, was born in Detroit, Michigan. He spent his formative years on the city's West Side, specifically on Seven Mile Road. Before pursuing a career in music, Veeze harbored aspirations of becoming a professional basketball player, specifically an NBA guard. However, he eventually redirected his focus towards music. Veeze has openly discussed his past experiences with substance abuse, including involvement with lean and other drugs. These struggles, which occurred during his youth, have been referenced in his music. Veeze's musical style is heavily influenced by the Detroit hip-hop scene. He has cited various prominent Detroit rappers as inspirations.

Veeze's upbringing instilled a strong hustle mentality, prompting him to sell apples and pears to make ends meet. His musical tastes were shaped by legendary artists such as Tupac Shakur, DMX, Jay-Z, Lil Wayne, Cam'ron, Nate Dogg, Bun B, Scarface, Jadakiss, and Busta Rhymes.

== Career ==
=== 2017–2022: Early works ===
Veeze began his music career in the Detroit rap scene. He started rapping in summer 2019, drawing inspiration from local Detroit groups such as Street Lord'z, Doughboyz Cashout, and Team Eastside. Veeze released his debut single, "Itself", on May 22, 2019. The song, also his first commercial release, featured guest appearances from Wtm Scoob and DT. The song was produced by Top$ide. Additionally, "Itself" garnered moderate attention upon its release. Two days following the release of "Itself", Veeze released "Rusty" on May 24, 2019. "Rusty" was produced by Tye Beats. It did not chart on Billboard. Veeze's "Rusty" gained local attention, attracting the notice of Babyface Ray, who subsequently supported Veeze by funding his debut music video.

Veeze released his debut mixtape, Navy Wavy, on September 27, 2019, through Warner Records. It included the previously released singles "Itself", "Rusty", and "Heart Insurance". The mixtape featured guest appearances from Babyface Ray, Peezy, and Beno. Veeze released the single "Law & Order" independently on September 18, 2020. Additionally, Veeze was featured on Nino Number 9's "The Ninth (Remix)", released independently on December 21, 2020. Veeze was featured on RoadRunna Wite's "OFF WHITE" on January 3, 2021. He released the single "A and W" on March 11, 2021. Veeze was featured on Babyface Ray's "Gallery Dept" on May 13, 2021. It was released through Empire Distribution and produced by Rocaine.

Veeze released singles: "Free Shiest" on August 16, 2021, "Choppas in Hawaii" on August 20, 2021, "Kurt Angle" on November 5, 2021, "Let It Fly" on March 20, 2022, and "Talk Prices" in Apr 2022. On June 17, 2022, Veeze featured on Lil Baby's track "U-Digg", alongside 42 Dugg, accompanied by an official music video. "U-Digg" debuted at number 52 on the Billboard Hot 100, marking Veeze's first appearance on the chart.

=== 2023–present: Rise to mainstream popularity with Ganger ===
Veeze released his first single, "4 Kobe", on January 3, 2023. That same year, he gained widespread recognition with the single "GOMD" after going viral on social media, followed by a remix featuring Lil Uzi Vert. The music video was also released. The video was directed by Lestyn Park, which has garnered 10 million views on YouTube as of March 21, 2023.

On June 27, 2023, he released his debut studio album, Ganger. It features collaborations with Lucki, Babyface Ray, Icewear Vezzo, Lil Yachty, and Lil Uzi Vert. The album received widespread critical acclaim, with several critics ranking it among the best albums of 2023. It debuted at number 97 on the Billboard 200. According to Pitchfork's Matthew Ritchie, Veeze's style is characterized by "vocal oddities and chuckle-inducing, stream-of-consciousness bars," with a dynamic range that "oscillates between laid-back joints fit for an evening smoke session."

Ganger propelled Veeze to mainstream fame, ranking #16 on Complex's Best Albums of 2023, #20 on The Fader's 50 Best Albums of 2023, and #39 on Rolling Stone's 100 Best Albums of 2023. Another successful album track, "Safe 2", also garnered attention.

Additionally, Veeze featured on two subsequent releases: BigWorkDog's "Talk To Em" (August 31, 2023) and Desto Dubb's "Dead Homies" (September 29, 2023).

In September 2023, Veeze launched his record label Navy Wavy in partnership with Warner Records. On October 13, 2023, a deluxe edition of Ganger was released, featuring five additional tracks. On December 1, 2023, Veeze released "ATL Freestyle 1 & 2", a dual single featuring guest appearances from Florida-based rapper Luh Tyler and Louisiana-based rapper Rob49.

Veeze released singles "Pop Yo Shit" on May 30, 2024, and "F*cked A Fan" featuring Rylo Rodriguez on July 12, 2024, both accompanied by music videos. On July 25, 2024, Veeze announced that he will go on a tour in North America, titled Worst Tour Ever. He noted that the tour will have support from Karrahbooo, Wizz Havinn, and Star Bandz. Veeze was featured on Tye Beats' debut single "Wocky Sinner" on August 2, 2024, and Lil Yatchy's "Sorry Not Sorry" on August 16, 2024, released via Quality Control and Motown Records.

== Musical style ==
Vantrees is noted for his frequent flows, energetic rapping, and cognizant tones, which he notably employed on his breakout single "GOMD". His sound has also been described as "melodic", albeit with a "mutter-croak" style. Chris Richards of The Washington Post newspaper stated that Veeze usually has a "wild and nonchalant" delivery in his verses. While pursuing his career, Veeze listened to Street Lord'z and Doughboyz Cashout, two prominent groups from the city of Detroit. (Note: The Detroit rapper jumped onto the hip-hop landscape in a big way this year and is looking to make himself a permanent fixture. (See career.))

== Navy Wavy ==
Navy Wavy
- Founded: 2023
- Founder: Karon Malcolm Vantrees (Veeze)
- Status: Active
- Distributor: Warner
- Genre: hip-hop, trap, pop rap
- Country of origin: U.S.
- Location: Detroit, Michigan
- Official website: gangerworldwide.com

Navy Wavy is an American record label founded by Veeze in 2023. It operates as an imprint of Warner as of 2024. He released his first music video, "Safe 2", under the label on September 14, 2023.

== Discography ==
=== Studio albums ===
List of albums, with selected details and chart positions
Title	Studio album details	Peak chart positions	
Title	Studio album details	US	US R&B/HH
Ganger	Released: June 27, 2023; Label: Warner; Formats: Digital download, streaming	97	42

=== Mixtapes ===
List of mixtapes, with selected details
Title	Mixtape details
Navy Wavy	Released: September 27, 2019; Label: Warner; Formats: Digital download, streaming
Y’all Won	Released: May 22, 2026; Label: Warner; Formats: Digital download, streaming

=== Singles ===
List of singles as lead artist, showing year released, certifications, and album name
Title	Year	Peak chart positions		Certifications	Album
Title	Year	US	US R&B/HH	Certifications	Album
"Talk Prices"	2019	—	—		
"Making a Mess" (Pooh Shiesty featuring Big30 and Veeze)	2021	—	—	RIAA: Gold	
"Close Friends"	2022	—	—		Non-album singles
"Yoa Twin"	2022	—	—		Non-album singles
"4 Kobe"	2023	—	—		Non-album singles
"ATL Freestyle 1 & 2" (featuring Luh Tyler and Rob49)	2023	—	—		Non-album singles
"GOMD"	2023	—	—	RIAA: Gold	Non-album singles
"Not A Drill"	2023	—	—	RIAA: Gold	Non-album singles
"Sorry Not Sorry" (with Lil Yachty)	2024	99	22		Non-album singles
"F*cked A Fan" (featuring Rylo Rodriguez)	2024	—	—	RIAA: Gold	
"One of Them Ones" (with Lil Baby and Rylo Rodriguez)	2026	—	50		
