= Luh Tyler =

American rapper (born 2006)

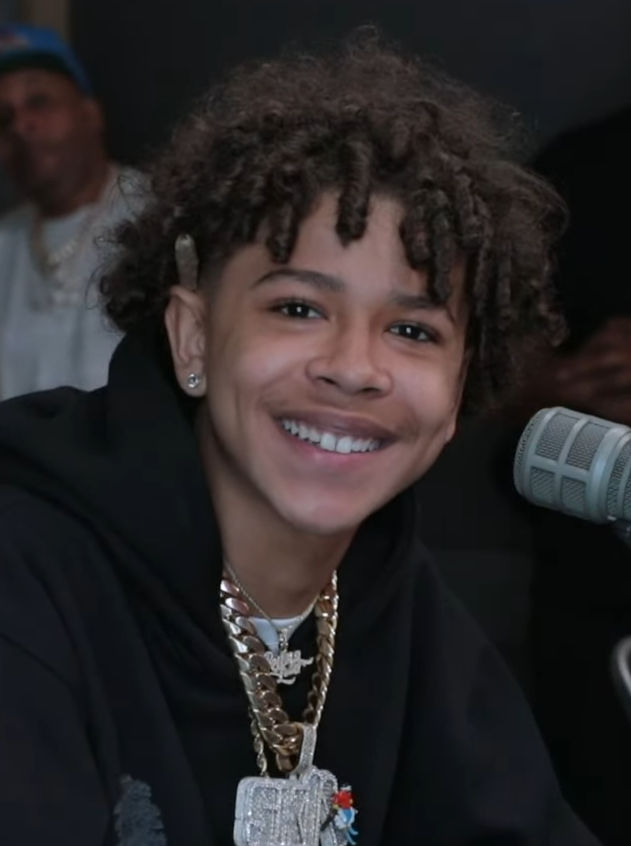
- Luh Tyler in 2023

Background information
- Born: Tyler Reed Meeks; February 20, 2006 (age 20); Tallahassee, Florida, U.S.
- Genres: Hip hop; R&B; trap
- Occupations: Rapper; singer; songwriter
- Years active: 2022–present
- Labels: Motion; Atlantic
- Website: realluhtyler.com

Tyler Reed Meeks (born February 20, 2006), known professionally as Luh Tyler, is an American rapper and singer-songwriter. He is known for his work in the "Florida rap" style.

== Career ==
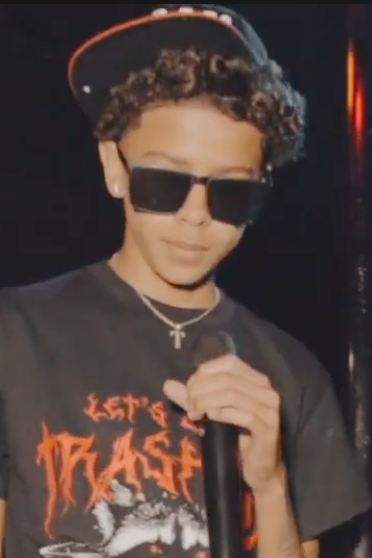
Luh Tyler in 2022

In November 2022, Meeks recorded and released his hit single, titled "Law & Order", that went viral on TikTok. Then he made "Law & Order Part 2". a sequel to his viral hit "Law & Order".

In February 2023, Meeks appeared as a featured artist, alongside a fellow American rapper Ski Mask the Slump God on the latter's single, called "Florida Water".

On March 31, 2023, Meeks released his debut mixtape, titled My Vision. The tape features guest appearances from fellow American rappers Trapland Pat and NoCap. On April 4, Meeks released a reloaded version from its original version of his debut mixtape. The reloaded version features an added guest appearances from a fellow American rapper Lil Uzi Vert. Upon its release, both the original and reloaded version had peaked at number 2 on the US Billboard's Top Heatseekers chart.

In January 2024, Meeks announced on Instagram that he would be an opening act on A Boogie wit da Hoodie's Better Off Alone Tour during Spring and Summer 2024.

== Discography ==
=== Studio albums ===
List of albums, with selected details and chart positions
Title	Album details	Peak chart positions	
Title	Album details	US	US Heat.
Mr. Skii	Released: August 23, 2024; Label: Motion, Atlantic; Formats: Digital download, streaming, CD	197	3
Destined For Greatness		—	—

=== Mixtapes ===
List of albums, with selected details and chart positions
Title	Album details	Peak chart positions
Title	Album details	US Heat.
My Vision	Released: March 31, 2023; Label: Motion, Atlantic; Formats: Digital download, streaming, CD	2
Florida Boy	Released: May 30, 2025; Label: Motion, Atlantic; Formats: Digital download, streaming	—

=== Charted singles ===
Title	Year	Peak chart positions		Album
Title	Year	US Bub.	US R&B/HH	Album
"2 Slippery" (featuring BossMan Dlow)	2024	6	29	Mr. Skii
