= Babyface Ray =

American rapper (born 1991)

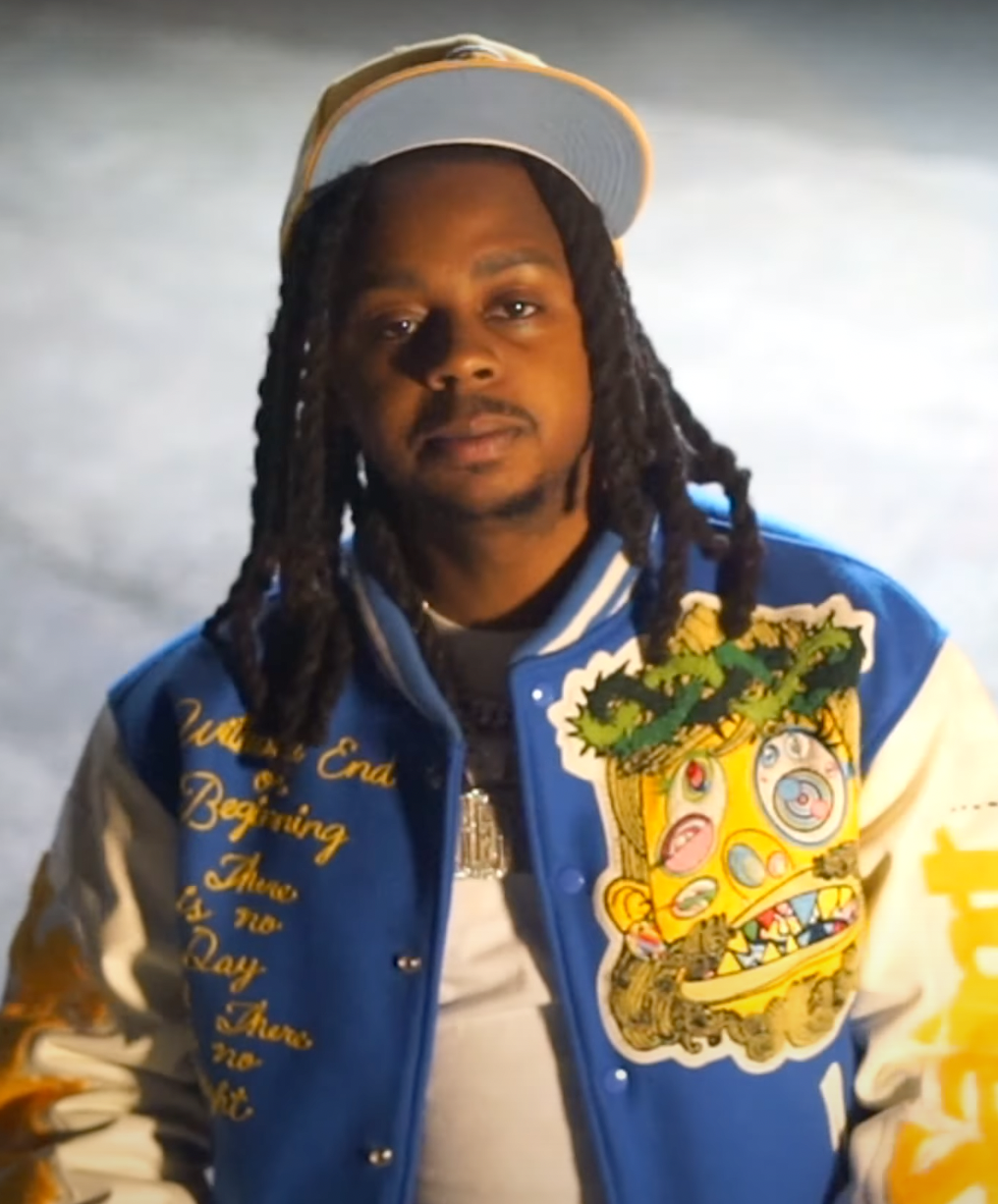
- Babyface Ray in 2022

Background information
- Also known as: Face
- Born: Marcellus Rayvon Register; February 7, 1991 (age 35); Detroit, Michigan, U.S.
- Genres: Michigan rap; trap
- Occupations: Rapper; songwriter
- Years active: 2014–present
- Label: Empire

Marcellus Rayvon Register (born February 7, 1991), known professionally as Babyface Ray, is an American rapper. He is a prominent figure in 2020s Detroit hip hop.

== Early life ==
Born February 7, 1991, in Detroit, Ray played basketball and football, alongside playing the trumpet.

== Career ==
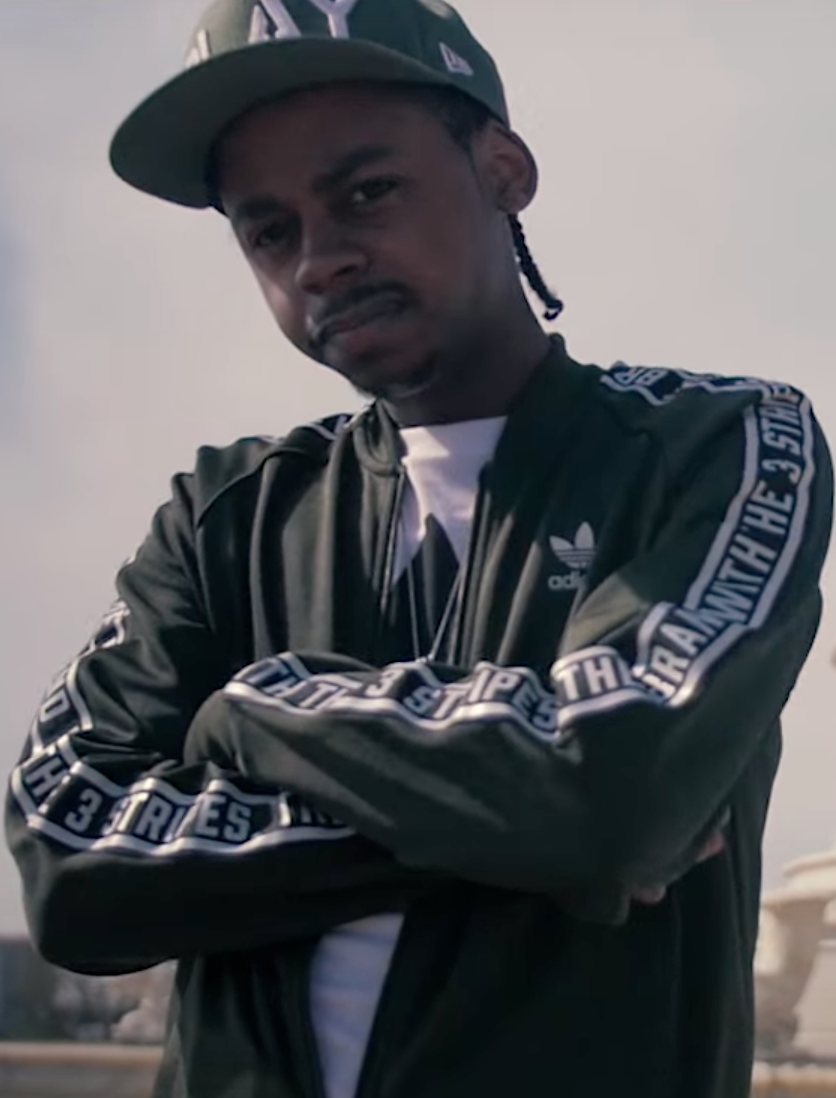
Babyface Ray in April 2017

In 2010, Ray joined Team Eastside alongside fellow Detroit rapper Peezy. In 2015, he started gaining traction with the release of his debut mixtape MIA Season. In 2017, he released his mixtape Ghetto Wave. In 2019, he released his second mixtape MIA Season 2 the sequel to MIA Season. This mixtape would give him his first viral song move to la which was popoular on tik tok at the time . In February 2021, he released his first EP Unfuckwitable with appearances from EST Gee, Moneybagg Yo and Kash Doll. The EP debuted at number 128 on the Billboard 200 dated February 27, 2021. In August 2021, he released his single "It Ain't My Fault" featuring rapper Big Sean. In January 2022, Ray released his debut album Face with appearances from Swedish rapper Yung Lean, G Herbo, 42 Dugg, Pusha T, Wiz Khalifa, and Landstrip Chip. The album peaked at number 31 on the Billboard 200 and two on Independent Albums chart. Later in 2022, he appeared in the 2022 XXL Freshman class and in the subsequent cypher alongside rappers BabyTron, Cochise and Kali.

== Discography ==
=== Studio albums ===
List of albums, with selected details and chart positions
Title	Studio album details	Peak chart positions
Title	Studio album details	US
Face	Released: January 28, 2022; Label: Wavy Gang, Empire; Format: Digital download, streaming	31
Mob	Released: December 2, 2022; Label: Wavy Gang, Empire; Format: Digital download, streaming	54
Summer's Mine	Released: July 21, 2023; Label: Wavy Gang, Empire; Format: Digital download, streaming	92
The Kid That Did	Released: September 13, 2024; Label: Wavy Gang, Empire; Format: Digital download, streaming	71
Codeine Cowboy	Released: August 15, 2025; Label: Wavy Gang, Empire; Format: Digital download, streaming	—

=== Mixtapes ===
List of mixtapes, with selected details
Title	Mixtape details
MIA Season	Released: February 4, 2015; Label: Self-released; Format: Digital download, streaming
Young Wavy	Released: November 7, 2015; Label: Self-released; Format: Digital download, streaming
Legend	Released: June 2, 2017; Label: Wavy Gang; Format: Digital download, streaming
Trillest	Released: October 21, 2017; Label: Wavy Gang; Format: Digital download, streaming
Ghetto Wave (with Peezy)	Released: December 25, 2017; Label: Boyz Entertainment LLC; Format: Digital download, streaming
The Last One Left	Released: May 17, 2019; Label: Wavy Gang; Format: Digital download, streaming
MIA Season 2	Released: November 22, 2019; Label: Wavy Gang; Format: Digital download, streaming

=== Extended plays ===
List of albums, with selected details and chart positions
Title	EP details	Peak chart positions
Title	EP details	US
I Did This Today	Released: September 1, 2016; Label: TF Entertainment; Format: Digital download, streaming	—
My Cup of Tea	Released: December 29, 2016; Label: Self-released; Format: Digital download, streaming	—
I Did This Today 2	Released: May 14, 2018; Label: Wavy Gang; Format: Digital download, streaming	—
Live from the House	Released: October 31, 2018; Label: Wavy Gang; Format: Digital download, streaming	—
For You	Released: April 17, 2020; Label: Wavy Gang; Format: Digital download, streaming	—
Unfuckwitable	Released: February 12, 2021; Label: Wavy Gang, Empire; Format: Digital download, streaming	128

=== Charted and certified singles ===
Title	Year	Peak chart positions	Certifications	Album
Title	Year	US Bub.	Certifications	Album
"Real Niggas Don't Rap"	2021	—	RIAA: Gold	Unfuckwitable
"What Business Is"	2021	—	RIAA: Gold	Non-album single
"Family > Money"	2022	—	RIAA: Gold	Face
"Ron Artest" (with 42 Dugg)	2023	24	RIAA: Platinum	Non-album single
