= YKNiece =

American rapper

- Born: Shanice Cameron; 2003 or 2004 (age 22–23)
- Origin: Atlanta, Georgia, US
- Genres: Southern hip-hop; trap
- Occupations: Rapper; songwriter
- Instrument: Vocals
- Years active: 2025–present
- Label: Gaijin

Shanice Cameron, known professionally as YKNiece, is an American rapper from Atlanta, Georgia, best known for her 2025 single "Whim Whamiee" (with fellow Atlanta rapper Pluto), which peaked at number 51 on the Billboard Hot 100.

Also in 2025, Cameron appeared on the single "Friend Do Remix" with Belly Gang Kushington, as well as "Take Me Thru Dere" (with Metro Boomin, Quavo, and Breskii), the latter of which peaked at 51 on the Hot 100.

== Early life ==
Cameron attended Maynard H. Jackson High School. After high school, Cameron enrolled at Columbus State University, where she majored in nursing before dropping out due to the COVID-19 pandemic.

== Career ==
Prior to beginning her rap career, Cameron worked as a package handler for Pepsi. She made her debut in February 2025 with the track "Whim Whamiee", which featured her as a lead artist alongside rapper Pluto. The song became a breakout hit for both artists, peaking at number 51 on the Billboard Hot 100. Shortly after the track's success, Cameron signed with Gaijin Records, who released her debut solo single "Pressure" in May 2025. That same month, she featured on the track "Innit" with BunnaB, which went viral on social media. In August, she appeared on the track "Take Me Thru Dere" alongside Metro Boomin, Quavo and Breskii, which peaked at number 51 on the Hot 100 and reached the top spot on Billboard's Rhythmic Airplay chart, giving Cameron her first number one on any major music chart. In September 2025, she was featured on the remix of "Friend Do" by fellow Atlanta rapper Belly Gang Kushington, which peaked at number six on Billboard's Bubbling Under Hot 100 chart.

In May 2026, Cameron was featured on the remix of DaBaby's track "Pop Dat Thang," alongside GloRilla and Yung Miami. That same month, she received three nominations at the 2026 BET Awards. She was also nominated for Best Female Hip-Hop Artist and Best Hip-Hop Song ("Take Me Thru Dere") at the American Music Awards of 2026.

== Artistry ==
Cameron has cited Cardi B and Fridayy as influences on her music.

== Discography ==
=== Singles ===
List of singles, with selected peak chart positions
Title	Year	Peak chart positions				Album
Title	Year	US	US R&B/HH	US Rhy.	NZ Hot	Album
"Whim Whamiee" (with Pluto)	2025	51	12	28	36	Both Ways
"Pressure"	2025	—	—	—	—	Non-album single
"Innit" (with BunnaB)	2025	—	—	—	—	Bunna Summa
"Friend Do Remix" (with Belly Gang Kushington)	2025	— (Note: "Friend Do" did not enter the Billboard Hot 100, but peaked at number six on the Bubbling Under Hot 100 chart.)	27	8	—	The Streets is Yours: The Re-Up
"Tammat Nun"	2025	—	—	—	—	Non-album single
"Take Me Thru Dere" (with Metro Boomin, Quavo and Breskii)	2025	51	10	1	—	A Futuristic Summa
"Show Out" (with Big Boogie, Lil Jon and J. White Did It)	2025	—	—	—	—	Pain on Paper 4
"Boat Remix" (with Trim and BunnaB)	2025	—	—	—	—	TBA
"Goin On"	2026	—	—	—	—	Non-album single
"Pop Dat Thang (Remix)" (with DaBaby and GloRilla featuring Yung Miami)	2026	—	—	—	—	TBA

=== Guest appearances ===
Title	Year	Other artist(s)	Album
"BBO (Simon Says)"	2025	Kevin Gates	Luca Brasi 4
"Chicken Talkin Bastard"	2026	BossMan Dlow	Chicken Talkin Bastard
