= Trim (American rapper) =

American rapper (born 2005)

- Also known as: Ms. Trim
- Born: Ahlaisha Kornickey; 2006 or 2007 (age 19–20)
- Origin: Charleston, South Carolina, US
- Genre: Hip-hop
- Occupation: Rapper
- Years active: 2024–present
- Label: BuVision

Ahlaisha Kornickey, known professionally as Trim, is an American rapper. She is best known for her 2025 single "Boat" (remixed featuring YKNiece and BunnaB or Pooh Shiesty), which entered the Hot R&B/Hip-Hop Songs chart.

== Early life ==
Ahlaisha Kornickey was raised in Charleston, South Carolina. She listened to hip-hop and R&B music growing up and planned to become a makeup and hair stylist before starting her music career.

== Career ==
Kornickey began rapping in 2024 and released freestyles on TikTok. Her song "Timbs" with fellow South Carolina rapper Ashswervo gained local attention, leading to a distribution deal with BuVision. She released her debut EP, SC Princess, in 2025. Her breakout single "Boat" was released in 2025. Remixes of the song featuring rappers YK Niece and BunnaB and Pooh Shiesty were released following the song's virality on TikTok. In 2026, she released the singles "Bad Ho's", "Floor", "Guapo", "Chröme" with Slayr, "No Trick" with Luh Tyler, and "Coconut Water". She performed at the Rolling Loud festival in May 2026. She was featured in the 2026 XXL Freshman Class list in June 2026.

== Artistry ==
Kornickey raps in a Gullah Geechee accent. She has cited YoungBoy Never Broke Again and Future as influences on her music.

== Discography ==
=== EPs ===
List of extended plays, with selected details
Title	Details
SC Princess	Released: August 31, 2025; Format: Digital download, streaming; Label: Self-released

=== Singles ===
==== As lead artist ====
List of singles, showing year released and album name
Title	Year	Peak chart positions		Album
Title	Year	US R&B/HH	US Rhy.	Album
"Way 2 Bad"	2024	—	—	Non-album singles
"Auntie"	2025	—	—	Non-album singles
"Maybach"	2025	—	—	Non-album singles
"Rocket"	2025	—	—	Non-album singles
"Leaning Too"	2025	—	—	Non-album singles
"Timbs" (featuring Ashswervo)	2025	—	—	Non-album singles
"Wat Dat Pose to Mean"	2025	—	—	Non-album singles
"Frm 843" (featuring Nicknxtdoor! & Ashswervo)	2025	—	—	Im Frm 843
"Mini Skirt"	2025	—	—	Non-album singles
"Ukraine"	2025	—	—	Non-album singles
"Bugatti"	2025	—	—	SC Princess
"Fenty"	2025	—	—	Non-album singles
"Pretty Skin"	2025	—	—	Non-album singles
"Nobody" (solo or featuring Monaleo & G Herbo)	2025	—	—	Non-album singles
"Taxi"	2025	—	—	Non-album singles
"Putting Ya Dine (remix)"	2025	—	—	Non-album singles
"Boat" (solo or featuring YKNiece & BunnaB or Pooh Shiesty)	2025	40	—	Non-album singles
"Bad Ho's" (featuring TrapStaxrC)	2026	—	—	Non-album singles
"Floor"	2026	—	—	Pass the Tiara
"Guapo" (featuring Bankroll Ni, Bri3, and Thickney)	2026	—	—	Pass the Tiara
"Chröme" (featuring Slayr)	2026	—	—	Pass the Tiara
"Coconut Water"	2026	—	11	Pass the Tiara
"Get Hit"	2026	—	—	Pass the Tiara

==== As featured artist ====
List of guest appearances, showing song title, year released, other artists, and album name
Title	Year	Artist(s)	Album
"Trump the Bill"	2025	Sunshine Benzi	Non-album single
"Two"	2025	Jordn	Portrait
"Checkmate" (remix)	2025	Lo Cue	Non-album single
"Disco Wit a Glock" (remix)	2025	Vayda	Don't Lose The Groove
"Trimney"	2026	Thickney	Non-album single
"M.O.N"	2026	Pretti Montana	Checkmate
"No Trick"	2026	Luh Tyler	Destined for Greatness
