= Friend Do =

2025 single by Belly Gang Kushington

Single by Belly Gang Kushington featuring YKNiece

from the album The Streets Is Yours
- Released: September 5, 2025
- Genre: Hip-hop
- Length: 2:51
- Label: Love Renaissance
- Songwriters: Victor Thomas; Deontevius Houston
- Producer: Dsheats

Belly Gang Kushington singles chronology
"Literally" (2025)	"Friend Do" (2025)	"Break Up Interlude" (2025)

YKNiece singles chronology
"Month Or 2 (Lala)" (2025)	"Friend Do (Remix)" (2025)	"Tammat Nun" (2025)

Music video
- "Friend Do (Remix)" on YouTube

"Friend Do" is a song by American rapper Belly Gang Kushington from his debut studio album, The Streets Is Yours (2025). Considered his breakout hit, it was produced by Dsheats. An official remix of the song featuring American rapper YKNiece was released on September 5, 2025, helping it gain widespread recognition, and serves as the lead single from the album's deluxe edition The Streets Is Yours: The Re-Up (2025). The song centers around twerking and drug dealing; by the end of 2025 to early 2026, it became the most played song at strip clubs in Atlanta.

== Background ==
In an interview with Hot 97, Belly Gang Kushington explained that when he wrote the song, he did not intend for it to become a strip club anthem. The song began increasing in popularity following the release of The Streets Is Yours, with the remix significantly contributing to its success.

== Charts ==
Weekly chart performance for "Friend Do"
Chart (2025–2026)	Peak position
US Bubbling Under Hot 100 (Billboard)	6
US Hot R&B/Hip-Hop Songs (Billboard)	27
US Rhythmic Airplay (Billboard)	8
