= Take Me Thru Dere =

2025 song by Metro Boomin, Quavo, Breskii and YK Niece

Single by Metro Boomin, Quavo, Breskii and YKNiece

from the album A Futuristic Summa
- Released: October 2, 2025
- Length: 2:42
- Label: Boominati; Mercury; Republic
- Songwriters: Leland Wayne; Quavious Marshall; Brianna Cody; Jada Smith; Bobby Turner
- Producers: Metro Boomin; Bobby Kritical

Metro Boomin singles chronology
"Slide" (2025)	"Take Me Thru Dere" (2025)

Music video
- "Take Me Thru Dere" on YouTube

"Take Me Thru Dere" is a song by American record producer Metro Boomin and American rappers Quavo, Breskii and YKNiece. It was released through Boominati Worldwide, Mercury, and Republic Records as the second single from Metro Boomin's second commercial mixtape, A Futuristic Summa, on October 2, 2025.

== Composition and critical reception ==
The song uses an early 2000s sound and "springy" steel drums. Mackenzie Cummings-Grady of Billboard ranked "Take Me Thru Dere" as the sixth best song from A Futuristic Summa. Kenyatta Victoria of Ebony wrote "The infectious beats and catchy hooks make 'Take Me Thru Dere' not only a dance anthem but also a cultural touchstone that highlights the regional music scenes. Metro Boomin's ability to curate such collaborations demonstrates his commitment to uplifting artists and celebrating their contributions to the genre."

== Music video ==
The music video was released on October 2, 2025. Filmed in Atlanta, Georgia, it sees the rappers partying in a park, complete with dance squads and a bounce house.

== Critical reception ==
HotNewHipHop ranked the song as the 19th best rap song of 2025.

== Charts ==
Chart performance for "Take Me Thru Dere"
Chart (2025–2026)	Peak position
US Billboard Hot 100	51
US Hot R&B/Hip-Hop Songs (Billboard)	10
US Rhythmic Airplay (Billboard)	1
