= Coconut Water =

Coconut Water may refer to:

- Coconut water, the liquid inside a coconut
- "Coconut Water", a song by Milk & Bone from the 2015 album Little Mourning
- "Coconut Water", a 2026 song by Trim
