= Boat (Trim song) =

2025 single by Trim

Single by Trim
- Released: November 28, 2025
- Recorded: 2025
- Length: 3:27
- Label: Self-released
- Songwriter: Ahlaisha Kornickey
- Producer: Freddy2smoove

Trim singles chronology
"Putting Ya Dine" (Remix) (2025)	"Boat" (2025)	"Trump the Bill" (Trim Edition) (2025)

Pooh Shiesty singles chronology
"FDO" (2025)	"Boat" (Slimey Edition) (2025)

Music video
- "Boat" (Slimey Edition) on YouTube

"Boat" is a song by American rapper Trim, released on November 28, 2025. The track is widely regarded as her breakout single, gaining viral traction on social media. The song spawned two official remixes: one featuring Atlanta-based rappers YK Niece and BunnaB, and another featuring Memphis rapper Pooh Shiesty.

== Release and promotion ==
Trim released the song on November 28, 2025. On December 23, 2025, Trim released a remix of the song featuring rappers YK Niece and BunnaB, accompanied by a music video. A second remix featuring Memphis rapper Pooh Shiesty was released on March 20, 2026, alongside an additional music video.

=== Virality ===
The song was amplified by celebrity engagement with artists such Tyla, Baby Tate, and Rico Nasty. The track garnered widespread attention on TikTok, accumulating over 10 million likes by February 2026.

== Composition ==
"Boat" is a hip-hop track with "addictive clap patterns" and "deep and growling bass and kicks." Chase Iseghohi of Hot 100.9 wrote that the song was about "confidence and boss energy". Trim's "sharp delivery" and "expressive mannerisms" drew comparisons to Nicki Minaj on social media.

== Music videos ==
A music video for the remix of "Boat" featuring YK Niece and BunnaB was released on December 23, 2025. It features the three on a yacht. A second music video, supporting the remix featuring Pooh Shiesty, was released on March 20, 2026.

== Track listing ==
- Original version
1. "Boat" – 3:27
- Remixes
1. "Boat Remix" (featuring YK Niece & BunnaB) – 2:43
2. "Boat Remix" (Slimey Edition) (featuring Pooh Shiesty) – 2:36

== Credits and personnel ==
Credits were adapted from Spotify.

- Trim – vocals, songwriting, engineering
- Frederick Lukoki – songwriting, composer
- Freddy2smoove – production, programming
- Taylor Sader – vocal engineering
- Jonathan 'Jayo' Henry – engineering
- Alex Gamble – mixing, mastering

== Charts ==
Chart performance for "Boat"
Chart (2026)	Peak position
US Hot R&B/Hip-Hop Songs (Billboard)	40

== Release history ==
Release dates and formats
Region	Date	Format	Version	Label
Various	November 28, 2025	Digital download; streaming	Original	Self-released
Various	December 23, 2025	Digital download; streaming	Remix	Self-released
Various	March 20, 2026	Digital download; streaming	Slimey Edition	Self-released
