= Pop Dat Thang =

2026 single by DaBaby

Single by DaBaby

from the album Be More Grateful
- Released: January 23, 2026
- Genre: Hip-hop; Miami bass
- Length: 2:18
- Label: South Coast; Interscope
- Songwriters: Jonathan Kirk; Anthony Mosley; Adam Gamble; Tobias Wincorn; Vaughn Oliver
- Producers: Sean da Firzt; KayoTheWizard; Wincorn; Oliver

DaBaby singles chronology
"Don't Insult Me" (2026)	"Pop Dat Thang" (2026)

"Pop Dat Thang" is a song by American rapper DaBaby, released on January 23, 2026 as the sixth single from his fifth studio album, Be More Grateful (2026). It was produced by Sean da Firzt, KayoTheWizard, Tobias Wincorn and Vaughn Oliver.

An official remix was released on May 1, 2026, featuring female rappers GloRilla, YKNiece and Yung Miami.

== Composition ==
"Pop Dat Thang" is a fast-paced song that is described as "club-ready", high-energy and suitable for strip clubs. It features an uptempo beat, "heavy bounce", and sampled vocals. DaBaby raps about a woman who attracts him through her dancing style. He uses sexually explicit language to convey a sense of dominance.

== Critical reception ==
Alexander Cole of HotNewHipHop considered the song a great example of DaBaby switching his sound, writing "we get a more toned-down DaBaby, although it just works. From the sampled vocals in the production to DaBaby's subdued flow, it is clear that he is trying something new. In our estimation, this is working quite beautifully."

== Charts ==
Chart performance for "Pop Dat Thang"
Chart (2026)	Peak position
Australia (ARIA)	45
Australia Hip Hop/R&B (ARIA)	5
Canada Hot 100 (Billboard)	49
Costa Rica Anglo Airplay (Monitor Latino)	10
Global 200 (Billboard)	126
Ireland (IRMA)	50
New Zealand (Recorded Music NZ)	40
UK Singles (Official Charts)	86
US Billboard Hot 100	26
US Hot R&B/Hip-Hop Songs (Billboard)	5
US Rhythmic Airplay (Billboard)	1
US R&B/Hip-Hop Airplay (Billboard)	5

== Certifications ==
Region	Certification	Certified units/sales
New Zealand (RMNZ)	Gold	15,000^{‡}
United States (RIAA)	Platinum	1,000,000^{‡}
^{‡} Sales+streaming figures based on certification alone.
