= Feeling on My Body =

2025 single by Taffy featuring Miss Asia

Single by Taffy featuring Miss Asia
- Released: August 26, 2025
- Genre: Hip-hop
- Length: 2:38
- Label: Self-released
- Songwriters: Monique Keene; Asia Foutner
- Producer: DJ Mr Rodgers

Taffy singles chronology
"Birthday Song" (2025)	"Feeling on My Body" (2025)	"Whim Whamiee (Remix)" (2025)

Miss Asia singles chronology
"Get Cake" (2025)	"Feeling on My Body" (2025)	"Alot" (2025)

Music video
- "Feeling on My Body" on YouTube

Remix cover
- Cover art of the official remix with Pluto.

Pluto singles chronology
"Mrs. P" (2025)	"Feeling on My Body (Remix)" (2025)	"Live in a World" (2026)

Music video
- "Feeling on My Body (Remix)" on YouTube

"Feeling on My Body" is a song by American rapper Taffy featuring American rapper Miss Asia, released on August 26, 2025. It is considered the breakout hit of both artists. An official remix with American rapper Pluto was released on December 4, 2025 and went viral on the video-sharing app TikTok, propelling the song to further recognition.

== TikTok virality ==
On January 5, 2025, a pair of TikTok users created a partnered dance trend to the song. By the next week, their dance reached over 1.7 million views and the song was used in over 57,300 posts. Celebrity couples have also participated in the trend, including Serena Page and Kordell Beckham from the dating reality show Love Island.

== Commercial performance ==
According to Luminate, the song collected 298,000 official on-demand U.S. streams during the period of January 2–5, 2026. Within the four days following the start of the dance trend, it increased to 817,000 streams.

== Charts ==
Chart performance for "Feeling on My Body"
Chart (2026)	Peak position
US Bubbling Under Hot 100 Singles (Billboard)	1
US Hot R&B/Hip-Hop Songs (Billboard)	28
