= List of artists who reached number one on the U.S. Rhythmic chart =

This is a list of recording artists who have reached number one on Billboard's Rhythmic chart. Billboard began ranking Rhythmic music in the issue dated October 3, 1992, based on weekly radio airplay as based on data from Nielsen Broadcast Data Systems.

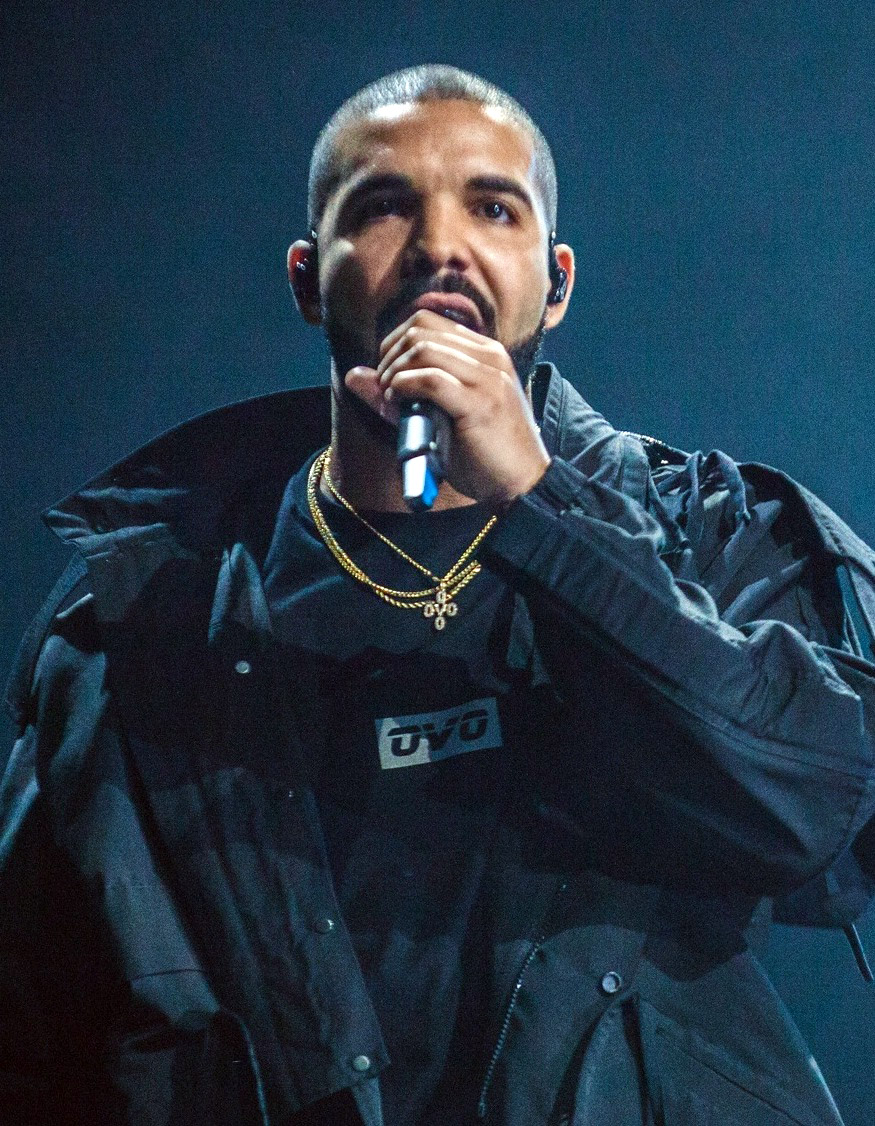
With a total of 46 songs, Drake holds the record for the most number-one songs.

- All acts are listed alphabetically.
- Solo artists are alphabetized by last name, groups by group name excluding "A," "An" and "The."
- Each act's total of number one Rhythmic hits is shown after their name.
- All artists who are mentioned in song credits are listed here; this includes one-time pairings of otherwise solo artists and those appearing as "featured".
- Many artists and producers use aliases and pseudonyms - this list shows whichever artist name was used on the record.
- Artists associated with a group who reached number one, yet have their own solo page in Wikipedia are not listed here, unless they hit number one as a solo artist.

== 0-9 ==
- 2 Chainz (3)
- 6lack (1)
- 21 Savage (8)
- 24kGoldn (1)
- 50 Cent (8)
- 112 (2)
- 310babii (1)
- 702 (1)

== A ==
- A Boogie wit da Hoodie (1)
- Aaliyah (4)
- Jordan Adetunji (1)
- Afrojack (2)
- Christina Aguilera (3)
- Jhené Aiko (4)
- Akon (5)
- Ali & Gipp (1)
- All-4-One (2)
- AlunaGeorge (1)
- Aqua (1)
- ASAP Rocky (1)
- Ashanti (3)
- Iggy Azalea (3)
- AzChike (1)

== B ==
- Max B (1)
- B2K (1)
- Cardi B (12)
- Bad Bunny (2)
- Bad Meets Evil (1)
- J Balvin (1)
- Lou Bega (1)
- Belly (1)
- Lauren Bennett (1)
- Beyoncé (12)
- Bia (1)
- Justin Bieber (6)
- Big Sean (5)
- Blackstreet (2)
- The Black Eyed Peas (1)
- Blaque (1)
- Mary J. Blige (2)
- Blxst (1)
- B.o.B (1)
- Bone Thugs-N-Harmony (1)
- Bow Wow (4)
- Breskii (1)
- Burna Boy (1)
- Momo Boyd (1)
- Boyz II Men (4)
- Brandy (4)
- Toni Braxton (1)
- Chris Brown (16)
- Burna Boy (1)
- Busta Rhymes (1)

== C ==
- Camila Cabello (2)
- Daniel Caesar (1)
- Athena Cage (1)
- Alessia Cara (1)
- Mariah Carey (7)
- Playboi Carti (1)
- Cassie (1)
- The Cataracs (1)
- Chamillionaire (1)
- Chance the Rapper (2)
- Charli XCX (1)
- Central Cee (1)
- Yuki Chiba (1)
- Chingy (3)
- JNR CHOI (1)
- Ciara (3)
- City Girls (2)
- City Spud (1)
- CJ (1)
- CKay (1)
- J. Cole (5)
- Billy Ray Cyrus (1)

== D ==
- D12 (1)
- DaBaby (5)
- Da Brat (1)
- Daft Punk (2)
- Ray Dalton (1)
- David Banner (1)
- Dem Franchize Boyz (1)
- Jason DeRulo (2)
- Destiny's Child (3)
- Dev (1)
- DJ Khaled (7)
- DJ Snake (2)
- Iann Dior (1)
- BossMan Dlow (1)
- Doja Cat (12)
- Doechii (3)
- Dr. Dre (1)
- Drake (46)
- DRAM (1)
- The-Dream (1)
- Dru Hill (1)

== E ==
- E-40 (2)
- Ella Mai (1)
- Missy Elliott (3)
- Eminem (6)
- En Vogue (2)
- Enya (1)
- Faith Evans (1)
- Eve (1)

== F ==
- Fabolous (2)
- Far East Movement (1)
- Fat Joe (1)
- Fetty Wap (2)
- Lupe Fiasco (1)
- Field Mob (1)
- Fifth Harmony (1)
- Flo Rida (4)
- Jamie Foxx (3)
- The Fugees (1)
- Future (6)

== G ==
- G-Eazy (2)
- The Game (2)
- Gelo (1)
- Ginuwine (1)
- Giveon (1)
- GloRilla (2)
- Selena Gomez (1)
- GoonRock (1)
- Ariana Grande (3)
- Layton Greene (1)
- Gucci Mane (3)
- David Guetta (1)
- Lefty Gunplay (1)
- Gunna (4)

== H ==
- Brandy "Ms. B" Hambrick (1)
- Jack Harlow (4)
- Calvin Harris (1)
- H.E.R. (1)
- Lauryn Hill (1)
- Keri Hilson (1)
- Whitney Houston (6)
- Adina Howard (1)

== I ==
- Internet Money (1)
- ILoveMakonnen (1)
- Iyaz (1)

== J ==
- Ja Rule (5)
- Jade (1)
- Janet Jackson (2)
- Michael Jackson (1)
- Jay-Z (9)
- Jeremih (4)
- JID (1)
- Jodeci (1)
- Kent Jones (1)
- Majid Jordan (1)
- Montell Jordan (1)
- Juice WRLD (1)
- Juicy J (2)
- Juvenile (1)

== K ==
- Ini Kamoze (1)
- Kardinal Offishall (1)
- K-Ci & JoJo (2)
- Baby Keem (1)
- Kehlani (2)
- Kelis (1)
- R. Kelly (2)
- Alicia Keys (2)
- Khalid (2)
- Kid Cudi (1)
- Kid Ink (1)
- Sean Kingston (1)
- Kirko Bangz (1)
- Kodak Black (3)
- Krayzie Bone (1)
- Kelly Rowland (1)
- Kyle (1)

== L ==
- Kendrick Lamar (12)
- Tory Lanez (2)
- Natalie La Rose (1)
- Latto (1)
- Lea (1)
- Steve Lacy (1)
- Murphy Lee (1)
- John Legend (1)
- Coi Leray (1)
- Ryan Lewis (2)
- Lil Baby (4)
- Lil Durk (2)
- Lil' Flip (1)
- Lil Jon & the East Side Boyz (4)
- Lil' Kim (2)
- Lil' Mo (2)
- Lil Mosey (1)
- Lil Nas X (3)
- Lil Peanut & Charlay (1)
- Lil Tecca (1)
- Lil Tjay (1)
- Lil Uzi Vert (2)
- Lil Wayne (13)
- Lil Yachty (2)
- Lizzo (2)
- LL Cool J (1)
- Lloyd (2)
- LMFAO (1)
- Loon (1)
- Jennifer Lopez (5)
- Ludacris (6)

== M ==
- Machine Gun Kelly (1)
- Macklemore (2)
- Yung Miami (1)
- Post Malone (10)
- Mariah the Scientist (1)
- Mario (1)
- Bruno Mars (14)
- Ricky Martin (1)
- Tim McGraw (1)
- Brian McKnight (3)
- Meek Mill (1)
- Megan Thee Stallion (1)
- Metro Boomin (3)
- Miguel (1)
- Migos (2)
- Mims (1)
- Nicki Minaj (12)
- MoKenStef (1)
- Moliy (1)
- Monica (4)
- Monifah (1)
- French Montana (3)
- Monty (1)
- Mark Morrison (1)
- Mustard (3)
- Mýa (3)

== N ==
- Nate Dogg (1)
- Nav
- Nayer (1)
- Nelly (7)
- N.E.R.D (1)
- Next (1)
- Ne-Yo (7)
- Nico & Vinz (1)
- YK Niece (1)

== O ==
- Offset (2)
- Olivia (1)
- Omarion (2)
- OMI (1)
- Rita Ora (1)
- OutKast (2)

== P ==
- Petey Pablo (1)
- PartyNextDoor (1)
- Sean Paul (2)
- Sean Paul of the YoungBloodz (1)
- Katy Perry (2)
- Pharrell (Williams) (4)
- Pink (2)
- PinkPantheress (1)
- Pitbull (3)
- PJ (1)
- Playboi Carti (2)
- Plies (1)
- PnB Rock (1)
- Popcaan (1)
- Polo G (1)
- Pop Smoke (3)
- Portrait (1)
- Puff Daddy/P.Diddy/Diddy (4)
- Pusha T (1)
- Charlie Puth (1)

== Q ==
- Quavo (3)

== R ==
- Rae Sremmurd (1)
- Ray J (1)
- Rayvon (1)
- Redman (1)
- Rema (1)
- Bebe Rexha (2)
- Roddy Ricch (6)
- Tony Rich Project (1)
- Tommy Richman (1)
- Rihanna (17)
- RikRok (1)
- Rick Ross (2)
- Mark Ronson (1)
- Kelly Rowland (1)
- Tammi Ruggeri (1)
- Russ (1)

== S ==
- Sammie (1)
- Salt-N-Pepa (2)
- Saweetie (4)
- Schoolboy Q (1)
- Mariah the Scientist (1)
- Travis Scott (8)
- Jay Sean (1)
- Sexyy Red (3)
- Shaggy (2)
- Shai (1)
- Shakira (1)
- Shawnna (1)
- Shenseea (1)
- Shop Boyz (1)
- Mike Shorey (1)
- Sia (1)
- Silent Addy (1)
- Silk (1)
- Silk Sonic (2)
- Sisqo (1)
- Skillibeng (1)
- Slim Thug (1)
- Will Smith (1)
- Snoop Dogg (4)
- Somethin' for the People (1)
- Trey Songz (4)
- Soul For Real (1)
- Soulja Boy Tell Em (2)
- Soulja Slim (1)
- Spice Girls (1)
- Ice Spice (3)
- Megan Thee Stallion (3)
- Static Major (1)
- Gwen Stefani (1)
- Swae Lee (2)
- Keith Sweat (2)
- SWV (2)
- SZA (8)

== T ==
- Takeoff (1)
- Baby Tate (1)
- Tems (1)
- Terror Squad (1)
- Leon Thomas (2)
- T.I. (5)
- Robin Thicke (1)
- Sam Tompkins (1)
- Bryson Tiller (2)
- Justin Timberlake (5)
- Tinashe (1)
- TLC (5)
- Too Short (1)
- T-Pain (6)
- Don Toliver (2)
- Trina & Tamera (1)
- Twista (1)
- Ty Dolla $ign (4)
- Tyga (5)
- Tyla (2)
- Tyler, the Creator (2)
- Tyrese (1)

== U ==
- Kali Uchis (2)
- UGK (1)
- Usher (13)
- Lil Uzi Vert (1)

== V ==
- Vita (1)

== W ==
- Wale (1)
- Summer Walker (1)
- Paul Wall (1)
- Wanz (1)
- The Weeknd (16)
- Kanye West (6)
- Mario Winans (2)
- will.i.am (1)
- Wiz Khalifa (3)

== X ==
- Xscape (1)

== Y ==
- YG (3)
- Young Berg (1)
- Young Jeezy (1)
- Young Money (1)
- Young Thug (3)
- Yung Bleu (1)
- Yung Joc (4)

== Z ==
- Zacari (1)
- Arizona Zervas (1)
