= Maynard H. Jackson High School =

Public high school in Atlanta, Georgia, United States

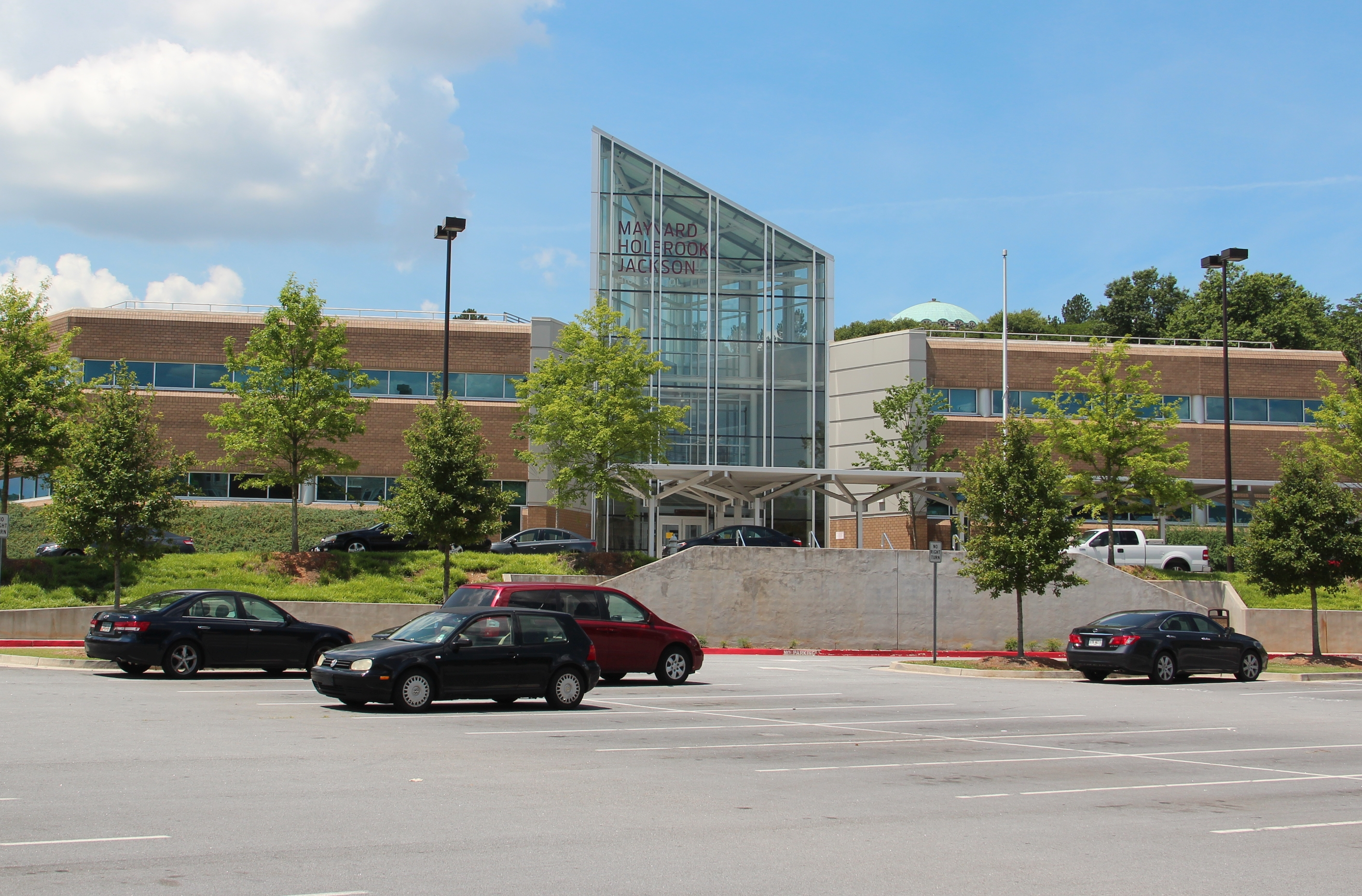
- Maynard H. Jackson High School in 2016

Location
- 801 Glenwood Avenue Southeast; Atlanta, Georgia; United States; 33°44′21″N 84°21′43″W

Information
- Type: Public secondary
- Established: 2008
- School district: Atlanta Public Schools
- Principal: Dr. Kimberly Latchman (Interim)
- Faculty: 120
- Teaching staff: 115.20 (FTE)
- Grades: 9–12
- Enrollment: 1,551 (2023-2024)
- Student to teacher ratio: 13.45
- Campus: Urban
- Colors: Crimson and gold
- Mascot: Jaguars
- Website: mhjackson.atlantapublicschools.us

Maynard H. Jackson High School (MJHS, or Jackson High) is a high school of 1,551 students, with the capacity for 1,500. Jackson High is located in southeast Atlanta, Georgia, United States along the BeltLine in Grant Park, just south of I-20. The school is a part of Atlanta Public Schools. In July 2017, Adam Danser was appointed as principal.

Jackson High offers the International Baccalaureate (IB) Diploma Programme and IB Career Programme to all students.

== History ==
In 1872, the Atlanta Public Schools commenced operations with seven schools, including Girls High. In 1924, the city opened a new Girls High facility in Grant Park. In 1947, the Atlanta Board of Education moved to community high schools, and transitioned the Girls High building into Roosevelt High. Roosevelt High served as a community high school to Grant Park and surrounding neighborhoods from 1947 until 1985.

The school's current campus opened as Southside High School in the second semester of 1986 on the site overlooked by the former Girls High / Roosevelt High. Southside consolidated the former Roosevelt High and the former Hoke Smith High. In 1988, nearby East Atlanta High closed, with East Atlanta students rezoned to Southside. In 2005, Southside's boundary expanded further on the transition of Kirkwood's of Alonzo A Crim from a comprehensive high to an open campus. In 2002, the school was designated a GE Foundation "College Bound" school and received a five-year, $1 million grant to help increase student readiness for college courses.

In April 2007, under the administration of Beverly Hall, APS began a districtwide initiative to transition all high schools to Small Learning Communities funded in part by a grant from the Gates Foundation. For several years following this initiative, faculty and students at Jackson High operate in three Small Learning Communities, also known as SLCs: Engineering and Early College, Information Technology, and Fine Arts. Jackson High was one of the first APS high schools to transition away from the SLC model that has now been rejected as an approach to reform by Gates Foundation among others.

In the summer of 2008, the school was renamed Maynard H. Jackson High School to commemorate the city's first black mayor, Maynard Jackson. In early 2012, Jackson High hosted a tribute to Maynard Jackson, including a special archive sponsored by the Maynard Jackson Youth Foundation.

In the summer of 2012, the school relocated temporarily to the campus of Coan Middle School for a 13-month renovation. Students returned to the original Grant Park location on January 8, 2014, for the spring semester. The $48.3 million renovation included a rooftop community farm and garden, renovated auditorium, new softball field, and new classroom corridors.

In fall 2012, Stephanie Johnson was appointed as the new principal at Jackson High School. At the time of Principal Johnson's arrival, the school only enrolled 971 students. Under Principal Johnson's tenure, school spirit and student performance rose dramatically. As the school became a more attractive destination, enrollment increased and also diversified. The changes lead to the selection of Principal Johnson as Georgia's Principal of the Year as well as one of 3 finalists for national Principal of the Year in 2017.

== International Baccalaureate ==
All students at Jackson High participate in the IB MYP program during 9th and 10th grades. Commencing in August 2013, 11th grade students began to earn the IB diploma. A few years later, the school launched the IB Career option. As of the 2023–24 school year, in a class of 397 rising juniors, 60 opted into IB Diploma, 88 opted into IB Career, and another 6 students registered for an IB Language course bringing the IB participation level to approximately 40 percent of all students.

== Extracurricular activities ==
Maynard H. Jackson High School has many athletic and academic organizations. The school has a large U.S. Army JROTC program. Other extracurriculars include marching band, drill team, orchestra, chorus, drama, and various academic clubs.

The school fields athletics teams in most high school sports. Fall sports: Boys Football, Cross Country, Girls Softball, Girls Volleyball, Cheer and Girls Flag Football. Winter sports: Basketball, Swimming and Diving, Cheer, Wrestling and Riflery. Spring sports: Soccer, Track and Field, Boys Baseball, Lacrosse, Tennis, Golf and Ultimate Frisbee. Except where noted, all sports are offered either co-ed or with both Boys and Girls teams operating in the same season. The girls track and field team won state titles in 2015, 2016, 2018 and 2022. In 2023, Girls Basketball advanced to the GHSA Final Four in 5A. In 2024, Boys and Girls Basketball both advanced to the GHSA Final Four in 5A, with the Lady Jags Girls Basketball team advancing to finals.

== Dress code ==
For 10 years, the school required a uniform. In 2023, this shifted instead to a dress code with minimal rules.

== Feeder patterns ==
Beginning in fall 2013, Atlanta Public Schools shifted its feeder patterns to a cluster model so that students who began together in kindergarten would all be zoned to the same middle school and high school. Jackson High School's attendance zone mirrors the zone of King Middle School. The elementary school zones that align to MJHS: Benteen Elementary, Burgess-Peterson Academy, Dunbar Elementary, Parkside Elementary, Barack and Michelle Obama Academy and Toomer Elementary. There are two Atlanta Public Schools charter schools located within the Jackson High Zone: Atlanta Neighborhood Charter School and Drew Charter. Many students from these schools also attend MJHS.

== Notable alumni ==
- Greg Favors - football player, Kansas City Chiefs, 1998; Tennessee Titans, 1999-2001; Indianapolis Colts, 2002; Buffalo Bills, 2002; Louisville Cardinals, 2003; Jacksonville Jaguars, 2004–2005
- Hassan Hall - football player, Louisville Cardinals, Cleveland Browns
- Lorenzo Mauldin - football player, Louisville Cardinals, New York Jets
- YKNiece - Rapper
- YFN Lucci - Rapper
- BunnaB - Rapper known for song Bunna Summa
