= Soak City (Do It) =

2023 single by 310babii

Single by 310babii

from the album Lottery Pick & Nights and Weekends
- Released: June 3, 2023
- Recorded: June 2023
- Length: 2:03
- Label: High IQ; Empire
- Songwriter: Kameron Milner
- Producers: Donez; KreepTeam

310babii singles chronology
"Ducking Crash" (2023)	"Soak City (Do It)" (2023)	"Ms. Nasty (Remix)" (2023)

Music video
- "Soak City (Do It)" on YouTube

Remix cover
- Cover art of the official remix

"Soak City (Do It)" is a song by American rapper 310babii, released on June 3, 2023 as the lead single from his debut EP Lottery Pick (2023) and his studio album Nights and Weekends (2024). It gained traction on the video-sharing app TikTok and is considered his breakthrough hit. The official remix with American rappers Blueface and Tyga featuring Mustard, OhGeesy and BlueBucksClan was released on September 8, 2023. This song is played by the piano.

== Background ==
In June 2023, 310babii recorded the song through BandLab on his phone in his bedroom. According to him, he freestyled the lyrics and recorded it in 15 to 20 minutes.

== Release and promotion ==
The song was released to streaming services on June 3, 2023. 310babii uploaded a snippet of the song to Instagram, following which it caught the attention of his classmates in Compton, California, who then created a dance challenge for the song on TikTok. As a result, the song quickly became extremely popular and widely used on social media by the general public as well as celebrities, being featured in over 300,000 TikTok creations. This also led to 310babii receiving cosigns from Travis Scott, Russell Westbrook, FIFA and Juventus among others.

== Music video ==
An official music video premiered on August 8, 2023. Directed by Stacking Memories, it sees 310babii enjoying himself at an imaginary Soak City, featuring giant sharks in the sky, color-coordinated dance groups and shots from fisheye lens. 310Babii is seen with sprinkling hoses, water balloon fights and attractive women by the pool, before he is woken up from his daydream by his teacher, who is portrayed by rapper D Smoke. The video also features cameos from Rucci, Famous Uno, RJMrLA, DJ Carisma of Power 106 (who throws the "W" gesture), Tommy the Clown's T-Squad, Storm Debarge, and producers Dupri and Steelz.

== Remix ==
The official remix of the song was released on September 8, 2023 and has guest appearances from Blueface, Tyga, Mustard, OhGeesy and BlueBucksClan. 310babii stated the artists contacted him on Instagram for the collaboration.

== Commercial performance ==
The song and its remix amassed over 30 million combined streams on Spotify and Apple Music in only a few months upon release. According to Luminate, it amassed 5.2 million streams (up 8%) in the United States and 2.5 million radio audience impressions (up 90%) in the November 10–16 tracking week.

The song became 310Babii's first Billboard chart hit in October 2023 when it debuted at number 33 on the TikTok Billboard Top 50, peaking at number 17 by November 18, 2023. By the next week, it debuted at number 100 on the Billboard Hot 100 and number 25 on Rhythmic Airplay, and peaked at number 25 on Hot R&B/Hip-Hop Songs.

== In popular culture ==
The song's remix was featured in the 2026 video game Grand Theft Auto VI, on the radio station Vice City Rap Radio.

== Charts ==
=== Weekly charts ===
Weekly chart performance
Chart (2023–2024)	Peak position
US Billboard Hot 100	53
US Hot R&B/Hip-Hop Songs (Billboard)	17
US Rhythmic (Billboard)	1

=== Year-end charts ===
Year-end chart performance
Chart (2024)	Position
US Hot R&B/Hip-Hop Songs (Billboard)	45
US Radio Songs (Billboard)	72
US Rhythmic (Billboard)	10

== Certifications ==
Region	Certification	Certified units/sales
United States (RIAA)	Platinum	1,000,000^{‡}
^{‡} Sales+streaming figures based on certification alone.
