= Hassan Hall =

American football running back (born 2000)

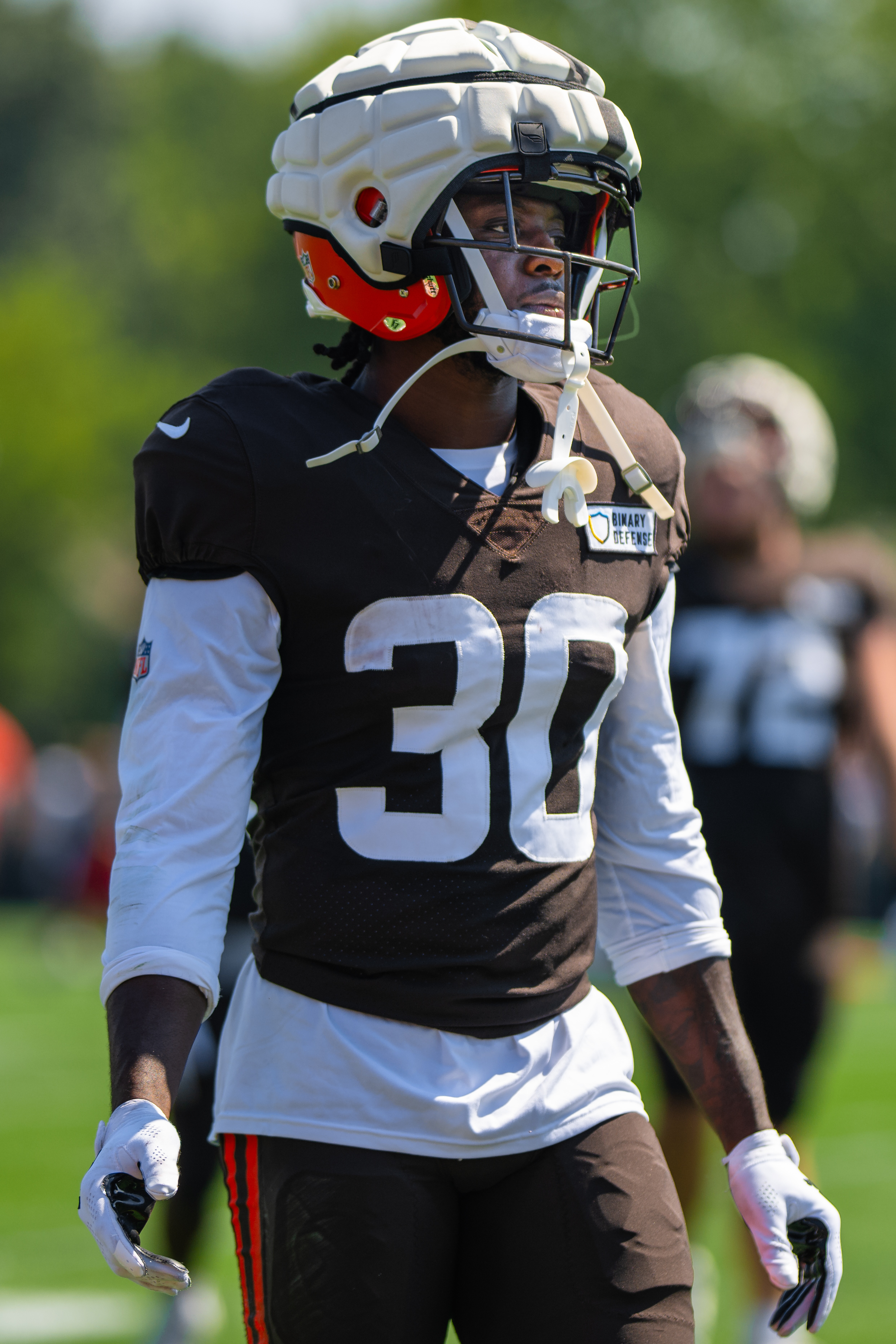
- Hall with the Cleveland Browns in 2023

Profile
- Position: Running back

Personal information
- Born: August 28, 2000 (age 26); Atlanta, Georgia, U.S.
- Listed height: 5 ft 10 in (1.78 m)
- Listed weight: 196 lb (89 kg)

Career information
- High school: Maynard H. Jackson (Atlanta, Georgia)
- College: Louisville (2018–2021); Georgia Tech (2022)
- NFL draft: 2023: undrafted

Career history
- Cleveland Browns (2023)*; Arizona Cardinals (2023)*; New York Giants (2023)*; Kansas City Chiefs (2024)*; Arizona Cardinals (2024)*; San Antonio Brahmas (2025)
- * Offseason or practice squad member only

Awards and highlights
- Second-team All-ACC (2019)
- Stats at Pro Football Reference

Hassan Hall (born August 28, 2000) is an American professional football running back. He played college football for the Louisville Cardinals and Georgia Tech Yellow Jackets.

== Early life ==
Hall grew up in Atlanta, Georgia, and attended Maynard H. Jackson High School, where he played football as a two-way player. As a senior, he racked up 728 yards and five touchdowns on the ground and tallied 98 tackles, 3 interceptions, and ten recovered fumbles on defense. Hall initially committed to Syracuse on August 5, 2017, but decommitted on October 10. Then on October 31, 2017, Hall would make his final decision and committed to play college football at Louisville.

== College career ==
In four years at Louisville, Hall rushed for 1,299 yards and 11 touchdowns on 270 carries and made 22 catches for 175 yards, as well as 2,367 return yards and two touchdowns. His best year came in 2019 where he rushed for 501 yards and 5 touchdowns on 5 carries and caught five passes for 51 yards. He also had 793 return yards and a touchdown. For his performance on the year he was named second-team All-Atlantic Coast Conference (ACC) as an all-purpose back and third-team All-ACC as a returner. On November 11, 2021, with three games left in Louisville's schedule, Hall decided to enter the transfer portal.

On January 11, 2022, Hall announced that he would be transferring to Georgia Tech to play for the Yellow Jackets. In his lone season with Georgia Tech he rushed for a career-high 521 yards on 116 carries and one touchdown and caught 28 passes for 165 yards, earning All-ACC honorable mention at all-purpose back.

== Professional career ==
Pre-draft measurables
Height	Weight	Arm length	Hand span	40-yard dash	10-yard split	20-yard split	20-yard shuttle	Three-cone drill	Vertical jump	Broad jump	Bench press
5 ft 10 1/4 in (1.78 m)	196 lb (89 kg)	30 1/2 in (0.77 m)	9 1/2 in (0.24 m)	4.46 s	1.58 s	2.58 s	4.00 s	7.21 s	37.0 in (0.94 m)	10 ft 10 in (3.30 m)	18 reps
All values from Pro Day

=== Cleveland Browns ===
After not being selected in the 2023 NFL draft, Hall signed a contract with the Cleveland Browns worth $125,000 guaranteed as an undrafted free agent. He was waived on August 29, 2023, and re-signed to the practice squad. He was released from the practice squad on September 26, 2023.

=== Arizona Cardinals (first stint) ===
On November 1, 2023, Hall was signed to the Arizona Cardinals practice squad. He was then released on November 6.

=== New York Giants ===
On November 7, 2023, the New York Giants signed Hall to their practice squad. He was released on November 21.

=== Kansas City Chiefs ===
On January 10, 2024, Hall signed a reserve/future contract with the Kansas City Chiefs. He was waived on June 6.

=== Arizona Cardinals (second stint) ===
On August 13, 2024, Hall signed with the Arizona Cardinals. He was waived on August 27. The Cardinals re-signed Hall to their practice squad on December 31.

=== San Antonio Brahmas ===
Hall signed with the San Antonio Brahmas of the UFL on August 2, 2024. His contract was terminated on August 12 to sign with an NFL team. He re-signed on January 15, 2025.
