= A Futuristic Summa =

Mixtape by Metro Boomin
- Released: August 1, 2025
- Genres: Hip-hop; trap; R&B
- Length: 78:47
- Labels: Boominati; Mercury; Republic
- Producers: Metro Boomin; B Rackz; Bobby Kritical; Chris XZ; DJ Plugg; DJ Spinz; Dre Moon; Honorable C.N.O.T.E.; The Real Mapa; Zaytoven

Metro Boomin chronology
We Still Don't Trust You (2024)	A Futuristic Summa (2025)	God Doesn't Like Ugly (TBA)

A Futuristic Summa (also known as Metro Boomin Presents: A Futuristic Summa (Hosted by DJ Spinz) on the digital version) is the second commercial mixtape (third overall) by the American record producer Metro Boomin. It was released through Boominati Worldwide, Mercury, and Republic Records on August 1, 2025. Hosted by fellow record producer DJ Spinz, it features guest appearances from J Money, Travis Porter, Young Dro, Gucci Mane, Roscoe Dash, Quavo, Breskii, YKNiece, Skooly, Shad da God, Waka Flocka Flame, BunnaB, Meany, Jose Guapo, Rocko, Yung Booke, 2 Chainz, Young Thug, Lil Baby, T.I., 21 Savage, Future, and Yung L.A..

Production was mainly handled by Metro himself, alongside DJ Spinz himself, the Real Mapa, Bobby Kritical, DJ Plugg, Zaytoven, Chris XZ, Honorable C.N.O.T.E., D. Rich, B Rackz, and Dre Moon.

Paying homage to 2010s Atlanta hip-hop with all of the mixtape's guest rappers hailing from there, A Futuristic Summa marks Metro's first solo mixtape in almost twelve years since 19 & Boomin (2013). It follows his two collaborative albums with Future, We Don't Trust You and We Still Don't Trust You (2024).

Professional ratings
Review scores
Source	Rating
Pitchfork	6.8/10

== Track listing ==
A Futuristic Summa track listing – disc 1
No.	Title	Writer(s)	Producer(s)	Length
1.	"Black Migo Forever (Intro)"	Tamaj Pullen	The Real Mapa	0:25
2.	"I Want It All" (with J Money)	Leland Wayne; Jermaine Miller; Bobby Turner; Kenneth Smith	Metro Boomin; Bobby Kritical; DJ Plugg	2:47
3.	"They Wanna Have Fun" (with Travis Porter, Young Dro, and Gucci Mane)	Wayne; Lakeem Grant; Donquez Woods; Harold Duncan; D'Juan Hart; Radric Davis; Xavier Dotson; Turner	Metro Boomin; Zaytoven; Bobby Kritical	3:44
4.	"Butterflies (Right Now)" (with Roscoe Dash and Quavo)	Wayne; Jeffery Johnson; Quavious Marshall	Metro Boomin	3:28
5.	"Take Me Thru Dere" (with Quavo, Breskii, and YK Niece)	Wayne; Marshall; Brianna Cody; Jada Smith; Turner	Metro Boomin; Bobby Kritical	2:42
6.	"Loose Screws" (with Skooly, Shad da God, and DJ Spinz)	Wayne; Kazarion Fowler; Rashad Battle; Gary Hill	Metro Boomin; DJ Spinz	3:37
7.	"Stealin All the Swag" (with Young Dro)	Wayne; Hart; Dotson	Metro Boomin; Zaytoven	3:01
8.	"WTF Goin" (with Young Dro)	Wayne; Hart; Dotson	Metro Boomin; Zaytoven	3:27
9.	"Issa Party" (with Young Dro, Meany, iMcfli, Shad da God, and DJ Spinz)	Wayne; Hart; Demetrius Hardin; Michael Gordon; Battle; G. Hill; Dotson; Turner	Metro Boomin; DJ Spinz; Zaytoven; Bobby Kritical	3:34
10.	"Clap" (with Waka Flocka Flame and DJ Spinz)	Wayne; Juaquin Malphurs; G. Hill; Turner; Christopher Townsend	Metro Boomin; DJ Spinz; Bobby Kritical; Chris XZ	2:42
11.	"Slide" (with Roscoe Dash)	Wayne; Johnson	Metro Boomin	3:55
12.	"My Lil Shit" (with J Money, BunnaB, Roscoe Dash, and Meany)	Wayne; Miller; Ereunna McCoy; Johnson; Hardin	Metro Boomin	3:15
13.	"Still Turnt (Forever B$hot)" (with Shad da God and Jose Guapo)	Wayne; Battle; Markell Cody; Pullen	Metro Boomin; The Real Mapa^{[a]}	4:13

A Futuristic Summa track listing – disc 2
No.	Title	Writer(s)	Producer(s)	Length
1.	"Drip BBQ" (with J Money, Quavo, and Waka Flocka Flame)	Wayne; Miller; Marshall; Malphurs; G. Hill	Metro Boomin	3:06
2.	"I Go" (with J Money)	Wayne	Metro Boomin	2:34
3.	"Make It Make Sense" (with Rocko)	Wayne; Rodney Hill; Dotson	Metro Boomin; Zaytoven	2:38
4.	"I Like That" (with Roscoe Dash, 2 Chainz, Waka Flocka Flame, and DJ Spinz)	Wayne; Johnson; Tauheed Epps; Malphurs; Carlton Mays; Dwayne Richardson; K. Smith	Honorable C.N.O.T.E.; Metro Boomin^{[a]}; DJ Spinz^{[a]}; D. Rich^{[a]}	4:00
5.	"Birthday" (with Young Thug, Skooly, and Yung Booke)	Wayne; Jeffery Williams; Fowler; Kedral Long; Turner; K. Smith	Metro Boomin; Bobby Kritical; DJ Plugg	3:21
6.	"Don't Stop Dancin" (with Meany, Skooly, and Lil Baby)	Wayne	Metro Boomin; DJ Spinz; B Rackz	3:05
7.	"U Deserve" (with T.I., Young Dro, Roscoe Dash, & Travis Porter)	Wayne; Clifford Harris; Hart; Johnson; Grant; Woods; Duncan; Dotson	Metro Boomin; Zaytoven	3:47
8.	"Overly Trimm" (with Young Dro, Quavo, Shad da God, Jose Guapo, Skooly, and DJ Spinz)	Wayne; Hart; Marshall; Battle; Cody; Fowler; G. Hill	Metro Boomin; DJ Spinz	3:47
9.	"Partying & Drinking" (with Waka Flocka Flame, Roscoe Dash, 21 Savage, and Future)	Wayne; Malphurs; Johnson; Shéyaa Bin Abraham-Joseph; Nayvadius Wilburn; Andre Proctor; Townsend	Metro Boomin; Dre Moon; Chris XZ	4:30
10.	"Jerry Curry (Love & Basketball)" (with Yung L.A. and Lil Baby)	Wayne	Metro Boomin	3:35
11.	"I Need (Where U From)" (bonus track; with Waka Flocka Flame, Yung L.A., J Money, Lil Baby, Roscoe Dash, 2 Chainz, and Skooly)	Wayne; Mays	Metro Boomin	3:18

=== Note ===
- ^{^[a]} signifies an additional producer

== Personnel ==
Credits adapted from Tidal.

=== Disc 1 ===
- Ethan Stevens – mixing
- Joe LaPorta – mastering
- Victor Luevanos – additional mixing
- Connor Rinoski – engineering (tracks 2, 11)
- Vickisha "S.O.G. Vick" Morency – engineering (2)
- William "Bilz" Dougan – engineering (2)
- Nicholas "Tyrks" Graham – engineering (3, 4, 12)
- Philippe Goudiaby – engineering (3, 6, 8, 9)
- Brianna Cody – background vocals (4, 5)
- Chris XZ – guitar (4, 11)
- Natalie Moran – background vocals (4)
- Samantha Hernandez – background vocals (4)
- Collins "Roos" Ukegbu – engineering (5, 9)
- Malik Benberry – engineering (7–10)
- Adejah Parish – background vocals (11)
- YK Niece – background vocals (11)

=== Disc 2 ===
- Ethan Stevens – mixing
- Joe LaPorta – mastering
- Victor Luevanos – additional mixing
- Nicholas "Tyrks" Graham – engineering (1–5, 8–10)
- Philippe Goudiaby – engineering (1, 3–6, 8, 9, 11)
- Connor Rinoski – engineering (2)
- Collins "Roos" Ukegbu – engineering (3, 6, 9)
- Chaquida Nicole Roosevelt – background vocals (4, 11)
- Courtney Lewis – background vocals (4, 11)
- Jasmine Smith – background vocals (4, 11)
- Vickisha "S.O.G. Vick" Morency – engineering (5)
- Peter Lee Johnson – bass (7)
- Chris XZ – guitar (7, 8)
- Malik Benberry – engineering (7, 8)
- Nolan Presley – engineering (9)

== Charts ==
Chart performance for A Futuristic Summa
Chart (2025)	Peak position
Belgian Albums (Ultratop Wallonia)	200
Canadian Albums (Billboard)	92
Portuguese Albums (AFP)	180
Swiss Albums (Schweizer Hitparade)	57
US Billboard 200	23
US Top R&B/Hip-Hop Albums (Billboard)	10
