= WTF Goin =

2026 single by Belly Gang Kushington and 21 Savage

Single by Belly Gang Kushington and 21 Savage
- Released: June 19, 2026
- Genre: Hip-hop
- Length: 3:04
- Label: Love Renaissance
- Songwriters: Carlos Walker; Mario Talley; PopLord; Shéyaa Bin Abraham-Joseph; Teriyakie Smith; Victor Thomas
- Producers: Belly Gang Kushington; Musik MajorX; Kutta Beatz; B100; Squat Beats

Belly Gang Kushington singles chronology
"High in ATL" (2026)	"WTF Goin" (2026)	"No Jewelry" (2026)

21 Savage singles chronology
"ASAP (Remix)" (2026)	"WTF Goin" (2026)

Music video
- "WTF Goin" on YouTube

"WTF Goin" is a song by American singer-rapper Belly Gang Kushington and British rapper 21 Savage. It was released on June 19, 2026 through Love Renaissance. The song is Belly Gang Kushington's first entry on the Billboard Hot 100, where it debuted at number 85.

== Critical reception ==
Writing for HotNewHipHop, Alexander Cole praised the song's horn-driven production for complementing Belly Gang Kushington's energetic delivery, while highlighting 21 Savage's guest performances as one of his better features in "quite some time".

== TikTok virality ==
In July and August 2026, the song received significant attention on the short-form video platform TikTok, where it was used in a viral trend involving twerking.

== Charts ==
Weekly chart performance for "WTF Goin"
Chart (2026)	Peak position
New Zealand Hot Singles (RMNZ)	39
US Billboard Hot 100	43
US Hot R&B/Hip-Hop Songs (Billboard)	6
US Rhythmic Airplay (Billboard)	1
