= Lorenzo Mauldin IV =

American gridiron football player (born 1992)

- Mauldin IV with the BC Lions in 2026

No. 93 – BC Lions
- Position: Defensive end
- Roster status: Active
- CFL status: American

Personal information
- Born: October 1, 1992 (age 34); Sacramento, California, U.S.
- Listed height: 6 ft 5 in (1.96 m)
- Listed weight: 265 lb (120 kg)

Career information
- High school: Maynard H. Jackson (Atlanta, Georgia)
- College: Louisville (2011–2013)
- NFL draft: 2015: 3rd round, 82nd overall pick

Career history
- New York Jets (2015–2017); Hamilton Tiger-Cats (2019–2021); Ottawa Redblacks (2022–2025); Calgary Stampeders (2025); Louisville Kings (2026)*; BC Lions (2026–present)
- * Offseason or practice squad member only

Awards and highlights
- CFL's Most Outstanding Defensive Player Award (2022); James P. McCaffrey Trophy (2022); 2× CFL All-Star (2022, 2024); 2× CFL East All-Star (2022, 2024); Second-team All-ACC (2014)

Career NFL statistics
- Total tackles: 33
- Sacks: 6.5
- Fumble recoveries: 1
- Interceptions: 1
- Stats at Pro Football Reference

Career CFL statistics as of 2026
- Total tackles: 186
- Sacks: 38
- Forced fumbles: 6
- Stats at CFL.ca

Lorenzo Malik Mauldin IV (born October 1, 1992) is an American professional football defensive end for the BC Lions of the Canadian Football League (CFL). He was selected by the New York Jets in the third round of the 2015 NFL draft. He played college football at Louisville.

== Early life ==
Lorenzo Malik Mauldin IV was born in Sacramento, California on October 1, 1992. He spent most of his childhood with 16 different foster parents as both of his parents were in jail. Mauldin IV attended Maynard H. Jackson High School in Atlanta, Georgia, where he played football and basketball and competed in track. In high school football, Mauldin IV was named to Class AA All-State Team. In track & field, Mauldin IV competed in events ranging from the high jump to the discus throw. At the 2010 Whitefield Meet, he took fourth in the discus throw (114 ft 4 in) and second in the shot put (44 ft 7 in).

Regarded as a three-star prospect by Rivals.com, Mauldin IV was rated as the 82nd-best player in Georgia. He was rated as the 67th-best defensive end by ESPN.com, and the 133rd-best defensive end by Scout.com. He chose Louisville over Kentucky, Middle Tennessee, South Alabama, Troy and South Carolina, where he originally committed.

== College career ==
As a true freshman at the University of Louisville in 2011, Mauldin IV played in all 12 of the Cardinals games and recorded six tackles. As a sophomore in 2012, Mauldin IV started six of 11 games, recording 22 tackles and a team-leading 4.5 sacks. In August 2013, prior to his junior season, Mauldin IV was involved in a hit and run moped accident. He recovered and started all 13 games that season. He finished the year with 40 tackles and 9.5 sacks. Prior to his senior season in 2014, Mauldin IV was moved from defensive end to linebacker.

== Professional career ==
=== New York Jets ===
Mauldin IV was selected by the New York Jets in the third round (82nd overall) of the 2015 NFL draft. He signed a four-year, $3 million contract on May 7, 2015.

Mauldin IV played his first regular season game on September 13, 2015, against the Cleveland Browns, where he forced a fumble off Johnny Manziel. However, after forcing the fumble, he suffered an apparent neck injury, was rendered unconscious for a few minutes, carted off the field, and taken to a local hospital. After undergoing tests, he was diagnosed with a concussion and no serious neck injury. During his rookie season in 2015, Mauldin IV played 15 games making 10 tackles, 4 sacks, and a fumble recovery.

On September 4, 2017, Mauldin IV was placed on injured reserve after dealing with a back injury throughout training camp. On September 1, 2018, Mauldin IV was released by the Jets.

=== Hamilton Tiger-Cats ===
Mauldin IV signed with the Hamilton Tiger-Cats of the Canadian Football League (CFL) on April 15, 2019. He played in 11 regular season games where he recorded seven defensive tackles, seven special teams tackles, and three sacks. He did not play in 2020 due to the cancellation of the 2020 CFL season, and opted to sign a one-year contract extension on January 4, 2021. He played in six games where he had six defensive tackles, five special teams tackles, one sack, and one forced fumble.

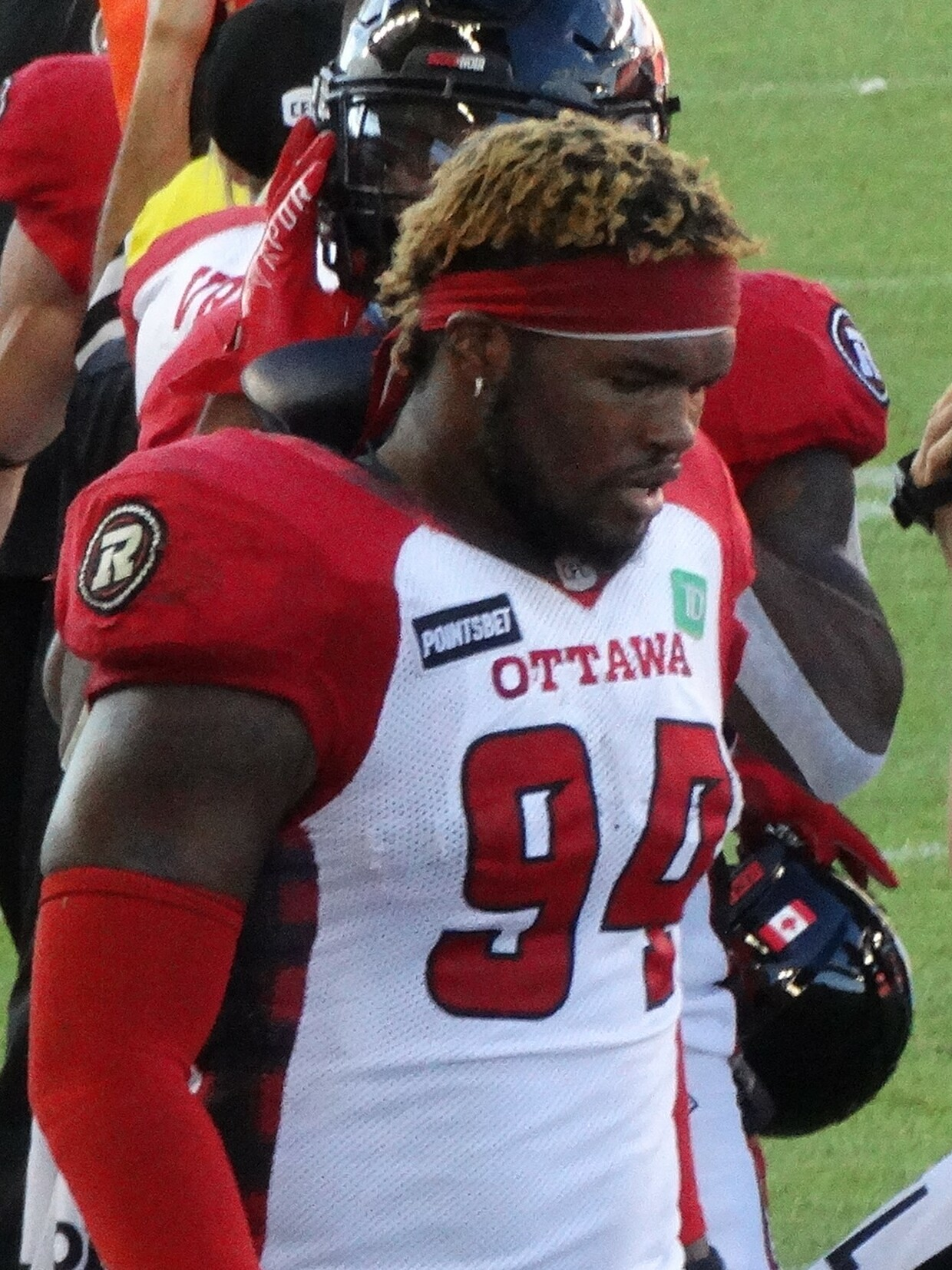
Mauldin IV with the Ottawa Redblacks in 2022

=== Ottawa Redblacks ===
On February 8, 2022, it was announced that Mauldin IV had signed with the Ottawa Redblacks of the CFL. 2022 was a breakout year for Mauldin IV . He led the league with 17 sacks and won the CFL's Most Outstanding Defensive Player Award. As a pending free agent, Mauldin IV and the Redblacks agreed to a one-year contract extension on January 18, 2023. On January 10, 2025, Mauldin IV and the Redblacks agreed to a one-year contract extension.

=== Calgary Stampeders ===
On September 28, 2025, Mauldin IV was traded to the Calgary Stampeders, in exchange for a fourth-round selection in the 2026 CFL draft.

=== Louisville Kings ===
On February 11, 2026, Mauldin IV signed with the Louisville Kings of the United Football League (UFL). On March 4, 2026, Mauldin IV announced his retirement from professional football, in lieu of joining his new team. On March 19, 2026, Mauldin IV signed a one-day contract to retire with the Redblacks.

=== BC Lions ===
On July 27, 2026, Mauldin IV came out of retirement to sign with the BC Lions. On September 11, 2026, Mauldin IV was placed on the Lions' reserve roster after suffering a leg injury the previous week. He rejoined the active roster on September 24, 2026.

== Personal life ==
On June 11, 2017, it was revealed that Mauldin IV attacked another customer at a Manhattan nightclub two months prior to the announcement. The battle started when the customer spilled champagne on Mauldin IV, triggering his attack. The victim was punched twice, left with a black eye, and hospitalized. On June 21, 2017, Mauldin IV turned himself in to police, and was charged with misdemeanor assault.
