= Greg Favors =

American football player (born 1974)

No. 54, 51, 53, 55
- Position: Linebacker

Personal information
- Born: September 30, 1974 (age 52); Atlanta, Georgia, U.S.
- Listed height: 6 ft 1 in (1.85 m)
- Listed weight: 242 lb (110 kg)

Career information
- High school: Southside (Atlanta)
- College: Mississippi State
- NFL draft: 1998: 4th round, 120th overall pick

Career history
- Kansas City Chiefs (1998); Tennessee Titans (1999–2001); Indianapolis Colts (2002); Buffalo Bills (2002); Carolina Panthers (2003); Jacksonville Jaguars (2004–2005)

Awards and highlights
- First-team All-SEC (1997)

Career NFL statistics
- Tackles: 242
- Sacks: 14.5
- Interceptions: 1
- Stats at Pro Football Reference

Gregory Bernard Favors (born September 30, 1974) is an American former professional football player who was a linebacker in the National Football League (NFL). He was selected by the Kansas City Chiefs in the fourth round of the 1998 NFL draft. He played high school football at Southside High School in Atlanta and college football for the Mississippi State Bulldogs.

Favors also played for the Tennessee Titans, Indianapolis Colts, Buffalo Bills, Carolina Panthers, and Jacksonville Jaguars. In 1999, the Titans made it to Super Bowl XXXIV in which Favors appeared as a substitute, however they lost to the Kurt Warner-led St. Louis Rams.

== NFL career statistics ==
Legend
**Bold**	Career high

=== Regular season ===
Year	Team	Games		Tackles				Interceptions				Fumbles			
Year	Team	GP	GS	Comb	Solo	Ast	Sck	Int	Yds	TD	Lng	FF	FR	Yds	TD
1998	KAN	16	4	19	17	2	2.0	0	0	0	0	**1**	**1**	**41**	0
1999	TEN	15	0	11	9	2	0.0	0	0	0	0	0	**1**	0	0
2000	TEN	16	15	39	30	9	**5.5**	0	0	0	0	**1**	0	0	0
2001	TEN	16	12	50	32	18	1.5	**1**	0	0	0	0	0	0	0
2002	BUF	6	0	5	2	3	0.0	0	0	0	0	0	0	0	0
2003	CAR	16	12	**76**	**56**	**20**	0.0	0	0	0	0	**1**	0	0	0
2004	JAX	15	11	36	25	11	**5.5**	0	0	0	0	0	0	0	0
2005	JAX	1	0	6	1	5	0.0	0	0	0	0	0	0	0	0
		101	54	242	172	70	14.5	1	0	0	0	3	2	41	0

=== Playoffs ===
Year	Team	Games		Tackles				Interceptions				Fumbles			
Year	Team	GP	GS	Comb	Solo	Ast	Sck	Int	Yds	TD	Lng	FF	FR	Yds	TD
1999	TEN	4	0	3	3	0	0.0	0	0	0	0	0	0	0	0
2000	TEN	1	1	1	1	0	0.0	0	0	0	0	0	0	0	0
2003	CAR	4	3	**12**	**10**	**2**	**1.0**	0	0	0	0	0	0	0	0
2005	JAX	1	0	0	0	0	0.0	0	0	0	0	0	0	0	0
		10	4	16	14	2	1.0	0	0	0	0	0	0	0	0
