= Be More Grateful =

Studio album by DaBaby
- Released: January 30, 2026
- Recorded: 2025–2026
- Genre: Hip-hop
- Length: 58:10
- Labels: SCMG; Interscope
- Producers: Charlie Heat; DJ K.i.D; Eric Hudson; 22Cartel; ANT The Official; BandPlay; BB; Benjamin Lasnier; Blazefxme; Byeperfect; CC; consiuosite; Cookitupdavid; Drvmlord; DxrkMatter; Dylan Hyde; FRAXILLE; Jaxmadethis; Jerm Juice; KayoTheWizard; Krazy Figz; LC; Leslie Johnson; Matt Nadler; MikeFrom31st; OB MUS1C; Pivi; Rewind; Rick Brown; Sean Da Firzt; Sondre Haftorsen; TheOwnlyHope; Tomas Gutierrez; Tyler coolidge; Zach Geitner

DaBaby chronology
Please Say DaBaby, Vol. 1 (2025)	Be More Grateful (2026)

Singles from Be More Grateful
- 1. "PBJT" Released: December 1, 2025; 2. "Letter to My YN" Released: December 12, 2025; 3. "Out Ya Business" Released: December 22, 2025; 4. "Don't Insult Me" Released: January 5, 2026; 5. "Pop Dat Thang" Released: January 23, 2026

Be More Grateful is the fifth studio album by American rapper DaBaby. It was released on January 30, 2026, by Interscope Records and SCMG. The album features guest appearances by Coi Leray, Hunxho and DaBaby's daughter Twin. Production was handled by various producers including longtime collaborator DJ K.i.D, Charlie Heat, and Eric Hudson, among others.

== Background ==
On December 1, 2025, DaBaby released the album's lead single, "PBJT".

On December 12, 2025, he released the second single of the album, "Letter to My YN".

On December 22, 2025, he released the third single of the album, "Out Ya Business", which was released for his 34th birthday.

On January 5, 2026, he announced the album and released the fourth single, "Don't Insult Me", which features his daughter, Twin.

== Critical reception ==
Professional ratings
Review scores
Source	Rating
AllMusic	2.5/5 stars
Ratings Games Music	70%

AllMusic gave the album a mixed review saying "Be More Grateful shows glimpses of growth, but ultimately that growth stalls out shortly after it begins." Quincy Dominic from Ratings Games Music gave the album a positive review, calling the song "Paper Low" to be the best on the album.

== Commercial performance ==
Be More Grateful debuted at number 25 on the US Billboard 200 and number 9 on the Top R&B/Hip-Hop Albums charts selling 24,000 album-equivalent units in its first week.

== Track listing ==
Be More Grateful Track listing
No.	Title	Writer(s)	Producer(s)	Length
1.	"Sticks and Stones" (Intro)	Jonathan Kirk; Jeremy Dupree; Adam Gamble; Anthony Mosley	Sean Da Firzt; KayoTheWizard; Jerm Juice	3:48
2.	"Pop Dat Thang"	Kirk; Gamble; Mosley	Sean Da Firzt; KayoTheWizard	2:18
3.	"What About Me"	Kirk; De'Juane Dunwood; Emiliano Marcuzzi; Christos Panos; Petros Charalampidis; Sascha Brubacher	DJ K.i.D; DxrkMatter; Pivi; CC; BB	2:07
4.	"Pootie Tang"	Kirk; Dunwood; Marcuzzi; Panos; Brubacher	DJ K.i.D; Byeperfect; Blazerfxme	2:03
5.	"Don Julio Lemonade"	Kirk; Dunwood; Mikel Jones; Rick Brown; Billy Moss; Eric Bishop	DJ K.i.D; MikeFrom31st; Brown	2:00
6.	"Marinating"	Kirk; Mosley; Gamble	Sean Da Firzt; KayoTheWizard	3:36
7.	"Paper Low"	Kirk; Mosley; Gamble	Sean Da Firzt; KayoTheWizard	2:42
8.	"Out Ya Business"	Kirk; Dunwood; Luke Clay; Vadim Rogozhin	DJ K.i.D; Byeperfect; 22Cartel; LC	2:10
9.	"Make You Mine" (featuring Hunxho)	Kirk; Ibrahim Dodo; Gamble; Mosley; Matt Nadler; Tomas Gutierrez	Sean Da Firzt; KayoTheWizard; Nadler; Gutierrez	2:44
10.	"Shake the Spot"	Kirk; Gamble; Mosley	Sean Da Firzt; KayoTheWizard	1:52
11.	"#1 Nigga"	Kirk; Dunwood; Benjamin Lasnier; Sondre Haftorsen	DJ K.i.D; Lasnier; Haftorsen	2:09
12.	"Clear This Shit"	Kirk; Dunwood; Zach Geitner; Kanye West; Eric Hudson	DJ K.i.D; Geitner	2:20
13.	"Rain Rain"	Kirk; Dunwood	DJ K.i.D; Ant the Official; Cookitupdavid; OB Mus1c; Consiuosite	2:19
14.	"Beneficial"	Kirk; Gamble; Mosley	Sean Da Firzt; KayoTheWizard	3:24
15.	"Baby Daddy Music"	Kirk; Tim Walls; Jonas Gumdal	Krazy Figz; Fraxille	2:23
16.	"Crank [Sumn]"	Kirk; Gamble; Mosley	Sean Da Firzt; KayoTheWizard	2:09
17.	"Letter to My YN"	Kirk; Krishon Gaines; Chad Butler; Percy Miller; Raymond Poole	BandPlay; Drvmlord	3:11
18.	"Don't Insult Me" (featuring Twin)	Kirk; Gamble; Mosley	Sean Da Firzt; KayoTheWizard	2:43
19.	"PBJT"	Kirk; Dunwood; Geitner	DJ K.i.D; Jaxmadethis; Geitner	2:00
20.	"Boomerang" (with Coi Leray)	Kirk; Coi Leray; Tyler Coolidge; Dylan Hyde; Harry Wayne Casey	DJ K.i.D; Ant the Official; Coolidge; Hyde	2:23
21.	"Boom"	Kirk; Dunwood	DJ K.i.D; Charlie Heat	1:47
22.	"Mic Check"	Kirk; Gamble; Mosley; Hyde; Leslie Johnson	Sean Da Firzt; KayoTheWizard; Hyde; L. Johnson	2:58
23.	"Kobe in 2009" (Outro)	Kirk; Dunwood; Michael Johnson	DJ K.i.D; Rewind; TheOwnlyHope	3:04
Total length:				58:10

== Charts ==
Chart performance for Be More Grateful
Chart (2026)	Peak position
US Billboard 200	25
US Top R&B/Hip-Hop Albums (Billboard)	9
