= Belly Gang Kushington =

American rapper

- Thomas in 2025

Background information
- Born: Victor Thomas; 1990 or 1991 (age 35–36); Atlanta, Georgia, U.S.
- Genres: Southern hip-hop; trap
- Occupations: Rapper; songwriter
- Instrument: Vocals
- Years active: 2016–present
- Label: Love Renaissance
- Children: 1
- Website: www.bellygangkushington.com

Victor Thomas (born 1990 or 1991), known professionally as Belly Gang Kushington, an American rapper. Hailing from Atlanta, Georgia, he began his recording career in 2016 and signed with Love Renaissance in 2024.

After releasing his debut studio album The Streets Is Yours (2025), he had his mainstream breakout with his single "Friend Do (Remix)" (featuring YKNiece). His 2026 song "WTF Goin" (with 21 Savage) peaked at number 43 on Billboard Hot 100 — his first entry on the chart.

== Early life ==
Victor Thomas was born in Atlanta, Georgia, and was raised in the Adamsville neighborhood. His mother left after his birth, leaving him to be raised by his dad.

== Career ==
Thomas signed with record label Love Renaissance in late 2024. He released his debut studio album, The Streets is Yours, on April 25, 2025, through the label.

In March 2026, Thomas was named Billboard's Hip-Hop Rookie of the Month. In May, he was nominated for the BET Award for Best New Artist. In June, Thomas was named to the Freshman XXL list of 2026.

== Artistry ==
He has cited Nettspend, YKNiece, Jeezy, T.I., Rocco, and Young Dro as influences on his music.

== Personal life ==
Thomas has one son.

== Discography ==
=== Studio albums ===
List of studio albums
| Title | Studio album details |
|---|---|
| The Streets Is Yours | Released: April 25, 2025; Label: LVRN; Format: Digital download, streaming |
| Good Dope Sell Itself | Released: November 13, 2026; Label: LVRN; Format: LP, digital download, streaming |

=== Singles ===
List of singles, with selected peak chart positions
| Title | Year | Peak chart positions | | | | Album |
| Title | Year | US | US R&B/HH | US Rap | NZ Hot | Album |
|---|---|---|---|---|---|---|
| "Do You?" | 2023 | — | — | — | — | Non-album singles |
| "5pm in Atlanta" | 2023 | — | — | — | — | Non-album singles |
| "Same Day" | 2023 | — | — | — | — | Non-album singles |
| "Aye Tay" | 2024 | — | — | — | — | Non-album singles |
| "Ice Cup" | 2025 | — | — | — | — | The Streets Is Yours |
| "Four One" | 2025 | — | — | — | — | The Streets Is Yours |
| "Dont Do It" | 2025 | — | — | — | — | The Streets Is Yours |
| "Friend Do" (solo or remix with YKNiece) | 2025 | — (Note: "Friend Do" did not enter the Billboard Hot 100, but peaked at number 6 on the Bubbling Under Hot 100 chart.) | 27 | 20 | — | The Streets Is Yours |
| "Break Up Interlude" (with YTB Fatt) | 2025 | — | — | — | — | The Streets Is Yours |
| "Hustlin MF Pt 2" (with Bally Baby) | 2026 | — | — | — | — | Baby Drank (Refill) |
| "Tell Me Now" (with Dess Dior) | 2026 | — | — | — | — | Take Notes and Note to Self |
| "WTF Goin" (with 21 Savage) | 2026 | 43 | 6 | 3 | 39 | Good Dope Sell Itself |
| "No Jewelry" | 2026 | — | — | — | — | Good Dope Sell Itself |
| "Lite" (with BigXthaPlug) | 2026 | — (Note: "Lite" did not enter the Billboard Hot 100, but peaked at number 7 on the Bubbling Under Hot 100 chart.) | 27 | — | — | Better Over Time |

=== Guest appearances ===
| Title | Year | Other artist(s) | Album |
|---|---|---|---|
| "Countin Blues" | 2024 | OMB Peezy, Will a Fool | Still Too Deep |
| "Lord Prepare Me" | 2024 | Michael & The Mighty Midnight Revival, Jane Handcock, Adonica Nunn | Songs for Sinners & Saints |
| "More Than Me" | 2025 | Jermaine Dupri, Swavay | Magic City |
