= Vayda (rapper) =

American rapper

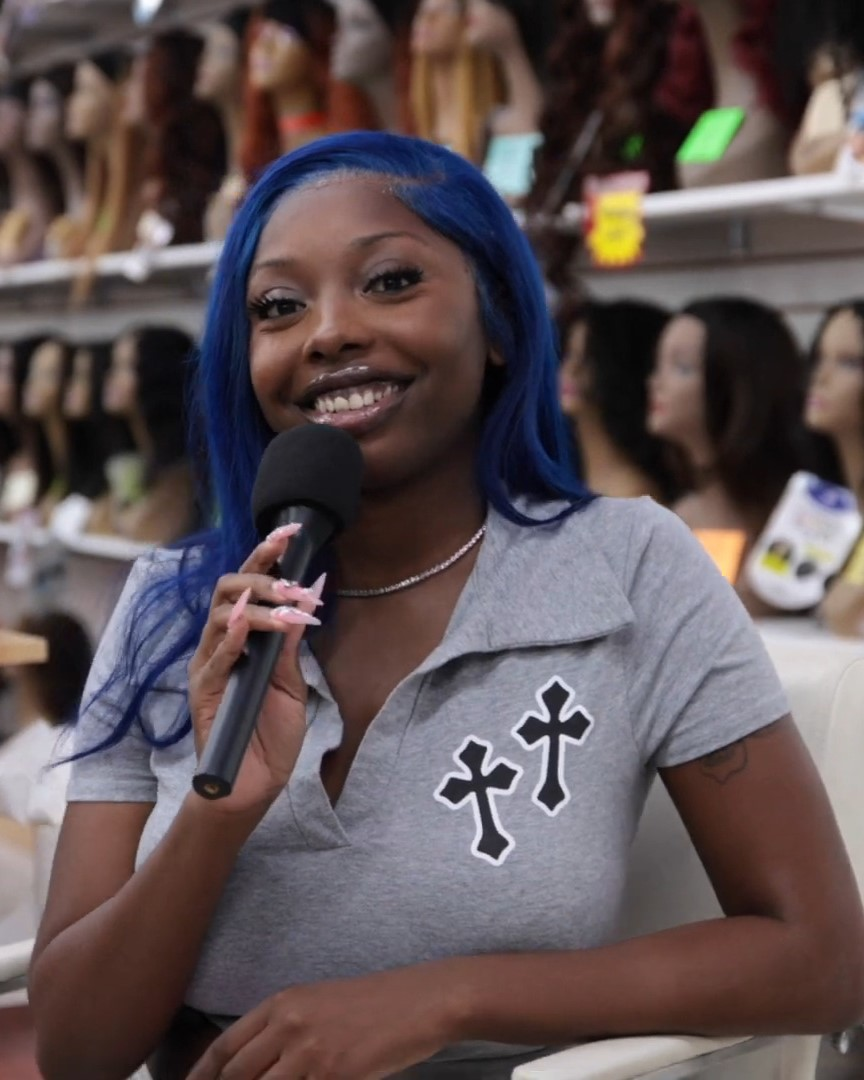
- Vayda in 2024

Background information
- Born: Decatur, Georgia, U.S.
- Origin: Atlanta, Georgia, U.S.
- Genres: Trap; plugg; dance
- Occupations: Rapper; record producer
- Instruments: Vocals; piano
- Years active: 2019–present

Vayda is an American rapper and record producer. After starting her rap career in 2021, she released the mixtapes Breeze and Forrest Gump in 2023.

== Career ==
Vayda was born and raised in Decatur, Georgia. Her father is a former rapper who was part of a hip hop group. As a child, she learned to play piano by ear. After receiving a subscription to the production software FruityLoops in high school, she was inspired by mashups on Soulection to become a record producer. She produced remixes that she posted on SoundCloud as well as beats that she sold on Twitter.

Vayda started producing music professionally in 2019 and started rapping in 2021, following the COVID-19 pandemic. She released her extended play, VV, in 2022. In 2023, she released the mixtape Breeze, her EP Shade, and performed as an opening act for Veeze. Pitchfork named Breeze as one of the best rap albums of 2023 and Vayda's song "Jenner" as one of the best rap songs of 2023. Her mixtape, Forrest Gump, was released on December 8, 2023, with her song "Hood Zendaya" released as its lead single in November 2023.

== Musical style ==
Vayda's songs have been described as trap music, particularly plugg and drill, and dance music. Her songs are often sped-up and around two minutes in length. She has stated that she "barely [has] any songs that reach two minutes". For BET, Paul Meara wrote that her lyrics were "whisper-quiet" and "snarky" and compared her sound to "FKA Twigs mixed with early 2010's and modern-day Jersey club". For Pitchfork, Alphonse Pierre wrote that her songs were "lush hybrids of ASMR R&B and airy rap" that were typically "not much longer than a minute". DeAsia Paige, for The Atlanta Journal-Constitution, described her voice as "soft and squeaky" and her beats as "sped-up". Jordan Darville of The Fader wrote that Vayda sounded "effortlessly cool" in her music. Tirhakah Love of The Cut wrote that her songs were sample-heavy and "two-to-three-minute short stories, where she mows over snakes attempting to test her backbone".

== Discography ==
=== Mixtapes ===
List of mixtapes, with selected details
Title	Details
Silent Garden	Released: September 7, 2021; Label: Self-released; Formats: Digital download, streaming
2 Hard 2 Waste	Released: January 15, 2022; Label: Self-released; Formats: Digital download, streaming
Breeze	Released: March 13, 2023; Label: Self-released; Formats: Digital download, streaming
Dawn	Released: May 26, 2023; Label: Self-released; Formats: Digital download, streaming
Forrest Gump	Released: December 8, 2023; Label: Self-released; Formats: Digital download, streaming

=== Extended plays ===
List of extended plays, with selected details
Title	Details
Pretty Beats for Pretty Bitches	Released: July 10, 2020; Label: Self-released; Formats: Digital download, streaming
VV	Released: February 8, 2022; Label: Self-released; Formats: Digital download, streaming
Goodnight Kitty	Released: May 25, 2022; Label: Self-released; Formats: Digital download, streaming
Airhead	Released: August 19, 2022; Label: Self-released; Formats: Digital download, streaming
5	Released: September 19, 2022; Label: Self-released; Formats: Digital download, streaming
Digitalgirl	Released: October 26, 2022; Label: Self-released; Formats: Digital download, streaming
Shade	Released: January 1, 2023; Label: Self-released; Formats: Digital download, streaming
Fever (with Attnwhore)	Released: March 13, 2023; Label: Self-released; Formats: Digital download, streaming
Kali Ma (with Space)	Released: October 20, 2023; Label: Self-released; Formats: Digital download, streaming

=== Singles ===
==== As lead artist ====
List of singles as lead artist, showing year released and album name
Title	Year	Album
"Mental Exhaustion"	2021	Non-album singles
"U Can Get Money Too"	2021	Non-album singles
"Videogirl"	2022	Non-album singles
"Sumo" (featuring Nedarb)	2022	Non-album singles
"Sprite" (featuring Noah Salem)	2023	Forrest Gump
"Tweaker"	2023	Forrest Gump
"Shoes"	2023	Non-album single
"Adele"	2023	Forrest Gump
"Heart Eyez" (with Attnwhore)	2023	Fever
"Hood Zendaya"	2023	Forrest Gump
"Hilary Duff" (with Attnwhore)	2024	Fever
"Witness" (with 40streak)	2024	Non-album single

==== As featured artist ====
List of singles as featured artist, showing year released and album name
Title	Year	Album
"Astronomy" (Upset Ocho featuring Vayda)	2023	Non-album singles
"Dreamin'" (NoGum Hundo featuring Vayda and 4pooch)	2023	Non-album singles
"Parlay" (Shoey featuring Vayda and Dylvinci)	2023	Non-album singles
"Pull Up" (Faro and Eagle Syndrome featuring Vayda)	2024	Non-album singles

=== Guest appearances ===
List of non-single guest appearances, showing year released and album name
Title	Other artist(s)	Year	Album
"Lookin..'! (Gorgeous)"	Pink Siifu, Turich Benjy, WiFiGawd	2023	It's Too Quiet..'!
