= 310babii =

American rapper (born 2005)

- 310babii in 2025

Background information
- Born: Kameron Joshua Milner; December 30, 2005 (age 20); Inglewood, California, U.S.
- Genre: West Coast hip hop
- Occupations: Rapper; songwriter
- Years active: 2022–present
- Labels: Empire; High IQ
- Website: 310babii.com

Kameron Joshua Milner (born December 30, 2005), known professionally as 310babii (pronounced "three-one-oh baby"), is an American rapper. He rose to fame in 2023 with the release of his single "Soak City", which peaked at number 53 on the Billboard Hot 100 and received platinum certification by the Recording Industry Association of America (RIAA). The song preceded his debut extended play, Lottery Pick (2023).

== Life and career ==
=== Early life ===
Kameron Joshua Milner was born on December 30, 2005, in Inglewood, California. He discovered his passion for rap at a young age, drawing inspiration from West Coast hip hop and artists like Kendrick Lamar. He pursued music and began recording songs, including his hit single "Soak City (Do It)".

=== 2022–2023: Career beginnings and Lottery Pick ===
Milner began rapping in 2020, citing influence from Kendrick Lamar. By early 2023, Milner decided to pursue rap professionally and adopted the stage name 310babii. On June 23, 2023, Milner released the single "Soak City (Do it)", through Empire Distribution. The song was recorded using the BandLab app and produced by Donez and KreepTeam.

On June 15, 2023, Milner released his debut commercial extended play, Lottery Pick. According to reviews, while the album falls short lyrically, it excels as a California party album, offering a seamless and enjoyable musical backdrop from start to finish, perfect for a lively gathering.

In September 2023, "Soak City (Do It)" became integral to National Football League (NFL) end zone celebrations, with players Travis Kelce and Rashid Shaheed incorporating the song's accompanying "squabble dance" into their routines. It also garnered attention and endorsement from rapper Travis Scott. The song gained significant traction among celebrities, including Nick Cannon and Kai Cenat. On TikTok, the song inspired over 304,000 creations and reached No. 24 on the TikTok Billboard Top 50. It debuted at No. 61 on the Billboard Hot 100. On September 8, 2023, Milner released the remix of "Soak City (Do It)", featuring Blueface, Tyga, Mustard, OhGeesy, and BlueBucksClan.

On October 27, 2023, 310babii released the single "Walk" featuring fellow rappers Luh Tyler and Cash Kidd, alongside a music video. On November 17, 2023, 310babii was featured on John Mackk's remix single "Slow It Down".

=== 2024–present: Nights and Weekends and 310degrees ===
On January 12, 2024, 310babii released "Stuck" featuring Kalan.FrFr. Milner released his debut studio album titled Nights and Weekends on February 23, 2024, with guest appearances from Duke Deuce, BIA, DDG, D. Savage, Luh Tyler, and 03 Greedo. On June 19, 2024, 310babii performed "Soak City (Do It)" at The Pop Out: Ken & Friends. 310babii released his single "Rock Your Hips" on August 16, 2024, featuring Saweetie and produced by GodDamnitDupri. 310babii released "that's it" on September 20, 2024.

On October 4, 2024, Milner released his second studio album 310degrees featuring Luh Tyler, Saweetie, Roy Woods, Money Man, and Lakeyah. In an exclusive interview, Milner discussed the inspiration behind his album title "310degrees". He stated: "The title represents my growth as an artist. My first project, nights and weekends, reflected my limitations while in school, only working at night and on weekends. In contrast, 310degrees showcases my ability to dedicate myself fully to music, with no restrictions." He further explained: "Now, I'm able to work every day of the week, unhindered. I'm completely focused on my craft, unlike before when I had to condense interviews and work into weekends."

On October 15, 2024, Milner performed his hit single "Soak City" at the 2024 BET Hip Hop Awards, held in Las Vegas, Nevada. He was featured on JayDon's single "Ah! Ah!" on November 8, 2024.

== Discography ==
=== Studio albums ===
Title	Details
Nights and Weekends	Release date: February 23, 2024; Label: High IQ/Empire; Format: Digital download, streaming
310degrees	Release date: October 4, 2024; Label: High IQ/Empire; Format: Digital download, streaming

=== Extended plays ===
Title	Details
Lottery Pick	Release date: June 15, 2023; Label: High IQ/Empire; Format: Digital download, streaming

=== Charted singles ===
List of charted singles, showing year released, peak positions, certifications, and album name
Title	Year	Peak chart positions			Certifications	Album
Title	Year	US	US R&B	US Rhy.	Certifications	Album
"Soak City (Do It)"	2023	53	17	1	RIAA: Platinum	Lottery Pick
"Rock Your Hips" (with OhGeesy and BlueBucksClan)	2024	—	—	2		310degrees
"Bad" (with James Brown)	2025	—	—	22		Non-album singles
