= Whim Whamiee =

2025 single by Pluto and YK Niece

Single by Pluto and YKNiece

from the album Both Ways
- Released: February 3, 2025
- Genre: Hip hop
- Length: 2:21
- Label: Motown
- Songwriters: Jada Smith; Shanice Cameron
- Producers: Zaytoven; Mikey; Jai

Pluto singles chronology
"Upende Ongaqondeki" (2025)	"Whim Whamiee" (2025)	"Vocea Ta" (2025)

YK Niece singles chronology
"Whim Whamiee" (2025)	"Bag Talk" (2025)

Remix cover
- Cover art of the official remix featuring Sexyy Red.

Music video
- "Whim Whamiee" on YouTube

"Whim Whamiee" is a song by American rappers Pluto and YKNiece, released on February 3, 2025. It was produced by Zaytoven, Mikey and Jai.

== Content ==
In the song, Pluto's lyrics center on men and relationships, with sexually explicit lyrics ("He want me bad, heard he a duck, can't get no coochie out the queen, put some Lulu on this butt"). On the chorus, she raps "We forever gettin' money, you forever gon' be mad" and also references rapper BunnaB and her single "No Drought". The song is also titled after "Whim Wham" by rapper Mook B of D4L.

== Critical reception ==
Vivian Medithi of The Fader commented "It might be too early to start pinning down a song of the summer but allow me to make a humble nomination. On 'Whim Whamiee,' Pluto and YK Niece take a typically sproingy Zaytoven instrumental for a totally jacked-up joyride. Consider it 'F.N.F.' for 2025". Medithi further wrote, "Still, things aren't quite all-gas-no-brakes for the Atlanta cosmetologist-turned-anthem writer. Her flow careens around the pocket on her bite-size verse before skidding to a stop on a dime in the middle of the chorus. Her verse traverses her vocal range, from pinched upper register to ellipsis-loaded midrange. She's not saying much, just the usual fly shit, but she's saying it perfectly. Point in case: the song's addictive adlibs, both the titular whim whammieeeee and the sponsorship-ready Lululemonnnnn, which seem liable to emanate from smartphones around America for at least the next three months."

== Remix ==
In May 2025, rappers Sexyy Red, Latto, Lizzo and Queen Key each shared their own verses for a remix of "Whim Whamiee", as an informal competition on social media. An official remix of the song featuring Sexyy Redd was released on May 30, 2025.

== Charts ==
=== Weekly charts ===
Weekly chart performance for "Whim Whamiee"
Chart (2025)	Peak position
US Billboard Hot 100	51
US Hot R&B/Hip-Hop Songs (Billboard)	12
US Rhythmic (Billboard)	28

=== Year-end charts ===
Year-end chart performance for "Whim Whamiee"
Chart (2025)	Position
US Hot R&B/Hip-Hop Songs (Billboard)	34
