= Rhythmic Airplay =

US music chart published by Billboard magazine

The Rhythmic Airplay chart (previously named Rhythmic Songs, Rhythmic Top 40 and CHR/Rhythmic) is an airplay chart published weekly by Billboard magazine.

The chart tracks and measures the airplay of songs played on US rhythmic radio stations, whose playlist includes mostly hit-driven R&B/hip-hop, rhythmic pop, and some dance tracks. Nielsen Audio sometimes refers to the format as rhythmic contemporary hit radio. The current number-one song on the chart is "WTF Goin" by Belly Gang Kushington and 21 Savage.

== History ==
Billboard magazine first took notice of the newly emerged genre on February 27, 1987, when it launched the first crossover chart, Hot Crossover 30. It originally consisted of thirty titles and was based on reporting by eighteen stations, five of which were considered as pure rhythmic. The chart featured a mix of urban contemporary, top 40 and dance hits. In September 1989, Billboard split the Hot Crossover 30 chart in two: Top 40/Dance and Top 40/Rock, the latter of which focused on rock titles which crossed over. By December 1990, Billboard eliminated the chart because more top 40 and R&B stations were becoming identical with the rhythmic-heavy playlist being played at the crossover stations at the time.

Billboard revived the chart in October 1992 as Top 40/Rhythm-Crossover, with the first number one being "End of the Road" by Boyz II Men. On June 25, 1997, it was renamed to Rhythmic Top 40 as a way to distinguish stations that continued to play a broad based rhythmic mix from those whose mix leaned heavily toward R&B and hip-hop. It was changed to Rhythmic Airplay in the February 7, 2004, issue and shortened to Rhythmic on July 12, 2008.

== Chart criteria ==
There are forty positions on this chart and it is solely based on radio airplay. 66 rhythmic radio stations are electronically monitored 24 hours a day, seven days a week by Nielsen Broadcast Data Systems. Songs are ranked based on the number of plays that each song received during that week.

Songs receiving the greatest growth will receive a "bullet", although there are tracks that will also get bullets if the loss in detections doesn't exceed the percentage of downtime from a monitored station. "Airpower" awards are issued to songs that appear on the top 20 of both the airplay and audience chart for the first time, while the "greatest gainer" award is given to song with the largest increase in detections. A song with six or more spins in its first week is awarded an "airplay add". If a song is tied for the most spins in the same week, the one with the biggest increase that previous week will rank higher, but if both songs show the same amount of spins regardless of detection the song that is being played at more stations is ranked higher. Songs that fall below the top 15 and have been on the chart after 20 weeks are removed.

== Song records ==
=== Most weeks at number one ===
| Number of weeks | Song | Artist | Year(s) | Source |
|---|---|---|---|---|
| 15 | "No Scrubs" | TLC | 1999 | |
| 14 | "Twisted" | Keith Sweat | 1996 | |
| 13 | "Freak Me" | Silk | 1993 | |
| 13 | "You Make Me Wanna..." | Usher | 1997–98 | |
| 12 | "I'll Make Love to You" | Boyz II Men | 1994 | |
| 12 | "Lollipop" | Lil Wayne featuring Static Major | 2008 | |
| 12 | "Not Like Us" | Kendrick Lamar | 2024 | |
| 11 | "Shoop" | Salt-n-Pepa | 1993–94 | |
| 11 | "Fantasy" | Mariah Carey | 1995 | |
| 11 | "Dilemma" | Nelly featuring Kelly Rowland | 2002 | |

=== Most weeks on the chart ===
| Number of weeks | Song | Artist | Year* | Source |
|---|---|---|---|---|
| 67 | "Folded" | Kehlani | 2026 | |
| 54 | "Mutt" | Leon Thomas | 2026 | |
| 52 | "Too Close" | Next | 1999 | |
| 52 | "Go Crazy" | Chris Brown and Young Thug | 2021 | |
| 46 | "Big Energy" | Latto | 2022 | |
| 44 | "Calm Down" | Rema and Selena Gomez | 2024 | |
| 43 | "Sure Thing" | Miguel | 2023 | |
| 43 | "Die for You" | The Weeknd | 2023 | |
| 42 | "Where My Girls At?" | 702 | 2000 | |
| 42 | "Whats Poppin" | Jack Harlow featuring DaBaby, Tory Lanez and Lil Wayne | 2021 | |

*Year when the songs ended their respective chart runs.

=== Highest debut ===
| Debut Position | Song | Artist | Debut Date | Source |
|---|---|---|---|---|
| No. 5 | "Erotica" | Madonna | October 17, 1992 | |
| No. 10 | "Honey" | Mariah Carey | August 16, 1997 | |
| No. 11 | "That's the Way Love Goes" | Janet Jackson | May 1, 1993 | |
| No. 11 | "Wild Wild West" | Will Smith featuring Dru Hill and Kool Moe Dee | May 22, 1999 | |
| No. 11 | "All for You" | Janet Jackson | March 17, 2001 | |
| No. 11 | "In My Feelings" | Drake | July 21, 2018 | |
| No. 12 | "Right Here" | SWV | July 17, 1993 | |
| No. 13 | "Dreamlover" | Mariah Carey | August 14, 1993 | |
| No. 13 | "1999" | Prince | January 16, 1999 | |
| No. 14 | "Suit & Tie" | Justin Timberlake featuring Jay-Z | February 2, 2013 | |
| No. 14 | "Wild Thoughts" | DJ Khaled featuring Rihanna and Bryson Tiller | July 8, 2017 | |

=== Shortest climbs to number one ===
| Week reached number one | Song | Artist | Date reached number one | Source |
|---|---|---|---|---|
| 3rd week | "I'll Make Love to You" | Boyz II Men | August 27, 1994 | |
| 4th week | "I Will Always Love You" | Whitney Houston | December 5, 1992 | |
| 4th week | "Fantasy" | Mariah Carey | September 30, 1995 | |
| 4th week | "No Scrubs" | TLC | March 13, 1999 | |
| 4th week | "In My Feelings" | Drake | August 11, 2018 | |
| 5th week | 13 songs Latest song: "I Just Might" by Bruno Mars (February 21, 2026) | | | |

=== Longest climbs to number one ===
| Week reached number one | Song | Artist | Date reached number one | Source |
|---|---|---|---|---|
| 24th week | "Waterfalls" | TLC | August 5, 1995 | |
| 20th week | "Day 'n' Nite" | Kid Cudi | May 23, 2009 | |
| 20th week | "Sky Walker" | Miguel featuring Travis Scott | February 3, 2018 | |
| 20th week | "Prove It" | 21 Savage and Summer Walker | November 2, 2024 | |
| 19th week | "Don't Let Go (Love)" | En Vogue | February 15, 1997 | |
| 19th week | "Work Out" | J. Cole | December 31, 2011 | |
| 19th week | "Soak City" | 310babii | March 30, 2024 | |
| 18th week | 15 songs Latest song: "Is It a Crime" by Mariah the Scientist and Kali Uchis (December 20, 2025) | | | |

=== Biggest jump to number one ===
| Chart movement | Song | Artist(s) | Date reached number one | Source |
|---|---|---|---|---|
| 7–1 | "Barbie World" | Nicki Minaj and Ice Spice with Aqua | August 26, 2023 | |
| 6–1 | "I Will Always Love You" | Whitney Houston | December 5, 1992 | |
| 6–1 | "Funkdafied" | Da Brat | August 20, 1994 | |
| 6–1 | "Anxiety" | Doechii | May 3, 2025 | |
| 5–1 | 11 songs Latest song: "Yukon" by Justin Bieber (September 13, 2025) | | | |

=== Biggest drop from number one ===
| Chart movement | Song | Artist(s) | Date reached number one | Source |
|---|---|---|---|---|
| 1–9 | "Sugar on My Tongue" | Tyler, the Creator | December 20, 2025 | |
| 1–8 | "Good Flirts" | Baby Keem featuring Kendrick Lamar and Momo Boyd | June 20, 2026 | |
| 1–7 | "Shining" | DJ Khaled featuring Beyoncé and Jay-Z | May 20, 2017 | |
| 1–7 | "Prove It" | 21 Savage and Summer Walker | November 16, 2024 | |
| 1–7 | "Denial Is a River" | Doechii | April 26, 2025 | |
| 1–6 | 8 songs Latest song: "Obvious" by Chris Brown (June 27, 2026) | | | |

=== Shortest climbs to the top 10 ===
| Week reached top 10 | Artist(s) | Song | Date reached top 10 | Source |
|---|---|---|---|---|
| 1st week | "Erotica" | Madonna | October 17, 1992 | |
| 1st week | "Honey" | Mariah Carey | August 16, 1997 | |
| 2nd week | 30 songs Latest song: "Toosie Slide" by Drake (April 18, 2020) | | | |

=== Longest climbs to the top 10 ===
| Week reached top 10 | Song | Artist(s) | Date reached top 10 | Source |
|---|---|---|---|---|
| 25th week | "Macarena (Bayside Boys Mix)" | Los del Río | August 3, 1996 | |
| 23rd week | "Wild Side" | Normani featuring Cardi B | January 1, 2022 | |
| 21st week | "Dip It Low" | Christina Milian | August 28, 2004 | |
| 20th week | "Die for You" | The Weeknd | December 10, 2022 | |
| 19th week | "24 Hours" | TeeFlii featuring 2 Chainz | October 11, 2014 | |
| 19th week | "Father Stretch My Hands, Pt. 1" | Kanye West | November 5, 2016 | |
| 19th week | "Pussy Fairy (OTW)" | Jhené Aiko | July 25, 2020 | |
| 19th week | "How We Roll" | Ciara and Chris Brown | January 6, 2024 | |
| 18th week | 7 songs Latest song: "Pop Out" by Polo G featuring Lil Tjay (August 31, 2019) | | | |

== Artist records ==
=== Most number-one songs ===
| Number of singles | Artist | Source |
|---|---|---|
| 46 | Drake | |
| 17 | Rihanna | |
| 16 | Chris Brown | |
| 16 | The Weeknd | |
| 14 | Bruno Mars | |
| 13 | Kendrick Lamar | |
| 13 | Lil Wayne | |
| 13 | Usher | |
| 12 | Beyoncé | |
| 12 | Cardi B | |
| 12 | Doja Cat | |
| 12 | Nicki Minaj | |

=== Most cumulative weeks at number one ===
| Number of weeks | Artist | Source |
|---|---|---|
| 149 | Drake | |
| 99 | Rihanna | |
| 61 | Usher | |
| 47 | The Weeknd | |
| 46 | Mariah Carey | |
| 45 | Chris Brown | |
| 44 | Nelly | |
| 39 | Lil Wayne | |
| 38 | 50 Cent | |
| 38 | Kendrick Lamar | |

=== Most top 10 songs ===
| Number of singles | Artist | Source |
|---|---|---|
| 82 | Drake | |
| 58 | Chris Brown | |
| 44 | Lil Wayne | |
| 41 | Nicki Minaj | |
| 39 | Rihanna | |
| 30 | Usher | |
| 28 | Kanye West | |
| 27 | The Weeknd | |
| 26 | Beyoncé | |
| 26 | Ludacris | |

=== Most chart entries ===
| Number of entries | Artist | Source |
|---|---|---|
| 141 | Drake | |
| 127 | Chris Brown | |
| 110 | Lil Wayne | |
| 97 | Nicki Minaj | |
| 64 | Kanye West | |
| 63 | Future | |
| 59 | Jay-Z | |
| 58 | Snoop Dogg | |
| 57 | Pitbull | |
| 56 | Rihanna | |

=== Simultaneously four or more songs in the top 10 ===
- 50 Cent: April 2–16, 2005
  - "Candy Shop"
  - "Disco Inferno"
  - "Hate It or Love It" (The Game featuring 50 Cent)
  - "How We Do" (The Game featuring 50 Cent)
- T-Pain: October 20–November 10, 2007
  - "Shawty" (Plies featuring T-Pain)
  - "Cyclone" (Baby Bash featuring T-Pain)
  - "Good Life" (Kanye West featuring T-Pain)
  - "Kiss Kiss" (Chris Brown featuring T-Pain)
- T-Pain: November 24–December 29, 2007
  - "Kiss Kiss" (Chris Brown featuring T-Pain)
  - "Good Life" (Kanye West featuring T-Pain)
  - "Cyclone" (Baby Bash featuring T-Pain)
  - "Low" (Flo Rida featuring T-Pain)
- Lil Wayne: October 18–November 1, 2008
  - "Can't Believe It" (T-Pain featuring Lil Wayne)
  - "Got Money"
  - "Mrs. Officer"
  - "My Life" (The Game featuring Lil Wayne)
- Drake: March 30–April 20, 2013
  - "Fuckin' Problems" (ASAP Rocky featuring Drake, 2 Chainz and Kendrick Lamar)
  - "Started from the Bottom"
  - "Poetic Justice" (Kendrick Lamar featuring Drake)
  - "Love Me" (Lil Wayne featuring Drake and Future)
- Drake: August 27–September 3, 2016, September 17–October 1, 2016
  - "For Free" (DJ Khaled featuring Drake)
  - "Controlla"
  - "Too Good"
  - "One Dance"
- Drake: June 9, 2018
  - "Nice for What"
  - "God's Plan"
  - "Look Alive" (BlocBoy JB featuring Drake)
  - "Walk It Talk It" (Migos featuring Drake)
- Kendrick Lamar: February 1–March 15, April 12, 2025
  - "Squabble Up"
  - "TV Off"
  - "Luther"
  - "30 for 30"
- Kendrick Lamar: May 3, 2025
  - "Luther"
  - "30 for 30"
  - "Peekaboo"
  - "TV Off"

† 50 Cent became the first artist to post four top 10 songs simultaneously.

†† Kendrick Lamar became the first artist to post four top 10 songs simultaneously in a lead role.

=== Additional artist achievements ===
- Kendrick Lamar is the only artist to simultaneously occupy the top four ranks on the chart.

== Album records ==
=== Most number-one singles from an album ===
| Number of singles | Artist | Album | Year(s) | Source |
|---|---|---|---|---|
| 4 | Drake | Views | 2015–16 | |
| 4 | Post Malone | Hollywood's Bleeding | 2019 | |
| 4 | Doja Cat | Planet Her | 2021–22 | |
| 4 | Kendrick Lamar | GNX | 2025 | |
| 4 | Drake | Iceman | 2025–26 | |
| 3 | SZA | SOS † | 2022–24 | |

† SZA's SOS Deluxe: Lana, a reissue of the SOS album, featured two additional number-one single, "Saturn" and "30 for 30".

== See also ==
- Dance/Mix Show Airplay
- Mainstream Top 40
- List of artists who reached number one on the U.S. Rhythmic chart
