= Bunna Summa =

2025 single by BunnaB

Single by BunnaB
- Released: April 16, 2025
- Genre: Southern hip-hop
- Length: 2:27
- Label: APG
- Songwriters: Ereunna McCoy; Kristof
- Producer: Kristof

BunnaB singles chronology
"Awf Da Perky" (2025)	"Bunna Summa" (2025)	"A.T.L.A.N.T.A" (2025)

Music video
- "Bunna Summa" on YouTube

"Bunna Summa" is a song by American rapper BunnaB, released on April 16, 2025 and produced by Kristof. It gained traction on the video-sharing app TikTok and became BunnaB's breakout hit.

== Background ==
BunnaB previewed the song via a snippet on TikTok on April 4, 2025. It received widespread exposure mostly due to the lyrics in the end of the opening verse: "I drive the boat, these bitches follow / Fucked around and text my ex, oops, it was a typo / Shake, shake, shake, booty shake like a maraca / If you ain't throwin' ass, what the fuck you outside for?" According to Luminate, in the first week of release, "Bunna Summa" garnered 112,000 official on-demand U.S. streams, which increased to over 592,000, 1.4 and eventually two million streams by the next three weeks. On TikTok, the original snippet amassed over 584,000 views and the song's sound was used in over 51,000 videos by the middle of May.

== Critical reception ==
The song received generally positive reviews and has been considered a summer anthem by music critics. Alphonse Pierre of Pitchfork remarked "And now there's BunnaB's 'Bunna Summa,' a classic Atlanta block party anthem. Really, there are five or six BunnaB songs from the last month in this exact same mode—her recent tape, Ice Cream Summer, is a trip down memory lane so playful that the nostalgia doesn't seem too tryhard. 'Bunna Summa,' the best of the bunch, is the kind of lighthearted boozing song that makes you want to sit on the hood of a freshly waxed American-made car shootin' the shit with your friends all summer. 'Yeah, we 'bout to have fun/Yeah, summer's just begun/Party all night until we see the sun,' she casually shout-raps on the hook, basically doing a more upbeat version of Gucci Mane's 'Wasted.'" Angel Diaz of Billboard wrote "'Bunna Summa' should be played a lot as the weather starts to get warmer. The track, and her Ice Cream Summer EP that she dropped earlier this month, have a throwback sound, as the Atlanta rapper tries to recapture that mid-2000s Southern rap energy. Her music sounds like crisp white tees on a summer day." The Fader stated "You don't need to be from Atlanta to appreciate BunnaB's extremely Y2K rap-sounding heater 'Bunna Summa' but it'll make you wish you were. With its summer-ready lyrics — 'We outside and its gonna be a vibe / get your camera phone start an Instagram live / wear booty shorts showing extra skin and thighs' — it's built to be a Southern scorcher."

== Charts ==
Chart performance for "Bunna Summa"
Chart (2025)	Peak position
US Bubbling Under Hot 100 (Billboard)	15
US Hot R&B/Hip-Hop Songs (Billboard)	27
