= 1900Rugrat =

American rapper (born 2003)

- Born: Miles Spiel; August 8, 2003 (age 23); West Palm Beach, Florida, U.S.
- Origin: Limestone Creek, Florida, U.S.
- Genres: Southern hip-hop; trap; hardcore hip-hop
- Occupations: Rapper; songwriter
- Years active: 2017–present
- Labels: 300 Entertainment; Remain Solid
- Management: 100k Management

Miles Spiel (born August 8, 2003), known professionally as 1900Rugrat, is an American rapper known for his 2024 song "One Take Freestyle", which received gold certification by the Recording Industry Association of America (RIAA).

== Early life ==
Spiel was born in 2003. He does not know his biological parents and was adopted when he was around two weeks old. He grew up in Limestone Creek, Florida. According to Spiel, he started to become a "bad kid" at the age of six, when he met fellow rapper and close friend Rickfrmdacreek. He cited how he got "real close" with Rick's family to the point where they became his "second family"; during this time, Spiel would also get into a lot of altercations, leading to him getting kicked out of school. Due to his actions, his adopted parents kicked him out at 14, and he ended up moving in with Rick and his family.

Additionally, Spiel wrote how his inspiration growing up and to make music was influenced by Chief Keef and his album Finally Rich.

== Career ==
=== Early career and rise to fame (2016–2025) ===
Spiel began his music career around the age of 13 by posting songs on SoundCloud around 2017 or 2016. At some point early in his career, one of his ex-girlfriends deleted his SoundCloud account, which possibly resulted in losing much of his early music. He first gained public attention by posting freestyle rap videos on TikTok. He later gained widespread notoriety after releasing his "One Take Freestyle" in 2024. The song reached the #1 spot of Spotify's US Viral chart on October 24, 2024. Following this, he released additional tracks such as "Clean & Dirty" and "Dead Cracka," the latter featuring BLP Kosher. He and Philadelphia rapper Skrilla then released collaboration "Auntie Ain't Playin" on December 13, 2024. In 2024, Spiel performed at Rolling Loud Miami, where he first performed his collaboration with Kodak Black - a remix of One Take Freestyle, released on January 24, 2025. He performed at Rolling Loud California in March 2025.

=== Porch 2 the Pent, Big Ah Kidz and Fireman (2025–present) ===
In early 2025, Audible Treats, a New York-based publicity agency, named 1900Rugrat one of its "Artists to Watch." The New York Times described his style as having a "raspy voice" and a "fully formed sense of character." On February 28, 2025, Spiel released his mixtape Porch 2 the Pent. It contains 20 tracks and features guest appearances from BossMan Dlow, Rickfrmdacreek, Kodak Black, Lil Yachty, and Skrilla. In June 2025, it was announced that Spiel was featured on the 2025 Freshman XXL list. On November 7, 2025, Spiel released his commercial album, Big Ah Kidz, with features from Kyle Richh, Loe Shimmy, Quavo, Hunxho, BabyTron, BabyChiefDoit, Rio da Yung OG, Hurricane Wisdom, BAK Jay, and HeadHuncho Amir.

On January 14, 2026, it was announced that Spiel would be performing at his third Rolling Loud festival, to be held in Orlando, Florida, his home state. On January 22, 2026, Spiel signed with Electric Feel Publishing. Electric Feel CEO Austin Rosen praised the signing, saying that Spiel “brings a distinct voice to hip-hop and a sound that’s entirely his own.” On May 8, 2026, Spiel performed at Rolling Loud Orlando. On May 17, 2026, Spiel confronted Drake, claiming that he copied the beat for his song "Intro" from his mixtape Porch 2 the Pent on "Little Birdie" off of his album Iceman. On June 12, 2026, Spiel was featured on Kodak Black's mixtape Kodak the Blessing, where he appeared on the fifth track, titled "Nunchucks". On June 26, 2026, Spiel released his second studio album, Fireman, with features from Hotboii, Jorjiana, Trippie Redd, BLP Kosher, Slimesito, and Rickfrmdacreek. On November 6, 2026, Spiel released his third studio album Roll N' Rock, which had features from The HollywoodTwins, Judah Weston, Warhol.SS, and YNW Melly. On November 13, 2026, Spiel was featured on the track "Gangstalicious" with Tay K, which released off his debut studio album #MonstersUnderMyBed.

== Discography ==
=== Studio albums ===
List of studio albums, with selected details
Title	Studio album details
Big Ah Kidz	Released: November 7, 2025; Label: Remain Solid, 300; Format: Digital download, streaming
Fireman	Released: June 26, 2026; Label: Remain Solid, 300; Format: Digital download, streaming
Roll N' Rock	Released: November 6, 2026; Label: Remain Solid; Format: Digital download, streaming

=== Mixtapes ===
List of mixtapes, with selected details
Title	Mixtape details
Porch 2 the Pent	Released: February 28, 2025; Label: Remain Solid, 300; Format: Digital download, streaming
Free(Style) Game	Released: January 28, 2026; Label: Remain Solid, 300; Format: Digital download, streaming

=== Singles ===
Title	Year	Certifications	Album
"One Take Freestyle"	2024	RIAA: Gold	Porch 2 the Pent
"Clean & Dirty"	2024		Porch 2 the Pent
"Dead Cracka" (featuring BLP Kosher)	2024		Non-album single
"Auntie Ain't Playin" (featuring Skrilla)	2024		Porch 2 the Pent
"Lift Yourself Freestyle"	2025		Non-album single
"Ain't No Love" (featuring BabyChiefDoit and BAK Jay)	2025		Big Ah Kidz
"Where Da Fine Shyt" (featuring Rio da Yung OG)	2025		Big Ah Kidz
"Chicken Member" (featuring BabyTron)	2025		Big Ah Kidz
"Plane Jane"	2026		Non-album single
"100 Bowls"	2026		Fireman
"Dance Cracka" (featuring BLP Kosher)	2026		Fireman
"Pissed Me Off"	2026		Fireman
"Lil Birdy"	2026		Fireman
"Every Season" (with Skrilla)	2026		Fireman
