= Big Ah Kidz =

Studio album by 1900Rugrat
- Released: November 7, 2025
- Genres: Rage; trap
- Length: 45:02
- Label: 300 Entertainment
- Producers: 100yrd; Akachi; DOPE LEE; Fizzle; Frankie Bash; Ike; imkfed; jetsonmade; Josivh; J.R. Rotem; lizgin; Marc Boomin; MAYCRY; Neeko Baby; ProdBino; prodvaiii; Rarewtf; Thankutimmy; TooDope; Trenchmadethat; Vile; Yari

1900Rugrat chronology
Porch 2 the Pent (2024)	Big Ah Kidz (2025)	Free(Style) Game (2026)

Singles from Big Ah Kidz
- 1. "Where Da Fine Shyt"; 2. "Ain't No Love" Released: June 6, 2025; 3. "Every Week" Released: October 31, 2025; 4. "Hard" Released: November 6, 2025; 5. "Red Dead" Released: November 6, 2025

Big Ah Kidz is the debut studio album by American rapper 1900Rugrat. It was released on November 7, 2025, through 300 Entertainment. The album features 15 tracks, and features from Kyle Richh, Loe Shimmy, Quavo, Hunxho, BabyTron, BabyChiefDoit, Rio da Yung OG, Hurricane Wisdom, BAK Jay, and HeadHuncho Amir.

== Composition ==
One of the lead singles for the album, "Where da Fine Shyt", takes a rather straightforward approach, with Gabriel Bras Nevares citing how the track incorporates "minimal piano riffs and bell hits, persistent soft hi-hats, dry but quick kicks, and a sole string synth hanging in the background".

Michael Saponara of Billboard wrote how that "Hard" takes a rather "tranquil approach", rather than turning up over the chaotic beats he typically favors.

Eddy "Precise" Lamarre of RollingOut wrote how 1900Rugrat "mixes humor, heart, and pure energy across a tracklist that feels both chaotic and intentional. It's youthful, confident, and entirely his own lane".

Quincy Dominic of Rating Games Music wrote that Big Ah Kidz is filled with "wild punchlines, offbeat flows, and relentless energy that feels straight out of the trenches". His favorite tracks off the album are "Hard", "Every Week", "Chicken Member", "Ashes On My LV" and "Dat Like".

== Critical reception ==
XXL included "Where da Fine Shyt" in its list of the 13 best hip hop songs of the week of its release. Billboard also included "Hard" on their Best New R&B/Hip-Hop Fresh Picks of the Week playlist, with Michael Saponara writing, "Hunxho handles chorus duties before passing the baton to Rugrat, who calls out the fake demons who are “only killer in their captions". Amir bats third with a motivational assist, stamping himself as the voice of East Dallas.

Alexander Cole of HotNewHipHop described "Chicken Member" as a track filled with "chaotic fun", stating how the "off the wall production" is enhanced with BabyTron and Rugrat's hysterical and hilarious wordplay, all while delivering stream of conscious flows, Cole ends it off on a good note saying how despite the track being five minutes long, it's something that won't get listeners bored. For the lead single, "Every Week", Alexander Cole of HotNewHipHop wrote how the track has a "throwback vibe" to it, with all three rappers on the track delivering some melodic verses or hooks. Cole compliments the three, writing how "Quavo really does a great job in the middle of the song, while 1900Rugrat and Loe Shimmy show off their youthful exuberance".

== Track listing ==
Credits adapted from Tidal.

Big Ah Kidz track listing
No.	Title	Writer(s)	Producer(s)	Length
1.	"MF!!!"	Miles Spiel; Blake MacGregor	Rarwtf	3:19
2.	"Killed Barney"	Spiel; Ameer Abdullah; Jayce Kirkeberg; Khaled Jahir Fernandez	Imkfed; Jayce; Fooly	2:52
3.	"Red Dead (featuring Kyle Richh)"	Spiel; MacGregor; Henry Olatunde Fasheun; Josiah Halley	Rarewtf; Josivh	2:38
4.	"Ash On My LV"	Spiel; Timothy Adie	Thankutimmy	2:37
5.	"Sleeper Cell"	Spiel; Federico Luongo; Mikolaj Burdan	trenchmadeit; prodvaiii	3:00
6.	"Every Week (featuring Quavo and Loe Shimmy)"	Spiel; Quavious Keyate Marshall; Shamar Williams Cox; Jasper Hellwig	ProdBino	2:34
7.	"Dat Like (featuring Hurricane Wisdom)"	Spiel; Wisdom Mikeal Oluola; Yariel Gutierrez	Yari	2:08
8.	"Still Killed It"	Spiel; Francois Leclerc; Kyle Brooks	100yrd; Maycry	2:57
9.	"Tamagotchi"	Spiel; MacGregor	Rarewtf	2:29
10.	"Trumpets"	Spiel; Hunter Brown; Issa Sankofa Thomas; Lesidney Ragland	Akachi; Vile; Too Dope	3:08
11.	"Da Finish Line"	Spiel; Tahj Morgan; William Wilson; Dondre Moore	jetsonmade; Neeko Baby	3:08
12.	"Hard (featuring Hunxho and HeadHuncho Amir)"	Spiel; Amir Lucky; Colin Franken; Ibrahim Muhammad Dodo; Isaac Allwine; Joshua Goldenberg	Ike; Frankie Bash; Fizzle	3:36
13.	"Chicken Member (featuring BabyTron)"	Spiel; Islamov Timur Bakhtiyorovich; James Edward Johnson IV; Mikhail Baltachev	Dope Lee; Login	4:59
14.	"Where da Fine Shyt (featuring Rio da Yung OG)"	Spiel; Da'mario Donshay Horne-McCullough	Marc Boomin	2:08
15.	"Ain't No Love (featuring BabyChiefDoit and BAK Jay)"	Spiel; J.R. Rotem; Jayden Whittier-Jones; Jayvon Crump	J.R. Rotem; Xdkole	4:00

== See also ==
- 2025 in hip-hop
