= Hurricane Wisdom =

American rapper (born 2004)

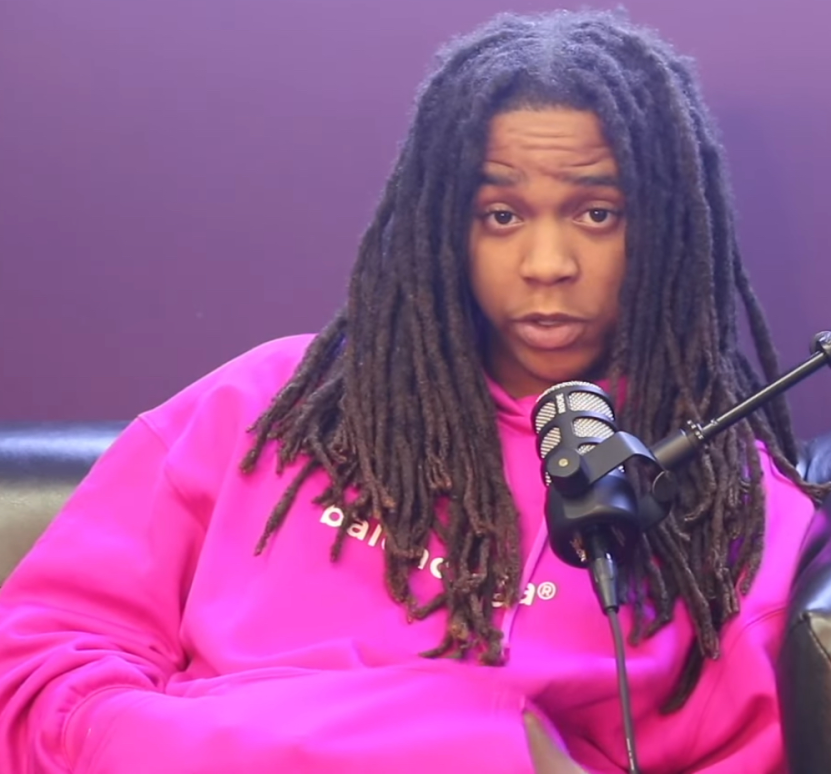
- Oluola in 2025
- Born: Wisdom Mikeal Oluola; April 5, 2004 (age 22); Tallahassee, Florida, U.S.
- Other names: Cane; Lil Hurricane
- Occupations: Rapper; singer; songwriter
- Years active: 2018–present
- Musical career
- Origin: Havana, Florida, U.S.
- Genres: Southern hip-hop; trap; pop rap; contemporary R&B
- Instrument: Vocals
- Labels: Rebel; Gamma

Instagram information
- Page: Wisdom🐢🇳🇬
- Years active: 2018–present
- Genre: Music
- Followers: 767 thousand

YouTube information
- Channel: Hurricane Wisdom
- Years active: 2020–present
- Genre: Music
- Subscribers: 511 thousand
- Views: 457.6 million
- Last updated: August 22, 2026

Logo
- Website: hurricanewisdommusic.com

Wisdom Mikeal Oluola (born April 5, 2004), known professionally as Hurricane Wisdom, is an American rapper, singer-songwriter, and social media personality. Born in Tallahassee, Florida, and growing up in Havana, Florida, Oluola started his music career in 2018 or 2019, although he started taking the career seriously in 2020, with his debut single being "Granny's Baby".

Oluola got into music by going to church and to school choirs. Oluola got his stage name from when he had wavy hair; he later got dreadlocks. A significant amount of Oluola's discography consists of a mix of hip-hop, southern hip-hop, trap, pop rap, and contemporary R&B. His song "Giannis" was his breakthrough single, gaining over 30 million streams on Spotify. He signed with Rebel Music, but Gamma, a partner of Rebel, distributes his tracks through their partnership. In 2021, he self-released his debut album Hurricane Season. Oluola's song "Drugs Callin" received two remixes from Lil Baby and Kodak Black and was listed on XXL's "13 Best New Hip-Hop Songs This Week".

He released his 2026 singles "Living Up" and "Barbie Doll" (with Chance the Rapper) with Gamma. Oluola was chosen as one of the twelve rappers featured on the XXL Freshmen Class of 2026. Throughout his career, Oluola has released eight studio albums, two extended plays, performed one live album, and recorded around seventy singles. In June 2026, Oluola announced an album titled Weathering the World; it was originally planned to be released on June 5, 2026, but it was later delayed and released on August 7, 2026.

== Early life and education ==
Wisdom Mikeal Oluola was born on April 5, 2004, in Tallahassee, Florida, but was raised in Havana, Florida, in a small town alongside eleven of his siblings. According to his own account, his environment was challenging from an early age. Oluola's father is from Taraba State, and his mother is from Kaduna State in Nigeria.

While still young, Oluola's mother got arrested on identity theft charges, causing Oluola to live with his grandmother for several years. During his pre-teen years, Oluola moved to Texas to attend school; he also began to get into music and rapping during his high school years by going to church and school choirs, in which he joined a church band at age eleven, where he would rap and perform. While living with his grandmother, she would expose Oluola to a lot of Donnie McClurkin.

== Career ==
=== 2020–2025: Early career, Giannis, Hurricane Season, and Perfect Storm ===
Oluola began his music career in 2018 or 2019 but started taking the career seriously in 2020, releasing music while still in his teens. He got the name "Hurricane Wisdom" from, at the time, his wavy hair until he got dreadlocks. His track "Giannis" became one of his most notable early hits, later receiving a remix featuring Polo G, which significantly increased his notability. His song "Drugs Callin'" featured two remixes from Lil Baby and Kodak Black, with the feature from Lil Baby being listed as the "13 Best New Hip-Hop Songs This Week" by XXL.

In 2021, he released his debut album, Hurricane Season. In March 2022, Oluola was featured in a song by SpotemGottem titled "Got a Lil Older". In an interview with AllHipHop, Oluola stated that he has plans to start writing music for other artists and possibly start his own record label in the future. His albums Perfect Storm and Perfect Storm: Sorry 4 The Rain reached Billboard 200.

=== 2025–2026: Rebel and Gamma sign, and "Winter's Over" ===
In March 2025, Oluola went on tour with BossMan Dlow and 1900Rugrat in Cincinnati. Oluola is featured on the Murda Beatz single "Winter's Over" alongside A Boogie wit da Hoodie in April 2025. On April 25, 2025, Oluola performed live at the "Hurricane Wisdom Official After Party" event at the OHM Nightclub in Seattle, Washington.

In July 2025, Oluola signed with the record labels Rebel Music and Gamma, in which his tracks are distributed through Gamma due to Rebel and Gamma's partnership. Oluola has released the singles "Living Up" and "Barbie Doll" with Gamma, both of which reached the Bubbling Under Hot 100.

=== 2026–present: "Barbie Doll", "Living Up", XXL Freshmen Class of 2026, and Weathering the World ===
In March 2026, Oluola released his debut Afrobeats song called "Living Up"; he later celebrated the success of the track. He was featured on the Tee Grizzley single "Hard Times" in March 2026. In 2026, Oluola released "Barbie Doll" with Chance the Rapper. Oluola was also featured on the Big Ah Kidz studio album by 1900Rugrat in the song "Dat Like". On May 10, 2026, Oluola performed on the Under Armour Stage at Rolling Loud in Orlando, Florida, which was livestreamed on Twitch and Amazon Music.

Oluola was one of the twelve rappers picked for the XXL Freshmen Class of 2026. Following the XXL Freshman Class of 2026, the featured artists, including Oluola, performed in Los Angeles to celebrate ten years of the XXL Freshman Class of 2016 at Rémy Martin Presents; it also included featured artists from the Class of 2016. Oluola freestyled alongside other 2026 freshmen in a cappella freestyle. He also did a cypher with Chris Patrick, La Reezy, Sosocamo, Slayr, and Miles Minnick, which was powered by Puma, Oluola later did a bonus cypher with the same group of artists too.

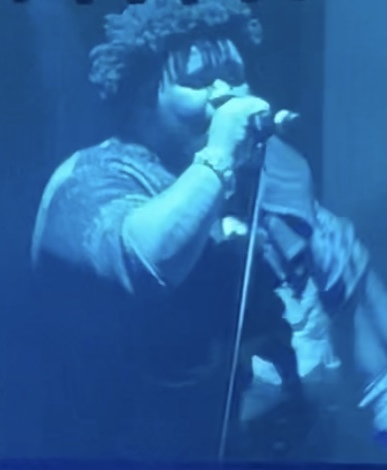
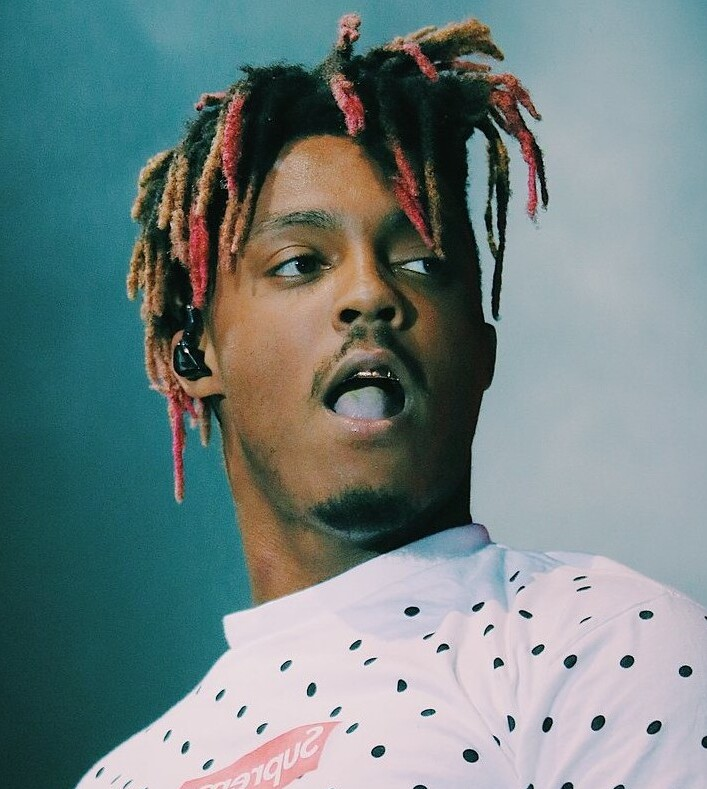
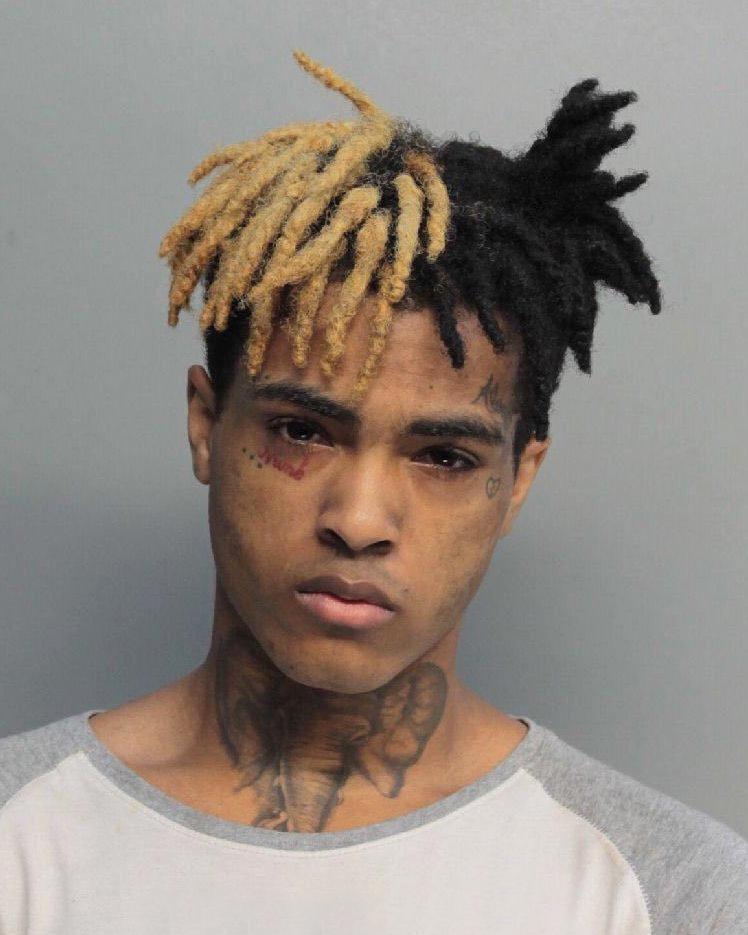
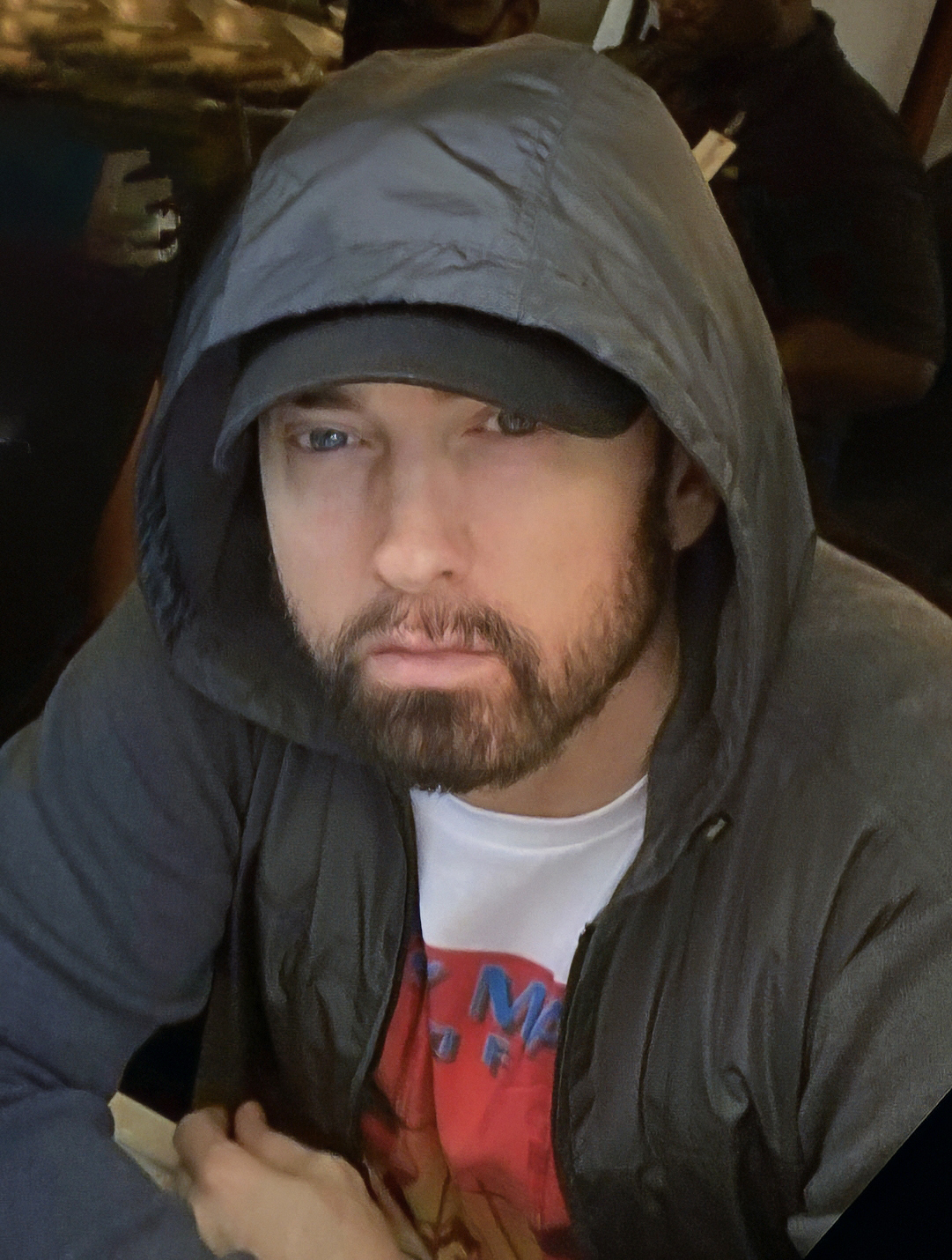
Rod Wave (top left), Juice Wrld (top right), XXXTentacion (bottom left), and Eminem are all inspirations for Oluola, according to him.

In May 2026, Oluola announced a new album titled Weathering the World, which was set to release on June 5, 2026, although it was delayed until August 2026. On July 24, 2026, a teaser trailer for the album was released, revealing that its release date was set for August 7, 2026. On August 7, 2026, Oluola released a song with American rapper Gunna titled "YK Where It's Goin" which later became the fourth track on his studio album Weathering the World.

== Artistry ==
In an interview with Uproxx and XXL, Oluola has cited Rod Wave, Fetty Wap, Young Thug, Chance the Rapper, Eminem, Post Malone, XXXTentacion, and Juice Wrld as influences on his music and style.

== Discography ==
=== Studio albums ===
Title	Artist(s)	Songs	Year	Ref
Hurricane Season	Hurricane Wisdom	11	2021	
The Calm Before The Storm (Hurricane Season Deluxe)	Hurricane Wisdom Bigga Rankin, T9ine, Major Nine	17	2021	
State of Emergency	Hurricane Wisdom NoCap, YNW BSlime, Spliffjit, Snow Banks, FCG Heem, LPB Poody	16	2022	
Category 5: The Biggest Hurricane	Hurricane Wisdom Hotboii, NoCap, Luh Tyler, Wizz Havinn, FCG Heem, NLE Choppa	17	2023	
Eye of the Storm	Hurricane Wisdom	17	2024	
Perfect Storm	Hurricane Wisdom Polo G, Skilla Baby, Loe Shimmy, ffawty, Raq baby, Fredo Bang, Dthang, Sleepy Hallow, Kidd G, NoCap	24	2025	
Perfect Storm: Sorry 4 The Rain	Hurricane Wisdom G Herbo, BabyChiefDoit, Hotboii, TnTXD, Sqweez, Soldier Kidd, reGGie, Raq baby, Lil Loaded, Lil Baby, Polo G, Skilla Baby, Loe Shimmy, ffawty, Raq baby, Fredo Bang, Dthang, Sleepy Hallow, Kidd G, NoCap	45	2025	
Weathering the World	Hurricane Wisdom, Gunna, Chance the Rapper,	19	2026	

=== Live albums ===
Title	Artist(s)	Songs	Year	Ref
The Live Sessions Vol. 1	Hurricane Wisdom	12	2025	

=== Extended plays ===
Title	Artist(s)	Songs	Year	Ref
Quit Talking To Me	Hurricane Wisdom	4	2024	
Slow Down	Hurricane Wisdom	5	2024	

=== Singles ===
==== As lead artist ====
Title	Artist(s)	Album/Mixtape	Year	Ref
Granny's Baby	Hurricane Wisdom LPB Poody	State of Emergency	2020	
AI	Hurricane Wisdom Luh Tyler	Non-album single	2023	
Real Me (remix)	Hurricane Wisdom NLE Choppa	Non-album single	2023	
Havinn It	Hurricane Wisdom Wizz Havinn	Non-album single	2023	
Giannis	Hurricane Wisdom	Non-album single	2024	
Who I Am	Hurricane Wisdom	Eye of the Storm	2024	
Winter's Over	Hurricane Wisdom A Boogie wit da Hoodie, Murda Beatz	Non-album single	2025	
Drugs Callin	Hurricane Wisdom Kodak Black	Perfect Storm	2025	
Drugs Callin Remix	Hurricane Wisdom Lil Baby	Perfect Storm: Sorry 4 The Rain	2025	
Living Up	Hurricane Wisdom	Non-album single	2026	
Over Now	Hurricane Wisdom	Non-album single	2026	
Barbie Doll	Hurricane Wisdom Chance the Rapper	Non-album single	2026	
YK Where It's Goin	Hurricane Wisdom Gunna	Weathering the World	2026	

==== As featured artist ====
Title	Artist(s)	Album/Mixtape	Year	Ref
Got A Lil Older	SpotemGottem Hurricane Wisdom	Back From The Dead	2021	
Round Here	Pai Napple Yungnbaby Hurricane Wisdom	Non-album single	2023	
I DONT REALLY CARE	TWOFOUR DELOREAN Hurricane Wisdom	Non-album single	2025	
FMB pt 2	Wolfacejoeyy Hurricane Wisdom	Non-album single	2025	
Hard Times	Tee Grizzley Hurricane Wisdom	Non-album single	2026	
Superstars	DD Osama Hurricane Wisdom	Non-album single	2026	
Lifestyle	Lil Mosey Hurricane Wisdom	Non-album single	2026	

== Tours ==
- Perfect Storm: No Umbrellas Tour (2025)
