= Skrilla =

American rapper (born 1999)

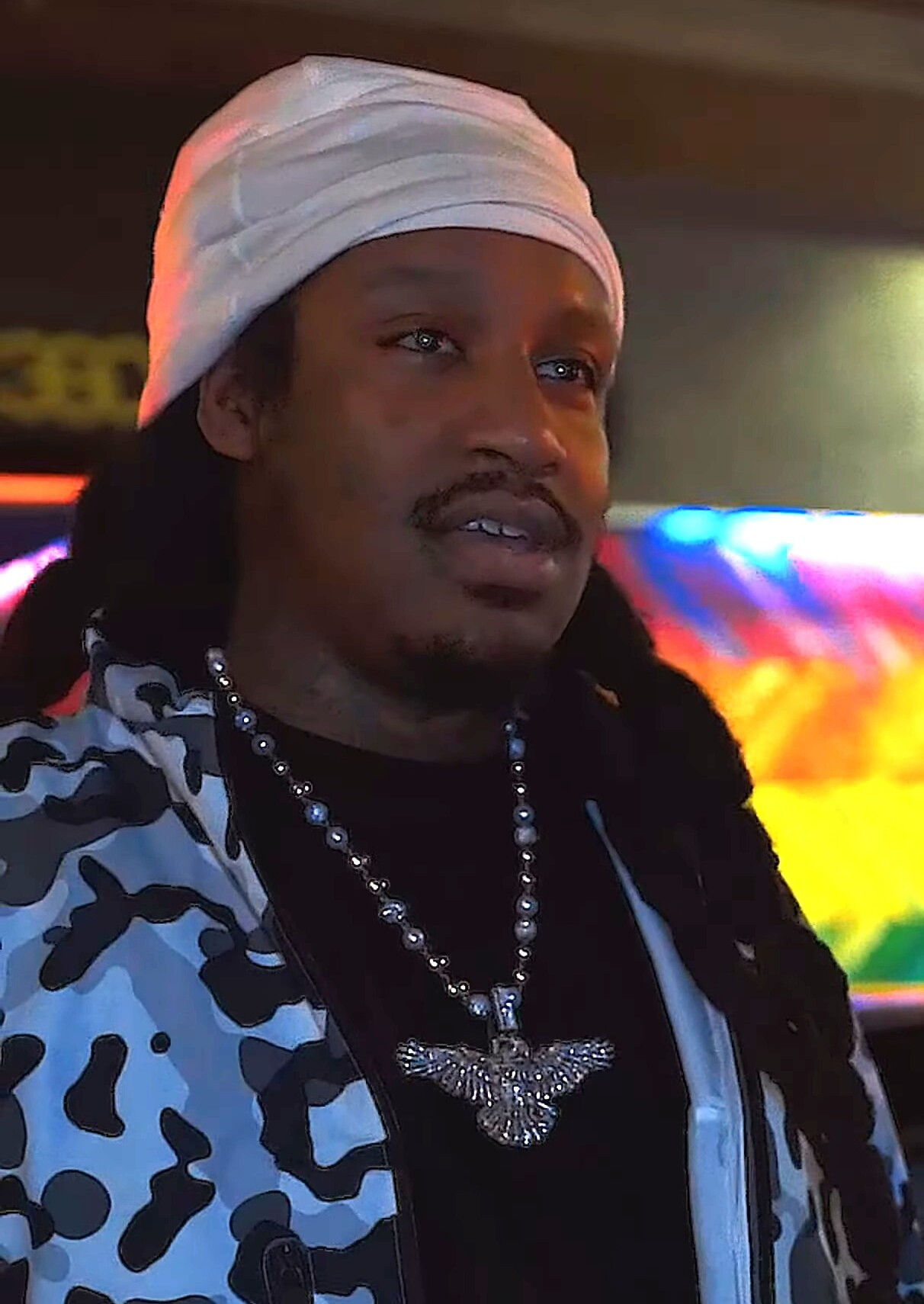
- Skrilla in 2025

Background information
- Also known as: Lord Skrilla; Z
- Born: Jemille Marrail Edwards; June 3, 1999 (age 27); Philadelphia, Pennsylvania, U.S.
- Genres: Hip-hop; philly; drill
- Occupations: Rapper; songwriter
- Instrument: Vocals
- Years active: 2018–present
- Label: Priority
- Website: inskrillawetrust.com

Jemille Marrail Edwards (born June 3, 1999), known professionally as Skrilla, is an American rapper and songwriter from Philadelphia, Pennsylvania, who is prominent in the drill music scene. He signed to Priority Records in 2023 and has released multiple albums through the label: UnderWorld (2023), Zombie Love Kensington Paradise (2024), Zombie Love Kensington Paradise (Deluxe) (2025), and Z (2026). His single "Doot Doot (6 7)" became popular on TikTok in 2025, sparking the "6–7" trend.

== Early life ==
Jemille Marrail Edwards was born on June 3, 1999 in Philadelphia and raised in Kensington, a neighborhood of Philadelphia that is widely known for its open-air drug trade. His mother is Mexican and from Texas, while his father is African-American and from Philadelphia. Edwards' parents met in college. He described his childhood as, "the best time of [his] life," and has stated that he began selling drugs in his neighborhood at around age 12. He also played basketball for the Amateur Athletic Union and ran cross country in his youth, but stopped playing sports to focus on selling drugs. He expressed his disinterest for basketball in November 2024.^{:5:19} As a teenager, he aspired to become a fashion designer and was a member of the Young Chances Foundation program. Though, he also said he always wanted to become a rapper growing up.^{:9:57} In 2013, he was involved in organizing a protest for the program against the acquittal of George Zimmerman in the killing of Trayvon Martin. He has stated that, while in high school, he spent two and a half years under house arrest following multiple heroin-related charges against him.

== Career ==
Edwards was inspired by fellow Philadelphia rapper RecoHavoc, his childhood friend, to begin rapping. He soon recorded Dog Food, his first song as Skrilla.^{:10:10} He released his debut single Green Snake in 2018. His mixtapes Kutthroat and Gemini Season were released in 2022 and 2023, respectively. He was signed to Priority Records in 2023 and released his first single Booted later that year with them. His additional singles GD, released in January 2024, and Bhrome Heart, released in August of that year, had followed. His album Underworld was released in early 2024 and its follow-up, Zombie Love Kensington Paradise, was released on November 1, 2024, with a deluxe version released on February 28, 2025. He also appeared on 03 Greedo's 2024 album Crip, I'm Sexy.

A snippet of Skrilla's song Doot Doot (6 7) was uploaded to TikTok by an anonymous account in September 2024. It was partially popularized by Taylen "TK" Kinney, a basketball player for the RWE team of the Overtime Elite league who recited the song's lyric "six, seven" in many of his interviews over several months, and through TikTok videos referencing basketball player LaMelo Ball's height, and by February 2025, it had been used in more than 126 thousand videos on TikTok. It was released as a single that month with a music video. Later that month, he posted on his Instagram account, inviting fans to the filming of a music video with livestreamer N3on in Kensington. It amassed a crowd of more than 200 people that was soon broken up by Philadelphia police officers. In late February, Kyle Pagan of Crossing Broad called Skrilla, "the hottest rapper in the city of Philadelphia right now." He embarked on his debut headlining tour in 2025. In April 2025, Skrilla plans to quit drugs after May 2025 for his next album, Z, but he expressed concern that it will promote drug abuse. He said he quit Nitrous Oxide in November 2024.^{:25:31}

== Musical style ==
Skrilla's music is largely drill mixed with rap and he is considered a prominent figure among Philadelphia drill artists. His lyrics often discuss selling and consuming drugs, also referencing santería and his Mexican heritage. His music videos usually feature drug users from Kensington. A.D. Amorosi of Metro called his melodies "raging and rough-edged" with "something swift and soulful about them", while Alphonse Pierre of Pitchfork described his flow as "woozy", "swerving", and "punctuat[ed] ...with unexpected pauses and purposeful stutters", and his beats as "eerie". For Passion of the Weiss, Harley Geffner defined Skrilla's rapping style as featuring "onomatopoeic" ad-libs and switching between "delicate" and "heavy" flows and "speed[ing]" and "slow[ing]" the pace of his rapping. He has stated that he makes all of his music while under the influence of drugs.

He has cited Kanye West, Kodak Black, Future, and Young Thug as influences on his music.

== Personal life ==
Edwards practices Santería. He discussed his beliefs in an interview titled "Skrilla On Sacrificing Goats And Chicken For His Religion" in August 2024. In August 2025, Edwards was working for a management deal with Miami Music MGMT and performed at the Lyrical Lemonade stage in Chicago. He additionally collaborated with YouTuber Brandon Buckingham for a vlog. He was shot in the neck mid-performance by a group of roughly five or six men who jumped out of a car, according to witness accounts. However, it is unclear whether Buckingham was also shot. In addition, DJ Akademiks assumed the news proclaimed Buckingham's cameraman was injured during the attack. After surgery, Edwards made a full but painful recovery from the wound, re-enabling his capability to speak.^{:33:53:38:35:39:52}

== Discography ==
=== Studio albums ===
List of studio albums, with release date and label shown
Title	Details
UnderWorld	Released: February 16, 2024; Label: Priority Records; Format: Digital download, streaming
BIP	Released: June 3, 2024; Label: Priority Records; Format: Digital download, streaming
Zombie Love Kensington Paradise	Released: October 31, 2024; Label: Priority Records; Format: Digital download, streaming
Zombie Love Kensington Paradise (Deluxe)	Released: February 28, 2025; Label: Priority Records; Format: Digital download, streaming
Z	Released: May 1, 2026; Label: Priority Records; Format: Digital download, streaming

=== Mixtapes ===
List of mixtapes, with release date and label shown
Title	Details
Kutthroat	Released: October 30, 2022; Label: Self-released; Format: Digital download, streaming
Thrilla (with THWAG LORD)	Released: December 24, 2022; Label: Boujie Boyz; Format: Digital download, streaming
Santos	Released: February 10, 2023; Label: Self-released; Format: Digital download, streaming
Gemini Season	Released: June 7, 2023; Label: Self-released; Format: Digital download, streaming

=== Singles ===
==== As lead artist ====
List of singles as lead artist with title, year, and album
Title	Year	Peak chart positions		Album
Title	Year	US Bub.	US R&B/ HH	Album
"Dog Food"	2018	—	—	Non-album singles
"Blue Cheese"	2018	—	—	Non-album singles
"Block Party"	2018	—	—	Non-album singles
"Ready"	2019	—	—	Non-album singles
"Green Snake"	2019	—	—	Big Dog
"Cuddies"	2019	—	—	Non-album singles
"Savages" (with Jonny Esco)	2019	—	—	Non-album singles
"187"	2020	—	—	Non-album singles
"OFF THE LEASH" (with Recohavoc)	2020	—	—	Non-album singles
"Murda Gang" (featuring 40ordy)	2020	—	—	Non-album singles
"24"	2020	—	—	Non-album singles
"Love Skrilla"	2021	—	—	Non-album singles
"Loose Fingers"	2021	—	—	Non-album singles
"KEVIN HART"	2022	—	—	Non-album singles
"Tellin You"	2022	—	—	Non-album singles
"PARTY"	2022	—	—	Non-album singles
"Golden Ticket"	2022	—	—	Non-album singles
"Get Back"	2022	—	—	Non-album singles
"D.I.Y"	2022	—	—	Non-album singles
"Neighborhood Hot Boii" (with Jonny Esco)	2022	—	—	Kutthroat
"Block Hot"	2022	—	—	Kutthroat
"All in"	2023	—	—	Santos
"Waldo" (directed by Ish.Prd)	2023	—	—	Kutthroat
"Mind Blown" (featuring Broadday PNB and FSDaBender)	2023	—	—	Non-album single
"Geeked Up"	2023	—	—	UnderWorld
"Monsters Inc."	2023	—	—	Non-album singles
"Too Bloody" (featuring Quilly)	2023	—	—	Non-album singles
"Yeah Its Me"	2023	—	—	Non-album singles
"June 3"	2023	—	—	Gemini Season
"Two Face 2 Face"	2023	—	—	Gemini Season
"Thug it out (FREE YOUNG THUG)"	2023	—	—	Non-album singles
"Striker"	2023	—	—	Non-album singles
"Booted"	2023	—	—	UnderWorld
"Stars in the Mirror" (featuring Rich Sinners)	2023	—	—	Non-album singles
"GOD DAMN"	2023	—	—	Non-album singles
"Blahdahdahdahdah"	2024	—	—	Zombie Love Kensington Paradise
"New Soul"	2024	—	—	UnderWorld
"Bhrome Heart"	2024	—	—	Zombie Love Kensington Paradise
"Matte Black"	2024	—	—	Zombie Love Kensington Paradise
"Resident"	2024	—	—	Zombie Love Kensington Paradise
"Straight Striker" (with Baby Kia)	2024	—	—	Non-album single
"Chiraq" (directed by 1mirs)	2024	—	—	Zombie Love Keshington Paradise (Deluxe)
"Walking Dead" (featuring Lil Uzi Vert)	2025	—	—	Non-album single
"Doot Doot (6 7)"	2025	10	45	Zombie Love Kensington Paradise (Deluxe)
"ABC"	2025	—	—	Zombie Love Kensington Paradise (Deluxe)
"Rich Sinners" (with Lil Yachty)	2025	24	35	Z
"RYLO" (featuring Rich Sinners and Lil Yachty)	2026	—	—	The Face of Zombie Land

==== As featured artist ====
List of singles as featured artist, showing year released and album title
Title	Year	Album
"Bowls in the Underworld" (1mirs featuring Skrilla, Ybcdul, and YoungBagChasers)	2023	Slide or Provide
"Free Stoopid" (FSDaBender featuring Skrilla)	2023	Non-album singles
"Praying to the Wrong God" (Rich Sinners featuring Skrilla)	2023	Non-album singles
"The Recipe" (THWAG LORD featuring Skrilla, Jaylanie, Quadie Diesel, and Bigrisky)	2023	Non-album singles
"Kick Door" (Cel NoLackin with Skrilla)	2023	Non-album singles
"Harriet" (Shakur Smalls featuring Skrilla)	2024	Non-album singles
"How" (Prince Dre with Skrilla)	2024	Non-album singles
"Curtis Jackson" (C Stunna with Skrilla and DJ Drama)	2024	Still Stuntin
"MLK" (1mirs featuring Skrilla)	2024	It Starts Here 2
"Dear YBC" (Rich Sinners featuring Skrilla)	2024	Non-album single
"Slips & Knots 2" (6KFly featuring Skrilla)	2024	Miracle Baby 2
"Fitness" (Quan'ta with Skrilla and D. Savage)	2024	Non-album singles
"Dring" (Jwles with Skrilla)	2024	Non-album singles
"Paradox" (Paradox Lab featuring Skrilla)	2024	Non-album singles
"Slide Musik"	2024	PreSeason
"Shirtoff" (Perfect Timing with Skrilla)	2024	Everything Comes with Perfect Timing
"Judo" Guapo featuring Skrilla	2024	Non-album singles
"Shoestrings on Lanvins" (Philly Heat featuring Skrilla)	2024	Non-album singles
"Cadavers" (Midnvght featuring Skrilla)	2024	Non-album singles
"Auntie Ain't Playin'" (1900Rugrat featuring Skrilla)	2024	Porch 2 the Pent
"PARTY PACK" (Scooby Stackz featuring Skrilla)	2024	Non-album singles
"All on My Shit" (Bo Gotti and Kaz Miyagi featuring Skrilla)	2025	Non-album singles
"Money" (Sonata featuring Skrilla)	2025	Non-album singles
"Dead Body" (MAF Teeski featuring Skrilla)	2025	Slick SZN 2
"Storm Catchers" (Millyz featuring Skrilla)	2025	Non-album single

=== Guest appearances ===
List of non-single guest appearances, showing year released, other artists and album
Title	Year	Other artist(s)	Album
"Exotic Hots"	2023	FSDaBender	Murder Music
"Nothing Else"	2023	FSDaBender	Murder Music
"Gunz N Butta"	2023	OT the Real	Red Summer
"Chase Em Til He Trip"	2023	FSDaBender	Murda Music 2
"Meet the Reaper"	2023	1mirs	It Starts Here
"Intuition"	2023	The Vybe	For Those Who Matter
"Not a Glock Party"	2023	Zy Benji	Grab the Belt
"Damn!"	2024	Cel NoLackin	Highspeed Music
"Same Night"	2024	Lil Tony	2 Sides 2 Every Story (Deluxe)
"Trim"	2024	FSDaBender	Everything But Death
"Going Dum"	2024	Lil Scoom89	Nightmares Over East
"Trouble Boys"	2024	Bloodie, DudeyLo, Roscoe G	Bloodbath
"Upstate Coke Bender"	2024	Chito Ranas	Hoodrich Hector
"Bippin' Great"	2024	DjSlimebxll, DoodiBabby	Tried to Tell Em
"Dribble"	2024	DjSlimebxll, Jwles	Tried to Tell Em
"Good Timing"	2024	03 Greedo, GrindHard E	Crip, I'm Sexy
"Onomatopoeia"	2024	Zy Benji	In a Month of Sundays
"Glockboyz"	2024	Ola Runt	Backseat Muzik, Vol. 5
"Do a Hit"	2024	MAF Teeski, Big Opp	Big Scoom (Vol. 1)
"Sanity"	2025	DoodiBabby, FSDaBender, RecoHavoc	I Am a Rich Sinner
"Lets Do It"	2025	Luh Monk	Archives (Act 2)
"Chosen"	2025	Lil Hawa	1st Lady Trey
"Hat Collection"	2025	1mirs, FSDaBender, Zy Benji	It Starts Here 2
"Goyard"	2025	1mirs, C Stunna, BabyQah, RahhForeign	It Starts Here 2
"Fuego"	2025	KayGlizzy	Locked In
"Rick Owen's Glowin'"	2025	Reese Youngn	Pain or Problems
"Real"	2025	Brezzo	Impatient
