= One Take Freestyle =

2024 single by 1900Rugrat

Single by 1900Rugrat

from the album Porch 2 the Pent
- Released: September 13, 2024
- Recorded: 2024
- Genre: Hip-hop
- Length: 2:59
- Label: Remain Solid; 300
- Songwriters: Miles Spiel; Mekhi Mobley; Markus Randle; Rodney Hill; William Roberts; Nayvadius Wilburn
- Producer: Mobley

1900Rugrat singles chronology
"Demure" (2024)	"One Take Freestyle" (2024)	"Mr. Get it Gone" (2024)

Remix cover
- Cover art of the official remix featuring Kodak Black.

Kodak Black singles chronology
"Miami with the Heat" (2024)	"One Take Freestyle (Remix)" (2025)	"Cluck" (2025)

Music video
- "One Take Freestyle" on YouTube
- "One Take Freestyle Remix" on YouTube

"One Take Freestyle" is a song by American rapper 1900Rugrat, released on September 13, 2024. Originally a freestyle to "U.O.E.N.O." by Rocko featuring Future and Rick Ross, it gained widespread recognition upon release and is considered his breakout hit. The song is also the lead single from his debut mixtape, Porch 2 The Pent (2025). An official remix featuring American rapper Kodak Black was released on January 23, 2025.

== Background ==
In 2024, 1900Rugrat had been releasing freestyles on the video-sharing platform TikTok. They gradually gained traction, leading to him receiving calls from record labels. On September 8, 2024, 1900Rugrat released a freestyle to a chopped-up version of "U.O.E.N.O." titled "One Take". It particularly garnered significant attention, partly due to his heavy Florida drawl and wordplay, as well as him being white. Shortly after, he recorded the song in a booth. His verses mostly were unchanged, but he now landed on downbeats instead of skipping over them. The song was released to streaming services five days later in September, with cover art featuring a photo of himself on a high-rise apartment balcony. A music video for the song was released a couple weeks later. In October, 1900Rugrat performed the song on On the Radar Radio, helping the song receive further exposure. He signed a deal with Remain Solid and 300 and received co-signs from Kodak Black, Justin Bieber, Lil Uzi Vert and Drake. Los Angeles Dodgers player Mookie Betts started using "One Take Freestyle" as his walk-up song when walking to home plate at Dodger Stadium.

1900Rugrat addresses being a white rapper in the opening line of the song: "Cracker got an AR like he shootin' schools up". In regard to these lyrics, 1900Rugrat told Complex: The first bar... pushed the boundaries a little bit. People hear that, and I feel like a lot of people are scared to laugh sometimes. Everybody's so scared with the way the world is now, so I just kind of poke fun at the world a little bit."

== Critical reception ==
Zachary Horvath of HotNewHipHop commented: "When you're evaluating a fresh talent, you want to see if you can spot a standout feature about them. For 1900Rugrat it's his blunt and quotable bars. In a way, he reminds of KOSHER due to the ability to be so absurd. However, where 1900 differs is in his curb-stomping delivery. His most viral track, 'One Take Freestyle,' is chockful of egregious and unapologetic comparisons. It's part of the reason it's racked up over 50 million streams across all streaming platforms according to a press release."

== Remix ==
An official remix of the song was released on January 23, 2025. It features Kodak Black, who dismisses allegations of colorism and reflects on growing from his past experiences.

== Certifications ==
Region	Certification	Certified units/sales
United States (RIAA)	Gold	500,000^{‡}
^{‡} Sales+streaming figures based on certification alone.
