= Doot Doot =

Doot Doot may refer to:

- Doot-Doot, a 1983 album by Freur
- "Doot Doot (6 7)", a 2025 song by Skrilla
