= Doot Doot (6 7) =

Single by Skrilla

from the album Zombie Love Kensington Paradise (Deluxe)
- Released: December 2024 (unofficial); February 7, 2025 (official)
- Recorded: 2024
- Genre: Drill; trap
- Length: 2:29
- Label: Priority
- Songwriters: Jemille Edwards; Ellis Uhl
- Producer: 1Ellis

Skrilla singles chronology
"Hat Collection" (2025)	"Doot Doot (6 7)" (2024)	"Maison Language" (2025)

Music video
- "Doot Doot (6 7)" on YouTube

"Doot Doot (6 7)" is a drill rap song by American rapper Skrilla. It was initially released via Priority Records on February 7, 2025, and was later included as a bonus track on the deluxe edition of his album Zombie Love Kensington Paradise (2024). The track was produced by 1Ellis. Following its release, the song became a viral social media phenomenon thanks in large part to the repeated lyric, "... I know he dyin' / 6-7 (oh my God) / I just bipped right on the highway (bip, bip)," which plays at the beat drop. The numeric refrain "6-7" rapidly evolved into online slang and a meme phrase, particularly on TikTok and Instagram, with multiple media sources noting its ambiguous but pervasive usage.

== Background, release, and promotion ==
Before its official release, "Doot Doot (6 7)" was unofficially released to platforms in December 2024, Following the unofficial release on social media, the song's repeated lyric, "6-7", quickly gained traction on social media. Kansas commit and Overtime Elite basketball player Taylen Kinney later went viral for being strongly associated with the emerging meme after he said "six-seven" to a Starbucks rating. Due to this, he was later given the nickname "Mr 67".

Two months later, the track was officially released on February 7, 2025. Following the track's release, it immediately went viral on social media due to the amount of usage it got on edits relating to basketball star, LaMelo Ball, who shared the same height as the two numbers.

The meaning behind the two numbers is still up to questions among fans, with some connecting it to 67th Street in Skrilla's hometown of Philadelphia, or to 67th Street in Chicago. Linguist and African-American English expert Taylor Jones has speculated that it may refer to "10-67", the police radio code used to notify of a death. This aligns with the previous lines' descriptions of gun violence and his interpretation that the line depicts the narrator playing innocent during a traffic stop. Skrilla himself has stated, "I never put an actual meaning on it and I still would not want to." The term later became word of the year by Dictionary.com in 2025.

== Usage in media ==
Skrilla stated in an interview that the song would be featured in the video game Grand Theft Auto VI, where he would also appear as himself.

== Charts ==
Chart performance for "Doot Doot (6 7)"
Chart (2025)	Peak position
US Bubbling Under Hot 100 (Billboard)	10
US Hot R&B/Hip-Hop Songs (Billboard)	45
