= Went West =

2025 single by BabyChiefDoit

Single by BabyChiefDoit

from the album Rambo
- Released: June 27, 2025
- Genre: Hip-hop; drill; trap
- Length: 2:36
- Label: APG
- Songwriters: Jayden Jones; Isaiah Simmons
- Producers: BabyChiefDoit; Questionizer

BabyChiefDoit singles chronology
"Hot Out" (2025)	"Went West" (2025)	"Riley N Lamilton (Lunch Break Freestyle)" (2025)

Music video
- "Went West" on YouTube

"Went West" is a song by American rapper BabyChiefDoit, released on June 27, 2025. It was produced by BabyChiefDoit himself and Questionizer. It serves as the lead single to his 2026 album Rambo.

== Composition ==
The production begins with a piano melody that builds up to a trap-style beat with horns and bass. Lyrically, BabyChiefDoit revolves around the harsh realities of life, growing up in Chicago and his rise to fame. He also acknowledges he produced the song's beat and compares himself to Kanye West for that reason.

== Critical reception ==
Zachary Horvath of HotNewHipHop called the song an "absolute banger with its blaring symphony of horns, earth-shattering bass, and aggressive trap percussion", adding that the beat drop following the piano riff was "well worth the wait." He also wrote that "BabyChiefDoIt doesn't disappoint either went it kicks in as he delivers a passionate performance on the verses" and "Given just how young he is, his breath control is outstanding, and he certainly doesn't sound like most young MCs."

== Music video ==
The music video was released alongside the single. It features footage of BabyChiefDoIt's performance at Lyrical Lemonade's Summer Smash music festival.

== Charts ==
=== Weekly charts ===
Weekly chart performance for "Went West"
Chart (2025)	Peak position
US Billboard Hot 100	71
US Hot R&B/Hip-Hop Songs (Billboard)	21

=== Year-end charts ===
Year-end chart performance for "Went West"
Chart (2025)	Position
US Hot R&B/Hip-Hop Songs (Billboard)	87
