= 6-7 =

2025 Internet meme and slang term

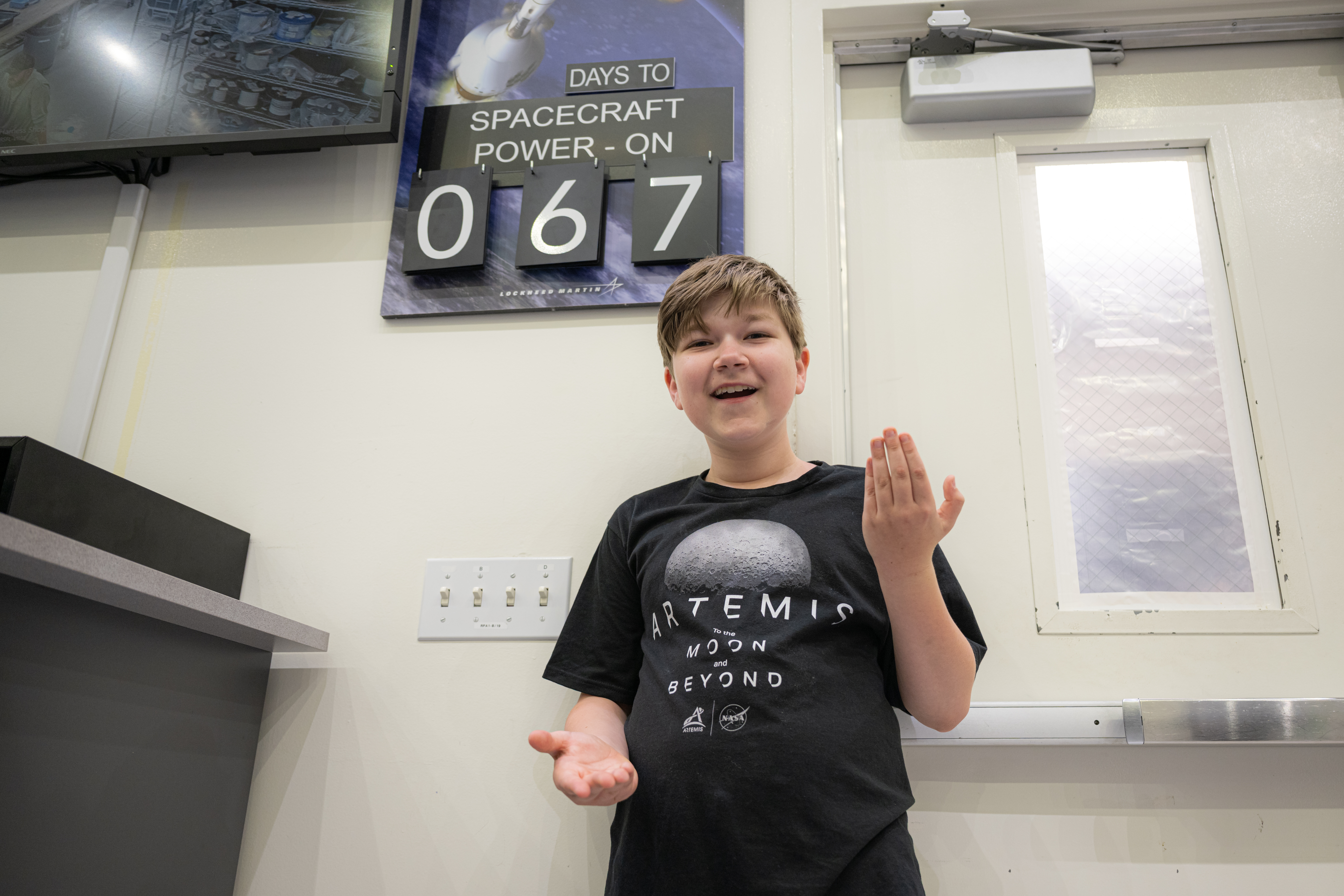
An 11-year-old doing the 6-7 gesture in NASA's Kennedy Space Center, April 2026

6-7 (pronounced "six seven"; also written as 67 or 6 7) is an Internet meme, slang term, and gesture that became popular in mid 2025 on TikTok and Instagram Reels. It has no fixed meaning.

The phrase originated from the drill rap song "Doot Doot (6 7)" by American rapper Skrilla, which became popular in video edits featuring professional basketball players, especially LaMelo Ball, who is listed as 6 ft 7 in (2.01 meters) in height. Overtime Elite player Taylen Kinney helped spread the phrase through his repeated use of it. The meme was further popularized in March 2025, when a boy named Maverick Trevillian became known as the "67 Kid" after a viral video showed him yelling the term at a basketball game while performing an excited hand gesture.

The meme has been linked by multiple news outlets to the wider brain rot phenomenon—digital media deemed to be of poor quality. Some commentators also see it as evidence of Gen Alpha's growing presence in Internet culture.

== Origin ==
The slang term originated from the drill rap song "Doot Doot (6 7)", in which American rapper Skrilla raps: "... I know he dyin' (oh my, oh my God) 6-7, I just bipped right on the highway (Bip, bip)" as the beat drops. The meaning of the number in the song remains ambiguous: some have connected it to 67th Street in Skrilla's hometown of Philadelphia, or to 67th Street in Chicago. Linguist and African-American English (AAE) expert Taylor Jones has speculated that it may refer to "10-67", the ten-code used by Philadelphia police to notify officers of a death. This aligns with the previous lines' descriptions of gun violence and his interpretation that the line depicts the narrator playing innocent during a traffic stop. Skrilla himself stated: "I never put an actual meaning on it, and I still would not want to".

Initially released in December 2024 before receiving an official release on February 7, 2025, the song was used in social media video "edits" of professional basketball players, particularly LaMelo Ball, who is 6 ft 7 in (2.01 m) tall. Some weeks after the December release, Taylen Kinney, a high school basketball player at Overtime Elite, said "six, seven" after being asked to rate a Starbucks drink in a clip that went viral on social media. His repeated use of the phrase in Overtime Elite content led to his nickname "Mr. 6-7", and he later launched a "6-7"-branded canned water line.

== Spread ==
A person doing the gesture associated with the "6-7" meme

The meme has been referenced in NBA highlights, WNBA news conferences, NFL touchdown celebrations, and by celebrities, including former NBA player Shaquille O'Neal, who participated in a video referring to it despite admitting he did not understand its meaning. Additionally, the term has been frequently used throughout college sports.

As the meme expanded beyond sports, social media users began using it in unrelated contexts, such as joking about scoring 67% on an exam. 6-7's identity as a slang term has allowed it to spread in offline contexts, especially in schools, with some banning its use due to disruption in classrooms. In November 2025, Keir Starmer, the British Prime Minister, apologized to a headteacher after joining schoolchildren in the gesture when a schoolgirl sitting next to him noted the book they were reading was turned to pages 6 and 7; the gesture had been banned at the school.

State legislator Bill Buckbee, who represents the 67th district in the Connecticut House of Representatives, referenced the phrase during a special legislative session, and congressman Blake Moore of Utah's 1st congressional district made reference to the trend while presiding over the United States House of Representatives on November 18, 2025. In December 2025, JD Vance, the Vice President of the United States, jokingly proposed to ban the use of the phrase after his five-year-old child screamed "6-7" in the middle of a church service. Vance stated: "And now I think we need to make this narrow exception to the First Amendment and ban these numbers forever".

As the popularity of "6-7" expanded, several variants emerged. These include 41 (pronounced "forty-one"), deriving from the song "41 Song (Saks Freestyle)" in which rapper Blizzi Boi raps the number throughout. Another variant is "6-1" (pronounced "six one"), created by TikTok creator Spartan Swot with the intention of satirising the original clip.

During the Christmas season, several variants of Christmas songs incorporating the 6-7 meme and other brain rot terms were popular on platforms such as TikTok. One example was "6-7 Merry Rizzmas".

In May 2026, Pope Leo XIV performed the "6-7" hand gesture during a meeting with young Catholic pilgrims from the Archdiocese of Genoa in Vatican City, after being encouraged by the youth to do so. The video of the interaction was posted online by the priest and internet personality Don Roberto Fiscer. Fiscer noted that because children worldwide use the greeting, the Pope's participation allowed the youth to feel a sense of "closeness" and show that they considered him "one of us." He mimicked the gesture again during his visit to Spain in June.

Calendar dates matching the meme's numbers has also led to the observation of the "6-7 Weekend". On weekends such as June 6–7, 2026, social media users and companies celebrate the event, with some businesses offering themed promotions and discounts based on the numbers.

=== 67 Kid ===
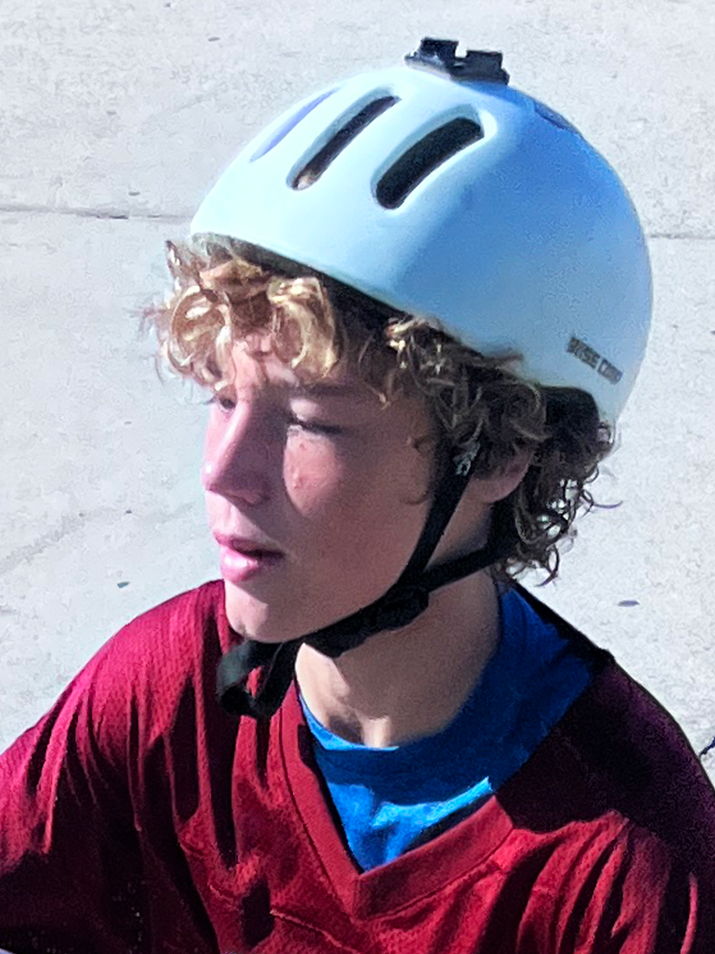
Maverick Trevillian, better known as the "67 Kid", at a fan meetup in Venice Beach, California, 2025

On March 31, 2025, YouTuber Cam Wilder posted a video titled "My Overpowered AAU Team has Finally Returned!" (stylized in all caps) in which a boy, Maverick Trevillian—later nicknamed the "67 Kid"—yells "six seven" while performing a hand gesture in which he moves his hands up and down with upward-facing palms.

In August 2025, social media users began creating photo edits distorting Trevillian in a bizarre or grotesque fashion, likened to analog horror. This meme, called "SCP-067 Kid", satirizes the SCP Foundation, a collaborative fiction project about paranormal anomalies.

=== Use by media and brands ===
On October 15, 2025, the 1st episode of season 28 of the adult animated show South Park aired with a prominent plot point in which the children are brainwashed by the 6-7 meme. This season of South Park, along with season 27, also targeted other online trends such as Labubus, TikTok, and prediction markets.

On October 27, 2025, the mobile game Clash Royale added an emote referencing the meme after its Instagram account reached 6.7 million followers. On November 5, first-person shooter video game Overwatch 2 announced that it would be adding a "67" emote to the game. On November 29, 2025, Fortnite Battle Royale teased their new Chapter 7 update with a reference to the 6-7 meme; the emote was officially released in mid-December.

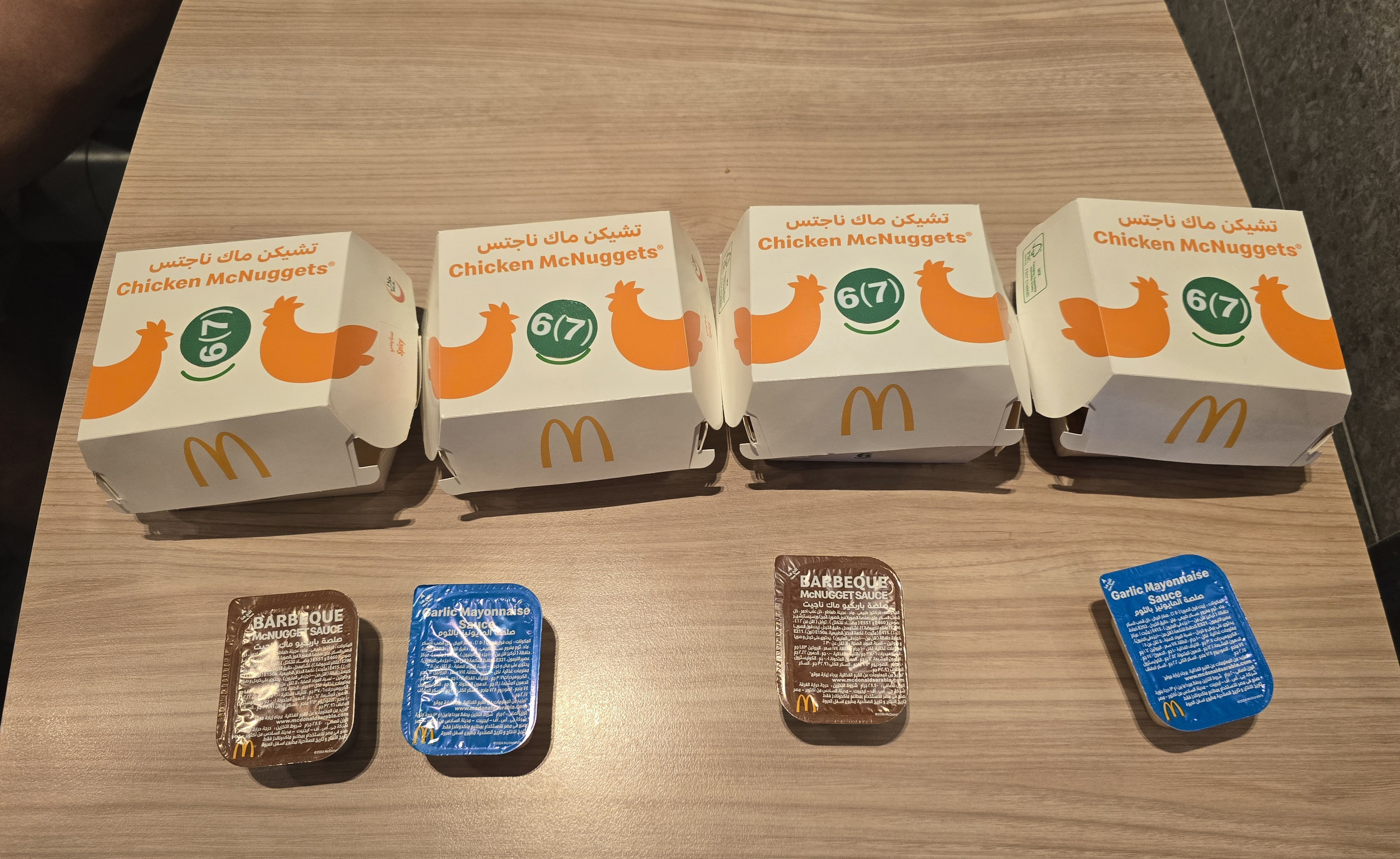
Chicken nuggets from McDonald's UAE with the special "6(7)" sticker

From November 6 to 7, Pizza Hut sold chicken wings for 67 cents each. During the same period, McDonald's in the United Arab Emirates (UAE) gave away free Chicken McNuggets between 6 and 7 p.m. Each 6-piece chicken pack featured a special "6(7)" sticker and contained seven nuggets instead of the usual six. Domino's offered members a one-topping pizza for $6.70 when they used the promo code "67". Later, in December 2025, Google introduced an Easter egg in which typing "6-7", "67", "6 7", or "six seven" causes a user's screen to shake up and down, mimicking the gesture associated with the meme. Restaurant chain In-N-Out removed the number "67" from its ordering system after mobs of teenagers began to scream whenever the number was called out.

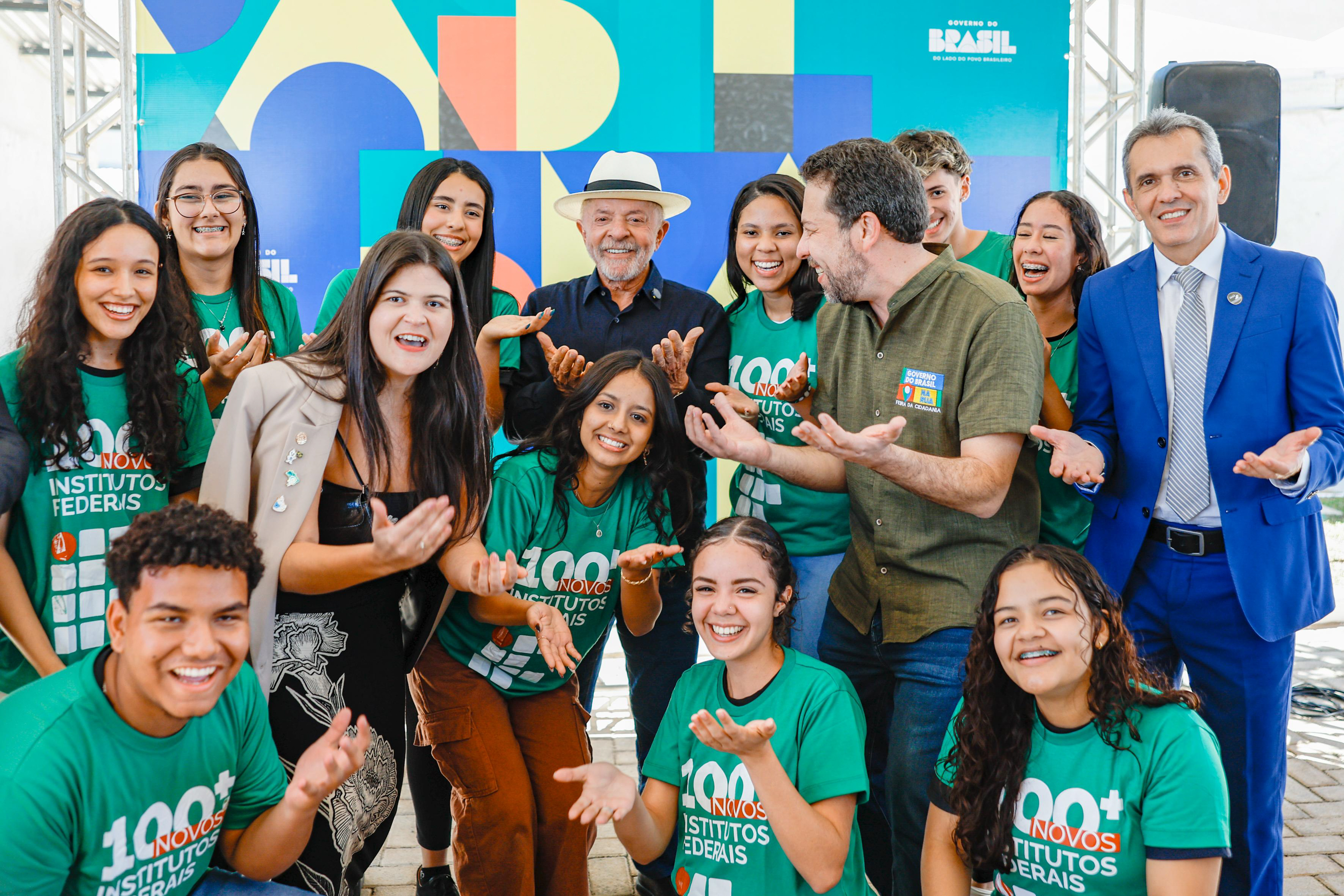
Brazilian president Lula da Silva doing the 6-7 gesture with students

In February 2026, former U.S. vice president Kamala Harris revived her social media campaign account "Kamala HQ" as "Headquarters 6-7" in an effort to connect with and "mobilize" young voters ahead of the 2026 US midterm elections; this was reverted the next day after the rebranding was met with mockery, with some commenters describing Harris's attempt to appeal to young people with the "6-7" meme as "cringe" and "out of touch".

=== Decline ===
In March 2026, Suzy Byrne of Yahoo Life reported that, as part of the "Great Meme Reset"—an effort to "reset" meme culture—teenagers who continued to use "6-7" were asked mocking questions such as: "who left you in 2025?". Furthermore, Byrne wrote that the number of edits to the 6-7 meme article on Wikipedia had decreased over time.

== Reception and analysis ==
Multiple news outlets, such as Business Insider, have attributed the meme to the wider phenomenon of brain rot—the spread of digital media considered to be of poor quality. Many viewed the meme as a sign of Generation Alpha's increasing involvement in Internet culture.

In October 2025, Dictionary.com named "67" as its 2025 Word of the Year, describing the interjection as "a burst of energy that spreads and connects people long before anyone agrees on what it actually means". The Merriam-Webster dictionary defines it as "a nonsensical expression connected to a song and a basketball player". The Swedish Institute for Language and Folklore included "six seven" in its 2025 new word list, also defining it as "a nonsensical expression".

Children's culture researchers Rebekah Willett, Amanda Levido, and Hyeon-Seon Jeong described the meme as a use of secret language by children similar to Pig Latin, the Cool S, the L hand sign, and back slang. They cited the meme's low barrier to entry as a key factor in its popularity, allowing it to quickly spread across different cultural and language contexts.

Alphonse Pierre of Pitchfork lamented that, in exchange for virality, Skrilla had been reduced to a one-dimensional mascot, and "not a human artist with music packed with complicated views and morals worth considering".

== See also ==
- 23 skidoo – Early 20th century American slang phrase; has ambiguous origins and is used nonsensically
- 42 § The Hitchhiker's Guide to the Galaxy – Arbitrary number popularized by book
- 47 § Pomona College – Arbitrary number popularized by college alumni
- 69 § In culture – Number similarly considered humorous, being sexual slang
- At sixes and sevens – English idiom that also uses these numbers
- Italian brainrot – 2025 AI-generated Internet memes
- Nonce word – Lexeme created for a single occasion
- Skibidi Toilet – YouTube web series that spawned the nonsense word "skibidi"
- Verity – YouTube web series that became a meme and widely compared to "6-7"
