= Limestone Creek, Florida =

- CDP
- Interactive map of Limestone Creek, Florida
- Coordinates: 26°56′36″N 80°08′27″W
- Country: United States
- State: Florida
- County: Palm Beach

Area
  - Total: 0.39 sq mi (1.01 km^{2})
  - Land: 0.39 sq mi (1.01 km^{2})
  - Water: 0 sq mi (0.00 km^{2})
- Elevation: 7 ft (2.1 m)

Population (2020)
  - Total: 1,316
  - Density: 3,365.1/sq mi (1,299.27/km^{2})
- Time zone: UTC-5 (Eastern (EST))
  - Summer (DST): UTC-4 (EDT)
- ZIP code: 33458
- Area codes: 561, 728
- FIPS code: 12-40562
- GNIS feature ID: 2403233

Limestone Creek is a census-designated place (CDP) in Palm Beach County, Florida, United States. It is part of the Miami metropolitan area of South Florida. The population was 1,316 at the 2020 US census.

== Geography ==
It is an enclave community surrounded by Jupiter on all sides, and located near Indiantown Road and Interstate 95.

According to the United States Census Bureau, the CDP has a total area of 1.01 km^{2} (0.39 sq mi), all land.

== Demographics ==
Historical population
Census	Pop.	Note	%±
2000	569		—
2010	1,014		78.2%
2020	1,316		29.8%
U.S. Decennial Census

=== Racial and ethnic composition ===
Limestone Creek, Florida – Racial and ethnic composition Note: the U.S. census treats Hispanic/Latino as an ethnic category. This table excludes Latinos from the racial categories and assigns them to a separate category. Hispanics/Latinos may be of any race.
Race / Ethnicity (NH = Non-Hispanic)	Pop 2000	Pop 2010	Pop 2020	% 2000	% 2010	% 2020
White alone (NH)	61	163	308	10.72%	16.07%	23.40%
Black or African American alone (NH)	439	614	435	77.15%	60.55%	33.05%
Native American or Alaska Native alone (NH)	1	7	13	0.18%	0.69%	0.99%
Asian alone (NH)	6	14	64	1.05%	1.38%	4.86%
Native Hawaiian or Pacific Islander alone (NH)	0	0	4	0.00%	0.00%	0.30%
Other race alone (NH)	0	2	17	0.00%	0.20%	1.29%
Mixed race or Multiracial (NH)	8	27	45	1.41%	2.66%	3.42%
Hispanic or Latino (any race)	54	187	430	9.49%	18.44%	32.67%
Total	569	1,014	1,316	100.00%	100.00%	100.00%

=== 2020 census ===
As of the 2020 census, Limestone Creek had a population of 1,316. The median age was 33.5 years. 28.0% of residents were under the age of 18 and 7.3% of residents were 65 years of age or older. For every 100 females, there were 107.9 males, and for every 100 females age 18 and over, there were 105.0 males.

100.0% of residents lived in urban areas, while 0.0% lived in rural areas.

There were 377 households in Limestone Creek, of which 41.6% had children under the age of 18 living in them. Of all households, 49.1% were married-couple households, 18.3% were households with a male householder and no spouse or partner present, and 24.4% were households with a female householder and no spouse or partner present. About 14.9% of all households were made up of individuals, and 4.8% had someone living alone who was 65 years of age or older.

There were 396 housing units, of which 4.8% were vacant. The homeowner vacancy rate was 3.7% and the rental vacancy rate was 1.7%.

=== Demographic estimates ===
According to the 2020 ACS 5-year estimates, there were 239 families residing in the CDP.

=== 2010 census ===
As of the 2010 United States census, there were 1,014 people, 273 households, and 166 families residing in the CDP.

=== 2000 census ===
As of the census of 2000, there were 569 people, 157 households, and 124 families living in the CDP. The population density was 488.2 people/km^{2} (1,264 people/mi^{2}). There were 166 housing units at an average density of 142.4 units/km^{2} (369 units/mi^{2}). The racial makeup of the CDP was 17.22% White (10.7% were Non-Hispanic White), 77.33% African American, 0.18% Native American, 1.05% Asian, 1.76% from other races, and 2.46% from two or more races. Hispanic or Latino of any race were 9.49% of the population.

In 2000, there were 157 households, out of which 45.2% had children under the age of 18 living with them, 42.0% were married couples living together, 31.2% had a female householder with no husband present, and 20.4% were non-families. 15.9% of all households were made up of individuals, and 3.8% had someone living alone who was 65 years of age or older. The average household size was 3.62 and the average family size was 4.02.

As of 2000, in the CDP, the population was spread out, with 38.8% under the age of 18, 7.7% from 18 to 24, 29.9% from 25 to 44, 16.3% from 45 to 64, and 7.2% who were 65 years of age or older. The median age was 28 years. For every 100 females, there were 96.2 males. For every 100 females age 18 and over, there were 81.3 males.

In 2000, the median income for a household in the CDP was $31,125, and the median income for a family was $30,875. Males had a median income of $33,239 versus $22,750 for females. The per capita income for the CDP was $12,195. About 7.0% of families and 8.5% of the population were below the poverty line, including 6.1% of those under age 18 and 34.5% of those age 65 or over.

As of 2000, 100% of the population spoke English as their first language.

== Notable person ==
- 1900Rugrat, rapper
