= Rich Sinners =

2025 single by Skrilla & Lil Yachty

Single by Skrilla and Lil Yachty
- Released: October 17, 2025
- Genre: Hip-hop
- Length: 2:38
- Label: Priority; Capitol
- Songwriters: Jemille Edwards; Miles McCollum; Vladimir Pavlovich
- Producer: Yababykid

Skrilla singles chronology
"Kurt Angle" (2025)	"Rich Sinners" (2025)

Lil Yachty chronology
I Don't Care... (2025)	Rich Sinners (2025)

"Rich Sinners" is a song by American rappers Skrilla and Lil Yachty, released by Priority and Capitol Records on October 17, 2025. It was produced by Yababykid.

== Composition ==
"Rich Sinners" has four verses—two for each rapper. In the first, Skrilla "reveals where some of his newfound money has been going". In the second, he references Free Willy. Also in the second, Lil Yachty "insists that he's not scared of his supposed enemies", and that "they're all talk". In the third, Skrilla "marvels some more at his own come-up". In the fourth and final verse, Lil Yachty "offers up one of the finest bars of his career".

== Reception ==
Alexander Cole of HotNewHipHop said that "Rich Sinners" "comes with some dope word play from both artists. Not to mention, we get some menacing production that adds weight to the lyrics. It is a fun song, and one that we're sure you all will be bumping throughout the weekend". Commercially, the song peaked at number 24 on the Billboard Bubbling Under Hot 100 chart, and peaked at number 35 on the Hot R&B/Hip-Hop Songs chart.

== Personnel ==
Credits adapted from Tidal.

- Jemille Edwards – composer, lyricist
- Miles McCollum – composer, lyricist
- Vladimir Pavlovich – producer, composer, lyricist
- Brian Stanley – mixing engineer
- Dave Huffman – mastering engineer
- Joe Turzillo – recording engineer
- Delano Robinson – A&R
- Vidal Barclay – A&R
- Liz Isik – A&R administrator

== Charts ==
Chart performance
Chart (2025)	Peak position
US Bubbling Under Hot 100 (Billboard)	24
US Hot R&B/Hip-Hop Songs (Billboard)	35
