= Living Up (song) =

2026 single by Hurricane Wisdom

Single by Hurricane Wisdom
- Released: March 20, 2026
- Genre: Afrobeats
- Length: 2:36
- Label: Rebel; Gamma
- Songwriter: Wisdom Oluola

Hurricane Wisdom singles chronology
"Over Now" (2026)	"Living Up" (2026)	"Enough" (2026)

"Living Up" (stylized in all caps) is a song by American rapper, singer, and songwriter Hurricane Wisdom. The track was released on March 26, 2026 and is the first Afrobeats song by Hurricane Wisdom.

== Composition ==
The song is an Afrobeats track with a mix of melodic rap, being the first of Hurricane Wisdom's songs to feature an Afrobeats style. It starts out with gentle drums and a keyboard, with Hurricane Wisdom rapping mainly about how he's living life to his fullest whilst also talking about drugs, romance, and purchasing new items. The song ends with a bouncing drum.

== Reception ==
Alexander Cole, an author at HotNewHipHop, gave positive feedback on the song, stating that Hurricane Wisdom did a "phenomenal job" and "we hopefully hear him on more Afrobeats-inspired production in the future."
