= Giannis (song) =

2024 single by Hurricane Wisdom

Single by Hurricane Wisdom

from the album Perfect Storm: Sorry 4 The Rain
- Language: English
- Genre: Hip-hop
- Length: 2:01
- Label: Rebel; Gamma
- Songwriter: Wisdom Oluola

Hurricane Wisdom singles chronology
"Who I Am" (2024)	"Giannis" (2024)	"Salute" (2024)

"Giannis" is a song by American rapper Hurricane Wisdom. The song was released on August 17, 2024, later becoming a track on his album Perfect Storm: Sorry 4 The Rain.

== Composition ==
The song is a hip-hop track with an upbeat tone; the song is also named after basketball player Giannis Antetokounmpo. Throughout the song, Hurricane Wisdom mainly raps about loving money and sexual activities.

== Reception ==
The song later featured a remix from Polo G. Pitchfork ranked the track at "#36 best song of 2024". The remix of Giannis was picked as one of the "R&B/Hip-Hop Fresh Picks of the Week" by Billboard.
