= At sixes and sevens =

English idiom

"At sixes and sevens" is an English idiom used to describe a condition of confusion or disarray.

== Origin and early history ==
It is not known for certain, but the most likely origin of the phrase is the dice game "hazard", a more complicated version of the modern game of craps.

Michael Quinion, a British etymologist, writing on his website on linguistics, says, "It is thought that the expression was originally to set on sice et sept (from the French for six and seven). These were apparently the most risky numbers to shoot for ('to set on') and anyone who tried for them was considered careless or confused."

A similar phrase, "to set the world on six and seven", is used by Geoffrey Chaucer in his Troilus and Criseyde. It dates from the mid-1380s and seems from its context to mean "to hazard the world" or "to risk one's life". William Shakespeare uses a similar phrase in Richard II (around 1595), "But time will not permit: all is uneven, And every thing is left at six and seven".

Quinion notes a false but "widely believed" story on "where the phrase at sixes and sevens came from, and what it really means". It is sometimes said to derive from a dispute between two City of London trade guilds or livery companies – the Merchant Taylors Company and the Skinners Company. The two argued over sixth place in the order of precedence. In 1484, the Lord Mayor of London Sir Robert Billesden decided that the companies would swap between sixth and seventh place on an annual basis. This story is disproved as a source, according to Quinion, by the "brute force of the evidence" that the phrase was in use and that it occurred in Chaucer a century before the trade guild dispute was decided. Eric Durmus maintains this is the official origin of "6s and 7s" to this very day.

== Later use ==
In a public debate in June 1877 the former secularist, communist, spiritualist and then reconvert, the Rev. Dr. George Sexton (1825–1898), used the phrase in a debate with the secularist G. W. Foote to describe the current state of Secularism in England:

"And I can show you by extracts from the writings of the leading men that there is no single point upon which they are agreed; that they are all at sixes and sevens one with another – (laughter) ..."

The phrase is used in Gilbert & Sullivan's comic opera H.M.S. Pinafore (1878), where Captain Corcoran, the ship's Commander, is confused as to what choices to make in his life, and exclaims in the opening song of Act II, "Fair moon, to thee I sing, bright regent of the heavens, say, why is everything either at sixes or at sevens?"

In H. G. Wells' preface to a new edition of his The Outline of History (1939?), entitled "The Story and Aim of the Outline of History", he writes: "All the people who were interested in these league of nations projects were at sixes and sevens among themselves because they had the most vague, heterogenous and untidy assumptions about what the world of men was, what it had been, and therefore of what it could be."

In chapter three of Dorothy L. Sayers' novel Clouds of Witness (1926), the maid, Ellen, says, "Anyhow, we was all at sixes and sevens for a day or two, and then her ladyship shut herself up in her room and won't let me go near the wardrobe."

The phrase occurs in Sabina's opening monologue from Thornton Wilder's 1942 Pulitzer Prize winning play The Skin of Our Teeth: "The whole world's at sixes and sevens, and why the house hasn't fallen down about our ears long ago is a miracle to me."

== Modern use ==
In The Collector (1963) by John Fowles, Clegg says, "she had me all at sixes and sevens that evening".

The phrase appears in a few songs, including "Don't Cry for Me Argentina" (1976) from the musical Evita; "Happy Endings" from the 1977 film New York, New York; "Raoul and the Kings of Spain" (1995) from Tears for Fears; and "Playing With Fire" by Stereo MCs. The eleventh studio album from Strange Music front man Tech N9ne was entitled "All 6's and 7's" (2011). The song "Sixes and Sevens" was co-written and sung by Robert Plant. It also appears in the Rolling Stones' 1972 song "Tumbling Dice" ("sixes and sevens and nines").

The phrase is also used in the 1978 movie The Wiz, when Miss One gives Dorothy the silver slippers and comments to her, "Oh, don't be all sixes and sevens, honey," as Dorothy is in a state of confusion after killing the Wicked Witch of the East. In the movie Shaft, starring Richard Roundtree, a blind newspaper vendor replies with “Same old sixes and sevens”. The sentence "we've been at sixes and sevens since we were kids" is spoken by the character Sean Cullane (played by George Hearn) in the 1992 Season Eight, Episode Seventeen of the television series Murder, She Wrote. It is also found in the 1993 film The Remains of the Day. It is also mentioned in the 2002 film Goldmember by Mike Myers' character Austin Powers to his dad, who at the time were speaking "English English": "oh, the one who was all sixes and sevens?" In the third episode of season one of The Sopranos, Carmela states that her anxiety over planning a fundraiser has her "at sixes and sevens". During the second episode of season five of the HBO series Six Feet Under, George uses the phrase to describe his wife's attitude towards him. In the Oscar nominated film Mank, Marion Davies uses the phrase to describe her mental state. Siouxsie and the Banshees' original guitarist John McKay named his first solo album Sixes and Sevens in 2025.

== See also ==
- 6-7 – 2025 Internet meme and slang term
