= Porch 2 the Pent =

Mixtape by 1900Rugrat
- Released: February 28, 2025
- Recorded: 2024–2025
- Genre: Hip-hop
- Length: 53:59
- Label: 300 Entertainment
- Producers: 1prodglory; 5screws; Akachi; Aruni; BeatsByTaz; BHeavy; Chedeezybeats; Cheeze Beatz; Chris Marek; Cloud; DJ Moon; DP Beats; Enspro; Fakez; Lah; Lemy; Lukovic; LXCI; Mackey; Mobleyyy; Platna; PradaDidIt; Prodbylandn; ProdKyle; Reallyindig0; Sheffmade; SLOWBURNZ; SMOKHIX; Splited Stupid; Swank (C$D); Trenchmadethat; Wick Kid Beats; Xair

1900Rugrat chronology
Porch 2 the Pent (2025)	Big Ah Kidz (2025)

Singles from Porch 2 the Pent
- 1. "One Take Freestyle" Released: September 13, 2024; 2. "Auntie Ain't Playin (feat. Skrilla)" Released: December 13, 2024; 3. "One Take Freestyle Remix (feat. Kodak Black)" Released: January 23, 2025

Porch 2 the Pent is the debut studio mixtape by 1900Rugrat. It was released on February 28, 2025, through 300 Entertainment. The album has 20 tracks, and features from Lil Yachty, Rickfrmdacreek, Skrilla, Kodak Black, and BossMan Dlow. The album's lead single, "One Take Freestyle", was released on September 13, 2024.

== Background ==
I can't even describe it in words. The first song got crack in it. That shit just going to be wild. It is a real-life rags-to-riches story. Because I really went from the porch to the penthouse. So it's like how Drake said "0 to 100." But I can't steal his shit. I can't just say rags to riches. That's boring. I had to put it my own way and it fit just like that. I really went from my granny porch to the 50th floor. I'm like, "Why the fuck my ears popping in the elevator, bitch?" This shit brand new to me, all this shit.

— 1900Rugrat

Before the mixtape's release, 1900Rugrat took to social media to announce the release of the mixtape, which was set to be on February 24, 2025. Six days later, Rugrat released a trailer to help build up hype for the mixtape. Along with the announcement, Rugrat also announced that he would be making a guest appearance on BossMan Dlow's Dlow Curry Tour as one of the featured supporting acts.

== Composition ==
Porch 2 the Pent spans 20 songs and 54 minutes; the mixtape, according to Devin Morton of HotNewHipHop, features beats that reflect the recent Florida sound. Morton notes similarities to what BossMan Dlow raps over, who also appears on the track "Cheat Codes," and highlights production by Akachi, known for his work with Chief Keef and DJ Khaled, bringing big bass and loud 808s to several songs. The review points out collaborations with Lil Yachty on "Bussin Baby" and Kodak Black on a remix of "One Take Freestyle," emphasizing Rugrat's connection to his Florida peers. Morton concluded that while 1900Rugrat's long-term impact is uncertain, the album demonstrates he is aiming to define his career beyond a single viral moment.

== Critical reception ==
=== Overview ===
Professional ratings
Review scores
Source	Rating
RapReviews	6/10

Porch 2 the Pent received positive reviews from music critics. Toby Adeyemi of Rolling Out wrote that the mixtape is a great introduction to 1900Rugrat for those who are not familiar with his music. Steven Louis of Passion of the Weiss mentioned how Porch 2 The Pent spans 20 songs across three distinct styles: frenetic Flockaveli crunk, Mannie Fresh–inspired tracks, and a closing set of drawling trap croons. Vivian Medithi of The Fader wrote how Porch 2 the Pent sees 1900Rugrat expand his sound without compromising anything. Medithi complimented the diversity of the tape, writing that there is a "loose narrative arc," noting how 1900Rugrat switches from "harder-hitting gangster raps to its plusher, more aspirational cuts." In a RapReviews critique of Porch 2 the Pent, Steve "Flash" Juon gave the mixtape a 6 out of 10 score, praising the project for its ambitious length, solid choice of collaborators such as Lil Yachty and BossMan Dlow, and raw, autotune-free vocal delivery that showcased a distinctive Florida drawl. However, Juon criticized much of the lyrical content as cliched and derivative, arguing that many songs added little new to the genre despite Rugrat's unique background and sound, ultimately making the project feel too similar to that of his peers rather than truly standing out.

=== Songs ===
Louis highlighted Rugrat's self-awareness and humor, pointing to lines like "white boy with a big stick, call me Cracker Barrel”, while praising his ability to out-grime Skrilla on "Auntie Ain't Playing", also noting how Kodak Black addresses accusations of colorism on the "One Take Freestyle" remix. Louis further mentioned how Rugrat addresses his challenging upbringing—growing up without knowing his parents and moving through adoptive care and Limestone's sheriff's department—and observed that on the album, he sounds thankful, triumphant, and fully "booted up and turnt out." Quincy of Ratings Game Music picked out his five favorite tracks from Porch 2 the Pent, naming "One Take Freestyle" with Kodak Black as the top song, calling it a wild, high-energy remix powered by a sped-up "UOENO"-style beat.

== Track listing ==
No.	Title	Length
1.	"Intro"	2:39
2.	"Way 2 Geeked"	3:24
3.	"Bussin Baby (featuring Lil Yachty)"	2:46
4.	"Dyin Bout Respect (featuring Rickfrmdacreek)"	3:08
5.	"She Keep It Drip"	2:46
6.	"Auntie Ain't Playin (featuring Skrilla)"	2:00
7.	"Dirty Ahh Soda"	2:10
8.	"One Take Freestyle Remix (featuring Kodak Black)"	3:42
9.	"Never Dat"	2:12
10.	"Clean & Dirty"	2:42
11.	"Cheat Codes (featuring BossMan Dlow)"	3:14
12.	"Two Tone Maybach"	2:00
13.	"WTF"	1:42
14.	"Lmk"	4:08
15.	"Molly Girl"	3:33
16.	"Playin Safety"	2:01
17.	"Tender"	2:12
18.	"February 7th"	2:12
19.	"Never Been the Same"	2:53
20.	"One Take Freestyle"	2:59
Total length:		53:59

== See also ==
- 2024 in hip-hop
