= Drugs Callin Remix =

2025 remix by Hurricane Wisdom and Lil Baby

Remix by Hurricane Wisdom and Lil Baby

from the album Perfect Storm: Sorry 4 The Rain
- Language: English
- Released: August 8, 2025
- Genre: Hip-hop; southern hip-hop
- Songwriters: Wisdom Oluola, Dominique Jones

Hurricane Wisdom and Lil Baby singles chronology
"Drugs Callin" (2025)	"Drugs Callin Remix" (2025)	"No Fatigue" (2025)

"Drugs Callin Remix" is a remix of the single "Drugs Callin" by American rappers Hurricane Wisdom and Lil Baby. The song was released on August 8, 2025.

== Composition ==
The song is a mix of hip-hop and southern hip-hop, sampling Future's Perkys Calling song.

== Reception ==
Gabriel Bras Nevares from HotNewHipHop mostly had a positive review on the track, saying that Lil Baby's verse was "nothing to write home about," also saying that "Hurricane Wisdom shows a lot of promise." The song was listed by XXL magazine as one of the 13 Best New Hip-Hop Songs This Week".
