= Hazard (game) =

Early English game played with two dice

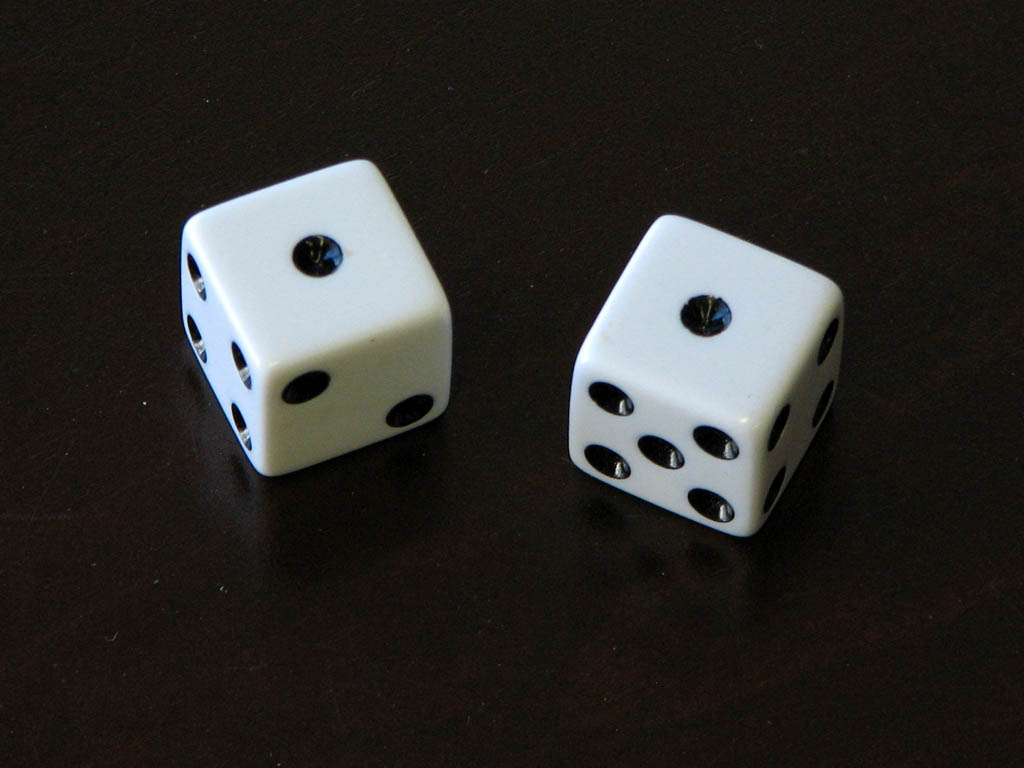
- In hazard, a roll of 2 is a loss
- Players: 2+
- Setup time: < 1 minute
- Chance: High, dice rolling

Hazard is an early English game played with two dice. It was mentioned in Geoffrey Chaucer's Canterbury Tales in the 14th century. Despite its complicated rules, hazard was very popular in the 17th and 18th centuries and was often played for money. Hazard was especially popular at Crockford's Club in London. In the 19th century, the game craps developed from hazard through a simplification of the rules. Craps is now popular in North America but neither game remains popular within the rest of the world.

== Rules ==
Any number may play, but only one player – the caster – has the dice at any time.

In each round, the caster specifies a number between 5 and 9 inclusive: this is the main. They then throw two dice.

Outcomes
Roll Main	2	3	4	5	6	7	8	9	10	11	12
5	o	o	C	N	C	C	C	C	C	o	o
6	o	o	C	C	N	C	C	C	C	o	N
7	o	o	C	C	C	N	C	C	C	N	o
8	o	o	C	C	C	C	N	C	C	o	N
9	o	o	C	C	C	C	C	N	C	o	o
Notes: o = throwing out or outing; C = chance; N = throwing in or nicking

- If they roll the main, they win (throwing in or nicking).
- If they roll a 2 or a 3, they lose (throwing out or outing).
- If they roll an 11 or 12, the result depends on the main:
  - with a main of 5 or 9, they throw out with both an 11 and a 12;
  - with a main of 6 or 8, they throw out with an 11 but nick with a 12;
  - with a main of 7, they nick with an 11 but throw out with a 12.
- If they neither nick nor throw out, the number thrown is called the chance. They throw the dice again:
  - if they roll the chance, they win;
  - if they roll the main, they lose (unlike on the first throw);
  - if they roll neither, they keep throwing until they roll one or the other, winning with the chance and losing with the main.

The caster keeps their role until losing three times in succession. After the third loss, they must pass the dice to the left, that player becoming the new caster.

== Betting ==
Bets are between the caster and the bank (the setter), which may be the remaining players acting as a group.

If the caster nicks on the first throw, they win an amount equal to their stake. After the first throw, the caster wins their stake if they get their chance before their main.

After the first throw, the caster (and others, via side bets) may wager an additional sum that the chance will come before the main. These bets are made at odds determined by the relative proportions of the main and the chance.

Probabilities of specific combinations with two dice

Relative odds for auxiliary bets
Chance Main	4	5	6	7	8	9	10
5	4/3	—	4/5	2/3	4/5	1/1	4/3
6	5/3	5/4	—	5/6	1/1	5/4	5/3
7	2/1	3/2	6/5	—	6/5	3/2	2/1
8	5/3	5/4	1/1	5/6	—	5/4	5/3
9	4/3	1/1	4/5	2/3	4/5	—	4/3

For example, there are six possible rolls (out of 36 total combinations with two dice) that add up to 7: one and six, two and five, three and four, four and three, five and two, and six and one; in comparison, there are only four possible rolls that add up to 5: one and four, two and three, three and two, and four and one. The relative proportion of the probabilities with a main of 7 and a chance of 5 is main/chance which is 6/4 or, simplified, 3/2. Assuming an odds stake of £10, a caster stands to win £15 (3/2 × £10) with a main of 7 and a chance of 5; with the same stake, a main of 5 and a chance of 6, they could win £8 (4/5 × £10).

== Probability of winning ==
For each main the probability of winning can be calculated:

Main	Probability of winning	Disadvantage to caster
5	0.492	1.52%
6	0.488	2.34%
7	0.493	1.41%
8	0.488	2.34%
9	0.492	1.52%

In some reports on the rules of the game, the main is determined randomly by tossing the dice until a valid main appears. In this case, the overall player disadvantage is 1.84%.

If the caster can choose a main, they should always choose 7 (resulting in the lowest disadvantage, with 1.41%). This is the origin of a similar dice game, craps, since if 7 is always chosen, the game is played under the rules of craps.

== Etymology and history ==
The name hazard is borrowed from Old French. The origin of the French word is unclear, but probably derives from Spanish azar ("an unfortunate card or dice roll"), with the final -d by analogy with the common French suffix -ard. The Spanish word has been supposed in turn to come from Arabic, either from the name of a castle in Palestine, or from the word az-zahr (الزهر) meaning "dice". However, early evidence for this word in Arabic is lacking, as it is absent from Classical Arabic dictionaries, making the etymology doubtful (although any other source is unknown). Another possibility is Arabic yasara ("he played at dice").

According to William of Tyre, the game was invented by Crusaders during the siege of Hazart (Azaz), but this origin has been called into question. The game was popular in 17th century England, as described by Charles Cotton in The Compleat Gamester (1674): "Certainly Hazzard is the most bewitching Game that is plaid on the Dice; for when a man begins to play he knows not when to leave off; and having once accustom'd himself to play at Hazzard he hardly ever after minds anything else." By that time, the game had already been brought to the Colony of Virginia, as a law barring ministers from playing dice was passed in 1624. The rules including relative odds for side wagers were largely complete by 1790, as published in Hoyle's Games, Improved.

It was brought to France some time before 1792, when it was described in the Encyclopédie Méthodique as Krabs, after the English term crabs, referring to the roll combination of 2 or 3. This was corrupted to craps by 1818, as it was named in Bibliothèque Historique, although the rules of that game described at that time were identical to those of hazard.

== Derivations from hazard ==
From the game of hazard came the modern terms:

- Possibly, the phrase "at sixes and sevens" (another possible derivation is discussed under that article). "Set upon six and seven" first appeared in Chaucer's Tales relating to betting one's entire fortune on a single throw of the dice. Over time the phrase became associated with any circumstances involving general confusion or disorder.
- The word hazard in its modern sense of "risk" or "danger".
- "An eye for (on / to) the main chance": habitually looking for opportunities to take advantage of a situation for personal gain, especially financial gain.
