= Taylen Kinney =

American basketball player (born 2008)

No. 0 – Kansas Jayhawks
- Position: Point guard
- Conference: Big 12 Conference

Personal information
- Born: January 19, 2008 (age 18)
- Listed height: 6 ft 2 in (1.88 m)
- Listed weight: 185 lb (84 kg)

Career information
- High school: Newport (Newport, Kentucky)
- College: Kansas (2026–present)

Career highlights
- McDonald's All-American (2026)
Medals
Men's basketball
Representing United States
FIBA Under-18 AmeriCup
Silver medal – second place	2026 Mexico	Team

Taylen Kinney (born January 19, 2008), nicknamed "TK", is an American college basketball player for the Kansas Jayhawks of the Big 12 Conference. He played for Rod Wave Elite of the Overtime Elite basketball league.

== Early career ==
Kinney attended Southgate Public School for middle school, where he first started playing basketball for the Southgate Lions.

=== High school career ===
Kinney attended and played for Newport High School in Newport, Kentucky. He spent three varsity seasons with the school before transferring. He averaged 17.5 points in the 23–24 season, 17.2 in the 22–23 season, and 11.5 in the 21–22 season. Kinney totaled 1,220 points over those three campaigns. Kinney was an all-state performer for the Wildcats and led the school to appearances in the Sweet 16 state tournament in 2023 and 2024. Newport also won the small-school All “A” Classic state championship in 2024 with Kinney.

Kinney played for Newport until April 2024, when he announced that he was committed to play on Overtime Elite for the rest of his high school career.

=== Overtime Elite (RWE) ===
Kinney played in Overtime Elite with Rod Wave Elite (RWE). In 20 regular-season OTE games in the 24–25 season, Kinney averaged 20.1 points, 5.0 assists, 4.0 rebounds, and 2.3 steals.

=== Kansas Jayhawks ===
He committed to the Kansas Jayhawks on September 28, 2025. At the time, Kinney was the first ranked point guard in the class of 2026, and the 13th overall ranked player within the class. He finished ranked 19th by 247Sports, 20th by ESPN, and 25th by Rivals (the lone four-star grade).

== Personal life ==
His grandfather owns River Front Pizza in Covington, Kentucky. Outside of basketball, Kinney is known for popularizing the “6-7 meme”, which led to the creation of his own canned water brand on June 7, 2025, dubbed "67 Water".
