= BLP Kosher =

American rapper (born 2000)

- Born: Benjamin Landy Pavlon; May 3, 2000 (age 26); Boca Raton, Florida, U.S.
- Origin: Deerfield Beach, Florida, U.S.
- Genres: Southern hip-hop; trap; hardcore hip hop; alternative hip-hop; rap rock
- Occupations: Rapper; singer; songwriter; skateboarder
- Years active: 2021–present
- Label: Encore
- Website: blpkosher.com

Benjamin Shimon Landy Pavlon (born May 3, 2000), known professionally as BLP Kosher (stylized in all caps), is an American rapper, singer-songwriter, and skateboarder.

He began his recording career in 2021 on SoundCloud. He is Jewish and is known for embracing his heritage and faith in his music and public image. His eponymous mixtape (2022) and its follow-up, the Magic Dreidel (2022), included the singles "Jew on the Canoe" and "The Nac".

His 2023 single "Mazel Tron" (with BabyTron) was accompanied by a music video directed by Cole Bennett of Lyrical Lemonade. Later that year, he released his debut studio album, Bars Mitzvah, which was supported by the single "Special K."

== Early life and education ==
Pavlon was born on May 3, 2000, in Boca Raton, Florida. Before his musical career, Pavlon was a semiprofessional skateboarder with sponsors such as Habitat Skateboards, HUF Footwear, Mad Skate Shop, and Nili Widerker. He started skating at the age of 7, and has multiple videos on the Vice Skateboarding Channel, in which he showcases his skateboarding.

== Career ==
Pavlon started rapping in early 2021. His friend Jew Sheisty, a fellow Jewish rapper, became his mentor, pushing him to keep rapping after they posted a song on SoundCloud together. Jew Sheisty also created Pavlon's stage name; although originally going by "Luh Kosher," Jew Shiesty inspired Pavlon to add his initials to his stage name, resulting in "BLP Kosher."

Pavlon's first major hit was "Mazel Tron" featuring fellow rapper BabyTron. The song and music video were recorded in the span of two days, and accrued over a million views within a week.

== Artistry ==
Pavlon is known for wordplay, with multiple double entendres per song. His childhood consisting of skateboarding shows in his songs as well, with common references to certain skate tricks such as the NAC (Not a Chance) attempted by Paul Rodriguez in the film Street Dreams, Yoshi Tanenbaum, Rob Dyrdek, Tommy Guerrero, and dozens more. He even references BMX with bars about Dave Mirra.

Pavlon has also heavily embraced his Jewish heritage in a similar manner to his mentor, Jew Sheisty. His Jewish heritage is on display via song titles such as "Nightmare on Shabbat" and "Hanukkahween", as well as in the lyrics of most of his songs. Pavlon regularly practices Shabbat, as well as abstaining from drinking and drugs, citing previous addictions to marijuana.

== Discography ==
=== Studio albums ===
List of studio albums, with selected details
Title	Studio album details
Bars Mitzvah	Released: August 4, 2023; Label: Dreidel Gang, Encore Recordings; Format: CD, digital download, streaming
Scarecrow	Released: July 12, 2024; Label: Dreidel Gang, Encore Recordings; Format: Digital download, streaming
Brackish	Released: June 27, 2025; Label: Dreidel Gang; Format: Digital download, streaming
Grip Thumb 2 Paper Cuts	Released: October 2, 2026; Label: Dreidel Gang; Format: Digital download, streaming

=== Mixtapes ===
List of mixtapes, with selected details
Title	Mixtape details
Earth To Benjamin	Released: April 6, 2021; Label: Self-released; Format: Digital download, streaming
Angelfish	Released: May 27, 2021; Label: Self-released; Format: Digital download, streaming
BLP Kosher and the Magic Dreidel	Released: November 5, 2022; Label: Self-released; Format: CD, digital download, streaming

=== Extended plays ===
List of EPs, with selected details
Title	EP details
225 Bars	Released: June 28, 2021; Label: Self-released; Format: Digital download, streaming

=== Charted singles ===
Title	Year	Peak chart positions	Album
Title	Year	NZ Hot	Album
"Violent Lullaby" (with Yung Lean)	2023	37	Non-album single
