= BabyChiefDoit =

American rapper (born c. 2008)

- Jones in 2026

Background information
- Born: Jayden Whitter Jones c. 2008 (age 17–18)
- Origin: South Side, Chicago, Illinois, US
- Genre: Drill
- Occupations: Rapper; songwriter
- Label: Artist Partner Group

Jayden Whitter Jones (born c. 2008), known professionally as BabyChiefDoit, is an American rapper from South Side, Chicago, Illinois. He is best known for singles "Went West" in 2025, and "Ghetto Love Story" in 2026, both of which entered the Billboard Hot 100.

== Career ==
Jones gained growth with his songs "Pancakes & Drugs" and "6ix Times 2Day", both of which released in 2024. His single "Rollin" entered the TikTok Billboard Top 50. He was also selected as a 2025 XXL Freshman. His debut studio album, Animals Only (2024), was met with positive reviews from critics, along with his second album, Zoo Life (2025). Jones performed at Rolling Loud 2025, as well as the Lyrical Lemonade Summer Smash.

== Musical style ==
Jones is a drill rapper who has been compared to Chief Keef and Waka Flocka Flame. In a 2025 interview, he stated that he had used ChatGPT to write lyrics, which he was criticized for.

== Discography ==
=== Studio albums ===
Title	Album details
Zoo Life	Released: April 23, 2025; Label: APG; Format: LP, digital download, streaming
Rise Against My Broken Odds	Released: June 12, 2026; Label: APG; Format: LP, digital download, streaming

=== Mixtapes ===
Title	Mixtape details
Animals Only	Released: October 3, 2024; Label: APG; Format: Digital download, streaming

=== Extended plays ===
Title	EP details
Warning Shot	Released: October 24, 2025; Label: APG; Format: Digital download, streaming

=== Charted and certified singles ===
Title	Year	Peak chart positions			Certifications	Album
Title	Year	US	US R&B/HH	NZ Hot	Certifications	Album
"The Viper"	2024	—	—	—	RIAA: Gold	Animals Only
"Went West"	2025	71	21	—	RIAA: Gold	Rise Against My Broken Odds
"Ghetto Love Story"	2026	44	11	25		Rise Against My Broken Odds
