= Charley =

Charley may refer to:

== Places ==
- Charley, Leicestershire, a parish in England
- Charley's Flat, alternate name for Dutch Flat, California
- Charley's Motel, former name of Star Lite Motel, Minnesota, United States
- Charley Ridge, West Virginia, United States
- Charley's Trace, trail to the Mississippi River
- Charley's Automotive Service, National Register of Historic Places listing in New Mexico, United States

== Rivers, streams & creeks ==
- Charley River, river in Alaska
  - Yukon–Charley Rivers National Preserve, national preserve containing the Charley River basin
- Charley Creek (Clallam River), Washington State, United States
- Charley Creek (Asotin Creek), Washington State, United States
- Dutch Charley Creek, Minnesota, United States
- Lake Charley, Lake in Minnesota, United States

== People ==
- Charley (name)
- Charley Yang (singer, known as chandol and formerly BoyWithUke)

== Other ==
- Charleys Philly Steaks, American restaurant chain
- List of storms named Charley, the name of several tropical cyclones in the Atlantic Basin
- Charley horse, a biophysical condition

== See also ==
- Cascade Charley, fountain and sculpture in Oregon, United States by Alice Wingwall
- Charley ATL, Azerbaijani band
- Goodtime Charley, musical that earned 7 Tony Award nominations
- Charles
- Charlie (disambiguation)
- Charly (disambiguation)
- Chuck (disambiguation)
- Charlotte
