= Charlie =

Charlie may refer to:

== Animal ==
- Charlie (elephant) (died 1923), circus and movies
- Charlie (parrot) (born 1899), a pet possibly owned by Winston Churchill
- Charlie (goat), an animal actor in horror film The Witch

== Film and television ==
- Charlie (2007 film), an American film
- Charlie (2015 Malayalam film), an Indian Malayalam-language film:
  - Charlie (2015 soundtrack), by Gopi Sundar for the 2015 Malayalam film
- Charlie (2015 Kannada film), an Indian Kannada-language film
- Charlie (TV series), a 2015 political drama series based on the life of Charles J. Haughey
- "Charlie" (The Mighty Boosh), a 2004 television episode
- "Charlie" (Not Going Out), a 2017 television episode
- TV 2 Charlie, a Danish television channel

== Military ==
- Charlie-class submarine, of the Soviet Navy
- "Charlie", the letter "C" in the NATO phonetic alphabet
  - "Charlie", American military slang referring to the communist forces in the Vietnam War, from "Victor Charlie" for Viet Cong

== Music ==
- Charlie (band), a British rock band in the 1970s and 1980s
- Charlie (Charlie Puth album), a 2022 album by Charlie Puth
- Charlie (Melt-Banana album), a 1998 album by the band Melt-Banana
- "Charlie" (Mallrat song), 2019
- "Charlie" (Tom MacDonald song), 2025
- "Charlie" (Tones and I song), 2022
- "Charlie", a song by Alice Ivy on the album I'm Dreaming, 2018
- "Charlie", a song by Carrie Lucas from Horsin' Around, 1984
- "Charlie", a song by Chumbawamba from The Boy Bands Have Won, 2008
- "Charlie", a song by Lana Scolaro, 2020
- "Charlie", a song by Miranda Cosgrove from Sparks Fly, 2010
- "Charlie", a song by Red Hot Chili Peppers from Stadium Arcadium, 2006
- "Charlie 'n Charlie", a song by Slapp Happy from Acnalbasac Noom, 1980

== People ==
- Charle (born 1960), Indian actor, also known as Charlie
- Charlie (given name); includes a list of people and fictional characters with the name
- Charlie (Hungarian singer) (born 1947), Hungarian rock and soul singer born Károly Horváth in 1947
- Charlie (skeleton), a Neolithic skeleton discovered in England
- Charlie Chop-off, the pseudonym given to an unidentified American serial killer
- Noor Mohammed Charlie or Charlie (1911–1983), comedian in Indian films

== Places ==
- Charlie, Texas, an unincorporated community in Clay County
- Charlie Creek (Florida), a stream
- Checkpoint Charlie, famous Berlin Wall crossing point

== Other uses ==
- 777 Charlie, a 2022 Indian Kannada-language film
- Charles Brownlow Medal of the Australian Football League, nicknamed "Charlie"
- Charles S. Roberts Award, nicknamed Charlie, an award in war gaming
- Charlie (fragrance), a line of women's and men's fragrances
- Charlie's, a New Zealand-based beverage producer
- Charlie's (Australians in Film), a creative co-working space at Australians in Film in West Hollywood
- Charlie Hebdo (Charlie Weekly), a French satirical weekly newspaper, sometimes shortened to Charlie
- Charlie Mensuel (Charlie Monthly), a French monthly comics magazine
- Cocaine, a drug sometimes referred to by the street name "Charlie"
- La Trobe University, nicknamed "Old Charlie"

== See also ==
- Charles (disambiguation)
- Charley (disambiguation)
- Charli (disambiguation)
- Charline (disambiguation)
- Charly (disambiguation)
- Chuck (disambiguation)
