= Charmin (disambiguation) =

Charmin is an American brand of toilet paper.

Charmin may also refer to:

- Charmin Lee (born 1967), American actress; see Parenthood (film)
- Charmin Smith (born 1975), American basketball coach

== See also ==
- Charmian (disambiguation)
- Charming (disambiguation)
- Charmi (disambiguation)
