= Charming =

Charming may refer to:

== Fiction ==
- Charming (film), a 2019 animated musical comedy film
- Charming (TV series), a 2005 Japanese television series, a.k.a. Aikurushii
- Charming, a fictional town where the television series Sons of Anarchy is set
- Prince Charming (disambiguation), a stock fairy tale character
- The Charmings, an American fantasy sitcom (1987-1988)
- "Charming", a song from the musical Natasha, Pierre & the Great Comet of 1812
- Charming, a Yokai tribe in the Yokai Watch franchise

== Other uses ==
- Charming (constituency), a constituency in Yau Tsim Mong District, Hong Kong

== See also ==
- Charm (disambiguation)
- Charmy (disambiguation)
- Charmi (disambiguation)
- Charmed (disambiguation)
- Charmer (disambiguation)
