= Charm =

Charm or Charms may refer to:

== Arts and entertainment ==
- Charms, a Greek garage pop band
- The Charms, an American garage rock band
- Otis Williams and the Charms, an American doo-wop group
- The Charm (T. S. Monk album), 1995
- The Charm (Bubba Sparxxx album), 2006
- Charm (Danny! album), 2006
- Charm (Clairo album), 2024
- "Charm" (Rema song), 2023
- "Charm", a song by Wild Colonials from the 1996 album This Can't Be Life
- "Charm", a song by Tony Banks from the 1983 album The Fugitive
- "Charm", a 1981 song by Positive Noise
- "Charm", a 1986 song by Virginia Astley
- "Charms" (Bobby Vee song), 1963
- "Charms" (The Philosopher Kings song), 1995
- Charm (TV series), a Burmese TV series

== Magic and superstition ==
- Charm, or incantation, a magical formula intended to trigger a magical effect
- Charm, a lucky symbol
- Charm, a jewelled ornament on a charm bracelet

== Science and technology ==
=== Quantum physics ===
- Charm quark, an elementary particle
- Charm (quantum number), the difference between the number of charm quarks and charm antiquarks in a particle

=== Computing ===
- Charm (programming language), devised in the 1990s
- Charm++, a parallel programming language based on C++
- Charms, part of the Windows shell user interface

=== Devices ===
- BlackBerry Charm, a smartphone
- Motorola Charm, a smartphone

== People ==
- Daniel Charms, a pseudonym of Russian poet, writer and dramatist Daniil Kharms (1905–1942)
- Charm Chiteule (1953–2008), Zambian boxer
- Charm La'Donna (born 1988), American dancer
- Charm Tong (born 1981), Burmese teacher and human rights activist

== Other uses ==
- Charm, Ohio, an unincorporated community in the US
- Baltimore Charm, an American women's football team
- Miss Charm, an annual beauty pageant
- Royal Ordnance L30, conceive by the Challenger armament (CHARM) project
- An animal collective name for finches
- Charm (finance), a second-order derivative in mathematical finance
- Charms Candy Company, manufacturer of Charms candy
- Charms, a brand of cigarette manufactured by VST Industries

== See also ==
- Charisma, a personal quality of magnetic charm, persuasion, or appeal
- Charmed (disambiguation)
- Charmer (disambiguation)
- Charmi (disambiguation)
- Charming (disambiguation)
- Charmstone, a stone or mineral artifact associated with traditional cultures
- CHARMM (Chemistry at Harvard Macromolecular Mechanics), a set of force fields for molecular dynamics
- Charmy (disambiguation)
- Lucky charm (disambiguation)
- Superficial charm, the social act of saying or doing things because they are well received by others
- Unicharm, a Japanese manufacturer
