= Tintinnabulum (ancient Rome) =

Wind chime

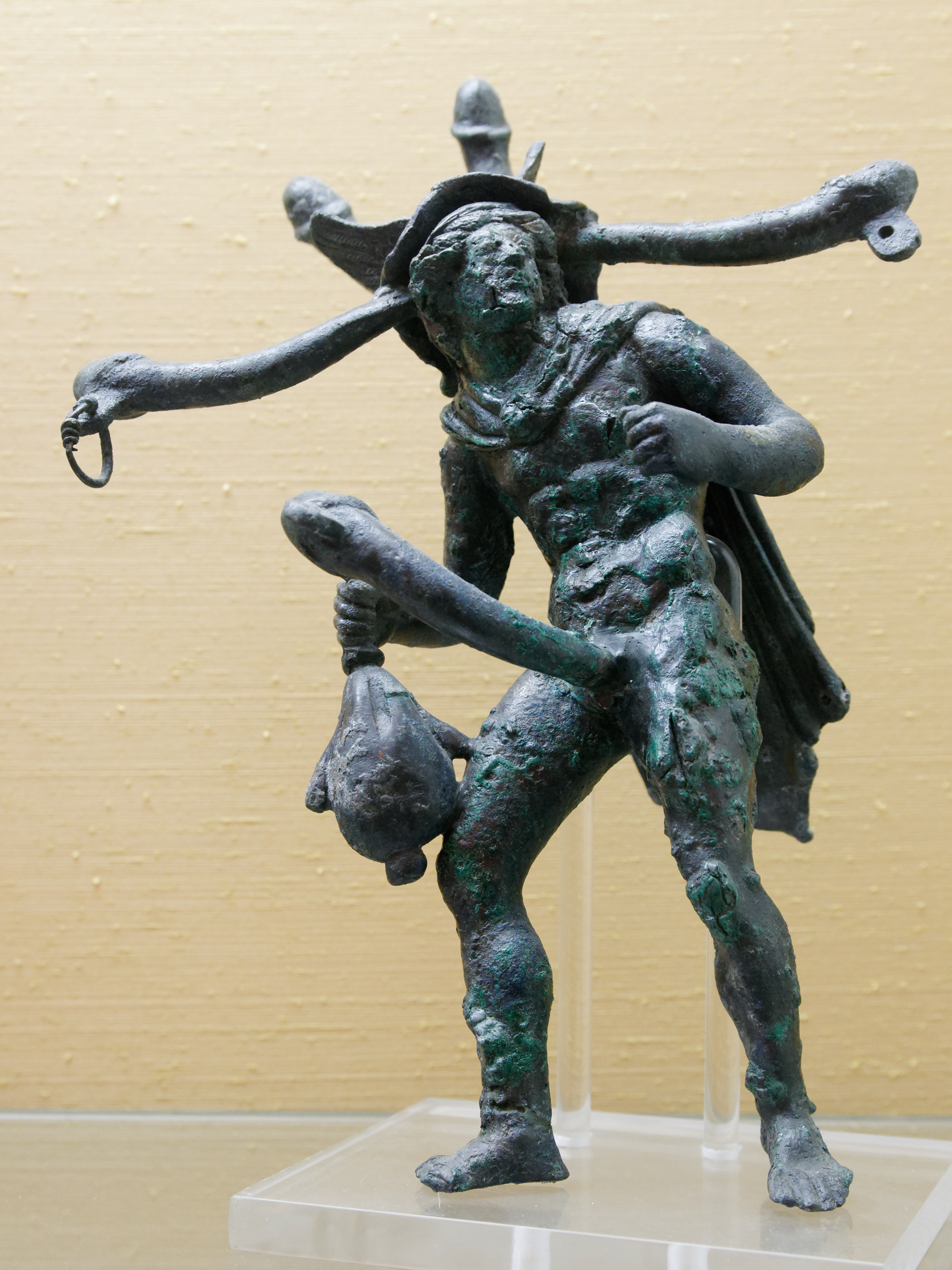
A bronze polyphallic tintinnabulum of Mercury from Pompeii: the missing bells were attached to each tip (Naples Museum).

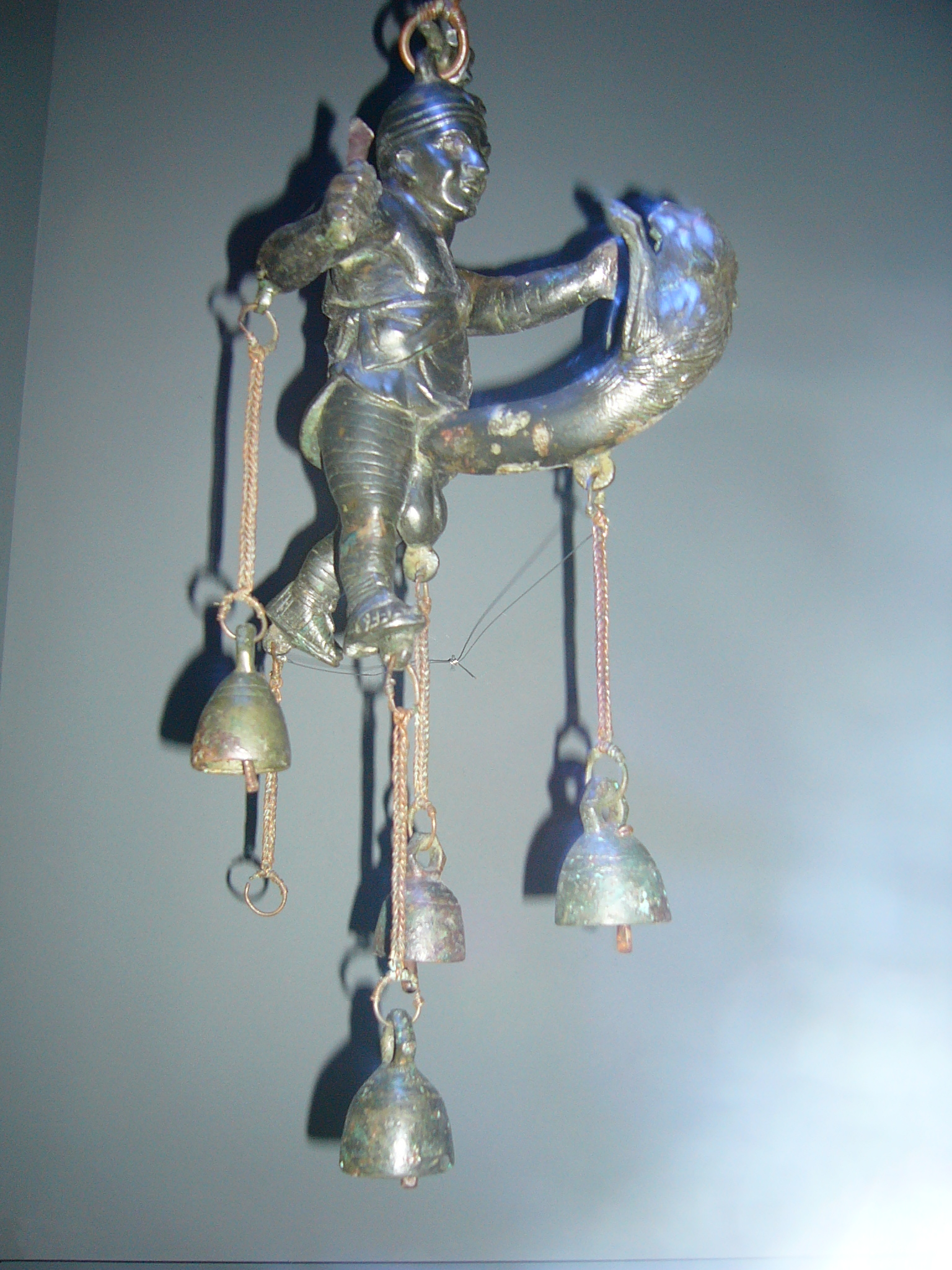
Tintinnabulum depicting a man struggling with his phallus as a raging beast (1st century BC, Naples Museum)

In ancient Rome, a tintinnabulum (less often tintinnum) was a wind chime or assemblage of bells. A tintinnabulum often took the form of a bronze ithyphallic figure or of a fascinum, a magico-religious phallus thought to ward off the evil eye and bring good fortune and prosperity.

A tintinnabulum acted as a door amulet. These were hung near thresholds at a shop or house, under the peristyles (around the inner courtyard or garden) by the bedroom, or the venereum, where the wind would cause them to tinkle. They were also made to ring like doorbells, a series of them being tied to cord attached to a bell pull.

The sounds of bells were believed to keep away evil spirits; compare the apotropaic role of the bell in the "bell, book, and candle" ritual of the earlier Catholic Church. It has also been surmised that oscilla hung on hooks along colonnaded porticoes may have comparable evil-warding intents.

Hand-bells have been found in sanctuaries and other settings that indicate their religious usage, and were used at the Temple of Iuppiter Tonans, "Jupiter the Thunderer." Elaborately decorated pendants for tintinnabula occur in Etruscan settings, depicting for example women carding wool, spinning, and weaving. Bells were hung on the necks of domestic animals such as horses and sheep to keep track of the animals, but perhaps also for apotropaic purposes.

A number of examples are part of the Secret Museum collection at the Museo Archeologico Nazionale di Napoli.

== See also ==
- Erotic art in Pompeii and Herculaneum
- Lucky charm (disambiguation)
- Mutunus Tutunus
- Priapus
- Sexuality in ancient Rome
