= Charly =

Charly may refer to:

== People ==
- Charly (name)

== Places ==
- Charly-sur-Marne, in the Aisne department
- Charly, Cher, in the Cher department
- Charly, Metropolis of Lyon, in the Metropolis of Lyon
- Charly-Oradour, in the Moselle department

== Other ==
- Operation Charly, a program countering left-wing activities in Central America
- Charly (brand), a Mexican sportswear company
- Charly, 1968 film adaptation of short story and novel Flowers for Algernon by Daniel Keyes
- Charly, 1980 novel by Jack Weyland that was adapted into a 2002 movie with the same name
- "Charly", a song by The Prodigy

== See also ==
- Charlie (disambiguation)
- Charley (disambiguation)
- Charmy (disambiguation)
