= Barber surgeon of Avebury =

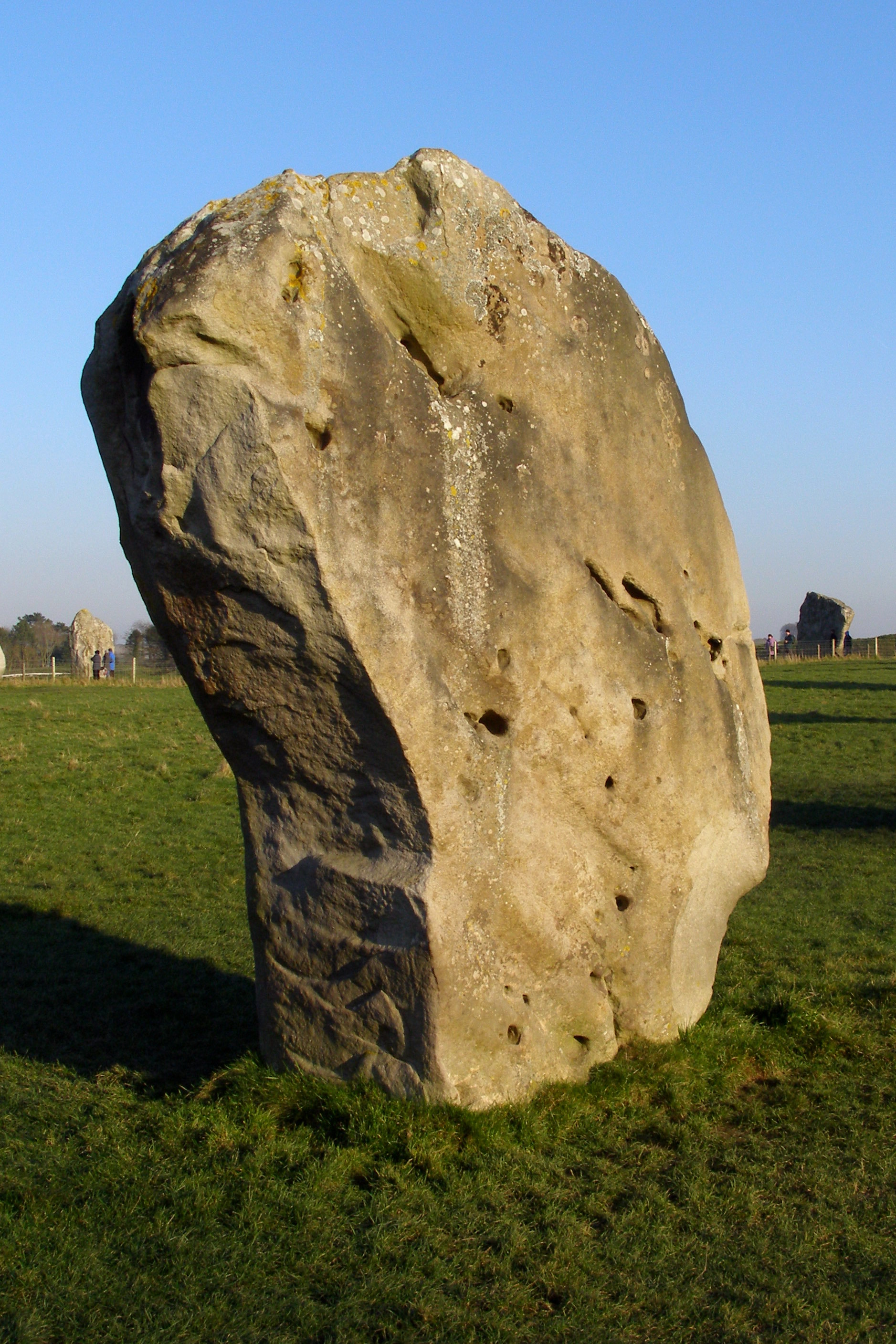
The re-erected Barber Stone

The barber surgeon of Avebury is a skeleton discovered in 1938 at Avebury henge monument in Wiltshire, England.

The body was found underneath a buried megalith by archaeologist Alexander Keiller in 1938. It was dated by coins to the early 14th century, and identified as a barber surgeon by a pair of scissors and a medical-looking probe. The stone was re-erected by Keiller. Keiller assigned the stone as Stone 38, with Isobel Smith renumbering as Stone 9. Many stones of the Avebury stone circle had been buried, presumably as a result of attempts to de-paganise the site or to clear land for agriculture.

The story of the barber surgeon is one that most visitors to the prehistoric Avebury stone circle will have heard. The traditional interpretation goes as follows; a pious traveller was assisting the folk of Avebury village in burying the pagan standing stones during the 14th century. As he was digging out the underside of a stone it fell over, crushing him and entombing him beneath it. Keiller lifted the stone (which was 3 metres tall and weighed 13 tons) to reinstate it in 1938 and found the man's remains underneath. Items found with the body including three silver coins dated to around 1320–25, as well as a pair of iron scissors and an iron probe led to him being identified as an itinerant mediaeval barber surgeon.

Keiller sent the remains to the curator of the museum at the Royal College of Surgeons, who he felt would appreciate the find. It was thought to have been destroyed during bombing in the Second World War but was rediscovered in a store at the Natural History Museum by Mike Pitts, the former curator of the Alexander Keiller Museum, Avebury, and re-examined in 1998. A large healed cut wound was noticed on the skull but no evidence of traumatic death was identified and it was suggested that the man had been buried beneath a stone rather than crushed by it.

== See also ==
- Children of the Stones
