= Charmi (disambiguation) =

Charmy Kaur (born 1987), also known as Charmi and Charmme, is an Indian actress.

Charmi may also refer to:

- Shahin Charmi (born 1953) is an Iranian-born German artist
- Charmi, Mazandaran, Iran
- Charmi, Razavi Khorasan, Iran

== See also ==
- Charmy (disambiguation)
- Charm (disambiguation)
- Charming (disambiguation)
- Charmin (disambiguation)
