= Avebury =

Neolithic henge monument in Wiltshire, England

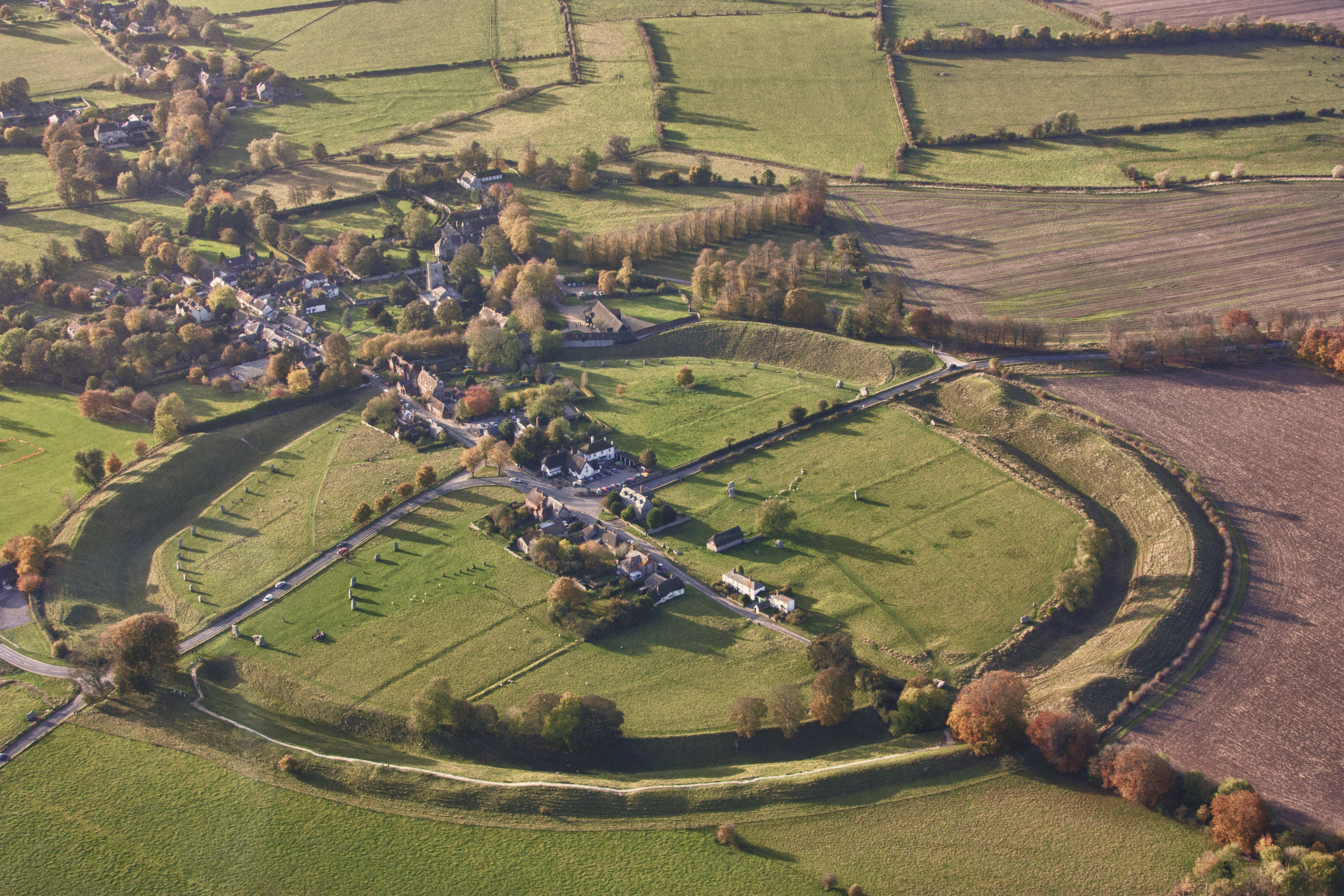
- Avebury henge, stone circle and village overview

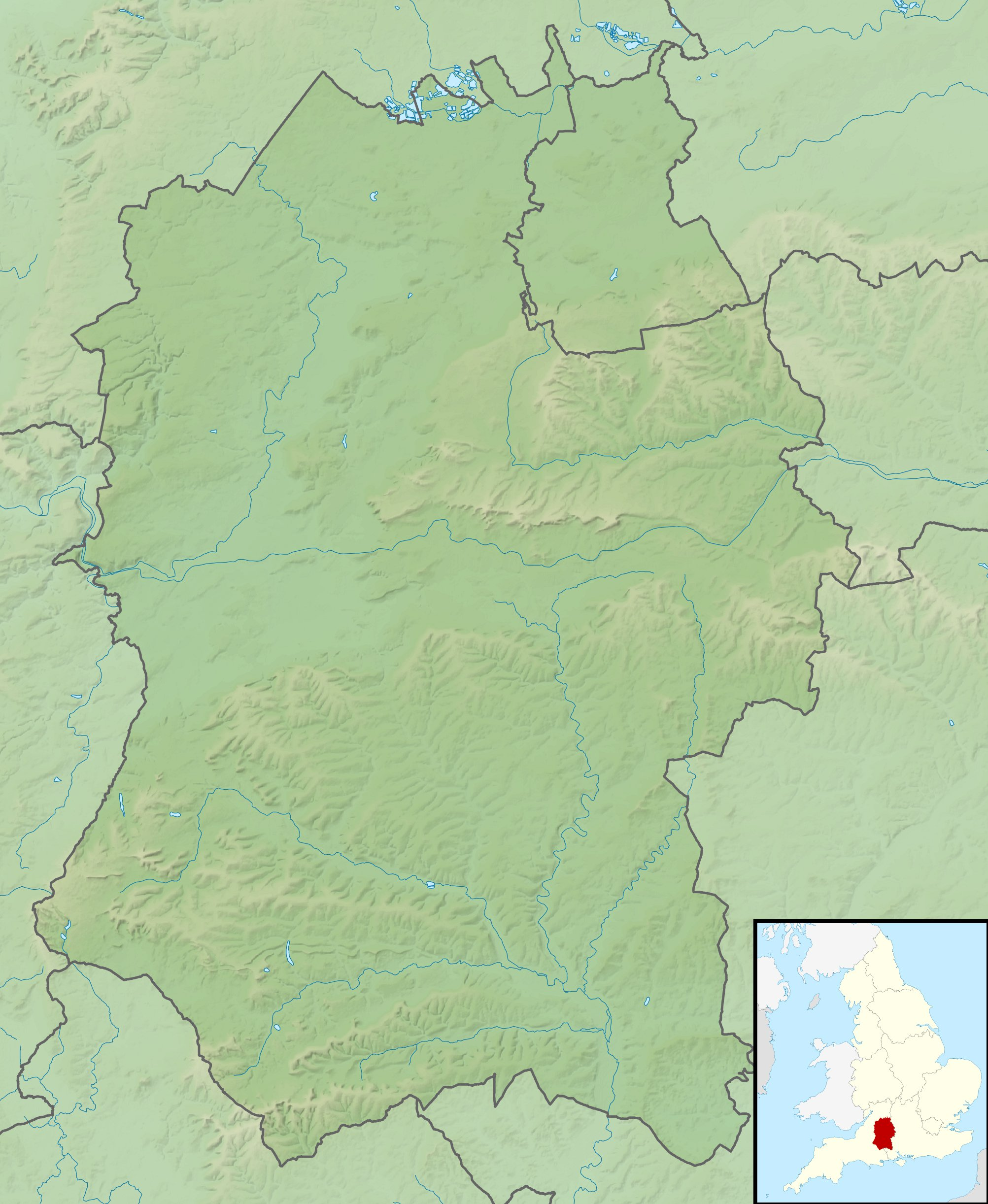
- Map of Wiltshire showing the location of Avebury
- 51°25′43″N 1°51′15″W
- Type: Monument
- Location: Wiltshire, England

History
- Built: Neolithic

Site notes
- Material: Sarsen
- Excavation dates: 1719-1724, 1894, 1908, 1909, 1911, 1914, 1922, 1934-1935, 1937-1939
- Archaeologists: William Stukeley, Henry Bruce Meux, Harold St George Gray, Alexander Keiller
- Owner: National Trust
- Management: National Trust
- Website: www.nationaltrust.org.uk/avebury

UNESCO World Heritage Site
- Type: Cultural
- Criteria: i, ii, iii
- Designated: 1986 (10th session)
- Part of: Stonehenge, Avebury and Associated Sites
- Reference no.: 373
- Region: Europe and North America

Avebury (/ˈeɪvbəri/) is a Neolithic henge monument containing three stone circles, around the village of Avebury in Wiltshire, in south-west England. One of the best-known prehistoric sites in Britain, it contains the largest megalithic stone circle in the world. It is both a tourist attraction and a place of religious importance to contemporary pagans.

Constructed over several hundred years in the third millennium BC, during the Neolithic, or New Stone Age, the monument comprises a large henge (a bank and a ditch) with a large outer stone circle and two separate smaller stone circles situated inside the centre of the monument. Its original purpose is unknown, although archaeologists believe that it might have been used for some form of ritual or ceremony. The Avebury monument is a part of a larger prehistoric landscape containing several older monuments nearby, including West Kennet Long Barrow, Windmill Hill and Silbury Hill.

By the Iron Age, the site had been effectively abandoned, with some evidence of human activity on the site during the Roman period. During the Early Middle Ages, a village first began to be built around the monument, eventually extending into it. In the late medieval and early modern periods, local people destroyed many of the standing stones around the henge, both for religious and practical reasons. The antiquarians John Aubrey and William Stukeley took an interest in Avebury during the 17th and 18th centuries, respectively, and recorded much of the site between various phases of destruction. Archaeological investigation followed in the 20th century, with Harold St George Gray leading an excavation of the bank and ditch, and Alexander Keiller overseeing a project to reconstruct much of the monument.

Avebury is managed by the National Trust. It has been designated a Scheduled Ancient Monument, as well as a World Heritage Site, in the latter capacity being seen as a part of the wider prehistoric landscape of Wiltshire known as Stonehenge, Avebury and Associated Sites. About 480 people live in 235 homes in the village of Avebury and its associated settlement of Avebury Trusloe, and in the nearby hamlets of Beckhampton and West Kennett.

== Location and environment ==
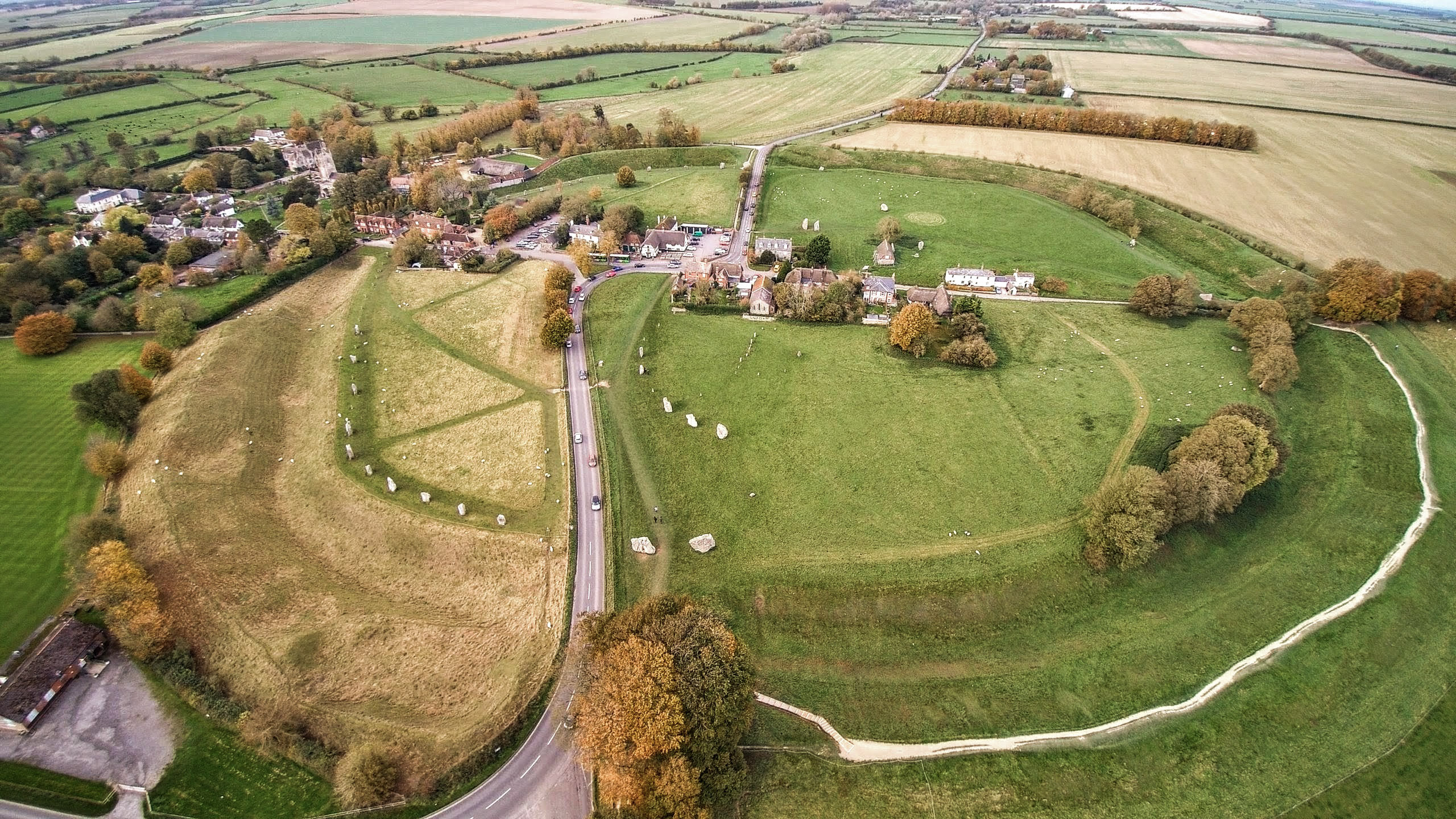
Aerial photo of the site and village in 2017

At grid reference SU10266996, Avebury is respectively about 6 and 7 miles (10 and 11 km) from the modern towns of Marlborough and Calne. The monuments at the Avebury World Heritage Site cover about 8 3/4 square miles (23 square kilometres). Avebury lies in an area of chalkland in the Upper Kennet Valley that forms the catchment for the River Kennet and supports local springs and seasonal watercourses. The monument stands slightly above the local landscape, sitting on a low chalk ridge 160 m (520 ft) above sea level; to the east are the Marlborough Downs, an area of lowland hills.

Boundary and key sites for the Avebury section of the Stonehenge and Avebury World Heritage Site

The site lies at the centre of a collection of Neolithic and early Bronze Age monuments and was inscribed as a World Heritage Site in a co-listing with the monuments at Stonehenge, 17 miles (27 km) to the south, in 1986. It is now listed as part of the Stonehenge, Avebury and Associated Sites World Heritage Site. The monuments are preserved as part of a Neolithic and Bronze Age landscape for the information they provide regarding prehistoric people's relationship with the landscape.

Radiocarbon dating and analysis of pollen and occasionally insects in buried soils have shown that the environment of lowland Britain changed around 4250–4000 BC. During the Neolithic period, argillic (clayey) brownearths reigned in the landscape formed by the acidifying conditions of a closed woodland, becoming more chalky as a result of clearance and anthropogenic (human-made) interference.

The area was originally a mix of deep argillic brownearths on clay-rich areas along with calcareous (chalky) brownearths that were "predisposed" to transforming into grassland. The change to a grassland environment from damp, heavy soils and expanses of dense forest was mostly brought about by farmers, probably through the use of slash and burn techniques. Environmental factors may also have made a contribution. The long grassland area formed a dense vegetational mat which eventually led to the decalcification of the soil profile. In the Mesolithic period, woodland was dominated by alder, lime, elm and oak. There is a major decline in pollen around 4500 BC, but an increase in grasses from 4500 BC to 3200 BC and the first occurrence of cereal pollen.

Pollen is poorly preserved in the chalky soils found around Avebury, so the best evidence for the state of local environment at any time in the past comes from the study of the deposition of snail shells. Different species of snail live in specific habitats, so the presence of a certain species indicates what the area was like at a particular time.

The available evidence suggests that in the early Neolithic, Avebury and the surrounding hills were covered in dense oak woodland, and as the Neolithic progressed, the woodland around Avebury and the nearby monuments receded and was replaced by grassland.

== Mesolithic and Neolithic history ==
The history of the site before the construction of the henge is uncertain, because little datable evidence has emerged from modern archaeological excavations. Evidence of activity in the region before the 4th millennium BC is limited, suggesting that there was little human occupation.

=== Mesolithic ===
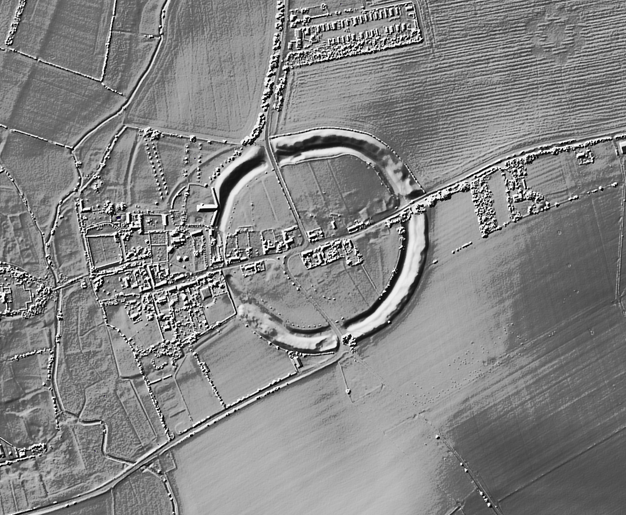
Aerial lidar topography shows the 347m-diameter circular bank and ditch surrounding the stones

What is now termed the Mesolithic period in Britain lasted from circa 11,600 to 7,800 BP, at a time when the island was heavily forested and when there was still a land mass, called Doggerland, which connected Britain to continental Europe. During this era, those humans living in Britain were hunter-gatherers, often moving around the landscape in small familial or tribal groups in search of food and other resources. Archaeologists have unearthed evidence that there were some of these hunter-gatherers active around Avebury during the Late Mesolithic, with stray finds of flint tools, dated between 7000 and 4000 BC, having been found in the area. The most important of these discoveries is a densely scattered collection of worked flints found 300 m (980 ft) to the west of Avebury, which has led archaeologists to believe that that spot was a flint working site occupied over a period of several weeks by a group of nomadic hunter-gatherers who had set up camp there.

The archaeologists Mark Gillings and Joshua Pollard suggested the possibility that Avebury first gained some sort of ceremonial significance during the Late Mesolithic period. As evidence, they highlighted the existence of a posthole near the monument's southern entrance that would have once supported a large wooden post. Although this posthole was never dated when it was excavated in the early 20th century, and so cannot definitely be ascribed to the Mesolithic, Gillings and Pollard noted that its positioning had no relation to the rest of the henge, and that it may therefore have been erected centuries or even millennia before the henge was actually built. They compared this with similar wooden posts that had been erected in southern Britain during the Mesolithic at Stonehenge and Hambledon Hill, both of which were sites that like Avebury saw the construction of large monuments in the Neolithic.

=== Early Neolithic ===
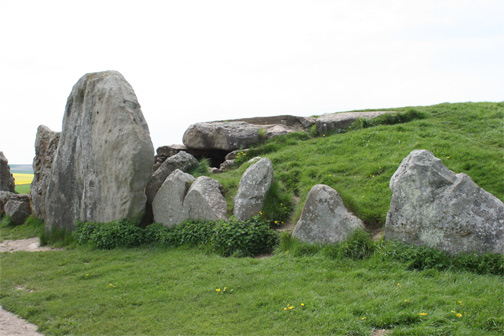
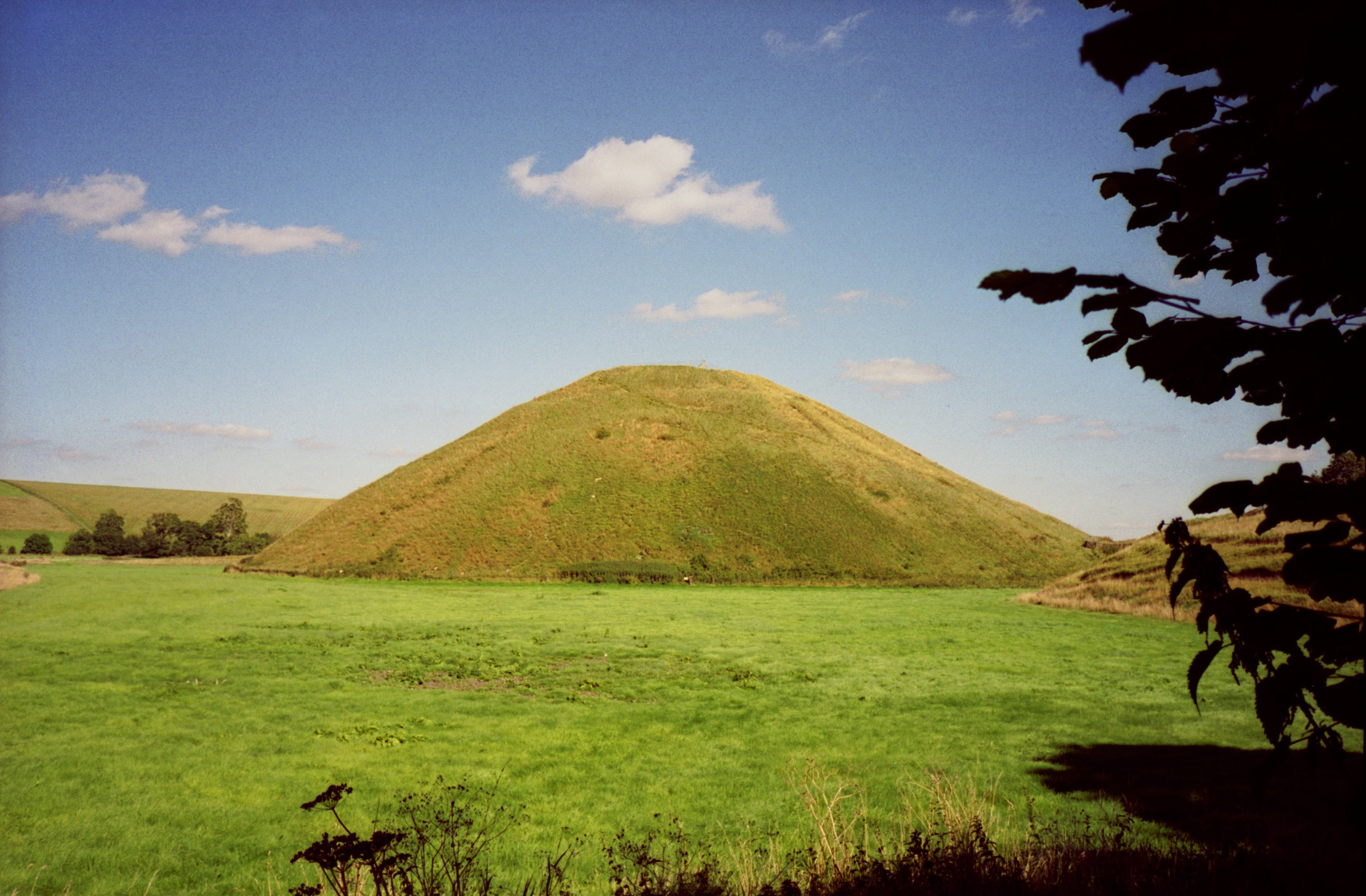
The two monuments of West Kennet Long Barrow and Silbury Hill were constructed in the vicinity of Avebury several centuries before the henge was built.

In the 4th millennium BC, around the start of the Neolithic period in Britain, British society underwent radical changes. These coincided with the introduction of domesticated species of animals and plants, as well as a changing material culture that included pottery. These developments allowed hunter-gatherers to settle down and produce their own food. As agriculture spread, people cleared land. At the same time, they also erected the first monuments to be seen in the local landscape, an activity interpreted as evidence of a change in the way people viewed their place in the world.

Based on anthropological studies of recent and contemporary societies, Gillings and Pollard suggest that forests, clearings, and stones were important in Neolithic culture, not only as resources but as symbols; the site of Avebury occupied a convergence of these three elements. Neolithic activity at Avebury is evidenced by flint, animal bones, and pottery such as Peterborough ware dating from the early 4th and 3rd millennia BC. Five distinct areas of Neolithic activity have been identified within 500 m (1,600 ft) of Avebury; they include a scatter of flints along the line of the West Kennet Avenue—an avenue that connects Avebury with the Neolithic site of The Sanctuary. Pollard suggests that areas of activity in the Neolithic became important markers in the landscape.

=== Late Neolithic ===
"After over a thousand years of early farming, a way of life based on ancestral tombs, forest clearance and settlement expansion came to an end. This was a time of important social changes."

— Archaeologist and prehistorian Mike Parker Pearson on the Late Neolithic in Britain (2005)

During the Late Neolithic, British society underwent another series of major changes. Between 3500 and 3300 BC, these prehistoric Britons ceased their continual expansion and cultivation of wilderness and instead focused on settling and farming the most agriculturally productive areas of the island: Orkney, eastern Scotland, Anglesey, the upper Thames, Wessex, Essex, Yorkshire and the river valleys of the Wash.

Late Neolithic Britons also appeared to have changed their religious beliefs, ceasing to construct the large chambered tombs that are widely thought by archaeologists to have been connected with ancestor veneration. Instead, they began the construction of large wooden or stone circles, with many hundreds being built across Britain and Ireland over a period of a thousand years.

== Construction ==
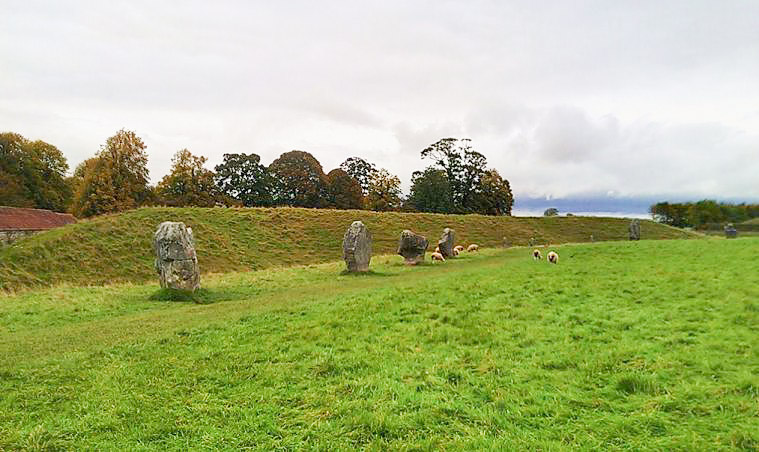
The north-west sector of Avebury

The chronology of Avebury's construction is unclear. It was not designed as a single monument, but is the result of various projects that were undertaken at different times during late prehistory. Aubrey Burl suggests dates of 3000 BC for the central cove, 2900 BC for the inner stone circle, 2600 BC for the outer circle and henge, and around 2400 BC for the avenues.

The construction of large monuments such as those at Avebury indicates that a stable agrarian economy had developed in Britain by around 4000–3500 BC. The people who built them had to be secure enough to spend time on such non-essential activities. Avebury was one of a group of monumental sites that were established in this region during the Neolithic. Its monuments comprise the henge and associated long barrows, stone circles, avenues and a causewayed enclosure. These monument types are not exclusive to the Avebury area. For example, Stonehenge features the same kinds of monuments, and in Dorset there is a henge on the edge of Dorchester and a causewayed enclosure at nearby Maiden Castle. According to archaeologist Caroline Malone, who worked for English Heritage as an inspector of monuments and was the curator of Avebury's Alexander Keiller Museum, it is possible that the monuments associated with Neolithic sites such as Avebury and Stonehenge constituted ritual or ceremonial centres.

Archaeologist Mike Parker Pearson noted that the addition of the stones to the henge occurred at a similar date to the construction of Silbury Hill and the major building projects at Stonehenge and Durrington Walls. For this reason, he speculated that there may have been a "religious revival" at the time, which led to huge amounts of resources being expended on the construction of ceremonial monuments.

Archaeologist Aaron Watson highlighted the possibility that by digging up earth and using it to construct the large banks, those Neolithic labourers constructing the Avebury monument symbolically saw themselves as turning the land "inside out", thereby creating a space that was "on a frontier between worlds above and beneath the ground."

=== Henge ===
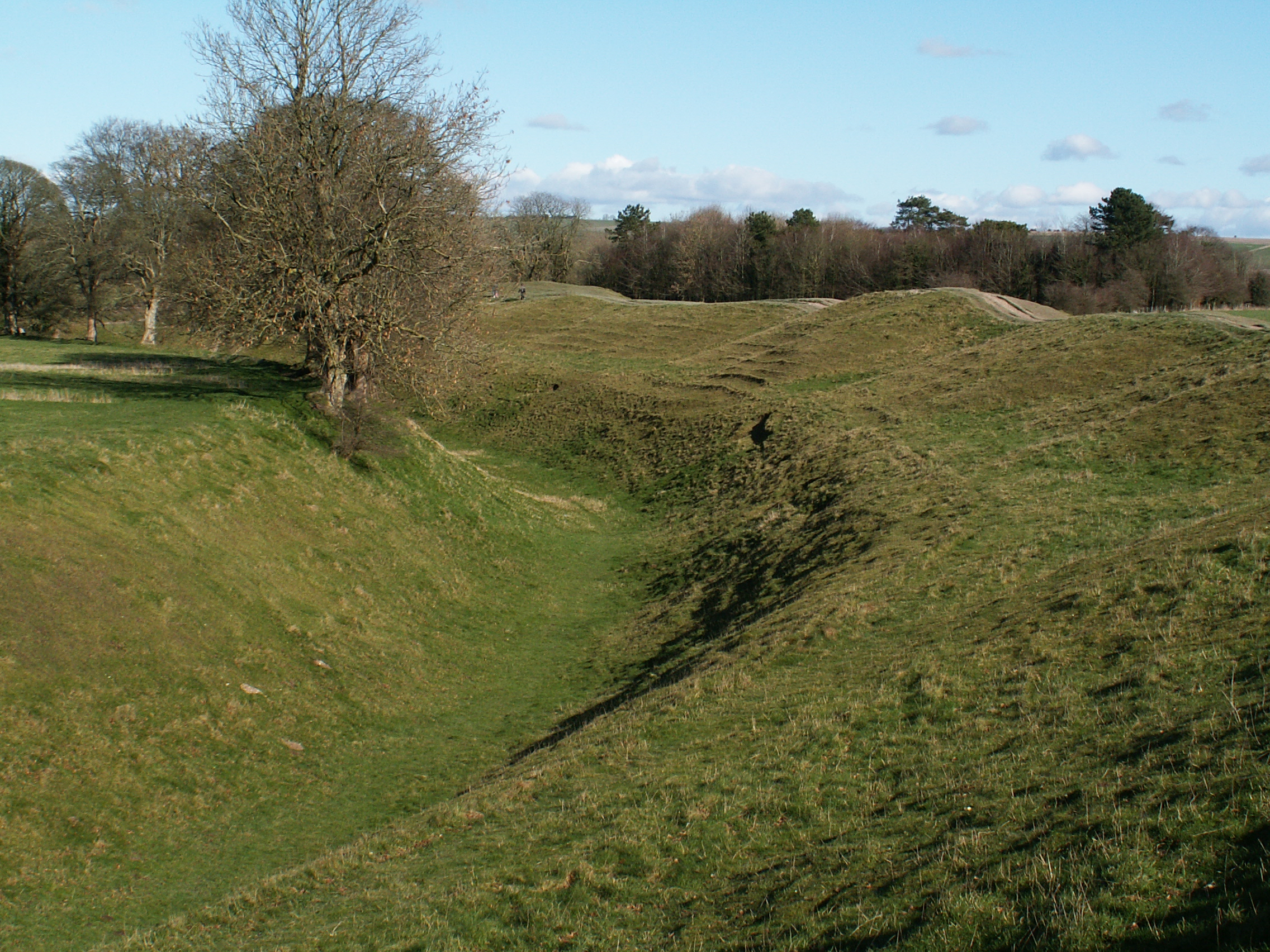
Part of the outer ditch

The Avebury monument is a henge, a type of monument consisting of a large circular bank with an internal ditch. The henge is not perfectly circular and measures 347.4 metres (380 yd) in diameter and over 1,000 metres (1,090 yd) in circumference.

Radiocarbon dating suggests that the henge was made by the middle of the third millennium BC.

The top of the bank is irregular, something Caroline Malone suggested was because of the irregular nature of the work undertaken by excavators working on the adjacent sectors of the ditch. Later archaeologists such as Aaron Watson, Mark Gillings and Joshua Pollard have, however, suggested that this was an original Neolithic feature of the henge's architecture.

=== Outer Stone Circle ===
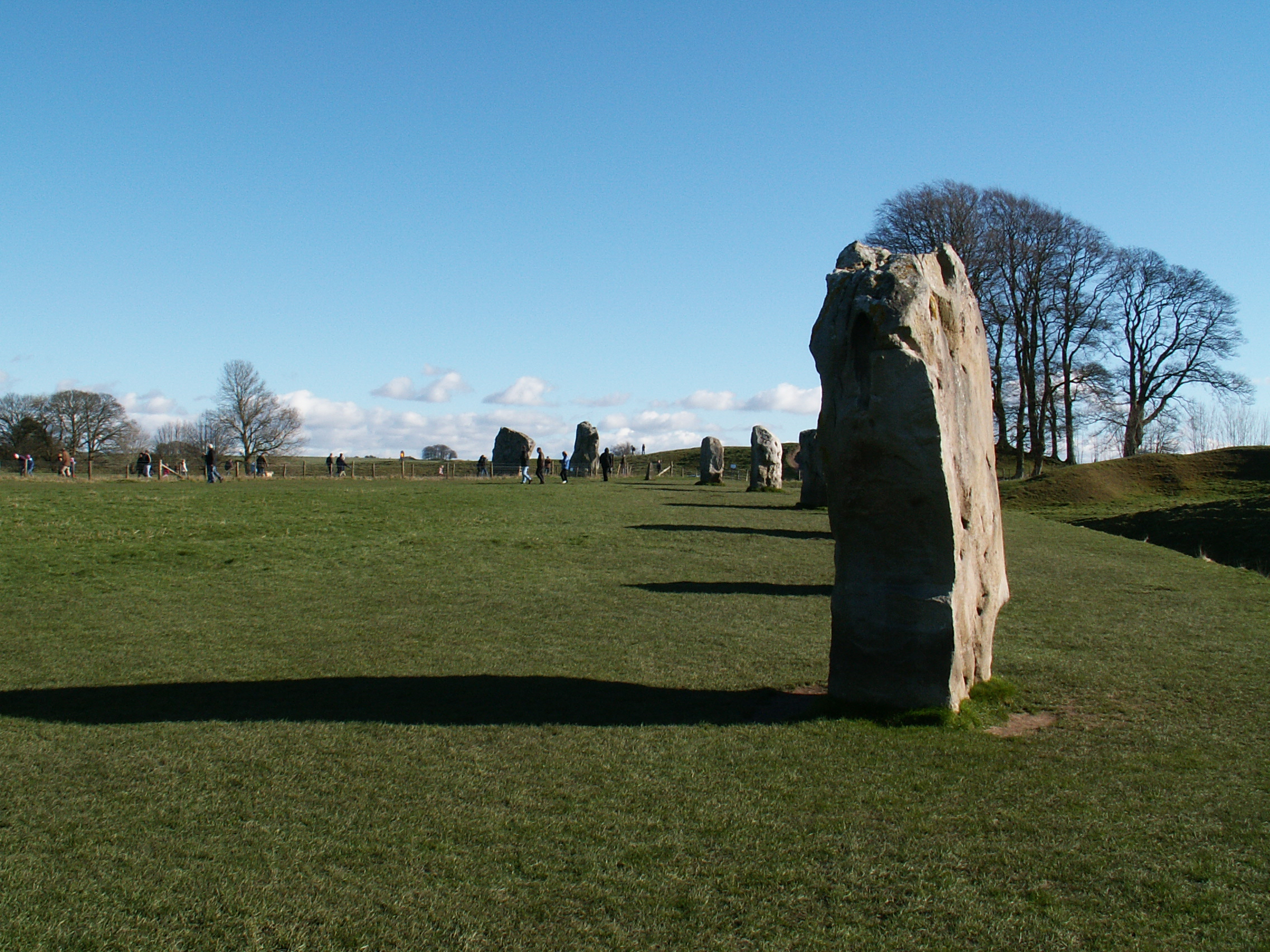
Part of the Outer Circle

Within the henge is a great outer circle. With a diameter of 331.6 metres (1,088 ft), this is one of Europe's largest stone circles, and Britain's largest. It was either contemporary with, or built around four or five centuries after, the earthworks. It is thought that there were originally 98 sarsen standing stones, some weighing in excess of 40 tons. The stones varied in height from 3.6 metres (12 ft) to 4.2 metres (14 ft), as exemplified at the north and south entrances. Radiocarbon dating of some stone settings indicate a construction date of around 2870–2200 BC.

The two large stones at the southern entrance had an unusually smooth surface, likely due to having stone axes polished on them.

=== Inner Stone Circles ===
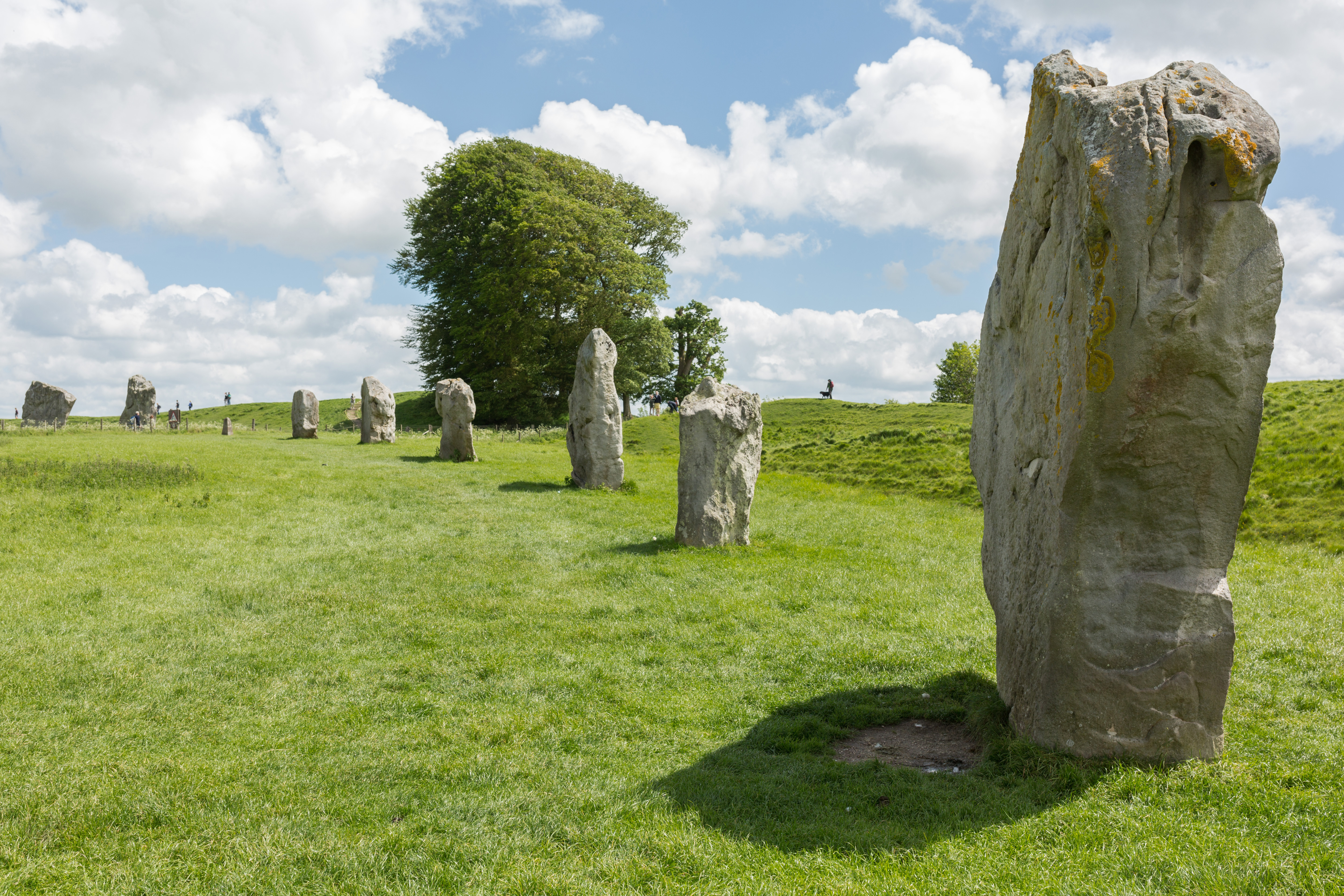
South inner circle of megaliths within the Avebury henge stone circle

Nearer the middle of the monument are two additional, separate stone circles. The northern inner ring is 98 metres (322 ft) in diameter, but only two of its four standing stones remain upright. A cove of three stones stood in the middle, its entrance facing northeast. Taking experiments undertaken at the megalithic Ring of Brodgar in Orkney as a basis, the archaeologists Joshua Pollard, Mark Gillings and Aaron Watson believed that any sounds produced inside Avebury's Inner Circles would have created an echo as sound waves reflected off the standing stones.

The southern inner ring was 108 metres (354 ft) in diameter before its destruction in the 18th century. The remaining sections of its arc now lie beneath the village buildings. A single large monolith, 5.5 metres (18 ft) high, stood in the centre along with an alignment of smaller stones.

In 2017, a geophysical survey by archaeologists from the Universities of Leicester and Southampton indicated 'an apparently unique square megalithic monument within the Avebury circles' which may be one of the earliest structures on this site.

=== The Avenue ===
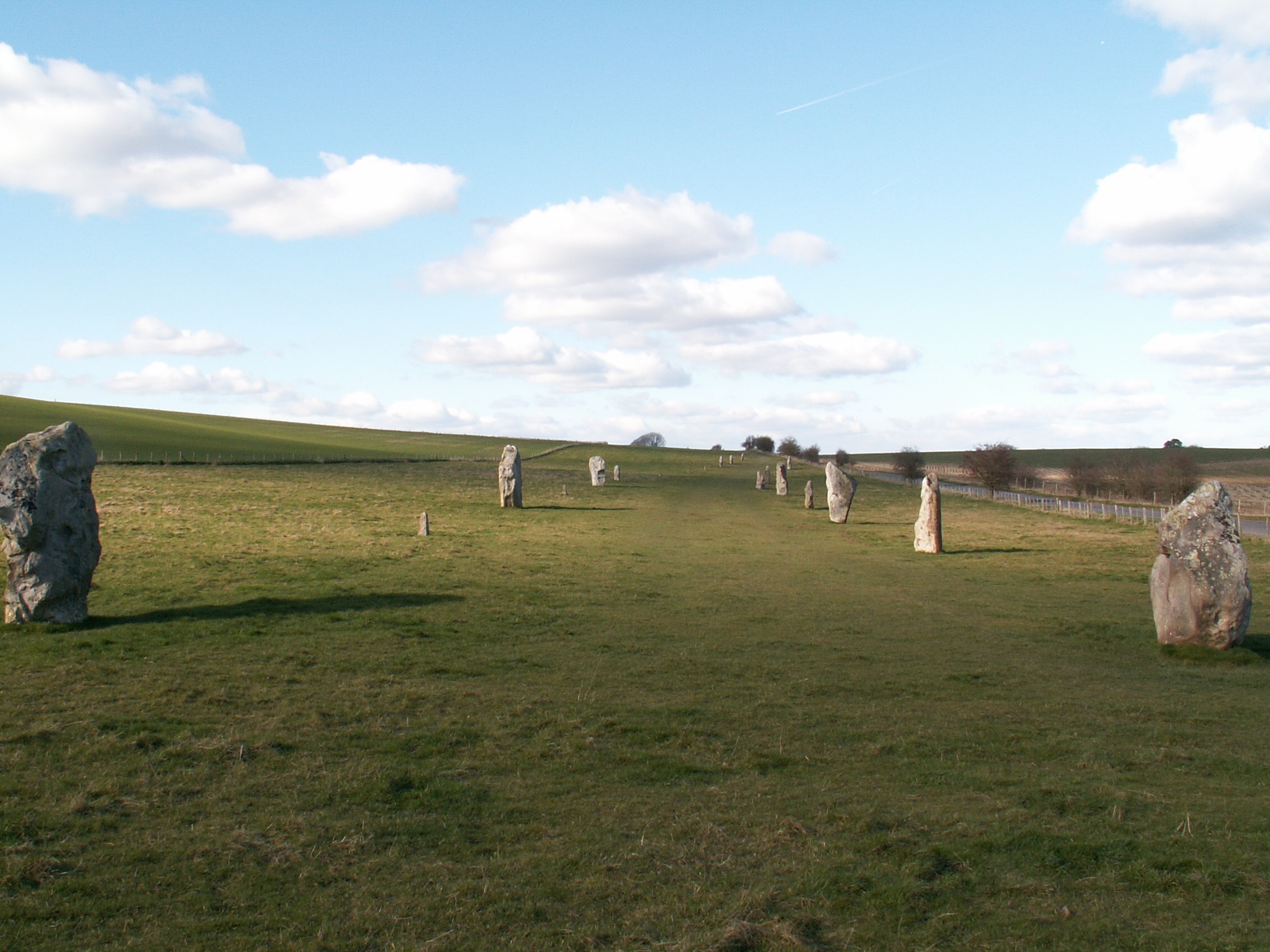
The stone avenue

The West Kennet Avenue, an avenue of paired stones, leads from the southeastern entrance of the henge; and traces of a second, the Beckhampton Avenue, lead out from the western entrance.

The archaeologist Aaron Watson, taking a phenomenological viewpoint to the monument, believed that the way in which the Avenue had been constructed in juxtaposition to Avebury, the Sanctuary, Silbury Hill and West Kennet Long Barrow had been intentional, commenting that "the Avenue carefully orchestrated passage through the landscape which influenced how people could move and what they could see, emphasising connections between places and maximising the spectacle of moving between these monuments."

== Purpose ==
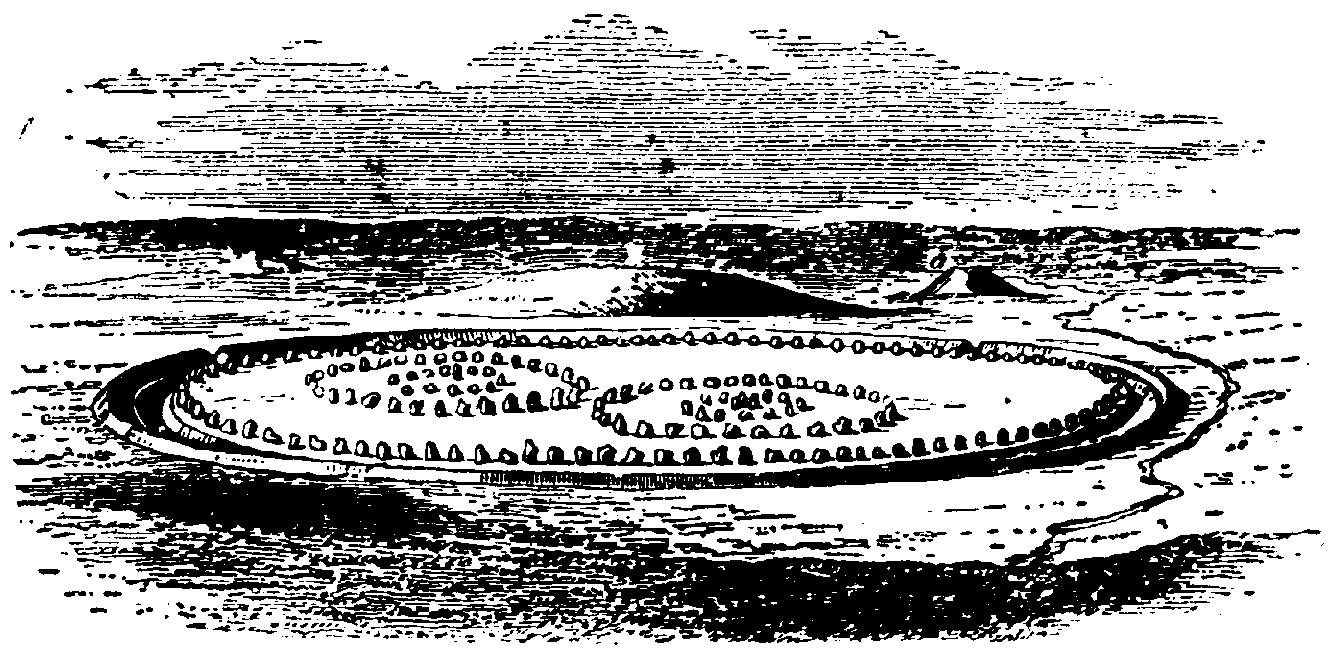
The postulated original layout of Avebury, published in a late 19th-century edition of the Swedish encyclopaedia Nordisk familjebok. Original illustration by John Martin, based on an illustration by John Britton

The purpose which Neolithic people had for the Avebury monument has remained elusive, although many archaeologists have postulated about its meaning and usage. Many suggest that the henge could have been a meeting place for the citizens of the area for seasonal fairs or festivals. During that time the people would have been watching ceremonies or standing on the earthen banks. A lack of pottery and animal bone from excavations at Avebury suggest that the entrance to the henge was prohibited. The lack of "mess" and archaeological finds indicates "sanctity". Many of the stones had former uses before being transported to Avebury. For instance, many of the sarsens had been used to polish stone axes, while others had been "heavily worked".

Archaeologist Aubrey Burl believed that rituals would have been performed at Avebury by Neolithic peoples in order "to appease the malevolent powers of nature" that threatened their existence, such as the winter cold, death and disease.

In his study of those examples found at Orkney, Colin Richards suggested that the stone and wooden circles built in Neolithic Britain might have represented the centre of the world, or axis mundi, for those who constructed them, something Aaron Watson adopted as a possibility in his discussion of Avebury.

A great deal of interest surrounds the morphology of the stones, which are usually described as being in one of two categories; tall and slender, or short and squat. This has led to numerous theories relating to the importance of gender in Neolithic Britain with the taller stones considered "male" and the shorter ones "female". The stones were not dressed in any way and may have been chosen for their pleasing natural forms.

The human bones found by Gray point to some form of funerary purpose and have parallels in the disarticulated human bones often found at earlier causewayed enclosure sites. Ancestor worship on a huge scale could have been one of the purposes of the monument and would not necessarily have been mutually exclusive with any male/female ritual role.

The henge, although clearly forming an imposing boundary to the circle, could have had a purpose that was not defensive as the ditch is on the inside (this is the defining characteristic of a henge). Being a henge and stone circle site, astronomical alignments are a common theory to explain the positioning of the stones at Avebury. The relationships between the causewayed enclosure, Avebury stone circles, and West Kennet Long Barrow to the south, has caused some to describe the area as a "ritual complex"—a site with many monuments of interlocking religious function. Based on the scale of the site and wealth of archaeological material found in its ditches, particularly animal bone, it is theorised that the enclosure on Windmill Hill was a major, extra-regional focus for gatherings and feasting events.

== Comparable sites ==
While unique in form and scale today, Avebury possibly once had a direct sister site, Shap Avenue in Cumbria, Northwest England, which allegedly featured two expansive megalithic avenues joined to an exceptionally large central stone circle. The site was destroyed in the 18th and early 19th centuries, and today, only its terminal end survives - known as "Kemp Howe". This terminal end is directly comparable to Avebury's lost Sanctuary stone circle, which also formed the terminal of a long megalithic avenue.

Before the 18th century, Shap Avenue stood as the only comparable site to Avebury, making it a popular destination for early antiquarians. William Stukeley managed to survey the site before it was largely dismantled, arriving sometime before 1725. Comparing the landscape to his work at Avebury, he observed:

“Though its journey be northward ... it makes a very large curve, or an arc of a circle, as those at Avebury, and passes over a brook too. A spring likewise arises in it, near the Greyhound inn.”

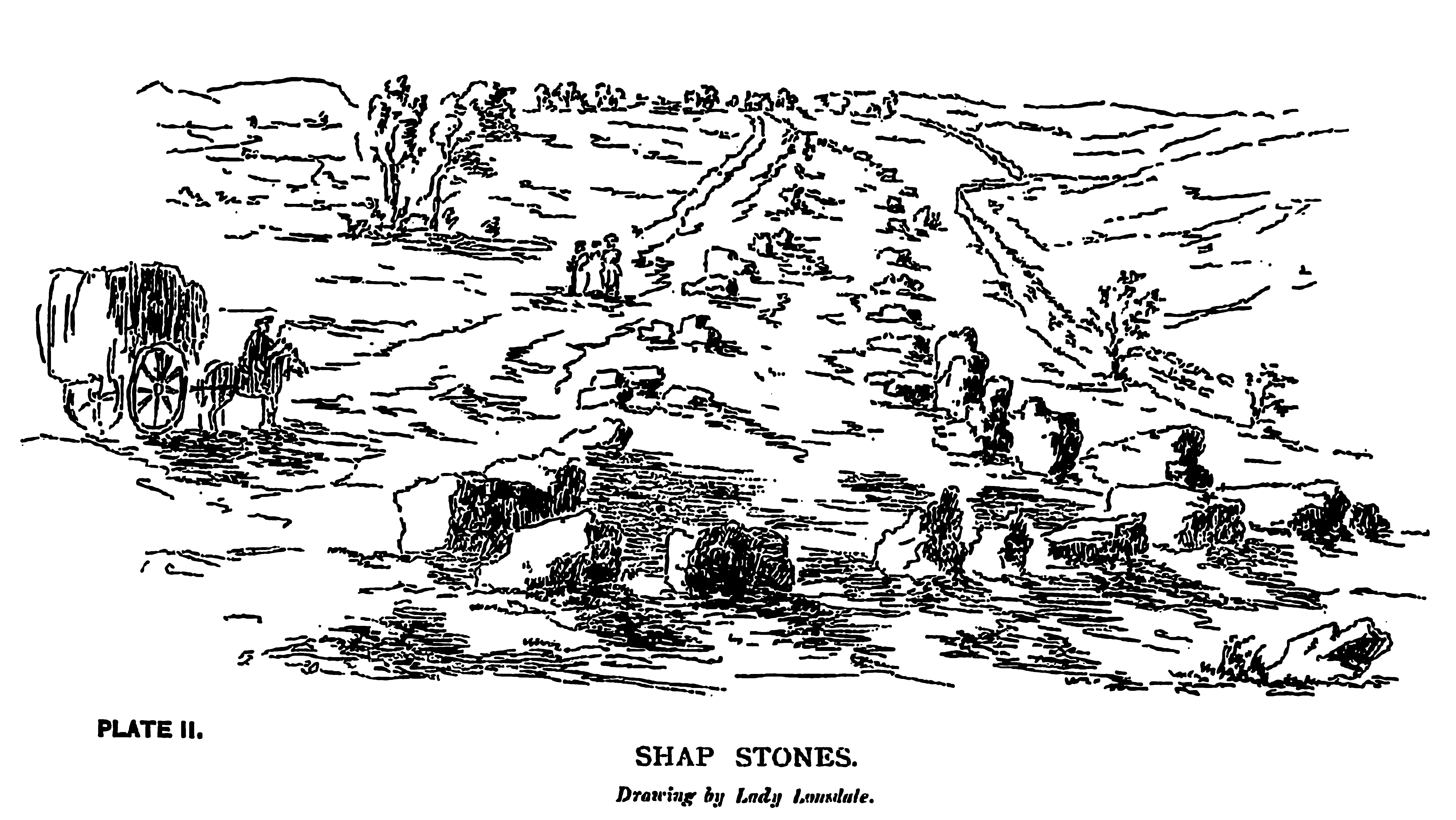
A drawing of Lady Lowther's 1777 painting of Shap Avenue, Cumbria. The painting focuses on "Kemp Howe" which appears to have served as the terminal end comparable to Avebury's "The Sanctuary". Kemp Howe survives today.

Stukeley’s interest had been piqued by a map of the monument sent to him by a 'Mr. Routh'. Marvelling at the scale of its "Avebury-like serpentine" layout, which stretched over a mile-and-a-half despite local pillaging, Stukeley wrote:

"I have a vast drawing and measurement from Mr. Routh, of Carlisle, of the stones at Shap, in Westmoreland, which I desired from him. They give me so much satisfaction that verily I shall call on you next year to take another religions pilgrimage' with me thither. I find it to be, what I always supposed, another huge serpentine temple, like that of ABVRY. The measure of what are left extends a mile and a half, but without doubt a great deal of it has been demolished by the town, and by everything else thereabouts..."

== Archaeology ==
In the summers between 1719 and 1724 William Stukeley surveyed and recorded what remains of the Avebury site. During his work the process of "stone breaking" was taking place.

=== 1800s ===
In 1829, the foot of the Cove stone was dug to a 'yard' in depth, and in 1833 Henry Browne claimed to find evidence for 'burnt human sacrifices' also at the Cove in the north-east sector. in 1865, the Wiltshire Archaeological and Natural History Society supported A. C. Smith and W. Cunnington to spend a week directing excavations in fourteen places, including around the Cove; they found no human bones. In 1894 Sir Henry Meux sponsored excavations which put a trench through the bank of the south-east sector, which gave the first indication that the earthwork was built in two phases. At a depth of 4 feet a "curious box-like structure formed of chalk blocks was uncovered which contained twenty deer horn picks of large size, all worn down by use, the tines being almost gone". Finds included 3 worked flints.

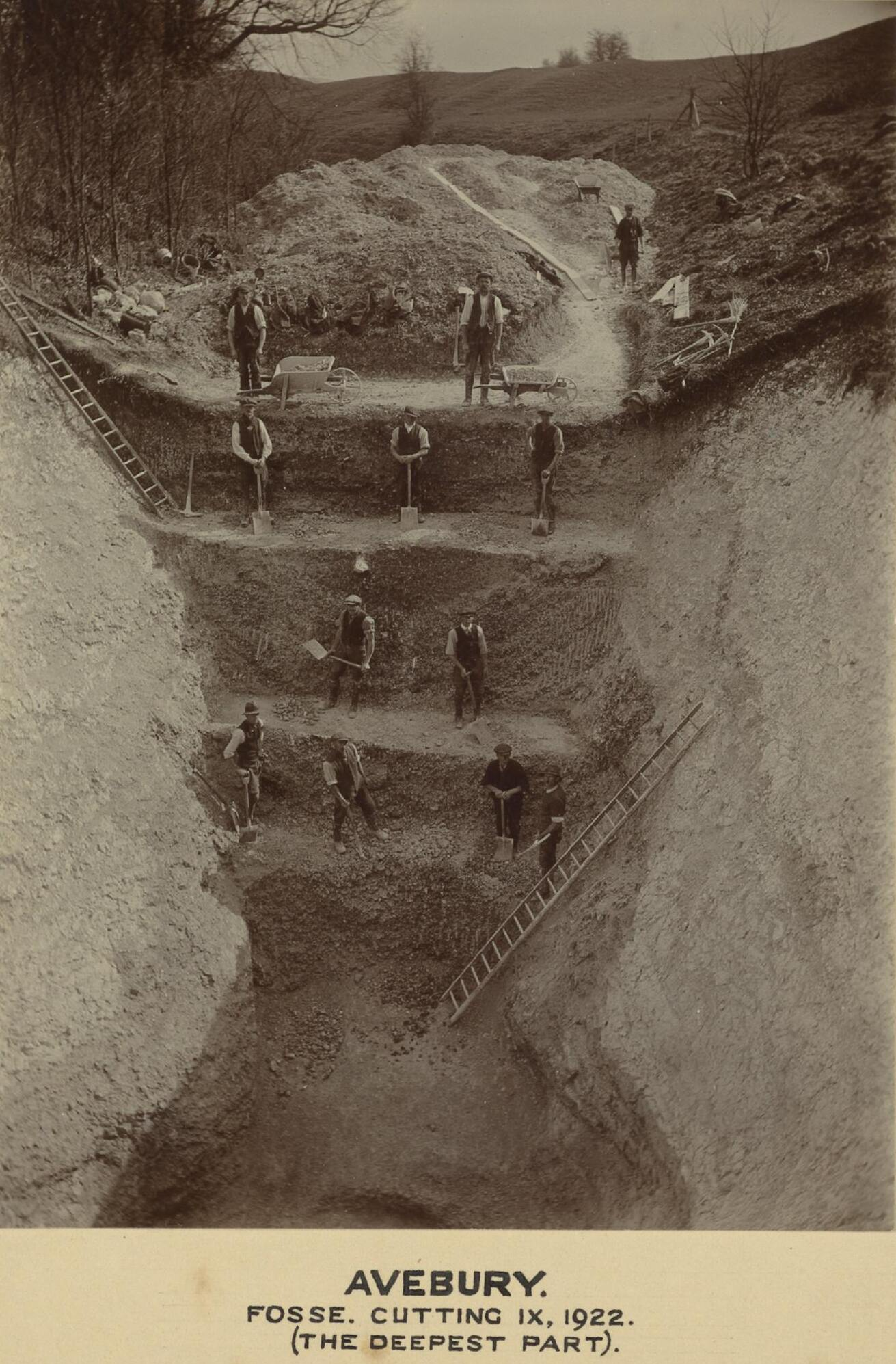
Excavations at Avebury ditch showing 12 workers, taken on 21 April 1922, by Harold St George Gray

=== 1908–1922 ===
The site was surveyed and excavated in 1908, 1909, 1911, 1914, and 1922 by a team of workmen under the direction of Harold St George Gray, on behalf of the British Association. In 1908 a group walking the site and inspecting the excavations reported "Mr. Gray went down 17 ft. from the present bottom to the original one. He found various levels with pottery, the oldest and lowest being either early Bronze or pure Neolithic, dating Avebury as 1700 BC". The discovery of over 40 antler picks on or near the bottom of the ditch enabled Gray to demonstrate that the Avebury builders had dug down 11 metres (36 ft) into the natural chalk using red deer antlers as their primary digging tool, producing a henge ditch with a 9-metre (30 ft) high bank around its perimeter. Gray recorded the base of the ditch as being 4 metres (13 ft) wide and flat, but later archaeologists have questioned his use of untrained labour to excavate the ditch and suggested that its form may have been different. Gray found few artefacts in the ditch-fill but he did recover scattered human bones, amongst which jawbones were particularly well represented. At a depth of about 2 metres (7 ft), Gray found the complete skeleton of a 1.5-metre (5 ft) tall woman.

=== 1934–1939 ===
Alexander Keiller financed and led excavations on West Kennet Avenue in 1934 and 1935; the North West sector of Avebury in 1937; the South West sector in 1938, and the South East sector in 1939.

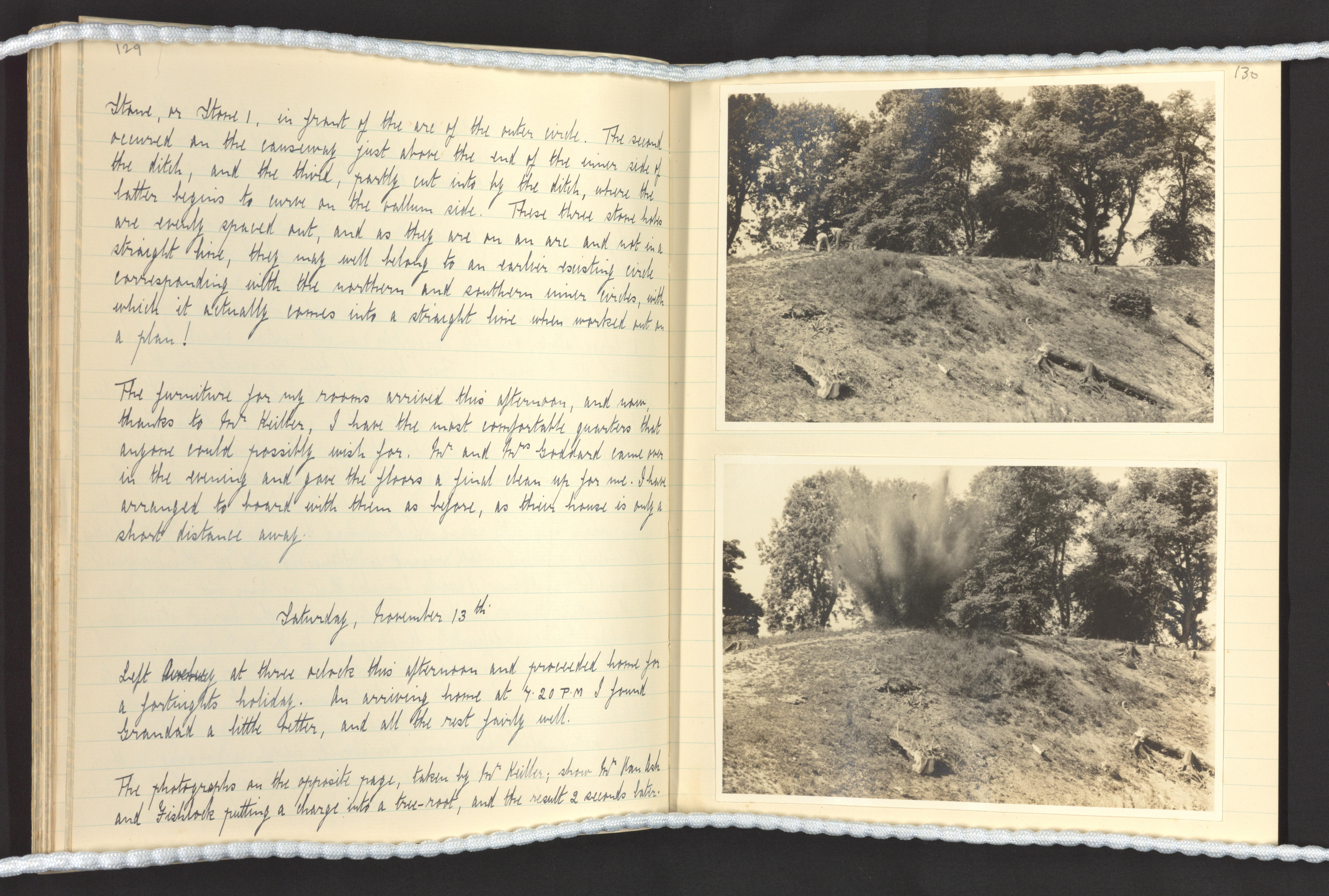
A spread from foreman William Young's Leaves from My Journal Volume 7. Two photographs by Alexander Keiller show Mr Van Ash (an explosives expert) and Frank Fishlock exploding tree stumps at Avebury in 1937.

It can reasonably be said that "Avebury today is largely Keiller's creation", as Keiller directed his team to find and re-erect fallen or buried stones, and to build concrete 'pylons' in the place of missing stones. Stuart Piggott co-directed excavations; local archaeologist William E. V. Young served as Foreman; Doris Emerson Chapman illustrated the stones and facial reconstructions for the human remains found across the landscape; and Denis Grant King created illustrations, plans and section drawings. Upwards of 50 men from across Wiltshire served as 'hands' during the excavations over the 6 year period, doing the hard work of digging and re-erecting stones.

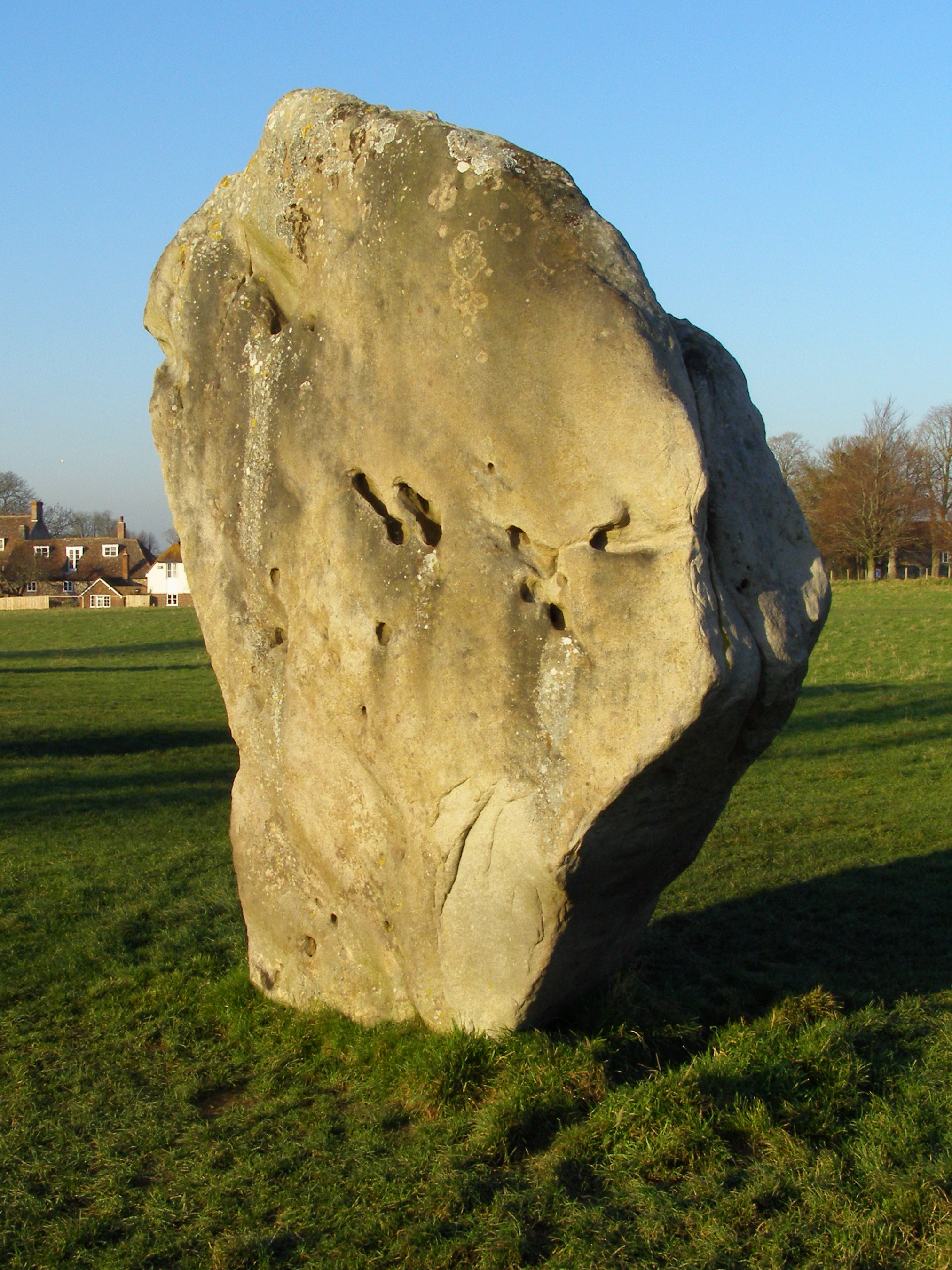
The Barber Stone

During excavations in 1938, Keiller's team excavated the skeleton of a man from beneath Stone 38 (Stone 9 using Isobel Smith's system), now known as the Barber surgeon of Avebury. Coins dating from the 1320s were found with the skeleton, and the evidence suggests that the man was fatally injured when the stone fell on him whilst he was digging the hole in which it was to be buried in a mediaeval "rite of destruction". As well as the coins, Keiller's team found a pair of scissors and a lancet, the tools of a barber-surgeon at that time, hence the name given to the stone.

Alexander Keiller and Stuart Piggott published short reports from the excavations, however the outbreak of World War II, Keiller's failing health and dwindling finances, and Piggott's career which took him abroad during the war and into new archaeological projects post war, meant that they did not publish a full report. The archeologist Isobel Smith was commissioned by Gabrielle Keiller to synthesise and complete the full report. Smith completed the publication in 1965, reorganised the stone numbering system for the landscape, and put Windmill Hill, Avebury and West Kennet Avenue into context.

While there are thought to have originally been 98 standing stones by 1939 only 9 remained standing, with another 10 fallen. The rest had been destroyed or buried by villagers, a process which began at least as early as the 1700s.

=== 1969–1982 ===
In 1960 a brief, 5 day, excavation of the site was conducted by Stuart Piggott. Roughly 1500 square feet of area was excavated looking for possible stone holes. None were found.

When a new village school was built in 1969 there was a further opportunity to examine the site, and in 1982 an excavation to produce carbon dating material and environmental data was undertaken.

=== 2003 ===
In April 2003, during preparations to straighten some of the stones, one was found to extend at least 2.1 metres (7 ft) below ground. It was estimated to weigh more than 100 tons, making it one of the largest found in the UK. Later that year, a geophysical survey of the southeast and northeast quadrants of the circle by the National Trust revealed at least 15 of the megaliths lying buried. The survey identified their sizes, the direction in which they are lying, and where they fitted in the circle.

== Development after the Neolithic ==
=== Iron Age and Roman periods ===
During the British Iron Age, it appears that the Avebury monument had ceased to be used for its original purpose, and was instead largely ignored, with little archaeological evidence that many people visited the site at this time. Archaeologist Aubrey Burl believed that the Iron Age Britons living in the region would not have known when, why or by whom the monument had been constructed, perhaps having some vague understanding that it had been built by an earlier society or considering it to be the dwelling of a supernatural entity.

In 43 AD, the Roman Empire invaded southern Britain, making alliances with certain local monarchs and subsuming the Britons under their own political control. Southern and central Britain would remain a part of the Empire until the early 5th century, in a period now known as Roman Britain or the Roman Iron Age. It was during this Roman period that tourists came from the nearby towns of Cunetio, Durocornovium and the villas and farms around Devizes and visited Avebury and its surrounding prehistoric monuments via a newly constructed road. Evidence of visitors at the monument during this period has been found in the form of Roman-era pottery sherds uncovered from the ditch.

=== Early Mediaeval period ===
In the Early Middle Ages, which began in the 5th century, following the collapse of Roman rule, Anglo-Saxon tribes from continental Europe migrated to southern Britain, where they may have come into conflict with the Britons already settled there. Aubrey Burl suggested the possibility that a small group of British warriors may have used Avebury as a fortified site to defend themselves from Anglo-Saxon attack. He gained this idea from etymological evidence, suggesting that the site may have been called weala-dic (alt - Waledich), meaning "moat of the Britons", in Old English, the language of the Anglo-Saxons.

The early Anglo-Saxon settlers followed their own pagan religion which venerated a selection of deities, the most notable of whom were apparently Woden and Thunor. It is known from etymological sources that they associated many prehistoric sites in the Wiltshire area with their gods, for instance within a ten-mile of radius of Avebury there are four sites that were apparently named after Woden: Wansdyke ("Wodin's ditch"), Wodin's Barrow, Waden Hill ("Wodin's Hill)" and perhaps Wanborough (also "Woden's Hill"). It is not known if they placed any special religious associations with the Avebury monument, but it remains possible.

During the Early Mediaeval period, there were signs of settlement at Avebury, with a grubenhaus, a type of timber hut with a sunken floor, being constructed just outside the monument's west bank in the 6th century. Only a few farmers appeared to have inhabited the area at the time, and they left the Avebury monument largely untouched. In the 7th and 8th centuries, the Anglo-Saxon peoples began gradually converting to Christianity, and during the 10th century a church was built just west of the monument.

In 939, the earliest known written record of the monument was made in the form of a charter of King Athelstan which defined the boundaries of Overton, a parish adjacent to Avebury. In the following century, invading Viking armies from Denmark came into conflict with Anglo-Saxon groups in the area around Avebury, and it may be that they destroyed Avebury village, for the local prehistoric monument of Silbury Hill was fortified and used as a defensive position, apparently by a local Anglo-Saxon population attempting to protect themselves from Viking aggression.

=== Late Mediaeval period ===
The skeletal remains of the man, likely a barber-surgeon, who was killed in an accident whilst trying to topple the stones at Avebury in the early 14th century

By the Late Middle Ages, England had been entirely converted to Christianity, and Avebury, being an evidently non-Christian monument, began to be associated with the Devil in the popular imagination of the locals. The largest stone at the southern entrance became known as the Devil's Chair, the three stones that once formed the Beckhampton Cove became known as the Devil's Quoits and the stones inside the North Circle became known as the Devil's Brand-Irons. At some point in the early 14th century, villagers began to demolish the monument by pulling down the large standing stones and burying them in ready-dug pits at the side, presumably because they were seen as having been erected by the Devil and thereby being in opposition to the village's Christian beliefs. Although it is unknown how this situation came about, archaeologist Aubrey Burl suggests that it might have been at the prompting of the local Christian priest, with the likely contenders being either Thomas Mayn (who served in the village from 1298 to 1319), or John de Hoby (who served from 1319 to 1324).

Archaeologists found a man's body under one of the toppled stones in 1938. He had been carrying a leather pouch, in which were three silver coins dated to around 1320–25, as well as a pair of iron scissors and a lancet. From these latter two items, the archaeologists surmised that he had probably been a travelling barber-surgeon who journeyed between market towns offering his services. It appears that the death of the barber-surgeon prevented the locals from pulling down further stones, perhaps fearing that it had in some way been retribution for toppling them in the first place, enacted by a vengeful spirit or even the Devil himself. The event appears to have left a significant influence on the minds of the local villagers, for records show that in the 18th and 19th centuries there were still legends being told in the community about a man being crushed by a falling stone.

Soon after the toppling of many of the stones, the Black Death hit the village in 1349, almost halving the population. Those who survived focused on their agricultural duties to grow food and stay alive. As a result, they would not have had the time or manpower to once more attempt to demolish any part of the non-Christian monument, even if they had wanted to.

=== Early Modern period ===
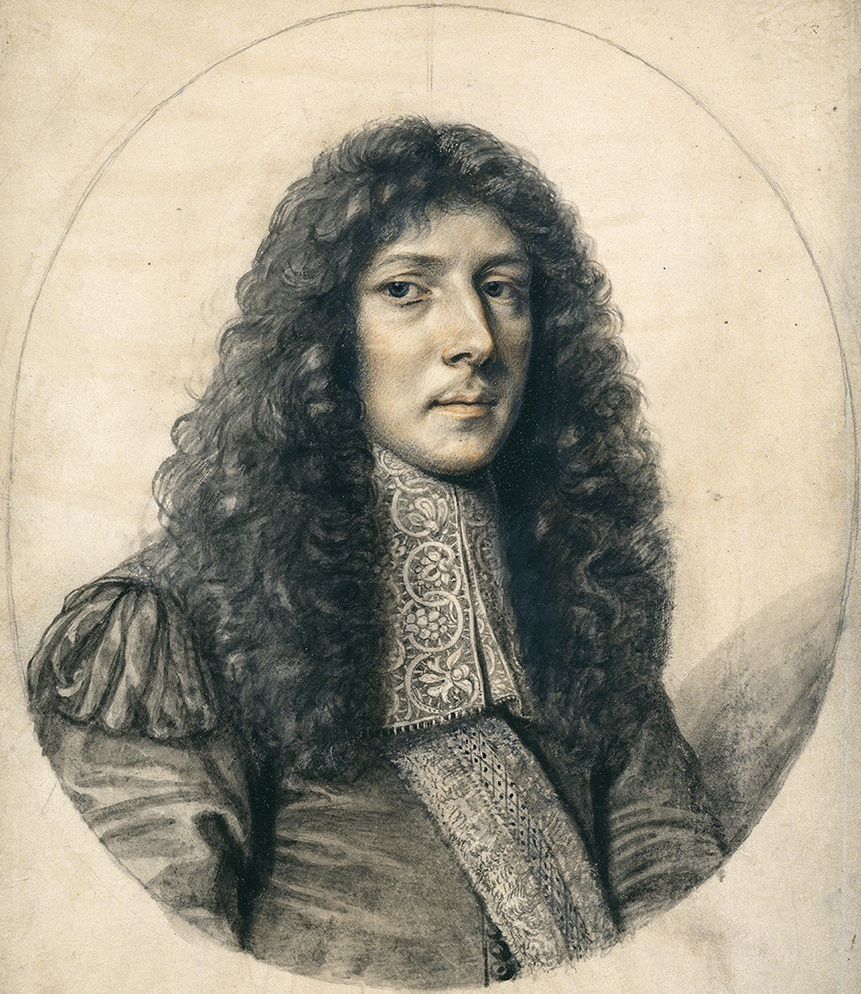
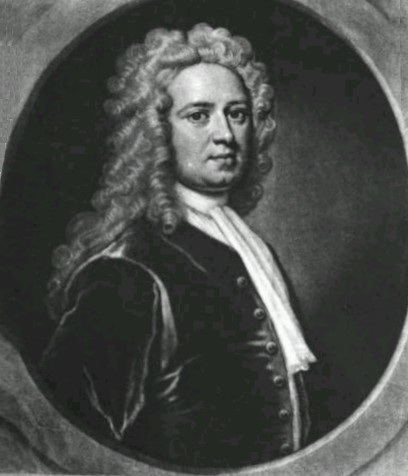
The antiquarians John Aubrey and William Stukeley are responsible for initiating modern study of the Avebury monument.

It was in the Early modern period that Avebury was first recognised as an antiquity that warranted investigation. Around 1541, John Leland, the librarian and chaplain to King Henry VIII travelled through Wiltshire and made note of the existence of Avebury and its neighbouring prehistoric monuments. Despite this, Avebury remained relatively unknown to anyone but locals and when the antiquarian William Camden published his Latin language guide to British antiquities, Britannia, in 1586, he made no mention of it. He rectified this for his English language version in 1610, but even in this he only included a fleeting reference to the monument at "Abury", believing it to have been "an old camp". In 1634, it was once more referenced, this time in Sir John Harington's notes to the Orlando Furioso opera; however, further antiquarian investigation was prevented by the outbreak of the English Civil War (1642–51), which was waged between the Parliamentarians and Royalists, with one of the battles in the conflict taking place five miles away from Avebury at Roundway Down.

With the war over, a new edition of the Britannia was published in 1695, which described the monument at "Aubury" in more detail. This entry had been written by the antiquarian and writer John Aubrey, who privately made many notes about Avebury and other prehistoric monuments which remained unpublished. Aubrey had first encountered the site whilst out hunting in 1649 and, in his own words, had been "wonderfully surprised at the sight of those vast stones of which I had never heard before." Hearing of Avebury and taking an interest in it, King Charles II commanded Aubrey to come to him and describe the site, which he did in July 1663. The two subsequently travelled to visit it together on the monarch's trip to Bath, Somerset, a fortnight later, and the site further captivated the king's interest, who commanded Aubrey to dig underneath the stones in search of any human burials. Aubrey, however, never undertook the king's order. In September 1663, Aubrey began making a more systematic study of the site, producing a plan that has proved invaluable for later archaeologists, for it contained reference to many standing stones that would soon after be destroyed by locals.

In the latter part of the 17th and then the 18th centuries, destruction at Avebury reached its peak, possibly influenced by the rise of Puritanism in the village, a fundamentalist form of Protestant Christianity that vehemently denounced things considered to be "pagan", which would have included pre-Christian monuments like Avebury. The majority of the standing stones that had been a part of the monument for thousands of years were smashed up to be used as building material for the local area. This was achieved by lighting a fire to heat the sarsen, then pouring cold water on it to create weaknesses in the rock, and finally smashing at the fire-cracked rock with a sledgehammer.

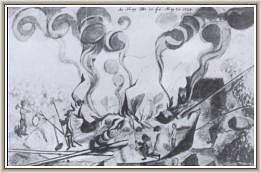
William Stukeley's drawing of the stones being broken up by fire

In 1719, the antiquarian William Stukeley visited the site, where he witnessed the destruction being undertaken by the local people. Between then and 1724 he visited the village and its monument six times, sometimes staying for two or three weeks at the Catherine Wheel Inn. In this time, he made meticulous plans of the site, considering it to be a "British Temple", and believing it to having been fashioned by the druids, the Iron Age priests of north-western Europe, in the year 1859 BC. He developed the idea that the two Inner Circles were a temple to the moon and to the sun, respectively, and eventually came to believe that Avebury and its surrounding monuments were a landscaped portrayal of the Trinity, thereby backing up his erroneous ideas that the ancient druids had been followers of a religion very much like Christianity.

Stukeley was disgusted by the destruction of the sarsen stones in the monument, and named those local farmers and builders who were responsible. He remarked that "this stupendous fabric, which for some thousands of years, had brav'd the continual assaults of weather, and by the nature of it, when left to itself, like the pyramids of Egypt, would have lasted as long as the globe, hath fallen a sacrifice to the wretched ignorance and avarice of a little village unluckily plac'd within it."

Stukeley published his findings and theories in a book, Abury, a Temple of the British Druids (1743), in which he intentionally falsified some of the measurements he had made of the site to better fit his theories about its design and purpose. Meanwhile, the Reverend Thomas Twining had also published a book about the monument, Avebury in Wiltshire, the Remains of a Roman Work, which had been published in 1723. Whereas Stukeley claimed that Avebury and related prehistoric monuments were the creations of the druids, Twining thought that they had been constructed by the later Romans, justifying his conclusion on the fact that Roman writers like Julius Caesar and Tacitus had not referred to stone circles when discussing the Iron Age Britons, whereas Late Mediaeval historians like Geoffrey of Monmouth and Henry of Huntingdon had described these megaliths in their works, and that such monuments must have therefore been constructed between the two sets of accounts.

=== Victorian period and early 20th century ===
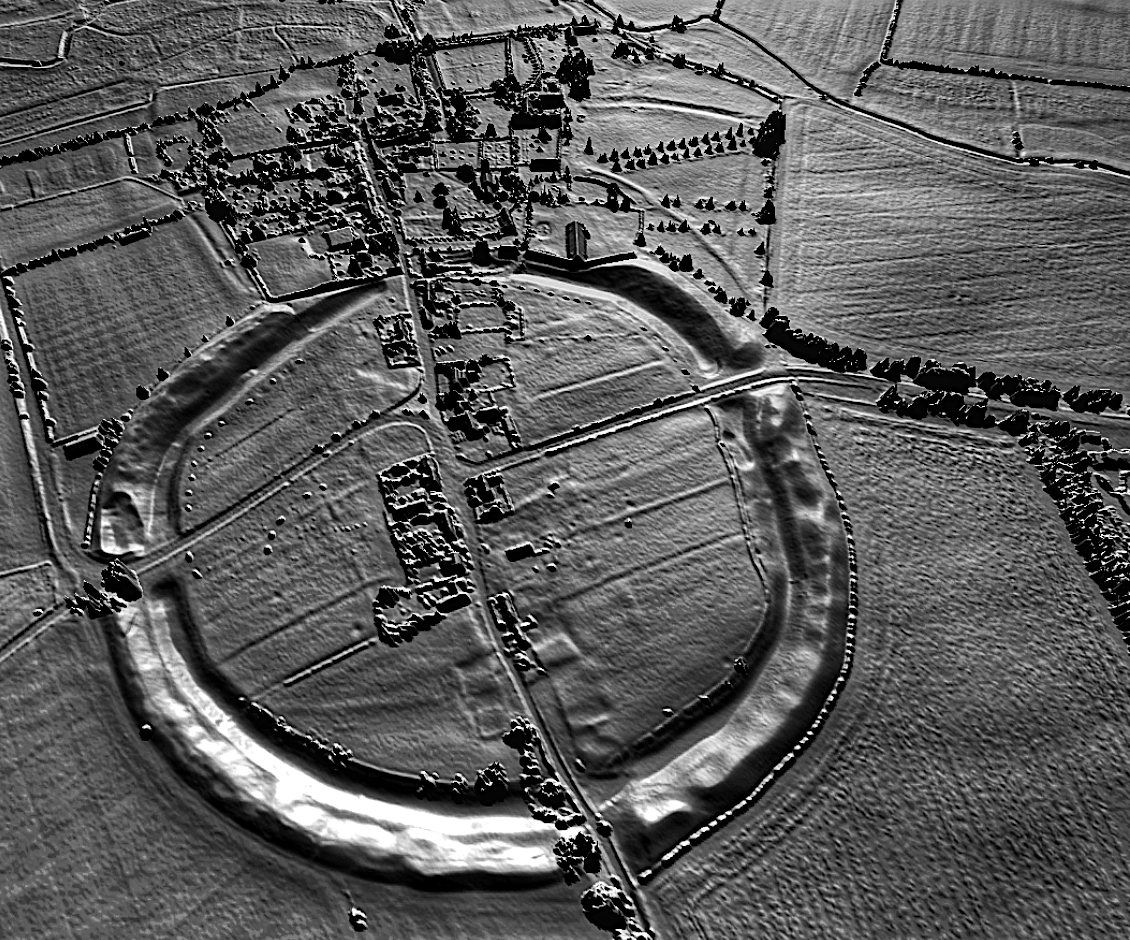
A lidar image of Avebury in Wiltshire

By the beginning of the Victorian era in 1837, the majority of Neolithic standing stones at Avebury had gone, having been either buried by pious locals in the 14th century or broken up for building materials in the 17th and 18th. Meanwhile, the population of Avebury village was rapidly increasing, leading to further housing being built inside the henge. In the 1870s, to prevent further construction on the site, the wealthy politician and archaeologist Sir John Lubbock (later created Baron Avebury) purchased much of the available land in the monument, and encouraged other buyers to build their houses outside rather than within the henge.

Archaeologist Alexander Keiller developed an interest in Avebury and West Kennet Avenue while conducting excavations at nearby Windmill Hill. Keiller decided that the best way to preserve Avebury was to purchase it in its entirety. Keiller was heir to the James Keiller and Son marmalade business and was able to use his wealth to acquire much of the site between 1924 and 1939. He also acquired Windmill Hill, as much of the Kennet Avenue as possible, and the nearby Avebury Manor, where he was to live until his death in 1955.

=== Post World War II ===
Keiller sold some of his property to the National Trust in 1943, and they went on to acquire further farmland in the area. The National Trust had a policy to demolish houses within the circle as they fell vacant, but by 1976, those remaining were allowed to stand.

The Stonehenge and Avebury landscape became a designated UNESCO World Heritage site in 1986.

The question of access to the site at certain times of the year has been controversial and the National Trust, who steward and protect the site, have held discussions with a number of groups. The National Trust have discouraged commercialism around the site, preventing many souvenir shops from opening up in an attempt to keep the area free from the "customary gaudiness that infiltrates most famous places" in the United Kingdom. Two shops have been opened in the village catering to the tourist market, one of which is the National Trust's own shop. The other, known as The Henge Shop, focuses on selling New Age paraphernalia and books.

By the late 1970s the site was being visited by around a quarter of a million visitors annually.

On 1 April 2014, as part of an April Fools' Day prank, the National Trust claimed through social media and a press release that their rangers were moving one of the stones in order to realign the circle with British Summer Time. The story was picked up by local media and The Guardian's "Best of the Web".

== Contemporary Paganism and the New Age movement ==
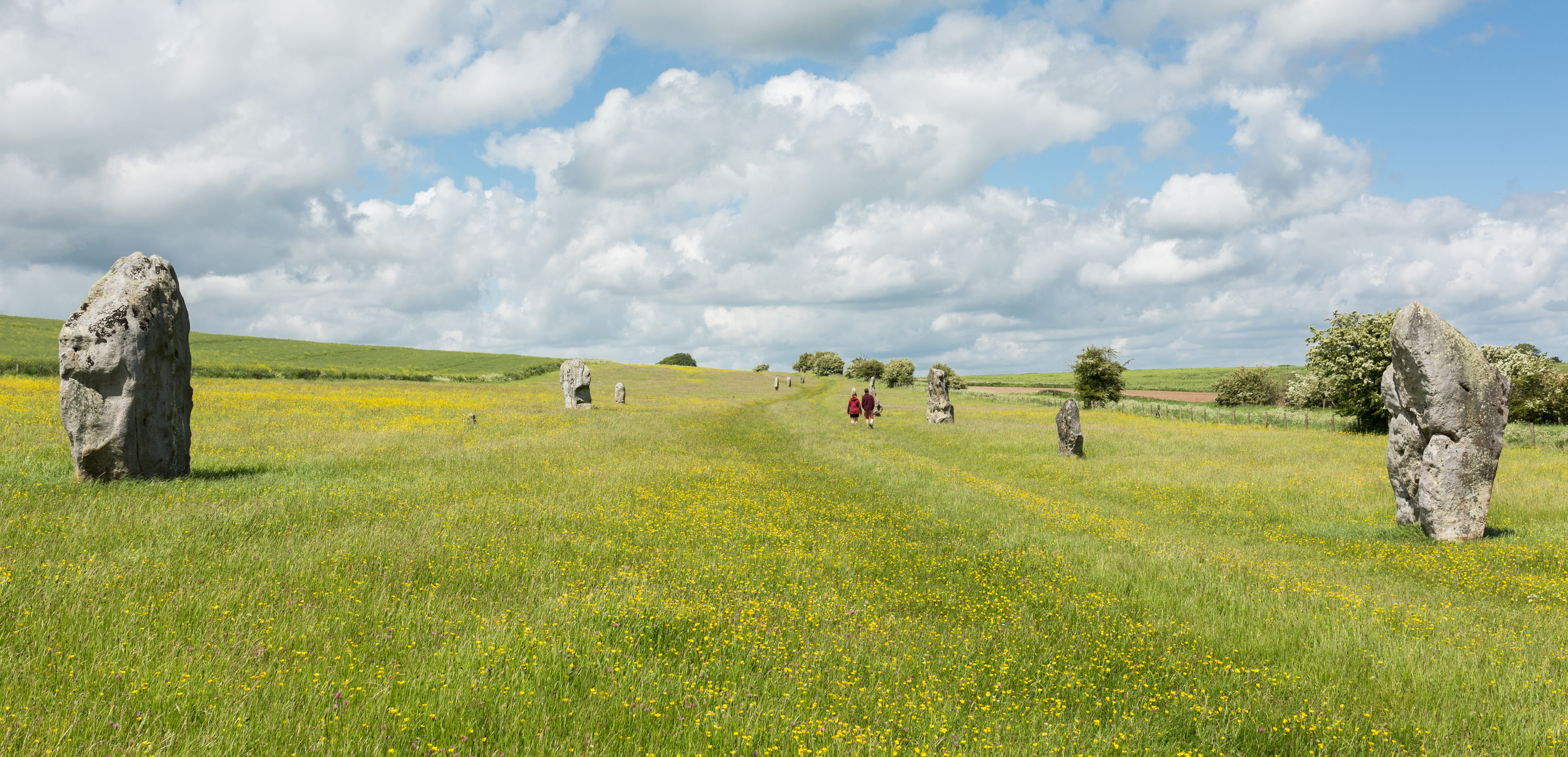
West Kennet Avenue

Avebury has been adopted as a sacred site by many adherents of contemporary Pagan religions such as Druidry, Wicca and Heathenry. These worshippers view the monument as a "living temple" which they associate with the ancestors, as well as with genii loci, or spirits of place. Typically, such Pagan rites at the site are performed publicly, and attract crowds of curious visitors to witness the event, particularly on major days of Pagan celebration such as the summer solstice.

Druidic rites held at Avebury are commonly known as gorseddau and involve participants invoking Awen (a Druidic concept meaning inspiration), with an eisteddfod section during which poems, songs and stories are publicly performed. The Druid Prayer composed by Iolo Morganwg in the 18th century and the later Druid Vow are typically recited. One particular group, known as the Gorsedd of Bards of Caer Abiri, focus almost entirely upon holding their rites at the prehistoric site, referring to it as Caer Abiri. In their original ceremony, composed by Philip Shallcrass of the British Druid Order in 1993, those assembled divide into two groups, one referred to as the God party and the other as the Goddess party. Those with the Goddess party go to the "Devil's Chair" at the southern entrance to the Avebury henge, where a woman representing the spirit guardian of the site and the Goddess who speaks through her sits in the chair-like cove in the southern face of the sarsen stone. Meanwhile, those following the God party process around the outer bank of the henge to the southern entrance, where they are challenged as to their intent and give offerings (often of flowers, fruit, bread or mead) to the Goddess's representative.

Due to the fact that various Pagan, and in particular Druid groups, perform their ceremonies at the site, a rota has been established, whereby the Loyal Arthurian Warband (LAW), the Secular Order of Druids (SOD) and the Glastonbury Order of Druids (GOD) use it on Saturdays, whilst the Druid Network and the British Druid Order (BDO) instead plan their events for Sundays.

Alongside its usage as a sacred site amongst Pagans, the prehistoric monument has become a popular attraction for those holding New Age beliefs, with some visitors using dowsing rods around the site in the belief that they might be able to detect psychic emanations.

== Alexander Keiller Museum ==
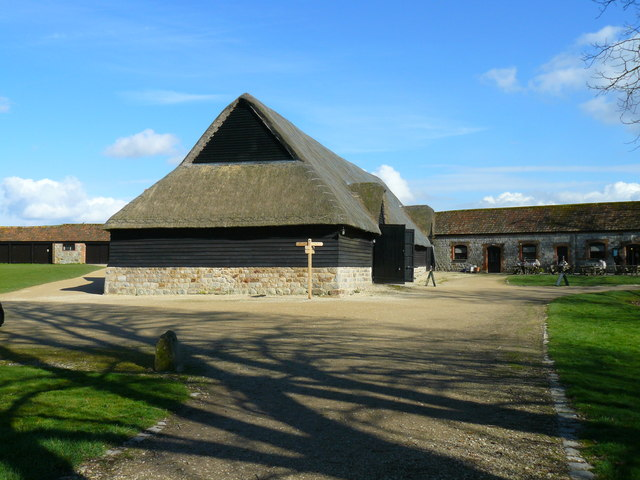
The Barn Gallery of the Alexander Keiller Museum

The Alexander Keiller Museum features prehistoric and later artefacts collected from across the Avebury landscape. As well as financing excavations at Avebury, Alexander Keiller demolished some newer structures and built the museum now bearing his name. The museum is housed in the 17th-century stables, and is operated by English Heritage and the National Trust. The nearby 17th-century threshing barn houses a permanent exhibit gallery about Avebury and its history.

The museum was first built to house Keiller's collection of artefacts from Windmill Hill and Avebury, with artefacts brought to the site from his Charles Street, London, address in 1938. The collections feature artefacts mostly of Neolithic and Early Bronze Age date, with other items from the Anglo-Saxon and later periods. The museum also features the skeleton of a child nicknamed "Charlie", found in a ditch at Windmill Hill, Avebury. The Council of British Druid Orders requested that the skeleton be re-buried in 2006, but in April 2010 the decision was made to keep it on public view. From the mid 1960s to her death in 1978, Faith Vatcher was the curator of the museum. She was heavily involved in the excavations on the western side of the henge in 1969 and in what is now the modern day visitor car park, in 1976. The museum collections are owned by the Department for Culture, Media and Sport, are managed by English Heritage and are on loan to the National Trust.

== Controversial theories ==
Various non-archaeologists as well as pseudoarchaeologists have interpreted Avebury and its neighbouring prehistoric monuments differently from academics. These interpretations have been defined by professional archaeologist Aubrey Burl as being "more phony than factual", and in many cases "entirely untenable". Such inaccurate ideas originated with William Stukeley in the late 17th century, who believed that Avebury had been built by the druids, priests of the Iron Age peoples of north-western Europe, who were persecuted by Roman invaders. Political events such as the Acts of Union 1707 and the Hanoverian succession of 1714 motivated British nationalism and Stukeley's antiquarian ideals. In the 1720s scholarly opinion was largely based on the idea that the stones were Roman works. Most believed that ancient Britons were "too unsophisticated" to construct an intricate architectural structure. Archaeologists since then have identified the monument as having been constructed two thousand years before the Iron Age, during the Neolithic.

Inigo Jones was the first to suggest that the stones were built by Romans in his book The Most Notable Antiquity of Great Britain, Vulgarly called Stone-Heng on Salisbury Plain (1665). The book consisted of architectonic designs, depicting the broken "Roman" construction. The English diarist Thomas Hearne was unsure if the stones had been built by the Romans or the ancient Britons, but Stukeley was confident that the Avebury and associated sites were much older than the Roman period.

Stukeley determined that by gathering a mass of information about all known stone circles and other archaeological sites, one could build a typology and provide an accurate understanding of prehistoric sites. He formed a typology of "Celtic" stone temples, attempting to associate the monuments with the druids. In his book, History of the Temples of the Ancient Celts, he asserted the common characteristics between all stone structures in Britain. In doing so, he wished to advance the Avebury and Stonehenge were developed by ancient inhabitants of Britain.

Stukeley most likely shared his theories with his friends within the Antiquarian Society or the Roman Knights. He was motivated in proving that the Druids had formed the stones because he could prove that ancient Britons were well-informed about science, disproving sceptics like Hearne. Stukeley was interested in proving an association with his antiquarian work and the Avebury stones to provide additional information on the holy doctrine of the Trinity. He believed that the snake illustrated on the stones represented the Messiah and the circle meant "divine," a symbol for God. In the remaining part of the trinity, wings, which were not depicted on the stones, represent the holy spirit. He concluded that the absence of wings on the pattern of stones at Avebury was because of the challenge of depicting them on stones. Terence Meaden held the theory that Neolithic inhabitants carved faces in the stones.

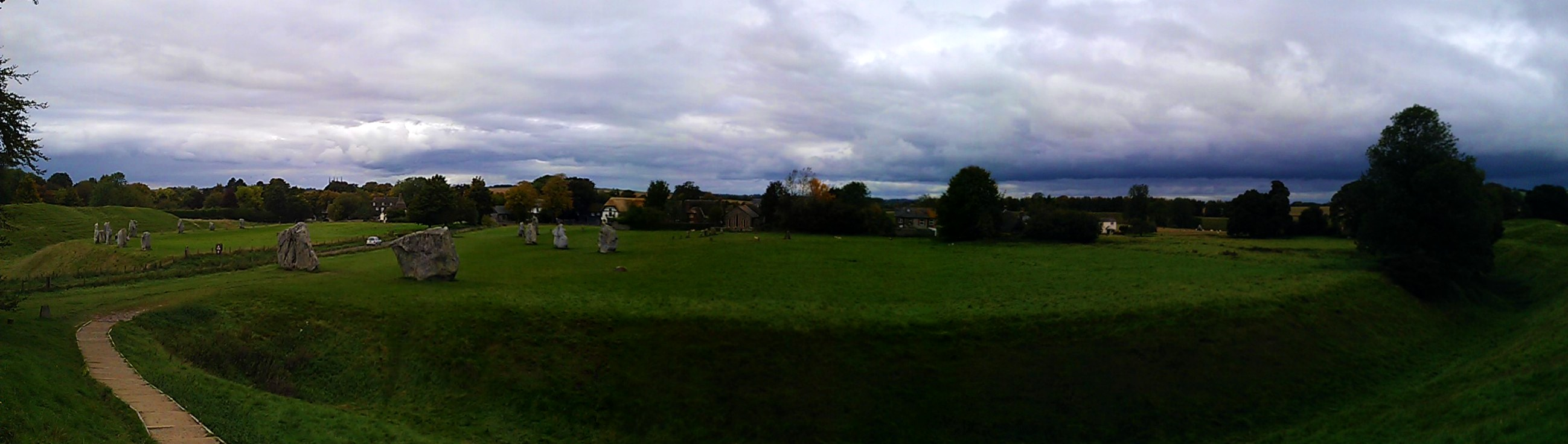
Panoramic view of the southern end of the monument

Following Stukeley, other writers produced inaccurate theories about how Avebury was built and by whom. The Reverend R. Weaver, in his The Pagan Altar (1840) argued that both Avebury and Stonehenge were built by Phoenicians, an ancient seafaring people whom many Victorian Britons believed had first brought civilisation to the island. James Fergusson disagreed, and in his Rude Stone Monuments in All Countries (1872) put forward the idea that the megalithic monument had been constructed in the Early Mediaeval period to commemorate the final battle of King Arthur, and that Arthur's slain warriors had been buried there. W. S. Blacket introduced a third idea, arguing in his Researches into the Lost Histories of America (1883) that it was Native Americans from the Appalachian Mountains who, in the ancient period crossed the Atlantic Ocean to build the great megalithic monuments of southern Britain.

The prominent modern Druid Ross Nichols, the founder of the Order of Bards, Ovates and Druids, believed that there was an astrological axis connecting Avebury to the later megalithic site at Stonehenge, and that this axis was flanked on one side by West Kennet Long Barrow, which he believed symbolised the Mother Goddess, and Silbury Hill, which he believed to be a symbol of masculinity.

Alexander Thom suggested that Avebury was constructed with a site-to-site alignment with Deneb. Researcher and author Paul Devereux deemed the monuments in the Avebury landscape to be associated with one another by "engineered sightlines" towards Silbury Hill. He believed that the terracing towards the top of the mound indicated a connection between the complex constructions in the area. Environmental evidence from buried soil under Silbury Hill showed no evidence of soil disturbance. This could signify that if the sightline Devereux suggested was used, it was very late in the landscape at Avebury.

Avebury's association with crop circles invokes the theory of ley lines. Ley lines are commonly seen as tracks on the land, intersecting at various monuments and landmarks, supposedly connecting "earth energies". They are recalled to be ancient paths that connected sacred spaces. Those who study crop circles claim that the circles are formed by extraterrestrial creatures trying to warn the world about events such as climate change or people trying to communicate from an alternate universe. Others believe in natural methods of explaining the phenomena, such as vortexes or ball lightning. There are a great number of crop circles in Wiltshire, including Stonehenge and Avebury. Crop circle season often begins at the end of May and ends by September, when the harvesting of the crops cuts away the circular patterns.

== See also ==
- Children of the Stones – a television series filmed at Avebury
- List of largest monoliths
- Megalith
- Petrosomatoglyph – symbolism of megaliths
