= Charmy =

Charmy may refer to:

- Émilie Charmy (1878–1974), artist in France's early avant-garde
- Charmy Kaur (born 1987), Indian film actress predominantly appearing in Telugu films
- Rika Ishikawa (born 1985), Japanese pop singer and TV/radio hostess
- Charmy Bee, a character in the Sonic the Hedgehog video game series
- Charmy Papittoson, a character in the manga series Black Clover

== See also ==
- Charmi (disambiguation)
- Charm (disambiguation)
- Charming (disambiguation)
- Charly (disambiguation)
- Charmila, Indian actress
