= Charmian =

Charmian or Charmion may refer to:

== People ==
- Charmian (given name), feminine given name
- Charmion (1875–1949), American vaudeville trapeze artist and strongwoman
- Charmion (servant to Cleopatra), one of Cleopatra's handmaids and confidantes, according to Plutarch
  - Charmian, the character in Shakespeare's Antony and Cleopatra
  - Charmian (Rome character), supporting character in the TV series Rome

== Other uses ==
- Charmion (skipper), a synonym of the butterfly genus Celaenorrhinus
- Charmian, Iran, a village in Hormozgan Province, Iran
- Charmian II (Motorboat), a 1915 racing express cruiser, USS Charmian II (SP-696) 1917 to 1918
- Charmian (drug), a psychedelic-related drug

== See also ==
- Charmaine (disambiguation)
- Charmin, a brand of toilet paper owned by Procter & Gamble
