= Charley Ridge =

Coordinates: 38°22′26″N 79°50′54″W

Charley Ridge is a ridge in West Virginia, in the United States.

Charley Ridge derives its name from Charles Kennison, a local pioneer.
