= Charley Creek (Clallam River tributary) =

Stream in Washington, U.S.

Coordinates: 48.2358°N 124.2593°W

Charley Creek is a stream in the U.S. state of Washington. It is a tributary of Clallam River.

Charley Creek was named after Charles Welker, a pioneer settler.

== See also ==
- List of rivers of Washington
