= Charley's Trace =

Former trail in Mississippi

Coordinates: 33.722675°N 90.315769°W

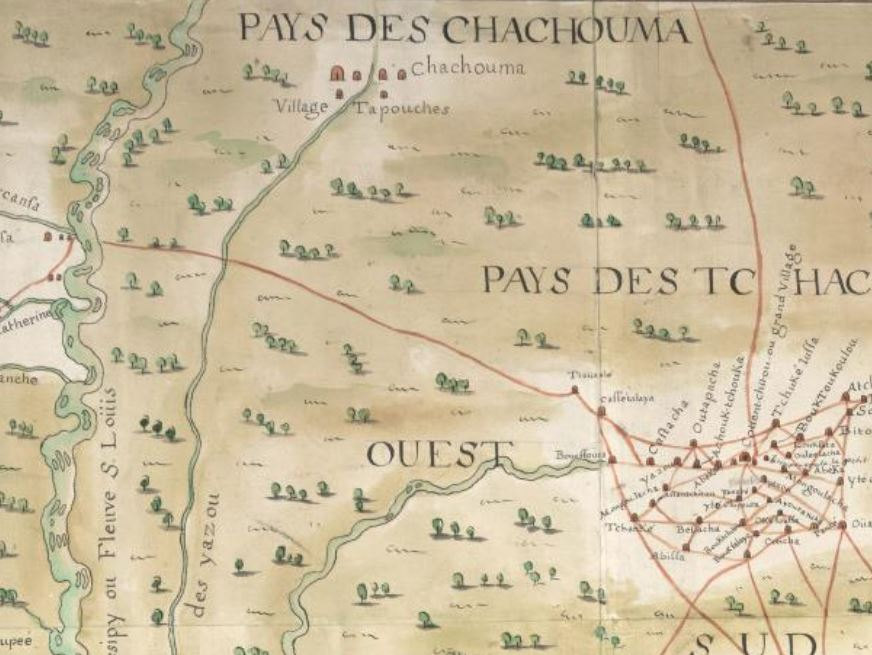
Detail of Baron de Crenay's 1733 map of Louisiana (Charley's Trace is thought to be the red line in center)

Charley's Trace is a former Native American trail to the Mississippi River.

Charley's Trace (also spelled Charlie's Trace) is possibly named for a Choctaw trader who operated a steamboat fueling station near Clarksdale in the 1820s. There is some evidence that Hernando de Soto used Charley's Trace to reach the Mississippi River on May 8, 1541. After the Mississippi Territory was open to settlement, Charley's Trace connected to other roads such as Gaines Trace and was used by outlaws who operated in the Mississippi Delta.

Charley's Trace is possibly depicted on the Baron de Crenay's 1733 map of Louisiana. The 1755 Mitchell Map may also depict Charley's Trace (labeled as "Route of Colonel Welch to the Mississippi River in 1698, since followed by our Traders").

A historical marker was placed by the Chakchiuma Chapter of the Daughters of the American Revolution on February 20, 1926. The marker was replaced with a newer one on May 21, 1955. No marker exists at the site today.
