= Charley's Automotive Service =

- U.S. National Register of Historic Places
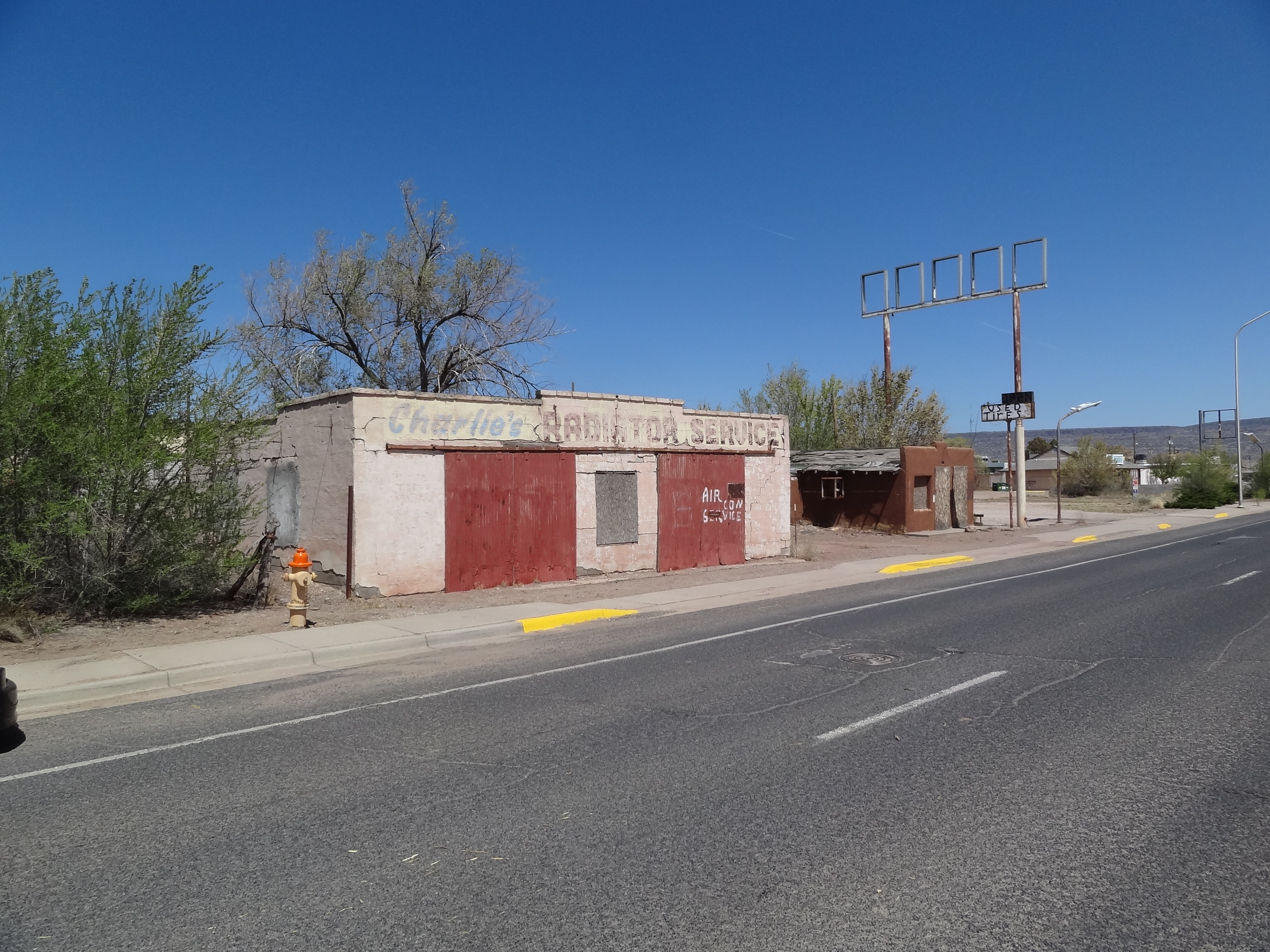

- Location within New Mexico
- Location: 1310 W. Santa Fe Ave. Grants, New Mexico
- Coordinates: 35°09′19″N 107°51′50″W
- Area: 9,999 acres (4,046 ha)
- Built: 1943
- Built by: Charley Diaz
- NRHP reference No.: 100001715
- Added to NRHP: October 4, 2017

Charley's Automotive Service, at 1310 W. Santa Fe Ave., is a roadside business and home complex on the former route of U.S. Route 66, in Grants, New Mexico. It was listed on the New Mexico State Register of Cultural Properties on February 19, 2010. It was listed on the National Register of Historic Places in 2017.

It is a set of five pumice block buildings associated with entrepreneur Charley Diaz. It includes a former automotive and radiator service, the Star Cafe, and Charley Diaz's residence, as well as few sheds and a stranded 1959 Chevrolet Bel Air, a gift from Diaz to his wife. Together these "communicate in their form and simplicity a localized expression of the independent roadside business on U.S. 66."

Alternate names include Charlie's Radiator Service and Star Cafe Drive-in.

"Charley (sometimes spelled Charlie) Diaz built the garage himself out of pumice blocks in 1943 along Santa Fe Avenue—Grants’ section of Route 66–amid a burgeoning strip of hotels, shops, and gas stations. According to the register application for the garage, Diaz later decided to specialize in two automobile components vital to New Mexico travelers–radiators and, eventually, air-conditioning systems–and, in 1949, added a small cafe for his great uncle to run. After Diaz’ death in 1995, the garage and many of the tools Diaz used, dating back to when it opened, remained in place."
