= Charmer =

Charmer or Charmers or The Charmer or the Charmers may refer to:

== Film and TV ==
- The Charmer (1917 film), American silent film
- The Charmer (1925 film), lost silent Pola Negri film
- The Charmer (1931 film), Italian comedy film directed by Guido Brignone
- The Charmer (2017 film), Danish film
- "The Charmers" (The Avengers), 1964 TV episode
- The Charmer (TV series), 1987 British television serial

== Music ==
=== Performers ===
- Lloyd Charmers (1938–2012), ska and reggae singer and musician
- Louis Farrakhan (born 1933), performed as a calypso singer "The Charmer"
- Charmer (band)

=== Albums ===
- Charmer (Tigers Jaw album), 2014
- Charmer (Aimee Mann album), 2012
- Charmer, a 2015 album by Claptone
- Charmer, the 2018 self-titled debut album by Charmer

=== Songs ===
- "Charmer" (Strawbs song), 1976
- "Charmer" (Kings of Leon song), 2007
- "Charmer" (N-Dubz song), 2022

== Other uses ==
- Charmer (folklore), English practitioners of a specific kind of folk magic
- Charmers, comic strip by Hallmark Cards (1975–1981)

== See also ==
- Charm (disambiguation)
- Snake charmer (disambiguation)
