= Charmed (disambiguation) =

Charmed is a 1998–2006 American fantasy drama TV series.

Charmed may also refer to:

== Arts and entertainment ==
=== Film, television and gaming ===
- Charmed (2018 TV series), a television series reboot from The CW
- Charmed (video game), based on the fourth season of the 1998 TV series
- Charmed, I'm Sure, a 1909 silent film directed by Charles K. French

=== Music ===
- Charmed: The Soundtrack (2005), the first soundtrack album of the 1998 TV series
- Charmed: The Book of Shadows (2005), the second soundtrack album of the 1998 TV series
- Charmed (group), a Norwegian girl band
- Charmed, album by DJ Sabrina the Teenage DJ

=== Other uses in arts and entertainment ===
- Charmed (comics), a licensed comic book continuation of the 1998 television series
- Charmed board games, several official board game adaptations of the 1998 television series
- Charmed merchandise, a list of merchandise for the 1998 television series

== Science ==
- Charm quark, or charmed quark, a subatomic particle

== See also ==
- Charm (disambiguation)
