= Charmian, Iran =

Charmian چرميان
- Village
- Location within Iran
- Coordinates: 27°45′42″N 57°09′38″E
- Country: Iran
- Province: Hormozgan
- County: Rudan
- Bakhsh: Rudkhaneh
- Rural District: Mosaferabad

Population (2006)
  - Total: 24
- Time zone: UTC+3:30 (IRST)
  - Summer (DST): UTC+4:30 (IRDT)

Charmian (Persian: چرميان, also Romanized as Charmīān and Charmeyān) is a village in Mosaferabad Rural District, Rudkhaneh District, Rudan County, Hormozgan Province, Iran. At the 2006 census, its population was 24, in 7 families.
