= Charlie (skeleton) =

Neolithic skeleton

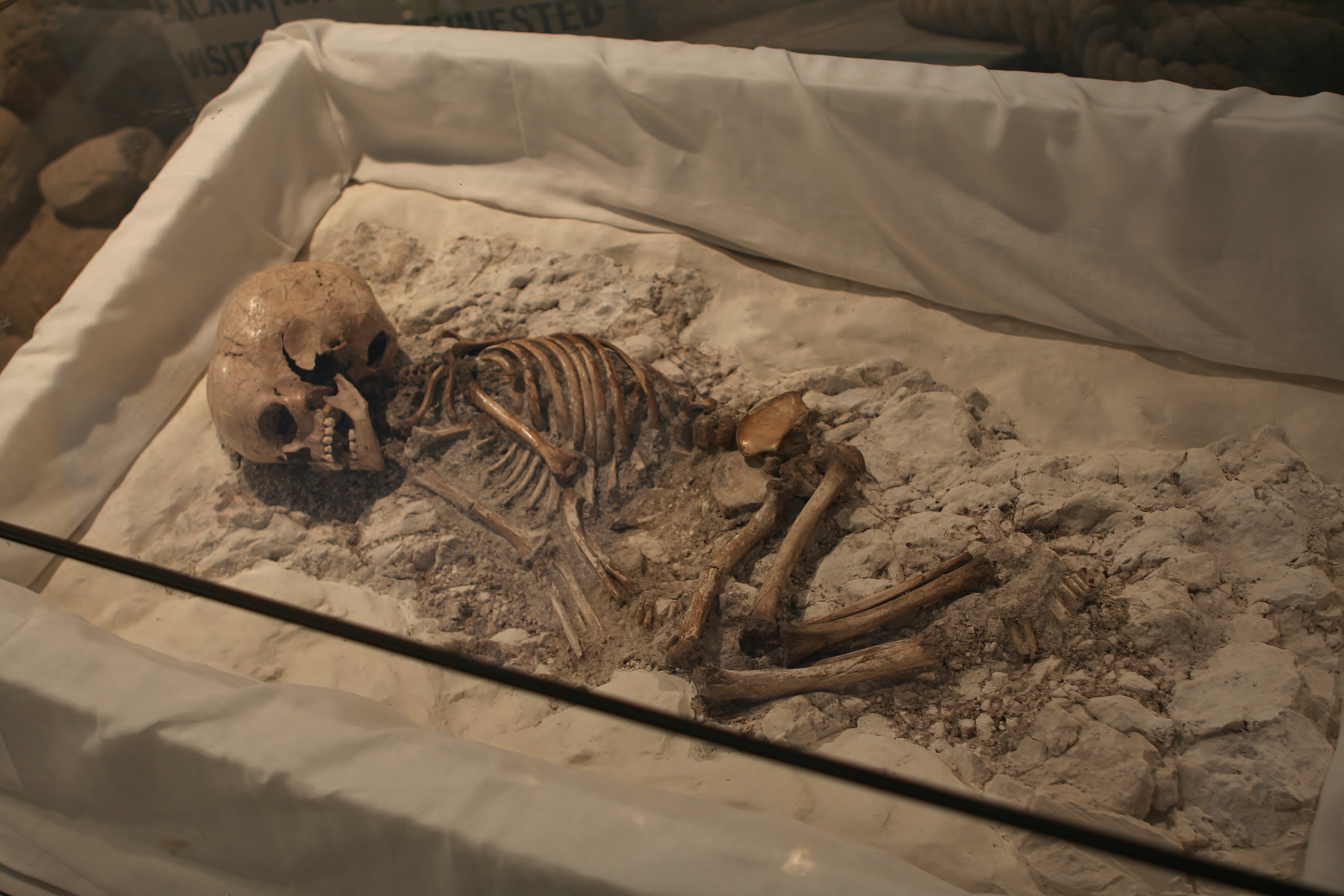
- Born: c. 3703 BC
- Died: c. 3700 BC (aged c. 3) now Avebury, England, United Kingdom
- Body discovered: 1929 by Alexander Keiller
- Resting place: Avebury, England, United Kingdom

Charlie (c. 3703 BC - c. 3700 BC) is the name given to a Neolithic skeleton of a three-year-old child found near the ancient stone circle of Avebury, Wiltshire, England. Charlie was excavated from Windmill Hill, Avebury in the 1920s and is currently on display at the Alexander Keiller Museum at Avebury.

There is controversy surrounding the display of the skeleton. The Council of British Druid Orders (CoBDO) demanded that the skeleton be reburied where it was found, or as near as is practically possible, claiming that putting a skeleton in a museum as an attraction is disrespectful. Some archeologists have opposed reburying the skeleton, claiming that it could set a precedent for the reburying of other human remains in museums. Historians have also argued that Charlie's skeleton should be kept in a museum to be available for research. English Heritage and The National Trust held a public consultation on the future of Charlie; in April 2010 the decision was made to keep the skeleton on public view.
