= Charlie (2015 soundtrack) =

Soundtrack album by Gopi Sundar
- Released: 7 December 2015
- Recorded: 2015
- Studios: Sound Factory, Cochin
- Genre: Feature film soundtrack
- Length: 36:25
- Language: Malayalam
- Label: Muzik 247
- Producer: Gopi Sundar

Gopi Sundar chronology
Ennu Ninte Moideen (2015)	Charlie (2015)	Two Countries (2015)

Charlie is the soundtrack to the 2015 Malayalam film of the same name directed by Martin Prakkat starring Dulquer Salmaan, Parvathy Thiruvothu and Aparna Gopinath. The soundtrack featured eight songs composed by Gopi Sundar with lyrics written by Rafeeq Ahamed and Santhosh Varma. Six of them were released as an album on 7 December 2015 through Muzik 247 label, while two of the songs—"Chithirathira" and "Chundari Penne" (which was sung by Salmaan)—released separately.

== Development ==
Sunder previously collaborated with Prakkat on ABCD: American-Born Confused Desi (2013) that also starred Salmaan. He suggested a new soundscape for the film, as it would target youthful audience and the songs needed to grow with them. For the opening song "Akale", Prakkat suggested around several singers before finalising Malgudi Subha, who returned to playback singing for Malayalam films after Thenmavin Kombath (1994).

== Track listing ==
No.	Title	Lyrics	Singer(s)	Length
1.	"Akale"	Rafeeq Ahammed	Malgudi Shubha	4:02
2.	"Pularikalo"	Rafeeq Ahammed	Shakthisree Gopalan, Mohammed Maqbool Mansoor	5:49
3.	"Puthumazhayai" (Version 1)	Rafeeq Ahammed	Shreya Ghoshal	4:34
4.	"Oru Kari Mukilinu"	Rafeeq Ahammed	Vijay Prakash	4:42
5.	"Sneham Nee Naadha"	Rafeeq Ahammed	Rajalakshmi	4:06
6.	"Puthumazhayai" (Version 2)	Rafeeq Ahammed	Divya S. Menon	4:35
7.	"Chithirathira"	Santhosh Varma	Vijay Yesudas	4:40
8.	"Chundari Penne"	Santhosh Varma	Dulquer Salmaan	3:57
Total length:				36:25

== Reception ==
Nelson K. Paul of Malayala Manorama wrote "Gopi Sunder continues his top form with the album of Charlie". Karthik Srinivasan of Milliblog summarised "Gopi Sundar delivers again, unsurprisingly, given his scintillating form." Vipin Nair of Music Aloud praised Charlie as the "best soundtrack ever heard" from Sunder and rated 8 out of 10 to the album. Vishnu Varma of The Indian Express wrote "A melodious background score from Gopi Sunder blends in well".

== Accolades ==
Award	Date of ceremony (Note: Date is linked to the article about the awards held that year, wherever possible.)	Category	Recipient(s)	Result	Ref.
Asiavision Awards	18 November 2016	Best Music Director	Gopi Sundar (Note: Shared with Kali and Pulimurugan (both 2016))	Won	
Filmfare Awards South	18 June 2016	Best Music Director – Malayalam	Gopi Sundar	Nominated	
Filmfare Awards South	18 June 2016	Best Lyricist – Malayalam	Rafeeq Ahamed ("Oru Kari Mukilinu")	Nominated	
IIFA Utsavam	28—29 March 2017	Best Music Director – Malayalam	Gopi Sundar	Won	
IIFA Utsavam	28—29 March 2017	Best Lyricist – Malayalam	Santhosh Varma ("Chundari Penne")	Won	
IIFA Utsavam	28—29 March 2017	Best Male Playback Singer – Malayalam	Dulquer Salmaan ("Chundari Penne")	Nominated	
IIFA Utsavam	28—29 March 2017	Best Female Playback Singer – Malayalam	Shreya Ghoshal ("Puthumazhayai")	Nominated	
Mirchi Music Awards South	27 July 2016	Album of the Year	Charlie Gopi Sundar	Won	
Mirchi Music Awards South	27 July 2016	Listeners Choice Album of the Year	Charlie Gopi Sundar	Won	
Mirchi Music Awards South	27 July 2016	Music Composer of the Year	Gopi Sundar ("Oru Kari Mukilinu")	Nominated	
Mirchi Music Awards South	27 July 2016	Lyricist of the Year	Rafeeq Ahamed ("Oru Kari Mukilinu")	Won	
Mirchi Music Awards South	27 July 2016	Male Vocalist of the Year	Vijay Prakash ("Oru Kari Mukilinu")	Won	
Mirchi Music Awards South	27 July 2016	Female Vocalist of the Year	Shreya Ghoshal ("Puthumazhayai")	Nominated	
Mirchi Music Awards South	27 July 2016	Song of the Year	"Oru Kari Mukilinu"	Nominated	
North American Film Awards	24 July 2016	Best Music Director	Gopi Sundar	Won	
North American Film Awards	24 July 2016	Best Female Playback Singer	Divya S. Menon ("Puthumazhayai")	Won	
South Indian International Movie Awards	30 June – 1 July 2016	Best Male Playback Singer – Malayalam	Dulquer Salmaan ("Chundari Penne")	Nominated	
South Indian International Movie Awards	30 June – 1 July 2016	Best Female Playback Singer – Malayalam	Shakthisree Gopalan ("Pularikalo")	Nominated	
