= Dutch Charley Creek =

Stream in Minnesota, U.S.

Coordinates: 44°12′58″N 95°16′41″W

Dutch Charley Creek is a stream in the U.S. state of Minnesota. The creek was named for Charles Zierke, a pioneer who settled there.

== See also ==
- List of rivers of Minnesota
