= Lucky charm =

A good luck charm or lucky charm is an item that is believed to bring luck.

Lucky charm may also refer to:

== Arts, entertainment, and media ==
- Lucky Charm (album), 1994 album by The Black Sorrows
- "Lucky Charm" (song), 1989 song by The Boys
- "Lucky Charm", a song by The Apples in Stereo from Fun Trick Noisemaker
- "Lucky Charm", a song by The Isley Brothers from Body Kiss
- "Lucky Charm", a 1972 song by Steve Peregrin Took from the 1995 posthumous album The Missing Link To Tyrannosaurus Rex
- Lucky Charm (film), 2008 Indian Hindi film directed by Aziz Mirza
- Lucky Charm (novel), 2006 novel in the Beacon Street Girls series by Annie Bryant
- "Lucky Charm" (Care Bears episode)
- "Lucky Charm" (The Fresh Prince of Bel-Air), a 1991 television episode

== Other uses ==
- Lucky Charms, a cereal

== See also ==
- Amulet, a close cousin of the talisman, consists of any object intended to bring good luck and/or protection to its owner
- List of lucky symbols
- Touch piece
