= Charlie (given name) =

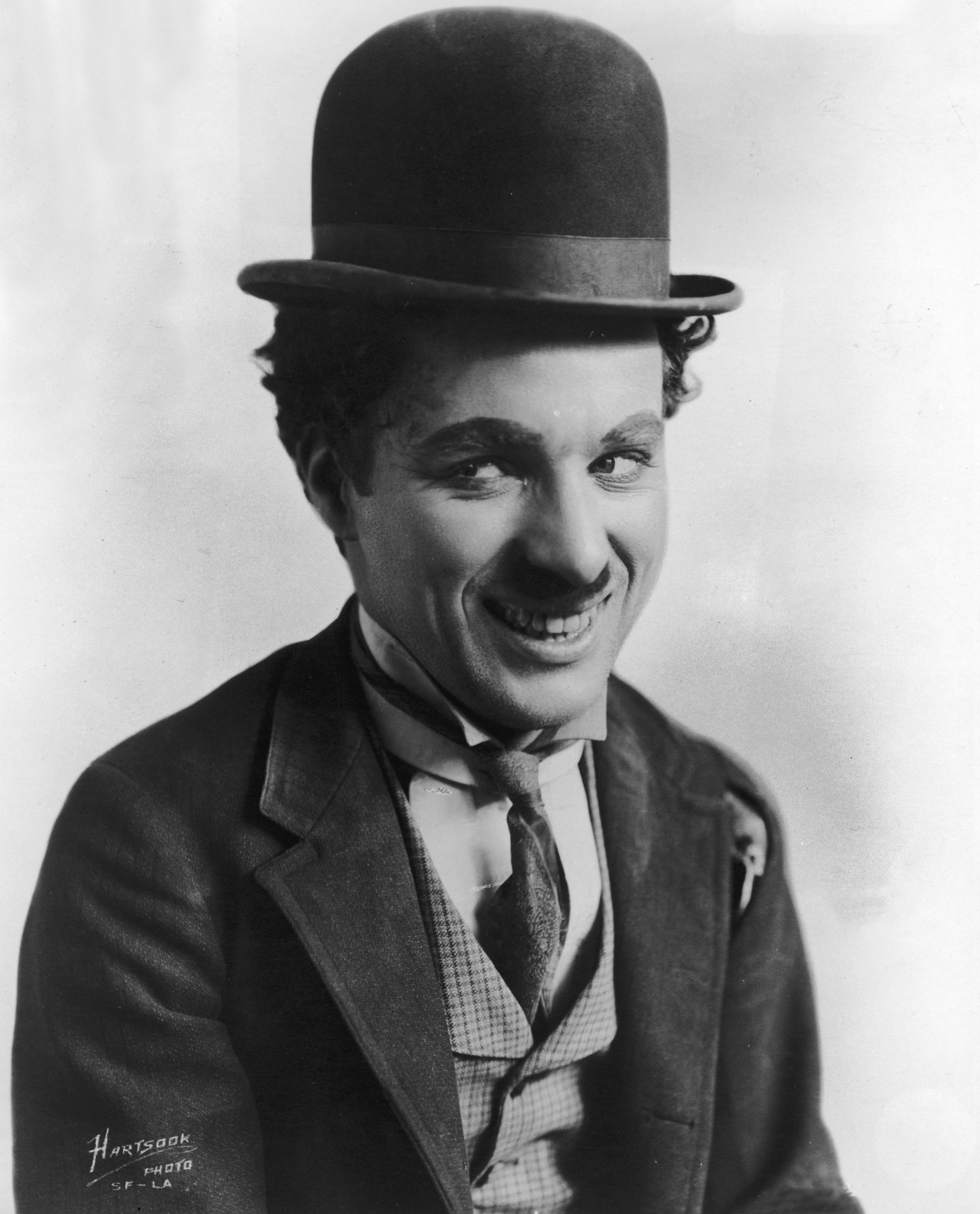
- Charlie Chaplin in 1915
- Gender: Unisex
- Language: English

Origin
- Languages: Germanic, French, English
- Origin: 1. Charles; 2. Charlotte; 3. Charlotta; 4. Charlize; 5. Charlene
- Region of origin: England

Other names
- Variant forms: Charley; Charly; Charli; Charlee; Charleigh
- Related names: Charles, Charlotte, Charlotta, Charlize, Charlene, Charlton

Charlie is a traditionally masculine given name in English-speaking countries, often a nickname for Charles, but is now used as a unisex name. It is also used as a surname.

For girls, Charlie acts either as a nickname for Charlotta, Charlotte, Charlize, or Charlene, or sometimes on its own. The different forms of spelling are most commonly used for the feminine forms. These spelling variants include Charlee, Charli, Charly, and Charleigh. Charley is another spelling variant for any gender.

== Given names ==
- Charlie (goat), animal actor
- Charlie Adam (born 1985), Scottish professional footballer
- Charlie Adelson (born 1976), American convicted murderer
- Charlie Adler (born 1956), American voice actor
- Charlie Albright (born 1992), American classical pianist
- Charlie Ane Jr. (1931–2007), American football center
- Charlie Ane III (born 1952), American football center and head coach
- Charlie Austin (born 1989), English footballer
- Charlie Baker (born 1956), American businessman and politician
- Charlie Balducci (1975–2020), American actor
- Charlie Barnet (1913–1991), American jazz saxophonist, composer, and bandleader
- Charlie Barnett (disambiguation), multiple people
- Charlie Barley (1986–2010), Canadian thoroughbred racehorse
- Charlie Blackmon (born 1986), American baseball player
- Charlie Brennan (born 2005), Jersey cricketer
- Charlie Brooker (born 1971), British journalist, television presenter and writer
- Charlie Brooks (born 1981), British actress
- Charlie Cawood (born 1988), English musician
- Charlie Chaplin (1889–1977), British actor, filmmaker and composer
- Charlie Clare (born 1991), English rugby union player
- Charlie Cole (photographer) (1955–2019), American photojournalist, known for his photo of the Tank Man during the Tiananmen Square protests of 1989
- Charlie Collins (disambiguation), several people
- Charlie Crist (born 1956), American politician and lawyer
- Charlie Crofts (Māori leader) (1943–2024), New Zealand leader of the Ngāi Tahu iwi
- Charlie Clements (born 1987), British actor
- Charlie Cook (born 1953), American reporter
- Charlie Covell (born 1984), British actress, writer and producer
- Charlie Cox (born 1982), English actor
- Charlie Coyle (born 1993), American Hockey Player
- Charlie Daniels (1936–2020), American singer, musician and songwriter
- Charlie Daniels (disambiguation), multiple people
- Charlie Davao (1934–2010), Filipino film actor
- Charlie Davidson (born 1972), American football player
- Charlie Davies-Carr (born 2006), main subject of the viral video "Charlie Bit My Finger"
- Charlie Day (born 1976), American actor
- Charlie Dimmock (born 1966), English gardener
- Charlie Dixon (disambiguation), multiple people
- Charlie Dizon (born 1996), Filipina actress
- Charlie Ferguson (disambiguation), multiple people
- Charlie Gallagher (footballer, born 1940) (1940–2021), Irish football player
- Charlie Gallagher (Gaelic footballer) (1937–1989), Gaelic football player
- Charlie George (born 1950), English footballer
- Charlie George (comedian) (fl. 2020s), British comedian
- Charlie Gray (1864–1900), American baseball player
- Charlie Haas (born 1972), American professional wrestler
- Charlie Hall (disambiguation), multiple people
- Charlie Harris (disambiguation), multiple people
- Charlie Heck (born 1996), American football player
- Charlie Hickman (1876–1934), American baseball player
- Charlie Hides (born 1964), American drag queen and comedian
- Charlie Hunnam (born 1980), English actor
- Charlie Jackson (American football coach) (born 1976), American football coach
- Charlie Jackson (defensive back) (1936–2021), American football player
- Charlie Kelly (businessman) (born 1945), American businessman and mountain bike pioneer
- Charlie Kelly (baseball) (1862–1940), American baseball player
- Charlie Kendall (born 1935), American football player
- Charles King (disambiguation), multiple people
- Charlie Kirk (1993–2025), American right-wing activist
- Charlie Lim (born 1988), Singaporean musician
- Charlie Manuel (born 1944), American baseball coach
- Charlie McCoy (born 1941), American musician
- Charlie McDermott (born 1990), American television actor
- Charlie McGeoghegan (born 1974), Canadian politician
- Charlie Mickel (born 2004), American freestyle skier
- Charlie Miller (hairdresser) (1944–2025), Scottish hairdresser
- Charlie Mills (harness racer) (1888–1972), German racer
- Charlie Moore (disambiguation), multiple people
- Charlie Mullins (born 1952), British businessman, founder of Pimlico Plumbers
- Charlie Murphy (actor) (1959–2017), American comedian
- Charlie Norris (footballer) (1881–1940), Australian footballer
- Charlie Pabor (1846–1914), American baseball player
- Charlie Parker (1920–1955), American jazz saxophonist and composer
- Charlie Patino (born 2003), English footballer
- Charlie Pickering, (born 1977), Australian comedian
- Charlie Puth (born 1991), American singer and songwriter
- Charlie Rangel (1930–2025), American politician
- Charlie Reid (disambiguation), multiple people
- Charlie Reiter (born 1988), American footballer
- Charlie Rich (1932–1995), American singer
- Charlie Ritter (1868–1958), American baseball player
- Charlie Rose (born 1942), American television journalist
- Charlie Phil Rosenberg ("Charles Green") (1902–1976), American boxer
- Charlie Schofield (born 1993), English professional boxer
- Charlie Sheen (born 1965), American actor
- Charlie Simpson (born 1985), British singer-songwriter
- Charlie Stewart (Scottish footballer), Scottish footballer
- Charlie Storwick (born 1998), Canadian singer
- Charlie Stubbs (American football) (born 1955), American football coach
- Charlie Stubbs (footballer) (1920–1984), English footballer
- Charlie Swan (horse racing) (born 1968), Irish jockey
- Charlie Sloth (born 1981), British DJ
- Charlie Stephens (born 1981), Canadian ice hockey player
- Charlie Suff, English actor
- Charlie Taumoepeau (born 1997), American football player
- Charlie Trairat (born 1993), Thai actor and singer
- Charlie Tuna (1944–2016), American radio and television personality
- Charlie Valencia (born 1974), American martial artist
- Charlie Valerio (born 1990), Dominican baseball player
- Charlie Vandergaw (1938–2025), American who lived with bears in Alaska
- Charlie Vaude (1882–1942), Australian stage comedian
- Charlie Vaughan (baseball) (born 1947), American baseball player
- Charlie Vaughan (footballer) (1921–1989), English footballer
- Charlie Vázquez (born 1971), American musician
- Charlie Venegas (born 1967), American speedway rider
- Charlie Ventura (1916–1992), American saxophonist and bandleader
- Charlie Vergos (1925–2010), American restaurateur
- Charlie Vernon (born 1987), Armagh Gaelic footballer
- Charlie Vest (born 1974), American racing driver
- Charlie Vickers (born 1992), Australian actor
- Charlie Vig, Shakopee Mdewakanton Sioux leader
- Charlie Vignoles, Anglo-Argentine cricketer
- Charlie Villani (born 1963), Australian soccer player
- Charlie Villanueva (born 1984), American basketball player
- Charlie Vinson (born 1944), American baseball player
- Charlie Garcia Vitug, Filipino film and television producer
- Charlie Volker (born 1997), American bobsledder and football player
- Charlie Wabo (born 1984), PNG international rugby league footballer
- Charlie Wachtel, American director, producer and screenwriter
- Charlie Wade (American football) (born 1950), American football player
- Charlie Wade (born 1963), American volleyball coach
- Charlie Wagner (1912–2006), American baseball player
- Charlie Waite (born 1949), English photographer
- Charlie Waitt (1853–1912), American baseball player
- Charlie Wakefield (footballer, born 1998), English footballer
- Charlie Wakefield (footballer, born 2000), English footballer
- Charlie Wakim (born 1991), Australian cricketer
- Charlie Walk (born 1968), American music executive and entrepreneur
- Charlie Walker-Blair (born 1988), English rugby union player
- Charlie Walker (musician) (1926–2008), American country singer-songwriter
- Charlie Walker (rugby union) (born 1992), English rugby union player
- Charlie Walker (footballer, born 1911) (1911–1990), English footballer
- Charlie Walker (Australian cricketer) (1909–1942), Australian cricketer
- Charlie Walker (footballer, born 1990), British association football player
- Charlie Walker (English cricketer) (born 1992), English cricketer
- Charlie Wall-Andrews, Canadian academic and music industry executive
- Charlie Wall (1880–1955), American businessman and mobster
- Charlie Wallace (1885–1970), English footballer
- Charlie Wallace (basketball) (1948–2023), American basketball player
- Charlie Waller (American musician) (1935–2004), American singer and guitarist
- Charlie Waller (American football) (1921–2009), American football coach
- Charlie Waller (footballer) (born 2005), English footballer
- Charlie Wallis (cricketer) (born 1991), English cricketer
- Charlie Walsh (cyclist) (born 1941), Australian Head Cycling Coach - Track & Road
- Charlie Walsh (footballer) (1910–1954), English footballer
- Charlie Walters (1897–1971), English footballer
- Charlie Walton (1947–2025), American politician
- Charlie Wanhope (1934–2016), Australian rules footballer
- Charlie Ward (born 1970), American basketball and football player
- Charlie Ward (golfer) (1911–2001), English golfer
- Charlie Ward (footballer) (born 1995), English footballer
- Charlie Ward (fighter) (born 1980), Irish mixed martial arts fighter
- Charlie Ward (content creator) (born 1960), British right-wing content creator
- Charlie Warde (born 1974), British painter
- Charlie Ware (hurler, born 1933) (1933–2013), Irish hurler
- Charlie Ware (Baker County, Georgia) (1914–1999), Shooting victim
- Charlie Ware (footballer) (1931–2017), English footballer
- Charlie Warren (cricketer) (born 1979), Irish cricketer
- Charlie Wassmer (born 1991), English footballer
- Charlie Waters (born 1948), American football player
- Charlie Watkins (footballer) (1921–1998), Scottish footballer and manager
- Charlie Watkins (sound engineer) (1923–2014), British audio engineer
- Charlie Watt (born 1944), Canadian politician
- Charlie Watts (1941–2021), British drummer
- Charlie Watts (fascist) (1903–1971), Member of the British Union of Fascists who was interned during the Second World War
- Charlie Watts (footballer) (1870–1924), English footballer
- Charlie Watts (baseball), American baseball player
- Charlie Wayman (1922–2006), English footballer
- Charlie Weatherbie (born 1955), American football player and coach
- Charlie Weaver (born 1949), American football player
- Charlie Weaver (politician) (born 1957), American politician
- Charlie Webb (1886–1973), English footballer and manager
- Charlie Weber (actor) (born 1978), American actor and former model
- Charlie Weber (baseball) (1868–1914), American baseball player
- Charlie Weberg (born 1998), Swedish footballer
- Charlie Webster (broadcaster) (born 1982), British broadcaster and campaigner
- Charlie Webster (politician), American politician
- Charlie Webster (footballer) (born 2004), English footballer
- Charlie Wedemeyer (1946–2010), American teacher and football coach
- Charlie Wehan (born 1998), American soccer player
- Charlie Weimers (born 1982), Swedish politician
- Charlie Weir (1956–1992), South African boxer
- Charlie Weis (born 1956), American football coach
- Charlie Weis Jr. (born 1993), American football coach
- Charlie Wellens (born 2002), English footballer
- Charlie Wellings (born 1998), English association football player
- Charlie Wells (footballer) (1892–1929), Australian football player
- Charlie Wells (writer) (1923–2004), American crime novelist
- Charlie Wernham (born 1994), English actor and comedian
- Charlie West (American football) (born 1946), American football player and coach
- Charlie West (footballer, born 1884) (1884–1962), Australian rules footballer
- Charlie West (footballer, born 2006) (born 2006), Australian rules footballer
- Charlie Westbrook (born 1989), American basketball player
- Charlie Weston (born 2004), English footballer
- Charlie Wheatley (1893–1982), American baseball player and businessman
- Charlie Whelan (born 1954), British political advisor
- Charlie Whitaker (born 2003), English footballer
- Charlie Whitchurch (1920–1988), English footballer
- Charlie White (figure skater) (born 1987), American ice dancer
- Charlie White (artist) (born 1972), American artist and academic
- Charlie White (rugby union) (1874–1941), Australian rugby union player
- Charlie White (footballer) (1889–1925), English footballer
- Charlie White (baseball) (1927-1998), American baseball player
- Charlie Whitehead (footballer) (1899–1972), Australian rules footballer
- Charlie Whitehead (singer) (1942–2015), American singer
- Charlie Whitehouse (1894–1960), American baseball player
- Charlie Whitehurst (born 1982), American football player
- Charlie Whitely (1904–1953), Australian rules footballer
- Charlie Whiting (1952–2019), Formula One race director
- Charlie Wi (born 1972), South Korean golfer
- Charlie Wiedemeyer (1914–1979), American baseball player
- Charlie Wiggins (1897–1979), African-American auto racing driver and mechanic
- Charlie Wilkinson (footballer) (1907–1975), English footballer
- Charlie Williams (comedian) (1927–2006), English footballer and comedian
- Charlie Williams (footballer, born 1873) (1873–1952), English footballer and manager
- Charlie Williams (American football) (born 1972), American football player
- Charlie Williams (pool player) (born 1977), American pool player and promoter
- Charlie Williams (umpire) (1943–2005), American baseball umpire
- Charlie Williams (basketball) (born 1943), American basketball player
- Charlie Williams (British writer) (born 1971), English writer
- Charlie Williams (motorcyclist), British motorcycle racer
- Charlie Williams (pitcher) (1947–2015), American baseball player
- Charlie Williams (shortstop) (1903–1931), American baseball player
- Charlie Williams (footballer, born 1944) (1944–2026), Maltese footballer
- Charlie Williamson (footballer, born 1956), Scottish footballer
- Charlie Williamson (footballer, born 1962), English footballer
- Charlie Wilson (Texas politician) (1933–2010), American politician
- Charlie Wilson (Ohio politician) (1943–2013), American businessman and politician
- Charlie Wilson (singer) (born 1953), American singer
- Charlie Wilson (footballer, born 1895), English footballer
- Charlie Wilson (footballer, born 1905), English footballer
- Charlie Wilson (baseball) (1905–1970), American baseball player
- Charlie Wilson (criminal) (1932–1990), English career criminal
- Charlie Wilson (footballer, born 1877) (1877–?), English footballer
- Charlie Wilson (footballer, born 1904) (1904–1994), English footballer
- Charlie Wilson (Burnley footballer) (fl. 1945–1946), English footballer
- Charlie Winfield (born 2002), English footballer
- Charlie Winslade (1931–1993), GB & Wales international rugby league footballer
- Charlie Winston (born 1978), English singer-songwriter
- Charlie Winton, American publisher
- Charlie Wipfler (1915–1983), English footballer
- Charlie Wise (1950–2003), American interrogator & torturer
- Charlie Withers (1922–2005), English footballer
- Charlie Woerner (born 1997), American football player
- Charlie Wolf, British-American disc jockey and political commentator
- Charlie Wolfe (1892–1966), Australian rules footballer
- Charlie Wood (footballer) (born 2002), English footballer
- Charlie Wood (musician), American musician
- Charlie Woodhead (1885–1970), Australian rugby league footballer
- Charlie Woodruff (1884–1943), English footballer
- Charlie Woods (footballer) (born 1941), English footballer
- Charlie Woods (born 2009), American golfer
- Charlie Wooldridge (1897–1982), American baseball player
- Charlie Woollett (1920–2011), English footballer
- Charlie Woollum (born 1940), Head coach of Bucknell Bison men's basketball team
- Charlie Worsham (born 1985), American singer and songwriter
- Charlie Wrack (1899–1979), English footballer
- Charlie Wright (1938–2024), Scottish footballer
- Charlie Wright (Kent cricketer) (1895–1959), English cricketer
- Charlie Wyke (born 1992), English footballer
- Charlie Wyse (born 1940), Canadian politician and educator
- Charlie Yates (1913–2005), American golfer
- Charlie Houng On Yee (1905–1996), Chinese-Australian businessman
- Charlie Yelverton (born 1948), American basketball player
- Charlie Yeung (born 1974), Taiwan-born Hong Kong actress
- Charlie Yingling (1865–1897), American baseball player
- Charlie York (1882–1955), Scottish footballer
- Charlie Young (baseball) (1893–1952), American baseball player
- Charlie Young (footballer, born 1877) (1877–1914), Australian rules footballer
- Charlie Young (footballer, born 1918) (1918–1969), Australian rules footballer
- Charlie Zaa (born 1974), Colombian musician
- Charlie Zahm, American singer
- Charlie Zeleny, American drummer
- Charlie Ziegler (1875–1904), American baseball player
- Charlie Zimmerman (American football) (1904–1954), American football coach
- Charlie Zink (born 1979), American baseball player
- Charlie Zinnick (1896–1967), Australian rules footballer
- Charlie Zunker (1908–1963), American football player

== Pseudonyms and nicknames ==
- Chainsaw Charlie, later stage name for professional wrestler Terry Funk
- Charle (born 1960), Indian actor, also known as Charlie
- Charlie (Hungarian singer) (born 1947), Hungarian rock and soul singer born Károly Horváth in 1947
- Charlie (skeleton), a Neolithic skeleton discovered in England
- Charlie Chop-off, unidentified American serial killer
- Charlie Scene, pseudonym of Jordon Terrell from the band Hollywood Undead
- MoistCr1tikal (Charles White, born 1994), an American YouTuber and Twitch streamer sometimes simply known as Charlie
- Noor Mohammed Charlie or Charlie (1911–1983), comedian in Indian films
- Charles Edward Stuart, referred to as Bonnie Prince Charlie (1720-1788), Jacobite pretender to the thrones of England, Scotland and Ireland

== Surname ==
- Alister Charlie (born 1977 or 1978), Guyanese politician
- Arizona Charlie (1859–1932), American showman
- Dawson Charlie (c. 1865 – 1908), Canadian First Nations person, a co-discoverer of the gold that triggered the Klondike Gold Rush
- Noor Mohammed Charlie (1911–1983), comedian in Indian films

== Fictional characters ==
- Charlie (Legends of Tomorrow), from Legends of Tomorrow.
- Charlie (The Simpsons), on the TV series The Simpsons
- Charlie (Street Fighter), in the Street Fighter video games
- Charlie the Tuna, the cartoon mascot for StarKist Tuna
- Charlie the Unicorn, in a short film and viral video
- Charlie Andrews (Heroes), on the television series Heroes
- Charlie Babbitt, in the 1988 film Rain Man.
- Charlie Banks (Ghost Whisperer), from the Ghost Whisperer
- Charlie Bradbury, from the TV show Supernatural
- Charlie Brown, the lead character in the Peanuts comic strip
- Charlie Buckton, from the Australian soap opera Home and Away.
- Charlie Bucket, a character from Charlie and the Chocolate Factory.
- Charlie Chan, a Chinese-American detective created by Earl Derr Biggers
- Charlie Cotton, from the British soap opera EastEnders
- Charlie Cotton (2014 character), from the British soap opera EastEnders
- Charlie Cutter, from the video game Uncharted
- Charlie Dalton, from the movie Dead Poets Society, also known as "Nuwanda"
- Charlie Eppes, from the TV series Numb3rs
- Charlie Harper (Two and a Half Men), from the TV series Two and a Half Men
- Charlie Kelly (Fair City), from the Irish soap opera Fair City
- Charlie Kelly (character), from the TV series It's Always Sunny in Philadelphia
- Charlie Morningstar, a character from Hazbin Hotel
- Charlie McGee (Firestarter), in Stephen King's novel Firestarter
- Charlie Pace, from the TV series Lost
- Charlie Peace (comics) in the British comic strip
- Charlie Spring, in the novel Heartstopper
- Charlie Stubbs (Coronation Street), from the British soap opera Coronation Street
- Charlie Swan (Twilight), in the novel series Twilight
- Charlie Townsend, fictional unseen character on the Charlie's Angels television and motion picture series

== See also ==
- Charlie (disambiguation)
- Carlie
- Charlin (name)
