= Chubin =

Chubin may refer to:

== Places ==
- Chubin, Chaharmahal and Bakhtiari, a village in Iran
- Chubin, Qazvin, a village in Iran
- Chubin, Razavi Khorasan, a village in Iran
- Chubin Dar, a village in Iran

== Other uses ==
- Chubin (surname)

== See also ==
- Zubin
