= Charles Harris =

Charles, Charlie, or Chuck Harris may refer to:

== Arts and entertainment ==
- Charles K. Harris (1867–1930), American songwriter
- Charles Harris (photographer) (1908–1998), American photographer
- Charlie Harris (musician) (fl. 1940s), American jazz double-bassist
- Charles Harris (painter), British painter, art instructor and teacher
- Charles "Dill" Baker Harris, character in the Harper Lee novel To Kill a Mockingbird

== Military ==
- Charles L. Harris (general) (1834–1910), Union Army general
- Sir Charles Harris (civil servant) (1864–1943), civil servant in the British War Office
- Charles Harris (Royal Navy officer) (1887–1957), British admiral
- Charles A. "Bucky" Harris (fl. 1940s), crewman of patrol torpedo boat PT-109, commanded by then LTJG John F. Kennedy

== Politics ==
- Charles Harris (mayor) (1772–1827), American mayor of Savannah, Georgia
- Charles M. Harris (1821–1896), U.S. representative from Illinois
- Charles Coffin Harris (1822–1881), lawyer who became a politician and judge in the Kingdom of Hawaii
- Sir Charles Alexander Harris (1855–1947), governor of Newfoundland
- Charles Oscar Harris (1852–1913), American public official and state legislator in Alabama
- Charles Edward Harris, 1892 U.S. representative from Massachusetts

== Science ==
- Charles B. Harris (1940–2020), American physical chemist
- Charles Boarman Harris (1857–1942), American physician and surgeon
- Charles Felix Harris (1900–1974), medical doctor and Vice Chancellor of London University

== Sports ==
- Charlie Harris (third baseman) (1877–1963), American baseball third baseman
- Charles Harris (cricketer) (1907–1954), English cricketer
- Charles Harris (tennis) (1914–1993), American tennis player of the 1930s
- Charlie Harris (second baseman) (fl. 1943–1944), Negro league baseball player
- Charles Harris (water polo) (born 1963), American water polo player
- Charles Harris (canoeist) (fl. 1980s), American slalom canoeist
- Charles Harris (American football) (born 1995), American football player
- Charles S. Harris (1951–2022), American athletic and academic administrator
- Chuck Harris (American football) (born 1961), American football player
- Chuck Harris (basketball) (born 2001), American basketball player
- Chris Colt (Charles Fay Harris, 1946–1995), American professional wrestler

== Others ==
- Charles Harris (pirate) (1698–1723), English pirate
- Charles Wilson Harris (1771–1804), presiding professor of the University of North Carolina during 1796
- Charles Harris (bishop) (1813–1874), bishop of Gibraltar in the Church of England
- Charles Hope Harris (1846–1915), surveyor in South Australia
- Charles F. Harris (1934–2015), African-American founder of Amistad Press
- Charles Joseph Harris (1853–1944), American industrialist in North Carolina
- Charles Bryan Harris, one of the FBI's Ten Most Wanted Fugitives in 1965

== See also ==
- Sir Charles Stuart-Harris (1909–1996), English virologist
- List of people with surname Harris
