= Shailene (given name) =

Shailene is a feminine given name. Notable people with the given name include:

- Shailene Woodley (born 1991), American actress
- Shailene Garnett, Canadian actress

== See also ==
- Sharleen
- Charlene (given name), including a list of people and fictional characters named Charlene, Charleen or Charlyne
- Charline (name), another given name
- Charlyne
