= Charny =

Charny may refer to:

== People ==
- Geoffroi de Charny (c. 1306–1356), French knight
- Israel Charny (1931–2024), Israeli psychologist

== Places ==
- Charny, Côte-d'Or, a commune of the Côte-d'Or département, in France;
- Charny, Seine-et-Marne, a commune of the Seine-et-Marne département, in France;
- Charny, Yonne, a commune of the Yonne département, in France;
- Charny, Quebec, a former municipality now amalgamated in the city of Lévis in Quebec, Canada
- Charny-le-Bachot, a commune of the Aube département, in France
- Charny-Orée-de-Puisaye, a commune of the Yonne département, in France
- Charny-sur-Meuse, a commune of the Meuse département, in France
- Charnwood, Australian Capital Territory, nicknamed ‘Charny’

== See also ==
- Charly (name)
- Thorey-sous-Charny, a commune of the Côte-d'Or département
