= Charles Collins =

Charles Collins may refer to:

- Charles E. Collins (politician) (1929–2012), independent candidate for the president of the United States in 1996 and 2000
- Charles Collins (Rhode Island politician) (1773–1845), lieutenant governor of Rhode Island 1824–1833, ally of the slave-trading DeWolf family
- Charles E. Collins (American football), American football coach
- Charles Collins (actor) (1904–1999), American actor
- Charles Collins (painter) (c. 1680–1744), Irish painter
- Charles Collins (songwriter) (1874–1923), English music hall songwriter
- Charles Allston Collins (1828–1873), British Pre-Raphaelite painter
- Chuck Collins (born 1959), American author on inequality
- Chuck Collins (American football) (1903–1977), head coach of the North Carolina football team
- Charles James Collins (1820–1864), English journalist and novelist
- Charles Collins (ice hockey) (1882–1920), Canadian ice hockey player
- Charles Collins (New South Wales politician) (1850–1898), member of the New South Wales Legislative Assembly
- Charles Collins (Queensland politician) (1867–1936), miner, trade union organiser, and member of the Queensland Legislative Assembly
- Charles Collins (British Army officer)
- Charles Henry Collins (1887–1983), British colonial civil servant

== See also ==
- Charlie Collins (disambiguation)
