= Charyl =

Charyl is a given name that is an alternate spelling of Carol, variation of Charlie, and contraction of Charlene and Charlotte. Charyl is also used as a variation of Cheryl.

- Charyl Chappuis (born 1992), Thai footballer
- Charyl Chacón (born 1985), Peru-born, Venezuela-raised beauty queen

== See also ==
- Charl (name)
- Charly (name)
- Cheryl (disambiguation)
