= Charles Ferguson =

Charles Ferguson may refer to:

== Sports ==
- Charlie Ferguson (1880s pitcher) (1863–1888), American baseball player
- Charlie Ferguson (1900s pitcher) (1875–1931), American baseball pitcher
- Charlie Ferguson (footballer, born 1910) (1910–1995), Scottish football player and manager
- Charlie Ferguson (footballer, born 1930), (1930–2017), Scottish football player
- Charley Ferguson (1939–2023), American football player

== Other people ==
- Charles Frederick Ferguson (c. 1833–1909), Canadian member of parliament
- Charles John Ferguson (1840–1904), English architect
- Charles Ferguson (died 1946), African American man killed by white police officer
- Charles A. Ferguson (1921–1998), Stanford University linguist
- Charles Ferguson (filmmaker) (born 1955), co-founder of Vermeer Technologies Inc. and film director

== See also ==
- Charlie Ferguson (disambiguation)
- Charles Fergusson (disambiguation)
- Charles Ferguson Hoey (1914–1944), Canadian recipient of the VC
- Charles Ferguson Smith (1807–1862), U.S. army officer
