= Charbin =

Charbin may refer to:

- Charbin, Iran
- Charbin, Poland
- Harbin, Manchuria, China

== See also ==
- Charlin (name)
