= Charli =

Charli may refer to:

- Charli, Iran, village in Hamadan Province, Iran
- Charli, Rajasthan, village in India
- Charli (album), the third studio album by Charli XCX
- Charli (name)

== See also ==
- Carli (given name)
- Charla (name)
- Charly (name)
