= Chares =

Chares (Greek: Χάρης) is the name of three prominent ancient Greeks:

- Chares of Athens - a 4th-century BC general;
- Chares of Mytilene - a historian who lived at the court of Alexander the Great;
- Chares of Lindos - a sculptor who created the Colossus of Rhodes

A chare may also be:

- Chare - a dialect term in north-east England for an alleyway

== See also ==
- Charls
