= Charles Forbes =

Charles Forbes may refer to:

== People ==
- Sir Charles Forbes, 1st Baronet (1774–1849), Scottish politician
- Charles Forbes (Royal Navy officer) (1880–1960), British admiral
- Charlie Forbes (1865–1922), Australian rules footballer
- Charles E. Forbes (1795–1881), justice of the Massachusetts Supreme Judicial Court
- Charles Fergusson Forbes (1779–1852), English army surgeon
- Charles John Forbes (1786–1862), British army officer and political figure in Canada East
- Charles Noyes Forbes (1883–1920), American botanist
- Charles R. Forbes (1878–1952), Scottish-American soldier, politician, and civil servant

== Other uses ==
- Sir Charles Forbes (1824 ship), chartered by the New Zealand Company in 1842

== See also ==
- Charles Forbes-Leith (1859–1930), British army officer and politician
- Charles Forbes René de Montalembert (1810–1870), French publicist and historian
- B. C. Forbes (Bertie Charles Forbes, 1880–1954), Scottish-American financial writer and founder of the magazine Forbes
