= Charles Fergusson (disambiguation) =

Sir Charles Fergusson, 7th Baronet (1865–1951) was a British Army officer and Governor-General of New Zealand.

Charles Fergusson may also refer to:

- Sir Charles Dalrymple Fergusson, 5th Baronet (1800–1849), Scottish lawyer
- Charles Bruce Fergusson (1911–1978), Canadian historian
- Sir Charles Fergusson, 9th Baronet, of the Fergusson baronets

== See also ==
- Charles Ferguson (disambiguation)
- Charles Fergusson Forbes (1779–1852), English army surgeon
