= Charli (name) =

Charli is a Spanish masculine given name and nickname that is a diminutive form of Carlos as well as an English unisex given name and nickname that is a feminine form of Charlie and a diminutive form of Charles and Charline. It may also derive from Charlotte. Notable people referred to by this name include the following:

== Given name ==
- Charli Collier (born 1999), American basketball player
- Charli D'Amelio (born 2004), American social media influencer and dancer
- Charli Evans (born 1997), Australian professional wrestler
- Charli Grant (born 2001), Australian soccer player
- Charli Jacoby (born 1989), American rugby union player
- Charli Petrov (born 2007), Australian diver
- Charli Knott (born 2002), Australian cricketer
- Charli Turner Thorne (born 1966), American basketball coach

== Nickname or stagename ==
- Charli Baltimore, stage name of Tiffany Lane Jarmon (born 1974), American female rapper and songwriter
- Charli Howard, nickname of Charlotte Howard (born 1991), English female model, author, and body activist
- Charli Persip, professional name of Charles Lawrence Persip who was formerly known as Charlie Persip (1929–2020), American male jazz drummer
- Charli Robinson, professional name of Sharlene Marie Zeta Robinson (born 1980), Australian female television and radio presenter as well as an original member of Hi-5
- Charli Taft, stage name of Charlotte Taft, British female singer and songwriter
- Charli XCX, stage name of Charlotte Emma Aitchison (born 1992), English female singer and songwriter

== See also ==
- Charli (disambiguation)
- Charl (name)
- Charlin (name)
- Charls
