= Charlyn =

Charlyn is a given name. Notable people with this name include the following:

- Charlyn Corral (born 1991), Mexican footballer
- Charlyn Marie Marshall, known by her stage name Cat Power, (born 1972), American singer-songwriter

== See also ==
- Charlin (name)
- Charly (name)
- Charlyne
