= Sharlene =

Sharlene is an English feminine given name that is a diminutive of Charles. Notable people with the name include:

- Sharlene Cartwright-Robinson (born 1971), Turks and Caicos Islands politician
- Sharlene Chiu, Canadian television reporter, host, and producer
- Sharlene Flores, Trinidad and Tobago singer
- Sharlene Heywood (born 1963), Australian cricket player
- Sharlene Rädlein (born 1990), Jamaican model and beauty pageant titleholder
- Sharlene Royer, Canadian actress and stunt performer
- Sharlene San Pedro (born 1999), Filipino actress, singer, vlogger, VJ, and TV Host
- Sharlene Taulé, better known as Sharlene, (born 1989), Dominican actress and singer and songwriter
- Sharlene Wells Hawkes (born 1964), Paraguayan beauty queen, author and sports reporter
- Sharlene Whyte (born 1976), English actress

== See also ==
- Sharleen
- Charlene (given name)
- Charline (name)
- Charlyne
