= List of killings by law enforcement officers in the United States in the 1940s =

This is a list of people reported killed by non-military law enforcement officers in the United States in the 1940s, whether in the line of duty or not, and regardless of reason or method. The listing documents the occurrence of a death, making no implications regarding wrongdoing or justification on the part of the person killed or officer involved. Killings are arranged by date of the incident that caused death. Different death dates, if known, are noted in the description. This page lists 267 people.

== 1940s ==
The table below lists 267 people.

| Date | Name (age) of deceased | State (city) | Description |
|---|---|---|---|
| 1949-12-08 | Paul Johnson (24) | Florida (Key West) | Johnson, a Black man serving a four-year sentence at a state prison camp, was shot by prison guard Owen H. Sherrouse during a prison riot. |
| 1949-12-03 | Willie Hawthorne (26) | Florida (Miami) | Hawthorne, a Black Navy veteran, was killed by off-duty police officer Andres Almoina, who claimed it was an accident. |
| 1949-11-24 | Stephen Brown (52) | Alabama (Montgomery) | Brown, a Black laborer, was killed by two police officers who claimed they say a gun in his belt. |
| 1949-11-19 | Eugene Martin (22) | Alabama (Tuscaloosa) | Martin, a Black man, was killed by police officer George Snyder. Snyder claimed he was trying to arrest Martin when he allegedly pulled a pistol. |
| 1949-11-11 | John Edwards (21) | Alabama (Brighton) | |
| 1949-11-05 | Eugene Jones | Louisiana (Gretna) | |
| 1949-10-29 | Richard Nelson | Georgia (Alma) | |
| 1949-10-18 | Willie Shuford (40) | North Carolina (Rolesville) | |
| 1949-10-15 | Charlie Lewis (40) | Alabama (Birmingham) | |
| 1949-08-06 | L. C. Culver | Georgia (Sparta) | |
| 1949-08-04 | John Glasper (25) | Georgia (Buford) | |
| 1949-07-29 | Henry Gordon (20) | Alabama (Springville) | |
| 1949-07-28 | Walter Dandridge (32) | Alabama (Birmingham) | |
| 1949-07-28 | Susie Dandridge (60) | Alabama (Birmingham) | |
| 1949-07-26 | Ernest Thomas | Florida (Madison) | |
| 1949-07-23 | Lonnie Cobb (22) | Alabama (Tarrant) | |
| 1949-07-08 | Edgar Brown | Mississippi (Cleveland) | |
| 1949-07-04 | Wilbert Robinson, (24) | Louisiana (East Feliciana Parish) | |
| 1949-07-04 | Chrispon Charles | Louisiana (New Orleans) | |
| 1949-07-02 | John Wilson | Alabama (Anniston) | |
| 1949-07-01 | James Green | Florida (Center Hill) | |
| 1949-06-27 | Willie Sterling (42) | Alabama (Toulminville) | |
| 1949-06-25 | Samson Ingram (25) | Florida (Tampa) | |
| 1949-05-31 | Daniel Hunter | Alabama (Birmingham) | |
| 1949-05-30 | Caleb Hill (28) | Georgia (Irwinton) | |
| 1949-05-23 | Frank Cooks | Mississippi (Cleveland) | |
| 1949-05-18 | Jim Bradley (21) | North Carolina (Taylorsville) | |
| 1949-05-17 | John Thomas (22) | Texas (Carthage) | |
| 1949-05-08 | Henry Lee | Alabama (Montgomery) | |
| 1949-05-03 | William Johnson (55) | Georgia (Brunswick) | |
| 1949-04-23 | James Thomas (31) | Alabama (Birmingham) | |
| 1949-04-22 | William Jones (24) | Florida (West Palm Beach) | |
| 1949-04-17 | George McIntyre (25) | Washington (Pullman) | McIntyre was wanted for questioning by Pullman police concerning an assault. He shot and killed officer Ross Klaar when Klaar attempted to arrest him. McIntyre ran away from the scene but was later found by other officers. A gun battle ensued, during which three law enforcement officers and McIntyre died. |
| 1949-04-13 | Sylvester Burrell | New York (Manhattan) | |
| 1949-04-07 | James Jones (26) | Florida (Broward County) | |
| 1949-04-04 | Hayes Kinney (43) | Alabama (Bessemer) | |
| 1949-04-03 | Johnnie Young (40) | Alabama (Birmingham) | |
| 1949-04-01 | Ed Craig (71) | Alabama (Bessemer) | |
| 1949-03-26 | Ocie Knox (33) | Alabama (Troy) | |
| 1949-03-05 | Robert Bradby | Virginia (Roxbury) | |
| 1949-02-26 | Sam Terry (37) | Georgia (Manchester) | |
| 1949-02-26 | Frank Burris | North Carolina (Kings Mountain) | |
| 1949-02-24 | Ulmer Williams (22) | Mississippi (Forest) | |
| 1948-12-31 | William Hudgins (16) | Alabama (Birmingham) | |
| 1948-12-29 | Robert James (20) | Alabama (Birmingham) | |
| 1948-12-10 | Theris Wood (19) | Alabama (Birmingham) | Wood, a Black 19-year-old man, was shot to death by three police officers who claimed he was trying to enter an East Lake home through a window. |
| 1948-12-03 | Johnson, Simon | Florida (Greenville) | |
| 1948-11-13 | Smith, Miles | Florida (Greenville) | |
| 1948-10-10 | Bryant, Danny | Louisiana (Covington) | |
| 1948-09-27 | Charles Menaker (21) | New York (Bronx) | |
| 1948-09-05 | Wright, Charlie (35) | Alabama (Birmingham) | |
| 1948-08-29 | Miller, George | Arkansas (Lake Village) | |
| 1948-08-11 | Perkins, Joe Webster (33) | Alabama (Birmingham) | |
| 1948-08-09 | Ford, Vinson (15) | Louisiana (Weyanoke) | |
| 1948-07-10 | Burts, James (23) | South Carolina (Greenville) | |
| 1948-07-04 | Gladney, Joe Lee | Mississippi (Louisville) | |
| 1948-06-27 | Richardson, C. D. | Louisiana (Baton Rouge) | |
| 1948-06-05 | Banks, Solomon | Virginia (Emporia) | |
| 1948-06-05 | Butler, Leonard (53) | Alabama (Edgewater) | |
| 1948-05-29 | Walker, James | Alabama (Montgomery) | |
| 1948-05-29 | Weston, Walter (36) | Alabama (Birmingham) | |
| 1948-05-18 | Unnamed man | New York (Brooklyn) | |
| 1948-05-08 | Wilson, Dave (48) | Alabama (Flat Creek) | |
| 1948-05-02 | Carter, Hosea (32) | Mississippi (Sandy Hook) | |
| 1948-04-30 | Ward, Eugene | Alabama (Bessemer) | |
| 1948-04-27 | Noble, Marion (19) | Alabama (Birmingham) | |
| 1948-04-17 | Shaw, Atmos (42) | Alabama (Birmingham) | |
| 1948-04-14 | Vergess, Lott | Alabama (Morris) | |
| 1948-04-10 | Curry, Theodore Roosevelt (26) | Arkansas (North Little Rock) | |
| 1948-04-08 | Fleming, Fred | North Carolina (Fayetteville) | |
| 1948-03-29 | Johnson, John | Alabama (Birmingham) | |
| 1948-03-28 | Smith, Roosevelt | Florida (Tallahassee) | |
| 1948-03-27 | Madden, Ike | Alabama (Birmingham) | |
| 1948-03-24 | Williams, Ernest (22) | Texas (Sugar Land) | |
| 1948-03-13 | Hutson, Ellis | Texas (Nacogdoches) | |
| 1948-03-15 | Bacon, Samuel (51) | Mississippi (Fayette) | |
| 1948-02-27 | Brooks, Roy | Louisiana (Gretna) | |
| 1948-02-12 | Bell, Jack | Georgia (Atlanta) | |
| 1948-02-08 | Hughes, Wade | Mississippi (Kosciusko) | |
| 1948-02-06 | Tolliver, James | Arkansas (Little Rock) | |
| 1948-02-02 | Thomas, Georgia | Mississippi (Kosciusko) | |
| 1948-03-20 | Ray, Edward | North Carolina (Carthage) | |
| 1947-12-17 | Curry, Charley | Texas (Dallas) | |
| 1947-11-22 | Cowart, Bill | Mississippi (Tylertown) | |
| 1947-11-15 | Palmer, Walter | Mississippi (Edwards) | |
| 1947-11-04 | McCowin, Leonard | Texas (Center) | |
| 1947-10-25 | Starr, Amos (38) | Alabama (Tallassee) | Starr, a Black brick mason, was killed by police officer Cecil Thrash. Starr had testified against Thrash in a federal prosecution for bootlegging. Thrash arrested Starr and killed him. |
| 1947-10-17 | Robertson, Noverta (26) | Mississippi (Walnut) | Robertson, a Black section hand, was beaten unconscious by the town marshal. Witnesses said Robertson didn't resist and did nothing to provoke the assault. He died shortly after of brain injury. |
| 1947-09-07 | Baity, Lieutenant | Florida (South Miami) | Baity, a Black laborer, was shot and killed by patrolman William Bailey. Bailey claimed that Baity had been drunk driving and had a knife. |
| 1947-09-07 | A. C. Hopkins (40) | Florida (Miami-Dade County) | A. C. Hopkins, a Black WWII veteran, was killed by police officer Richard O. Wiegand after the officer went into a Black neighborhood and claimed Hopkins was causing a disturbance. Hopkins allegedly struck the officer with his fist and the officer fatally shot him. Wiegand was charged with second degree murder but acquitted. |
| 1947-09-06 | Thomas, Randolph (25) | Louisiana (Ponchatoula) | |
| 1947-08-17 | Vines, Meb | North Carolina (Farmville) | |
| 1947-08-17 | Robinson, Detroit | Florida (Miami) | |
| 1947-08-07 | Phelts, Eva Mae | Florida (Raiford) | |
| 1947-08-01 | Johnson, Versie (30) | Mississippi (Prentiss) | |
| 1947-07-16 | Brown, William | Louisiana (Torras) | |
| 1947-07-13 | Tucker, Morris | Florida (Palatka) | |
| 1947-07-12 | Smith, Ball | Georgia (Georgetown) | |
| 1947-07-11 | Chambers, Willie | Georgia (Brunswick) | |
| 1947-07-11 | Mason, Henry | Georgia (Brunswick) | |
| 1947-07-11 | Neal, Edward | Georgia (Brunswick) | |
| 1947-07-11 | Patterson, George | Georgia (Brunswick) | |
| 1947-07-11 | Smith, Jonah | Georgia (Brunswick) | |
| 1947-07-11 | Smith, James | Georgia (Brunswick) | |
| 1947-07-11 | Stephens, Dan | Georgia (Brunswick) | |
| 1947-07-11 | Willie Wright | Georgia (Brunswick) | |
| 1947-06-29 | Jimmie Wade | Tennessee (Covington) | |
| 1947-06-07 | Henry Andrews | North Carolina (Warrenton) | |
| 1947-05-29 | Joe Roberts (23) | Georgia (Sardis) | |
| 1947-05-22 | Henry Gilbert (42) | Georgia (LaGrange) | |
| 1947-05-22 | Gus Davidson | Georgia (LaGrange) | |
| 1947-04-21 | Willie Crook | Tennessee (Ripley) | |
| 1947-04-20 | Benjamin Franklin Seldon (35) | Tennessee (Memphis) | |
| 1947-04-05 | Charles Joseph | Louisiana (Hammond) | |
| 1947-02-19 | Elmer Henry Pierce (37) | Illinois (Chicago) | Nine Chicago policemen ambushed Pierce, whom they described as "a dangerous maniac". According to detective Joseph McCabe, Pierce ignored an order to surrender and reached for a gun, at which point McCabe killed him with ten shots from a machine gun. |
| 1947-01-18 | George Teague | Alabama (Birmingham) | |
| 1947-01-11 | Ike Williams | Alabama (Birmingham) | |
| 1947-01-05 | Matt McWilliams | Mississippi (Blackwater) | |
| 1947-01-01 | Alphonse Rocco | New York (Gilboa) | Rocco's ex-wife Olga was shot with a shotgun by a woman who had been duped into thinking that she was merely taking a photograph. Rocco was wanted by the NYPD for questioning in connection with the shooting. Detectives tracked him to Gilboa, where he was shot nine times. |
| 1946-12-16 | Allen Milton (38) | Alabama (Eufaula) | |
| 1946-11-24 | George Perkins (25) | Tennessee (Winchester) | |
| 1946-11-09 | Casey Pointer (35) | Mississippi (Cleveland) | |
| 1946-11-01 | Jose Adrian Trujillo Seijas (20) | Florida (Bunnell) | Police shot Seijas after he and a friend were refused cafe service because of the color of their skin under Jim Crow laws. Seijas was the nephew of then-president of the Dominican Republic, Rafael Trujillo. |
| 1946-10-29 | Samuel Watson (41) | Alabama (Selma) | |
| 1946-10-08 | Stephen Johnson | Louisiana (Crown Point) | Johnson was likely shot in the woods by four men including game warden Joseph Builliot. His body was later found floating in the bayou. |
| 1946-09-22 | Walter Willis (20) | Virginia (Richmond) | A police officer arrested Willis on a misdemeanor charge and fatally shot Willis when he allegedly tried to flee. |
| 1946-09-15 | Clifton Dockins (63) | Louisiana (Bunkie) | |
| 1946-08-26 | William Clark | Arkansas (Jennie) | |
| 1946-08-05 | Harrison Lee (40) | Alabama (Birmingham) | |
| 1946-08-05 | JD Edwards (26) | Mississippi (Gatesville) | |
| 1946-08-03 | JC Farmer (20) | North Carolina (Sims) | |
| 1946-07-31 | Willie Henry (39) | Arkansas (Helena) | |
| 1946-07-27 | Edgar Wolf (38) | Mississippi (Collins) | |
| 1946-07-13 | Bedford Smith | Tennessee (Bell Buckle) | Police officers attempted to search Smith's wife's luggage. Smith objected to the search and was fatally shot by police. |
| 1946-06-23 | John P. Williams (33) | Florida (Panama City) | |
| 1946-06-21 | Willie Malachi Williams (45) | Alabama (Coalburg) | |
| 1946-05-31 | Billy Singleton (33) | Texas (Beaumont) | |
| 1946-05-09 | Elliott Brooks (34) | Louisiana (Gretna) | Police Chief Beauregard Miller arrested Brooks for "prowling" and then fatally shot him. According to the NAACP, Brooks might have had information about Miller's role in the disappearance of a prisoner. |
| 1946-05-02 | William Pim Lockwood (59) | Alabama (Tuskegee) | |
| 1946-04-27 | Arthur Keels (24) | Louisiana (Winnfield) | |
| 1946-02-28 | James Johnson | Tennessee (Columbia) | |
| 1946-02-28 | William Gordon | Tennessee (Columbia) | |
| 1946-02-25 | Kenney R. Long | Texas (El Campo) | |
| 1946-02-19 | Willie J. Little (23) | Alabama (Birmingham) | |
| 1946-02-09 | Frank Baker Allen (26) | Tennessee (Memphis) | |
| 1946-02-08 | Timothy Hood (23) | Alabama (Bessemer) | |
| 1946-02-05 | Charles Ferguson | New York (Freeport) | On February 5, 1946, Charles and Alphonso Ferguson, two African-American men in their 20s, were killed by Joseph Romeika, a 26-year-old white police officer. |
| 1946-02-05 | Alphonso Ferguson | New York (Freeport) | On February 5, 1946, Charles and Alphonso Ferguson, two African-American men in their 20s, were killed by Joseph Romeika, a 26-year-old white police officer. |
| 1946-02-02 | James Fuller | Florida (Pierson) | Three deputy sheriffs raiding a jukejoint shot Fuller, claiming he was attempting to flee and that he had a gun, which eyewitnesses disputed. |
| 1946-01-07 | Leroy Bradwell (26) | Florida (Midway) | |
| 1946-01-05 | Booker Spearman | Georgia (Hawkinsville) | |
| 1945-12-15 | Henry Bailey | Arkansas (Arkadelphia) | |
| 1945-12-15 | Herman Wilson | Arkansas (Arkadelphia) | |
| 1945-12-01 | Jessie Hightower (38) | Alabama (Union Springs) | |
| 1945-11-10 | St. Clair Pressley | South Carolina (Johnsonville) | |
| 1945-10-20 | George Floyd | Florida (Saint Augustine) | |
| 1945-10-13 | Edgar Thomas (63) | Alabama (Union Springs) | |
| 1945-09-21 | Sam McFadden (40) | Florida (Suwannee County) | |
| 1945-09-08 | Moses Greene | South Carolina (Ellenton) | |
| 1945-09-08 | Tom Jones | Mississippi (Woodville) | |
| 1945-07-07 | Prinest McCann | Alabama (Mobile) | |
| 1945-06-26 | Charlie Smith (50) | Georgia (Folkston) | |
| 1945-06-23 | Margaret Doherty (32) | New Jersey (Jersey City) | Doherty was shot and killed by her partner, 42-year-old Port Authority of New York and New Jersey officer Paul Rickli, in a murder-suicide. |
| 1945-06-19 | David A. Rigsby (26) | Missouri (St. Louis County) | During a traffic stop two miles west of Kirkwood, Rigsby allegedly attacked an officer with his fists, prompting the officer to shoot Rigsby once and kill him. |
| 1945-06-16 | Marvin Edmundson | North Carolina (Fremont) | |
| 1945-06-11 | Charlie Price (20) | Georgia (Cooktown) | |
| 1945-06-10 | Niece Brown | Alabama (Summerfield) | |
| 1945-06-02 | Walter Toliver | Texas (Houston) | |
| 1945-05-12 | William Griffin (65) | North Carolina (Elizabeth City) | Griffin fired shots at passing cars along a highway and then reportedly shot at responding police, wounding an officer. He was shot and killed by the officers as he apparently aimed the rifle at a bus. |
| 1945-05-12 | Robert Kinnebrew | Texas (Jasper County) | |
| 1945-05-11 | Denice Harris (22) | Georgia (College Park) | |
| 1945-04-27 | George Johnson (22) | Georgia (Atlanta) | |
| 1945-04-23 | Adam Green (33) | Arkansas (Dumas) | |
| 1945-04-02 | Clark Hickman (17) | Ohio (Cleveland) | Hickman, a burglary suspect, was shot and killed by a temporary policeman after he allegedly disobeyed the officer's commands to halt. |
| 1945-03-23 | Hattie Debardelaben (46) | Alabama (Mulberry) | |
| 1945-03-18 | Harold Hansen (40) | Tennessee (Memphis) | Patrolman Onnie Seago shot and killed Hansen in a hotel room as Hansen had a liaison with Seago's wife. |
| 1945-03-16 | James Oliver | Georgia (Savannah) | |
| 1945-01-15 | John Leslie | Texas (Beeville) | |
| 1945-01-13 | Thomas Reed (25) | Virginia (Petersburg) | Reed, a soldier stationed at Camp Lee, was shot and killed by a Petersburg civilian officer after he allegedly attacked two military policemen with a knife. |
| 1945-01-07 | Russell Williams (30) | Louisiana (New Orleans) | |
| 1944-11-02 | Curtis Hairston | Georgia (LaGrange) | |
| 1944-10-16 | Willie Osborn | Louisiana (Lake Providence) | |
| 1944-09-17 | Woodrow Wilson McClure | Mississippi (Canton) | |
| 1944-08-12 | Eddie Amos (37) | Florida (South Miami) | |
| 1944-08-01 | Joe Rainey | Florida (Conway) | |
| 1944-07-25 | Joshua Collins (32) | Mississippi (Jackson) | |
| 1944-07-04 | Mitchell Dunklin | Alabama (Pleasant Hill) | |
| 1944-05-17 | Joseph Hardy | Louisiana (New Iberia) | |
| 1944-05-01 | Anthony Goins (37) | Louisiana (New Orleans) | |
| 1944-04-16 | Aaron Dixon (17) | Georgia (Atlanta) | |
| 1944-04-15 | Theodore Samuels | Alabama (Mobile) | |
| 1944-04-09 | Matthew Milton | Georgia (Blackshear) | |
| 1944-03-22 | Henry Hauser | Louisiana (New Orleans) | |
| 1944-03-11 | Raymond McMurray (20) | Alabama (Pell City) | |
| 1944-02-21 | William Whitehorn | Tennessee (Whiteville) | |
| 1944-01-25 | George Franks | Georgia (Atlanta) | |
| 1943-12-28 | Knox Fail | Alabama (Birmingham) | |
| 1943-11-07 | Clarence Price (20) | Louisiana (Shreveport) | |
| 1943-11-02 | John McCormick (22) | North Carolina (Sanford) | |
| 1943-09-10 | Lester Hammer (28) | Alabama (Montgomery) | |
| 1943-08-28 | Alfonzo Merritt (39) | Alabama (Tuscumbia) | Merritt was visiting a friend's home when police searched the house for whiskey. Officer John Patrick fatally shot Merritt in the course of the search. |
| 1943-08-14 | William Davis (38) | Alabama (Marion Junction) | |
| 1943-08-09 | Willie Cooper | Alabama (Monroeville) | |
| 1943-07-28 | Ennis Bell | Alabama (Mobile) | |
| 1943-07-03 | Willie Davis | Georgia (Twin City) | |
| 1943-06-30 | Edward Simms | Mississippi (Columbus) | |
| 1943-06-27 | Woodrow Wilson | North Carolina (Greenville) | |
| 1943-06-19 | R.D. Howard (33) | Louisiana (West Carroll) | |
| 1943-06-17 | Felton Robinson (32) | Louisiana (New Orleans) | |
| 1943-05-30 | George Leatherman (20) | Tennessee (Rosser) | |
| 1943-05-30 | William Walker (29) | Mississippi (Centreville) | |
| 1943-05-02 | Lamar White | Florida (Chattahoochee) | |
| 1943-05-01 | Joseph Bolds | Georgia (Palmetto) | |
| 1943-03-20 | Jessie Lewis | Alabama (Conecuh County) | |
| 1943-02-04 | Crosier, Gladstone | Louisiana (New Orleans) | |
| 1943-01-23 | Robert "Bobbie" Hall | Georgia (Newton) | Robert Hall, a black man, was beaten to death by Baker County Sheriff M. Claude Screws, Policeman Jones, and Special Deputy Kelley (all white). The officers arrested Hall late at night at his home for the theft of a tire, handcuffed him, drove him to the courthouse, and beat him (still handcuffed) on the courthouse steps with their fists and an eight-inch solid-bar blackjack for between 15 and 30 minutes until he reached unconsciousness. They then dragged his body to the jail and called an ambulance. Hall was taken to a hospital where he died within the hour. The officers claimed Hall had reached for a gun and used insulting language when arriving at the courthouse. Screws was indicted on federal charges of violating Hall's civil rights, but Supreme Court case Screws v. United States was decided in Screws' favor. |
| 1942-11-04 | Larry Stroud | South Carolina (Columbia) | |
| 1942-11-01 | Raymond Carr | Louisiana (Alexandria) | |
| 1942-10-17 | Howard Wash (49) | Mississippi (Laurel) | |
| 1942-09-18 | Levi McDaniel (23) | Louisiana (New Orleans) | |
| 1942-08-31 | Calvin Fields | Florida (Jacksonville) | |
| 1942-08-11 | Jack Bloodworth | Alabama (Docena) | |
| 1942-07-24 | Herman Jones (26) | Virginia (Suffolk) | |
| 1942-06-27 | Walter Gunn (34) | Alabama (Tuskegee) | |
| 1942-06-27 | Charles Brown (43) | Alabama (Montgomery) | |
| 1942-04-08 | Henry Mathews (37) | Alabama (Birmingham) | |
| 1942-03-28 | James Martin | Virginia (Prince George County) | |
| 1942-03-22 | Thomas Foster | Arkansas (Little Rock) | |
| 1942-03-21 | Haif Williams | Arkansas (Hampton) | |
| 1942-02-21 | Howard Wilpitz (32) | Texas (Brookshire) | |
| 1942-02-08 | Grant Johnson | Florida (Perrine) | |
| 1942-01-24 | Willie Pless (21) | Georgia (Hawkinsville) | |
| 1941-10-16 | George Smith | Virginia (Virginia Beach) | |
| 1941-09-13 | Thomas Knighton (22) | Louisiana (Pineville) | Knighton, a Black school bus driver, was killed by a highway officer in a manner that involved "significant head injuries." |
| 1941-08-19 | Jessie Covington (42) | Mississippi (Clarksdale) | |
| 1941-08-17 | Clarence Thompson (36) | Louisiana (New Orleans) | |
| 1941-08-12 | Lewis Gordon (22) | Georgia (Trenton) | |
| 1941-08-10 | Chester Revis (21) | North Carolina (Eureka) | |
| 1941-08-01 | Jesse Cobb (24) | Alabama (Montgomery) | |
| 1941-07-29 | Flam Belle (22) | Georgia (Sparta) | Prison guards beat Belle to death with a pipe. |
| 1941-07-26 | Harrison Ware (49) | Missouri (Kansas City) | Two white police officers, Charles LaBaugh and Dewey Ellis, shot and killed Ware, a Black man, at a club, before taking money from his pockets. The officers were indicted for second-degree murder but were found not guilty in 1942. |
| 1941-07-13 | William Fowler | South Carolina (Startanburg) | |
| 1941-05-31 | Roosevelt Theodule (27) | Louisiana (Olivier) | |
| 1941-05-24 | Arthur Johnson (35) | Georgia (Cordele) | |
| 1941-05-23 | Eugene Whitfield (20) | Alabama (Birmingham) | |
| 1941-05-13 | Clifton McCrae | South Carolina (Clio) | |
| 1941-04-26 | John Jackson | Alabama (Fairfield) | |
| 1941-04-16 | Joseph Staver (23) | New Jersey (Elizabeth) | |
| 1941-03-24 | Albert King (22) | Georgia (Fort Benning) | |
| 1941-03-23 | Oscar Hambrick (42) | Georgia (Atlanta) | |
| 1941-03-14 | James Nobles (23) | Georgia (Rome) | |
| 1941-02-23 | Silas Welcher (35) | Georgia (Atlanta) | |
| 1941-01-27 | John Denham | Mississippi (Louisville) | |
| 1941-01-15 | Wilmer Smith (39) | Louisiana (Metairie) | |
| 1940-11-14 | Murray "Red Murray" Fershing (40) | New York (Manhattan) | |
| 1940-11-13 | Eddie Garrett (24) | Louisiana (Hammond) | |
| 1940-10-19 | Sylvester Lovejoy | Alabama (Andalusia) | |
| 1940-09-21 | E.J. Adams | Mississippi (Rankin County) | |
| 1940-08-26 | Willie B. Ricks (19) | Mississippi (Washington County) | |
| 1940-07-25 | Doyle Lee (28) | Georgia (DeKalb County) | Doyle Lee, a Black laborer in prison for a misdemeanor charge, died in a prison work camp. While the death certificate lists the cause of death as sunstroke, witnesses said that Lee had been beaten by prison guards and run over by a truck to make it look like an accidental death. |
| 1940-06-21 | Jesse Thornton (26) | Alabama (Luverne) | |
| 1940-05-24 | Boisey Botts (45) | Florida (Tallahassee) | |
| 1940-05-08 | O.D. Henderson (25) | Alabama (Fairfield) | |
| 1940-04-16 | Nep Roland (21) | Alabama (Montgomery) | |
| 1940-03-31 | Eddie Gildersleeve | Alabama (Pine Hill) | |
| 1940-03-24 | Frank Manning (30) | North Carolina (Chadbourn) | |
| 1940-02-19 | Joseph "Pat" Ryan | New York (Manhattan) | |
