= Charles Blair =

Charles Blair may refer to:

- Charles Stanley Blair (1927–1980), United States federal judge
- Charles F. Blair Jr. (1909–1978), United States Air Force general
- Chandos Blair (1919–2011), general and former Defence Services Secretary
- Chuck Blair (1928–2006), Canadian ice hockey player
- Charles W. Blair (1829–1899), Union Army general
- Charles A. Blair (1854–1912), member of the Michigan Supreme Court, 1905–1912
- Charlie Walker-Blair (born 1992), English rugby union footballer
