= Charlee (name) =

Charlee is an English unisex given name and nickname that is a feminine form of Charlie and a diminutive form of Charles. Notable people referred to by this name include the following:

== Given name ==
- Charlee Adams (born 1995), English male footballer
- Charlee Brooks (born 1988), American female vocalist, composer, and audio engineer
- Charlee Fraser (born 1995), Australian female fashion model
- Charlee Johnson, American male musician
- Charlee Minkin (born 1981), American female judoka
- Charlee Soto (born 2005), American baseball player

== Nickname/Stagename ==
- Charlee, stage name of Vera Luttenberger (born 1993), Austrian singer
- Charlee Jacob, pen name of Nell Anne Jacob (1952–2019), American female author

== See also ==
- Sharlee D'Angelo
- Charle (name)
