= Sharleen =

Sharleen is an English feminine given name that is a diminutive of Charles. Notable people with the name include:

== Given name ==
- Sharleen Makusha (born 1997), Zimbabwean netball player
- Sharleen Spiteri (born 1967), Scottish singer and songwriter
- Sharleen Spiteri (sex worker) (1967–2005), Australian sex worker
- Sharleen Stratton (born 1987), Australian diver

== See also ==
- Charlene - a similar name
- Sharlee D'Angelo
- Sharlene (an alternative spelling)
