= Charls =

Charls is a given name and a surname. Notable people known by this name include the following:

== Given name ==
- Charls Walker (1923 – 2015), American political official

== Surname ==
- Jinson Charls, Australian politician
- Rick Charls, American high diver

== See also ==
- Charas (disambiguation)
- Chares (disambiguation)
- Charis (name)
- Charl (name)
- Charla (name)
- Charle (name)
- Charles
- Charli (name)
- Charlo (name)
- Charlos (disambiguation)
- Charly (name)
- LeCharls McDaniel
