= Chaly (surname) =

Chaly, Chalyy, Chalii or Chalyi (Russian: Чалый, Ukrainian: Чалий) (masculine), Chalaya (feminine) may be an East Slavic surname. It is derived from the nickname which literally means "Roan" (a horse coat color pattern). The surname may also have other origins. Notable people with the surname include:

== Slavic ==
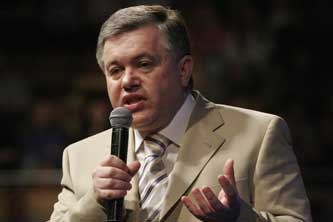
Oleksandr Chalyi, Ukraine's former First Deputy Minister for Foreign Affairs

- Aleksei Chaly (born 1961), Russian businessman and administrator
- Nikita Chaly (born 1996), Russian football forward
- Siarhey Chaly (born 1970), Belarusian economist and commenter
- Timofey Chalyy (born 1994), Russian hurdler
- Valeriy Chaly (diplomat) (born 1970), Ukrainian diplomat
- Valeriy Chaly (footballer) (born 1958), Ukrainian-Russian football coach and former player

== Other ==
- Shaji Paul Chaly (1961), Indian judge

== See also ==
- Chal (name)
- Charly (name)
