= Charlie Ferguson =

Charlie Ferguson may refer to:

- Charlie Ferguson (1880s pitcher) (1863–1888), American baseball player
- Charlie Ferguson (1900s pitcher) (1875–1931), American baseball pitcher
- Charlie Ferguson (footballer, born 1910) (1910–1995), Scottish football player and manager
- Charlie Ferguson (footballer, born 1930), (1930–2017), Scottish football player

== See also ==
- Charley Ferguson (1939–2023), American football player
- Charles Ferguson (disambiguation)
