= Cheryl (disambiguation) =

Cheryl is a female given name.

Cheryl may also refer to:

- Cheryl (singer), English singer formerly known as Cheryl Cole
- Cheryl (artist collective), a group of artists in New York
- "Cheryl" (composition), a 1947 jazz standard by Charlie Parker

== See also ==
- Charyl
- Sheryl
