= Chalin =

Chalin may refer to the following places in Poland:

- Chalin, Kuyavian-Pomeranian Voivodeship (north-central Poland)
- Chalin, Greater Poland Voivodeship (west-central Poland)

== See also ==
- Charlin (name)
