= Thorey-sous-Charny =

- Commune
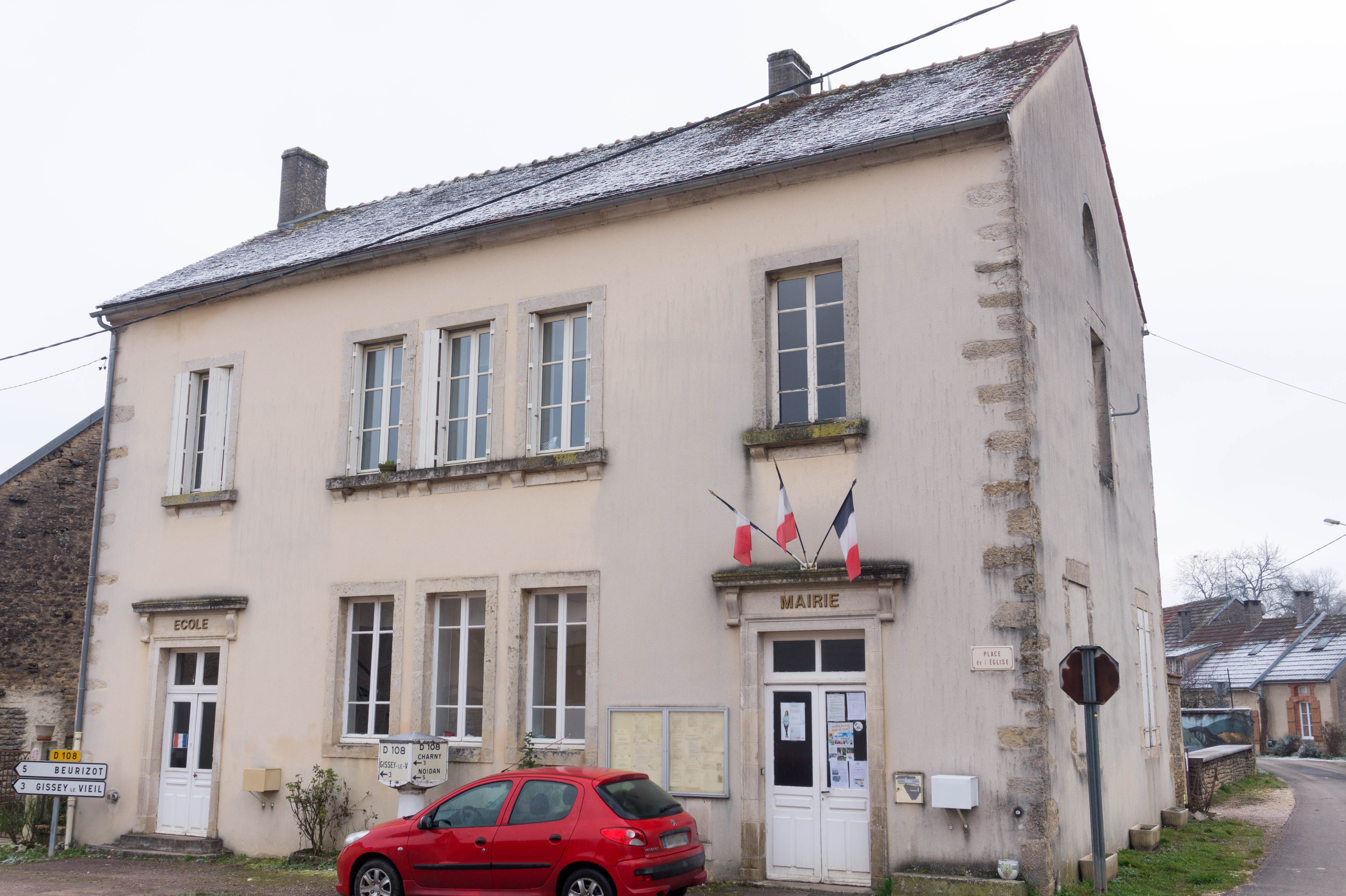
- The town hall in Thorey-sous-Charny
- Location of Thorey-sous-Charny
- Location within France Location within Bourgogne-Franche-Comté
- Coordinates: 47°19′29″N 4°26′50″E
- Country: France
- Region: Bourgogne-Franche-Comté
- Department: Côte-d'Or
- Arrondissement: Montbard
- Canton: Semur-en-Auxois

Government
  - Mayor (2020–2026): Amélie Real
- Area^{1}: 11.54 km^{2} (4.46 sq mi)
- Elevation: 330 m (1,080 ft)
- Highest elevation: 561 m (1,841 ft)
- Lowest elevation: 331 m (1,086 ft)
- Population (2023): 196
  - Density: 17.0/km^{2} (44.0/sq mi)
- Time zone: UTC+01:00 (CET)
  - Summer (DST): UTC+02:00 (CEST)
- INSEE/Postal code: 21633 /21350
- ^{1} French Land Register data, which excludes lakes, ponds, glaciers > 1 km^{2} (0.386 sq mi or 247 acres) and river estuaries.

Thorey-sous-Charny (French pronunciation: [tɔʁɛ su ʃaʁni], literally Thorey under Charny) is a commune in the Côte-d'Or department in eastern France.

== Population ==
Historical population
Year	Pop.	±% p.a.
1968	211	—
1975	199	−0.83%
1982	187	−0.88%
1990	191	+0.26%
1999	153	−2.43%
2007	184	+2.33%
2012	175	−1.00%
2017	179	+0.45%
2023	196	+1.52%
Source: INSEE

== See also ==
- Communes of the Côte-d'Or department
