= Charle (name) =

Charle is a Finnish, French and Swedish masculine given name and nickname that is an alternate form of Charles as well as an English feminine given name and nickname that is a diminutive form of Scarlet and Scarlett. Notable people referred to by this name include the following:

== Given name ==
- Charle Cournoyer (born 1991), Canadian short track speed skater
- Charle Young (born 1951), American football player

== Nickname/Stagename ==
- Charle stage name of Dr. Velmurugan Thangasamy Manohar (born 1960), Indian male actor

== See also ==
- Carle, surnames
- Carle (given name)
- Charl (name)
- Charla (name)
- Charlee (name)
- Charls
