= Charles E. Collins (American football) =

American gridiron football player and coach

- Occupation: American football coach

Charles E. Collins is an American football coach with experience at the high school, community college, and professional levels. Before coaching, he was an All-American football wide receiver at Cal State Northridge University, and played professionally with the Edmonton Eskimos of the Canadian Football League.

Collins is a former NFL assistant, coaching wide receivers for the San Francisco 49ers and Cincinnati Bengals, and the Sacramento Mountain Lions of the United Football League. Most recently, he was affiliated with the football program at Oaks Christian School in Westlake Village, California. As offensive coordinator under head coach Jim Benkert, Collins helped the Lions to the CIF Southern Section Division 2 title in 2017. Following that championship season, Collins succeeded Benkert as head coach and in 2018, Oaks Christian finished the season 12-1 and ranked #8 in the country. In eight seasons, Collins' record was 58 wins against 34 losses with the Lions advancing in the playoffs each year, with his most successful campaign coming in 2018, when Oaks Christian lost to Valencia 28-14 in the Division 5 championship game.

Collins is a current member of the Pro Football Hall of Fame instructional staff where he works with youth American football wide receivers in major cities across the U.S. Collins is called "Coach C." by the athletes he works with. He has been helping high school athletes from all over California earn college scholarships. His coaching career began at Santa Monica Community College, where he worked with Chad "Ochocinco" Johnson and Steve Smith. Collins is known for transforming Johnson from a high school quarterback into a successful wide receiver. Collins' coaching and continued encouragement kept Johnson focused on football allowing him to earn a spot on the Oregon State University team during his final year of eligibility. He was then drafted by the Cincinnati Bengals in 2001, and still accredits his NFL success to Coach Collins. Collins and Johnson remain close and have teamed up to release a wide-receiver training app called "In The Breaks".
