= Charles S. Harris =

American athletic administrator (1951–2022)

Biographical details
- Born: August 22, 1951
- Died: December 7, 2022 (aged 71); Greensboro, North Carolina, US
- Education: Hampton Institute

Administrative career (AD unless noted)
- 1979–1985: Penn
- 1985–1995: Arizona State
- 1996–2002: Mid-Eastern Athletic Conference (commissioner)
- 2004–2021: Averett

Charles Somerville Harris (August 22, 1951–December 7, 2022) was an American athletic and academic administrator. He served as the athletic director of the University of Pennsylvania between 1979 and 1985 and Arizona State University between 1985 and 1995, the first African American man to hold that position, and was the commissioner of the Mid-Eastern Athletic Conference (MEAC) from 1996 to 2002. He finished his career first as the athletic director and later as a vice president at Averett University in Danville, Virginia.

== Career ==
Harris obtained a degree in mass media arts at the Hampton Institute (now Hampton University), where he managed radio station WHOV. He dabbled in journalism, interning for Newsweek and working in the school's department of nursing. At the insistence of a recruiter, he enrolled in the master's degree program at the University of Michigan. The recruiter also helped him get into the school's sports information department, which he preferred to academics. As a result, he abandoned the pursuit of a master's degree, though he listed it on his resume. From 1974 to 1976, Harris served as an assistant to the director, being named assistant athletic director under Don Canham in 1976.

=== University of Pennsylvania ===
In July 1979, the University of Pennsylvania (Penn) named Harris as its new athletic director, replacing Andy Geiger. At 29, he became the youngest athletic director in the Ivy League and its first Black AD. At the time, Penn football had been mired in poor per|rformance, with five winning seasons in Ivy League play within a 20-year stretch.

Under Harris, the financial situation of Penn's athletic department stabilized, and its sports became more competitive. In five years, Penn won 25 Ivy League titles, including nine in 1983–84 alone.

=== Arizona State University ===
On May 7, 1985, Arizona State University (ASU) announced Harris as its new athletic director, replacing Dick Tamburo, who had resigned in March. Harris was the only one of 50 applicants to receive an on-campus interview. He was the first Black athletic director at a major-conference school.

Harris came to an athletic department that was in disarray and ill repute. Tamburo had been forced out after the Pacific-10 Conference had placed Arizona State on probation in five different sports within 21 months. During his time at the university, Harris hired Bruce Snyder and Bill Frieder as coaches for football and men's basketball after prior hirings of Larry Marmie and Steve Patterson failed to yield success.

By the mid-1990s at Arizona State, speculation mounted that Harris's departure was imminent. President Lattie F. Coor resisted pressure from alumni to replace him before the end of his contract, which expired in July 1995. A 1993 external report commissioned by Coor criticized Harris for "a lack of leadership and human-relations skills". While the athletic department had improved its finances, 19 ASU athletes were implicated in criminal proceedings (an issue not typical of Harris's tenure), the university was seen as having higher academic standards than its conference rivals—to its detriment—and Harris was above all seen as aloof and not engaged with the alumni base, which hurt fundraising. The ASU Foundation bought him a membership to the Phoenix Country Club in an attempt to improve this situation, but he rarely attended. Harris interviewed for or was linked to a variety of positions at other power-conference schools, including Florida State University, the University of Virginia, Michigan State University, and the University of Minnesota. In the end, he asked that ASU not renew his contract and departed. The news came the day that Harris was to be named chair of the NCAA Men's Basketball Committee—a position he could no longer hold while not being an athletic director. The Arizona Republic columnist Bob Jacobsen interpreted the departure as a firing after Harris failed to secure a position elsewhere. Harris continued to serve as a special consultant to ASU through November 1995, which allowed Harris to hold the basketball position. After a visit to see his mother in Virginia, Harris had decided to move back east.

=== MEAC and Dartmouth resume scandal ===
In April 1996, Harris was named commissioner of the Mid-Eastern Athletic Conference (MEAC), the second full-time commissioner in league history after Kenneth Free, who had served since 1978. League officials hoped that Harris's media contacts could raise the profile of the conference of historically Black colleges and universities. During his tenure, the MEAC sold a full-season package of football games for television for the first time and increased its net sales revenue tenfold. Two institutions, Hampton University and Norfolk State University, joined as full members, and his efforts shortened the waiting period for new NCAA Division I schools to be eligible for championships from seven years to three. MEAC schools also won their first two NCAA men's basketball tournament games. Harris resigned in 2002 citing the time and travel demands of the position and a desire to return to a college campus.

Harris was hired by Dartmouth College on July 6, 2002, to serve as its new athletic director. He was a surprise pick according to insiders, who considered three of the other four finalists as favorites. it was discovered that his resume had inconsistencies regarding the master's degree he claimed to have earned from Michigan in 1974. This information appeared in published materials from Penn, Arizona State, and the MEAC, and in 2001 articles about Harris again being a finalist for the athletic director position at Virginia. However, Harris told Dartmouth dean James Larimore and reporters for the Valley News newspaper in Lebanon, New Hampshire, that he had not actually obtained a degree. As a result, he resigned five days later. The press conference that was to introduce him to the Dartmouth community instead announced his resignation. The resume falsification was the latest in a series that had affected coaches and athletic administrators including George O'Leary, Tom Collen, and Sandra Baldwin.

=== Averett University ===
Harris was hired by Averett University, a Division III institution in Danville, Virginia, to be its new athletic director in 2004. In 2007, Averett promoted Harris to interim vice president of student services, with a portfolio including student activities, counseling, and residential life.

He retired in 2021 and died December 7, 2022, in Greensboro, North Carolina.
