= Charline Effah =

Gabonese writer and teacher (born 1977)

Charline Patricia Effah
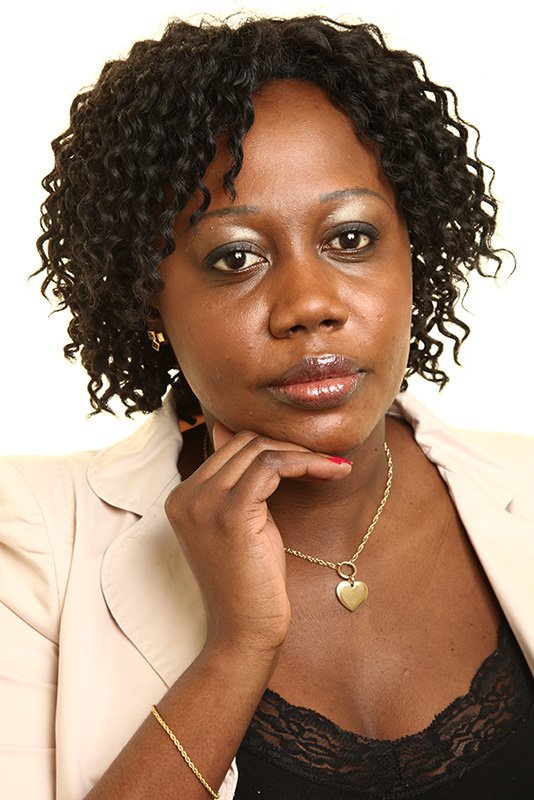
- Born: 1977 (age 48–49); Minvoul, Gabon
- Writing career
- Genre: novel

Charline Patricia Effah (born 1977) is a Gabonese writer and educator living in Paris.

The daughter of a lawyer and a school teacher, she was born in Minvoul and grew up in Libreville. She took part in theatre at Théâtre Express there. A story "La prière du petit Maquisard" received an award in a contest for young authors. In the same year, her poem "Eldorado" won a contest sponsored by the Radio Africa No. 1 program Le cœur et la Plume. She obtained a master's degree in Modern Literature in 2000 and then earned a doctorate at the University of Lille in 2008. She is working as a teacher in Paris.

In 2015, she received the award of merit for literature at the Nuit des Mérites Africain.

== Selected works ==
- Percées et chimères, novel (2011)
- N'être, novel (2014)
- La Danse de Pilar, novel (2018)
- Les Femmes de Bidibidi, novel (2023)
