= Charly (name) =

Charly is an English unisex given name and nickname that is a diminutive form of Charles.

== Given name ==
- Charly Antolini (born 1937), Swiss jazz drummer
- Charly Bouvy (1942 – 2003), Belgian bobsledder
- Charly Dutournier (born 1994), French football player
- Charly Gaul (1932 – 2005), Luxembourgian cyclist
- Charly Grosskost (1944 – 2004), French cyclist
- Charly Loubet, (1946–2023), French football player
- Charly Luske (born 1978), Dutch singer, actor, television presenter and voice actor
- Charly Martin (born 1984), American gridiron football player
- Charly Moussono (born 1984), Cameroonian football player
- Charly Mottet (born 1962), French cyclist
- Charly Ollier (born 1985), French football player
- Charly Runciman (born 1993), Australian rugby player
- Charly Suarez (born 1988), Filipino boxer

== Nickname or stagename ==
- Charly Alberti, stagename of Carlos Alberto Ficicchia Gigliotti (born 1963), Argentine musician
- Charly B, stage name of Charles Blanvillain (born 1981), French singer-songwriter
- Charly Bérard (born 1955), French cyclist
- Charly Black, stagename of Desmond Méndez (born 1980), Jamaican singer
- Charly Charrier (born 1986), French football player
- Charly Chiarelli, nickname of Calogero Chiarelli (born 1948), Canadian writer, storyteller, actor and musician
- Charly Coombes, nickname of John Charles Coombes (born 1980), American-born English singer/songwriter, musician and filmmaker
- Charly Dörfel, nickname of Gert Dörfel (born 1939), German football player
- Charly Flores, nickname Juan Carlos Flores (born 1997), American football player
- Charly Galosi, nickname of Carlos Javier Galosi (born 1975), Argentine ski mountaineer and mountain climber
- Charly García (born Carlos Alberto García, 1951), Argentine singer-songwriter, musician and record producer
- Charly Hertig, nickname of Charles Hertig (1939–2012), Swiss football player and manager
- Charly Höllering, nickname of Charles H. Höllering (born Karl-Heinz Höllering, 1944–2009), German jazz musician
- Charly Hübner, nickname of Carsten Johannes Marcus Hübner (born 1972), German actor
- Charly Konstantinidis, nickname of Charalambos Konstantinidis (born 1985), Belgian football player
- Charly Manson, ring name of Jesús Luna Pozos (born 1975), Mexican luchador
- Mini Charly Manson, ring name of Arturo Santos Hernández (born 1987), Mexican luchador and bodybuilder
- Charly McClain, stage name of Charlotte Denise McClain (born 1956), American singer
- Charly Musonda (footballer, born 1969), nickname of Charles Musonda (born 1969), Zambian footballer
- Charly Musonda (footballer, born 1996), nickname of Charles Musonda (born 1996), Belgian footballer
- Charly "Carlos" Palmer (born 1960), American artist
- Charly Wegelius, nickname of Charles Wegelius (born 1978), Finnish-born British cyclist

== See also ==
- Charly (disambiguation)
- Carly (name)
- Chaly (surname)
- Charl (name)
- Charla (name)
- Charley (disambiguation)
- Charli (disambiguation)
- Charlo (name)
- Charls
- Charly Barranger of Dirtyphonics
- Charly Lownoise and Mental Theo
- Charlye O. Farris
- Charlyn
- Charmy (disambiguation)
- Charny (disambiguation)
- Charyl
- Sharly Mabussi
