= Charlie Walker-Blair =

English rugby union player

- Born: 24 April 1988 (age 38) Kent, England
- Height: 1.92 m (6 ft 4 in)
- Weight: 104 kg (16 st 5 lb)
- School: West Somerset Community College

Rugby union career
- Position: Flanker
- Current team: Sale Sharks
Senior career
| Years | Team | Apps | (Points) |
| 2008–2012 | Exeter Chiefs | | |
| 2011–2012 | Cornish Pirates | | |
| 2012 | Taunton | | |
| 2013 | Jersey | | |
| 2013– | Sale Sharks | | |

Charlie Walker-Blair (born 24 April 1988) is an English rugby union footballer who plays as a flanker. He currently plays for Sale Sharks. He has suffered through his career with an anterior cruciate ligament injury.

== Early life ==
Born in Kent, he started playing rugby at 15, playing for Taunton and Minehead Barbarians at winger. He went to school at West Somerset Community College, but at the age of 17 went to New Zealand and played for East Coast; in 2008 he returned to play for Carterton.

== Club career ==
He played for Exeter, but he injured himself in his first year, which led to a year out. He returned in 2011 and was dual-registered with Cornish Pirates, but re-ruptured his anterior cruciate ligament and needed another operation, after only playing 12 games. To ease back into rugby he signed for Taunton. On 24 February 2013 he signed for Jersey in the RFU Championship. On 29 April 2013, he signed a deal to join Sale Sharks in the Aviva Premiership.
