= Charlie Young (footballer, born 1918) =

Australian rules footballer (1918–1969)

Personal information
- Full name: Charles William Young
- Born: 10 October 1918; Fitzroy North, Victoria
- Died: 22 March 1969 (aged 50); Port Welshpool, Victoria
- Original team: North Carlton
- Height: 163 cm (5 ft 4 in)
- Weight: 61 kg (134 lb)

Playing career^{1}
Years	Club	Games (Goals)
1937	Fitzroy	2 (0)
- ^{1} Playing statistics correct to the end of 1937.

Charles William Young (10 October 1918 – 22 March 1969) was an Australian rules footballer who played with Fitzroy in the Victorian Football League (VFL).

== Family ==
He married Lucy Carmel Thomas in 1943.

== Military service ==
He enlisted in the Second AIF on 13 May 1943.

== Death ==
He died instantly from injuries he sustained in a massive explosion on the seismic survey ship Western Spruce at Port Welshpool on 22 March 1969.
