= West Somerset College =

West Somerset
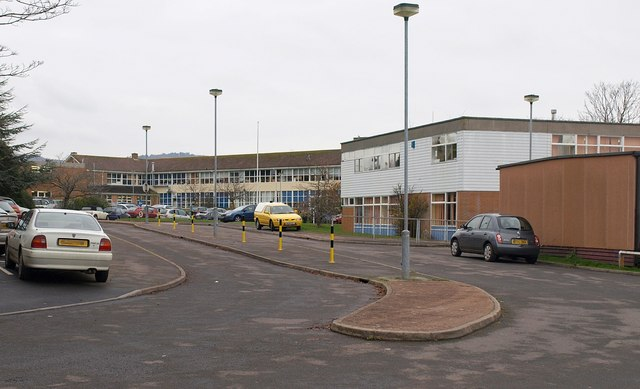

Location
- Bircham Road; Alcombe, Minehead, Somerset, TA24 6AY; England
- Coordinates: 51.1964°N 3.4621°W

Information
- Type: Academy
- Motto: Qui audet, vincit (He who dares, wins)
- Department for Education URN: 136791 Tables
- Ofsted: Reports
- Principal: Nicola Doughty
- Gender: Mixed
- Age: 13 to 19
- Enrolment: 1,111
- Capacity: 1,509
- Houses: 4
- Website: www.westsomersetcollege.org

West Somerset College (is sometimes abbreviated to WSC and was previously known as West Somerset Community College prior to the college re-brand in September 2013) is a fairly large secondary school in Minehead, Somerset, England. It provides education for pupils aged 13 to 16 (school years 9–11) in the main school and 16 to 18 (school years 12–13) in the sixth form (West Somerset uses a three-tier school system). WSC has had Technology College status for several years, meaning the college receives additional funding. In June 2011, the school became an Academy. The school has a partnership with a secondary school (Gymnasium) in Bünde, Germany.

The College was placed into special measures following an October 2014 Ofsted report judging the College to be 'inadequate.' This status was lifted in May 2016 following 'significant improvements.'

The College was subsequently placed third best in Somerset for progress in GCSE results in the DFE 2017 league table.

== Catchment Area ==
West Somerset College is the only secondary school serving the district of West Somerset. The 660km2 catchment area includes two thirds of the Exmoor National Park and part of the Quantock Hills Area of Outstanding Natural Beauty as well as the coastal towns of Minehead and Watchet.

The feeder schools for West Somerset College are:

- Minehead Middle School
- Danesfield C of E Middle School
- Dulverton Middle and Community School

== Facilities ==
The school is housed in a number of buildings of various ages. There are separate buildings for the Sixth Form block, common room for Sixth Form pupils, Skills and Enterprise Centre which was opened in 2008. The Skills and Enterprise building allows pupils to study subjects like, Hair and Beauty, Hairdressing, Hospitality, Animal Care, Construction etc.

All classrooms have digital projectors and some classrooms have interactive whiteboards with laptops and/or PCs available for use by pupils.
