= Charlie Zinnick =

Australian rules footballer (1896–1967)

Charles Zinnick

Personal information
- Full name: Charles Frederick Zinnick
- Nickname: Chook
- Born: 31 March 1896; Birkenhead, South Australia
- Died: 5 August 1967 (aged 71); Footscray Hospital, Footscray, Victoria
- Original team: Yarraville

Playing career^{1}
Years	Club	Games (Goals)
1921	Essendon	13 (0)
1925	Footscray	1 (0)
Total		14 (0)
- ^{1} Playing statistics correct to the end of 1925.

Charles Frederick "Chook" Zinnick (31 March 1896 – 5 August 1967) was an Australian rules footballer who played with Essendon and Footscray.

== Family ==
The son of Anton August Zinnack (1856-1915), and Elizabeth Zinnack (1862-1912), née Dewson, Carl Frederick Zinnack was born at Birkenhead, South Australia on 31 March 1896.

== Football ==
=== Yarraville (VJFA) ===
1914, 1919, 1922,

=== Essendon (VFL) ===
1921. After a short career of 13 games at Essendon, Zinnick moved to Footscray where he played while the club was in the Victorian Football Association.

=== Footscray (VFA) ===
1922-1924

=== Footscray (VFL) ===
He played only one further VFL game before retiring shortly after Footscray joined the Victorian Football League in 1925.

== Death ==
He died at the Footscray Hospital, in Footscray, Victoria on 5 August 1967.
