= Charlin (name) =

Charlin is a given name and a surname. As a surname, it is derived from Charles. Notable people with the name include the following:

== Surname ==
- André Charlin (1903–1983), French audio engineer
- Paco Charlín (bass player), member of the British pop-rock band Immaculate Fools
- Stéphane Charlin (born 2000), Swiss ice hockey player
- Manuel, María Teresa, Melchor, Yolanda, Josefa, of the Charlín surname; members of the criminal gang Os Charlins

== Given name ==
- Charlin Vargas, Dominican beach volleyball player
- Michel Charlin Tcheumaleu (born 1975), Cameroonian soccer player
- Louise Charlin Perrin Labe (1524–1566), French poet

== Fictional characters ==
- Manuel, Paquito, Pilar, Moncho, Leticia, of the surname Charlin, fictional characters from the Spanish TV crime drama Fariña (TV series)

== See also ==
- Carlin (name)
- Chalin (disambiguation)
- Chaplin (name)
- Charbin (disambiguation)
- Charlin (disambiguation)
- Charli (name)
- Charlie (given name)
- Charlin (disambiguation)
- Charline (name)
- Charlyn
