= Charlie Vignoles =

Anglo-Argentine cricketer

Personal information
- Full name: Charles L. Vignoles
- Born: c. 1914
- Died: 26 July 1976; La Cumbre, Córdoba, Argentina
- Batting: Unknown
- Bowling: Unknown

Career statistics
| Competition | First-class |
|---|---|
| Matches | 2 |
| Runs scored | 75 |
| Batting average | 18.75 |
| 100s/50s | –/– |
| Top score | 45 |
| Balls bowled | 54 |
| Wickets | 0 |
| Bowling average | – |
| 5 wickets in innings | – |
| 10 wickets in match | – |
| Best bowling | – |
| Catches/stumpings | 1/– |
- Source: Cricinfo, 29 January 2022

Charles L. Vignoles (date of birth not known — 26 July 1976) was an Anglo-Argentine first-class cricketer.

Vignoles played first-class cricket for Argentina in January 1938, making two appearances against Sir T. E. W. Brinckman's XI. Playing as a middle order batsman, he scored 75 runs in his two matches, with a highest score of 45; this score came in his first match at the Hurlingham Club. Vignoles died at La Cumbre in Córdoba Province in July 1976.
