= Charlie Ware (footballer) =

English footballer (1931–2017)

Personal information
- Full name: Charles Ware
- Date of birth: 9 March 1931
- Place of birth: York, England
- Date of death: November 2017 (aged 86)
- Place of death: York, England
- Height: 5 ft 7 1/2 in (1.71 m)
- Position: Winger

Senior career*
Years	Team	Apps	(Gls)
- Cliftonville
1948–1954	York City	9	(0)
1954–1956	Scarborough		
Total		9	(0)
- * Club domestic league appearances and goals

Charles Ware (9 March 1931 - November 2017) was an English professional footballer who played as a winger in the Football League for York City, and in non-League football for Cliftonville and Scarborough.
