= Charlene Almarvez =

Filipino fashion model

- Born: Charlene Louise Alagon Almarvez; January 25, 1993 (age 33); Laguna, Philippines
- Other name: Chat
- Modeling information
- Height: 5 ft 11 in (1.80 m)
- Hair color: Black
- Eye color: Brown
- Agency: Ford Models (New York, Paris, Chicago, Los Angeles); Traffic Models (Barcelona)

Charlene Louise Alagon Almarvez is a Filipina fashion model from Laguna who placed second at the Ford Supermodel of the World 2010, winning a US$150,000 modeling representation courtesy of Ford Models in New York.

== Career ==
Almarvez had her start in the fashion industry after winning the Ford Supermodel of the World Philippines 2009 search and represented the Philippines in São Paulo, Brazil in 2010 placing second, which was the country's highest placement in the competition by that time. She won a US$150,000 contract for a Ford Models representation.

She has appeared in editorials for many fashion magazine including the Chinese Vogue, V, Teen Vogue, Russian edition of Elle, The New York Times T Magazine by KT Achuleta, US Glamour, Glamour Italia, Glamour UK, A Magazine, Wonderland Magazine and US Town and Country. In local scene she appeared on the cover of Zone Magazine, Wedding Essentials Magazine, Sense & Style, and MEGA Magazine, and has appeared on the editorials of Preview and Mega Magazine in the Philippines

Almarvez had her debut in the New York Fashion Week Fall 2010 walking for Diane Von Furstenberg, Sophie Theallet and Peter Som. She also walked the runways for Lacoste, Cynthia Steffe, Wayne Lee and Rachel Comey. She had three shows at the Resort 2011 collection in New York for Lela Rose, Ports 1961 and again for Diane Von Furstenberg.

== 2012 ==
Almarvez did an ad for Hush Puppies for their S/S 12 campaign. In fall 2012, she walked for a total of 13 designers during New York Fashion Week including Nanette Lepore, Miguel Adrover, Ruffian, Mara Hoffman, and The Blonds

March 2012, she appeared for an editorial "techno sports" for the March issue of Glamour Italia photographed by Hans Feurer.

August 2012, she and Yasmin Bidois appeared on an editorial "Wahine" for The Ones2watch photographed by Xi Sinsong. She also appeared on an editorial photographed by Rokas Darulis for U+Mag UK.

September 2012, she also appeared in an editorial "1,2,3...Smile" for the September issue of Glamour UK with Vilde Gotschalksen shot by Chris Craymer. On the same month she also did an editorial for Glamour USA with Lydia Carron.

October 2012, she had an editorial for NY Times T Magazine with Kate King, Hannah Holman, Kremi Otashliyska, and Juliana Schurig.

== 2013 ==
Almarvez booked campaign for UK brand Primark.

She walked for NYFW Spring 2014 for designers such as Lela Rose and Bibhu Mohapatra.

Almarvez landed editorials for Meg Magazine Philippines, Cosmo Philippines

== 2014 ==
Almarvez appeared on an editorial for Seventeen Magazine USA. She's also in an editorial in Schon Magazine Online. Also, she is seen in an editorial for Bonbon Magazine.

She moved from Elite Paris to Ford Paris.

She recently appeared on Sam Edelman S/S 2015 Campaign alongside Josephine Skriver and Rossy Herrera.
