= Charlie Warde =

British painter (born 1974)

- Born: 1974 (age 51–52); London, United Kingdom
- Education: City and Guilds of London Art School, London
- Known for: Painter, sculptor
- Notable work: Memorandum (Robin Hood Gardens)
- Movement: Abstract art, etching, sculptor, Film
- Website: http://charliewarde.com

Charlie Warde (born 1974) is a British painter.

== Early life and family ==
Charlie Warde, is a London-based artist born in Hammersmith, London.

== Notable works ==
Memorandum (Robin Hood Gardens) gold plated etched copper plate created in an edition of nine, with number one of the edition acquired by the V&A Museum for its permanent collection.
