= Chubin (surname) =

Chubin is a surname. Notable people with the surname include:

- Shahram Chubin, Swiss author and academic
- Steve Chubin (born 1944), American basketball player
- Yakov Chubin (1893–1956), Soviet politician
