= Charlize =

Charlize is a feminine given name of South African origin. Notable people with the name include:

- Charlize Rule (born 2003), Australian soccer player
- Charlize Theron (born 1975), South African-American actress and producer
- Charlize van der Westhuizen (born 1984), South African cricketer

== See also ==
- Charlise Mutten
