= Charlie Winfield =

English footballer

Personal information
- Full name: Charlie James Winfield
- Date of birth: 8 May 2002 (age 24)
- Height: 1.71 m (5 ft 7 in)
- Positions: Left-back; midfielder

Youth career
- 2012–2023: Barnsley

Senior career*
Years	Team	Apps	(Gls)
2023–2024	Barnsley	0	(0)
2021	→ Esbjerg fB (loan)	14	(1)
2023	→ Alfreton Town (loan)	1	(0)
2023	→ Darlington (loan)	1	(0)
2024–2025	Worksop Town	6	(1)
2024–2025	→ Bridlington Town (loan)	32	(2)
- * Club domestic league appearances and goals as of 15:13, 18 May 2025 (UTC)

Charlie James Winfield (born 8 May 2002) is an English professional footballer who plays as a defender.

== Career ==
Winfield joined Barnsley in November 2023 and signed a first-year scholar in 2018. He joined Danish 2nd Division club Esbjerg fB on loan in 2021, playing 16 games for the club. However, he suffered a serious knee injury in December 2021. On 10 February 2023, he joined Alfreton Town on loan. He made his first-team debut for Barnsley on 8 August 2023, in a 2–2 draw with Tranmere Rovers in an EFL Cup match at Oakwell, providing an assist for Aiden Marsh. On 27 October 2023, he joined Darlington on a one-month loan. The loan deal was not extended.

On 13 July 2024, Winfield joined Northern Premier League Premier Division side Worksop Town. In September 2024, he joined Bridlington Town on a loan deal which has lasted 4 months. Following Worksop Town's promotion, he departed the club at the end of the 2024–25 season.

== Style of play ==
Winfield operates as a left-back or as a central midfielder. He is known for his pace and tough-tackling.

== Career statistics ==
As of end of 2024–25 season

Appearances and goals by club, season and competition
Club	Season	League			FA Cup		EFL Cup		Other		Total	
Club	Season	Division	Apps	Goals	Apps	Goals	Apps	Goals	Apps	Goals	Apps	Goals
Barnsley	2023–24	League One	0	0	0	0	1	0	0	0	1	0
Worksop Town	2024–25	NPL Premier Division	6	1	2	0	—		1 (Note: Appearance(s) in Sheffield & Hallamshire Senior Cup)	0	9	1
Bridlington Town (loan)	2024–25	NPL Division One East	32	2	0	0	—		0	0	32	2
Career total			38	3	2	0	1	0	1	0	42	3
