= Charlie Collins =

Charlie Collins may refer to:

== Football ==
- Charlie Collins (Canadian football) (1946–2012), Canadian football player
- Charlie Collins (footballer) (born 1991), English footballer

== Other people ==
- Charlie Collins (musician), Australian singer (born Charlene Joyce Bailey)
- Charlie Collins (politician) (born 1962), American politician

== See also ==
- Charles Collins (disambiguation)
