= Chare =

Narrow medieval street or alley

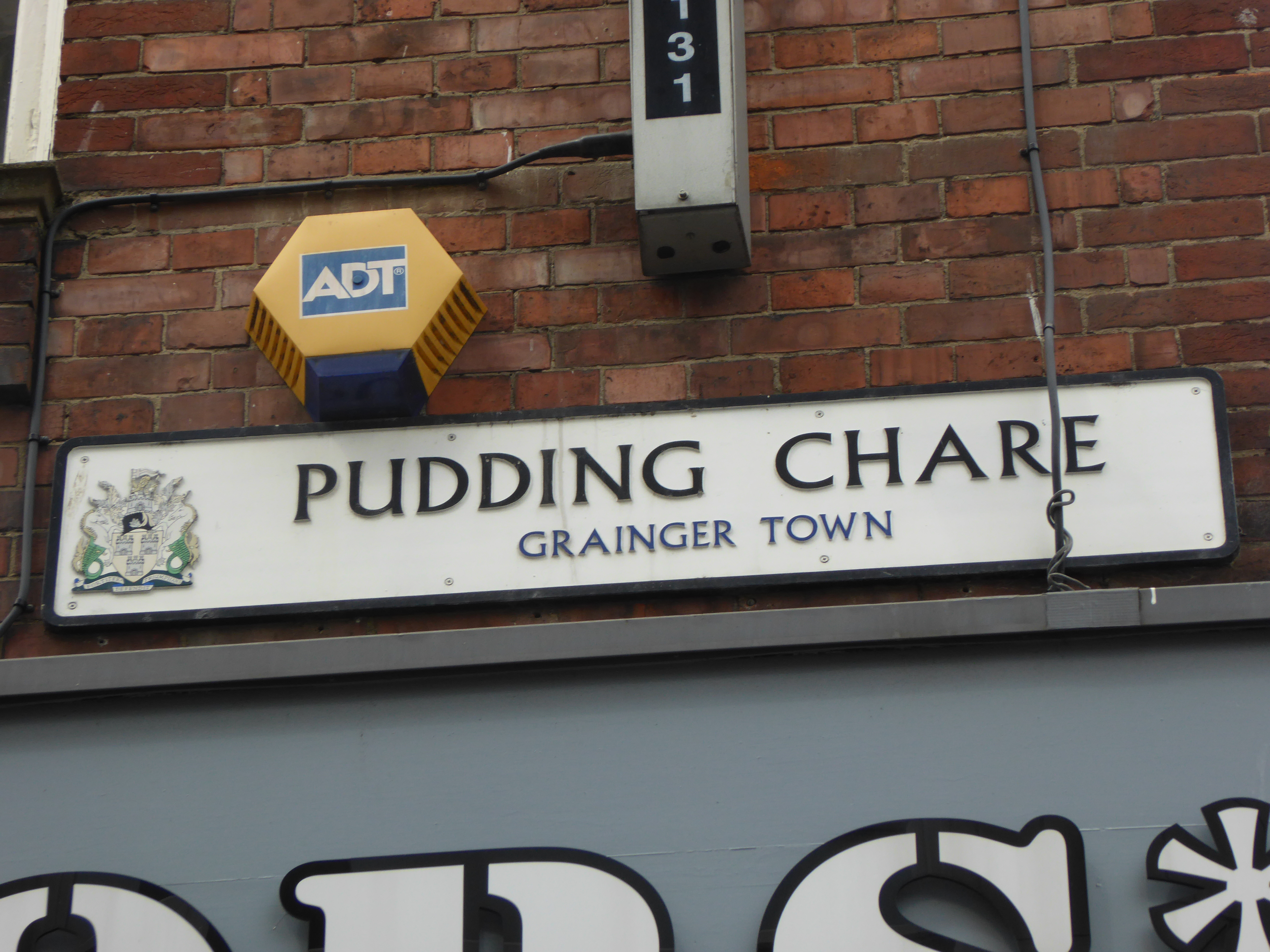
Pudding Chare, Newcastle upon Tyne

A chare, in the dialect of North-east England, is a narrow medieval street or alley.

== Newcastle upon Tyne ==
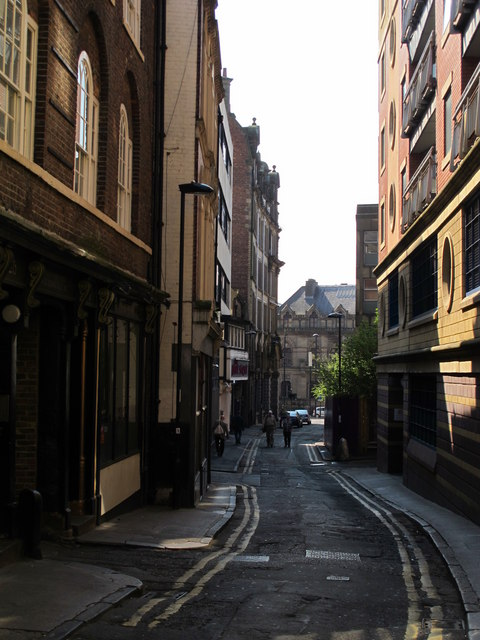
Pudding Chare

Chares and much of the layout of Newcastle's Quayside date from medieval times. At one point, there were 20 chares in Newcastle. After the great fire of Newcastle and Gateshead in 1854, a number of the chares were permanently removed although many remain in existence today. Chares also are still present in the higher parts of the city centre.

According to "Quayside and the Chares" by Jack and John Leslie, chares reflected their name or residents. "Names might change over the years, including Armourer's Chare which become Colvin's Chare". Originally inhabited by wealthy merchants, the chares became slums as they were deserted due to their "dark, cramped conditions". The chares were infamous for their insanitary conditions - typhus was "epidemic" and there were three cholera outbreaks in 1831-2, 1848-9 and finally in 1853 (which killed over 1,500 people).

=== Chares destroyed by the Great Fire ===
A number of chares were destroyed beyond repair as a result of the fire and are no longer extant. The chares that were not rebuilt were replaced by Queen Street, King Street and Lombard Street.

Hornsby's Chare, formerly named Maryon House Chare, Colvin's Chare, formerly Black Boy's Chare, Pallister's Chare, formerly Armourer's Chare, Blue Anchor Chare, also known as Blew Anchor Chare, Peppercorn Chare and Grinding Chare, also known as Grandon/Grandin Chare were destroyed and no longer exist.

Dark Chare, the first of the alleys by Sandhill and described by in 1827 by Eneas Mackenzie, was also destroyed. He said of Dark Chare that "a stout person would find it rather inconvenient to press through the upper part of this lane. It is very properly termed the Dark Chare, for the houses at the top nearly touch each other. It is not now used as a thoroughfare. It has been justly observed, that the ground occupied by these chares is the most crowded with buildings of any part in his majesty's dominions."

=== Still in existence ===
On the Quayside, there are a large number of chares still in existence. Many of them are now just narrow alleyways and routes although some of them have been widened and their uses have been extended because of it:

- Breakneck Stairs - still exist as stairs between Close and Hanover Street. They now form part of a city-centre flats development based upon the extant Bonded Warehouse development.
- Tuthill Stairs - recently upgraded and extant. It was recently rebuilt and modernised as part of the Quayside Lofts project.
- Long Stairs - lead up to the Moot Hall and start between the 15th century Cooperage and 16th century "Buttress" merchant's house.
- Castle Stairs - runs up from the end of Close and start of Sandhill to the Black Gate and Castle Keep
- Plummer Chare - according to Eneas Mackenzie, "the receptacle of Cyprian nymphs, whose blandishments were of the most coarse and vulgar description. Indeed, most of these dark lanes were inhabited by "very dangerous, though not very tempting females." Now, the chare exists as a narrow alley between King Street and Fenwick's Entry.
- Fenwick's Entry, formerly called Kirk Chare - now a main entrance to the modern development behind Quayside. In its original incarnation before the fire, "Cuthbert Fenwick, Esq. alderman, who resided in the upper part of the chare; for, however confined, dirty, and disagreeable these alleys may now seem, they formerly contained some of the best houses in the town, and were inhabited by opulent merchants, particularly those engaged in the coal-trade."
- Broad Garth - was one of the main chares behind Quayside and is now a residential street name in the modern 1980s development. Until the great fire, its use had shifted from residential to warehousing usage.
- Trinity Chare, formerly called Dalton's Place - a narrow alley leading to the Live Theatre rehearsal rooms and a number of almshouses dating from the 18th century.
- Cox Chare - formerly known as Coxton's Chare or Cockis Chare, now a road leading from Pandon to Quayside, and was previously much narrower and surrounded by warehouses
- Love Lane - previously called Gowerley's Rawe, was replaced by warehouses which were eventually converted to apartments
- Milk Market - now the side of the conversion into apartments of the warehouses of Johnson, Dodds and Company Limited.

Other than on the riverside, there are a number of chares in existence in the higher parts of the city:

- Pudding Chare - runs from Bigg Market to Neville Street and contains some off-street examples of the medieval city.
- Denton Chare - formerly known as the Iron Market, connects St Nicholas Street to Neville Street.
- Pink Lane - a very narrow alley stretching Clayton Street West and Westgate Road. It is best known for containing the excavated foundations of Gunner Tower, part of the ancient Newcastle town wall.

Other chares on the Quayside that remains are Wrangham's Entry, Spencer's Entry, the Swirle, Flag Chare and Anchor Chare. These reconstructed chares exist on the Sandgate/East Quayside modern office developments.

== Elsewhere in north-east England ==
- Bishop Auckland - Durham Chare
- Bishop Auckland - Gib Chare
- Chester-le-Street - High Chare, Middle Chare, Low Chare, Church Chare,(54.855944°N 1.571972°W)
- Corbridge - St Mary's Chare
- Durham - Castle Chare
- Hartlepool - St Hilda's Chare
- Hexham - St Mary's Chare
- Morpeth - Copper Chare
- Newton Aycliffe - Clarence Chare - Newton Aycliffe is a new town, therefore not a Chare in the traditional sense.
- Peterlee - The Chare, Upper Chare - as with Newton Aycliffe, Peterlee's Chares are in name only
- Whitburn - Sandy Chare
- Holy Island - Chare Ends

== See also ==
- Alley § Other terms
