= Chubin Dar =

Neighborhood in Qazvin province, Iran

Chubin Dar Persian: چوبيندر
- Neighborhood
- Location within Iran
- Coordinates: 36°13′42″N 49°56′59″E
- Country: Iran
- Province: Qazvin
- County: Qazvin
- District: Central
- City: Qazvin

Population (2006)
  - Total: 8,083
- Time zone: UTC+3:30 (IRST)

Chubin Dar (Persian: چوبيندر) (Note: Also romanized as Choobindar and Chūbīn Dar; also known as Chūbīn, Chundar, and Jūbīn Dar) is a neighborhood in the city of Qazvin in the Central District of Qazvin County, Qazvin province, Iran.

== Demographics ==
=== Population ===
At the time of the 2006 National Census, Chubin Dar's population was 8,083 in 1,904 households, when it was a village in Eqbal-e Gharbi Rural District. The village has been annexed to the city of Qazvin.
