= Charlie Wooldridge =

American baseball player (1897–1982)

- Outfielder/First baseman
- Born: Charles Walton Wooldridge; August 10, 1897; Allensville, Kentucky, U.S.
- Died: September 1982; aged 85; Everettsville, Virginia, U.S.

Negro league baseball debut
- 1928, Cleveland Tigers

Last appearance
- 1928, for the Cleveland Tigers

Teams
- Cleveland Tigers (1928)

Charles Walton Wooldridge (August 10, 1897 – September 1982) was an American Negro league outfielder/first baseman in the 1920s.

== Early life and career ==
A native of Allensville, Kentucky, Wooldridge made his Negro leagues debut in 1928 with the Cleveland Tigers. From 1931 through 1932, he played with the Scranton Progressive Colored Giants.
