= Zubin =

- Gender: Male

Origin
- Origin: Persian
- Meaning: "The Man Who Touched The Sky" or short spear
- Region of origin: Iran

Other names
- Related names: Chubin, Joubin, Zubeen, Zhubin

Zubin (Persian: زوبین) is a Persian male given name which refers to a type of short spear in Persian. In Persian mythology, Zubin (also called: Zupin, Zhubin, Zhupin) was a legendary Persian warrior famous for his courage and military command, lending to the meaning of "the man who touched the sky." Variants of the name include Chubin (چوبین), Joubin (ژوبین), Jubin, Zubeen, and Zhubin.

The name Zubin may refer to:

== Given name ==
- Zubin Damania (born 1973), American physician, comedian, internet personality, musician, and founder of Turntable Health
- Zubin Garg (1972-2025), Indian musician and actor
- Zubin Mehta (born 1936), Indian conductor
- Zubin Muncherji, Singapore athlete
- Zubin Nautiyal (born 1989), Indian singer
- Zubin Sedghi (born 1984), Persian-American neuroscientist and bassist
- Zubin Surkari (born 1980), Canadian cricketer
- Zubin Varla (born 1970), British actor and singer

== Surname ==
- Emil Zubin (born 1977), Slovenian footballer
- Joseph Zubin (1900–1990) American psychologist

== Place ==
- Zubin Potok in North Kosovo

== See also ==
- Joseph Zubin Award
- The Zubin Foundation
