= Charlie Wanhope =

Australian rules footballer

Personal information
- Full name: Victor George Wanhope
- Born: 14 August 1934
- Died: 4 April 2016 (aged 81)
- Original team: Diamond Creek
- Height: 183 cm (6 ft 0 in)
- Weight: 83 kg (183 lb)

Playing career^{1}
Years	Club	Games (Goals)
1953–54	Fitzroy	4 (0)
- ^{1} Playing statistics correct to the end of 1954.

Charlie Wanhope (14 August 1934 – 4 April 2016) was an Australian rules footballer who played with Fitzroy in the Victorian Football League (VFL).
