= Charlie Wiedemeyer =

American baseball player (1914–1979)

- Pitcher
- Born: January 31, 1914; Chicago, Illinois
- Died: October 27, 1979 (aged 65); Lake Geneva, Florida
- Batted: Left Threw: Left

MLB debut
- September 9, 1934, for the Chicago Cubs

Last MLB appearance
- September 30, 1934, for the Chicago Cubs

MLB statistics
- Win–loss record: 0–0
- Earned run average: 9.72
- Strikeouts: 2
- Stats at Baseball Reference

Teams
- Chicago Cubs (1934)

Charles John Wiedemeyer (January 31, 1914 – October 27, 1979), nicknamed "Chick", was a Major League Baseball pitcher who played for one season. He pitched for the Chicago Cubs in four games during the 1934 Chicago Cubs season.
