= Charles Edward Harris =

American politician

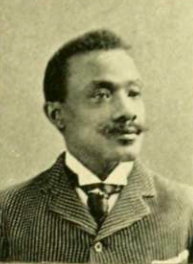

Charles Edward Harris was a state legislator in Massachusetts in 1892 and 1893. He was born in Boston. He served on the Common Council. He lived at No. 24 Phillips Street. He was a Republican.
