= Charlie Whitely =

Australian rules footballer (1904–1953)

Personal information
- Full name: Charles Eric Whitely
- Born: 12 January 1904; Albury, New South Wales
- Died: 12 September 1953 (aged 49); Yarra Junction, Victoria
- Original teams: Hume Weir (O&MFL)
- Height: 173 cm (5 ft 8 in)
- Weight: 68 kg (150 lb)

Playing career^{1}
Years	Club	Games (Goals)
1925	Richmond	1 (0)
1926	Hawthorn	1 (1)
1926–27	Prahran (VFA)	6 (2)
1927–32	Brunswick (VFA)	79 (18)
- ^{1} Playing statistics correct to the end of 1932.

Charles Eric Whitely (12 January 1904 – 12 September 1953) was an Australian rules footballer who played with Richmond and Hawthorn in the Victorian Football League (VFL).

== Early life ==
The son of William Albert James Whitely (1873–1943) and Elizabeth Mary Whitely, née Babbington (1873–1953), Charles Eric Whitely was born at Albury on 12 January 1904.

== Football ==
Whitely was a lightly built wingman and half-forward who had a neat left foot stab-pass.

He commenced his football career with the Hume Weir club in the Ovens & Murray Football League where he played from 1922 to 1924.

In 1925 Whitely joined Richmond, making his solitary appearance in the senior team in their loss to Carlton.

He transferred to Hawthorn for the 1926 VFL season and scored a goal on debut against St Kilda but also fractured a rib and never again played a VFL match.

Whitely later transferred to Prahran and then Brunswick in the Victorian Football Association.

== Later life ==
In 1926 Charles Whitely married Thelma Sedgman and they lived in Melbourne with Whitely working as a mechanic until they moved to the Yarra Junction area in the early 1950s.

Charles Eric Whitely died in September 1953 and was cremated at Fawkner Memorial Park.
