= Charli, Rajasthan =

Charli
- rural
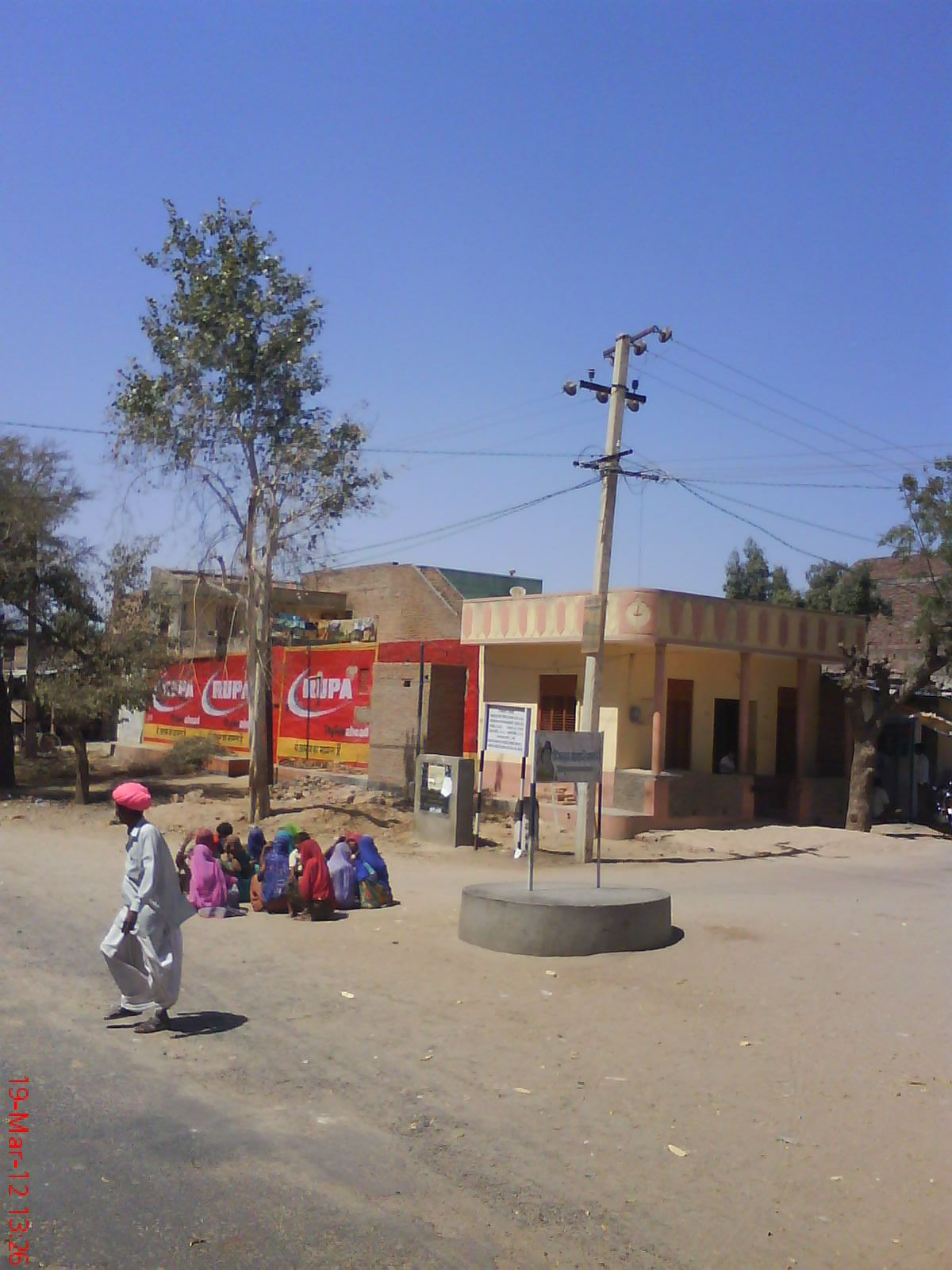
- Bus stand of Charli

- Location in Rajasthan, India Charli (India)
- Coordinates: 25°21′N 72°49′E
- Country: India
- State: Rajasthan
- District: Jalor

Population (2010)
  - Total: 4,000

Languages marwadi
  - Official: Hindi
- Time zone: UTC+5:30 (IST)
- PIN: 307029
- Telephone code: +912978
- ISO 3166 code: RJ-IN
- Vehicle registration: RJ-16
- Sex ratio: 998 ♂/♀

Charli is a village in Ahore tehsil of Jalore District of Rajasthan state in India. It is situated on Jalore-Sanderao road (SH-16).

== Demographics ==
Population of Charli is 3115 according to census 2001. Where male population is 1559 and the female population is 1556.
