= Charles Collins (Rhode Island politician) =

American politician and public official

Charles Collins (1773 – June 9, 1845) was an American politician and public official in the state of Rhode Island. He is best known today for his collusion with the slave-trading DeWolf family while serving as collector of the port of Bristol.

== Life ==
Collins was the son of Charles Collins (1745–1818) and Hannah (Turner) Collins (1750–1795) of Warren, Rhode Island. Sometime before 1801 (when their first child was born) Collins was married to Lydia Bradford (1773–1854) and was therefore connected by marriage to James DeWolf, a prominent Rhode Island politician, merchant, and slave trader.

Collins was the captain of the Lucy, a schooner owned by DeWolf that was seized in 1799 by William Ellery, the Newport customs collector, as a slave ship. The DeWolfs recovered the ship by kidnapping Ellery's agent who was going to bid on it at auction and having a straw buyer buy it back cheaply.

The efforts of the DeWolfs and others to avoid enforcement efforts by Ellery led to the establishment of a new customs district based at Bristol in 1801, and Collins was appointed collector there in 1804, after pressure from the DeWolfs led to the removal of the first appointee, Jonathan Russell. The DeWolfs were major supporters of President Thomas Jefferson. After 1808 James DeWolf left the slave trade, but his nephew George DeWolf continued his involvement. Collins brought no actions against slave traders during his time as customs commissioner. He was removed in 1820.

In 1822 George DeWolf was promoted to the position of Major-General of the Rhode Island militia by the legislature, and Collins was given DeWolf's former position as Brigadier-General of the First Brigade. From 1824 to 1833 Collins was elected lieutenant governor, serving under governors James Fenner and Lemuel H. Arnold. By this time the power of the DeWolfs was waning - James left the United States Senate in 1825, George fled the country to avoid debts in the same year, and James died in 1837.

== Personal life ==
Collins married Lydia Bradford (1773–1854), daughter of William Bradford (1729–1808), a deputy governor and U. S. Senator from Rhode Island. They had a number of children, many of whom died young, with the exception of Caroline Collins Torrey (1801–1855) and Lydia Bradford Collins Van Zandt, mother of Rhode Island governor Charles C. Van Zandt (1830–1894).

Collins is buried in Island Cemetery in Newport, Rhode Island.
