= Charline (name) =

Charline is a French feminine given name and a French feminine form of Charles.

== Given names ==
- Charline Arthur (1929–1987), American singer
- Charline Effah (born 1977), Gabonese writer
- Charline Joiner (born 1988), Scottish cyclist
- Charline Labonté (born 1982), Canadian ice hockey player
- Charline Mathias (born 1992), Luxembourgish middle-distance athlete
- Charline Picon (born 1984), French windsurfer
- Charline Van Snick (born 1990), Belgian judoka
- Charline von Heyl (born 1960), German painter
- Charline White (1920–1959), first African-American woman to be elected to the Michigan Legislature

== See also ==
- Charlaine
- Charlene (given name)
- Charlie (name)
- Charlin (name)
- Charlyne
