= Charles Harris (painter) =

British painter, art instructor and teacher

Charles Harris is a British painter, art instructor and teacher.

Harris is a British traditional artist who trained at the Royal Academy in London. He founded a movement called "New Traditional Art" and the Association Embracing Realist Art (AERA). He predominantly paints his landscapes en plein air and his portraits in front of his subjects.

== Personal life ==
Charles Harris completed both his BA and his MA at the Royal Academy. He was awarded a scholarship to the Royal Academy for both of these courses and has won several prizes during those years.

A British art critic, Brian Sewell commented on how Harris had "modestly eschewed these major prizes" in a review where he chose Harris as being, "One of the six best painters for the future." Harris devoted much of his time to Art History under the tutelage of Prof. David Morris, former Royal Academy of Arts Historian. In support of his study, Harris spent most of his lunch hours at the National Gallery in Trafalgar Square, London. In his third year at the Academy Harris was elected to the Livery in the Guild of Painter-Stainers and awarded the Freedom of the City of London becoming their youngest member at the time. Harris wrote and presented a paper for the Worshipful Company of Painter-Stainers entitled: ‘The Necessity of Traditional Art’. This speech was subsequently incorporated into the curriculum of – The University of North Carolina at Chapel Hill. The late Peter Greenham RA, Former Keeper of the Royal Academy once said about Harris "Anyone wishing to pursue Traditional Art will find himself swimming against a stream of insensitive Modernism." This is also reflected in an article in The Scotsman.

Upon leaving the Royal Academy, Harris began painting the portraits of many famous people as well as staging a series of one-man exhibitions in London and Surrey. Over an extensive period, he regularly received official portrait commissions from the worlds of Politics, the Church, the Military, Business, Entertainment, the Arts, Sport and Education.

== Teaching career ==
Harris taught at every standard and level, from reception class, to sixth form in schools, plus talks and lectures at colleges and universities. His almost unbroken period of teaching and lecturing continues to the present day with Masterclasses and seminars overseas. Harris also pioneered the first ‘Artist in Residence’ scheme in schools, which was featured on a BBC Six O’Clock News programme.

In 1989 four years after finishing at the Royal Academy, Harris was awarded a Senior Academic Cultural Exchange Visit to Russia. Harris had to study Russian for 18 months to be able to qualify for this Award. He represented Great Britain visiting Moscow, St. Petersburg, Pavlosk and the Baltic Coast with a speaking engagement at the Repin Institute of Arts in St. Petersburg. Harris co-founded the ‘New Human Realists for New Traditional Art’ with Prof. David Morris, former Royal Academy Art Historian. They staged a huge exhibition of artworks, entitled ‘Artists For Peace’ Exhibition in Picadilly, London.

Harris has made submissions to a number of the Professional Societies at the Mall Galleries, including – the Royal Society of British Artists, the Royal Institute of Oil Painters, the Royal Society of Portrait Painters, the Royal Institute of Painters in Water-colours, the Pastel Society, the Freestanding Painters and Sculptors, the United Society of Artists, the New English Art Club and he became a member or an associate member of many of these Professional Societies at the Mall.

== Appointments ==
In 1999, Harris was commissioned to paint the Queen of Swaziland. Harris then received a picture request from Queen Elizabeth II for the Royal Collection at Buckingham Palace. Two of his works are also held at St James's Palace for The Prince of Wales. Former Prime Minister Tony Blair also has one of Harris' pictures.

Spending much of his life in England and Scotland both influenced his thinking and the nature of the artwork he completed. This led Harris to undertake the 'Round the World Painting Tour' for charity to Spain, Portugal, Thailand and Australia. Besides painting the portraits of many people, Harris also has an international reputation as a landscape painter. Harris practically always works entirely in front of the subject, outside in all weathers, anywhere in the world.

In Scotland, Harris was invited to work on the film set of the motion picture Rob Roy, and completed pastel studies, watercolour and portraits drawings of Michael Caton-Jones, Bill Westley, John Hurt, Liam Neeson, Andrew Keir, Tim Roth, Jessica Lange as well as Karen Matheson, a member of the Scottish folk group Capercaillie. Harris also had a brief appearance in the film.

A world tour beginning at the Scottish Exhibition and Conference Centre in Glasgow and included stops in Belfast, Dublin, New York, North Carolina, South Carolina, Russia, France, Johannesburg, Hong Kong, Florence and Earls Court in London.

== Major exhibitions ==
- 1990: The Edinburgh Gallery, Edinburgh (shared an exhibition with Jack Vettriano)
- Seven Nations Celtic Festival, Brittany France
- Scottish National Heritage Conference Centre, Battleby
- RSAMD, Glasgow
- Glamis Castle, Glamis Scotland
- 1997: The Queens Hall, Edinburgh
- 1997: Large public exhibition in Nizhny Novgorod, Russia opened by the Duke of Kent
- 2002: Royal request for a private exhibition in Rome for The Prince of Wales
- The Landmark in Hong Kong which came about as a result an invitation from Percy Weatherall
- 2008: Solo exhibition - One hundred paintings, Province of Aurum Pescara

== Restoration work ==
Harris received a commission from the Roman Catholic Church to support the restoration of a Scottish Monastery, with a series of other activities, including talks and Seminars to assist this charitable purpose. Harris has also worked as a restorer of the old masters. Artists he has restored were: A painting of Venice by Canaletto (private collection); a major early Renaissance painting believed to be a Giotto (private collection); a number of Scottish painters including a Farquharson landscape (private collection); several John Duncan Fergusson landscapes (private collections).

== Publications ==
Trust Your Eye: an Illustrated History of Painting. ISBN 978-0992698508.

== Major portrait commissions ==
Along with numerous other commissions, portrait requests continue to the present. They have included:

- Viscount Stormont – Scone Palace
- Viscountess Stormont – Scone Palace
- The Queen of Swaziland – Request received in South Africa
- Lord Steel – The House of Commons, London
- Mother Teresa – St. Teresa's Convent Effingham Sy.
- Mother Veronica – St Theresa's Convent Effingham Sy.
- John Rees, headmaster of Blundell's School
- Ossie Stewart, British olympic bronze medallist
- Peter Corey, actor (private collection)
- Trevor Byfield, actor (private collection)
- Eddie Durham, New Orleans Jazz musician
- Paul Fitzgerald, British and international speed skater
- Graham White, British and English stock car racing champion
- Tiki Barber, former running back with the New York Giants, USA
- Lord Carloway – High Court Judge Edinburgh
- The Royal Naval Aircraft Works Scotland 6 pictures
- Caithness Glass Scotland 4 pictures
- Heavy Horse Centre Scotland 2 pictures
