= Charlie Garcia Vitug =

Filipino film and television producer

- Other name: Charlie Vitug
- Occupations: producer; director; writer
- Years active: 2021-present (filmmaking)
- Relatives: Romy Vitug (uncle)

Charlie Garcia Vitug is a Filipino film and television producer, director, and screenwriter, most known for her films Immaculada (2027), Ballad of a Blind Man (2024), and Through the Viewfinder (2023).

In 2023, Vitug founded Charlie Vitug Productions, Inc. (CVP), an audiovisual production company in the Philippines, where she continues to produce films.

She was formerly a Producer at Gushcloud International, a Singapore-based talent management and entertainment company, from 2025 to 2026 before returning to CVP. From 2023 to 2025, she was a Writer at SINEGANG.ph, a Philippines-based entertainment publication.

Vitug is the niece of late Filipino cinematographer Romy Vitug.

== Early life and education ==
At age 10, Vitug was diagnosed with bilateral optic neuropathy, the permanent damage on the optic nerves of both eyes. She has publicly spoken about her medical condition on media publications such as Rappler, Daily Tribune, and Manila Standard among others, discussing how it inspires her advocacy of using filmmaking as a platform to gain more accurate representation for persons with disabilities (PWDs) in the media.

Vitug earned her Bachelor of Arts degree in film with specialization in writing from De La Salle–College of Saint Benilde, graduating Magna cum Laude. A public announcement from the team of Ricky Lee, Philippine national artist, showcased the list of selected participants for the return of the Ricky Lee Screenwriting Workshop, which listed Vitug as part of Batch 30.

== Filmography ==
Romuelda (2022)

Vitug won the award for Best Screenplay for her debut film Romuelda (2022) at the 2022 Hong Kong Super Short Film Festival.

Love Again (2023)

In 2023, Vitug produced, directed, and wrote Love Again, a hybrid of a film and music video for the song 'Love Again' by Filipino independent artist Komii, which had screenings in New York, Sydney, Melbourne, Bengal, Manila, and Cebu. The film also won multiple awards in festivals including Best Romantic Short, Best Original Soundtrack (for Komii), and Best Debut Filmmaker (for Vitug) at the 2023 Black Swan International Film Festival, and Best Music Video and Best Song in a Film at the 2023 Top Shorts Film Festival.

Through the Viewfinder (2023)

Through the Viewfinder (2023), with Vitug credited as producer and director, premiered at the Manila Hotel in the Philippines as a Finalist of the 2023 Gawad Sining Film Festival. A monochromatic director's cut of the film was eventually released in 2025, receiving a nomination from the Filipino Academy of Movie Arts and Sciencesfor Best Advocacy Film at the 1st FAMAS Short Film Festival 2025.

Ballad of a Blind Man (2024)

Ballad of a Blind Man (2024), with Vitug credited as director and writer, premiered in June 2024 during the re-opening of the Manila Metropolitan Theater. Filipino actor Joel Saracho starred in the film, portraying the role of 'Claudio (The Dad),' described as an overbearing father who is gradually losing his sight. The film was one of 8 recipients of a production grant of one hundred thousand Philippine pesos from the local government unit of Manila, becoming a finalist of The Manila Film Festival 2024, where it was also nominated for Best Cinematography for Paolo Ariola. Later that year, Vitug's directorial work in the film earned her an Honorable Mention for Best Director at the 2024 Los Angeles Film and Documentary Awards in Los Angeles, California. In 2025, the film was named Best Asian Film at the 2025 Cannes Film Awards in France.

Immaculada (2027)

In 2026, CVP announced the production of Immaculada as a Filipino gothic horror short film through a press release via SINEGANG.ph. Vitug, as producer, director, and writer of the film, received the CreatePH Films Short Film Grant from the Film Development Council of the Philippines to support the project.
