= Charles Oscar Harris =

American politician from Alabama

Charles Oscar Harris (August 5, 1852 – October 8, 1913) was an American public official and state legislator in Alabama.

He was born August 5, 1852, in Tuskegee, Alabama (or Georgia) and studied at Oberlin College in Ohio and Howard University in Washington D.C. He returned to Alabama and served in the Alabama House of Representatives in 1876 and 1877. He served as a Republican, and attended the Republican National Conventions as a delegate eights times.

In March 1875 Harris along with other prominent African Americans form Montgomery purchased tickets to white-only seats in the local theatre in an attempt to test the 1875 Civil Rights Act. Being duly denied the seats they took the issue to the courts.

After his service to the legislature he had a long career as a mailing clerk serving under the terms of seven presidents and four postmasters.

He died October 8, 1913, and had still been working as a clerk in the Montgomery postoffice.

A historical marker is at his home site at 813 Adams Avenue in Montgomery, it was dedicated April 27, 2019. His descendants with the surname Hilyer passed as white.

== See also ==
- African American officeholders from the end of the Civil War until before 1900
