= Charny, Côte-d'Or =

Charny
- Commune
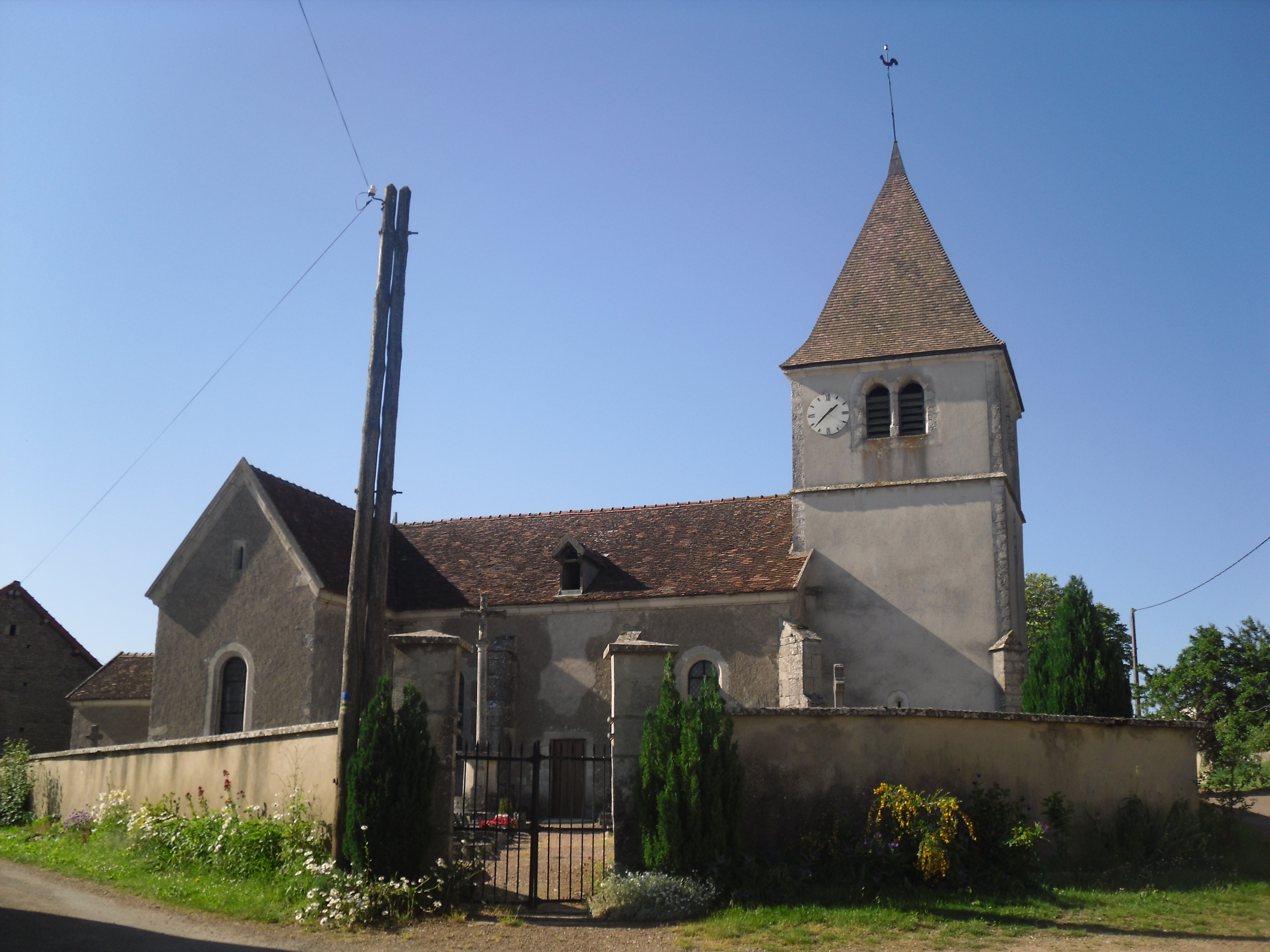
- The church in Charny

- Coat of arms
- Location of Charny
- Location within France Location within Bourgogne-Franche-Comté
- Coordinates: 47°20′15″N 4°25′46″E
- Country: France
- Region: Bourgogne-Franche-Comté
- Department: Côte-d'Or
- Arrondissement: Montbard
- Canton: Semur-en-Auxois

Government
  - Mayor (2025–2026): Franck Joseph
- Area^{1}: 7.8 km^{2} (3.0 sq mi)
- Elevation: 518 m (1,699 ft)
- Highest elevation: 567 m (1,860 ft)
- Lowest elevation: 342 m (1,122 ft)
- Population (2023): 33
  - Density: 4.2/km^{2} (11/sq mi)
- Time zone: UTC+01:00 (CET)
  - Summer (DST): UTC+02:00 (CEST)
- INSEE/Postal code: 21147 /21350
- ^{1} French Land Register data, which excludes lakes, ponds, glaciers > 1 km^{2} (0.386 sq mi or 247 acres) and river estuaries.

Charny (French pronunciation: [ʃaʁni]) is a commune in the Côte-d'Or department in eastern France.

== History ==
On 16 September 1911, Edouard Nieuport, racing pilot and airplane designer, dies a day after an airplane accident while landing at the Military Aerodrome in Charny in bad weather.

== Population ==
Historical population
Year	Pop.	±% p.a.
1968	51	—
1975	45	−1.77%
1982	42	−0.98%
1990	38	−1.24%
1999	34	−1.23%
2007	33	−0.37%
2012	32	−0.61%
2017	34	+1.22%
2023	33	−0.50%
Source: INSEE

== See also ==
- Communes of the Côte-d'Or department
