= Ferguson brothers killings =

1946 killings on Long Island, New York

- Date: February 5, 1946
- Location: Freeport, New York
- Deaths: 2
- Injuries: 1

On February 5, 1946, Charles and Alphonso Ferguson, two African-American men in their 20s, were killed by Joseph Romeika, a 26-year-old white police officer.
