= Charlene (given name) =

- Pronunciation: /tʃɑːrˈliːn, ʃɑːrˈliːn/ char-LEEN, shar-LEEN
- Gender: Female

Origin
- Origin: French, from Germanic
- Meaning: Free Woman, Free Spirit, Free Thinker

Other names
- Variant forms: Charley, Charlie, Charline, Charlyne, Carla, Charleen, Sharlene, Sharleen
- Related names: Charlotte, Carla, Carol, Carole, Caroline

Charlene, also spelled Charleen, Charline, and Charlyne, is a female given name, a feminine form of Charles coined in the United States in the nineteenth century; from French Charles, from Old French Charles & Carles, from the Latin Carolus, Karolus from and also reinfluenced by Old High German Karl, from the Proto-Germanic *karlaz (lit. "Free Man"/"Free Spirit"/Free Thinker); compare the Old English word churl and the Old German Kerl.

== People ==
- Charlene, Princess of Monaco (née Wittstock, born 1978), South African swimmer and wife of Albert II, Prince of Monaco
- Charlene Almarvez (born 1993), Filipina fashion model from Laguna
- Charlene Attard (born 1987), track and field sprint athlete
- Charleen Badman, American chef and restaurateur
- Charlene Barshefsky (born 1950), United States Trade Representative from 1997 to 2001
- Charlyne Brumskine, Liberian politician
- Charlene Carr, Canadian writer
- Charlene Carruthers, American activist and author
- Charlene Choi (born 1982), Chinese actress and singer
- Charlie Collins, Australian musician, born Charlene Joyce Bailey
- Charlene Corley, former defense contractor who was convicted in 2007 on two counts of conspiracy
- Charlene Cothran, publisher of Venus and Kitchen Table News magazines
- Charleen Cha Cruz-Behag (born 1988), Filipino volleyball player
- Charlene D'Angelo (born 1950), American R&B singer best known as simply "Charlene"
- Charlene Dallas, Miss California for 1966
- Charlene Dash, African-American model
- Charlene de Carvalho-Heineken (born 1954), owner of a controlling interest in the world's third-largest brewer, Heineken International
- Charlene Downes (born 1989), British missing person
- Charlene Drew Jarvis (born 1941), American educator and former scientific researcher and politician
- Charlene Dukes, American academic administrator
- Charlene Fernetz (born 1960), Canadian actress
- Charlene Gonzales (born 1976), television and film personality and former beauty queen from the Philippines
- Charlène Guignard (born 1989), French-Italian ice dancer, representing Italy
- Charlene Honeywell (born 1957), United States District Judge on the United States District Court for the Middle District of Florida
- Charlene James, British playwright and screenwriter
- Charlene Johnson, Canadian politician
- Charlene Lima (born 1953), American politician
- Charlene Marshall (born 1933), Democratic member of the West Virginia House of Delegates
- Charlene McKenna (born 1985), award-winning Irish actress
- Charlene Mitchell (1930–2022), African American international socialist, feminist, labor and civil rights activist
- Charlene Morett (born 1957), former field hockey player from the United States
- Charlene P. Kammerer (born 1948), Bishop in the United Methodist Church
- Charlene Pesquiera, Democratic politician from the U.S. state of Arizona
- Charlene Pryer (1921–1999), female utility in the All-American Girls Professional Baseball League
- Charlene Rendina (born 1947), retired Australian runner
- Charlene Rink (born 1972), former professional fitness competitor and competitive female bodybuilder
- Charlene Leonora Smith, South-African journalist
- Charlene Soraia (born 1988), English singer
- Charlene Spretnak (born 1946), author, academic and feminist
- Charlene Strong (born 1963), American gay rights activist
- Charlene Takesian, American politician
- Charlene Teters (born 1952), American artist, educator, and lecturer
- Charlene Thomas (born 1982), English middle-distance runner
- Charlene Thomas-Swinson, American basketball coach
- Charlene Tilton (born 1958), American actress best known for playing Lucy Ewing Cooper on Dallas
- Charlene White (born 1980), British journalist and newsreader
- Charlene Wong (born 1966), Canadian figure skater
- Charlyne Yi (born 1986), American actress
- Charlene Zettel, member of the California State Assembly from 1999 until 2003

== Fictional characters ==
- Charlene "Chugs" Bradley, a character from 2009 slasher film Sorority Row.
- Charlene Doofenshmirtz, the wife of Dr. Doofenshmirtz in the Disney television series Phineas and Ferb
- Charlene Matlock, in the television show Matlock, played by Linda Purl
- Charlene Robinson, in the Australian soap opera Neighbours, played by Kylie Minogue
- Charlene Frazier Stillfield, in the television series Designing Women, played by Jean Smart
- Charlene "Charley" Davidson, one of the main supporting characters in the Biker Mice from Mars franchise
- Charlene Sinclair, in the television series Dinosaurs
- Charlene Turner, a female main character from the novel book series Kingdom Keepers.
- Charlene, a supporting character in the animated television series Victor and Valentino
- Charlene, the rifle used by Private Gomer Pyle in Full Metal Jacket
- Charlene Calhoun, a character from One Battle After Another
- Charlene, the Tagalog dub name for Botan (see list of YuYu Hakusho characters), in the anime series YuYu Hakusho (known in the Philippines as Ghost Fighter)

== See also ==
- Charlin (name)
- Charline (name)
- Charleene Closshey
- Cha Cruz, born Charleen Abigaile Ramos Cruz
