= Charlie Ferguson (1900s pitcher) =

American baseball player and umpire (1875-1931)

- Pitcher / Umpire
- Born: May 10, 1875; Meridian, Michigan, U.S.
- Died: May 17, 1931 (aged 56); Sault Ste. Marie, Michigan, U.S.
- Batted: Unknown Threw: Right

MLB debut
- September 20, 1901, for the Chicago Orphans

Last MLB appearance
- September 20, 1901, for the Chicago Orphans

MLB statistics
- Win–loss record: 0–0
- Earned run average: 0.00
- Strikeouts: 0
- Stats at Baseball Reference

Teams
- Chicago Orphans (1901)

Charles Augustus Ferguson (May 10, 1875 – May 17, 1931) was an American relief pitcher and umpire in Major League Baseball in the early 20th century.

== Biography ==
Ferguson's grave (leftmost) at Mount Hope Cemetery

Ferguson played in one game for the Chicago Orphans of the National League in 1901. He pitched two innings, giving up one hit and two walks; he did not allow a run.

In 1913, Ferguson umpired 121 games in the American League, followed by a single game in 1914. In the 122 games he umpired, he made six ejections.

Ferguson died in May 1931, having drowned in Lake Superior's Whitefish Bay with two other men during a fishing trip. He was buried at Mount Hope Cemetery in Lansing.

== See also ==
- List of Major League Baseball umpires (disambiguation)
