= Charles Fergusson Forbes =

English army surgeon

Sir Charles Fergusson Forbes, KH (1779 – 22 March 1852) was an English army surgeon.

== Life ==
Forbes was educated to the medical profession in London. He joined the army medical staff in Portugal in 1798, was gazetted next year assistant-surgeon to the Royals, served in Holland, at Ferrol, in Egypt, the Mediterranean, the West Indies, and through the Peninsular War, having been appointed to the staff in 1808 and made deputy inspector-general of hospitals in 1813. He retired in 1814 with that rank and the war medal with five clasps, and commenced practice as a physician in Argyll Street, London. He graduated from the University of Edinburgh in 1808 with a Doctor of Medicine, and joined the College of Physicians of London in 1814, becoming a fellow in 1841.

In 1816 he was appointed physician to the newly founded Royal Westminster Infirmary for Diseases of the Eye in Warwick Street, Golden Square, having George James Guthrie as his surgical colleague. In 1827 a difference of opinion arose between Forbes and Guthrie as to the treatment of inflammatory affections of the eye; the subject was noticed in The Lancet adversely to Guthrie, who began an action for libel against the journal, but abandoned it on learning that Forbes had been subpoenaed as a witness. Having been insulted at the hospital by one Hale Thomson, a young surgeon in Guthrie's party, Forbes challenged Thomson to a duel. It was fought with pistols on Clapham Common at half-past three in the afternoon of 29 December 1827; when each had fired twice without effect, the seconds interposed, but another encounter was demanded by the principals, which was also harmless. The seconds then declared the duel at an end, against the wishes of the parties.

Forbes resigned his appointment at the hospital, carrying a number of its subscribers with him. He declined an offer by Guthrie to give him the satisfaction of a gentleman and an officer of the same service, on the ground that the offer was not made until after events at the hospital had been allowed to take their course. He had a considerable practice among a number of families of the nobility. He was a Knight of the Crescent, in 1837 was made a Guelphic knight of Hanover, and in 1844 an English knight. He died at Argyll Street on 22 March 1852.

== Works ==
He wrote:

- Two pamphlets related the Guthrie affair (1828);
- A brief record of a case of fatal thrombosis of the thigh veins in the Medico-Chirurgical Transactions, xiii. (1827);
- "The Table-Talk of an Old Campaigner" in The United Service Magazine, (September 1834).
