= Charbin, Iran =

Charbin چربين
- Village
- Location within Iran
- Coordinates: 36°32′21″N 49°20′56″E
- Country: Iran
- Province: Qazvin
- County: Qazvin
- Bakhsh: Tarom Sofla
- Rural District: Niyarak

Population (2006)
  - Total: 49
- Time zone: UTC+3:30 (IRST)
  - Summer (DST): UTC+4:30 (IRDT)

Charbin (Persian: چربين, also Romanized as Charbīn; also known as Chūbīn) is a village in Niyarak Rural District, Tarom Sofla District, Qazvin County, Qazvin Province, Iran. At the 2006 census, its population was 49, in 12 families.
