= Chara =

Chara may refer to:

== Places ==
- Chara Airport, an airport in Russia near the rural locality
- Chara (river), a river in Russia
- Chara (rural locality), a rural locality (a selo) in Zabaykalsky Krai, Russia
- Chara Sands, a sanded area in Siberia, Russia

== Science ==
- Chara (alga), a genus of algae in the family Characeae
- CHARA array, a telescope
- Chara (moth), a genus of moths in the family Noctuidae
- Beta Canum Venaticorum, proper name Chara, a star in the constellation Canes Venatici
- Cor Caroli and Beta Canum Venaticorum make up the Southern dogs in the constellation Canes Venatici, called Chara

== People ==
- Chara (given name)
- Chara people, ethnic group in the Southern Nations, Nationalities, and Peoples' Region of Ethiopia
- Chara (singer), Japanese singer
- Chara (surname)

== Other uses ==
- Chara language, the language of the Chara people
- Chara (magazine), a Japanese yaoi and shōjo manga magazine published by Tokuma Shoten
- Chara (Undertale), a video game character
- USS Chara (AKA-58), a 1944 Achernar class attack cargo ship

== See also ==
- Charabanc, a type of vehicle common in Britain during the early part of the 20th century
- Charas (disambiguation)
- Ceará (disambiguation)
- Chaka (disambiguation)
- Chakra (disambiguation)
- Chala (disambiguation)
- Char (disambiguation)
- Chard (disambiguation)
- Charm (disambiguation)
- Chart (disambiguation)
