= Chara (given name) =

Chara or Chará is a feminine (or neutral) given name and a surname. Chara mostly is used as the greek "Χαρά" with English lettering but Chara can also be an English name. Chara is an English feminine given name that is a diminutive form of Charlotte as well as an alternate form of Cara and Kara from the Latin cārus meaning “darling, beloved, dear, loved one”. Chara is also a Spanish feminine given name as an alternate form for Sarah. Chará (Greek: Χαρά) is a Greek feminine given name from the Ancient Greek word khará which means joy, gladness. It is a short form of the feminine name Charalampía which is a combination of the Ancient Greek roots khará (joy, gladness) and lámpō (shine). It is also a short form of the feminine name Chariclea who was one of the Forty Holy Virgin Martyrs who were tortured because they would not offer sacrifice to idols and kept their Christian Faith. Chariclea is a combination of the Ancient Greek roots charis (grace) and kleos (glory). Notable people who are known by this name include the following:

== Mononym ==
- Chara (singer), stagename of Miwa Watabiki (born 1968), Japanese singer, actress and video jockey
- Chara (footballer), nickname of Fernando Agostinho da Costa (born 1981), Angolan football player

== Given name ==
- Chara Bachir, Algerian politician
- Chara Charalambous (born 2000), Cypriot footballer
- Chara M. Curtis, American writer
- Chara Dimitriou (born 1990), Greek football player
- Chara Papadopoulou (born 1996), Greek volleyball player

== Fictional characters ==
- Chara, a character in the 2015 video game Undertale, by Toby Fox
- Chara, a character in the Professor Layton TV series

== See also ==
- Chara (disambiguation)
- Chara (surname)
- Cara (given name)
- Chapa (given name)
- Chapa (surname)
- Char (name)
- Chard (name)
- Chari (surname)
- Charl (name)
- Charla (name)
- Charo (name)
- Chiara (name)
- Ciara (given name)
- Clara (given name)
- Chmara
