= Char (name) =

Char is a French feminine given name that is a variation of Chardonnay, Charlene, and Charlotte and a feminine form of Charles. Char is also used as a variation of Charmaine.

Notable people with this name include:

== Mononym ==
- Char (musician), professional name of Hisato Takenaka (born 1955), Japanese musician, singer-songwriter and record producer

== Given name ==
- Char Fontane (1952–2007), American actress
- Char Davies (born 1954), Canadian artist
- Char Margolis (born 1951), American spiritualist
- Char Pouaka (born 1973), New Zealand softball player
- Char-ron Dorsey (born 1977), American gridiron football

== Surname ==
- Adela Chaljub de Char (1943–1994), First Lady of the Atlántico from 1984 to 1987
- Fuad Char (born 1937), Colombian politician
- René Char (1907–1988), French poet
- Sofia Daccarett Char (born 1993), better known as Sofia Carson, American actress and singer

== Middle name ==
- Alejandro Char Chaljub (born 1966), Colombian politician
- Arturo Char Chaljub (born 1967), Colombian politician
- David Char Navas, Colombian politician

== Fictional characters ==
- Bron-Char, Marvel Comics character
- Char Aznable, from the Gundam franchise

== See also ==
- Char (disambiguation)
- Cha (Korean surname)
- Chad (name)
- Chai (surname)
- Chal (name)
- Chan (surname)
- Chao (surname)
- Chara (given name)
- Chara (surname)
- Chard (name)
- Chari (surname)
- Charl (name)
- Charo (name)
- Chas (given name)
- Chay (given name)
- Chaz
