= Charo (name) =

Charo is a feminine given name, feminine nickname or surname. It is a diminutive of Hail Mary (a shortened form of María (del) Rosario). It means 'rosary' in Spanish and is thus a pet name for Rosario. It is also sometimes a diminutive of Charlotte. It may also refer to the following:

== Given name ==
- Charo Sádaba Chalezquer (born 1972), Spanish advertising professor
- Charo Ronquillo (born 1990), Filipino fashion model

== Nickname ==
- Charo Santos-Concio, nickname of María Rosario Santos y Navarro de Concio (born 1955), Filipina media executive and actress
- Charo López, stage name of María del Rosario López Piñuelas (born 1943), Spanish actress
- Charo Soriano, nickname of Maria Rosario Soriano (born 1985), Filipino volleyball player and coach
- Charo, stage name of María Rosario Pilar Martínez Molina Baeza, a Spanish-American entertainment personality
- Charo Urbano, stage name of María del Rosario Urbano Sánchez, a Spanish actress, theatre director, and author.

== Surname ==
- Robin Alta Charo (born 1958), American bioethics professor

== See also ==
- Caro (given name)
- Caro (surname)
- Char (name)
- Chara (given name)
- Chara (surname)
- Chard (name)
- Chari (surname)
- Charl (name)
- Charo (disambiguation)
- Charon
- Charos Kayumova
- Claro (surname)
