= Charla (name) =

Charla is an English feminine given name that is a feminine form of Charles. Notable people with the name include:

== Given name ==
- Charla Baklayan Faddoul (born 1976), Armenian-American television actress
- Charla Doherty (1946–1988), American film actress
- Charla King, murder victim
- Charla Krupp (1953–2012), American writer
- Charla Nash, assault victim of Travis (chimpanzee)
- Charla Pihlstrom, winner of season 1 of Paradise Hotel
- Charla Sedacca (born 1960), American female bodybuilder
- Charla Wise, American aerospace engineer

== Fictional characters ==
- Charla Swann, main character of Island (novel series)

== See also ==
- Carla
- Chakla (disambiguation)
- Chala (disambiguation)
- Challa (disambiguation)
- Chara (given name)
- Chara (surname)
- Charka (disambiguation)
- Charl (name)
- Charle (name)
- Charli (disambiguation)
- Charlo (name)
- Charls
- Charly (name)
- Charra (disambiguation)
- Kharla Chávez
- Sharla
