= Chail =

Chail may refer to:

== People ==
- Jaswant Singh Chail
- Probir Chail (born 1956), Indian cricketer
- Prolay Chail (born 1951), Indian cricketer

== Places ==
- Chail, Deux-Sèvres, France
- Chail, Himachal Pradesh, India
- Chail, Uttar Pradesh, India
  - Chail Assembly constituency
  - Chail Lok Sabha constituency

== Other uses ==
- Chail (meteorite), an 1814 meteorite fall
- Chail, a dialect area of the Torwali language in Pakistan

== See also ==
- Challa (disambiguation)
- Chala (disambiguation)
- Chalia (disambiguation)
- Chhaila, a 1995 Indian film
- Chhalia (1973 film), 1973 Indian film
