= Ge Wang (scientist) =

Medical imaging scientist

- 王革
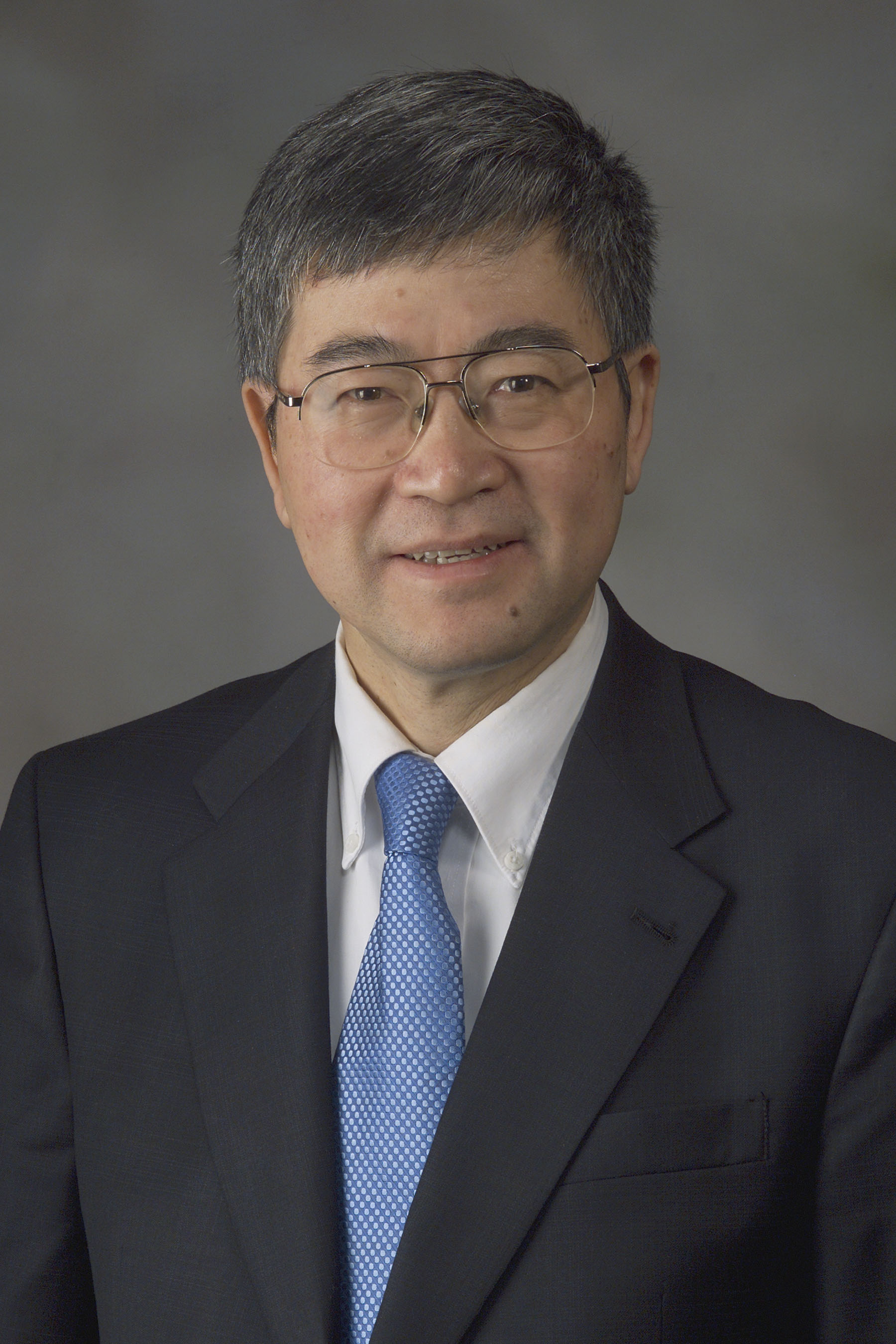
- Education: Xidian University (B.E.); University of the Chinese Academy of Sciences (M.S.); University at Buffalo (M.S., PhD)
- Known for: Contributions to cone-beam computed tomography and deep learning–based medical imaging
- Scientific career
- Fields: Biomedical engineering, medical imaging, computed tomography, artificial intelligence
- Workplaces: Rensselaer Polytechnic Institute
- Website: faculty.rpi.edu/ge-wang

Ge Wang (Chinese: 王 革) is a medical imaging scientist focusing on computed tomography (CT) and artificial intelligence (AI) especially deep learning. He is the Clark & Crossan Chair Professor of Biomedical Engineering and the Director of the Biomedical Imaging Center at Rensselaer Polytechnic Institute, Troy, New York, USA. He is known for his research and teaching on CT and AI-based imaging. He is a Fellow of the American Institute for Medical and Biological Engineering (AIMBE), Institute of Electrical and Electronics Engineers (IEEE), International Society for Optics and Photonics (SPIE), Optical Society of America (OSA/Optica), American Association of Physicists in Medicine (AAPM), American Association for the Advancement of Science (AAAS), and National Academy of Inventors (NAI). Since January 1, 2025, he has been serving as the Editor-in-Chief of the IEEE Transactions on Medical Imaging.

== Education ==
Wang earned a B.E. in Signal Processing at Xidian University and an M.S. in Remote Sensing at University of the Chinese Academy of Sciences. He was awarded an M.S. and a Ph.D. in Electrical and Computer Engineering from the University at Buffalo.

== Research work ==
Wang, a pioneer in the field of medical imaging, made contributions that initiated the development of the spiral cone-beam computed tomography (CT) during the early 1990s. His work addressed the “long object problem,” which involves longitudinal data truncation in cone-beam CT scans.

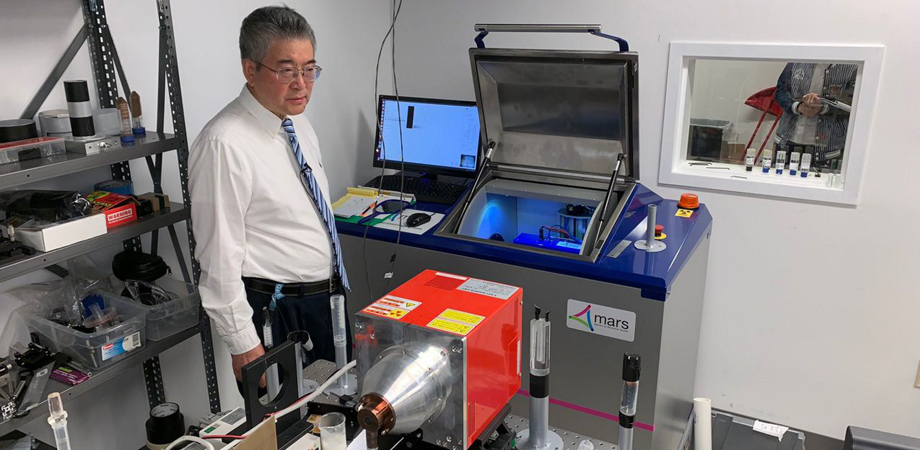
Wang in his X-ray imaging Lab

To solve the long-object problem, Wang and his collaborators enhanced existing 2D filtered backprojection and Feldkamp–Davis–Kress reconstruction by introducing 3D backprojection along the actual measurement rays from a spiral cone-beam scanning trajectory. This approach, marked the earliest advancement in cone-beam spiral CT. Commercial CT systems adopted and improved the approach proposed by Wang and colleagues.

In recognition of his contributions, Wang was inducted into the National Academy of Inventors in 2019. His research output includes numerous papers on cone-beam CT, covering topics such as exact cone-beam reconstruction with a general trajectory and quasi-exact triple-source spiral cone-beam reconstruction. Notably, about 200 million medical CT scans are performed annually using the cone-beam spiral scanning mode.

After his cone-beam CT work, Wang ventured into deep tomographic imaging. In 2016, he presented the first roadmap for deep imaging, which led to a series of influential papers on deep imaging-based low-dose CT, few-view, reconstruction, artifact reduction, radiomics, foundation models, and healthcare metaverse. His team also authored the first book on machine learning-based tomographic reconstruction. Collaborating with institutions like General Electric, the Food and Drug Administration, Johns Hopkins University, Yale University, and Harvard University, Wang’s group develops cutting-edge imaging algorithms for clinical and preclinical applications.

Wang’s team and collaborators developed interior tomography theory and algorithms, addressing the long-standing “interior problem”. His team also explored omni-tomography for spatiotemporal fusion of tomographic modalities, including the concept of simultaneous CT-MRI. Additionally, Wang and collaborators pioneered bioluminescence tomography for optical molecular imaging and developed spectrography techniques for ultrafast and ultrafine tomography using polychromatic scattering data.

His scholarly output includes over 800 peer-reviewed papers in journals such as Nature, Nature Machine Intelligence, Nature Communications, and Proceedings of the National Academy of Sciences. Wang holds more than 170 issued and published patents. His research has been consistently funded by the National Institutes of Health, the National Science Foundation and General Electric, with total grants exceeding $40 million.

== Honors ==
=== Fellowship ===
- Fellow of the American Institute for Medical and Biological Engineering (AIMBE) “for seminal contributions to the development of single-slice spiral, cone-beam spiral, and micro-CT”, 2002
- Fellow of the Institute of Electrical and Electronics Engineers (IEEE) "for contributions to x-ray tomography", 2003
- Fellow of the International Society for Optical Engineering (SPIE) “for specific achievements in bioluminescence tomography and x-ray computed tomography”, 2007
- Optica Fellow “for pioneering contributions to development of bioluminescence tomography”, 2010
- Fellow of the American Association of Physicists in Medicine (AAPM) “for contributions to medical physics”, 2012
- Fellow of the American Association for the Advancement of Science (AAAS) “for distinguished contributions to the field of biomedical imaging, particularly for x-ray computed tomography, optical molecular tomography, interior tomography, and multi-modality fusion”, 2014.
- Fellow of the National Academy of Inventors (NAI) “for contributions to spiral/helical cone-beam/multi-slice CT”, 2019.

=== Awards ===
- Giovanni DiChiro Award for Outstanding Scientific Research, Journal of Computer Assisted Tomography, 1997
- AAPM/IPEM Medical Physics Travel Award in the US to lecture in Europe for 2–3 weeks), American Association of Physicists in Medicine and Institute of Physics and Engineering in Medicine, 1999
- Herbert M. Stauffer Award for Outstanding Basic Science Paper in Academic Radiology, Association of University Radiologists, USA, 2005
- Dean's Award for Excellence in Research, College of Engineering, Virginia Tech, 2010
- Barry M. Goldwater Scholarship (Eugene Katsevich as an undergraduate with Princeton University for a paper from his summer intern work in Ge Wang's lab at Virginia Tech), 2012
- School of Engineering Outstanding Professor Award, Rensselaer Polytechnic Institute, 2018
- IEEE EMBS Academic Career Achievement Award “for pioneering contributions on cone-beam tomography and deep learning-based tomographic imaging”, IEEE Engineering in Medicine and Biology Society, 2021
- IEEE Region 1 Outstanding Teaching Award “for development of the first graduate and undergraduate deep learning-based medical imaging courses at Rensselaer Polytechnic Institute”, IEEE, 2021
- World Artificial Intelligence Conference Youth Outstanding Paper Award “for Shan HM, Padole A, Homayounieh F, Kruger U, Khera RD, Nitiwarangkul C, Kalra MK, Wang G, Nature Machine Intelligence 1:269-276, 2019”, World Artificial Intelligence Conference, 2021
- SPIE Aden & Marjorie Meinel Technology Achievement Award “for contributions in X-ray and optical molecular tomography, including their coupling for biomedical applications”, SPIE, 2022
- Walston Chubb Award for Innovation, Sigma Xi, 2022
- Edward J Hoffman Medical Imaging Scientist Award, 2023.
- IEEE TRPMS Best Paper Award, 2024
- Edith H. Quimby Award for Lifetime Achievement in Medical Physics from the American Association of Physicists in Medicine, 2025
- Ranked 42nd worldwide in the field of nuclear medicine and medical imaging in the 2025 citation database compiled by John P. A. Ioannidis and colleagues at Stanford University.
- Highly Cited Researcher (Clarivate), 2025.
