= Charl (name) =

Charl is an Afrikaans, English, and German masculine given name. Notable people with this name include the following:

== Given name ==
- Charl Cilliers (writer) (born 1941), South African author and poet
- Charl Crous (born 1990), South African swimmer
- Charl Cyster (born 1994), South African cricketer
- Charl du Plessis (rugby union) (born 1987), South African rugby player
- Charl du Plessis (pianist) (born 1977), South African pianist
- Charl du Toit (born 1993), South African Paralympic sprint athlete
- Charl Langeveldt (born 1974), South African cricket coach and cricketer
- Charl Malan (born 1989), English cricketer
- Charl Mattheus (born 1965), South African ultramarathon athlete
- Charl McLeod (born 1983), South African rugby player
- Charl Pietersen (born 1983), South African cricketer
- Charl Schwartzel (born 1984), South African golfer
- Charl van den Berg (1981–2015), South African model and activist
- Charl Willoughby (born 1974), South African cricketer

== Middle name ==
- Johan Charl Walters (1919–1993), South African Navy admiral

== See also ==
- Carl (name)
- Chal (name)
- Char (name)
- Chara (given name)
- Chara (surname)
- Chard (name)
- Chari (surname)
- Charla (name)
- Charle (name)
- Charls
- Charli (name)
- Charlo (name)
- Charly (name)
- Charo (name)
- Charyl
- Charm (disambiguation)
- Charr (disambiguation)
- Chart (disambiguation)
