= Challa =

Challa or Chala or Challah may refer to:

- Chala, a region in Peru
- Challa (moth), a genus of moth in the family Erebidae
- Challa (surname)
- Ger Challa, a Dutch chemist
- "Challa", a song by A. R. Rahman and Rabbi Shergill from the 2012 Indian film Jab Tak Hai Jaan

== In Judaism ==
- Chala (Jews), referring to Bukharan Jews who were allegedly forcibly converted to Islam
- Challah, a type of bread in Jewish cuisine
- Challah, a commandment in Judaism of dough offering
- Challah (tractate), a section of the Talmud dealing with dough offering

== See also ==
- Chala (disambiguation)
- Chail (disambiguation)
- Charla (name)
