= Khmara =

Khmara may refer to:

- Khmara (surname)
- Khmara Island
- Khmara Bay
