= Charra =

Charra may refer to:

- Charra, South Australia, a locality west of Ceduna
- Charra Airfield, an abandoned airfield in West Bengal, India
- Chharra Rafatpur, Uttar Pradesh, India is sometimes spelled Charra
- Charra, a traditional Mexican horsewoman, the female counterpart of Charro

== See also ==
- Chara
- Charla (name)
