= Cha (Korean surname) =

Korean family name

- Language: Korean

Origin
- Meaning: Chariot
- Region of origin: Korean Peninsula

Other names
- Variant form: Che (Chinese)

Korean name
- Hangul: 차
- Hanja: 車
- RR: Cha
- MR: Ch'a

Cha (Korean: 차) is a Korean family name.

== Clan ==
The Cha (車) clan, which takes Yeonan (延安) as its main branch, is descended from an ancient Chinese emperor (姓 was 姬, 諱 was 軒轅). The origin of the Cha clan in Korea dates back to when Emperor's descendant Sa-sin-gap (似辛甲) fled to ancient Joseon from China, settling down in Pyongyang under Iltosan (一土山), and changing his name to Wang-jo-myeong (王祖明). His descendant Wang Mong (王蒙) changed his name to Jeon (田), Shin (申), etc., to escape political persecution, and later changed his name to Cha Mu-il (車無一), thus establishing the origin of the Cha family.

"In the early Silla period, Cha Mu-Il, who served as Prime Minister (승상), had eight sons. The seventh son, Cha Shin-Eul (본명: JU-RIM, 別名: 車神乙), inherited the Cha family lineage. In later generations, the family produced 25 Prime Ministers, establishing the foundation of a prestigious aristocratic clan."

== Notable people with the surname ==
- Cha Bum-kun (born 1953), South Korean football manager
- Cha Bumseok (1924–2006), South Korean playwright and director
- Cha Chol-ma (born 1956), North Korean businessman
- Cha Chung-hwa (born 1980), South Korean actress
- Cha Dong-min (born 1986), South Korean retired taekwondo practitioner
- Cha Du-ri (born 1980), German-born South Korean professional football manager and former player
- Cha Gi-suk (1986–2021), South Korean professional footballer
- Cha Hak-yeon (stage name N, born 1990), South Korean singer, member of boy band VIXX
- Cha Han-sik (born 1965), South Korean runner
- Cha Hong (born 1981), South Korean hairdresser
- Hugh Cha (born 1985), Korean American actor, singer, dancer
- Cha Hui-rim (born 1953), North Korean politician
- Cha Hun (born 1994), South Korean singer and actor, member of band N.Flying
- Cha Hwa-yeon (born 1960), South Korean actress
- Cha Hyo-sim (born 1994), North Korean table tennis player
- Cha Hyon-hyang (born 1979), South Korean judoka
- Cha Hyun-ok (stage name Yuri, born 1976), South Korean singer
- Cha Hyung-won (1890–1972), South Korean living national treasure
- Cha In-ha (1992–2019), South Korean actor
- Cha In-pyo (born 1967), South Korean actor and director
- Cha Jae-goan (born 1972), South Korean wheelchair curler
- Cha Jae-kyung (born 1971), South Korean team handball player, Olympic gold medalist
- Cha Ji-ho (born 1983), South Korean retired footballer
- Cha Ji-yeon (born 1982), South Korean actress and singer
- Jimmy Cha (born 1951), South Korean professional Go and avid poker player
- Cha Jin-ho, South Korean wheelchair curler
- Cha Jong-hyok (born 1985), North Korean former professional footballer
- Cha Joo-young (born 1990), South Korean actress
- Cha Jun-hwan (born 2001), South Korean figure skater
- Cha Jung-won (born 1989), South Korean actress and model
- Car, the Garden (born Cha Jung-won, 1990), South Korean singer
- Cha Kum-chol (born 1987), North Korean weightlifter
- Cha Kwang-su (born 1979), North Korean wrestler
- Cha Kwi-hyun (born 1975), South Korean footballer
- Cha Kyung-bok (1937–2006), South Korean football manager
- Cha Meeyoung (born 1979), South Korean data scientist and professor
- Cha Min-kyu (born 1993), South Korean speed skater, Olympic silver medalist
- Cha Myong-jin (born 1959), South Korean activist and politician
- Cha Oh-yeon (born 1998), South Korean footballer
- Cha Seung-won (born 1970), South Korean actor
- Cha Seung-woo (born 1978), South Korean singer and actor
- Cha Soo-yeon (born 1981), South Korean actress
- Cha Soo-yong (born 1980), South Korean para table tennis player, Paralympic silver medalist
- Baro (entertainer) (born Cha Sun-woo, 1992), South Korean entertainer, member of boy band B1A4
- Steph Cha (born 1986), Korean American novelist and fiction writer
- Cha Tae-hyun (born 1976), South Korean actor
- Cha Tae-sung (1934–2006), South Korean footballer
- Theresa Hak Kyung Cha (1951–1982), South Korean novelist
- Victor Cha (born 1960), American political scientist
- Virginia Cha, American retired news anchor
- Vivian Cha (born 1993), South Korean model, songwriter, record producer
- Cha Woo-chan (born 1987), South Korean former professional baseball player
- Cha Yong-hwa, North Korean artistic gymnast
- Cha Young-chul (born 1959), South Korean sport shooter, Olympic silver medalist
- Cha Young-hwan (born 1990), South Korean footballer
- Cha Young-hyun (born 2003), South Korean figure skater
- Cha Yu-ram (born 1987), South Korean professional pool player
- Cha Yun-hee (born 1986), South Korean retired footballer

=== Stage name ===
- Cha Do-jin (born Im Sung-kyu, 1983), South Korean actor
- Cha Eun-woo (born Lee Dong-min, 1997), South Korean singer and actor, member of boy band Astro
- Cha Mi-kyung (born Kim Mi-kyung, 1965), South Korean actress
- Cha Min-ji (born Kim Min-ji, 1990), South Korean actress
- Cha Seo-won (born Lee Chang-yeob, 1991), South Korean actor
- Cha Woo-min (born Kim Min-woo, 2000), South Korean actor
- Cha Ye-ryun (born Park Hyun-ho, 1985), South Korean actress

== See also ==
- Chal (name)
- Char (name)
- Korean clans of foreign origin
