= Chapa =

Chapa may refer to:

- Chapa (given name), a feminine given name
- Chapa (surname), a surname
- Chavda dynasty (Chapa), a dynasty of Gujarat state of India

== See also ==
- Chapa frog (disambiguation)
- Shaun Chapas, an American football player
- Chappa, a 1982 Indian Malayalam-language film
