= Charig =

Charig is a surname. Notable people with the name include:

- Alan J. Charig (1927–1997), English paleontologist and writer
- Mark Charig (born 1944), British trumpeter and cornetist
- Phil Charig (1902–1960), American musical theatre composer and lyricist

== See also ==
- Chari (surname)
