= Chalia =

Chalia or Chalía may refer to:

== Biology ==
- Chalia, a genus of butterflies in the family Psychidae, synonym of Kotochalia
  - Chalia maledicta

== Place ==
- Chalía River, a river in Argentina
- Chalia (Χαλία), an ancient Greek town of Boeotia

== Name ==
- Chalia, a feminine given name
  - Chalía Herrera, a Cuban soprano
  - Chalia La Tour, an American actress
  - Chalia Bakker, The Drummer of The Tempers
- Chalía, a Spanish diminutive of Rosalía

== See also ==
- Chail (disambiguation)
- Cheilea, gastropod genus
- Chelia, town in Khenchela Province, Algeria
- Chhalia, a 1960 Indian film
- Chhalia (1973 film), a 1973 Indian film
- Shaliah, Jewish legal emissary or agent
- Shelia, a female given name
- Spanish naming customs
