= Chard (surname) =

Chard is a surname. Notable people with the name include:

- Chester S. Chard (1915–2002), American anthropologist
- Clifford M. Chard (active 1900s to 1940s), Australian theatre architect, partner in Kaberry and Chard
- Danny Chard (born 1980), English cricketer
- Don Chard, Canadian politician
- Geoffrey Chard (1930–2026), Australian opera singer
- Herbert Chard (1869–1932), English cricketer
- John Chard (1847–1897), commander of the British garrison at the Battle of Rorke's Drift
- Phil Chard (born 1960), English footballer
- William Chard (1812–1877), American pioneer

== See also ==
- Chad (surname)
- Chard (disambiguation)
- Char (name)
- Chara (given name)
- Chard Hayward (born 1949), Australian television actor
- Chard Powers Smith (1894–1977), American writer
- Charl (name)
- Charo (name)
