= Chala (disambiguation) =

Chala is a region in Peru.

Chala may also refer to:

== Places ==
=== India ===
- Chala, Gujarat, a census town
- Chala, Kannur, a suburb of Kannur in Kerala
- Chala, Thiruvananthapuram, a suburb of Thiruvananthapuram in Kerala

=== Peru ===
- Chala, Peru, a town
- Chala District

=== Elsewhere ===
- Kingdom of Chakla or Chala, a former kingdom in what is now Tibet
- Chala, Bulgaria, village in Smolyan Province, Bulgaria
- Chala, Ozurgeti Municipality, Georgia, a village
- the Hellenistic name of Hulwan, Iran
- Lake Chala, a crater lake that straddles the border between Kenya and Tanzania

== People ==
- Chala (name), a list of people with the surname or given name Chala or Chalá

== Other uses ==
- Chala (Jews), a name given to Bukharan Jews who were forcibly converted to Islam
- Chala bread, a traditional Jewish bread; see Challah
- Chala language, a Gur language of Ghana
- Haplochromis sp. 'Chala', a fish species

== See also ==
- Challa (disambiguation)
- Chail (disambiguation)
- Chal (name)
- Charla (name)
- Char-chala, also known as Jor-bangla Style, of temple architecture developed in Bengal
- Chhal (TV series), Indian television series
- Chhalia, 1960 Indian film
- Chhalia (1973 film), 1973 Indian film
