= Chapa (surname) =

Chapa is a surname. Notable people with the surname include:

- Damian Chapa (born 1963), American actor
- Erick Chapa (21st century), Mexican actor
- María Ceseñas Chapa (born 1952), Mexican politician
- Miguel Ángel Granados Chapa (1941–2011), Mexican journalist
- Rudy Chapa (born 1957), American businessperson
- Tatiana Palacios Chapa (born 1968), Mexican American singer

== See also ==
- Chapa (disambiguation)
- Chapa (given name)
- Chara (given name)
