= Ç̌ =

Letter of the Latin alphabet

C with cedilla and caron
- Ç̌ ç̌

Usage
- Writing system: Latin script
- Type: alphabetic
- Language of origin: Avar language, Georgian language
- Sound values: [t͡ʃʼ]
- In Unicode: U+00C7, U+00e7, U+030c

History
Development
Z4
        - Ζ ζ
          - 𐌆
            - Z z
              - Ꝣ ꝣ
                - Ç ç
                  - Ç̌ ç̌
- Time period: 1993-present
- Transliterations: ЧӀ чӏ, ჭ

C with cedilla and caron (Ç̌ ç̌) is an additional letter used in transliteration of the Laz, Georgian, Avar and Udi languages in certain KNAB romanisations. It is composed of a C with a caron and a cedilla.

== Computing codes ==
C with cedilla and caron can be represented with the following Unicode characters:

Character information
Preview	Ç		ç		̌	
Unicode name	LATIN CAPITAL LETTER C WITH CEDILLA		LATIN SMALL LETTER C WITH CEDILLA		COMBINING CARON	
Encodings	decimal	hex	dec	hex	dec	hex
Unicode	199	U+00C7	231	U+00E7	780	U+030C
UTF-8	195 135	C3 87	195 167	C3 A7	204 140	CC 8C
Numeric character reference	&#199;	&#xC7;	&#231;	&#xE7;	&#780;	&#x30C;
Named character reference	&Ccedil;		&ccedil;			

== See also ==
- Romanization of Cyrillic
