= Chiro =

Chiro may refer to:

- Chiro (town), a town in Ethiopia
- Chiro (woreda), a former district of Ethiopia
- chiro-, a prefix referring to hands, or to chirality
- Chiro Flanders, a Belgian Christian youth organisation
- Chiro Philippines, a Philippine Catholic youth organisation
- Chiro (Super Robot Monkey Team Hyperforce Go!), a fictional character
- Chiropractic, an alternative care practice

== People with the name ==
- Giovanni Di Chiro, Italian-American neuroradiologist
- SJ Chiro, American screenwriter and director
- Chiró N'Toko, Zairian–Belgian footballer

== See also ==
- Charo (disambiguation)
- Cairo, the capital of Egypt
- Chirro
- Chi-Ro, a Japanese tank model
- Chi Rho, a Christian symbol
- Ciro (disambiguation)
- Chiron (disambiguation)
- Cheiro, Irish astrologer
