= Charlo (name) =

Charlo is a given name, nickname, or surname. Notable people with this name include the following:

== Given name or nickname ==
- Charlo (actor) (1905–1990), Argentine actor Carlos José Pérez de la Riestra
- Charlo Greene (born Charlene Egbe), Nigerian-American businesswoman and former reporter/anchor
- Chief Charlo of the Bitterroot Salish

== Surname ==
- Jermall Charlo (born 1990), American boxer
- Jermell Charlo (born 1990), American boxer
- Mo Charlo (born 1983), American basketball player

== See also ==
- Charl (name)
- Charla (name)
- Charlo (disambiguation)
- Charlot (name)
- Charls
- Charly (name)
