= Chmara =

Chmara is a gender-neutral Slavic surname. Alternative spellings include Khmara and Hmara.

Notable people with this surname include:

- Gregori Chmara (1893–1970), Ukrainian-born stage and film actor
- Mirosław Chmara (born 1964), Polish pole vaulter
- Sebastian Chmara (born 1971), Polish decathlete, cousin of Mirosław

== See also ==
- Khmara (disambiguation)
- Khmara (surname)
