= Charting =

Charting may refer to:

- Chart, graphical representation of data
- Nautical chart, process of building a chart of water bodies
- Music chart, ordered list of music sales

== See also ==
- Chart (disambiguation)
