= Charas (disambiguation) =

Charas is a form of cannabis.

Charas may also refer to:

- Charas (1976 film), a 1976 Bollywood film starring Dharmendra and Hema Malini
- Charas (2004 film), a 2004 Bollywood film starring Uday Chopra, Jimmy Sheirgill, Irrfan Khan and Hrishitaa Bhatt
- Charas/El Bohio, a former community center in New York City
- Macabeo also known as Charas Blanc

== See also ==
- Chara (disambiguation)
- Charls
