= Claro (surname) =

Claro is a popular Spanish and Italian surname. The name Claro derived from the Italian word chiari, which means "clear." This nickname surname derived from an eke-name and reflects the physical attributes of its subject. The Claro surname was likely used to refer to a person with a light complexion.

== List of persons with the surname ==
- Adriano Correia (born 1984), Brazilian footballer
- Christophe Claro (born 1962), French writer and translator
- Gerson Claro (born 1967), Brazilian politician
- Giulio Claro (1525–1575), Italian jurist
- Manding Claro (born 1938), Filipino matinee idol
- Manuel Alberto Claro (born 1970), Danish cinematographer
- Nuno Claro (born 1977), Portuguese footballer

== See also ==
- Charo (name)
