= Zubchatyy Ice Shelf =

Ice shelf in Antarctica

Zubchatyy Ice Shelf (67°13′S 49°5′E) is a small ice shelf which borders the south side of Sakellari Peninsula in Enderby Land. Plotted by Russian cartographers from air photos taken by the Soviet Antarctic Expedition, 1961–62. The Russian name means "toothed" and refers to the serrated nature of the ice front when viewed in plan.
