= Chard (disambiguation) =

Chard is a leaf vegetable.

Chard may also refer to:

- Chardonnay or Chard, a grape variety or a varietal wine made from the Chardonnay grape
- Chard (name)
- Chard, Alberta an alternative name for a hamlet of Janvier South, in Canada
- Chard, Creuse, a commune of Creuse, France
- Chard, Somerset, a town in England
  - Chard RFC, an English rugby union team
  - South Chard and Chard Junction, nearby hamlets

== See also ==
- Charo (disambiguation)
