= Chal (name) =

Chal is a given name, nickname and surname. Notable people using this name include the following:

== Given name ==
As a given name:

- Chal Daniel (1921–1943), American gridiron football player and Army pilot

As a portion of a given name (Burmese names do not have surnames):

- Eaint Myat Chal (born 1993), Burmese model and beauty pageant titleholder

== Nickname ==
- A. Chal, nickname of Alejandro Chal whose birthname was Alejandro Salazar, Peruvian singer-songwriter and producer

== Surname ==
- Kelly Chal, New Zealand politician

== See also ==
- Cal (given name)
- Cao (Chinese surname)
- Cha (Korean surname)
- Chad (name)
- Chai (surname)
- Chala (disambiguation)
- Chalk (disambiguation)
- Chaly (surname)
- Chan (surname)
- Chao (surname)
- Char (name)
- Charl (name)
- Chas (given name)
- Chay (given name)
- Chaz
- Coal (disambiguation)
