= Char (Cyrillic) =

Cyrillic Letter Char

Usage
- Writing system: Cyrillic
- Type: Alphabetic
- Language of origin: Lezgian, Dargwa, Tabasaran, Avar
- Sound values: [tʃʼ]
- In Unicode: none

History
- Time period: late 19th century
- Transliterations: Ċh

Char is a letter of the Cyrillic script which was historically used in four Northeast Caucasian languages using Peter von Uslar's alphabets. It was derived from the Georgian Mkhedruli letter Ch'ari (ჭ). It is romanized as Ċh for Dargwa and Lezgian, the languages in which it was formerly used. In 2022, the letter's capital and small versions were among 23 characters proposed for addition to the Unicode standard.

== Usage ==
Char was used in the following languages:

- Lezgian
- Dargwa
- Tabasaran
- Avar

== Gallery ==
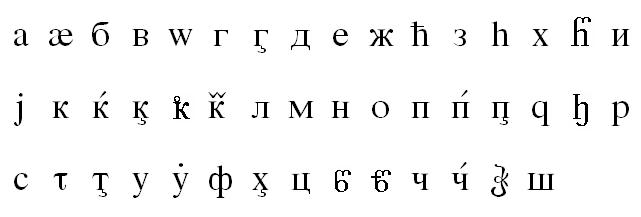
1911 Lezgi alphabet, with char

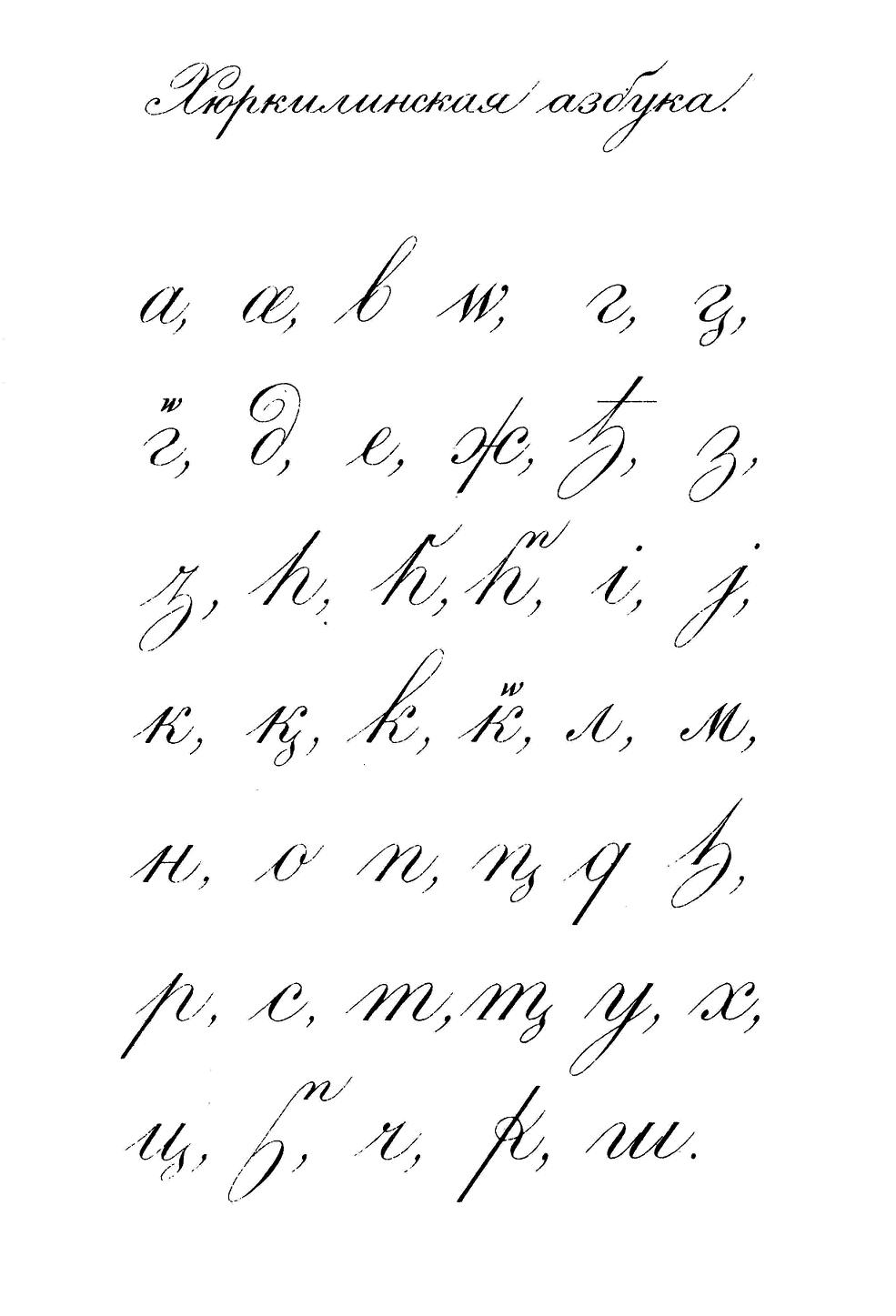
1892 Dargwa alphabet, with char

== See also ==
- Cyrillic script
