= Khmara Island =

Island in Queen Mary Land, Antarctica

- Location within Antarctica

Geography
- Location: Antarctica
- Coordinates: 66°33′S 93°0′E

Administration
- Administered under the Antarctic Treaty System

Demographics
- Population: Uninhabited

Khmara Island is a small island lying 2 kilometres (1 nmi) south of Haswell Island, Queen Mary Coast, Antarctica. It was mapped from aerial photos taken by U.S. Navy Operation Highjump, 1946–47. It was remapped by the Soviet Antarctic Expedition, 1956, and named after tractor driver Ivan F. Khmara.

== See also ==
- List of antarctic and sub-antarctic islands
- Khmara Bay
