= Cape Streten =

Headland in Enderby Land, Antarctica

Cape Streten (66°49′S 49°15′E) is an ice cape at the northeast tip of Sakellari Peninsula, forming the west side of the entrance to Amundsen Bay. Plotted from air photos taken by ANARE (Australian National Antarctic Research Expeditions) in November 1956. Named by Antarctic Names Committee of Australia (ANCA) for Neil Anthony Streten, meteorologist at Mawson Station in 1960.
