= Leslie Ying =

Biomedical engineer

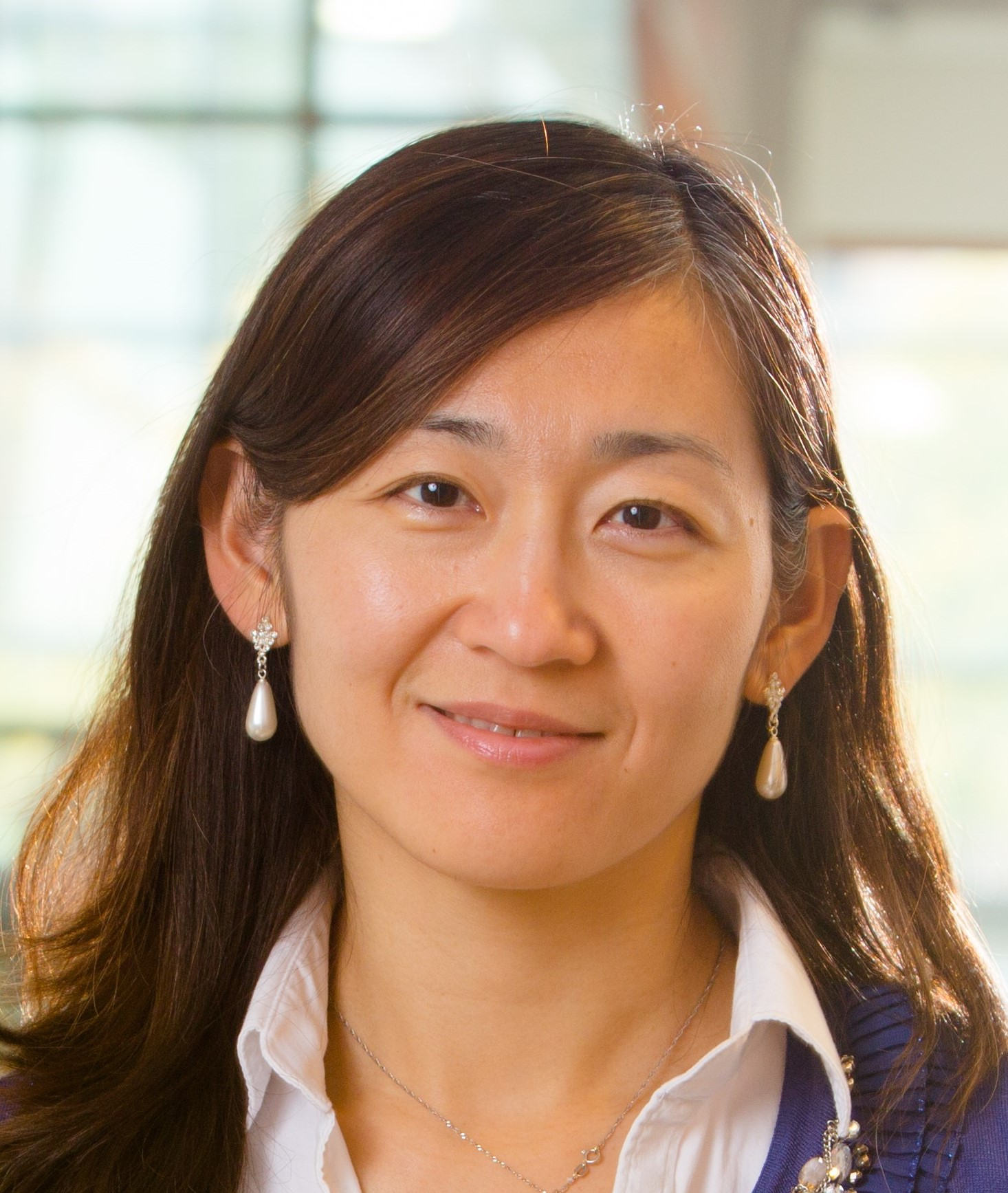
- Education: Tsinghua University; University of Illinois at Urbana–Champaign
- Scientific career
- Fields: Medical imaging
- Workplaces: University of Wisconsin–Milwaukee; University at Buffalo

Leslie Ying is an American biomedical engineering scientist in the field of medical imaging. She is the Clifford C. Furnas Professor of Biomedical Engineering and Electrical Engineering at University at Buffalo, The State University of New York. Ying is the Editor-in-Chief of IEEE Transactions on Medical Imaging and is also an American Institute for Medical and Biological Engineering (AIMBE) Fellow.

== Education ==
Ying graduated with her bachelor's degree in electrical engineering at Tsinghua University in 1997. In 1999 and 2003, respectively, she graduated with her master's degree and Doctorate of Philosophy from the University of Illinois at Urbana-Champaign.

== Career ==
From 2003 to 2011, Ying was an assistant and then associate professor of electrical engineering and computer science at the University of Wisconsin–Milwaukee. She joined the University at Buffalo, the State University of New York in Spring 2012 as a professor in the departments of biomedical engineering and electrical engineering. She was named the Clifford C. Furnas Professor of Electrical and Biomedical Engineering in September 2019.

=== Research interests ===
Ying heads the Computational Biomedical Imaging Laboratory (CBIL) and her research interests center around magnetic resonance imaging. She is specifically interested in image reconstruction, compressed sensing, and machine learning. Her current work involves using parallel magnetic resonance imaging using multichannel receiver coils, sparsity / compressed sensing signal recovery, and super-resolution microscopy. She has published three open source Matlab code libraries: two-dimensional phase unwrapping, joint estimation of coil sensitivities and image in parallel imaging (JSENSE) packages, and Nonlinear GRAPPA: a kernel approach to parallel MRI reconstruction.

=== Professional activities ===
Since 2019, Ying has served as Editor-in-Chief of IEEE Transactions on Medical Imaging. She has also been an associate editor for the IEEE Annual International Conference of Engineering in Medicine and Biology Society since 2008 and for the IEEE International Symposium on Biomedical Imaging since 2013. Ying previously served as deputy editor for Magnetic Resonance in Medicine from 2012 to 2019 and as an associate editor for IEEE Transactions on Biomedical Engineering from 2009 to 2012. She was an editorial board member for Scientific Reports by Nature Research from 2016 to 2019 and for Magnetic Resonance in Medicine in 2012. She was a member of the IEEE Engineering in Medicine and Biology Society administrative committee from 2013 to 2015 and of the technical program committees for the IEEE Engineering in Medicine and Biology Society Annual Conference in 2014 and the IEEE International Symposium on Biomedical Imaging in 2011.

== Awards and patents ==
=== Awards ===
- National Science Foundation CAREER Award, 2009
- Fellow of American Institute for Medical and Biological Engineering (AIMBE), 2019–present
- University at Buffalo SEAS Senior Researcher of the Year Award, 2017
