= Chas =

Chas may refer to:

== Places ==
- Chas, Puy-de-Dôme, a commune in central France
- Chas, Bokaro, a city in Jharkhand, India
- Chas block, an administrative division in Jharkhand, India
- Chas, Khed, a panchayat village in Maharashtra, India
- Capitol Hill Autonomous Zone (CHAZ or CHOP), a self-declared autonomous zone in the Capitol Hill neighborhood of Seattle, Washington in the United States in 2020.

== Newspapers ==
- Chas (newspaper), a Russian-language newspaper in Latvia

== People ==
- Chas (given name), often a nickname for Charles, including a list of people with the name

== Fictional characters ==
- Chas Chandler (comics), a supporting character in the Hellblazer comic series and the main character of Hellblazer Presents: Chas – The Knowledge
- Chas Dingle, on the British soap opera Emmerdale

== See also ==
- Parque Chas, a district of Buenos Aires, Argentina
- Chaz (disambiguation)
