= Ceará (disambiguation) =

Ceará is a state in northeast Brazil.

Ceará may also refer to:

== Sports ==
- Ceará Sporting Club, a Brazilian football team based in the state of Ceará
- Ceará (footballer) (born 1980), Brazilian footballer

== Ships ==
- Brazilian ship Ceará, more than one ship of the Brazilian Navy

== Other ==
- North coast Portuguese, the Cearense dialect of Brazilian Portuguese
- Ceará gnateater (Conopophaga cearae), a passerine bird of the family Conopophagidae
- George Ceara (1880/1881–1939), Aromanian poet and prose writer
- Ceara, a synonym of the moth genus Peoria (moth)

== See also ==
- Ceará-Mirim, a city in Rio Grande do Norte state, Brazil
- Ceará-Mirim River, a river of Rio Grande do Norte state
- Ciara (disambiguation)
- Chiara (disambiguation)
