= Chas (given name) =

Chas is an English unisex given name and nickname, often a short form (hypocorism) of Charles. Notable people referred to by this name include the following:

- Charlie Chas Balun (1948–2009), American writer and film critic
- Chas Betts (born 1986), American Olympic athlete and professional wrestler
- Charles Chas Brownlow (1861–1924), Australian rules football administrator and player
- Bryan Chas Chandler (1938–1996), English musician, record producer and manager, original bassist of The Animals
- Charles Chas Fennell (1902–1970), Australian rugby league player
- Charles Chas. Floyd Johnson (1941), producer, actor, activist
- Chas Gerretsen (born 1943), Dutch war photographer and photojournalist
- Chas Gessner (born 1981), American former National Football League player
- Chas Cronk, English rock singer-songwriter and musician, best known as the bassist for the Strawbs
- Charles Chas Guldemond (born 1987), American snowboarder
- Charles Chas Hodges (1943–2018), English musician and singer, half of the duo Chas & Dave
- Chas Licciardello (born 1977), Australian comedian and member of The Chaser
- Chas McCormick (born 1995), American baseball player
- Charles Chas McDevitt (born 1934), British skiffle musician
- Charles Chas Messenger (1914–2008), British cyclist, organiser and road team manager
- Charles Chas Mortimer (born 1949), British former motorcycle road racer
- Chas Newby (1941–2023), briefly bassist with The Beatles following the departure of Stuart Sutcliffe
- Chas Smash, stage name of English singer-songwriter and multi-instrumentalist Cathal Joseph Smyth (born 1959)
- Chas Skelly (born 1985), American mixed martial artist
- Chas Vincent (born 1977), American politician

== See also ==
- Chas (disambiguation)
- Chal (name)
- Char (name)
- Chaz
