= Charr (disambiguation) =

Charr is a common name for fish of the genus Salvelinus.

Charr may also refer to:

- Arctic charr, a cold-water fish in the family Salmonidae
- Long-finned charr, fish of the genus Salvethymus
- Henri Charr, Assyrian filmmaker
- Mahmoud Charr (born 1984), Syrian professional boxer
- USS Charr, a United States Navy Balao-class submarine
- Charr (clan), clan originally found among the Gurjars of India and Pakistan
- Charr, a 1994 Commodore Amiga game
- Charr, a felinoid playable race in the MMORPG Guild Wars 2

== See also ==
- Beinn Airigh Charr, a mountain in Scotland
- Char (disambiguation)
