= Giovanni Di Chiro =

Italian-American neuroradiologist

Giovanni Di Chiro (October 17, 1926 – August 27, 1997) was an Italian-American neuroradiologist known for his work in the use of medical imaging techniques, such as computer-assisted tomography, to study the central nervous system.

== Early life and education ==
Di Chiro was born in Vinchiaturo, Italy, on October 17, 1926. He was the second of four children of Umberto di Chiro, a professor of Greek and Latin in Campobasso, and his wife, Antonietta. Giovanni began attending school in Campobasso when he was four years old, and he and his family moved to Naples when he was thirteen. During World War II, he studied medicine at the University of Naples, and received his medical degree from there in 1949.

== Career ==
After graduating from the University of Naples, Di Chiro originally intended to travel to Switzerland to work as a cardiologist, but he soon changed his mind and traveled to Sweden instead. While on the train to Stockholm, he met a radiologist who convinced him to pursue a career in radiology. He went on to serve as a radiology resident in multiple Swedish hospitals affiliated with Karolinska University from 1949 to 1953. He then traveled to Boston, Massachusetts, United States, where he began working at the Boston City Hospital on a Fulbright Fellowship in July 1953. In October 1957, he began working at the National Institute of Neurological Diseases and Blindness as a visiting scientist, and in January 1958, he established what became known as its Neuroimaging Branch. He served as head of this branch from its founding until his death in 1997. He served as the founding editor-in-chief of the Journal of Computer Assisted Tomography, and he was also a member of the editorial boards of nine other peer-reviewed journals.

== Personal life and death ==
Di Chiro met Barbara Phillips shortly after he first came to Boston in 1953; they were married on October 9, 1954. They had three children: a daughter, Giovanna, and twin sons, Patrick and Marco. Di Chiro died on August 27, 1997, of cancer at his home in Bethesda, Maryland. On September 12, a memorial service was held in Bethesda, attended by many of his associates, colleagues, family, and friends.
