= Chaz =

Chaz is an English masculine given name or nickname, originally derived from a short form of Charles (abbreviated Chas.), although it is also used occasionally as a short form of other given names such as Chastity or Charlton. Notable people referred to by this name include the following:

== People ==
- Chaz I'Anson (born 1986), English rugby league player
- Chester "Chaz" Bennington (1976–2017), American singer, songwriter, musician, and actor
- Chaz Bono (born 1969), American writer, musician, and actor
- Chaz Brenchley (born 1959), British novel and short story writer
- Chaz Carr (born 1982), Jamaican former basketball player
- Chaz Chambliss (born 2002), American football player
- Chaz Coleman (born 2006), American football player
- Chaz Davies (born 1987), Welsh motorcycle racer and 2011 World Supersport champion
- Chaz Ebert (born 1952), American attorney and businesswoman
- Chaz Green (born 1992), American football player
- Chaz Jankel (born 1952), English musician
- Chaz Lucius (born 2003), American ice hockey player
- DJ Chaz Meads (Charles Meads) (born 1959), American musician, radio DJ and hospitality worker
- Chaz Mee, a pen name of Katy Munger (born 1956), American writer
- Chaz Mostert (born 1992), Australian racing driver
- Chaz Mulkey (born 1981), American Muay Thai kickboxer
- Chaz Robinson (American football) (born 1992), American football player
- Chaz Roe (born 1986), American Major League Baseball pitcher
- Chaz Lamar Shepherd (born 1977), American actor
- Chaz Schilens (born 1985), American football player
- Chaz Stevens (born 1964), American political activist and entrepreneur
- Chaz Thorne (born 1975), Canadian actor and director
- Charles "Chaz" Warrington (born 1971), American professional wrestler under the ring name Mosh
- Chas McCormick (born 1995), outfielder for the Houston Astros baseball team
- Chaz Williams (born 1991), American basketballer

== Fictional characters ==
- Chaz Ashley, the protagonist of the video game Phantasy Star IV: The End of the Millennium
- Chaz McFreely, arrogant stuntman from the video game My Sims
- Chaz Finster, a character from Rugrats
- Chazwick "Chaz" Thurman, an antagonist from Helluva Boss

== See also ==
- Chal (name)
- Char (name)
- Chas (given name)
- Chazz (name)
- Capitol Hill Autonomous Zone (CHAZ)
- Chas (disambiguation)
