= Charlo =

Charlo may refer to:

== Municipalities ==
- Charlo, Montana
- Charlo, New Brunswick

== People ==
- Charlo (name)

== Other ==
- Charlo station, Canadian rail station in Charlo, New Brunswick
- Charlo Airport, Canadian airport in Charlo, New Brunswick
- SoGK Charlo, Swedish sports club

== See also ==
- Charlos (disambiguation)
- Charo (disambiguation)
