= IEEE Transactions on Medical Imaging =

- Discipline: Medical imaging
- Language: English
- Edited by: Ge Wang

Publication details
- History: 1982–present
- Publisher: IEEE
- Frequency: Monthly
- Open access: Hybrid
- Impact factor: 10.048 (2020)

Standard abbreviations
- ISO 4: IEEE Trans. Med. Imaging

Indexing
- ISSN: 0278-0062 (print); 1558-254X (web)
- LCCN: 83640807
- OCLC no.: 909515533

Links
- Journal homepage; Online archive

IEEE Transactions on Medical Imaging is a monthly peer-reviewed scientific journal published by the Institute of Electrical and Electronics Engineers (IEEE). It covers technological aspects of medical imaging techniques. The journal was established in 1982 and is sponsored by four IEEE societies, IEEE Engineering in Medicine and Biology Society, IEEE Signal Processing Society, IEEE Nuclear and Plasma Sciences Society, and IEEE Ultrasonics, Ferroelectrics & Frequency Control Society.

Since 2025, the editor-in-chief is Ge Wang (Rensselaer Polytechnic Institute). Ge Wang's First Editorial, Flagship Toward the Future was published in March 2025.

== Abstracting and indexing ==
The journal is abstracted and indexed in:

- MEDLINE
- PubMed
- Science Citation Index Expanded
- Scopus

According to the Journal Citation Reports, the journal has a 2024 impact factor of 9.8, ranking it 10th out of 175 journals in the category "Computer Science, Interdisciplinary Applications" and 5th out of 212 journals in the category "Radiology, Nuclear Medicine & Medical Imaging".

== Past editors-in-chief ==
Past editors-in-chief
| Name | Term | Specialization |
|---|---|---|
| Michel Ter-Pogossian | 1982–1984 | Nuclear medicine imaging |
| Randy Brill | 1984–1991 | Nuclear medicine imaging and radiology |
| Gabor Herman | 1992–1994 | Medical image processing |
| Michael Vannier | 1994–2002 | Radiology |
| Max Viergever | 2003–2009 | Radiology |
| Milan Sonka | 2009–2014 | Ultrasound |
| Michael Insana | 2015–2019 | Ultrasound |
| Leslie Ying | 2019–2024 | Magnetic resonance imaging |
