= Chapa (given name) =

Chapa is a feminine given name. Notable people with the name include:

- Chapa Herrera (born 1996), American soccer player
- Linda Chapa LaVia (born 1966), American politician
- Nora Chapa Mendoza (born 1932), American artist

== See also ==
- Chapa (disambiguation)
- Chapa (surname)
- Chara (given name)
