= Khmara Bay =

- Залив Хмары (Russian)
- Location: Antarctica
- Coordinates: 67°20′S 49°0′E
- Type: Bay

Khmara Bay (Russian: Залив Хмары) is a small bay lying directly south of Zubchatyy Ice Shelf and Sakellari Peninsula, in Enderby Land, Antarctica. It was photographed by the Australian National Antarctic Research Expedition in 1956 and explored by the Soviet Antarctic Expedition in 1957. It was named by Soviet expedition after tractor driver Ivan F. Khmara, who lost his life when his tractor broke through the ice at Mirnyy Station in January 1956.
