= Ch'ari =

33rd letter of the three Georgian scripts

- Ⴝ ⴝ ჭ Ჭ

Usage
- Writing system: Georgian script
- Type: Alphabetic
- Language of origin: Georgian language
- Sound values: [t͡ʃʼ]
- In Unicode: U+10BD, U+2D1D, U+10ED, U+1CAD
- Alphabetical position: 33

History
- Time period: c. 430 to present
- Transliterations: Ch, Chʼ, Č, Ç̌, Č̣

Other
- Associated numbers: 5000
- Writing direction: Left-to-right

Ch'ari, or Char (Asomtavruli: Ⴝ; Nuskhuri: ⴝ; Mkhedruli: ჭ; Mtavruli: Ჭ; Georgian: ჭარი, ჭარ) is the 33rd letter of the three Georgian scripts.

In the system of Georgian numerals, it has a value of 5000. Ch'ari represents the postalveolar ejective affricate [tʃʼ]. It is typically romanized with the digraphs Ch, and Chʼ, or with the letters Č, Ç̌, and Č̣.

== Letter ==
asomtavruli	nuskhuri	mkhedruli	mtavruli

=== Three-dimensional ===
asomtavruli

nuskhuri

mkhedruli

=== Stroke order ===
asomtavruli

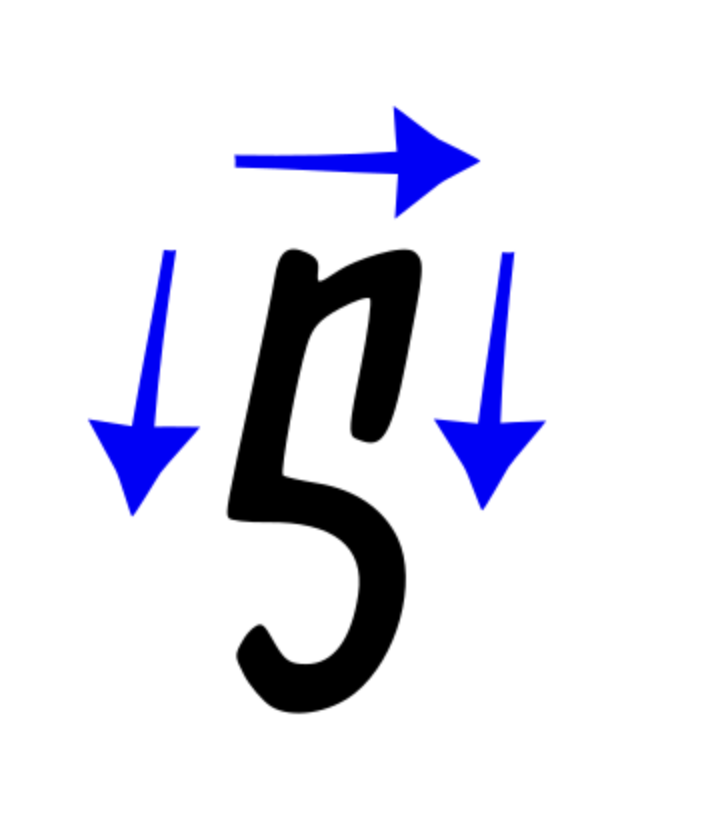
nuskhuri

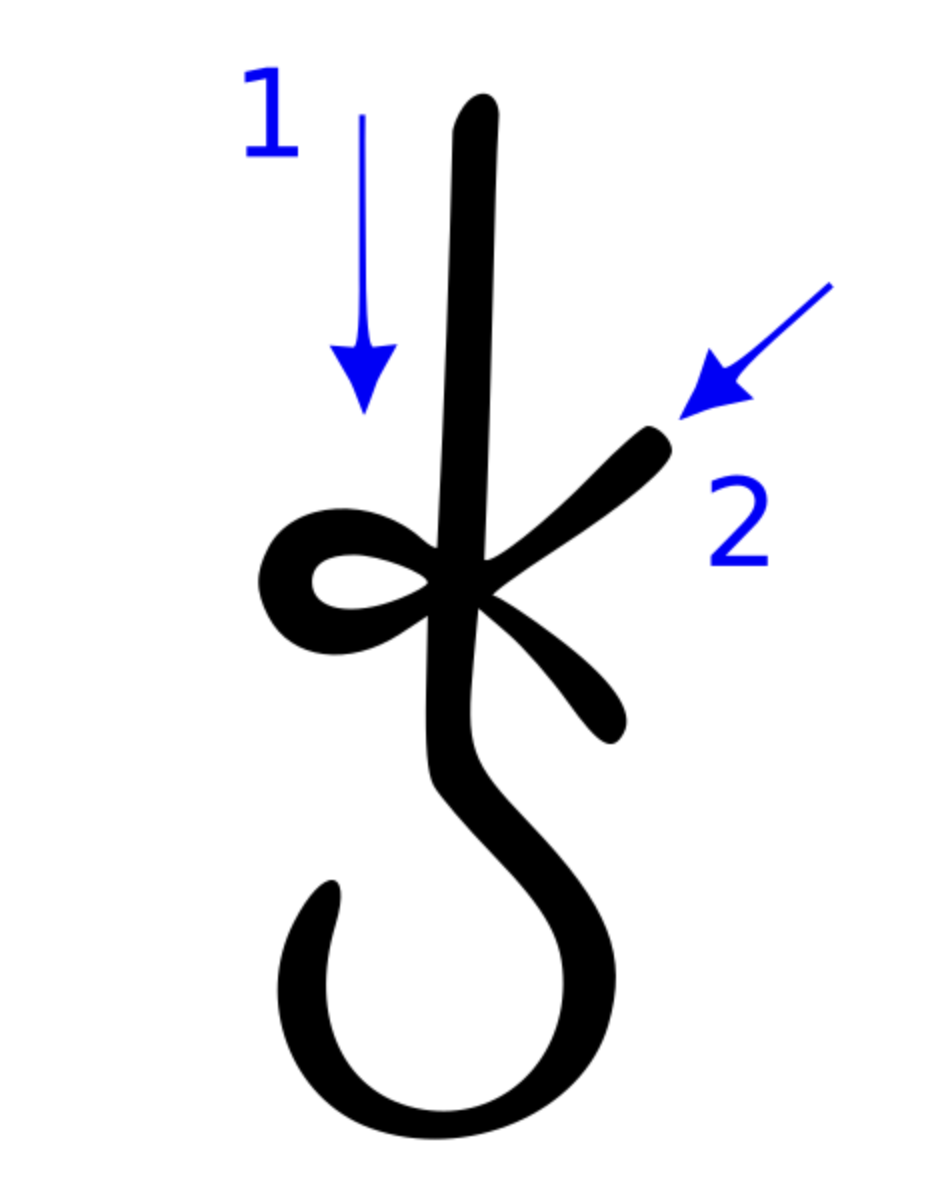
mkhedruli

== Computer encodings ==
Character information
Preview	Ⴝ		ⴝ		ჭ		Ჭ	
Unicode name	GEORGIAN CAPITAL LETTER CHAR		GEORGIAN SMALL LETTER CHAR		GEORGIAN LETTER CHAR		GEORGIAN MTAVRULI CAPITAL LETTER CHAR	
Encodings	decimal	hex	dec	hex	dec	hex	dec	hex
Unicode	4285	U+10BD	11549	U+2D1D	4333	U+10ED	7341	U+1CAD
UTF-8	225 130 189	E1 82 BD	226 180 157	E2 B4 9D	225 131 173	E1 83 AD	225 178 173	E1 B2 AD
Numeric character reference	&#4285;	&#x10BD;	&#11549;	&#x2D1D;	&#4333;	&#x10ED;	&#7341;	&#x1CAD;

== Braille ==
mkhedruli

== See also ==
- Ch (digraph)
- Char (Cyrillic)
- Latin letter Č
- Latin letter Ç̌

== Bibliography ==
- Mchedlidze, T. (1) The restored Georgian alphabet, Fulda, Germany, 2013
- Mchedlidze, T. (2) The Georgian script; Dictionary and guide, Fulda, Germany, 2013
- Machavariani, E. Georgian manuscripts, Tbilisi, 2011
- The Unicode Standard, Version 6.3, (1) Georgian, 1991–2013
- The Unicode Standard, Version 6.3, (2) Georgian Supplement, 1991–2013
