= Island (novel series) =

Novel trilogy by Gordon Korman

Island trilogy boxed set

Island is a novel trilogy by Canadian author Gordon Korman. The books are set in contemporary times and designed for young teenagers.

The series consists of:

- Shipwreck (2000)
- Survival (2001)
- Escape (2001)
- Island Trilogy Bind-Up Book (2006)

== Plot ==
=== Island 1: Shipwreck ===
In Guam, six kids (Luke, Ian, J.J., Charla, Will, and Lyssa) are assembling for a reform programming called "Charting a New Course" (CNC), all sent there by their parents to build character for certain reasons. They meet Captain Cascadden and the first mate Mr. Radford and set sail on the Pacific on the CNC schooner the SS Phoenix.

After a while, they receive news that a freak storm has turned their way and are forced to brave it. During the storm, J.J. thinks it would be best to raise the sails and outrun the storm and tries to raise them himself. He is stopped by Luke and they fight, but during this, a wave knocks J.J. down and an angry captain Cascadden accidentally presses the button that raises the sails. The electricity breaks and the captain attempts to lower the sails manually, but a freak wave washes him overboard.

The next day, Radford realizes the captain is gone and assumes command. Unfortunately, the ship is slowly sinking, and they cannot reach help via radio. Radford eventually leaves one night using the ship's small dinghy and takes most of the food supply with him. Realizing they have to do something, Lyssa attempts to get the motor working again and briefly succeeds, but a freak accident causes the engine to explode, setting ablaze most of the boat. J.J. and Lyssa are lost in the flames and chaos, but Luke, Will, Ian, and Charla escape on a piece of the main cabin's top. With one person hanging off because the raft isn't big enough, they drift through the Pacific for days. Only Ian's know-how saves them because he remembers to bring a rubber hat to collect rainwater. Unfortunately, the rains turn out to be scarce, and Will eventually ends up drinking sea water out of desperation and passing out. The others follow suit until Luke is the only one conscious. They are saved by dolphins who drift them toward an island. On the island, Luke, Ian, and Charla are revived by a downpour of rain and have a toast to their fallen comrades and set off into the jungle to find food, leaving the still-unconscious Will on the raft.

=== Island 2: Survival ===
The three castaways go into the jungle looking for food, leaving the unconscious Will on the beach. They find durians, a strange but edible fruit and go into a feeding frenzy after not eating for weeks. They pass out for a while and awaken a few hours later to fight off a boar. They return to the beach to find a delirious Will, who has amnesia and believes he is still on Guam. Despite the others trying to reason with him, explaining that his sister is dead, he runs off into the woods convinced he and his sister were kidnapped.

The others build a makeshift shelter and begin to forage for food and build signals. Just as Ian explains that the chances of being rescued this early is almost impossible, a plane flies over-head and lands on the other side of the island. Believing they are rescuers, they run to the other side of the island only to witness a murder and learn that the men are illegal smugglers. While they are spying, another plane flies in and a watch dog detects their presence. They run back to camp and decide keeping a low profile is the only way to avoid capture, although it is inevitable.

They decide to try to find Will before the smugglers do because he lives in the jungle. Instead, they wind up meeting their presumed dead companions Lyssa and J.J., the latter of whom explains that he escaped the shipwreck via the ship's inflatable raft and found Lyssa unconscious in the water. Unlike the others, their raft came with freeze-dried meals and were able to survive easily. Will meanwhile meets the boar and befriends him. He confronts Lyssa, who tries to convince him to stay, but he runs off and grabs the last freeze-dried meal and shares it with the boar. He decides to name him Rat-face, but being the nickname of the Phoenix first mate, it ignites his memory and he heads off to join the others. The others, meanwhile, are sniffed out by the doberman and are almost discovered by him. The boar then saves them by ambushing and killing the dog. The smugglers open fire on the beast, killing it and then leaving. It is revealed that a stray bullet struck Will's leg and Ian proclaims that he could become infected and he could die.

As the smugglers leave by plane J.J., Luke, and Charla head to the smugglers camp and discover an old army installation from World War II. While exploring, J.J. falls in a pit revealing the presence of an atomic bomb. Deciding it is too dangerous to let the smugglers find if they were to come back, they cover it and find a newspaper dropped by the smugglers. It is about how Radford, the first mate, was rescued off the coast of China; he lies about how he tried to save them but everyone perished and he alone survived. Now knowing that no one is looking for them, the castaways head back to camp.

=== Island 3: Escape ===
The pressure builds when Will's injury starts to worsen and his fever rises. He begins to become delirious and slips into unconsciousness, and, as Ian states, if he is not taken to a doctor soon, he may not make it. He is given antibiotics from an abandoned army dispensary in the jungle, though the medicine is in short supply. They plan an escape, requiring J.J. to stow away in the smugglers' plane, be ransomed to his rich father, and arrange for the rescue of the castaways.

When the smugglers discover J.J. they threaten him, seeking information about anyone else on the island. He endures a broken arm rather than betray his friends. He is nearly shot, before managing to prove that he is the son of a Hollywood director using his designer sunglasses, and can be ransomed for a significant amount. Held captive for days, he realizes he will be killed once ransom is paid. He escapes, colliding with a police cruiser sent to investigate after J.J.'s father learns that J.J.'s designer glasses are being hawked by one of the kidnappers.

Meanwhile, on the island, Will's fever from the infected bullet wound grows worse, and Luke removes it with Charla's help and Ian's Discovery Channel knowledge, with supplies from the army camp near atomic bomb Junior. Will regains consciousness a few days later, and they all prepare to escape the island on the yellow raft. After sailing for six hours, a U.S. Marine scuba diver contacts them and gets them onto a helicopter that is carrying J.J.

Back in civilization, all are present when the scientists open up Junior, to find the uranium core replaced by a piece of paper with the word "KA-BOOM!!". (It is revealed during several mini-chapters throughout the book that while the army was attempting to move Junior to go home, the crane became stuck. The soldiers decided to simply remove the uranium core and leave the shell on the island so they can go home.) They decide to name the island Junior Island and put it on a map.

Radford is later arrested in a bar and charged with six counts of attempted murder.

The story ends with a reunion by the castaways in J.J.'s luxurious house, though they do not go to the beach.

== Main characters ==
=== Charla Swann ===
Charla Swann is one of the castaways. The reasons for Charla's enrolment in the Charting a New Course program are not immediately evident, but she is eventually revealed to be under intense pressure from her father to overachieve in the field of athletics and suffer from burnout. She is serious and reserved, and she is very self-conscious about her family's financial situation. Because of this, she does not come to trust her fellow castaways until later in the series.

=== Luke Haggerty ===
Luke Haggerty is one of the castaways and the "unofficial official" leader of the group. After he was wrongly convicted of possession of a firearm, he is forced to decide between serving time in a juvenile detention center or enrolling in the Charting a New Course program. He is confident and decisive but prone to angry outbursts. He clashes violently throughout the series with J.J. Lane.

=== J.J. Lane ===
J.J., or Jonathan Junior, is the son of the famous Hollywood actor Jonathan Lane and the oldest of the castaways. He is enrolled in the Charting a New Course program after he performs a series of stunts, each one more outrageous than the last. By his own admission, he performed said stunts to get his father's attention. For most of the series, he believes that the unfortunate events that have befallen them are an elaborate trick to teach them the error of their ways. He is shown as being self-absorbed with a quick temper, particularly getting into fights with Luke Haggerty, but eventually comes to take the situation seriously by the end of the second book, and during the third book, ends up being the ticket to his and the other castaways' rescue.

=== Ian Sikorsky ===
At eleven years old, Ian Sikorsky is the youngest member of the group. He is revealed to be an incredibly lonely person who spends most of his spare time watching television obsessively, most notably the Discovery Channel. While exhibiting moments of boldness, he is usually timid and shy and is distressed when he is forced to abandon his laptop computer for the duration of the trip.

=== Will & Lyssa Greenfield ===
Will & Lyssa Greenfield are a brother-sister duo who have signed up for the Charting a New Course program due to their exaggerated sibling rivalry. Will is the older sibling and Lyssa is the younger sibling. Will struggles with his own self-image, presumably in part due to the way he views Lyssa as being treated, which breeds his resentment towards her. Lyssa proves herself to be confident, intelligent, and capable. She appears to resent her brother for reasons that aren't clear, though it's possible she is merely returning his attitude.

== Others ==
=== James Cascadden ===
The captain of the Phoenix. He is shown to be a kind, calm person. His personality serves to counteract the meanness of Calvin Radford. Captain Cascadden is knocked overboard during the storm and presumed dead.

=== Calvin Radford ===
The Phoenix's first mate. He appears to take sadistic pleasure in watching the children suffer. Shortly after the storm, he steals most of the ship's supplies and leaves in the night. When he himself is rescued, he insists that the rest of the ship's crew died at sea in the storm, but his true actions are revealed to the world when the stranded group is rescued.

=== Dan Rapaport ===
Spokesman for Jonathan Lane. He put a tremendous amount of effort forth to do damage control after each of J.J.'s incidents, but eventually lost his patience and did not argue when Jonathan Lane chose to enroll him in Charting a New Course.

==== Jonathan Lane ====
J.J. Lane's father. While he is shown to care very much for his son, he is described as being an emotionally closed-off father, as well as being the only constant parent J.J. has.
