= Chara (surname) =

Chará or Chára are surnames. Notable people with these surnames include:

- Diego Chará (born 1986), Colombian footballer
- Édison Chará (1980–2011), Colombian footballer
- Felipe Chará (born 1981), Colombian footballer
- Ricardo Chará (born 1990), Colombian footballer
- Virgelina Chará (born 1955), Colombian human rights activist
- Yimmi Chará (born 1991), Colombian footballer
- Zdeno Chára (born 1977), Slovak ice hockey player

== See also ==
- Char (name)
- Charl (name)
- Charla (name)
- Charo (name)
