= Deep tomographic reconstruction =

Deep Tomographic Reconstruction is a set of methods for using deep learning methods to perform tomographic reconstruction of medical and industrial images. It uses artificial intelligence and machine learning, especially deep artificial neural networks or deep learning, to overcome challenges such as measurement noise, data sparsity, image artifacts, and computational inefficiency. This approach has been applied across various imaging modalities, including CT, MRI, PET, SPECT, ultrasound, and optical imaging

== Historical background ==
Traditional tomographic reconstruction relies on analytic methods such as filtered back-projection, or iterative methods which incrementally compute inverse transformations from measurement data (e.g., Radon or Fourier transform data). However, these approaches are not sufficient for certain imaging techniques such as low-dose CT and fast MRI, or scenarios involving metal artifacts and patient motion.

== Use in imaging modalities ==
=== Computed tomography (CT) ===
In CT, deep learning models can be particularly effective in reducing radiation exposure while maintaining image quality. Deep neural networks can also be able to reconstruct images of fair quality from sparsely sampled data without sacrificing diagnostic performance. Deep learning-based generative AI models can reduce CT metal artifacts.

=== Magnetic resonance imaging (MRI) ===
In magnetic resonance imaging (MRI), deep learning can lead to reduced MRI motion artifacts, and increased acquisition speed, referred to as fast MRI. Despite suffering from disadvantages such as lower signal-to-noise ratio (SNR), deep learning can enhance image quality in low field MRI, making these systems clinically viable.

=== Positron emission tomography (PET) and single-photon emission CT (SPECT) ===
For PET imaging, deep learning models can provide substantial improvements in low-dose imaging and motion artifact correction. Also, deep learning can help SPECT for generation of attenuation background. A notable technique for PET denoising involves integrating MR data through multimodal networks, which use anatomical information from MRI to enhance PET image quality.

=== Ultrasound imaging ===
Deep learning can enhance ultrasound imaging by reducing speckle noise and motion blur. For ultrasound beamforming, deep neural networks can allow superior image quality with limited data at high speed.

=== Optical imaging and microscopy ===
Diffuse optical tomography, optical coherence tomography and microscopy can be improved by deep neural networks beyond traditional methods. Furthermore, deep learning can also enhance Photoacoustic imaging (see Deep learning in photoacoustic imaging), addressing challenges like high noise, low contrast, and limited resolution.

Deep learning has also been applied to label-free live-cell imaging, where convolutional neural networks predict fluorescence labels from transmitted light images, a technique known as in silico labeling. This method can enable high-throughput, non-invasive cell analysis and phenotyping without the need for traditional fluorescent dyes.
