= Ger Challa =

Dutch chemist (born 1928)

Gerrit "Ger" Challa (born 18 December 1928) is a Dutch chemist. He was professor of chemistry and polymer technology at the University of Groningen from 1965 to 1993.

Challa was born in Amsterdam. He studied chemistry between 1946 and 1953. He worked ten years for the Institute of Cellulose Research of the Algemene Kunstzijde Unie. Challa obtained his title of doctor in maths and physics on 13 May 1959 under Jan Ketelaar at the University of Amsterdam. His thesis was titled: "Formation of polyethylene terephthalate by ester interchange : equilibria kinetics and molecular weight distribution". After starting as professor at the University of Groningen he set the possibility to study polymer chemistry. Challa also developed the research department.

He was elected a member of the Royal Netherlands Academy of Arts and Sciences in 1986. Since 1998 he is also an honorary member of the Royal Netherlands Chemical Society.
