= Dargin alphabets =

Orthography of Dargwa

Dargin writing is a written form of communication representing the North East Caucasian Dargin language. This language has approximately 439,000 speakers, most of whom live in the Russian republic of Dagestan. Additionally, Dargin writing is used in the Russian Republics of Kalmykia, Khantia-Mansia, and Chechnya, as well as nearby countries of Azerbaijan, Kazakhstan, Kyrgyzstan, Turkey, Turkmenistan, Ukraine, and Uzbekistan.

== Arabic script ==
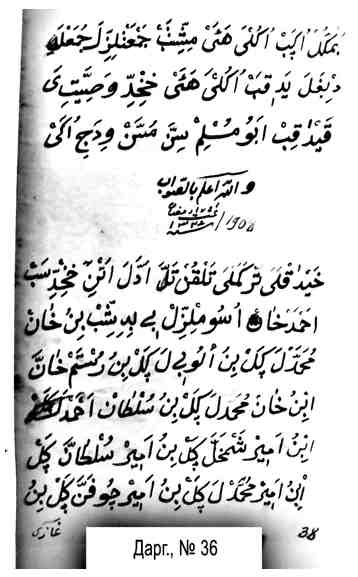
Dargin manuscript from 1908

The Dargins used the Arabic alphabet for centuries before the adoption of Latin.

The Arabic alphabet for Dargwa, before it was replaced by Latin in 1928, looked like this:

Dargin Arabic alphabet (1920-1928)
Arabic (Cyrillic equivalent) [IPA]	آ / ـا ‌( А а ) [a]	أ / ـأ ‌( Я я ) [æ]	ئە / ـە ‌(Е е / Э э) [e]	ب ‌(Б б) [b]	پ ‌(П п‌) [p]	ت ‌(Т т) [t]
Arabic (Cyrillic equivalent) [IPA]	ث ‌(С с) [s]‍	ج ‌(ЧӀ чӀ) [t͡ʃʼ]	ڃ ‌(Є є) [ç]	چ ‌(Ч ч) [t͡ʃ]	ح ‌(ХӀ хӀ) [ħ]	خ ‌(Х х) [χ]
Arabic (Cyrillic equivalent) [IPA]	څ ‌(Хъ хъ) [q]	د ‌(Д д) [d]	ذ ‌(З з) [z]	ر ‌(Р р) [r]	ز ‌(З з) [z]	ڗ ‌(ЦӀ цӀ) [t͡sʼ]
Arabic (Cyrillic equivalent) [IPA]	ژ ‌(Ж ж) [ʒ]	س ‌(С с) [s]	ش ‌(Ш ш) [ʃ]	ص ‌(S s) [s]	ض ‌(З з) [z]	ڞ ‌(З з) [t͡s]
Arabic (Cyrillic equivalent) [IPA]	ڝ ‌(Ц ц) [t͡s]	ط ‌(ТӀ тӀ) [tʼ]	ظ ‌(З з) [z]	ع ‌(ГӀ гӀ) [ʕ]	غ ‌(Гъ гъ) [ʁ]	ڠ ‌(Къ къ) [qː]
Arabic (Cyrillic equivalent) [IPA]	ف ‌(Ф ф / В в) [f] / [v]	ڢ ‌(ПӀ пӀ) [pʼ]	ق ‌(Кь кь) [qʼ]	ک ‌(К к) [k]	ࢰ ‌(КӀ кӀ) [kʼ]	ؼ ‌(Хь хь) [xː]
Arabic (Cyrillic equivalent) [IPA]	گ ‌(Г г) [g]	ل ‌(Л л) [l]	م ‌(М м) [m]	ن ‌(Н н) [n]	و ‌(В в) [w]	او / و ‌(У у) [u]
Arabic (Cyrillic equivalent) [IPA]	اوٓ / وٓ ‌(О о) [o]	ھ ‌(Гь гь) [h]	ی ‌(Й й) [j]	ای / ی ‌(И и) [i]	ء ‌(Ъ ъ) [ʔ]	

== Uslar's Cyrillic ==
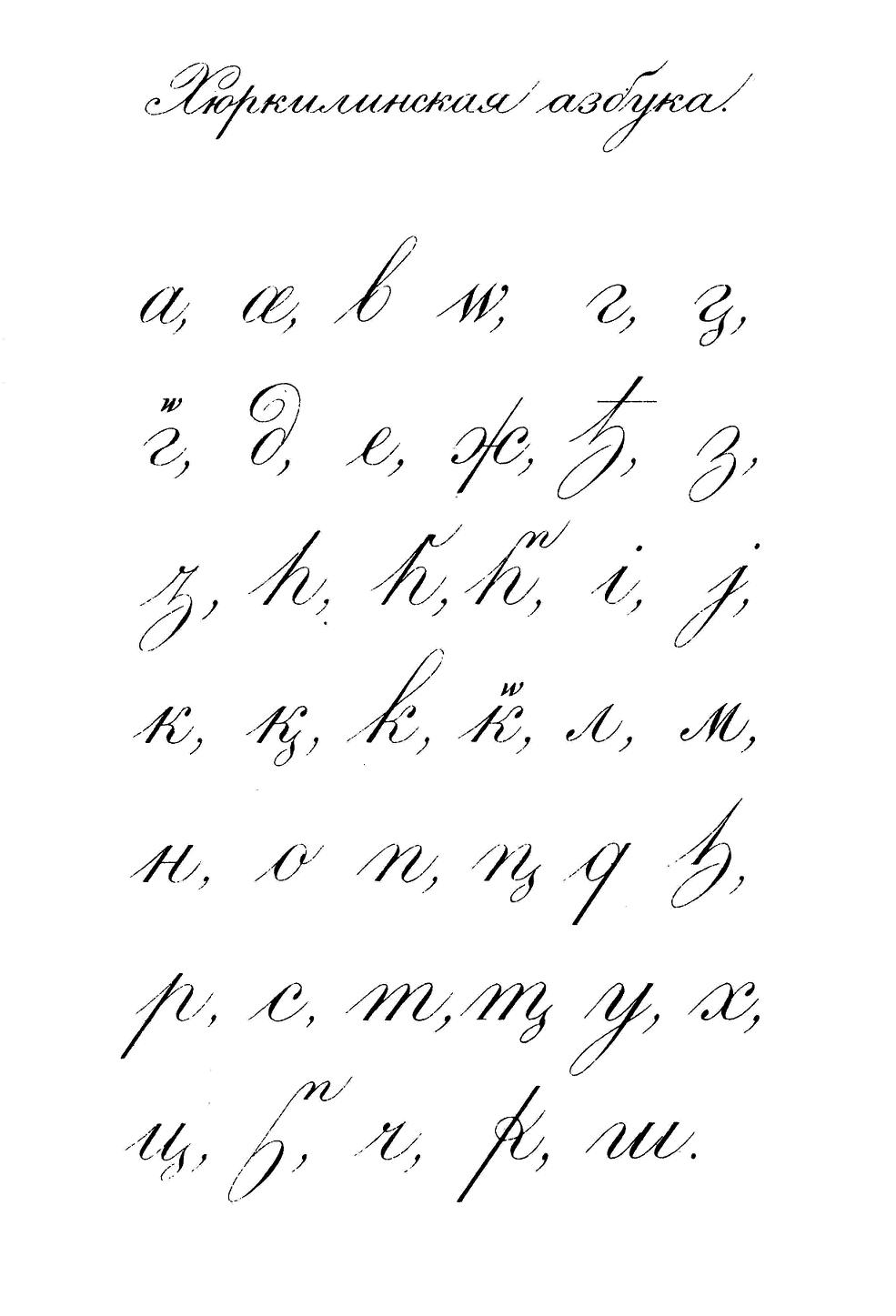
Uslar's 1892 alphabet

In 1892, Peter von Uslar published his grammar on the Urakhi dialect (or Khyurkili), which included an alphabet for it in Cyrillic. It is displayed below.

а	ӕ	в	ԝ	г	ӷ	гᷱ	д
е	ж	ђ	з	ӡ	һ
і	ј	к	қ		кᷱ	л	м
н	о	п	ԥ	ԛ		р	с
т	ҭ	у	х	ц		ч
ш

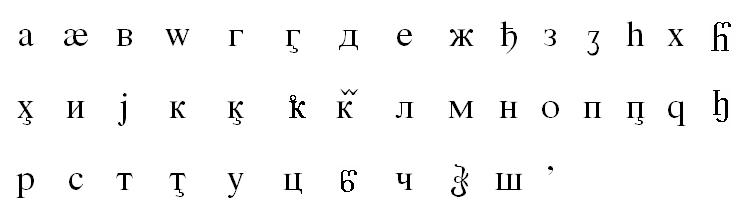
Modified 1911 alphabet

In 1911, it was modified further.

== Latin script ==
The Arabic alphabet was adapted as the Dargin phonetics alphabet in 1920, but it was poorly adapted to the sounds of the Dargin language. So in 1928, as part of the All-Union project on Romanization, the Latin-based alphabet was adopted for Dargin. In the same year, the first primer in this alphabet was published (cupanov r. Nuşala ʐaꝗ-sawet. Mәħәc-qala, 1928). Initially the Dargin Romanized alphabet had no capital letters.

a	b	c	ꞓ	ç	d	e	ә	f
g	ǥ	ƣ	h	ⱨ	ħ	i	j	k
ⱪ	l	m	n	o	p		q	ꝗ
r	s	ş	ꟍ	t	t̨	u	v	x
		z	ⱬ	ƶ	ⱬ̵

After the reform of 1932, capital letters were introduced, some Latin letters were excluded and the alphabet took the form shown in the table below:

A a	B b	C c	Ç ç	D d	E e	Ә ә	F f
G g	Ƣ ƣ	H h	Ⱨ ⱨ	Ħ ħ	I i	J j	K k
Ⱪ ⱪ	L l	M m	N n	O o	P p	Q q	Ꝗ ꝗ
R r	S s	Ş ş	Ꟍ ꟍ	T t	T̨ t̨	U u	V v
X x	Ҳ ҳ	Ӿ ӿ	Z z	Ⱬ ⱬ	Ƶ ƶ	Ⱬ̵ ⱬ̵	Ӡ ӡ

== Modern alphabet ==
The Cyrillic alphabet was adopted in 1938. In the 1960s, the letter ПI, пI was added.

А а	Б б	В в	Г г	Гъ гъ	Гь гь	ГӀ гӀ	Д д
Е е	Ё ё	Ж ж	З з	И и	Й й	К к	Къ къ
Кь кь	КӀ кӀ	Л л	М м	Н н	О о	П п	ПӀ пӀ
Р р	С с	Т т	ТӀ тӀ	У у	Ф ф	Х х	Хъ хъ
Хь хь	ХӀ хӀ	Ц ц	ЦӀ цӀ	Ч ч	ЧӀ чӀ	Ш ш	Щ щ
Ъ ъ	Ы ы	Ь ь	Э э	Ю ю	Я я
