= Seshadri Chari =

Indian journalist

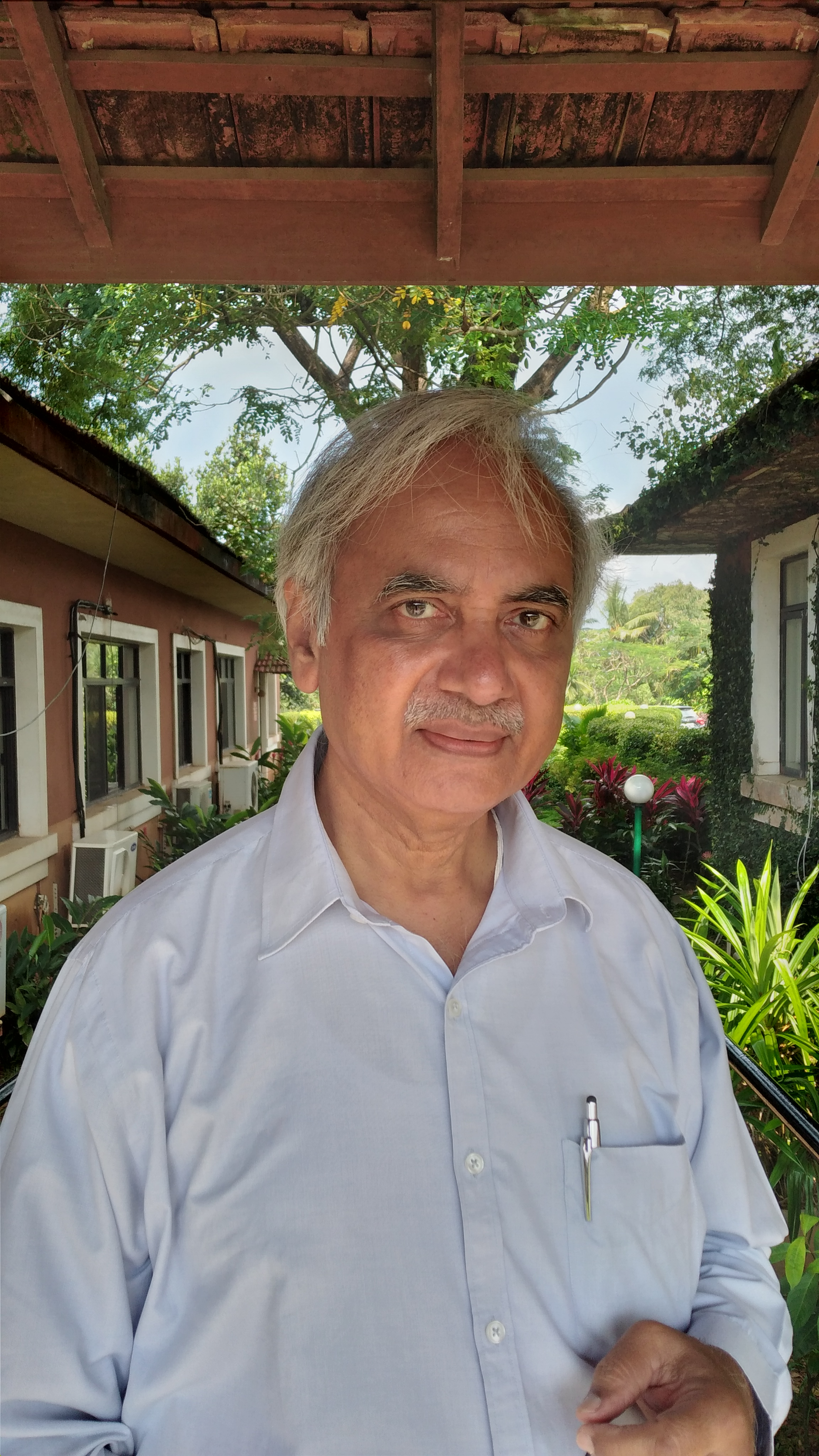

Personal details
- Party: Bharatiya Janata Party
- Education: University of Mumbai (BCom, LLB, MA); Manipal Academy of Higher Education (PhD)
- Occupation: Journalist, writer, politician, political organiser, foreign policy analyst

Seshadri Ramanujan Chari is an Indian politician, journalist, writer, and foreign policy analyst. He is a swayamsevak, or ideologue, of the Rashtriya Swayamsevak Sangh (RSS).

Involved in political organising, Chari currently serves on the national executive committee of the Bharatiya Janata Party (BJP) and formerly served as head of BJP foreign policy.

== Early life and education ==
He earned his Bachelor of Commerce, Bachelor of Laws, and Master of Arts in History degrees from the University of Mumbai. He was awarded a PhD by Manipal Academy of Higher Education (MAHE) for his thesis on "Regional Dynamics of Indo-Pacific Region and Implications of China's Influence in India's Extended Neighbourhood".

== Career ==
Post Emergency, he became a RSS pracharak, first in Mumbai Mahanagar and then Thane. In 1988, he was transferred to the Bharatiya Janata Party where he became the general secretary of the BJP Mumbai unit.

Chari rose to prominence as editor of the RSS's weekly journal Organiser, from 1992 to 2004.

In 2007, Chari was president of the party worker training cell at the RSS, where he was considered a moderate.

Chari is currently the director of international affairs at the Institute for National Security Studies (INSS), the director at the Forum for Strategic & Security Studies (FSSS), and the secretary-general at the Forum for Integrated National Security (FINS).

== Bibliography ==
- Raghavan, G N S; Chari, Seshadri (1996). A new era in the Indian polity: a study of Atal Bihari Vajpayee and the BJP. Gyan Publishing House. ISBN 9788121205399.
- Chari, Seshadri (1996). Reservation for Christians: What Next?. Suruchi Prakashan.
