= Chharra Rafatpur =

- Town
- Location in Uttar Pradesh, India Chharra Rafatpur (India)
- Coordinates: 27°56′N 78°25′E
- Country: India
- State: Uttar Pradesh
- District: Aligarh

Population (2011)
  - Total: 21,146

Language
  - Official: Hindi
  - Additional official: Urdu
- Time zone: UTC+5:30 (IST)
- Vehicle registration: UP
- Website: up.gov.in

Chharra Rafatpur is a town and a nagar panchayat in Aligarh district in the state of Uttar Pradesh, India.

== Demographics ==
As of the 2011 Indian Census, Chharra Rafatpur had a total population of 21,146, of which 11,052 were males and 10,094 were females. The population within the age group of 0 to 6 years was 3,044. The total number of literates in Chharra Rafatpur was 11,296, which constituted 53.4% of the population; male literacy was 60.3%, and female literacy 45.9%. The effective literacy rate of the 7+ population of Chharra Rafatpur was 62.4%, with a male literacy rate of 70.5% and a female literacy rate of 53.6%. The Scheduled Castes population was 1,677. Chharra Rafatpur had 3274 households in 2011.

== Transportation ==
Chharra Rafatpur is 40 km from district headquarters Aligarh, Uttar Pradesh, India. The only way to commute to this place is by road.
