= Cha Chol-ma =

North Korean businessman

- Hangul: 차철마
- RR: Cha Cheolma
- MR: Ch'a Ch'ŏlma

Cha Chol-ma (Korean: 차철마, born in Pyongyang, March 13, 1956) is a North Korean businessman believed to be one of the wealthiest individuals in the country.

Cha reportedly worked for the Ministry of Foreign Affairs in the past. Cha held senior positions within the Supreme People's Assembly from 2012 until around 2015 or 2016.

Cha monopolized foreign currency businesses run by the Supreme People's Assembly, earning more than US$100,000,000. He has overseen business developments in Pakistan and the People's Republic of China, as well as domestic economic and infrastructure projects.

Cha is the son-in-law of Ri Je-gang, a North Korean politician close to Kim Jong Il.
