= Chara M. Curtis =

American writer

Chara M. Curtis is a writer and children's book author from Minnesota.

== Biography ==
Chara Mahar Curtis was born in Minnesota, worked in advertising and music publishing in Chicago and Nashville before becoming a full-time writer.

Chara has lived in a variety of places, including northern Wisconsin, Nashville, Chicago, and Istanbul. She now makes her home near the San Juan Islands of Washington.

She is a daughter of Radio/TV News & Sports personality Harold Richard "Dick" Eugene Mahar and Gloria Estelle LaValleur Mahar Shemorry and has six siblings (in order of age): Richard, Pamela, Jennifer, twins Debra & Douglas, and Bonnie.

== Bibliography ==
- How Far to Heaven (1993)
- All I See Is Part of Me (1994)
- No One Walks on My Father's Moon (1996). Voyage Publishing. ISBN 978-0-9649454-1-8.
- Fun Is a Feeling (1998)

== Awards ==
- 1996 Body Mind Spirit Magazine Award of Excellence for All I See is Part of Me
- 1997 Washington State Governor's Writers Award for No One Walks on My Father's Moon
