= Hugh Cha =

South Korean entertainer (born 1985)

Hugh Cha (휴차)
- Born: 6 September 1985 (age 41); Incheon, South Korea
- Other name: Cha Hyung-jin (차형진)
- Education: Boston Conservatory
- Occupations: Producer; talent manager; actor
- Years active: 2011–present
- Height: 1.73 m (5 ft 8 in)

Korean name
- Hangul: 차형진
- RR: Cha Hyeongjin
- MR: Ch'a Hyŏngjin
- Website: desertbloompictures.com

Cha Hyung-jin (Korean: 차형진; born 6 September 1985), better known in America as Hugh Cha (휴차), started out as a Korean American actor on Broadway and TV who transitioned into a studio executive focused on international business development and strategy as the Director of the Asia Division at Bohemia Group and CEO of Stage Bridge. Following this role, Cha became the Head of Global Partnerships at Lotte Entertainment under Lotte Cultureworks, and then later promoted to Head of Global Sales and Strategy until May 2025 when the company merged their cinema chains and film businesses with Megabox Joongang due to industry market challenges.

Cha recently collaborated on a four-film partnership as an executive at Desert Bloom Pictures with Indonesia-based Mandela Pictures. The partnership's purpose is to create a project pipeline that brings together Indonesia, Korea and Hollywood markets using the strengths of both production companies. Prior to the production partnership deal, Cha has been working on the K-Pop Thriller "Perfect Girl" which includes actresses May Hong and Arden Cho from KPop Demon Hunters.

His early works on stage include The King and I (2013) and Anything Goes (2014). His film work includes The Destined King as the lead role of Yushin the sword master, Seeking: Jack Tripper as Jesse, and the indie film A Story of the Woods.

Cha has also appeared as a co-star in several American TV series including FX Networks' The Americans, HBO's show Crashing, and NBC's thriller series The Blacklist.

== Early life ==
Cha first became interested in performing arts while attending college at Brigham Young University (BYU) in Utah. He became president of the Breakdance Club (2005-2007), joined the professional dance troop “Ground Hounds Crew” and was given the nickname “Bboy Handsome Hugh” because of his dance fashion. Cha performed and competed with the dance crew, and hosted multi-state hip-hop events with thousands of attendees.

The "Ground Hounds Crew" was previously known as the "Junk Yard Dogs (JYD)". As "Handsome Hugh", Cha starred in a breakdancing spec commercial for Novell.

=== Military service ===
In June 2007, Cha enlisted in the Republic of Korea Army to serve his mandatory military service at the age of 23.

Cha underwent five weeks of basic training and was drafted into active duty at Sangmudae. He completed his military service as a sergeant.

After serving two years of active duty, Cha returned to the United States and graduated from BYU with a BFA in Music Dance Theater and moved to New York City to pursue his entertainment career. He worked at various part-time jobs before getting his MFA graduate degree in Musical Theater from the Boston Conservatory.

In 2013, Cha was selected as one of the most influential men of the Boston Korean community.

== Career ==
=== Production ===
Cha started his studio production career as Director of the Asia Division of Bohemia Group, which handles talent management, and Bohemia Originals, which focuses on production. He also founded Stage Bridge Inc. in NYC and served as its CEO.

His production projects include TV adaptation of Korean IP 'Deep' as CEO of Stage Bridge; 'Theory of Gastronomy' in Korean cinemas as CEO of Desert Bloom Pictures in collaboration with LOTTE; and K-pop thriller 'Perfect Girl' that includes Arden Cho and May Hong from KPop Demon Hunters on Netflix.

=== Stage ===
Cha had his first major acting role on stage at Lyric Theater of Oklahoma in The King and I in 2013 in which he played 'Lun Tha', a scholar who visits the kingdom to copy a design for a temple and falls in love with the slave girl Tuptim.

According to News of Oklahoma, "Yoon Jeong Seong and Hugh Cha are nicely matched as Tuptim and Lun Tha, the Burmese lovers whose fate ultimately rests in the King's hands. Seong, in tandem with Cha, is mesmerizing in 'We Kiss in a Shadow' and 'I Have Dreamed.'"

In June 2014, Cha played 'Luke' in North Shore Music Theatre's production of Anything Goes. His comical bits within the production as a supporting cast member were noted by local news outlets.

At Brooklyn Repertory Theatre (BFE) in 2015, Cha played the role of 'Lefty' in a short story about a serial killer in suburbia targeting blonde cheerleaders.

Cha then appeared as the main character 'Fan' in Time Difference at C.O.W. Theater in NYC. The short play is based on a young Chinese couple in a long-distance relationship, with one in China and the other in the U.S. The performance was part of the Theater Masters MFA Playwrights Festival in 2015, which featured several short plays published by Samuel French.

In January 2017, Hugh Cha portrayed an ensemble cast role of 'Steve' in Blueprint Specials at the Intrepid Sea, Air & Space Museum on the interior hangar deck of a U.S. Navy aircraft carrier that served during World War II, the Cold War, and the Vietnam War. The production centers on a collection of lost Frank Loesser musicals commissioned by the U.S. Army during WWII and is part of the Public Theater's Under the Radar Festival.

Cha played both clarinet and saxophone instruments as band member 'Abraham' in the NYC musical Sweetee, which centers on the power of music in 1930s America. The limited Off-Broadway play ran from June 1–18, 2017 and was directed by Emmy-winner and Tony-nominee Patricia Birch.

=== Film and television ===
Cha was cast in Oxygen Network's TV series My Crazy Love in 2014 as Dr. Jeff Kim.

He then appeared in the short film Seeking: Jack Tripper as Jesse. The film received an Audience Award for "Best Narrative Short Film" at the Newport Beach Film Festival in California, and won "Best Comedy" at the New York City Short Film Festival.

In 2016, Cha appeared in several TV series and short films. He played the lead role of Yushin in The Destined King, a Korean short film that follows the story of a veteran warrior as he flees from the carnage of political chaos with an infant born with the destiny of a king. The film received an Honorable Mention in the "Best Action/Adventure" category at the Asians on Film Festival in the summer of 2015, and won an award for "Best Short Film" at the Urban Action Showcase International Film Festival (UAS IAFF) in 2015.

He also co-starred in FX Networks' The Americans, a show about two KGB spies in an arranged marriage posing as Americans during Ronald Reagan's presidency, as well as HBO’s series Crashing in 2017, which is about a New York comic who is forced to make a new start for himself after his wife leaves him.

Cha's next TV appearance will be in Season 6 of NBC's The Blacklist which is an American thriller series.

=== Martial Arts ===
Cha specializes in several forms of martial arts. He received a 3rd Dan in Taekwondo from United Tae Kwon Do NYC, which is now called Supreme Martial Arts school, and is a ranked practitioner of Kendo and Iaido: Siljun Dobup (Katana Sword) from Sword Class NYC. Cha has also been trained in Nunchuck, Wushu, Shaolin Kung Fu and Jujitsu, and has received kickboxing and film combat training.

Cha has a 1st Dan in Josunsebup (Korean Sword) certified by the Gumdo Foundation. He continues to improve his training on Jeek Kun Do, Capoeira, Kali, Krav Maga, Muay Thai, MMA and boxing at Unlimited Martial Arts in New York. Cha is also working on his Tai Chi certification at CK Chu Taichi.

== Filmography ==
=== Film ===
Year	Title	Role	Language
2015	Seeking: Jack Tripper	Jesse	English
2016	The Destined King (운명의 왕)	Yushin	Korean

=== Television series ===
Year	Title	Role	Notes
2014	My Crazy Love	Dr. Jeff Kim	Main character
2016	The Americans	Don's Sister's Husband	Co-star
2017	Crashing	Business Man	Co-star
2018	The Blacklist	U.N. Guard	Co-star

=== Theatre ===
Year	Title	Role	Location	Director
2013	The King and I	Lun Tha	Lyric Theatre in Oklahoma	Dir. Alan Muraoka
2014	Anything Goes	Luke	North Shore Theater in MA	Dir. Charles Repole
2015	Time Difference	Fan	C.O.W. Theater in NYC	Dir. Tyler Haven Holt
2015	BFE	Lefty	The Kraine Theater in NYC	Dir. Joseph Hayward
2017	Blueprint Specials	Steve	Intrepid Sea, Air & Space Museum in NYC	Dir. Tom Ridgely
2017	Sweetee	Abraham	Ford Foundation Studio Theatre in NYC	Dir. Patricia Birch
