= Charo (disambiguation) =

Charo is the stage name of María Rosario Pilar Martínez Molina Baeza, a Spanish-American entertainment personality.

Charo may also refer to:

- Charo (name), a given name, nickname or surname
- Charo Municipality, a Mexican locale
- Cerro de Charo, a hill in Spain

== See also ==
- Charro
- Charos Kayumova
- Chiro (disambiguation)
- Chao (disambiguation)
- Chapo (disambiguation)
- Charlo (disambiguation)
- Charm (disambiguation)
- Chart (disambiguation)
- Chiro (disambiguation)
