= Chala, Ozurgeti Municipality =

Chala ჭალა
- Village
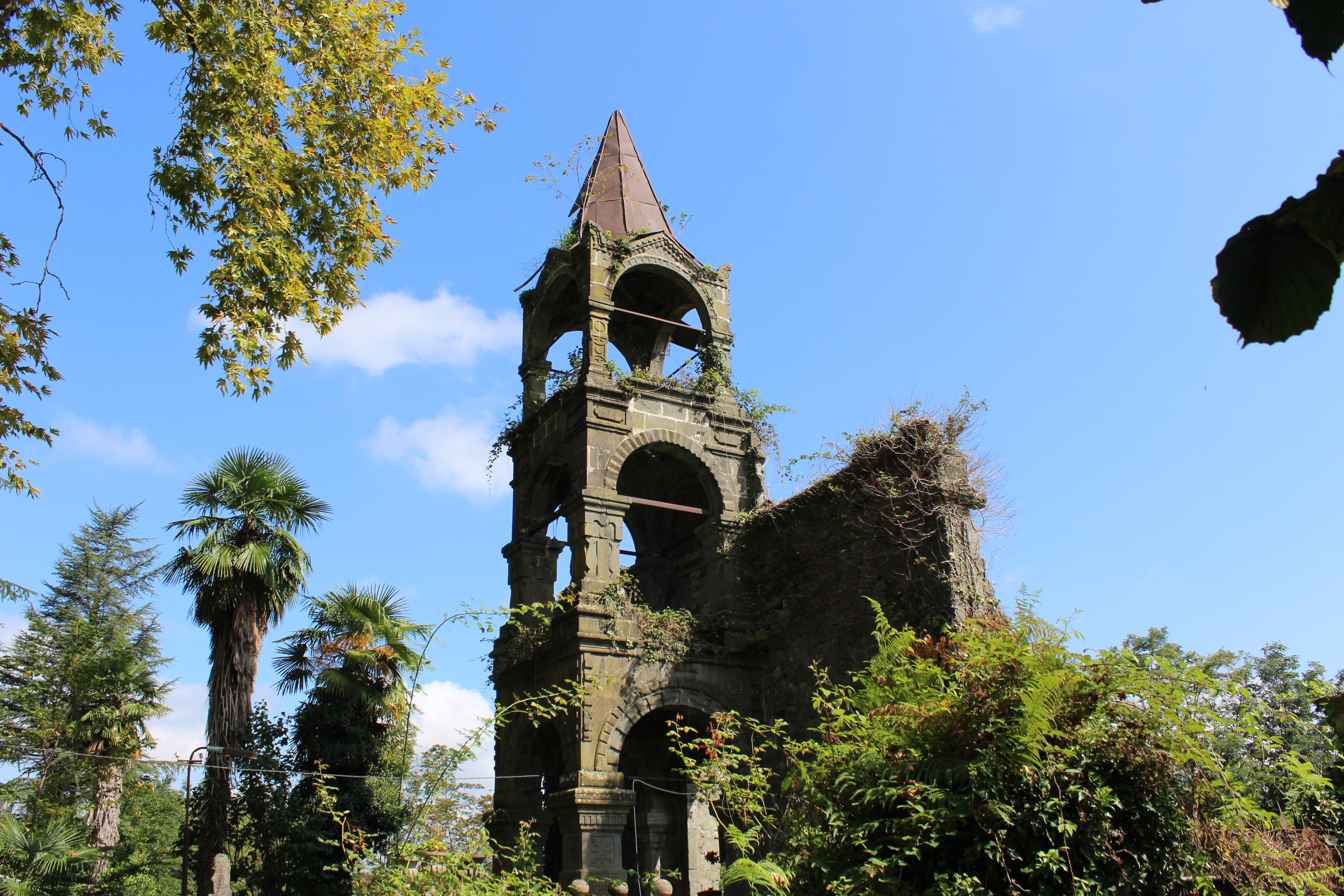

- Location within Georgia Location within Guria
- Coordinates: 41°55′34″N 42°03′31″E
- Country: Georgia
- Mkhare: Guria
- Municipality: Ozurgeti
- Elevation: 150 m (490 ft)

Population (2014)
  - Total: 408
- Time zone: UTC+4 (Georgian Time)

Chala (Georgian: ჭალა) is a village in the Ozurgeti Municipality of Guria in western Georgia.
