= María Ceseñas Chapa =

Mexican politician

- Born: 2 January 1952 (age 74); Monterrey, Nuevo León, Mexico
- Occupation: Deputy
- Political party: PRD

María del Socorro Ceseñas Chapa (born 2 January 1952) is a Mexican politician affiliated with the PRD. As of 2013 she served as Deputy of the LXII Legislature of the Mexican Congress representing Nuevo León.
