= Char =

Char may refer to:

== People ==
=== Job titles ===
- Char, short for charwoman, a historical term for someone who does part-time cleaning

=== Fictional characters ===
- Char (Ninjago)
- Char Aznable, from the Gundam media franchise

=== Individuals ===
- Char Fontane, American actress
- Char Margolis, American spiritualist
- René Char (1907–1988), French poet
- The Char family of Colombia:
  - Fuad Char, Colombian senator
  - Alejandro Char Chaljub, mayor of Barranquilla
  - Arturo Char Chaljub, Colombian senator
  - David Char Navas, Colombian senator
  - Sofia Daccarett Char, better known as Sofia Carson, American actress and singer
- Char (musician), stage name of Japanese musician Hisato Takenaka (born 1955)

== Other uses ==
- River Char, a river in Dorset, England
- Char (chemistry), the solid material that forms during the initial stage of combustion of a carbonaceous material
- Char (fish), a common name for fishes in the genus Salvelinus, including Arctic char
- A char in ANSI/ISO C is a value holding one byte (which was the size of a character in legacy encodings such as ASCII)
- A common slang term for tea throughout the British Empire in the 19th and 20th centuries
- A characteristic (algebra) of a ring in mathematics
- Char (Cyrillic), a disused letter
- Any French tank (from char d'assaut), but more specifically one with a short designation such as:
  - Char B1, a French heavy tank manufactured before the Second World War
  - Char 2C, a super-heavy French tank developed during the First World War
  - Char D1, a pre-World War II French tank
  - Char D2, a French tank of the Interbellum
  - Char G1, a French replacement project for the Char D2 medium tank
  - Char, as an abbreviation of Character

== See also ==
- Charr (disambiguation)
- Chars, commune in France
