= Charo Sádaba Chalezquer =

Spanish advertising professor

Charo Sábada
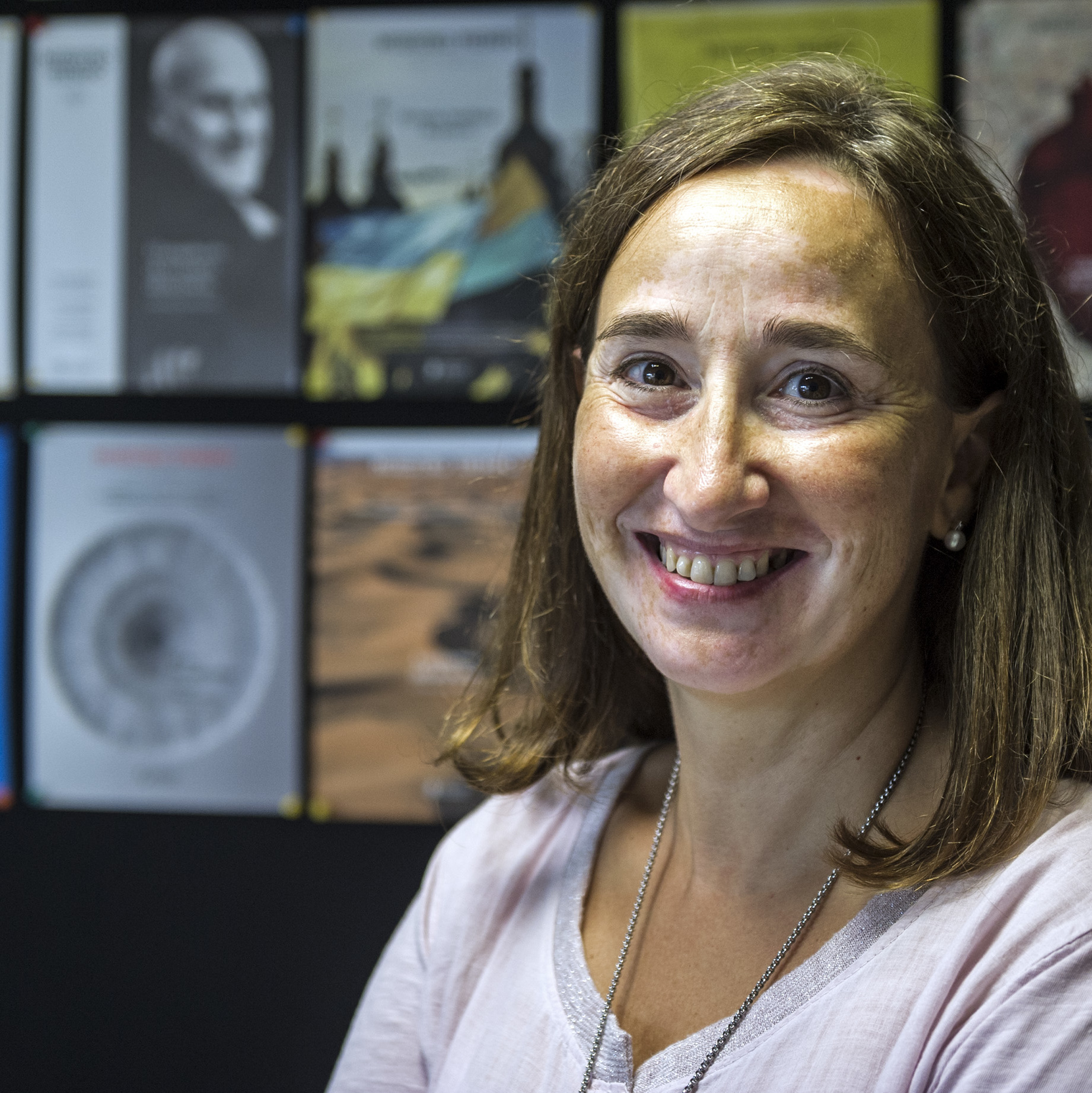
- Chalezquer in 2017
- Born: 1972 (age 53–54); Pamplona, Spain
- Education: University of Navarra
- Occupations: Professor and Dean of the Communication faculty
- Employer: University of Navarra

Charo Sádaba Chalezquer (born 1972) is a tenured Spanish university Professor of Advertising at the School of Communication of University of Navarra. Since 2017 she has been the Dean of that faculty. She is an expert in technology communication to adolescents and children.

== Life ==
Sádaba was born in Pamplona in 1972. She obtained her first degree in Journalism and then continued at the University of Navarra to obtain a doctorate in communication. She then did post-doctoral studies at the School of Communication at Boston University.

In 2004 she became Director of the Information department and in 2010 she was promoted to Vice-Dean of post-graduate research. In 2017 Alfonso Sánchez-Tabernero promoted her to replace Professor Mónica Herrero. She became the Dean of the Faculty of Communications at the University of Navarra.

She is identified as an expert in technology communication to adolescents and children, she is noted for her view that although children do use mobile phones a lot this should not be the most important parental concern. Spanish national newspapers report worrying statistics about mobile phone use, but Sabada encourages parents to think long term about their children's use of mobile phones. She suggests that parent should decide how technology is going to have a place in the family.

== Selected works ==
- La Generación Interactiva en Iberoamérica (The Interactive Generation in Latin America), 2008
- Redes sociales. Manual de supervivencia para padres {Social networks. Parent Survival Manual}, 2011
- Innovación y desarrollo de los cibermedios en España (Innovation and development of cybermedia in Spain), 2016

== Awards ==
- Top 100 Women Leaders in the category of thinkers and Expert, for "being a leader in technology research in children and adolescents", awarded by the Platform Women & Cia (2018)
