= Chart (disambiguation) =

A chart is a graphical representation of data.

Chart or CHART may also refer to:

- A specific type of map, for example:
  - Aeronautical chart, a representation of airspace and ground features relevant to aviation
  - Nautical chart, a representation of a maritime area and adjacent coastal regions
- Chart, in computer science, a data structure used by a chart parser to store partial hypothesized results for re-use
- Chart, in geometry or topology, a coordinate chart for a manifold
- CHART (Coordinated Highways Action Response Team), part of the Maryland State Highway Administration
- Chart of accounts, an accounting term
- Medical record, a medical file
- Project CHART, a digital history project in Brooklyn, New York

== Music ==
- Record chart, for music popularity rankings
- Chart Records, a record label
- Chord chart, a form of sheet music
- Chart (magazine), a Canadian music publication (formally Chart Attack)

== See also ==
- Charl (name)
- Charles (disambiguation)
- Charo (disambiguation)
- Charter
- Charting (disambiguation)
- Chartres
