= Romanization of Cyrillic =

Romanization of Cyrillic is the process of converting text written in the Cyrillic script into the Latin script (also known as the Roman alphabet), or the name of a system used to perform such a conversion.

Methods of script conversion are generally classified into transliteration and transcription. Transliteration represents text on a letter-by-letter basis, preserving the original spelling as closely as possible, whereas transcription represents the pronunciation of speech sounds, either phonemically or phonetically. In practice, many romanization systems combine features of both approaches.

== Transliteration systems ==
- ISO 9
- Romanization of Belarusian
- Romanization of Bulgarian
- Romanization of Kyrgyz
- Romanization of Macedonian
- Romanization of Tajik
- Romanization of Russian
- Romanization of Serbian
- Romanization of Ukrainian
- Scientific transliteration of Cyrillic

== Transcription systems ==
- International Phonetic Alphabet

== See also ==
- Romanization of Greek
