= Virgelina Chará =

Colombian human rights activist (born 1955)

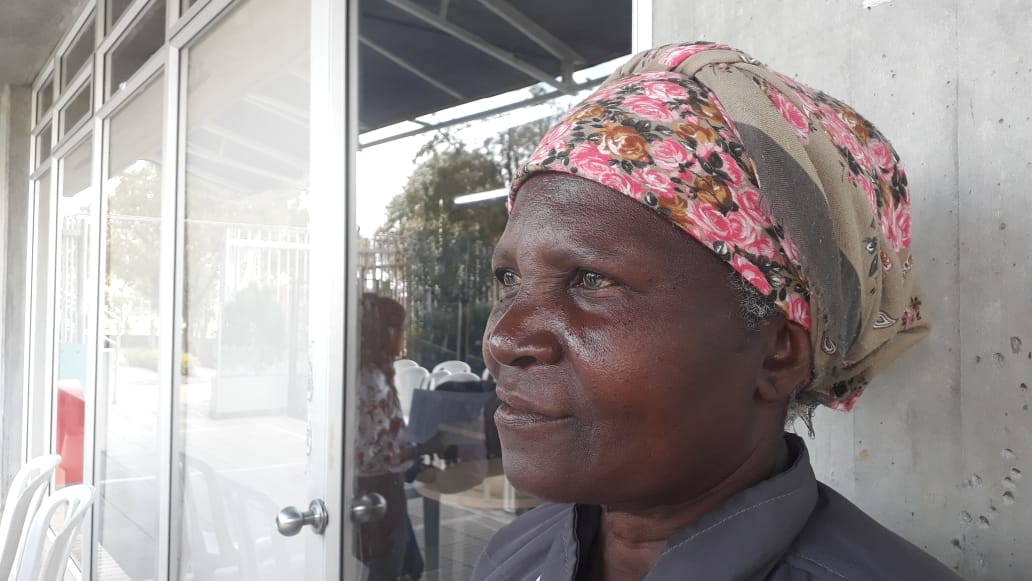
- Born: 19 March 1955 (age 71); Suárez, Valle del Cauca, Colombia
- Occupations: Human rights activist and seamstress

Virgelina Chará (born 19 March 1955) is a Colombian human rights activist and seamstress.

== Biography ==
Chará was born on 19 March 1955 in Suárez in the Valle del Cauca, Colombia. She was the eldest of four children born into an Afro-Colombian family. From the ages of 12 to 18 she worked as a maid in Calí to support her family, then attended school in the evenings and graduated at age 24. After returning to Cauca, she worked supporting miners and peasants who were forced to sell their land for development projects.

During the Colombian conflict, in 1985, Chará was forcibly displaced from Suárez by armed men, along with 6,650 residents from black communities in the local area. The communities were displaced to facilitate the construction of the Salvajina Dam. Her children were also recruited by paramilitary groups. Chará fled to the District of Aguablanca [es].

Between 2003 and 2013, Chará supported women and displaced families through the Association for Women and Work (Spanish: Asociación para la Mujer y el Trabajo, founded in 1994 in Cali). In 2005, Chará moved to Bogotá, where she also worked as a legal adviser to the Cooperativa Multiactiva Interétnica Nuevo Horizonte Limitada, a cooperative focusing on human rights and the supporting victims of displacement.

Chará is a member of the Union of Seamstresses, based at the House of Peace in Bogotá. Alongside a group of fellow seamstresses, she weaved a cloth embroidered with the stories of Colombian people who died during the war, including marginalised individuals, such as people from the LBGTQ+ community and who lived on the streets. It was large enough to cover the entire Plaza de Bolívar square in Bogotá and was produced with the support of the Center for Memory, Peace and Reconciliation (Spanish: Centro de Memoria Paz y Reconciliación, CMPR). The piece has been displayed as an act of memory and as a tribute to the victims of the conflict.

In 2017, Chará was one of three women featured in the documentary film Por Que Cantan Las Aves (2017), produced by Alejandra Quintana and Adrián Villa.

== Awards ==
In 2005, Chará was named a Nobel Peace Prize 1000 PeaceWomen Across the Globe (PWAG).
