= Charla Wise =

American aerospace executive

Charla Kamm Wise is an American aerospace executive who became vice president of engineering at Lockheed Martin Aeronautics and served as president of the American Society of Mechanical Engineers.

== Education and early career ==
Wise graduated from the University of Michigan in 1975, with a degree in aeronautical and aerospace engineering.

She began working for General Dynamics on the F-16 Fighting Falcon program in 1975, rising to program director for production of the F-16 for the United States Air Force in 1985 and director of the F-16 program as a whole in 1987. The General Dynamics' Fort Worth aircraft manufacturing business was sold in 1993 to Lockheed for $1.525B. In 1995, Lockheed Corp. and Martin Marietta merged into Lockheed Martin, absorbing the Fort Worth business into Lockheed Martin Aeronautics.

== Lockheed Martin Aeronautics Co. ==
Meanwhile, in 1994, Wise became program director for the Lockheed Martin F-22 Raptor program and was named vice president of engineering for Lockheed Martin Tactical Aircraft Systems in 1998. From 1998-2003, Wise also led other aircraft programs for Lockheed, such as the F-35 Joint Strike Fighter, C-130J, F-117, and U-2 as vice president. After this period, she took the role of vice president of business operations. All these programs led her to work outside of Fort Worth, like Palmdale and Marietta.

Simultaneously, from 1998 to 2011, Wise assumed membership on the Industry Advisory Board, climbing up through chair, vice chair, and program chair.

== American Society of Mechanical Engineers ==
Wise joined the American Society of Mechanical Engineers in 2006 and served in multiple positions for the society. From 2009 to 2011, she took on a deeper role for the society as vice chair for the Committee of Honors. From 2011 to 2013, she held the position of chair on the Strategic Growth Task Force, and concurrently from 2011 to 2014, she held a membership on the Board of Governors. On June 7th, 2016, she was elected president of the society for a single term, from 2017 to 2018, during the President's Dinner.

== Recognition ==
Wise was the 2002 recipient of the Women In Aerospace Lifetime Achievement Award, the 2006 recipient of the ASME Henry Laurence Gantt Medal, the 2012 recipient of the ASME Dedicated Service Award, and the 2016 recipient of the Society of Women Engineers Upward Mobility Award. She was named as an ASME Fellow in 2022, and is also a fellow of SAE International.
