= Chapa frog (disambiguation) =

The chapa frog is a frog found in Laos, Vietnam, and Thailand.

Chapa frog may also refer to:

- Chapa bubble-nest frog, a frog found in China, Vietnam, and Thailand
- Chapa torrent frog, a frog found in China, Vietnam, and possibly Laos
