= Challa (surname) =

Challa (Telugu: చల్ల) is a Telugu surname. Notable people with the surname include:

- Challa Kondaiah (1918–2001), Indian judge
- Challa Sreenivasulu Setty (born 1965), Indian banker
- Challa Vamshi Chand Reddy, Indian politician
- Challa Venkatrami Reddy (born 1970), Indian politician
