= Chail, Uttar Pradesh =

Chail, Uttar Pradesh Pargana Chail
- County
- Nicknames: Chhail, Chayell
- Location in Uttar Pradesh, India Chail, Uttar Pradesh (India)
- Coordinates: 25.43°N 81.63°E
- Country: India
- State: Awadh
- District: Kaushambi
- Founder: Hina Rawat, Karnal
- Named for: Minal

Government
  - Type: Nagar Panchayat
  - Body: Chail Nagar Panchayat
- Elevation: 82 m (269 ft)

Population (2001)
  - Total: 7,726

Languages
  - Official: Hindi
- Time zone: UTC+5:30 (IST)
- Vehicle registration: UP
- Website: up.gov.in

Chail is a town and a nagar panchayat in Kaushambi district in the state of Uttar Pradesh, India. Formally it was a Pargana, consisting of more than 450 villages and a part of District Allahabad.Chail is also known for its specific community or group of people known as chaaylis who are also known as milki jats. Nearest Market - Manauri bazar.

== Demographics ==
As of the 2011 Census of India, Chail had a population of 7,726. Males constitute 53% of the population and females 47%. Chail has an average literacy rate of 41%, lower than the national average of 59.5%; with male literacy of 51% and female literacy of 30%. 19% of the population is under 6 years of age.
