= Char Pouaka =

New Zealand softball player

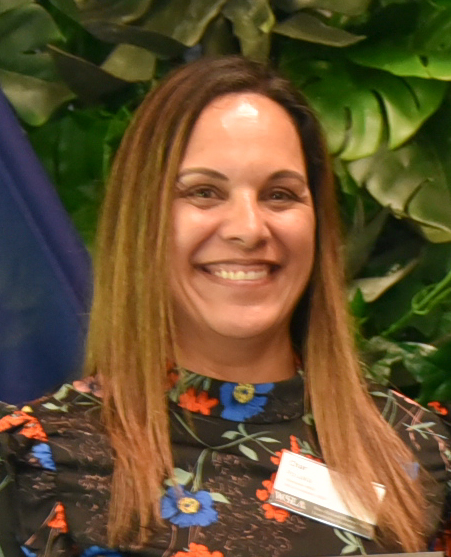
- Pouaka in 2020

Personal information
- Born: 7 July 1973 (age 52) Christchurch, New Zealand

Sport
- Country: New Zealand
- Sport: Softball

Char Pouaka (born 7 July 1973) is a New Zealand softball player. She competed at the 2000 Summer Olympics in Sydney, where the New Zealand team placed sixth in the women's softball tournament. Pouaka also played for the national team in multiple world championships.
