= Charr (clan) =

Clan of the Gurjars of India and Pakistan

Charr, (or Charrh, Char) is a sub-clan of Gurjar ethnic group of India, Pakistan and Afghanistan.

In eastern Gujarat and Rajasthan, Charr are also one of the sub-clans of the Laur subgroup of the Hindu Gurjars.

== Geographical distribution ==
They are inhabitants of Punjab, Khyber Pakhtunkhwa, Azad Kashmir, Gilgit-Baltistan, Balochistan and Islamabad areas of Pakistan. They are also located in Rajasthan, Gujarat, Haryana, Himachal Pradesh, Uttarakhand, Punjab, India, Uttar Pradesh, Madhya Pradesh, Dehli and Jammu and Kashmir regions of north India.
