= Brazilian ship Ceará =

Ceará has been the name of three ships of the Brazilian Navy:

- Brazilian monitor Ceará, a monitor commissioned in 1868 and scrapped in 1884.
- Brazilian submarine support ship Ceará, a multipurpose ship in commission from 1917 to 1946 that functioned as a submarine tender, submarine rescue ship, salvage ship, floating drydock, and floating submarine pressure hull testing facility.
- Ceará (G30), a Thomaston-class dock landing ship in commission from 1989 to 2016 which previously served in the United States Navy as USS Hermitage (LSD-34).
