= Charla Sedacca =

American bodybuilder

Charla Sedacca (born Charla Lineman, January 18, 1960 in Western Pennsylvania) was a female bodybuilder from the United States in the late 1980s. Her older sister Janice Graser also competed in bodybuilding during the same period. The sisters made history in 1987 when both won their classes at the NPC Nationals, with Charla winning the lightweight class and Janice the heavyweight. Charla defeated Janice and middleweight class winner Renee Casella for the overall title. The victory earned Charla her pro card, but she only competed in one professional contest before retiring from competition. She is best remembered for her incredibly peaked biceps (nearly 15" at only 5'1½" and a contest weight of around 114 lbs.). She is now a pharmaceutical sales representative in Texas.

== Contest history ==
- 1986 NPC USA Championship - 2nd (MW)
- 1986 NPC Nationals - 3rd (LW)
- 1987 NPC USA Championship - 1st (MW)
- 1987 NPC Nationals - 1st (LW and overall)
- 1988 Pro World Championship - 16th
