= Khmara (surname) =

Khmara (Cyrillic: Хмара) is a gender-neutral Ukrainian surname. Notable people with this surname include:

- Mykhailo Drai-Khmara (1889–1939), Ukrainian poet and literary scientist (real surname - Drai)
- Edward Khmara (born 1944), American screenwriter
- Evgeny Khmara (born 1988), Ukrainian musician
- Evhenii Khmara (general), Ukrainian security officer
- Ihor Khmara (born 1990), Ukrainian rower
- Stepan Khmara (1937–2024), Ukrainian politician

== See also ==
- Chmara (surname), alternative/Polish spelling
