= Herbert Chard =

English cricketer

Personal information
- Full name: Herbert William Chard
- Born: 17 October 1869; Westbury, Bristol, England
- Died: 9 January 1932 (aged 62); Cotham, Bristol, England
- Batting: Right-handed
- Bowling: Right-arm medium

Domestic team information
- Years: Team
- 1889: Gloucestershire

Career statistics
Competition	First-class
Matches	2
Runs scored	35
Batting average	8.75
100s/50s	–/–
Top score	32
Balls bowled	420
Wickets	3
Bowling average	45.33
5 wickets in innings	–
10 wickets in match	–
Best bowling	2/27
Catches/stumpings	3/–
- Source: Cricinfo, 5 September 2012

Herbert William Chard (17 October 1869 – 9 January 1932) was an English cricketer. Chard was a right-handed batsman who bowled right-arm medium pace. He was born at Westbury, Bristol.

Chard made two first-class appearances for Gloucestershire in 1889 against Surrey at The Oval and Sussex at the County Ground, Hove. He scored 35 runs at an average of 8.75, with a high score of 32, while with the ball he took 3 wickets at a bowling average of 45.33, with best figures of 2/27.

He died at Cotham, Bristol, on 9 January 1932.
