= Charo Urbano =

Spanish actress, theatre director, and author (born 1971)

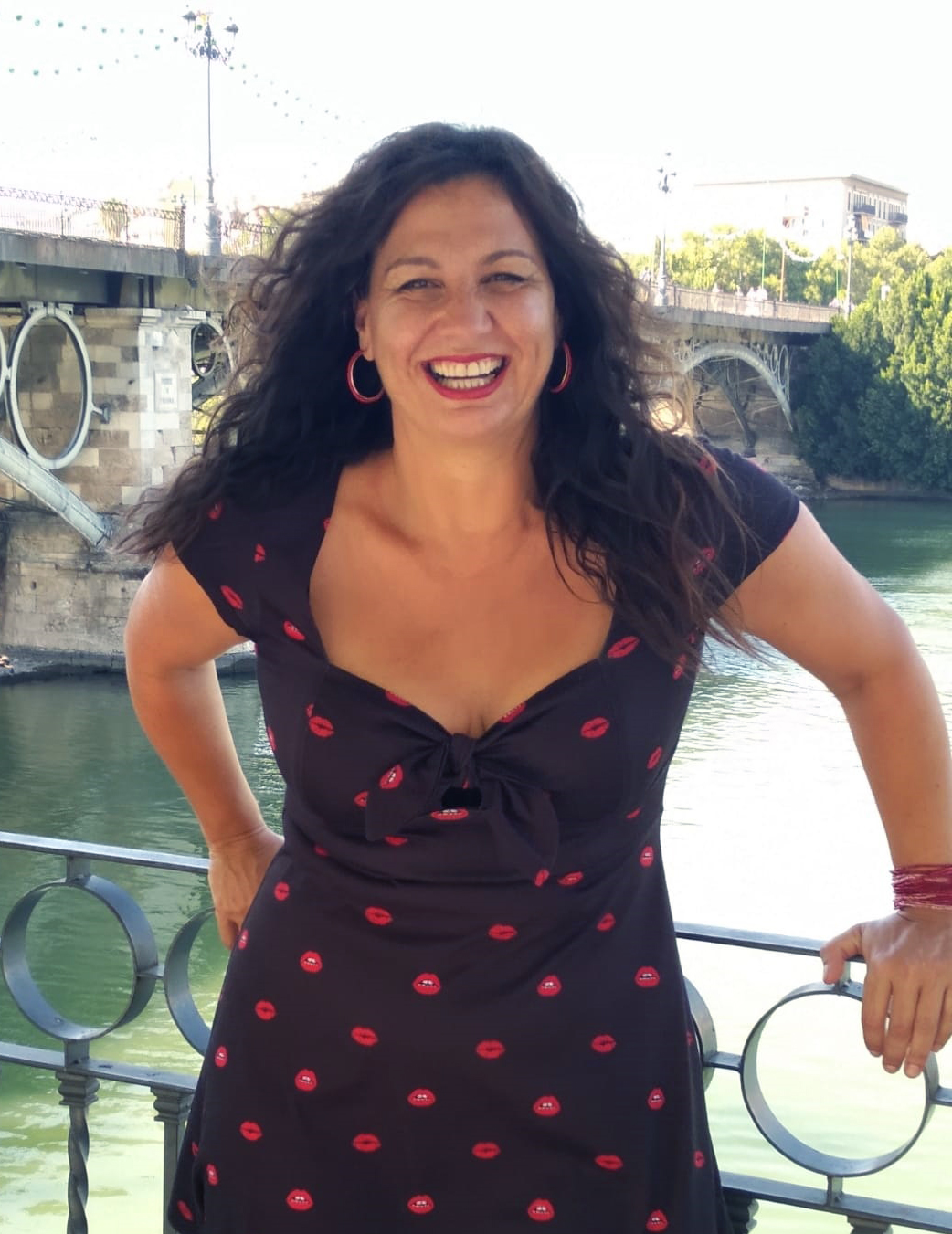
- Born: María del Rosario Urbano Sánchez; November 30, 1971 (age 54); Seville, Andalusia, Spain
- Other names: Txarini Urbano
- Occupations: Actress, theatre director, author
- Years active: 1999–present
- Website: txarinioficial

María del Rosario Urbano Sánchez (born 30 November 1971), better known as Charo Urbano and also known as Txarini Urbano, is a Spanish actress, theatre director, and author from Seville. She has over 25 years of experience in the entertainment industry and audiovisual media. Urbano gained prominence through her theatrical performances and viral social media videos that have garnered millions of views since 2016.

== Biography ==
Charo Urbano was born in Seville, in the historic Triana neighborhood, where she spent her childhood and adolescence surrounded by art and humor. She studied acting, dubbing, singing, and dance, and also pursued studies in production, television direction, and actor-camera techniques with renowned professionals including Mari Paz Sayago, Gregor Acuña, Paco Tous, Julio Fraga, and Benito Zambrano.

In 2019, she was named Trianera of the Year at the Velá de Santiago y Santa Ana festival in Triana.

After more than 25 years in the entertainment industry, Urbano has earned public affection through successful theatrical works. In 2020, during the COVID-19 pandemic, she founded her own theatre company and premiered her first solo theatrical work, "Esto NO es lo que era..." (This is NOT what it was…), directed by Mané Solano.

== Career ==
=== Theatre ===
Urbano began her theatrical career in 2001 with "Tres sombreros de copa" (Three Top Hats) with Cía. La Luciérnaga. From 2004 to 2020, she performed in "Estrella Sublime" with Cía. Bastarda Española. She has also worked as a director and playwright, notably directing "Historia de Mujeres sin Historia" (History of Women without History) for the Seville City Council and the Andalusian Regional Government in 2006.

In 2020, she established her own theatre company, Cía. Charo Urbano, and premiered "Esto NO es lo que era..." During the pandemic, this work provided entertainment during the difficult lockdown period. In 2022, she debuted her second production, "Libertá", which won awards for Best Show and Best Original Playwriting at the I Zentradas Awards for Scenic Arts of Andalusia, and Best Small/Medium Format Show at the X Lorca Awards of the Academy of Scenic Arts of Andalusia.

In 2024, she premiered "Al Relente" (In the Open Air), a comedy that reflects the idiosyncrasies of Seville from the perspective of the city's emblem, the Giraldillo, earning a nomination for Best Performer at the II Zentradas Awards for Scenic Arts of Andalusia.

=== Television and film ===
Urbano has appeared in several Spanish television series, including "Cuéntame cómo pasó" (2019), "Grasa" (2020–2021), "La que se avecina" (2020), "La Templanza" (2020), "La Chica Invisible" (2023), and "En Fin" (2024). She has also appeared in short films and feature films, including "¡Primaria!" (2010) and "Mi Gran Despedida" (2020).

=== Social media presence ===
Since 2016, Urbano has published humorous videos on social media about everyday life under the persona "Txarini Urbano". Her content includes commentary on current events and cooking videos with humorous touches in a section called "Cómetelo Tó" (Eat It All).

She gained viral fame with the video "La Cafetera" (The Coffee Maker) uploaded in 2016, which led to interviews in newspapers and television appearances. The video "Cruzcampo o muerte" (Cruzcampo or Death) helped her gain television visibility. One of her most popular videos, "Primer día de colegio" (First Day of School), achieved thousands of views and widespread recognition.

Urbano has been interviewed on radio programs for Cadena SER, COPE, and Onda Cero, and on television programs such as "Liarla Pardo" on La Sexta and "Late Motiv" on Movistar #0.

== Filmography ==
=== Film ===
Year	Title	Role	Notes
1999	Contigo / Toneladas de Chocolate	Humorist and monologist	Short film
2009	Canto del Kuco	Mother	Short film
2010	¡Primaria!	Mother of Child	Feature film
2020	Mi Gran Despedida	Candelaria	Feature film
2024	Una perra andaluza		Feature film

=== Television ===
Year	Title	Role	Episodes	Network
2017	Gente Maravillosa	Collaborator, humorist	—	RTVA
2019	Cuéntame cómo pasó	Train passenger	1	RTVE
2020	Grasa	Neighbor	1	RTVE
2020	La que se avecina	Elvira	1	Amazon Prime & Telecinco
2020	La Templanza	Lady	1	Amazon Prime
2021	Grasa	Charo	4	RTVE
2023	La Chica Invisible	Candelaria	1	Disney+
2024	En Fin	Melania	1	Amazon Prime

== Theatre ==
Year	Production	Company	Role
2001	Tres sombreros de copa	Cía. La Luciérnaga	Actress
2004–2020	Estrella Sublime	Cía. Bastarda Española	Actress
2006	Historia de Mujeres sin Historia	Seville City Council & Andalusian Regional Government	Director and playwright
2006	Las Tres Mil Viviendas	Teatro Infantil Colegio Andalucía	Director
2008	Teatro para mujeres recluidas en prisión Sevilla 2	—	Director
2009	El Enemigo del Pueblo	Centro Nacional de Teatro	Actress
2010	La Mirada	Centro de Estudios Escénicos de Andalucía	Director and playwright
2011–2019	La Comitiva	Cía. Barruntera Teatro	Director and playwright
2017–2019	12 Escenas / Terapia de Shock	Cía. Arte Infusa	Director, playwright and actress
2017–2020	En Sevilla Hay Que Morir	Cía. La PavaTeatro	Director and actress
2018–2019	Flamenco fusión con el grupo 'Trafalgando'	—	Singer
2020–present	Esto NO es lo que era…	Cía. Charo Urbano	Actress, props and production
2021	Humor & Roll	Cía. Charo Urbano	Singer and humorist
2022	Sombra y Raya	Cía. Charo Urbano	Singer and actress
2022–present	Libertá	Cía. Charo Urbano	Actress, playwright and set designer
2024–present	Al Relente	Cía. Charo Urbano	Actress, playwright, props and production

== Awards and nominations ==
Year	Award	Category	Work	Result
Velá de Santiago y Santa Ana – Triana
2019	Velá de Santiago y Santa Ana	Trianera of the Year		Won
Seville Theater Awards
2018	Seville Theater Awards	Revelation Award	En Sevilla Hay Que Morir	Won
2018	Seville Theater Awards	Best Actress	En Sevilla Hay Que Morir	Nominated
2023	Seville Theater Awards	Best Direction	Libertá	Nominated
2023	Seville Theater Awards	Best Set Design	Libertá	Nominated
Lorca Awards of the Academy of Scenic Arts of Andalusia
2024	X Lorca Awards	Best Small/Medium Format Show	Libertá	Won
2024	X Lorca Awards	Best Theatrical Authorship	Libertá	Nominated
2024	X Lorca Awards	Best Female Performer	Libertá	Nominated
2024	X Lorca Awards	Best Set Design	Libertá	Nominated
Zentradas Awards for Scenic Arts of Andalusia
2024	I Zentradas Awards	Best Show	Libertá	Won
2024	I Zentradas Awards	Best Original Playwriting	Libertá	Won
2024	I Zentradas Awards	Best Performance	Libertá	Nominated
2024	I Zentradas Awards	Best Direction	Libertá	Nominated
2025	II Zentradas Awards	Best Performance	Al Relente	Nominated
