= Sakellari Peninsula =

Peninsula in Antarctica

Coordinates: 67°4′S 49°2′E

Sakellari Peninsula is a large ice-covered peninsula between Amundsen Bay and Casey Bay in Enderby Land, Antarctica. This region was photographed by Australian National Antarctic Research Expeditions (ANARE) in 1956-57 and by the Soviet expedition in the Lena in 1957. Named by the Soviet expedition for Nikolai Sakellari, Soviet scientist and navigator.

Cape Streten is an ice cape at the northeast tip of the Sakellari Peninsula, forming the west side of the entrance to Amundsen Bay.
