= Journal of Computer Assisted Tomography =

Bimonthly peer-reviewed journal

- Discipline: Medical imaging
- Language: English
- Edited by: Eric P. Tamm, MD

Publication details
- History: 1977–present
- Publisher: Wolters Kluwer Health
- Frequency: Bimonthly
- Impact factor: 1.826 (2020)

Standard abbreviations
- ISO 4: J. Comput. Assist. Tomogr.

Indexing
- CODEN: JCATD5
- ISSN: 0363-8715 (print); 1532-3145 (web)
- LCCN: 77641852
- OCLC no.: 231040304

Links
- Journal homepage; Online access; Online archive

The Journal of Computer Assisted Tomography, abbreviated JCAT, is a bimonthly peer-reviewed medical journal covering medical imaging, with a particular focus on CT scans and magnetic resonance imaging. It was established in 1977 and is published by Wolters Kluwer Health. It is the official journal of SABI, the Society for Advanced Body Imaging.

The editor-in-chief is Eric P. Tamm, MD (University of Texas and MD Anderson Cancer Center). According to the Journal Citation Reports, the journal has a 2020 impact factor of 1.826.

The journal's title has often been mistakenly represented (in mentions and citations) as "Journal of Computed Assisted Tomography".
