= Chhalia (1973 film) =

- Promotional poster
- Directed by: Mukul Dutt
- Produced by: Sudesh Gupta
- Starring: Navin Nischol; Nanda; Shatrughan Sinha
- Cinematography: KK Mahajan
- Music by: R. D. Burman
- Release date: 16 May 1973
- Running time: 110 minutes
- Language: Hindi

Chhalia is a 1973 Hindi-language Indian feature film directed by Mukul Dutt and starring Navin Nischol, Nanda, Shatrughan Sinha, Rajendra Nath and Helen. The film was amongst the last films of actress Nanda in lead roles in 1970s when she had reduced her work after starring in several film from 1950s.

== Music ==
1. "Pyaar Bechti Hoon" - Asha Bhosle
2. "Aa Mere Saathi Aa" - Lata Mangeshkar
3. "O Jaaneman" - Asha Bhosle, Kishore Kumar
4. "Pyaar To Hai Ek Baazi" - Asha Bhosle
5. "Zindagi Men Aap Aaye" - Vani Jairam, Mukesh
6. "A Janewafa Aisa Bhi Kaya" - Mohammed Rafi

== Cast ==
- Navin Nischol
- Nanda
- Shatrughan Sinha
- Rajendra Nath
- Asrani
- Helen
- Bhagwan Dada
