= Chari (surname) =

Chari/Achari/Achar/Acharya is a Hindu surname found in the Vishwakarma Brahmin caste that encompasses various communities across India, with regional modifications consistent with the local languages.

== Notable people ==
- Ahalya Chari (1921–2013), Indian educationist
- Brian Chari (born 1992), Zimbabwean cricketer
- C. T. K. Chari (1909–1993), Indian philosopher
- Deepa Chari, Indian actress and swimsuit model
- Nyasha Chari (born 1980), Zimbabwean cricketer
- Raja Chari (born 1977), Indian-American astronaut
- Seshadri Chari, Indian journalist, politician and foreign policy analyst
- V. V. Chari (born 1950s), Indian-born economist
- Vyjayanthi Chari, Indian–American Mathematician
