= Chad (name) =

- Gender: Male

Origin
- Origin: Derived from Old English given name Ceadda
- Meaning: "Protector" or "Defender"

Other names
- Related names: Chadd, Chadwick, Charles

The name Chad is the modernized form of the Old English given name Ceadda, derived from a 7th century saint who was Archbishop of York. It is also a short form of Charles, Chandler, Chadler, Chadd, Chadrick and Chadwick.

Until the 20th century, Chad was very rarely used as a given name. According to the Social Security Administration, Chad first entered the top 1000 names for male children in the United States in 1945, when it was the 997th most popular name. Its popularity suddenly peaked beginning in the mid-1960s, reaching rank 25 in 1972 and 1973. From the mid-1970s, its popularity began a gradual decline, reaching rank 236 in 2000 and rank 667 as of 2013.

== Given name ==
- Chad of Mercia (died 672), Anglo-Saxon bishop
- Chad Allan (musician) (1943–2023), Canadian musician and founding member of The Guess Who
- Chad Allegra (born 1980), American professional wrestler
- Chad Allen (actor) (born 1974), American actor
- Chad Allen (baseball) (born 1975), American baseball player
- Chad Ashton (born 1967), American soccer player
- Chad Aull (born 1982), American politician
- Chad Beebe (born 1994), American football player
- Chad Behn, American politician
- Chad Bettis (born 1989), American Major League Baseball pitcher
- Chad Bingham, American politician
- Chad Bond (born 1987), Welsh footballer
- Chad Bradford (born 1974), American former Major League Baseball relief pitcher
- Chad Bronstein (born 1987), American businessman
- Chad Brown (disambiguation)
- Chad Butler (1973–2007), American rapper
- Chad Campbell (born 1974), American golfer
- Chad Campbell (politician) (born 1973), American politician
- Chad Cardillo, American politician
- Chad Channing (born 1967), former drummer for Nirvana and member of Fire Ants
- Chad Clifton (born 1976), American football player
- Chad L. Coleman (born 1967), American actor
- Chad Collins (politician), Canadian politician
- Chad Cornes (born 1979), Australian Rules Football player
- Chad Curtis (born 1968), American former Major League Baseball player
- Chad DeGrenier (born 1973), American football player
- Chad E. Donella (born 1978), Canadian actor
- Chad Durbin (born 1977), Philadelphia Phillies relief pitcher
- Chad Everett (1936–2012), American actor
- Chad Frewaldt (born 1970), American racing driver
- Chad Gould (born 1982), Filipino-English footballer
- Chad Gray (born 1971), American lead singer for Mudvayne and Hellyeah
- Chad I. Ginsburg (born 1972), lead guitarist and producer of the rock band CKY
- Chad Greenway (born 1983), American football player
- Chad Hall (born 1986), American football player
- Chad Hansen (born 1995), American football player
- Chad Henne (born 1985), American football player
- Chad Hugo (born 1974), American record producer
- Chad Hurley (born 1977), American internet businessman and YouTube co-founder
- Chad Jeffries (born 1992), American football player
- Chad Johnson (actor) (born 1960), American actor and model
- Chad Johnson (wide receiver) (born 1978), American football player
- Chad Johnson (ice hockey) (born 1986), Canadian ice hockey goaltender
- Chad Kanoff (born 1994), American football player
- Chad Kellogg (1971–2014), American mountain climber
- Chad Kelly (born 1994), American football player
- Chad Kelsay (born 1977), American football player
- Chad Kessler (born 1975), American football player
- Chad Kilgore (born 1989), American football player
- Chad Kroeger (born 1974), lead singer and guitarist for Nickelback
- Chad le Clos (born 1992), South African world and Olympic champion in swimming
- Chad Levitt (born 1975), American football player
- Chad Lewis (born 1971), American football player
- Chad Lowe (born 1968), American actor and director
- Chad McKnight, American professional basketball player
- Chad McMahan, American politician
- Chad Mendes, American mixed martial arts fighter
- Chad Michael Murray (born 1981), American actor
- Chad Michaels, American drag queen
- Chad Moldenhauer (born 1979), Canadian video game developer and television executive producer.
- Chad Morgan (1933–2025), Australian country music singer
- Chad Muma (born 1999), American football player
- Chad Muska (born 1977), American professional skateboarder
- Chad Norman, Canadian poet
- Chad Owens (born 1982), American football player
- Chad Pennington (born 1976), American football player
- Chad Peralta (born 1985), Filipino-Australian singer and actor
- Chad Person (born 1978), US contemporary artist
- Chad Puryear, American politician
- Chad Randall (born 1980), Harlequins Rugby League player
- Chad Reed (born 1982), Australian motocross racer
- Chad Reichard, American politician
- Chad M. Rienstra (Born 1971), Chemistry Professor at UW-Madison
- Chad Robertson, member of the Alabama House of Representatives
- Chad Robinson (born 1980), Harlequins Rugby League player
- Chad Rook (born 1982/1983), Canadian actor
- Chad Ryland (born 1999), American football player
- Chad Smith (disambiguation)
- Chad Sexton (born 1970), drummer for 311
- Chad Stahelski (born 1968), American stuntman and film director
- Chad Stephens, American politician
- Chad Stuart (1941–2020), one half of the pop duo of Chad & Jeremy
- Chad Thomas (born 1995), American football player
- Chad Taylor (guitarist) (born 1970), American guitarist and backing vocalist in the bands The Gracious Few and Live
- Chad Taylor (writer) (born 1964), New Zealand writer
- Chad Trujillo (born 1973), astronomer
- Chad Urmston (born 1976), lead singer and guitarist for Dispatch and State Radio
- Chad VanGaalen (born 1977), Canadian musician and singer
- Chad Varah (1911–2007), founder of The Samaritans crisis hotline organization
- Chad Vaughn (born 1980), American weightlifter
- Chad Wackerman (born 1960), American drummer
- Chad Westberg, American politician
- Chad Wheeler (born 1994), American football player
- Chad Wicks (born 1978), American professional wrestler
- Chad Williams (wide receiver) (born 1994), American football player
- Chad Willis (born 1979), American businessman
- Chad Wilt (born 1978), American football player and coach

== Surname ==
- Charles Chad (born 1982), Brazilian footballer
- Dominic Chad (born 1972), English rock guitarist
- George William Chad (1781 or 1784–1849), English diplomat
- Harrison Chad (born 1992), American actor
- Norman Chad (born 1958), American sportswriter and syndicated columnist

== Fictional characters ==
- Chad (Saturday Night Live), played by Pete Davidson
- Chad Dylan Cooper, from Sonny with a Chance
- Chad Danforth, from the High School Musical franchise
- Yasutora Sado, nicknamed Chad, from the anime and manga series Bleach

== See also ==
- Chad (disambiguation)
- Chadwick (given name)
- Chads (surname)
- Chal (name)
- Char (name)
- Chad (slang)
