= Chadd =

Chadd is a name. Notable people with the name include:

Surname:

- Billy Lee Chadd (born 1954), American serial killer
- Carl Chadd, British puppeteer
- John Chadd (born 1933), Australian cricketer
- Lance Chadd (a.k.a. Tjyllyungoo; born 1954), Noongar painter
- Richard Chadd (died 2021), British ecologist and biologist

Given name:

- Chadd Cassidy (born 1973), American ice hockey coach
- Chadd Collins (born 1995), Australian Muay Thai fighter and kickboxer
- Chadd Harbold, American filmmaker
- Chadd Ning (born 2006), Liswati swimmer
- Chadd Sayers (born 1987), Australian cricketer

Organization:

- Children and Adults with Attention-Deficit/Hyperactivity Disorder (CHADD)

== See also ==
- Chad (disambiguation)
  - Chad (name)
