= Chadwick =

Chadwick may refer to:

== People ==
- Chadwick (surname)
- Chadwick (given name)

== Places ==
- Chadwick, Illinois, United States, a village
- Chadwick, Michigan, United States, a former community
- Chadwick, Missouri, United States, an unincorporated community
- Chadwick Bay, New York, United States
- Chadwick Lake, New York, United States
- Chadwick, Western Australia, a suburb of the town of Esperance
- Chadwick (crater), a lunar crater

== Other uses ==
- James Chadwick Medal and Prize, a biennial award presented by the Institute of Physics for particle physics research
- Chadwick Arboretum, Columbus, Ohio
- The Chadwick, an apartment building in Indianapolis, Indiana, formerly on the National Register of Historic Places
- Chadwick School, a private K-12 school in Southern California
- Chadwick International, a day school in Songdo International City, South Korea, run by the Chadwick School
- United States v. Chadwick, a 1977 decision of the Supreme Court of the United States regarding Fourth Amendment protections

== See also ==
- Chadwick End, West Midlands
