= Rex Tillerson =

American businessman and diplomat (born 1952)

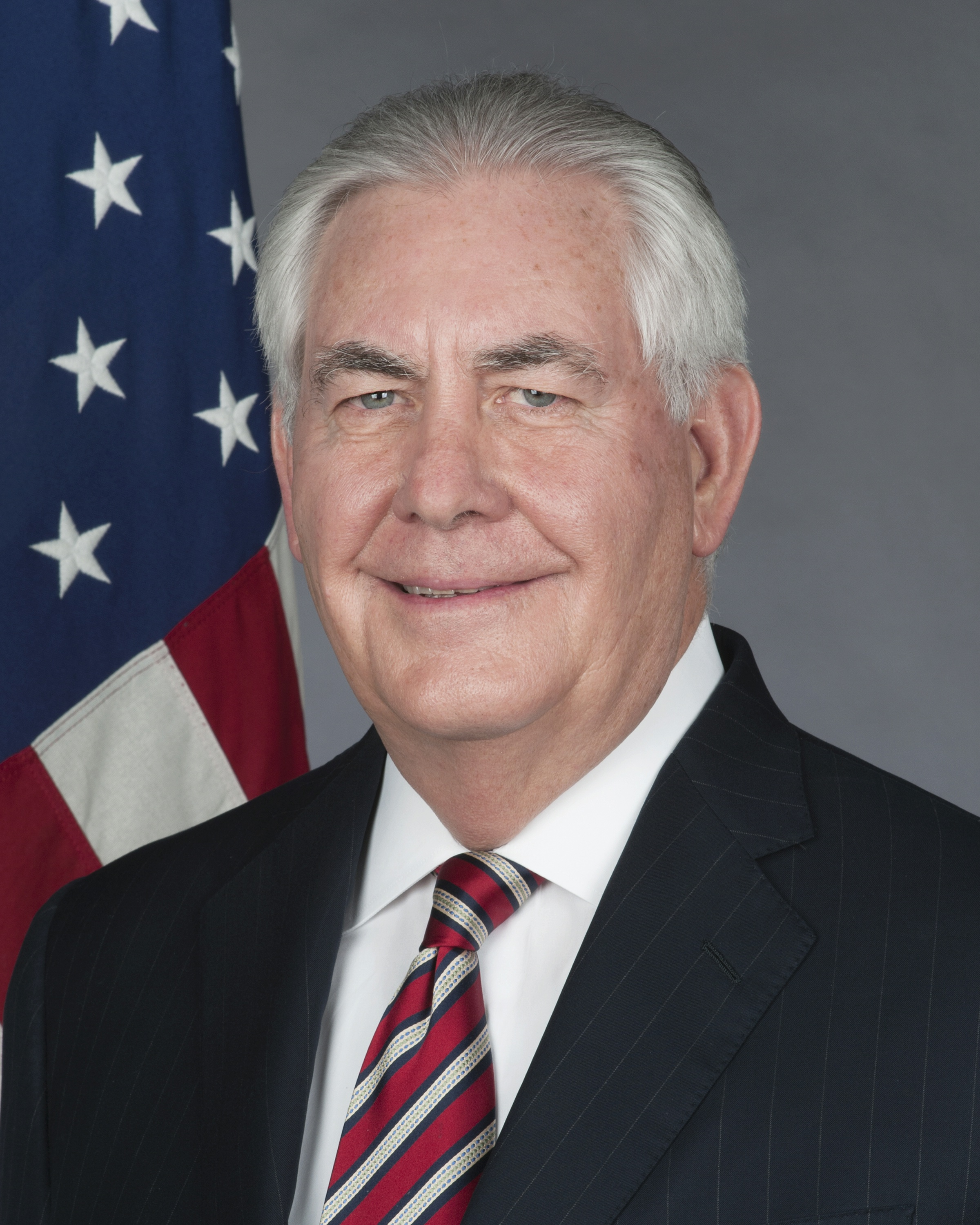
- Official portrait, 2017

69th United States Secretary of State
- In office February 1, 2017 – March 31, 2018
- President: Donald Trump
- Deputy: John Sullivan
- Preceded by: John Kerry
- Succeeded by: Mike Pompeo

23rd President of ExxonMobil
- In office January 1, 2006 – January 1, 2016
- Preceded by: Lee Raymond
- Succeeded by: Darren Woods

16th Chairman of ExxonMobil
- In office January 1, 2006 – January 1, 2017
- Preceded by: Lee Raymond
- Succeeded by: Darren Woods

33rd President of the Boy Scouts of America
- In office May 26, 2010 – May 30, 2012
- Preceded by: John Gottschalk
- Succeeded by: Wayne Perry

Personal details
- Born: Rex Wayne Tillerson; March 23, 1952 (age 74) Wichita Falls, Texas, U.S.
- Party: Republican
- Spouses: Jamie Lee Henry (m. 1974, divorced); Renda St. Clair (m. 1986)
- Children: 3
- Education: University of Texas, Austin (BS)
- Awards: Eagle Scout (1965); Order of Friendship (2013); Dewhurst Award (2017)
- Tillerson's voice Tillerson on blockades against Qatar. Recorded June 9, 2017

Rex Wayne Tillerson (born March 23, 1952) is an American energy executive and former diplomat who served as the 69th United States secretary of state from 2017 to 2018 in the first administration of Donald Trump. From 2006 to 2016, he was chairman and chief executive officer (CEO) of ExxonMobil.

Tillerson began his career as a civil engineer with Exxon in 1975 after graduating with a bachelor's degree in civil engineering from the University of Texas at Austin. By 1989, he had become general manager of the Exxon USA central production division. In 1995, he became president of Exxon Yemen Inc. and Esso Exploration and Production Khorat Inc. In 1998, he became vice president of Exxon Ventures (CIS) and president of Exxon Neftgas Limited. In 2004, he became president of Exxon Mobil Corporation. In 2006, Tillerson was elected chair and chief executive of ExxonMobil, the world's sixth-largest company by revenue. Tillerson retired from ExxonMobil effective January 1, 2017.

Tillerson is a longtime volunteer with the Boy Scouts of America and earned the rank of Eagle Scout. From 2010 to 2012, he was the national president of the Boy Scouts, its highest volunteer position. He is a longtime contributor to Republican campaigns, but did not donate to Donald Trump's presidential campaign. In 2014, Tillerson, who had made business deals on behalf of ExxonMobil with Russia, opposed the sanctions against Russia. He was previously the director of the joint United States-Russia oil company Exxon Neftegas.

Tillerson, an unconventional choice for the role, became secretary of state on February 1, 2017. His tenure was characterized by a lack of visibility in comparison to his predecessors in the traditionally high-profile position. During Tillerson's tenure, new applications to work for the Foreign Service fell by 50 percent, and four of the six career ambassadors as well as 14 of the 33 career ministers, equivalent to military four- and three-star generals, departed. After their relationship deteriorated, Trump dismissed Tillerson in March 2018, and replaced him with CIA director Mike Pompeo.

== Early life ==
Tillerson is the son of Patty Sue (née Patton) and Bobby Joe Tillerson, and named after Rex Allen and John Wayne, two Hollywood actors famous for playing cowboys. He was raised in Vernon, Texas; Stillwater, Oklahoma; and Huntsville, Texas. He has two sisters, Rae Ann Hamilton, a physician who resides in Abilene, Texas, and Jo Lynn Peters, a high school educator. Tillerson's father was an executive of the Boy Scouts of America organization, and this led to his family's move to Huntsville. Tillerson himself has been active in the Boy Scouts for most of his life, and in his youth he earned the rank of Eagle Scout.

At age 14, while living in Stillwater, Oklahoma, he became a busser in the student union building at Oklahoma State University and began picking cotton for work on weekends. In 1968, two years afterward, he became a janitor of one of the university's engineering buildings.

Tillerson graduated from Huntsville High School in 1970. He was leader for the percussion section of his high school band, in which he played the kettle drums and snare drum, and he earned spots in the all-district and all-region bands during his senior year. Tillerson received a college scholarship from the University of Texas Longhorn Band. He received a bachelor of science degree in civil engineering from the University of Texas at Austin in 1975. During his time at UT Austin, he was involved with the Tejas Club (an all-male secret society) and the marching band.

== Business career ==
=== Exxon ===
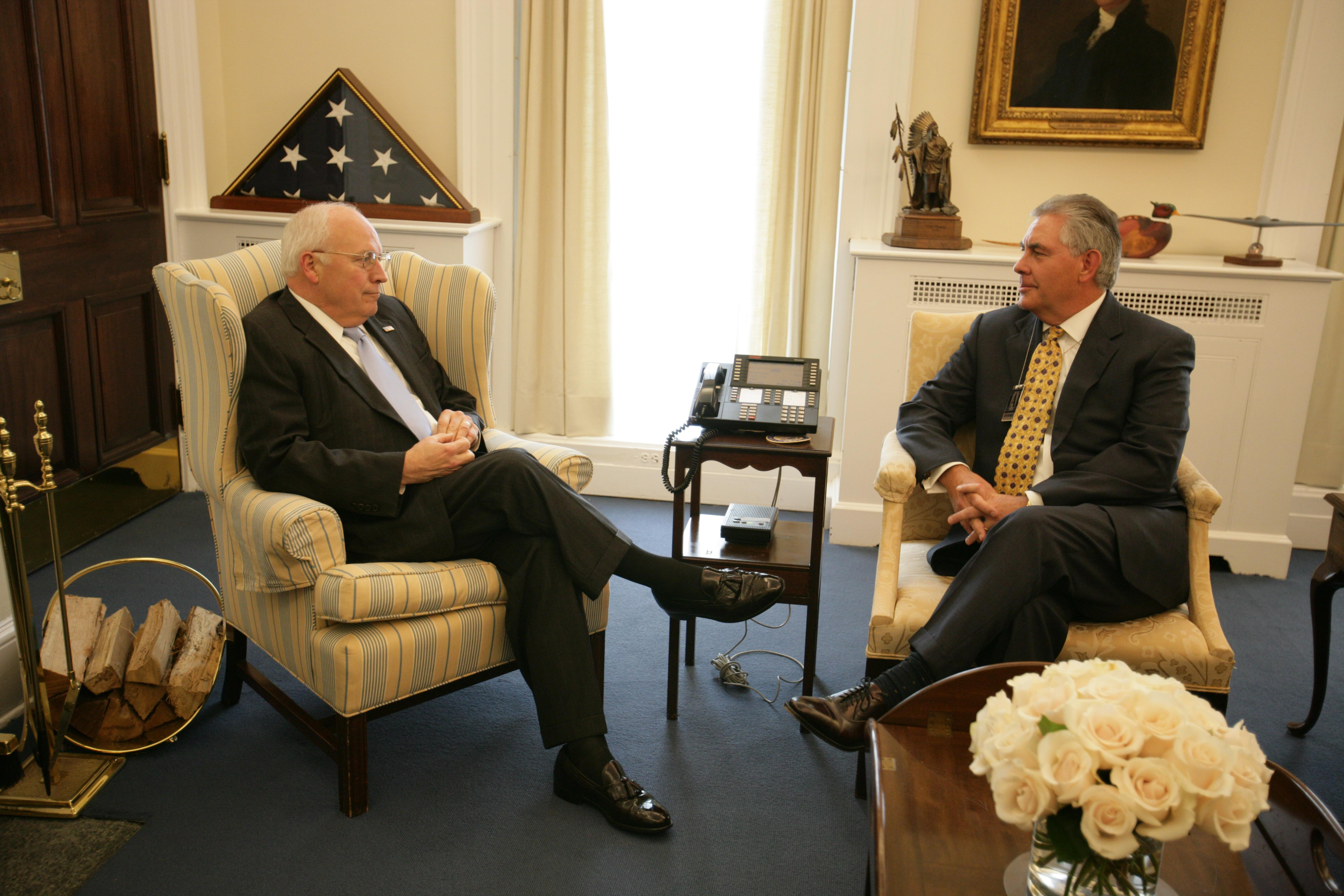
Vice President Dick Cheney and Tillerson, 2007

Tillerson joined Exxon Company USA in 1975 as a production engineer. In 1989, Tillerson became general manager of the central production division of Exxon USA. In 1995, he became president of Exxon Yemen Inc. and Esso Exploration and Production Khorat Inc.

In 1998, he became a vice president of Exxon Ventures (CIS) and president of Exxon Neftegas Limited with responsibility for Exxon's holdings in Russia and the Caspian Sea. He then entered Exxon into the Sakhalin-I consortium with Rosneft.

In 1999, with the merger of Exxon and Mobil, he was named executive vice president of ExxonMobil Development Company. In 2004, he became president and director of ExxonMobil. With this appointment Tillerson's choice as the successor of Lee Raymond as CEO of Exxon Mobil was implied. His major competitor was Ed Galante, another Exxon executive. On January 1, 2006, Tillerson was elected chairman and CEO, following the retirement of Lee Raymond. At the time, ExxonMobil had 80,000 employees, did business in nearly 200 countries, and had an annual revenue of nearly $400 billion.

Under Tillerson's leadership, ExxonMobil worked closely with Saudi Arabia, the world's largest oil exporter and a longtime U.S. ally, as well as Qatar and the United Arab Emirates. From 2003 to 2005, a European subsidiary of ExxonMobil, Infineum, operated in the Middle East providing sales to Iran, Sudan and Syria. ExxonMobil leaders said they followed all legal frameworks, and that such sales were minuscule compared to their annual revenue of $371 billion at the time. In 2009, ExxonMobil acquired XTO Energy, a major natural gas producer, for $31 billion in stock. Michael Corkery of The Wall Street Journal wrote that "Tillerson's legacy rides on the XTO deal." Tillerson approved Exxon negotiating a multibillion-dollar deal with the government of Iraqi Kurdistan, despite opposition from President Barack Obama and Iraqi Prime Minister Nouri al-Maliki, both of whom argued it would increase regional instability.

Tillerson lobbied against Rule 1504 of the Dodd–Frank reform and protections, which would have required Exxon to disclose payments to foreign governments. In 2017, Congress voted to overturn Rule 1504 one hour before Tillerson was confirmed as secretary of state.

On January 4, 2017, The Financial Times reported that Tillerson would cut his ExxonMobil ties if he became secretary of state. Walter Shaub, the director of the United States Office of Government Ethics, said he was proud of the ethics agreement developed for Tillerson, who was now "free of financial conflicts of interest. His ethics agreement serves as a sterling model for what we'd like to see with other nominees."

In September 2023, The Wall Street Journal reviewed previously unreported internal ExxonMobil documents that showed that after the company issued its first press statement acknowledging that burning fossil fuels contributes to climate change in 2006, Tillerson and other company executives sought to diminish public concern about climate change by casting doubt on the severity of climate change impacts.

==== Ties with Russia ====
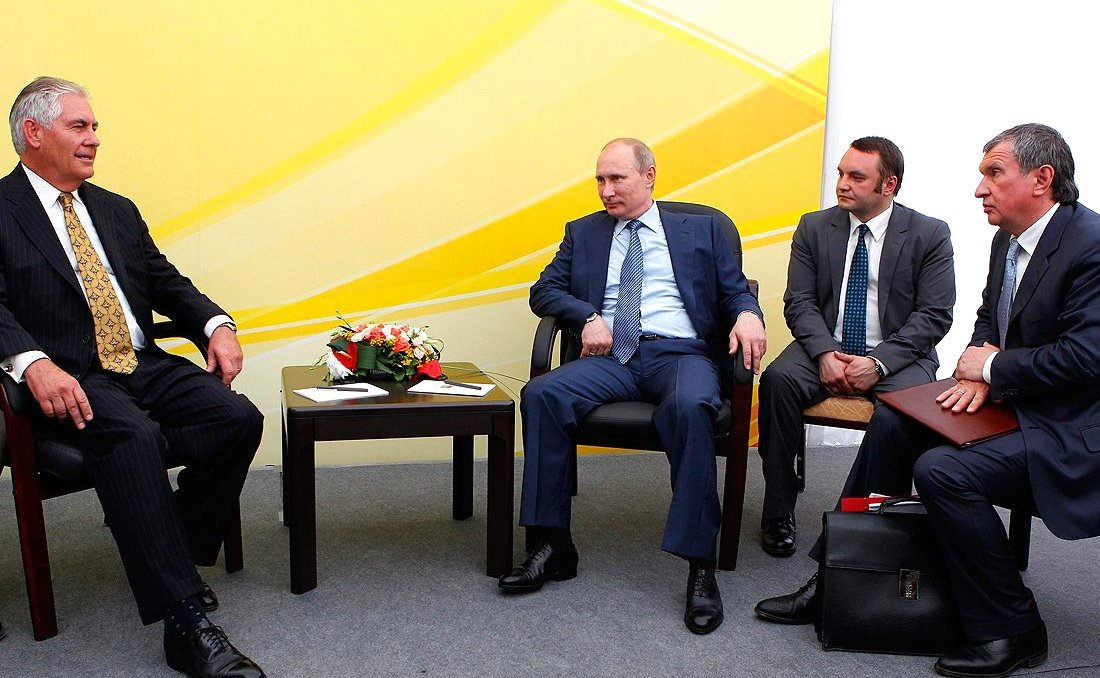
Tillerson with President Vladimir Putin and Igor Sechin, the CEO of state-controlled energy giant Rosneft, in Tuapse, 2012

As the CEO of ExxonMobil, Tillerson had ties with President Vladimir Putin of Russia. They had been associates since Tillerson represented Exxon's interests in Russia, the world's largest producer of crude oil, during Russian president Boris Yeltsin's tenure. Tillerson was responsible for the development of a partnership between Exxon and state-owned oil company Rosneft and the ultimately unsuccessful attempt to acquire a stake in Yukos, owned by Mikhail Khodorkovsky, before the firm was nationalized after Khodorkovsky's arrest. John Hamre, the president and CEO of the Center for Strategic and International Studies, of which Tillerson is a board member, says Tillerson "has had more interactive time with Vladimir Putin than probably any other American, with the exception of Henry Kissinger".

Tillerson was a friend of Igor Sechin, the executive chairman of Rosneft, the Russian state oil company, and leader of the Kremlin's Siloviki (security/military) faction, who has been described as "Russia's second-most powerful person" after Putin. Exxon owns a dacha next door to Sechin's, and Tillerson would often visit it there. Tillerson led Sechin on a tour of New York City, dining on caviar with him and Putin at Per Se restaurant. In 2006, Exxon avoided making any government concessions in its Sakhalin-I oil field after Royal Dutch Shell was forced to sell half of its ownership in Sakhalin-II by the Russian government.

In August 2011, Putin attended a ceremony in Sochi where Tillerson and Sechin signed an agreement between ExxonMobil and Rosneft to drill the East-Prinovozemelsky field in the Arctic Ocean valued at up to $300 billion. The Rosneft deal also gave the state-owned oil company a 30% stake in Exxon owned assets in the U.S. Gulf of Mexico, Canada, and West Texas. The company began drilling in the Kara Sea in the summer of 2014, and a round of sanctions against Russia introduced in September that year due to the Russo-Ukrainian War was to have brought the project to a halt in mid-September. Nevertheless, the company was granted a reprieve that stretched the window to work until October 10, which enabled it to discover a major field with about 750 million barrels of new oil for Russia. In July 2017, the U.S. Treasury's Office of Foreign Assets Control fined ExxonMobil $2 million for violating sanctions in its dealings with Sechin, leading the company to sue the government.

In 2013, Tillerson was awarded the Order of Friendship by Putin for his contribution to developing cooperation in the energy sector.

In June 2017, Tillerson said Trump had asked him to "stabilize the relationship (with Russia) and build trust".

==== Compensation ====
In 2012, Tillerson's compensation package was $40.5 million. It was $28.1 million in 2013, $33.1 million in 2014, and $27.2 million in 2015. In late 2016, Tillerson held $54 million of Exxon stock, and had a right to deferred stock worth approximately $180 million over the next ten years. Tillerson is estimated to be worth at least $300 million. When he left Exxon, Tillerson was four months away from retirement, at which time he would have been entitled to a $180 million retirement package. He owns two ranches in Texas, where his wife, Renda, raises cutting horses.

On January 3, 2017, ExxonMobil announced they had reached an agreement with Tillerson "to sever all ties with the company to comply with conflict-of-interest requirements associated with his nomination as secretary of state".

==== Wayne Tracker alias ====
While CEO of ExxonMobil, Tillerson used an alias email address "Wayne Tracker" for eight years and sent thousands of messages. In response to a subpoena issued from the New York State Attorney General's office (part of a state investigation into whether Exxon had misled investors and the public about climate change), Exxon produced about 60 emails associated with the "Wayne Tracker" account, but did not inform investigators that they were Tillerson's. ExxonMobil said the account was "used for everyday business" needs such as "secure and expedited communications" between Tillerson and top company executives.

Tillerson's use of the alias became publicly known in March 2017, after New York State Attorney General Eric Schneiderman wrote in a letter to a judge that Tillerson had used the "Wayne Tracker" email for at least seven years. Later that month, Exxon revealed that emails from the alias account from September 2014 to September 2015 were missing; a further search recovered some emails, but none between September 5, 2014, and November 28, 2014. An attorney for Exxon said a "unique issue" limited to that account led to emails being automatically deleted.

=== Other affiliations ===
Tillerson is a trustee of the Center for Strategic and International Studies and the American Petroleum Institute. He is also a member of the Business Roundtable. In 2013, he became a member of the National Academy of Engineering. He was a member of the executive committee of The Business Council for 2011 and 2012.

Tillerson is a long-time volunteer with the Boy Scouts of America (BSA), and from 2010 to 2012 was its national president, its highest non-executive position. Tillerson is a Distinguished Eagle Scout, and his father was a BSA executive. Tillerson is a long-time supporter of the BSA and has said, "I think the highlight of my youth and adolescent years were my achievements in Scouting." In 2009, Tillerson was inducted into the Eagle Scout Hall of Fame of the Greater New York Councils. Ray L. Hunt, a close friend and the chairman of Hunt Consolidated, told the Dallas Morning News, "To understand Rex Tillerson, you need to understand Scouting."

After the end of his term as BSA president, he remained on the organization's National Executive Board. There he played a significant role in the board's 2013 decision to rescind the long-standing ban on openly gay youth as members. According to Center for Strategic and International Studies president John Hamre, Tillerson was instrumental in the change and "a key leader in helping the group come to a consensus".

On July 9, 2017, Tillerson received the Dewhurst Award from the World Petroleum Council in recognition for "outstanding contribution to the oil and gas industry" during his 41 years at Exxon Mobil.

== Secretary of State (2017–2018) ==
=== Nomination and confirmation ===
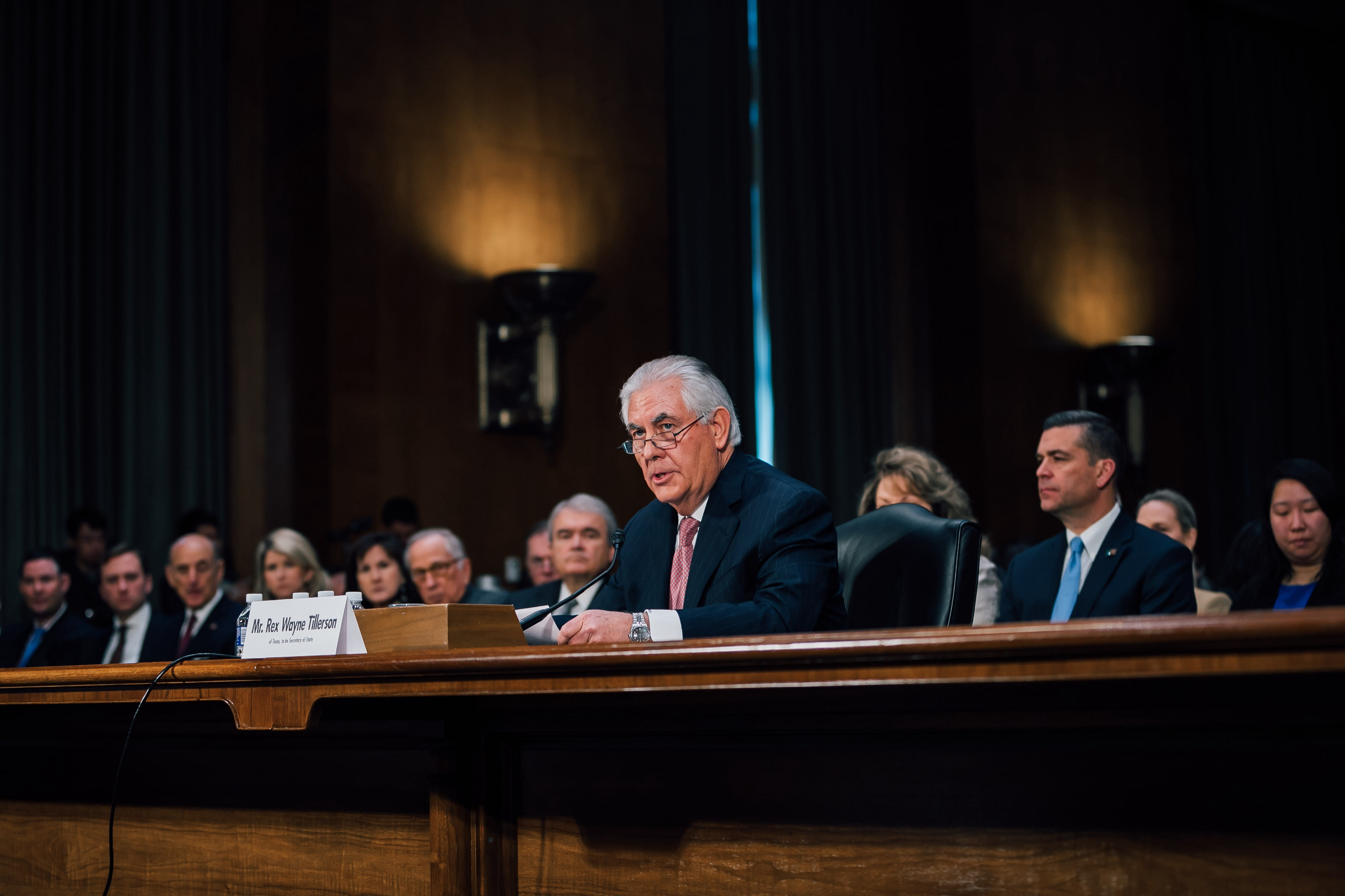
Tillerson at his confirmation hearing on January 11, 2017

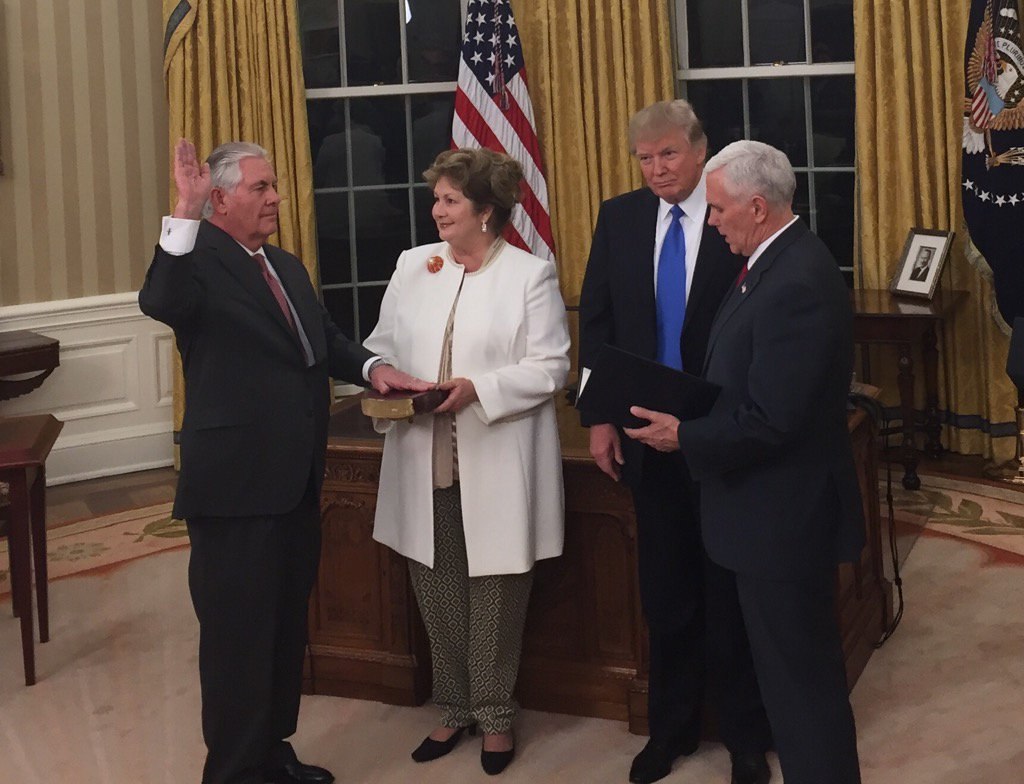
Tillerson being sworn in as Secretary of State on February 1, 2017

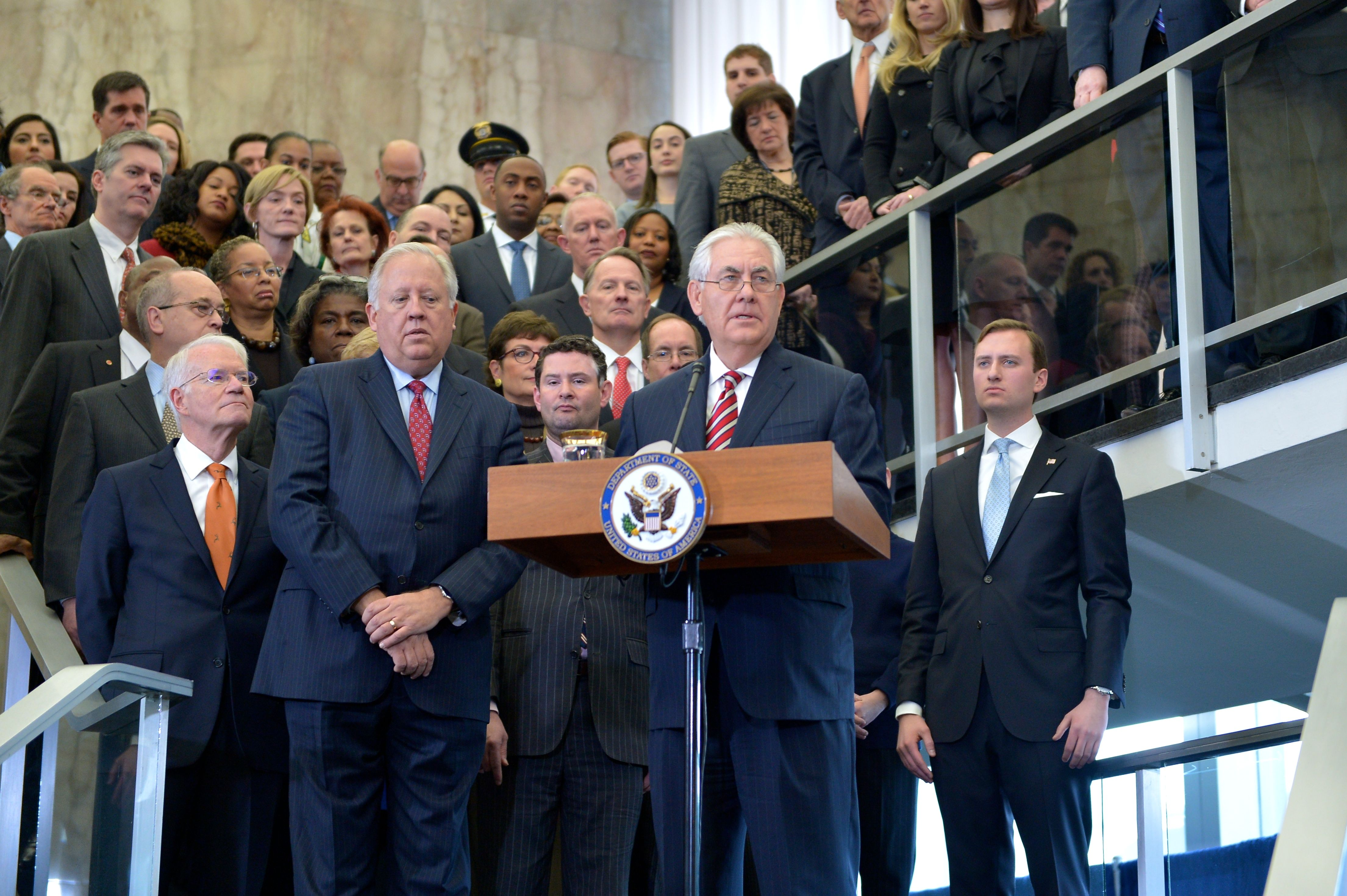
Tillerson delivering welcome remarks at the Department of State on his first official day as Secretary of State

Tillerson was first recommended to president-elect Trump for the secretary of state role by former secretary of state Condoleezza Rice, during her meeting with Trump in late November 2016. Rice's recommendation of Tillerson to Trump was backed up by former secretary of defense Robert Gates, three days later. Media speculation that he was being considered for the position began on December 5, 2016. On December 9, transition officials reported that Tillerson was the top candidate for the position, surpassing contenders such as Mitt Romney and David Petraeus. His nomination was reportedly advocated by Steve Bannon and Jared Kushner.

On January 20, 2017, shortly after being sworn in as president of the United States, Trump formally sent his nomination of Tillerson as secretary of state to the United States Senate. The Senate Foreign Relations Committee approved Tillerson's nomination with a strict party-line vote of 11–10 on January 23, 2017.

The Senate confirmed Tillerson as secretary of state on February 1, 2017. The Senate voted 56 to 43, with all 52 Republicans in support of his nomination, as well as three Democrats and one independent. He was sworn in on the same day by Vice President Mike Pence.

The number of votes against Tillerson's confirmation was unusual for a secretary of state, as the previous record for votes against a nominee for secretary of state had been fourteen.

Confirmation process
Voting body	Vote date	Vote results
Senate Committee on Foreign Relations	January 23, 2017	11–10
Full Senate	February 1, 2017	56–43

=== Tenure ===
On February 15, 2017, Tillerson embarked on his first overseas trip as secretary of state, to Bonn, Germany, for a meeting with foreign ministers from the G20. In Bonn, Tillerson had meetings with Foreign Minister Sergey Lavrov of Russia and Foreign Secretary Boris Johnson of the United Kingdom, as well as his counterparts from Italy, Turkey, Saudi Arabia, Oman, and the United Arab Emirates. Tillerson urged Russia to withdraw from eastern Ukraine, saying "the United States will consider working with Russia when we can find areas of practical cooperation that will benefit the American people. Where we do not see eye to eye, the United States will stand up for the interests and values of America and her allies. As we search for new common ground, we expect Russia to honor its commitment to the Minsk agreements and work to de-escalate the violence in Ukraine." Tillerson also reaffirmed U.S. commitment to defending South Korea and Japan.

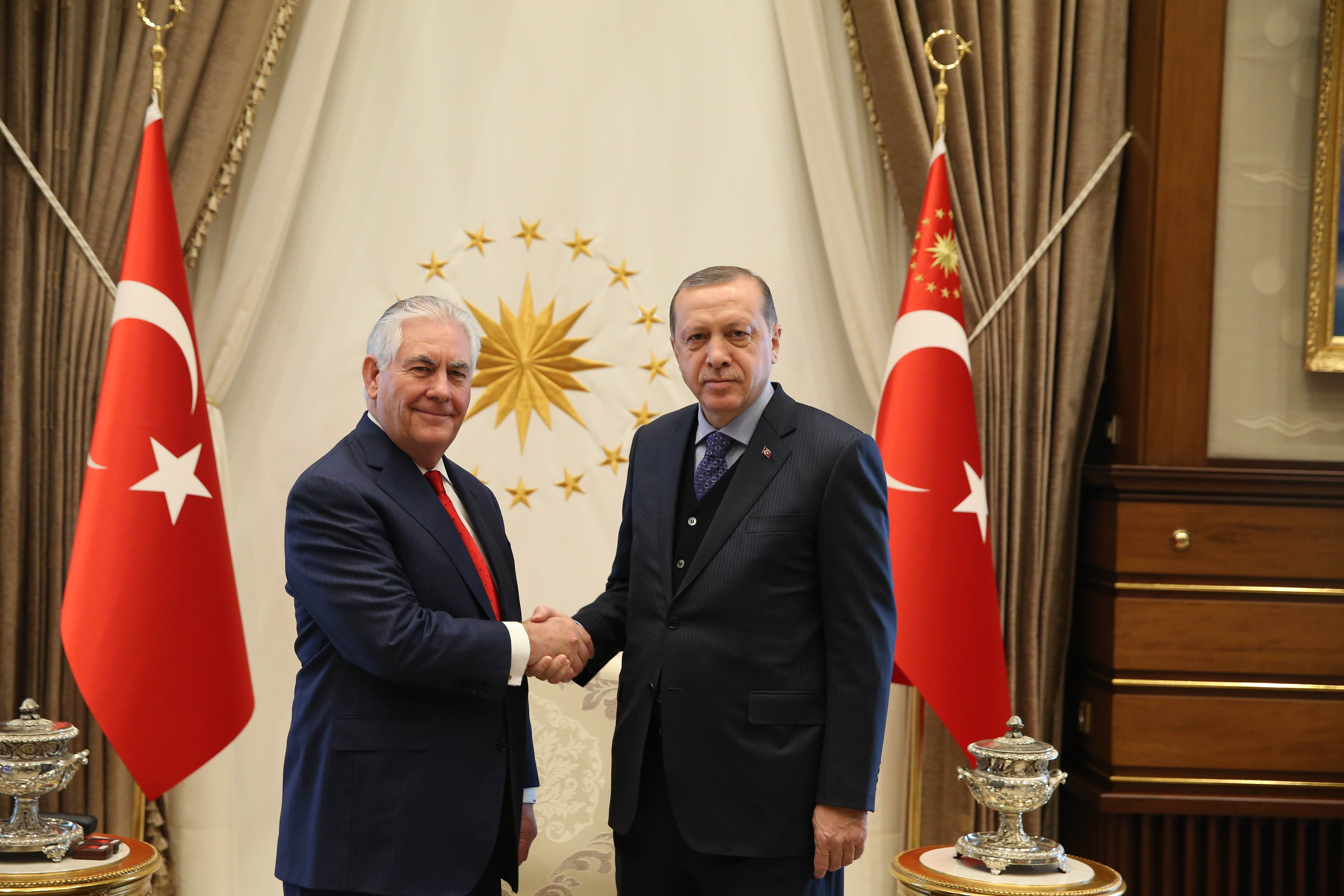
Tillerson with Turkish president Erdoğan at the Presidential Complex in Ankara on March 30, 2017

Tillerson made his first visit to Mexico on February 23, 2017, traveling with Secretary of Homeland Security John F. Kelly. When meeting with Secretary of Foreign Affairs Luis Videgaray Caso of Mexico, Tillerson acknowledged differences between the U.S. and Mexico on views of border security, but also acknowledged the need for cooperation in addressing migration, as well as arms trafficking. Tillerson recused himself from TransCanada's application for a presidential permit for the proposed Keystone XL pipeline.

Before the inauguration, Tillerson selected Elliott Abrams to be the U.S. deputy secretary of state. In February 2017, they interviewed President Trump in the Oval Office. There, Tillerson contradicted the president's criticism of the Foreign Corrupt Practices Act, advising Trump of Exxon's success in refusing a bribe demand by Yemen's oil minister. The next day, Fox News criticized Abrams, and Tillerson soon told Abrams he would not be nominated.

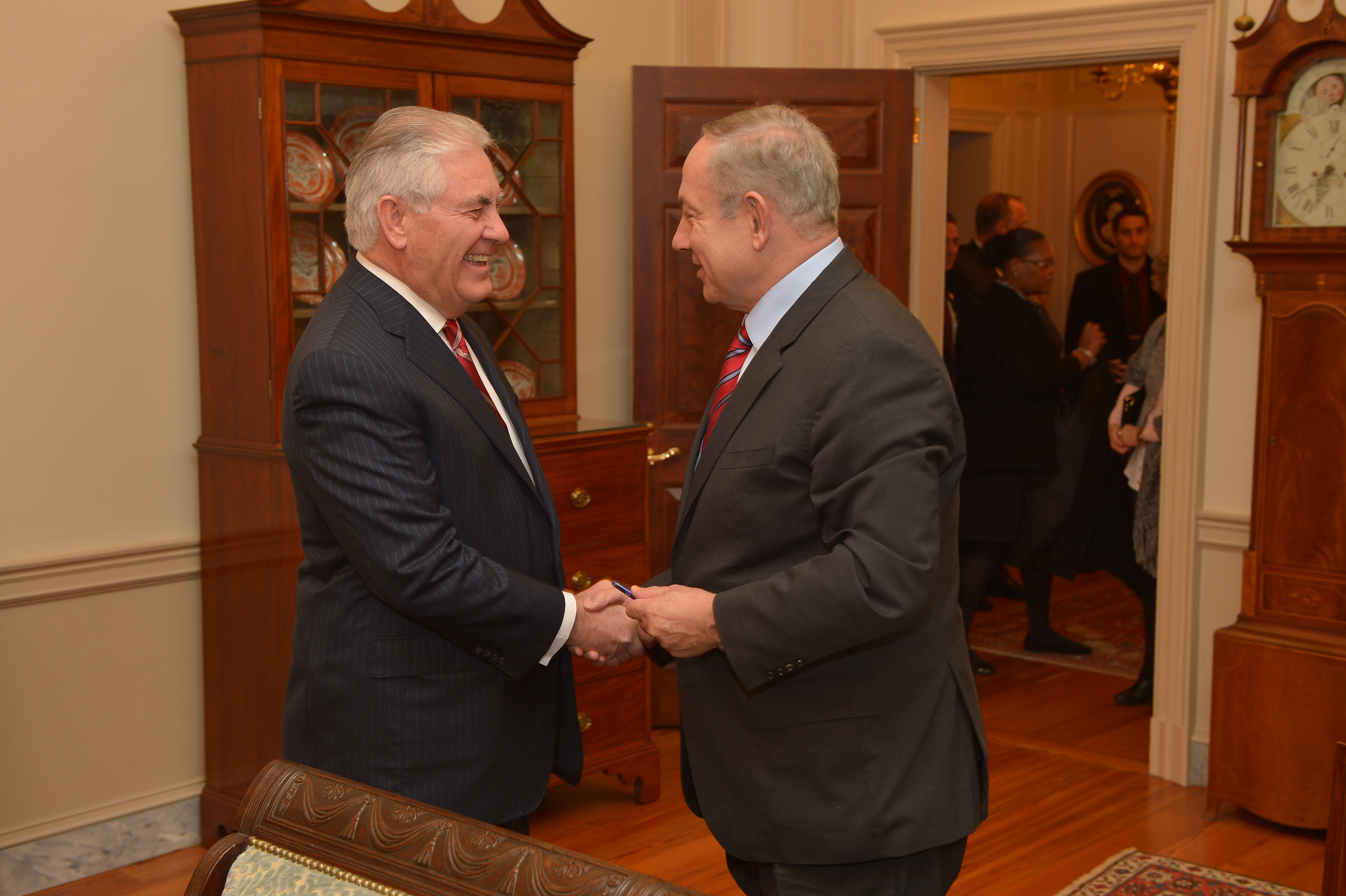
Rex Tillerson with Israeli prime minister Benjamin Netanyahu

In mid-March 2017, Tillerson made his first trip to Asia, traveling to Japan, South Korea, and China. Tillerson remarked that diplomatic efforts in the past twenty years to stop North Korea's nuclear development had "failed". Tillerson also stated the United States may need to take preemptive action, remarking, "Certainly, we do not want things to get to a military conflict ... but obviously, if North Korea takes actions that threatens the South Korean forces or our own forces, then that would be met with an appropriate response. If they elevate the threat of their weapons program to a level that we believe that requires action, that option is on the table."

On March 30, 2017, Tillerson met with President Recep Tayyip Erdoğan of Turkey. Turkey has criticized the United States over its support for Syrian Kurds. In May, protestors and Erdoğan's bodyguards clashed outside of the Turkish ambassador's residence in Washington, D.C. Tillerson said the incident was "outrageous" and that the Trump administration has expressed "dismay" over it. He said the administration would await the outcome of an investigation before taking further action.

In mid-April 2017, Tillerson made his first trip to Russia as secretary of state, meeting with Foreign Minister Sergey Lavrov and President Vladimir Putin. At a news conference, Tillerson remarked that Russian–U.S. relations were at a "low point". Tillerson also warned Russia of the risk of "becoming irrelevant in the Middle East" by continuing to support Syrian president Bashar al-Assad.

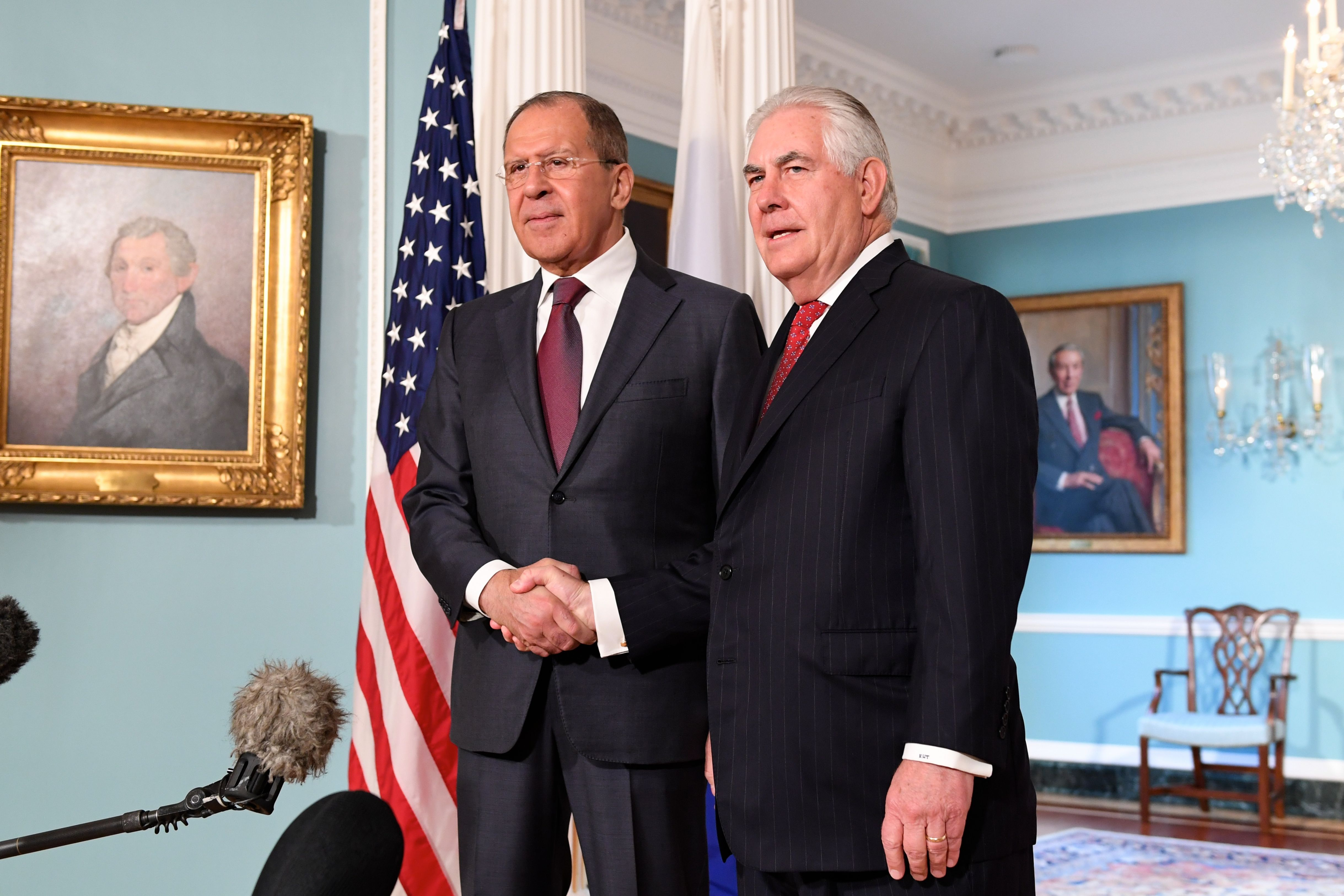
Tillerson and Russian foreign minister Sergey Lavrov shake hands before their bilateral meeting at the U.S. Department of State in Washington, D.C., on May 10, 2017

In May 2017, Tillerson joined Trump on the president's first overseas trip, to Saudi Arabia.

In June 2017, Tillerson excluded Myanmar, Iraq, and Afghanistan from the list of countries that employ child soldiers in that year's Trafficking in Persons Report, rejecting the unanimous recommendations of staff. Staff then circulated a memo in their Dissent Channel alleging that Tillerson's decision was in violation of the Child Soldiers Prevention Act. In late November 2017, the topic garnered national attention when the Department of State defended Tillerson's actions in the wake of an anonymous complaint by an official to the department's inspector general and the distribution of supporting documents to the inspector general and to the Senate Foreign Relations Committee.

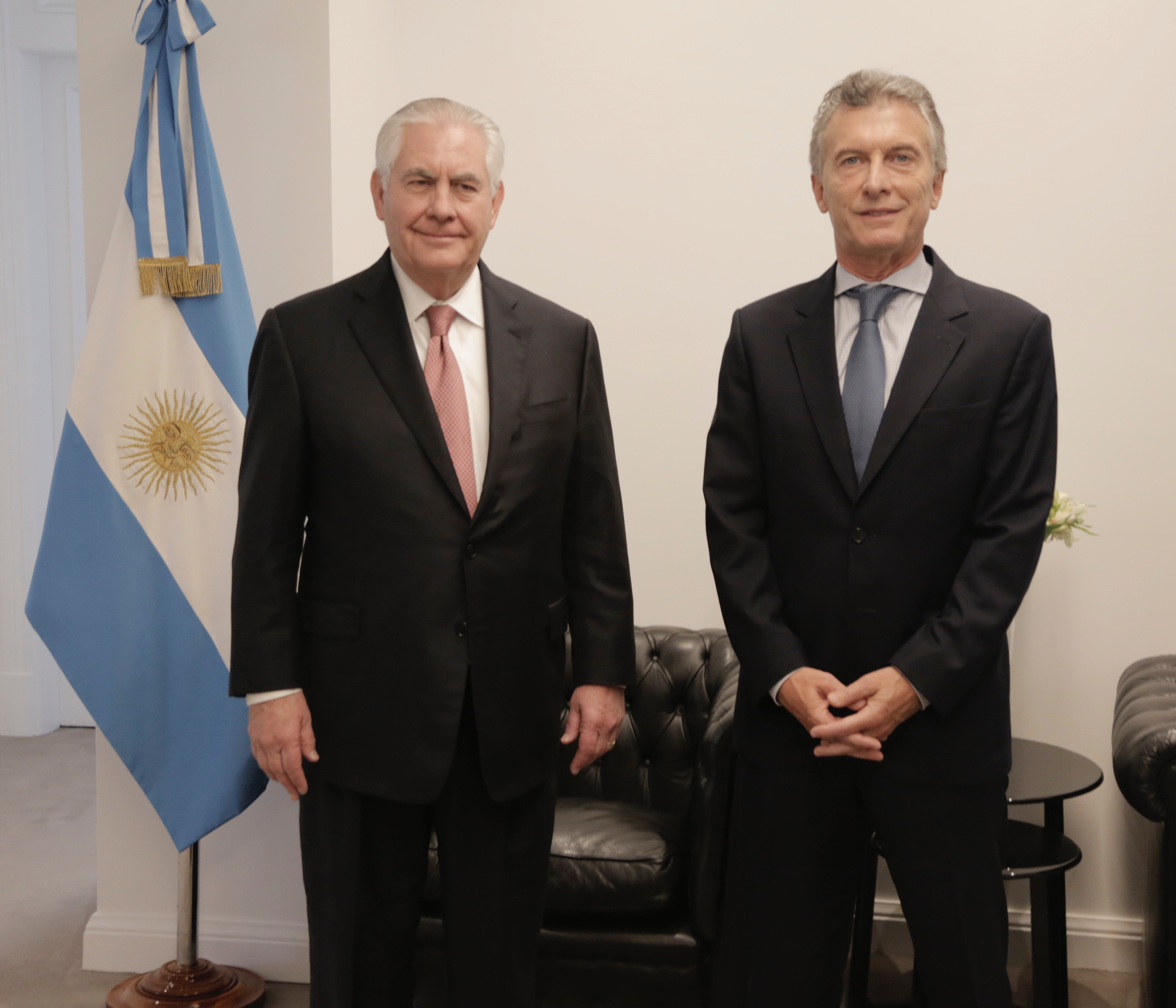
Tillerson with Argentine President Mauricio Macri in Buenos Aires, February 2018

President Trump's 2018 United States federal budget sought to reduce the Department of State's budget by 31%. Tillerson froze most hiring and sought to remove 2,000 career diplomats by offering them $25,000 buyouts. In June 2017, Tillerson told graduates of the Rangel and the Pickering foreign affairs fellowships that their offers to join the United States Foreign Service were rescinded, and that they needed to repay the $85,000 scholarships or agree to work in temporary positions. Tillerson reversed that decision and allowed the graduates to become full Foreign Service Officers after being asked to do so by 31 members of Congress. Applications to take the Foreign Service entrance exam dropped fifty percent that year.

Tillerson and his staff fired career ambassadors Patrick F. Kennedy and Kristie Kenney, and attempted to remove Linda Thomas-Greenfield, who then retired.

Tillerson selected Margaret Peterlin to be his chief of staff. Tillerson is reported to have relied heavily on Peterlin, as well as his chief of policy, Brian Hook. Tillerson attempted to centralize much decision making under the Policy Planning Staff.

Tillerson initiated the Quadrennial Diplomacy and Development Review, focusing on the Department of State's organizational structure. He contracted for management consulting from Deloitte and hired Insigniam to conduct a "listening tour" survey for $1 million. Tillerson attempted to reduce inefficiencies within the Department of State, though it was described as a "botched reorganization" that created a hollowed-out and dysfunctional department, reportedly leading to micromanagement and poor morale among career diplomats, yet Tillerson was also praised by one writer for setting the right tone for diplomats.

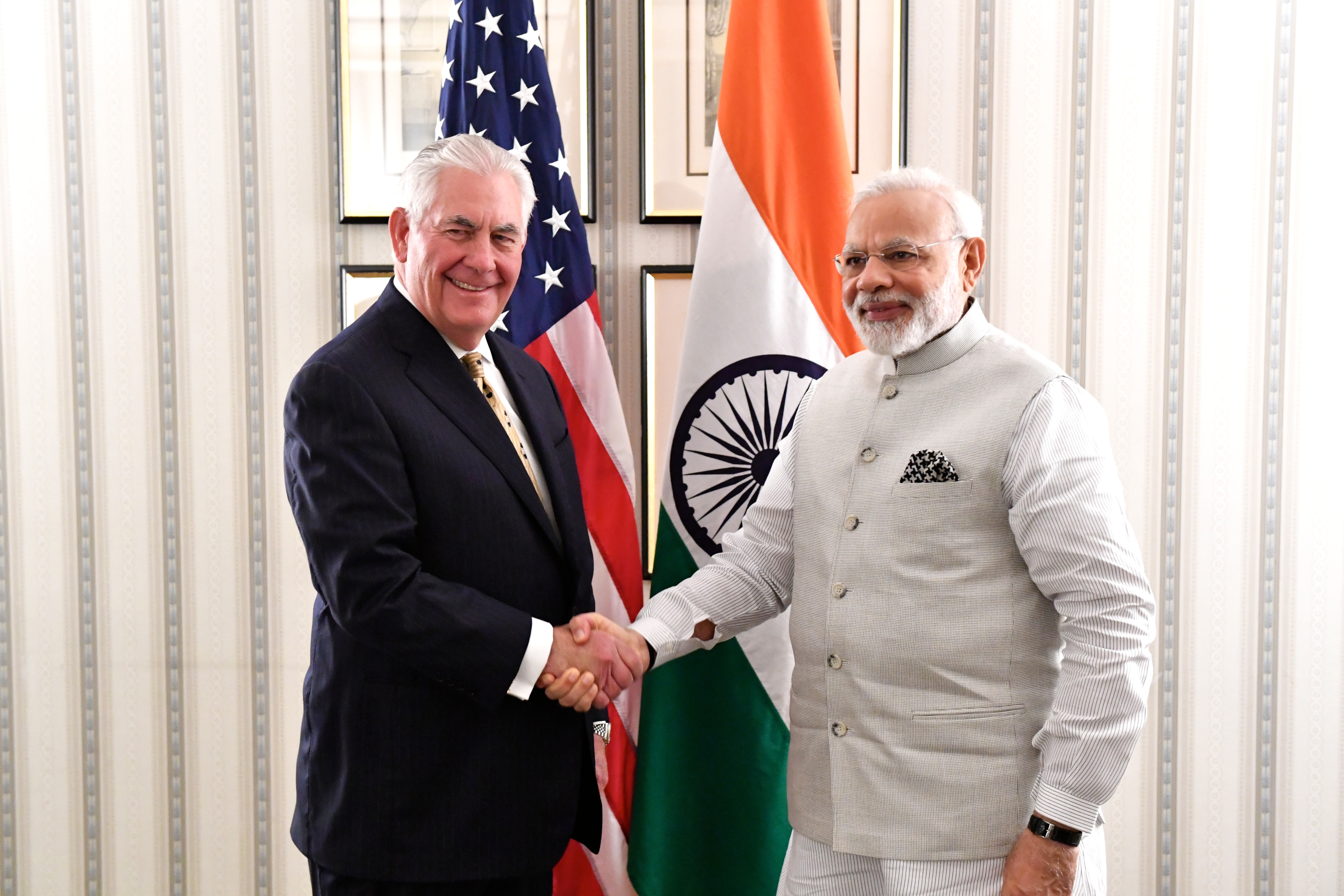
Tillerson meets with Indian prime minister Narendra Modi, June 26, 2017

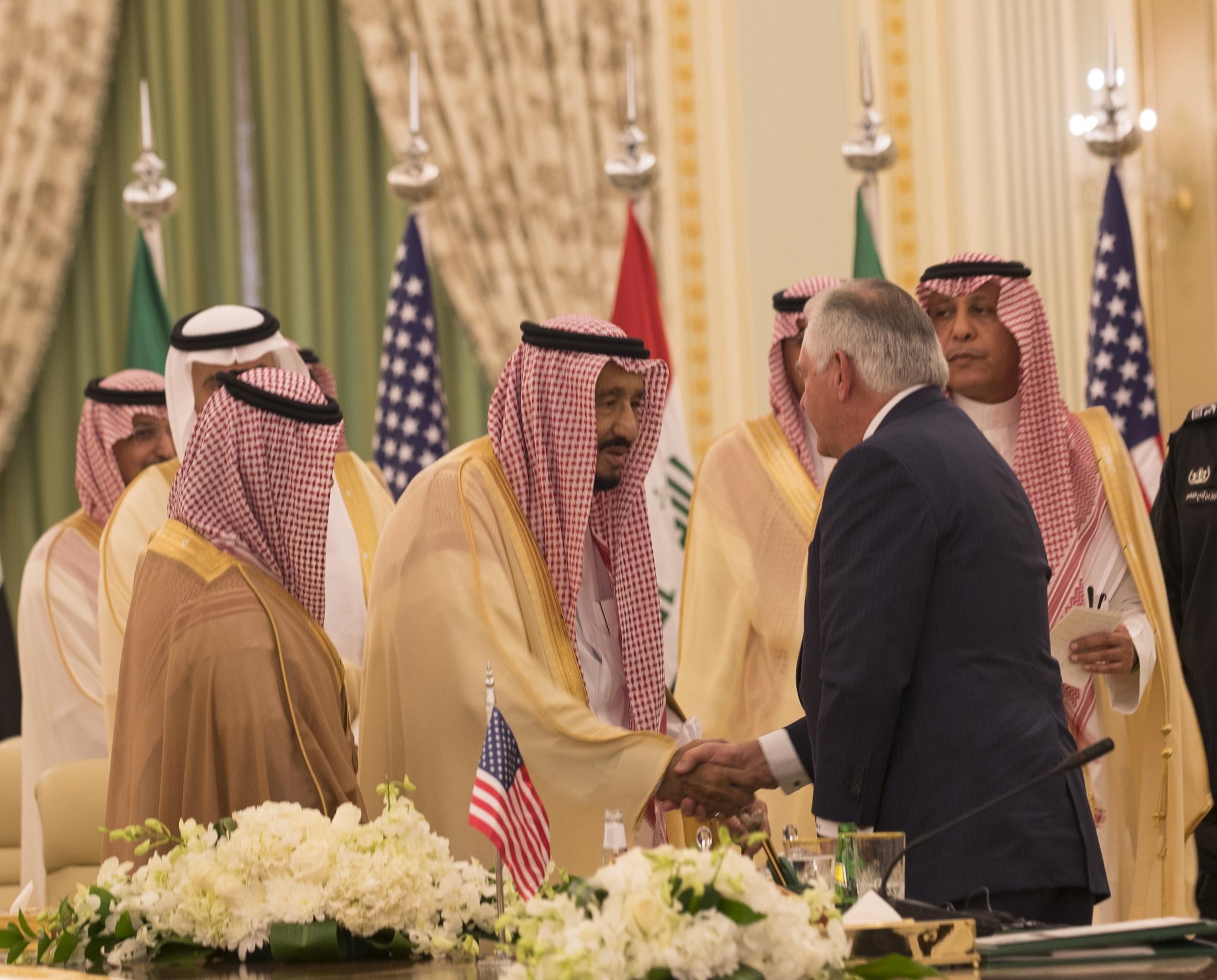
Tillerson greets King Salman of Saudi Arabia, Riyadh, October 22, 2017

In November 2017, Tillerson said that recent Rohingya persecution in Myanmar was ethnic cleansing.

Tillerson made a concerted effort to respond to the Department of State's backlog of Freedom of Information Act requests that reached into Secretary Hillary Clinton's tenure, assigning midlevel diplomats from every bureau to perform document review beside unpaid interns.

By the end of November 2017, just 10 of the top 44 political positions in the Department of State had been filled. A large number of Senior Foreign Service officers had resigned under Tillerson, with the number of career ambassadors and ministers dropping more than 50%, from 39 to 19, and the number of minister-counselors dropping 18% to 369.

On March 13, 2018, Tillerson commented on the nerve gas poisoning in the United Kingdom of a former Russian spy and his daughter, calling it a "really egregious act" that clearly "came from Russia".

==== Tillerson's assessment of Trump ====
In October 2017, news reports surfaced regarding a deteriorating relationship between Tillerson and Trump. According to reports, in a July 20 meeting, Trump allegedly suggested a tenfold increase in the U.S. nuclear arsenal, which would cost trillions and take centuries—reports that were denied by White House officials and by Trump—after which individuals familiar with the meeting told journalists that Tillerson either called Trump a "moron" or a "fucking moron." Additionally, there were well-sourced reports of Tillerson offering to resign his office as secretary of state, only to be discouraged from doing so by Vice President Mike Pence; these were officially denied both by Tillerson and by the White House. Furthermore, on October 1, Trump directly contradicted, via Twitter, Tillerson's policy of negotiation with North Korea; this move was widely panned by experts, who thought such a public undermining of America's chief diplomat would weaken his ability to negotiate. On October 10, after Tillerson's alleged "moron" comment was reported in the media, Trump publicly challenged Tillerson to "IQ tests"; three days later Senator Bob Corker from Tennessee, the chair of the influential Senate Foreign Relations Committee who had become a vocal Trump critic around that time, remarked that Trump was "publicly castrating" Tillerson.

Tillerson was reportedly angered by the political speech President Trump delivered at the 2017 National Scout Jamboree.

After leaving the Trump administration, Tillerson spoke to Bob Schieffer about his tenure: "It was challenging for me coming from the disciplined, highly process-oriented Exxon Mobil corporation . . . to go to work for a man who is pretty undisciplined, doesn't like to read, doesn't read briefing reports, doesn't like to get into the details of a lot of things, but rather just kind of says, 'This is what I believe.'"

Speaking to members and staffers of the House Foreign Affairs Committee in May 2019, Tillerson said he and Trump "shared a common goal: to secure and advance America's place in the world and to promote and protect American values," but he noted they do not share the same "value system." Asked to describe Trump's values, he replied, "I cannot."

In May 2019, Tillerson privately discussed with members of Congress his frustration that during his tenure Trump's son-in-law and senior advisor Jared Kushner conducted discussions with foreign dignitaries without advising the Department of State. In one instance, Tillerson entered a Washington restaurant and was asked by the owner if he wanted to meet with the Mexican foreign minister, who was dining with Kushner in the back of the restaurant; Tillerson was unaware the foreign minister was in Washington.

==== Dismissal ====
According to the White House, Trump communicated with Tillerson on March 9 and told him he would be replaced. Tillerson cut short a visit to Africa and returned to the United States on March 12. On March 13, Trump announced via Twitter that Tillerson was out. A spokesman for Tillerson, Steve Goldstein, the under secretary of state for public diplomacy, was quoted in The Washington Post that Tillerson did not know why he had been fired by Trump and only found out about his firing when he read Trump's tweet on the morning of March 13; Goldstein, who was generally perceived within the White House as being anti-Trump, was fired by the White House later that day, reportedly for contradicting the official account of Tillerson's dismissal. A senior Trump administration official cited "upcoming North Korea talks and various trade negotiations" as the reason for replacing Tillerson. Trump later told reporters his differences with Tillerson came down to personal chemistry and disagreements on policy, adding that he and CIA director Mike Pompeo "have a very similar thought process". The New York Times reported that Lebanese-American businessman George Nader turned Trump's major fundraiser Elliott Broidy "into an instrument of influence at the White House for the rulers of Saudi Arabia and the United Arab Emirates ... High on the agenda of the two men ... was pushing the White House to remove Secretary of State Rex W. Tillerson." UAE and Saudi Arabia lobbied Trump to fire Tillerson for not supporting the blockade of Qatar during the Qatar diplomatic crisis. Robert Malley, former top Middle East adviser to President Barack Obama, said that "senior Qatari officials with whom I spoke were convinced – or at least acted as if they were convinced – that Saudi Arabia and the UAE had been planning a military attack on their country that was halted as a result" of Tillerson's intervention.

John Sullivan, the deputy secretary of state, served as acting secretary until March 31, when Tillerson formally left office. Trump proposed Mike Pompeo (with whom Trump had had a much more positive relationship) as Tillerson's successor and Gina Haspel as the new CIA director. Haspel was confirmed on May 17, 2018, making her the first female CIA director. Tillerson's total time in office was 423 days, making him the shortest-serving secretary of state since Lawrence Eagleburger (1992–1993). The last time a president's first appointee to the position served for less time was in 1898, when John Sherman left office after 413 days. Tillerson is also the only secretary of state since at least 1945 to have been fired.

In December 2018, President Trump called Tillerson "dumb as a rock" and "lazy as hell" after Tillerson held a speech where he described Trump as "pretty undisciplined". Trump made similar remarks again in May 2019 after Tillerson reportedly said Trump had been outmaneuvered in a meeting with Vladimir Putin. Trump had previously lauded Tillerson, describing him as "one of the truly great business leaders of the world" and a "world class player and dealmaker".

==== Assessments of tenure ====
In March 2017, Robert Jervis of Columbia University wrote that Tillerson "had little impact on the Trump administration so far" and that his influence would continue to wane. That same month, William Inboden of the University of Texas at Austin defended Tillerson, saying he deserves more time. Daniel W. Drezner of the Fletcher School of Law and Diplomacy at Tufts University was highly critical of Tillerson, calling him an "unmitigated disaster", and "the most incompetent secretary of state in modern history". Elliot Cohen of Johns Hopkins University said Tillerson might be one of the weakest secretaries of state in American history. Elizabeth Saunders of George Washington University said Tillerson's tenure had damaged the Department of State "for a generation" and decreased America's ability to respond to major crises.

== Political positions ==
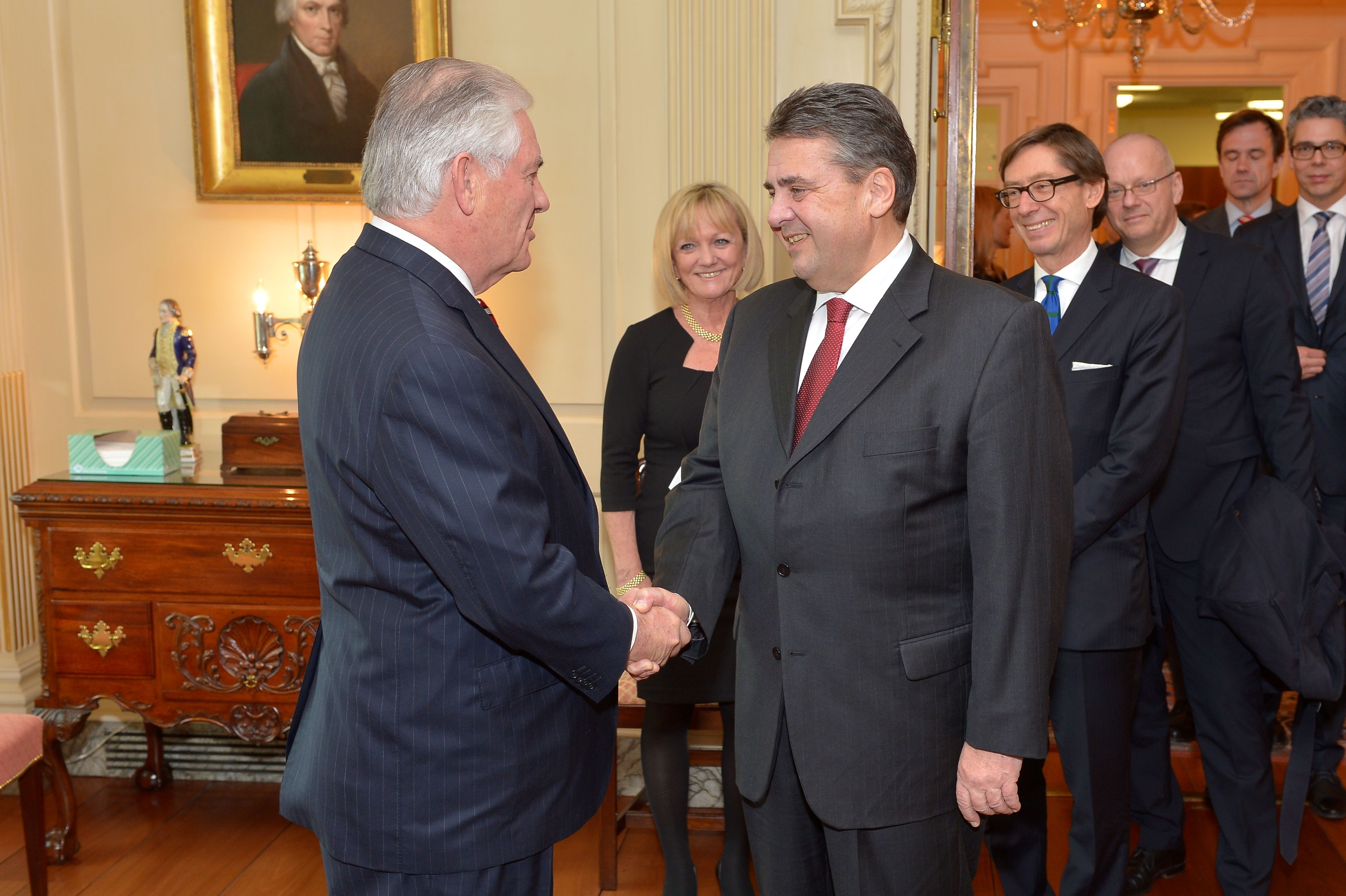
Tillerson greets German foreign minister Sigmar Gabriel, Washington, D.C., February 2, 2017

In October 2017, Politico reported that Tillerson's major foreign policy positions include "urging the United States to stay in the Trans-Pacific Partnership and the Paris climate accord, taking a hard line on Russia, advocating negotiations and dialogue to defuse the mounting crisis with North Korea, advocating for continued U.S. adherence to the Iran nuclear deal, taking a neutral position in the dispute between Qatar and Saudi Arabia, and reassuring jittery allies, from South Korea and Japan to our NATO partners, that America still has their back".

=== Russia and Saudi Arabia ===
In 2014, Tillerson expressed opposition to the sanctions against Russia in response to the annexation of Crimea at an Exxon shareholder meeting. He told the meeting "We do not support sanctions, generally, because we don't find them to be effective unless they are very well implemented comprehensively and that's a very hard thing to do." In 2016, Tillerson said the U.S. should have deployed military units to neighboring states next to Russia in a more "muscular" response. In 2017, Tillerson said Russia's annexation of Crimea was illegal. He also compared China's controversial island-building in the South China Sea to Russia's annexation of Crimea.

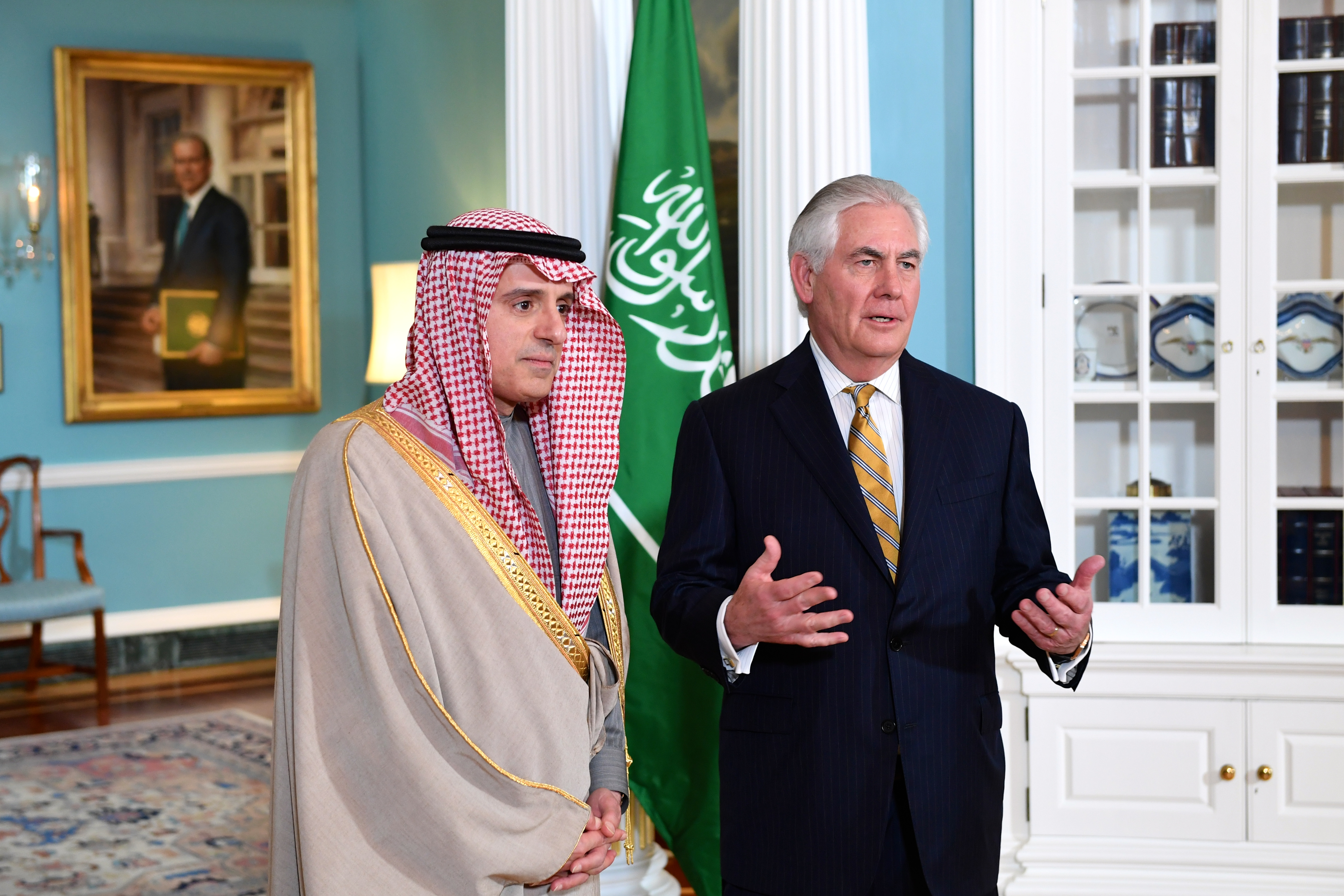
Tillerson and Saudi foreign minister Adel al-Jubeir, Washington, D.C., March 23, 2017

During his secretary of state confirmation hearings, Marco Rubio asked Tillerson if he would label Saudi Arabia as a "human rights violator". Tillerson declined to do so, saying: "When you designate someone or label someone, is that the most effective way to have progress be able to be made in Saudi Arabia or any other country?" He supported the Saudi Arabian-led intervention in Yemen.

=== Climate change and carbon tax ===
Tillerson announced in 2009 that ExxonMobil favored a carbon tax as "the most efficient means of reflecting the cost of carbon in all economic decisions—from investments made by companies to fuel their requirements to the product choices made by consumers". In October 2016, less than two months before his nomination as Secretary of State, he reaffirmed that ExxonMobil believed a carbon tax would be "the best policy of those being considered. Replacing the hodge-podge of current, largely ineffective regulations with a revenue-neutral carbon tax would ensure a uniform and predictable cost of carbon across the economy ... allow market forces to drive solutions ... maximize transparency, reduce administrative complexity, promote global participation and easily adjust" to new knowledge in climate science and in the policy consequences of various courses of action.

An article in The New York Times suggested that ExxonMobil's embrace of a carbon tax in October 2009 may have simply been an effort to avoid cap and trade legislation that was then being considered by the U.S. Congress as an alternative method of carbon pricing. A Time magazine article in December 2016 asserted that since Tillerson announced his company's preference for a carbon tax, ExxonMobil "has not made a carbon tax a focus of its massive lobbying efforts and has supported a number of candidates and organizations that oppose measures to tackle the [climate change] issue".

In 2010, Tillerson said that while he acknowledged humans were affecting the climate through greenhouse gas emissions to some degree, it was not yet clear "to what extent and therefore what can you do about it". At the 2020 Argus Americas Crude Summit, Tillerson further expressed doubt that humans could do anything to combat climate change.

In 2012, Tillerson stated concerning climate change that "there are much more pressing priorities that we as a – as a human being, race, and society need to deal with ... you'd save millions upon millions of lives by making fossil fuels more available" to the world's poor, and that "It's an engineering problem and there will be an engineering solution."

In 2016, Tillerson stated, "The world is going to have to continue using fossil fuels, whether they like it or not."

=== Support for the Trans-Pacific Partnership (TPP) ===
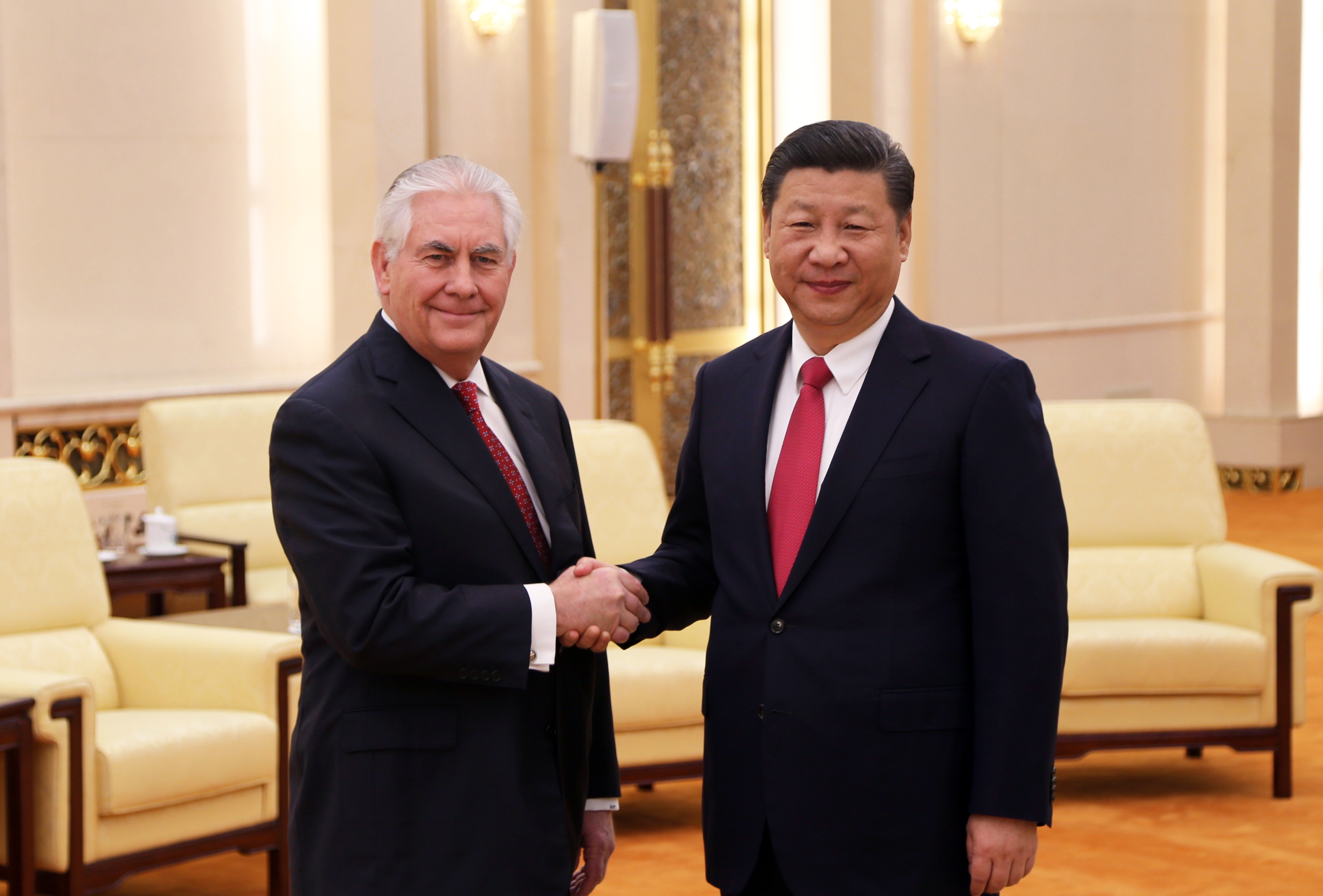
Tillerson with China's President Xi Jinping before their meeting in Beijing, March 19, 2017

In 2013, Tillerson outlined his support for the Trans-Pacific Partnership (TPP), stating at the Global Security Forum: "One of the most promising developments on this front is the ongoing effort for the Trans-Pacific Partnership ... The 11 nations that have been working to lower trade barriers and end protectionist policies under this partnership are a diverse mix of developed and developing economies. But all of them understand the value of open markets to growth and progress for every nation."

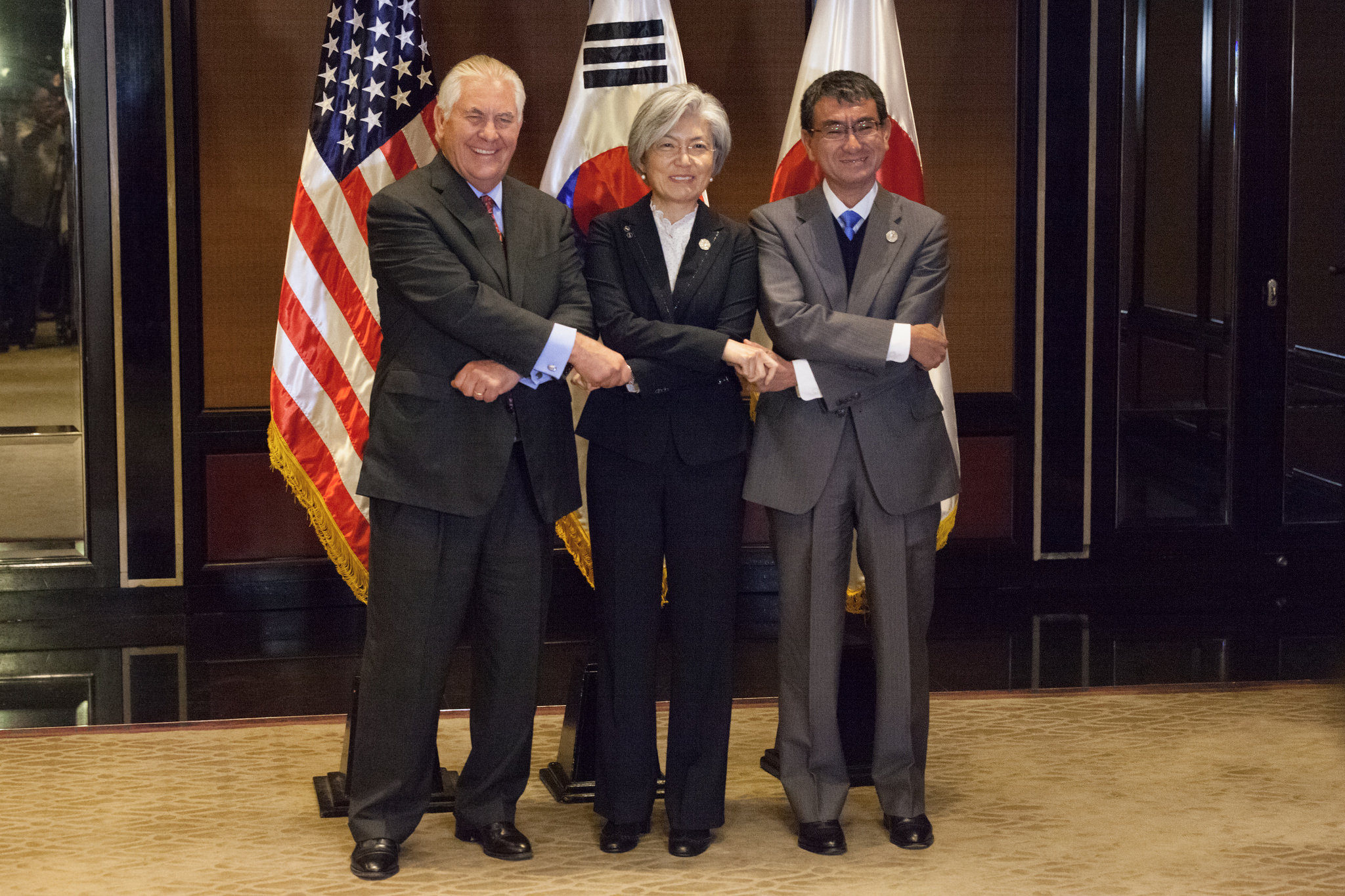
Tillerson, South Korean foreign minister Kang Kyung-wha and Japanese foreign minister Tarō Kōno, August 7, 2017

=== Free trade ===
Speaking in March 2007 at a Council on Foreign Relations event, Tillerson said:

Should the United States seek so-called energy independence in an elusive effort to insulate this country from the impact of world events on the economy, or should Americans pursue the path of international engagement, seeking ways to better compete within the global market for energy? Like the Council's founders, I believe we must choose the course of greater international engagement ... The central reality is this: The global free market for energy provides the most effective means of achieving U.S. energy security by promoting resource development, enabling diversification, multiplying our supply channels, encouraging efficiency, and spurring innovation.

=== Government regulation ===
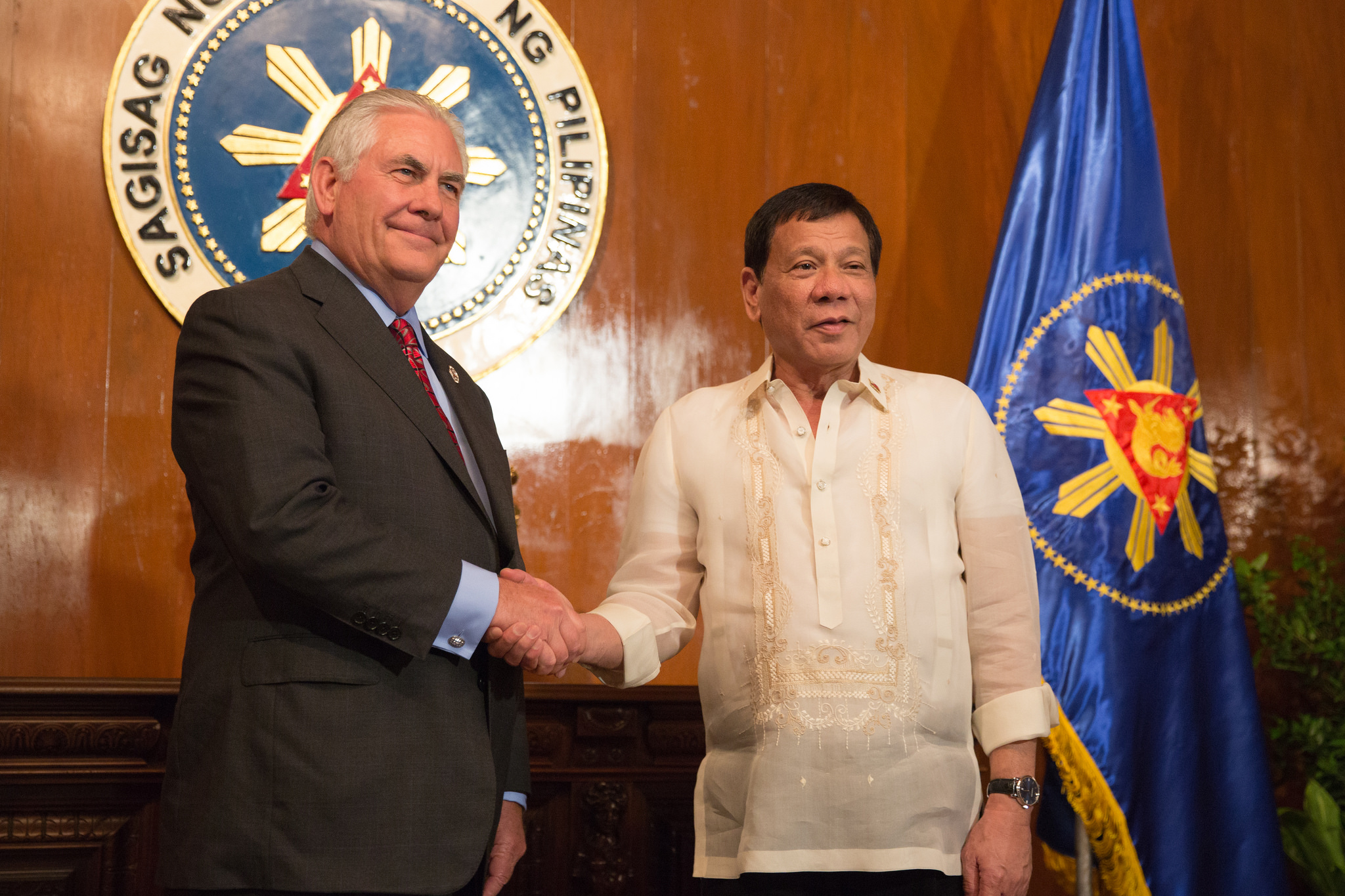
Tillerson with Philippine President Rodrigo Duterte at Malacañang Palace in Manila, Philippines on August 7, 2017

In 2012, in an interview with The Wall Street Journal, Tillerson expressed his impatience with government regulation, saying "there are a thousand ways you can be told 'no' in this country."

=== Education ===
In September 2013, Tillerson wrote an op-ed piece in The Wall Street Journal defending Common Core.

=== Republican campaign fundraising and donations ===
According to OpenSecrets, Tillerson has made tens of thousands of dollars of political donations to Republican groups and candidates. According to Federal Election Commission (FEC) records, he gave a total of $468,970 in contributions to Republican candidates and committees from 2000 to 2016.

He has contributed to the political campaigns of George W. Bush, as well as Mitt Romney in 2012, and Mitch McConnell. He did not donate to Donald Trump's campaign. He donated to Jeb Bush's campaign during the 2016 Republican primaries.

== Personal life ==
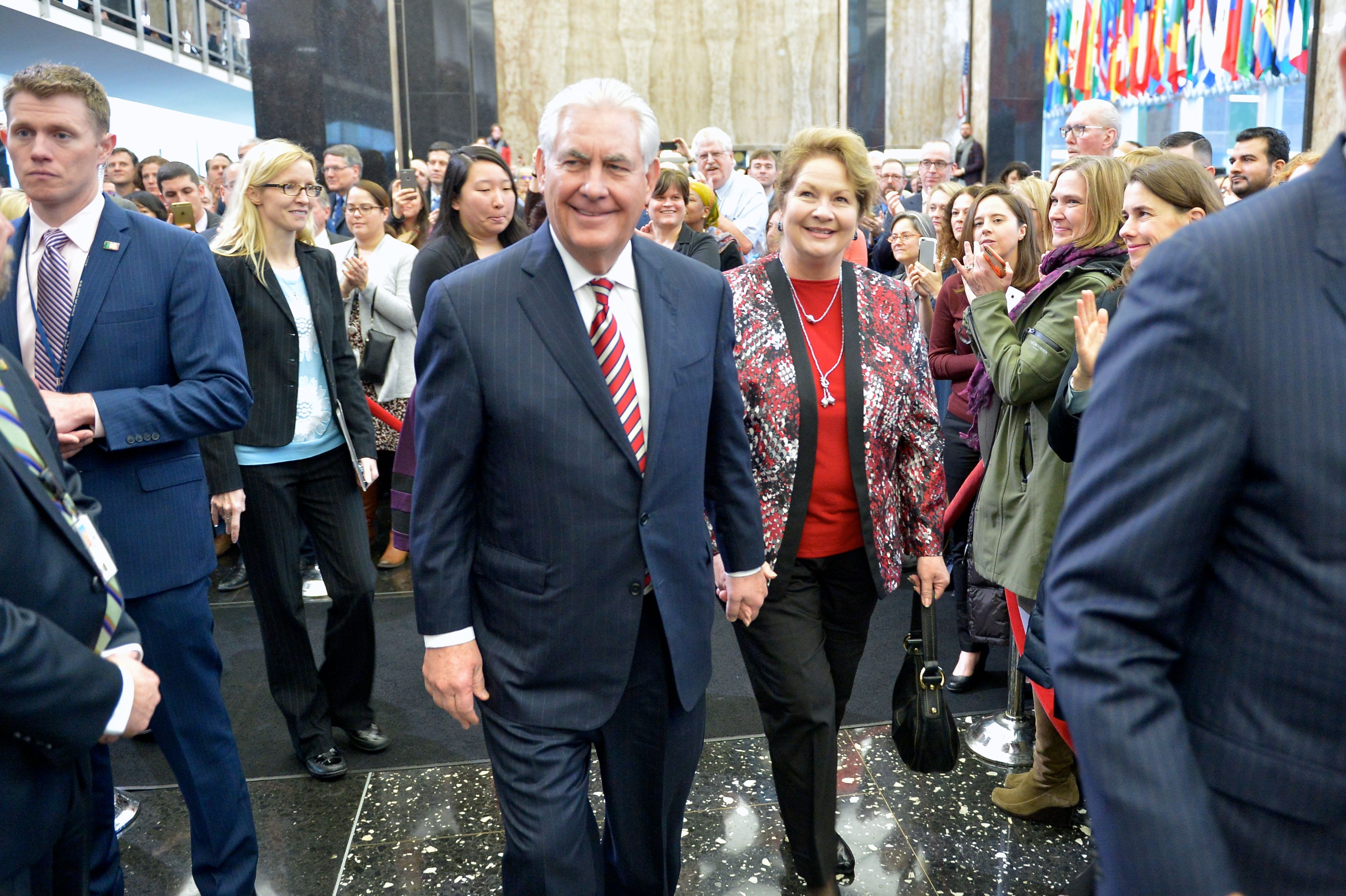
Tillerson and Renda St. Clair walk through the State Department building on his first day as Secretary of State, February 1, 2017

Tillerson has been married twice. He divorced Jamie Lee Henry, his first wife, with whom he has two children. In 1986, Tillerson married Renda St. Clair. Tillerson and St. Clair also have a child.

Tillerson resides in Bartonville, Texas. Following his appointment as secretary of state, Tillerson bought a home in Kalorama, Washington, D.C.

He is a Congregationalist who holds a membership in the National Association of Congregational Christian Churches, a mainline Reformed denomination. He and his wife donated between $5,000 and $10,000 to the denomination's The Congregationalist Magazine in 2012.

On February 20, 2014, news outlets reported that Tillerson and his wife had joined opponents of a proposed water tower that could lead to fracking-related traffic near their homes. Plaintiffs included former U.S. House of Representatives Majority Leader Dick Armey and his wife. The Tillersons dropped out of the lawsuit after a judge dismissed their claim in November 2014.

On May 16, 2018, Tillerson gave a graduation speech at Virginia Military Institute. In an apparent rebuke of President Trump, Tillerson warned that there is "a growing crisis in ethics and integrity". "If our leaders seek to conceal the truth or we as people become accepting of alternative realities that are no longer grounded in facts, then we as American citizens are on a pathway to relinquishing our freedom."

== See also ==
- List of United States secretaries of state
- List of foreign ministers in 2017
- List of people and organizations named in the Paradise Papers
- The Power of Big Oil

Business positions
Preceded by Lee Raymond	Chief Executive Officer of ExxonMobil; 2006–2016	Succeeded by Darren Woods
Non-profit organization positions
Preceded by John Gottschalk	President of the Boy Scouts of America; 2010–2012	Succeeded by Wayne M. Perry
Political offices
Preceded by John Kerry	United States Secretary of State; 2017–2018	Succeeded by Mike Pompeo
U.S. order of precedence (ceremonial)
Preceded by John Kerry as Former U.S. Secretary of State	Order of precedence of the United States as Former U.S. Secretary of State	Succeeded by Mike Pompeo as Former U.S. Secretary of State
