= List of East Texas A&M Lions in the NFL draft =

This is a list of East Texas A&M Lions football players in the NFL draft.

== Key ==
| B | Back | K | Kicker | NT | Nose tackle |
| C | Center | LB | Linebacker | FB | Fullback |
| DB | Defensive back | P | Punter | HB | Halfback |
| DE | Defensive end | QB | Quarterback | WR | Wide receiver |
| DT | Defensive tackle | RB | Running back | G | Guard |
| E | End | T | Offensive tackle | TE | Tight end |

| = Pro Bowler |
| = Hall of Famer |

== Selections ==
| Year | Round | Pick | Overall | Player | Team | Position |
|---|---|---|---|---|---|---|
| 1939 | 7 | 7 | 57 | Darrell Tully | Detroit Lions | B |
| 1939 | 15 | 7 | 137 | Gene Hodge | Detroit Lions | E |
| 1941 | 9 | 1 | 71 | P. K. Rogers | Philadelphia Eagles | B |
| 1947 | 15 | 1 | 126 | J. W. Meeks | Detroit Lions | B |
| 1947 | 20 | 10 | 205 | Jim Batchelor | Chicago Bears | B |
| 1947 | 25 | 1 | 226 | Jim Cody | Detroit Lions | T |
| 1949 | 15 | 5 | 176 | Clint Shipman | Pittsburgh Steelers | T |
| 1953 | 9 | 5 | 102 | Bruno Ashley | Chicago Bears | T |
| 1953 | 25 | 12 | 301 | Marv Brown | Detroit Lions | B |
| 1956 | 9 | 8 | 105 | Ken Braden | New York Giants | C |
| 1956 | 24 | 6 | 283 | Bobby Fox | Baltimore Colts | QB |
| 1956 | 27 | 9 | 322 | Waylon Buchannon | Chicago Bears | E |
| 1957 | 14 | 11 | 169 | Dean Hesse | New York Giants | T |
| 1957 | 18 | 5 | 210 | Len Bigbee | Pittsburgh Steelers | E |
| 1958 | 23 | 7 | 272 | Gary Berry | Los Angeles Rams | B |
| 1958 | 24 | 7 | 284 | Norm Roberts | Los Angeles Rams | E |
| 1958 | 24 | 10 | 287 | Dee Mackey | San Francisco 49ers | E |
| 1959 | 24 | 3 | 279 | Jim Reed | Chicago Cardinals | G |
| 1960 | 14 | 5 | 161 | Jon Gilliam | Green Bay Packers | C |
| 1961 | 9 | 9 | 121 | Everisto DeLeon Nino | San Francisco 49ers | T |
| 1963 | 20 | 13 | 279 | Gordon Scarborough | Detroit Lions | B |
| 1964 | 10 | 1 | 127 | Fred Polser | San Francisco 49ers | T |
| 1964 | 15 | 2 | 198 | Bob Burrows | Philadelphia Eagles | T |
| 1967 | 4 | 24 | 104 | Ron Zwernemann | Kansas City Chiefs | G |
| 1968 | 3 | 17 | 72 | Sam Walton | New York Jets | T |
| 1969 | 4 | 14 | 92 | Rich Houston | New York Giants | WR |
| 1969 | 7 | 19 | 175 | Chadwick Brown | Pittsburgh Steelers | T |
| 1969 | 14 | 16 | 354 | Tom Black | San Francisco 49ers | WR |
| 1971 | 4 | 26 | 104 | Dwight White | Pittsburgh Steelers | DE |
| 1973 | 3 | 1 | 53 | Harvey Martin | Dallas Cowboys | DE |
| 1973 | 9 | 20 | 53 | Curtis Wester | Cleveland Browns | G |
| 1975 | 12 | 25 | 312 | Autry Beamon | Minnesota Vikings | DB |
| 1976 | 5 | 8 | 130 | Aundra Thompson | Green Bay Packers | RB |
| 1976 | 9 | 12 | 249 | Larry Bell | Kansas City Chiefs | DB |
| 1976 | 12 | 5 | 324 | Tim Collier | Houston Oilers | T |
| 1976 | 12 | 28 | 347 | Bill Carroll | Pittsburgh Steelers | WR |
| 1981 | 8 | 17 | 210 | Wade Wilson | Minnesota Vikings | QB |
| 1982 | 12 | 10 | 316 | Randy Smith | Los Angeles Raiders | WR |
| 1984 | 11 | 17 | 297 | Kyle Mackey | St. Louis Cardinals | QB |
| 1986 | 10 | 6 | 255 | Wes Smith | St. Louis Cardinals | WR |
| 1991 | 5 | 9 | 255 | Terry Bagsby | Tampa Bay Buccaneers | LB |
| 2000 | 4 | 12 | 106 | Antonio Wilson | Minnesota Vikings | LB |
| 2024 | 7 | 12 | 232 | Levi Drake Rodriguez | Minnesota Vikings | DT |

== Notable undrafted players ==
Note: No drafts held before 1920

| Debut year | Player name | Position | Debut NFL/AFL team | Notes |
|---|---|---|---|---|
| 1970 | Jim Thrower | DB | Philadelphia Eagles | |
| 1974 | Will Cureton | QB | Cleveland Browns | |
| 1985 | Alan Veingrad | OL | Tampa Bay Buccaneers | |
| 1989 | Michael Trigg | QB | Minnesota Vikings | |
| 1993 | Curtis Buckley | S | Tampa Bay Buccaneers | |
| 1993 | Billy Minor | WR | Philadelphia Eagles | |
| 1997 | Kevin Mathis | CB | Dallas Cowboys | |
| 2003 | Cedric Bonner | WR | Buffalo Bills | |
| 2004 | Derrick Crawford | DL | Cincinnati Bengals | |
| 2015 | Ricky Collins | WR | Green Bay Packers | |
| 2015 | Vernon Johnson | WR | Detroit Lions | |
| 2015 | Charles Tuaau | DT | Kansas City Chiefs | |
| 2018 | Luis Perez | QB | Los Angeles Rams | |
| 2022 | Kader Kohou | CB | Miami Dolphins | |
