= Rienstra =

Rienstra is a surname. Notable people with the surname include:

- Ben Rienstra (born 1990), Dutch footballer
- Chad M. Rienstra, American professor
- Daan Rienstra (born 1992), Dutch footballer
- Dick Rienstra (1941–2021), Dutch singer and actor
- John Rienstra (born 1963), American football player
- Allan A. Rienstra (born 1966), Canadian basketball player and reliability leader
