= WPC Energy =

Oil and gas industry organization

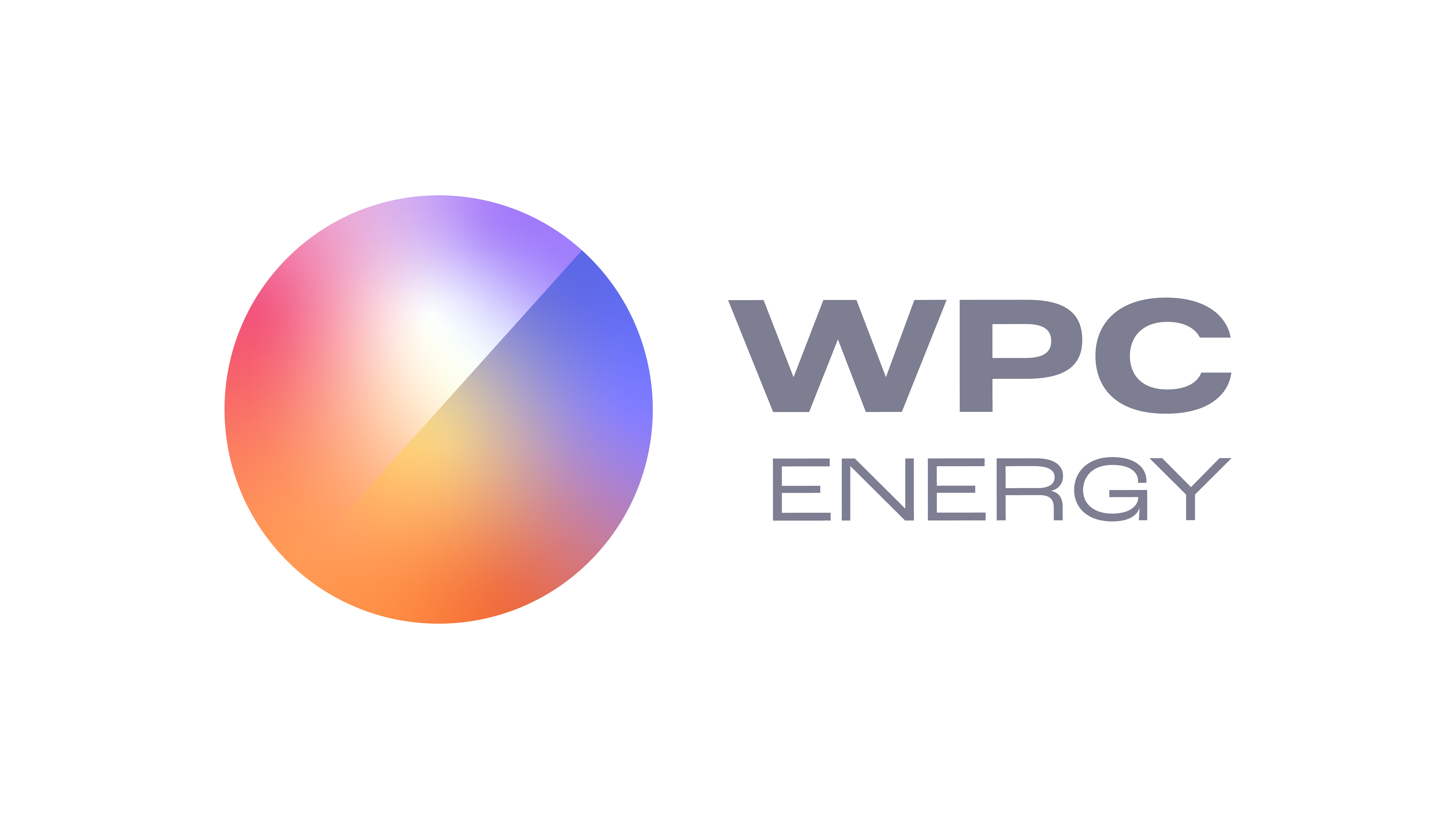
The World Forum for Energy Transformation

WPC Energy is an organisation of parties in the oil, gas and energy industry. Until 2023, the organisation was known as the World Petroleum Council.

== WPC Energy Congress ==
The organisation's premier event is called the WPC Energy Congress. Starting in 1933, the congress was held every four years until 1991, with a 14-year hiatus in between 1937 and 1951 because of World War II. After 1991, it was held every three years until the year 2000. There was a move to have it hosted every two years after the 2000 edition, with Rio de Janeiro hosting one in 2002, but the cycle returned to every three years after that. In order to host a congress, there is a bidding process by interested cities for one in a particular year.

WPC	Year	Host city	Host country
1st	1933	London (#1)	United Kingdom
2nd	1937	Paris	France
3rd	1951	The Hague	Netherlands
4th	1955	Rome	Italy
5th	1959	New York City	United States
6th	1963	Frankfurt	West Germany
7th	1967	Mexico City	Mexico
8th	1971	Moscow (#1)	Soviet Union
9th	1975	Tokyo	Japan
10th	1979	Bucharest	Romania
11th	1983	London (#2)	United Kingdom
12th	1987	Houston (#1)	United States
13th	1991	Buenos Aires	Argentina

WPC	Year	Host city	Host country
14th	1994	Stavanger	Norway
15th	1997	Beijing	China
16th	2000	Calgary (#1)	Canada
17th	2002	Rio de Janeiro	Brazil
18th	2005	Johannesburg	South Africa
19th	2008	Madrid	Spain
20th	2011	Doha	Qatar
21st	2014	Moscow (#2)	Russia
22nd	2017	Istanbul	Turkey
23rd Archived 2020-07-09 at the Wayback Machine	2021	Houston (#2)	United States
24th Archived 2020-08-05 at the Wayback Machine	2023	Calgary (#2)	Canada
25th	2026	Riyadh	Saudi Arabia
26th	2028	Astana	Kazakhstan

Note: Due to the onset of COVID-19, the 23rd World Petroleum Congress was moved from 2020 to 2021.

== Awards ==
=== The Dewhurst Award ===
This award is named for Institute of Petroleum President Thomas Dewhurst (1881-1973), who organized the first Congress in 1933, and is awarded to individuals who have shown "excellence in the petroleum industry."

- 2023: Amin H. Nasser
- 2021: Daniel Yergin
- 2017: Rex Tillerson
- 2014: Abdullah bin Hamad Al Attiyah
- 2011: Guilherme De Oliveira Estrella
- 2008: Ali Al-Naimi
- 2005: Lord Brown of Madingley
- 2002: Euan Baird
- 2000: Pierre Jacquard
- 1997: Kenneth T. Derr
- 1994: Sir Peter Holmes
- 1991: Abdul Rahman Al-Athel
