= Chad Smith (disambiguation) =

Chad Smith (born October 25, 1961) is an American drummer for the Red Hot Chili Peppers.

Chad Smith may also refer to:

- Chad Smith (athlete) (born 1974), American decathlete
- Chad Smith (soccer) (born 1980), American soccer player
- Chad Smith (politician) (born 1950), Principal Chief of the Cherokee Nation
- Chad Smith (baseball, born 1989), American baseball pitcher
- Chad Smith (baseball, born 1995), American baseball pitcher
- Chad Smith, current president/CEO of the Boston Symphony Orchestra

== See also ==
- Chad (name)
