= Chads (surname) =

Chads is a surname. Notable people with the surname include:

- John Cornell Chads (1793–1854), Royal Marines officer and President of the British Virgin Islands
- Henry Ducie Chads (1788–1868), British admiral
- Henry Chads (1819–1906), British admiral and son of Henry Ducie Chads

== See also ==
- Chad (surname)
