= Horace Dawson =

American diplomat (born 1926)

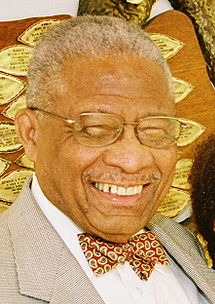
Horace Dawson

Horace Greeley Dawson, Jr. (born January 30, 1926) is an American retired diplomat who served as the United States Ambassador to Botswana.

== Life and career ==
Dawson was born in Augusta, Georgia on January 30, 1926. After graduation from high school, Dawson attended Lincoln University in Pennsylvania for two years before being drafted into the U.S. Army, serving a two-year tour of duty in Europe and the Philippines. Dawson then returned to Lincoln University to finish his studies, earning a B.A. in English in 1949. Dawson went on to study English and comparative literature at Columbia University and received his M.A. the following year.

Dawson began his career as an English teacher at Southern University in Baton Rouge, Louisiana, where he remained three years after earning his M.A. He then went on to teach at North Carolina Central University, where he worked as an associate professor of English and director of public relations. He also received his Ph.D. from the University of Iowa in 1961.

In 1962, Dawson entered the Foreign Service, working as a cultural affairs officer in Uganda and Nigeria, and then as the United States Information Agency Director in Liberia. During his time as Cultural Affairs Officer in Lagos, Nigeria, he served as part-time lecturer at the Institute of Mass Communications at the University of Lagos and served on two committees for the Nigerian Ministry of Education.

From 1973 to 1977, Dawson held a prominent position as the director of all American information and cultural programs in Africa. Subsequently, Dawson became the counselor of embassy for public affairs and the director of American information and cultural programs in the Philippines, where he remained until 1979. That year, he was named ambassador to Botswana by President Jimmy Carter. As ambassador, he worked to end apartheid in South Africa. Returning to the United States in 1983, Dawson remained with the State Department until his retirement in 1989. He then joined the faculty at Howard University and was appointed director of the public affairs program. In 1993, Dawson established the Ralph J. Bunche International Affairs Center at Howard, and in 1997 became the director of that program as well.

Dawson is a member of the Peace Corps Advisory Board, chairman of the Selection Committee for the Franklin H. Williams Memorial Internship Program of the Council on Foreign Relations, and recently ended his term as chairman of the Association of Black American Ambassadors. Listed in Who's Who in America, Dawson has written extensively on the topics of mass media and international affairs. His wife, Lula Cole Dawson, a sociologist and employment specialist, died in 2004. They have two children.

Dawson is a member of Alpha Phi Alpha fraternity. He is the chairman of the fraternity's World Policy Council, a think tank whose purpose is to expand Alpha Phi Alpha's involvement in politics, and social and current policy to encompass international concerns.

Diplomatic posts
Preceded by Donald Norland	U.S. Ambassador to Botswana; 1979– 1982	Succeeded by Theodore Maino
