= Chad Willis =

Chairman and CEO of Texas Energy Holdings

Phillip "Chad" Willis is the chairman and CEO of Texas Energy Holdings and its subsidiaries. Willis holds ownership in companies ranging from software, bomb detection, real estate, restaurants, and sports management. In aggregate, his holdings encompass direct ownership in more than 16 companies that oversee close to 500 employees.

== Early life ==
Willis was born in 1979 in Dallas, Texas, and raised in Mesquite, a suburb of the Dallas/Ft. Worth Metroplex. Willis, the oldest of two siblings, grew up in a working class environment, the son of a school district maintenance worker and a high school mathematics teacher. Willis got his career start at the age of 19 with EarthLink in San Jose, CA. He would later join Winstar Communications and eventually a startup named Everest Broadband where he was bi-coastal between the Los Angeles and New York locations. He attributes his experience at Everest Broadband, as his foundation to learning and understanding the culture of a startup company. As the dot-com world imploded, he returned to North Texas, landing a job at Mid-Continent Oil & Gas, Inc. in 2002. He left the next year to start an Oil and Gas Company ("Texas Energy Holdings, Inc") with co-worker Casey Ladymon.

== Career ==
Willis founded Texas Energy Holdings in 2003. In recent years Texas Energy Holdings has been named to Inc. Magazine's 500/500 list of Fastest-Growing Private Companies in the nation. In 2008, Texas Energy Holding was ranked #186 on the list, #563 in 2009 and then again in 2010 as #385 among the companies on the exclusive 500 list. Dallas Business Journal listed Texas Energy Operations as the 22nd top producer of oil in North Texas in 2011. Willis was featured in Dallas Business Journal's "Who's Who in Energy" in years 2012, 2013, & 2014 along with other distinguished Energy Leaders such as T. Boone Pickens, Trevor Rees-Jones, and Rex Tillerson.

After founding Texas Energy Holdings, Willis also focused in partnering and funding new corporate acquisitions and ventures. In 2007, Willis started Las Vegas based Earth Limos & Buses which is an eco-friendly limo and luxury transportation company. In 2008, Willis partnered with Los Angeles-based defense company Clear Path Technologies, a non-invasive detection devices company that identifies and confirms the presence of explosives, biological agents, narcotics & other illicit substances.

Willis also partnered with Jordan Woy to launch Willis & Woy Sports Group, a full-service sports agency. The firm represents about 50 NFL players, including former Dallas Cowboy Flozell Adams and Green Bay Packer Donald Driver. Willis & Woy Sports Group has negotiated over 2 billion dollars in contracts to date.

Willis is an investor and partner in Stephan Pyles' Concepts, which include San Salvaje, Stephan Pyles, Stampede 66, and Stephan Pyles Catering.

Kingsford Housing is also owned and operated by Willis. A Dallas based private equity and real estate firm.

In December 2013, Willis announced his partnership with software developer Michael Mauerer to launch Retail Cloud Technologies, LLC to produce totally mobile and cloud-based software solutions for retailers.

Willis is in ownership of artisan and handmade "Texas Silver Star Whiskey" and "Lure" a contemporary hair salon in Dallas.

== Media and awards ==
Willis has been featured in numerous publications including Oil & Gas Magazine, D Magazine, Rigzone, Inc., Dallas Morning News, Oil & Gas Investor and Dallas Business Journal's 40 under 40. The Dallas Business Journal listed Texas Energy Operations #22 on their list of Top Oil Production Companies in North Texas. In 2014 Willis was featured in D Magazine's Rising Stars of Oil & Gas

== Philanthropy and scholarship fund ==
Willis is actively involved in multiple non-profit organizations such as Children's Medical Center of Dallas and Alley's House, a program focused on empowering teenage mothers to get off welfare, finish their education, provide for their children and become confident, contributing members of the community. The non-profit organization also awards annual scholarships that are funded by Willis. In 2008, in New York, Willis co-led an event benefiting New York rescue workers with 9/11-related health issues. Willis is also associated with Baja Bound, a non-profit organization that provides affordable service opportunities for groups to build a complete home for Mexican working families in need.

In 2009, Willis was featured in the book "Transformational Philanthropy: Entrepreneurs And Nonprofits" authored by Lisa M. Dietlin.

In 2014, the Chad Willis Foundation was created as a private charitable foundation established to further the philanthropic objectives of Chad Willis towards his support of organizations, charities, and individuals with the resources needed to achieve success and well-being.

== Personal life ==
Willis spends his time between his residences in Dallas and Southern California.
