= Ralph J. Bunche International Affairs Center =

American research institute

Coordinates: 38°55′18″N 77°01′12″W

- Named after: Ralph J. Bunche
- Founded: 1993
- Type: Research Center
- Location: Washington, D.C.
- Director: Dr. Tonija M. Hope
- Key people: Alex T. Johnson; Desirée Cormier Smith
- Parent organization: Howard University
- Website: https://global.howard.edu/

The Ralph J. Bunche International Affairs Center is a research, educational and professional development center for international affairs at Howard University in Washington, D.C. The center is currently headed by Dr. Tonija M. Hope and is an affiliate member of the Association of Professional Schools of International Affairs.

== Founding ==
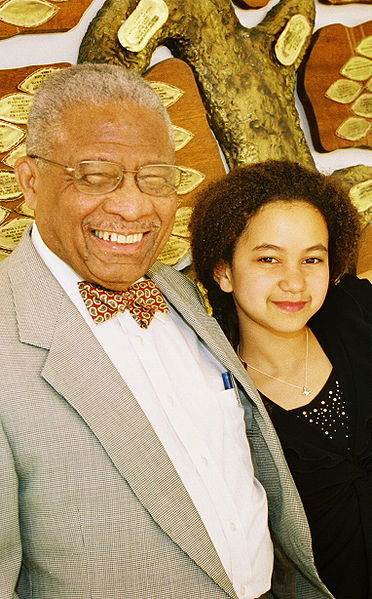
Amb. Horace Dawson, director of the Bunche Center

The center is named for Ralph Bunche, a former Howard professor who became the first person of color to win the Nobel Peace Prize. In 1963, he was the recipient of the Presidential Medal of Freedom.

Howard University established the Bunche Center in 1993 with a grant from the W.K. Kellogg Foundation. It currently coordinates study abroad programs for Howard students, sponsors "Diplomats in Residence" and aims to place Howard students in US embassies worldwide. The former U.S. Ambassador to Botswana, Horace G. Dawson, Jr., previously served as the director.

== Programs and Initiatives ==
The Rangel Program is a collaborative effort between Howard University and the U.S. Department of State that seeks to attract and prepare outstanding young people for careers as diplomats in the U.S. Foreign Service. The program seeks individuals interested in helping to shape a freer, more secure and prosperous world through formulating, representing, and implementing U.S. foreign policy. The Program encourages the application of members of minority groups historically underrepresented in the Foreign Service and those with financial need.

There are two major components to the Rangel Program: the Charles B. Rangel International Affairs Fellowship, which provides support for graduate school, professional development, and entry into the U.S. Foreign Service, and an undergraduate International Affairs Summer Enrichment Program that provides undergraduates with the opportunity to enhance their skills, knowledge and understanding about U.S. foreign policy.
