= Chad Norman =

Canadian poet

Chad Norman (born c. 1958) is a Canadian poet from Nova Scotia. He was the recipient of the 1992 Gwendolyn MacEwen Memorial Award For Poetry, and his work has been featured in Canadian literary publications for over 40 years.

== Biography ==
Norman was born c. 1958 in Armstrong, British Columbia. He grew up in Vancouver before moving to Truro in 2003. Norman published his first poem at the age of 24. In 1992, he was awarded the Gwendolyn MacEwen Memorial Award For Poetry for his poem Watch Hawk.

In 2016, Norman travelled to Denmark by invitation of the Nordic Association of Canadian Studies to present his poetry and discuss other Canadian poets. In September 2018, he travelled to Wales, Scotland, Ireland, and Northern Ireland to share Canadian poetry. He was denied funding for the tour from the Canada Council for the Arts and Arts Nova Scotia, and covered the cost himself. Across 15 stops, Norman read the works of his preferred Canadian poets and some of his own writing.

Norman's poetry has been featured in Canadian literary publications for over 40 years. One of Norman's poems was chosen for inclusion in a lunar time capsule in 2024. The Vagabond Lunar Collection, assembled by Mark Lipman, is affiliated with the Lunar Codex project which aims to send artwork, poetry, and literature into space.

== Publications ==
- Norman, Chad (1997). The Breath of One. Victoria, BC: Ekstasis Editions. ISBN 978-1-8968-6018-3. OCLC 41035153.
- — (2001). These are my Elders: Poems of Tribute and Thanks. Fredericton, NB: Broken Jaw Press. ISBN 978-1-8966-4774-6. OCLC 46992070.
- — (2008). Going Mad for the Love of Sanity. New Denver, BC: Chameleon Fire Editions. ISBN 978-0-9687-6737-5. OCLC 259246838.
- — (2012). Hugging the Huge Father. Truro, NS: Grant Block Press. ISBN 978-0-9868-5000-4. OCLC 978219097.
- — (2013). Masstown. Windsor, ON: Black Moss Press. ISBN 978-0-8875-3519-2. OCLC 842879312.
- — (2015). Desjardins, Meghan (ed.). Learning to Settle Down. Windsor, ON: Black Moss Press. ISBN 978-0-8875-3552-9. OCLC 910393929.
- — (2016). Selected and New Poems. Oakville, ON: Mosaic Press. ISBN 978-1-7716-1234-0. OCLC 958271706.
- — (2020). Mirolla, Michael (ed.). Squall: Poems in the Voice of Mary Shelley. Illustrated by Judith S. Bauer. Commentary by George Elliott Clarke. Toronto, ON: Guernica Editions. ISBN 978-1-7718-3517-6. OCLC 1110009315.
- — (2024). Parental Forest. Ace of Swords Publishing. ISBN 978-1-9904-9620-2. OCLC 1492904310.
