= Charles B. Rangel International Affairs Fellowship =

The Charles B. Rangel International Affairs Fellowship Program is a fellowship program that provides funding for graduate students as they prepare academically and professionally to enter the United States Foreign Service.

== History ==
Launched to help promote greater diversity in the U.S. Foreign Service, the Rangel Fellowship Program was announced in 2002 by Secretary of State Colin Powell, Congressman Charles B. Rangel, and the President of Howard University, H. Patrick Swygert. In the early years of the program, the U.S. Congress provided an appropriation for the program, and its early operations were supported by the Department of State and contributions by the John D. and Catherine T. MacArthur Foundation and the Una Chapman Cox Foundation.

== Program components ==
The program is managed by the Ralph J. Bunche International Affairs Center at Howard University and is funded by a grant from the U.S. Department of State.

The Rangel Program offers forty-five graduate fellowships annually to outstanding seniors and college graduates who want to join the U.S. Foreign Service. The fellowships help finance two-year graduate programs and provide two paid summer internship opportunities, one on Capitol Hill and the second at a U.S. embassy.

Like the Thomas R. Pickering Fellowship Program, the Rangel Fellowship Program guarantees a five-year contract in the Foreign Service to successful Fellows. Rangel Fellows also receive mentoring from Foreign Service Officers throughout the duration of the program.

Rangel Fellows attend a variety of graduate schools across the United States, including the Harvard Kennedy School, the Princeton School of Public and International Affairs, the Cornell Institute for Public Affairs, the Fletcher School of Law and Diplomacy, the Lyndon B. Johnson School, the Edmund A. Walsh School of Foreign Service, the Paul H. Nitze School of Advanced International Studies, the School of International Service, the School of International and Public Affairs, the Gerald R. Ford School of Public Policy, and the Elliott School of International Affairs.

== See also ==
- Thomas R. Pickering Foreign Affairs Fellowship
- United States Foreign Service
- Foreign Service Officer
- African Americans in foreign policy
