= Carl Chadd =

British puppeteer

Carl Chadd is a British puppeteer.

Chadd is best known for his collaborations with puppeteer Phil Fletcher. He has assisted with Fletcher’s puppet company, The Gluvets. He has performed in several of their shows and made several guest appearances a puppet festivals. Chadd also performed in an episode of TV series Scoop on CBBC as a puppeteer. The show starred his partner, Phil Fletcher, as Hacker T. Dog.

He once performed Gluvets tribute to Jim Henson, featuring Kermit the Frog and Miss Piggy. The rights of the characters had been taken up by Disney, who threatened to sue them if they didn’t cut out Miss Piggy and Kermit. Disney said that they were submitting scripts for Muppet shows to Disney, Promoter, Paul Bridson said this was not the case. After two shows in Irvine and Stirling Disney lawyers discovered that they asked the estate of Jim Henson, the late Muppet creator, last September for permission but were told the rights had been sold to Disney and were misled. They case was closed but Fletcher still cut out Kermit and Miss Piggy, he said “'It's just a frog and a pig but we can't afford to take on Disney.”
