= Thomas R. Pickering Foreign Affairs Fellowship =

American graduate school fellowship program

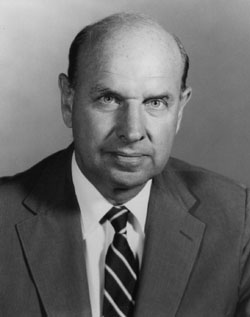
Ambassador Thomas R. Pickering

The Thomas R. Pickering Foreign Affairs Fellowship Program is an American graduate school fellowship program that provides funding for graduate students as they prepare academically and professionally to enter the U.S. Foreign Service.

The fellowship seeks to recruit talented students in academic programs relevant to international affairs, political and economic analysis, administration, management, and science policy. The goal is to attract outstanding students from all ethnic, racial, and social backgrounds who have an interest in pursuing a Foreign Service career in the U.S. Department of State. The Program develops a source of trained men and women from academic disciplines representing the skill needs of the department, who are dedicated to representing America's interests abroad.

The fellowship is funded by the U.S. Department of State and administered by The Washington Center for Internships and Academic Seminars and the Woodrow Wilson National Fellowship Foundation. The fellowship award can be applied to tuition, room, board, and mandatory fees during funded years of study, with reimbursement for books and for travel (one round trip per academic year, up to a set maximum amount). For the undergraduate Fellowship, the funded years are the senior year of undergraduate study and the first year of graduate study. For the graduate Fellowship, the funded years are two years of graduate study. Fellows must commit to pursuing a graduate degree in business administration, economics, public policy, international studies, or another relevant field, at one of the graduate schools participating in the program. Participating graduate schools typically provide financial support in the second year of graduate study based on need. Fellows meet annually in Washington, D.C., for a program orientation.

== History ==
The Pickering Fellowship was established in 1992 as the U.S. Department of State Foreign Affairs Fellowship Program.

The program was renamed the Thomas R. Pickering Foreign Affairs Fellowship Program, in honor of Thomas R. Pickering, a Career Ambassador in the Foreign Service who served as U.S. Ambassador to Nigeria, El Salvador, Israel, India, Russia, and the United Nations over the course of his career.

== Program components ==
Financial award

The Department of State, through The Washington Center for Internships and Academic Seminars, provides financial support of up to $37,500 annually for actual expenses for the senior year of college and the first year of graduate study in the case of the undergraduate fellowship and for both years of graduate study in the case of the graduate fellowship. This funding will be applied towards costs such as: tuition, room, board, books, mandatory fees, and travel from the Fellow's residence to the academic institution.

Two paid summer internships

Fellows receive stipends during their participation in two paid summer internships: one in Washington, D.C. at the Department of State the summer immediately following their first funded year of study and one overseas at a U.S. embassy during the summer immediately following their second funded year of study.

Mentoring

Fellows will have access to Foreign Service Officers and mentors during the program.

Testing

Fellows must meet U.S. Department of State entry requirements for Foreign Service Officers.

Contractual Agreement

Each successful candidate is obligated to a minimum of five years of service in an appointment as a Foreign Service Officer. Candidates must be able to obtain medical, security and suitability clearances in order to remain in the program. Candidates who do not successfully complete the Program and meet Foreign Service entry requirements may be subject to a reimbursement obligation to the U.S. Department of State.

== Statutory information ==
- PUBLIC LAW 101–246, 101st Congress, 104 STAT.42 Section 47

"The Secretary of State may make grants to post-secondary educational institutions or students for the purpose of increasing the level of knowledge and awareness of and interest in employment with the Foreign Service, consistent with section 105 of the Foreign Service Act of 1980. To the extent possible, the Secretary shall give special emphasis to promoting such knowledge and awareness of, and interest in employment with the Foreign Service among students. Any grants awarded shall be made pursuant to regulations to be established by the Secretary of State, which shall provide for a limit on the size of any specific grant and, regarding any grants to individuals, shall ensure that no grant recipient receives and amount of grants from one or more Federal programs which in the aggregate would exceed the cost of his or her education, and shall require satisfactory educational progress by grantees as a condition of eligibility for continued receipt of grant funds".

== See also ==
- Charles B. Rangel International Affairs Fellowship
