= Richard Chadd =

British ecologist (died 2021)

Richard Chadd FLS (died 5 November 2021) was a British ecologist and biologist.

== Biography ==
Chadd was a freshwater ecologist. He worked as a senior environmental monitoring officer with the Environment Agency. He was an active member and recorder with the Lincolnshire Naturalists' Union, serving as its recorder of fresherwater invertebrates from 2003 onwards and as its president in both 2005 and 2020. At the time of his death he was a board member of the Freshwater Biological Association and of The Riverfly Partnership. Chadd was a Fellow of the Linnean Society.

== Select publications ==
- Dunbar, M.J., Pedersen, M.L., Cadman, D., Extence, C., Waddingham, J., Chadd, R., and Larsen, S.E. 2010. "River discharge and local-scale physical habitat influence macroinvertebrate LIFE scores". Freshwater Biology 55: 226-242. doi:10.1111/j.1365-2427.2009.02306.x
- Dunbar, M.J., Warren, M., Extence, C., Baker, L., Cadman, D., Mould, D.J., Hall, J. and Chadd, R. 2010. "Interaction between macroinvertebrates, discharge and physical habitat in upland rivers". Aquatic Conservation: Marine and Freshwater Ecosystems 20: S31-S44. doi:10.1002/aqc.1089
- Mathers, K.L., Chadd, R.P., Dunbar, M.J., Extence, C.A., Reeds, J., Rice, S.P., and Wood, P.J. 2016. "The long-term effects of invasive signal crayfish (Pacifastacus leniusculus) on instream macroinvertebrate communities", Science of the Total Environment 556: 207-2018.
- Chadd, R. and Eversham, B. 2010. "Other invertebrates", in Maclean, N. (ed) Silent Summer: The State of Wildlife in Britain and Ireland. Cambridge University Press.
- Chadd, R. 2010 "Assessment of Aquatic Invertebrates", in Biological Monitoring in Freshwater Habitats, 63-72.
