= Chad Johnson (actor) =

American adult film actor and model (born 1960)

- Born: John J. Campbell; February 12, 1960 (age 66); West Palm Beach, Florida, U. S.
- Other name: Cad Johnson
- Occupations: Actor; Model; Hairdresser
- Years active: 1984 – 2009
- Agent: Falcon Studios
- Partner: Dane Ford (former)

John J. Campbell (born February 12, 1960), known by the stage names Chad Johnson and Cad Johnson, is an American adult film actor and model who worked in gay pornography from the early 1980s through the late 2000s. His muscular build and body hair contrasted with the slender, clean-shaven performers common in the industry during the 1980s. He was later inducted into the GAYVN Hall of Fame.

== Early life ==
He was born in West Palm Beach, Florida, and grew up on the Atlantic coast of the state. At age 19, he was approached on a street in West Hollywood, California, by adult film director William Higgins, who asked if he wanted to appear in films. Campbell, who had no prior knowledge of the industry, accepted for financial reasons.

== Career ==
=== 1980s ===
Campbell made his film debut under the name Chad Johnson in the 1984 William Higgins film Pipeline. He later stated that he felt violated because the director required him to perform in a receptive role, and noted that his discomfort was visible on screen. His only other film during this initial period was the 1985 Catalina Video release The Pizza Boy: He Delivers. Following these projects, he left the industry.

At age 23, needing to pay off a car loan, Campbell returned to adult films. He instructed his agent that he would only perform as a dominant partner. Over the next six months, his popularity grew and he performed in approximately twelve titles, including Perfect Ten, Delicious (1987), and Too Big for His Britches (1987).

During the mid-to-late 1980s, gay adult media typically featured young, blonde, slender, and clean-shaven actors. Campbell's look—which included dark hair, body hair, a rugged facial appearance, and a muscular frame—differed from the standard style of the era but developed a fan audience.

=== Print modeling ===
Alongside his film roles, Chad worked in print media during the 1980s and 1990s. He modeled for physique photography and appeared in layouts, centerfolds, and covers for gay erotica magazines. Because of his appearance, publishers used his image to target audiences interested in hairy, muscular models. This print work kept him visible to consumers during subsequent multi-year absences from film sets.

=== 1990s hiatus ===
Around 1990, after filming Cruisin' West Hollywood, he left the adult industry because of a long-term relationship. During this ten-year hiatus, he returned to school and trained as a hairdresser, working in the hair design industry.

=== 2000s comeback and retirement ===
Following the end of his relationship, an adult film fan showed Johnson copies of his 1980s work. At age 40, Chad contacted talent agent Johnny Johnston to return to film production.

During his comeback, he performed in 14 films, including Man Academy, Tulsa County Line (2001), Don't Ask, Don't Tell!, and Echoes. After his return, Campbell stated that the economics of the industry had changed since the 1980s, arguing that modern studios paid lower rates and treated actors as disposable assets.

Chad's final film roles were released in 2009. After retiring from adult films, he remained in Southern California and planned to train for a career as a gemologist.

== Personal life ==
In the late 1980s, Campbell met adult film actor Dane Ford on a set, and they began an 11-year relationship. The two co-starred in films such as Break In & Enter (1985) and Delicious (1987), and appeared together in magazine layouts. Production companies frequently paired them due to the physical contrast between Campbell's dark, hairy build and Ford's slender appearance. Ford convinced Chad to leave the adult industry around 1990 to focus on their relationship.

Campbell lived in Redondo Beach, California, before moving to the broader Los Angeles area.

== Filmography ==
=== Film ===
| Year | Title | Role | Notes |
|---|---|---|---|
| 1984 | Pipeline | Chad Johnson | Debut |
| 1984 | Big, Bigger, Best | Chad Johnson | |
| 1985 | Break In & Enter | Chad Johnson | Co-starring with Dane Ford |
| 1985 | Pizza Boy: He Delivers | Chad Johnson | |
| 1986 | Beach Ballers | Chad Johnson | |
| 1986 | Cashload | Chad Johnson | |
| 1986 | Down To His Knee | Chad Johnson | |
| 1986 | Full House | Chad Johnson | |
| 1986 | Man Size | Chad Johnson | |
| 1986 | Perfect Ten | Chad Johnson | |
| 1986 | Physical Education | Chad Johnson | |
| 1986 | Tall Tales | Chad Johnson | |
| 1987 | Down For The Count | Chad-Wrestler | |
| 1987 | Delicious | Chad Johnson | Co-starring with Dane Ford |
| 1987 | Pounder | Chad Johnson | |
| 1987 | Too Big For His Britches | Mr. Sawyer | |
| 1988 | Bulge: Mass Appeal | Chad Johnson | |
| 1988 | California Dreamin' | Chad Johnson | |
| 1988 | Eagle Pack 6 | Chad Johnson | |
| 1988 | Flogging The Sausage | Chad Johnson | |
| 1988 | Lyin' King | Chad Johnson | |
| 1989 | Uncut Dreams | Chad Johnson | |
| 1990 | Cruisin' West Hollywood | Chad Johnson | Co-starring with Dane Ford |
| 1990 | Hot, Hung and Hairy | Chad Johnson | |
| 1991 | Catalina Down and Dirty | Chad Johnson | |
| 1994 | Hot and Hung 1 | Chad Johnson | |
| 1997 | Addicted to Dick | Chad Johnson | |
| 1998 | Directors' Best William Higgins | Chad Johnson | |
| 2000 | All About Sex | Chad Johnson | |
| 2000 | Best of Jason Branch | Chad Johnson | |
| 2000 | Best of Jason Branch (II) | Chad Johnson | |
| 2000 | Colossal Cocks | Chad Johnson | |
| 2000 | Demolition Daddy | Construction Worker | |
| 2000 | Don't Ask Don't Tell | Soldier | |
| 2000 | Echoes | Hockey Player | |
| 2000 | Groom For Hire | Chad Johnson | |
| 2000 | Man Academy: Where Boys Grow Up! | President Reiger | |
| 2001 | Big As They Come 3 | Chad Johnson | |
| 2001 | The Waking | Orderly | |
| 2001 | Joint: A Penile Institution | Chad Johnson | |
| 2001 | Men at Work | Chad Johnson | |
| 2001 | Tulsa County Line | Chad Johnson | |
| 2002 | Man Academy 2: Rites of Passage | Chad Johnson | |
| 2002 | Seven Deadly Sins: Sloth | The Drifter | |
| 2002 | Men at Work | Chad Johnson | |
| 2002 | White Trash | Trucker | |
| 2003 | Giant: MSR's Big Dick Sex Club 1 | Chad Johnson | |
| 2005 | Latin Love | Chad Johnson | |
| 2005 | Seven Deadly Sins: Redemption | Chad Johnson | |
| 2006 | Big As They Come II | Chad Johnson | |
| 2006 | Quickies: My Cock His Ass | Chad Johnson | |
| 2007 | Best of Johnny Brosnan | Chad Johnson | |
| 2008 | Man to Man | Chad Johnson | |
| 2009 | My Brother Loves Dick | Chad Johnson | |

== Awards and nominations ==
| Year | Award | Category | Work | Result | Ref |
|---|---|---|---|---|---|
| 2001 | Grabby Awards | Best Group Sex Scene | Echoes | Won | |
| 2001 | GayVN Awards | Best Group Scene | Echoes | Nominated | |
| 2001 | GayVN Awards | Best Threesome | Don't Ask, Don't Tell! | Nominated | |
| 2001 | Grabby Awards | Best Three-Way Sex Scene | Don't Ask, Don't Tell! | Nominated | |
| 2002 | GayVN Awards | Best Threesome | Big as They Come III | Nominated | |
| 2002 | Grabby Awards | Best Three-Way Sex Scene | Big as They Come III | Nominated | |
| 2002 | GayVN Awards | GAYVN Hall of Fame | Contribution to Porn Gay Cinema | Won | |
