= Chadwick (given name) =

Chadwick, often shortened to Chad, is a masculine given name. Notable people with the name include:

- Chadwick Boseman (1976–2020), American actor
- Chadwick Gardner, lead vocalist for American band Kings Kaleidoscope
- Chadwick A. Tolman (born 1938), American chemist
- Chadwick Tromp (born 1995), Aruban baseball player
- Chadwick Walton (born 1985), West Indies cricketer from Jamaica

== See also ==
- Chad (name)
