= Chad Person =

American contemporary artist (born 1978)

Chad Person (born 1978) is an American contemporary artist primarily known for his sculptural and collage works.

== Work ==
His project: RECESS (resource exhaustion crisis evacuation safety shelter) is an example of his conceptual approach. In this ongoing project, Person undertakes a DIY conversion of a swimming pool into a bomb shelter / survival bunker, highlighting the potentially negative outcomes of maintaining a hardcore survivalist mentality. The intentionally controversial subject matter in project RECESS led Asylum to label Person "the most paranoid man in America".

In 2010, one of his sculptures was seized from Mark Moore Gallery by the Bureau of Alcohol, Tobacco, Firearms and Explosives pending allegations that it was an illegally manufactured and trafficked firearm.

Person is also known for his collages that used sliced up American dollar bills. One such work, Yixing Teapot and iPod (from the series Worshipping Mammon: An Exploration of Value), is in the collection of the New Mexico Museum of Art.

His collaboration with Hiroshi Fuji was featured in the Site Santa Fe Biennial in 2008.

In 2015 he presented Prospector, a forty-foot high inflatable sculpture, in downtown Denver Colorado.
