= John Chadd =

English cricketer

Cricket information
- Batting: Right-handed
- Bowling: Right arm off-break

Career statistics
Competition	First-class
Matches	2
Runs scored	4
Batting average	4.00
100s/50s	0/0
Top score	4
Balls bowled	126
Wickets	2
Bowling average	49.00
5 wickets in innings	0
10 wickets in match	0
Best bowling	2/84
Catches/stumpings	1/–
- Source: Cricinfo, 14 April 2023

John Etheridge Chadd (born 27 October 1933) is an English former cricketer who played two first-class matches for Worcestershire, one in 1955 and the other the following year.

He took two wickets, both in the first innings against Oxford University in 1956: lower-order batsmen Aubrey Walshe and Victor Clube. However, he conceded 84 runs from the 15 overs he sent down in that innings, and he never played first-class cricket again.
