= Chad Brown =

Chad Brown may refer to:

- Chad Brown (basketball) (born 1996), American basketball player in the Israeli Basketball Premier League
- Chad Brown (minister) (c. 1600–1650), early American Baptist minister, co-founder of Rhode Island
- Chad Brown (linebacker) (born 1970), former NFL linebacker
- Chad Brown (defensive end) (born 1971), former NFL defensive end
- Chad Brown (American football official) (1947–2016), NFL official
- Chad Brown (horse trainer) (born 1978), American racehorse trainer
- Chad Brown (poker player) (1961–2014), American poker player
- Chad Brown (politician) (born 1970), member of the Louisiana House of Representatives
- Chad Brown (soccer) (born 1975), American soccer player
