= Chad M. Rienstra =

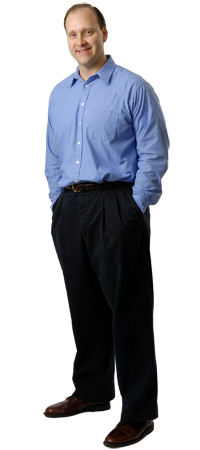
- Education: Massachusetts Institute of Technology, Macalester College
- Scientific career
- Fields: Biochemistry
- Workplaces: University of Wisconsin at Madison
- Website: biochem.wisc.edu/people/rienstra/

Chad M. Rienstra is a Evelyn Mercer Professor in Biochemical Sciences in the Department of Biochemistry at the University of Wisconsin at Madison. He formerly was a tenured professor at the University of Illinois Urbana-Champaign where he joined the Department of Chemistry in 2002 as assistant professor, was promoted to associate professor with tenure in 2008, and was promoted to professor in 2013.

He is a specialist in solid state nuclear magnetic resonance, especially as applied to proteins. His most heavily cited article has been cited 1,864 times according to Google Scholar. Sixty of his papers have been cited 60 times or more.
