= Yung Lean discography =

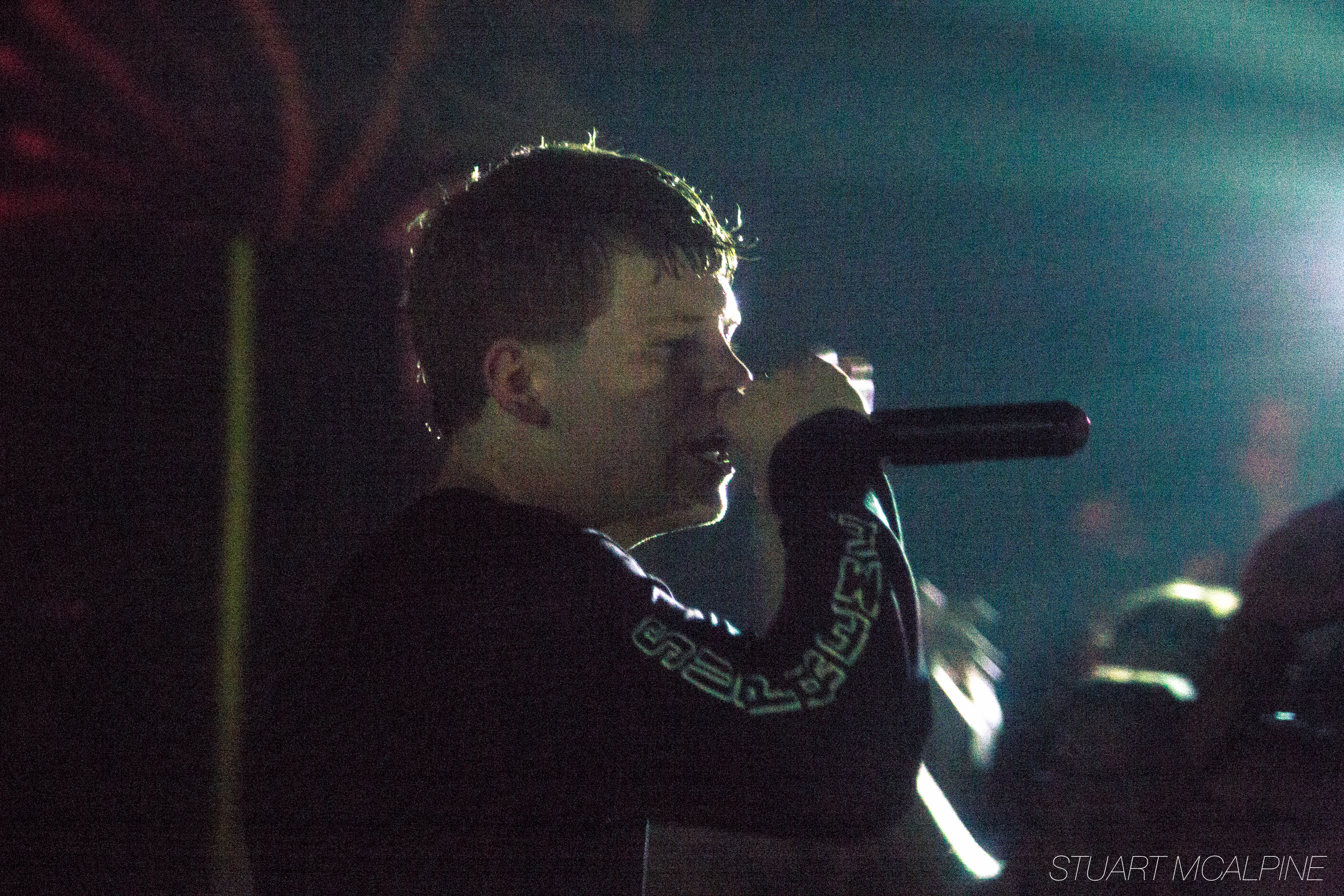
- Yung Lean performing in July 2014.
- Studio albums: 8
- EPs: 6
- Mixtapes: 4
- Live albums: 1
- Compilation albums: 1
- Music videos: 44

Swedish rapper Yung Lean has released eight studio albums, six EPs and four mixtapes.

== Albums ==
=== Studio albums ===
List of studio albums, with year released and chart positions
Title	Album details	Peak chart positions				
Title	Album details	SWE	NZ Heat.	US R&B	US Rap	US Heat.
Unknown Memory (as Yung Lean)	Released: 23 September 2014; Label: Sky Team, YEAR0001 (Rr.), Ormolycka (Cs.); Format: CD, LP, cassette, digital download, streaming	—	—	36	22	19
Warlord (as Yung Lean)	Released: 25 February 2016; Label: YEAR0001, Ormolycka (Cs.); Format: LP, cassette, digital download, streaming	—	—	—	—	—
Stranger (as Yung Lean)	Released: 10 November 2017; Label: YEAR0001; Format: CD, 2×LP, digital download, streaming	18	7	—	—	—
Nectar (as Jonatan Leandoer96)	Released: 25 January 2019; Label: YEAR0001; Format: LP, digital download, streaming	—	—	—	—	—
Starz (as Yung Lean)	Released: 15 May 2020; Label: YEAR0001; Format: CD, 2×LP, LP, digital download, streaming	39	—	—	—	—
Blodhundar & Lullabies (as Jonatan Leandoer96)	Released: 21 December 2020; Label: World Affairs; Format: digital download, streaming	—	—	—	—	—
Sugar World (as Jonatan Leandoer96)	Released: 3 February 2023; Label: YEAR0001; Format: digital download, streaming	—	—	—	—	—
Jonatan (as Yung Lean)	Released: 2 May 2025; Label: World Affairs; Format: digital download, streaming	28	—	—	—	—

=== Collaborative albums ===
List of collaborative albums with year released
Title	Album details
Drabbad av sjukdom (with Gud as Död Mark)	Released: 10 November 2016; Label: YEAR0001; Format: LP, digital download, streaming
Död Mark 4Evigt (with Gud as Död Mark)	Released: 15 September 2023; Label: YEAR0001; Format: digital download, streaming
Psykos (with Bladee)	Released: 13 March 2024; Label: World Affairs; Format: digital download, streaming

=== Compilation albums ===
List of compilation albums with year released
Title	Album details
Chapter 1 (as Yung Lean)	Released: 2018; Label: YEAR0001; Format: LP

=== Live albums ===
List of live albums with year released
Title	Album details
Live in Stockholm (with Gud as Död Mark)	Released: 4 October 2019; Label: YEAR0001; Format: LP

=== Mixtapes ===
List of mixtapes with year released
Title	Album details	Peak
Title	Album details	SWE
Unknown Death 2002 (as Yung Lean)	Released: 9 July 2013; Label: Mishka NYC; Format: CD, LP, cassette, digital download, streaming	—
Frost God (as Yung Lean)	Released: 14 December 2016; Label: YEAR0001; Format: LP, digital download, streaming	—
Poison Ivy (as Yung Lean)	Released: 2 November 2018; Label: YEAR0001; Format: LP, cassette, digital download, streaming	44
Stardust (as Yung Lean)	Released: 8 April 2022; Label: World Affairs; Format: digital download, streaming	21

=== Demotapes ===
Title	Album details
Demos Cassette (with Gud as Död Mark)	Released: 2017; Label: YEAR0001; Format: Cassette

== Extended plays ==
List of extended plays with selected details
Title	Details
Lavender EP (as Yung Lean)	Released: 16 August 2013; Label: Revenue, YEAR0001 (Rr.); Format: LP, digital download, streaming
New Era (with Baba Stiltz as Metal Storm)	Released: 6 January 2015; Label: Self-released; Format: Digital download, streaming
Psychopath Ballads (as Jonatan Leandoer127)	Released: 19 December 2016; Label: YEAR0001; Format: Cassette, digital download, streaming
Katla (as Jonatan Leandoer127)	Released: 12 July 2017; Label: YEAR0001; Format: digital download, streaming
Crash Bandicoot & Ghostface / Shyguy (as Yung Lean)	Released: 6 July 2018; Label: YEAR0001; Format: Digital download, streaming
Total Eclipse (as Yung Lean)	Released 6 March 2019; Label: YEAR0001; Format: Digital download, streaming
Evil World (with Bladee)	Released 10 October 2025; Label: Trash Island; Format: Digital download, streaming

== Singles ==
=== As lead artist ===
List of singles as lead artist
Title	Year	Peak chart positions	Album
Title	Year	SWE Heat.	Album
"Marble Phone" (with Kreayshawn)	2013	—	Non-album singles
"Kyoto"	2013	—	Non-album singles
"Yoshi City"	2014	—	Unknown Memory
"Crystal Clear Ice"	2015	—	Adult Swim Singles Program 2015
"Hoover" / "How U Like Me Now?" (with Thaiboy Digital)	2016	—	Warlord
"Af1s" (with Ecco2k)	2016	—	Warlord
"Red Bottom Sky"	2017	—	Stranger
"Hunting My Own Skin"	2017	—	Stranger
"Skimask"	2017	—	Stranger
"King Cobra" (with Thaiboy Digital)	2018	—	Non-album singles
"Like Me" (with Lil Dude)	2018	—	Non-album singles
"Creep Creeps"	2018	—	Non-album singles
"First Class" (with Thaiboy Digital)	2019	—	Non-album singles
"Blue Plastic"	2019	—	Non-album singles
"Boylife in EU"	2020	—	Starz
"Violence"	2020	—	Starz
"Pikachu"	2020	—	Starz
"Opium Dreams" (with Bladee)	2020	—	Non-album singles
"Chandelier"	2021	—	Non-album singles
"Trip"	2022	—	Stardust
"Forever Yung"	2025	—	Jonatan
"Babyface Maniacs"	2025	—	Jonatan
"Robotboy"	2026	—	Non-album single
"That's It" (featuring Metro Boomin and Future)	2026	18	Grand Theft Auto VI: The Album

=== As featured artist ===
List of singles as a featured artist
Title	Year	Other artist(s)	Peak chart positions				Album
Title	Year	Other artist(s)	SWE	LTU Air.	UK	US	Album
"To Me"	2016	Luckaleannn	—	—	—	—	Non-album singles
"No Mercy"	2017	Yung Bans	—	—	—	—	Non-album singles
"Gotham City"	2017	Bladee	—	—	—	—	Non-album singles
"Red Velvet"	2019	Bladee	—	—	—	—	Non-album singles
"Evigheten"	2020	Abidaz	—	—	—	—	Non-album singles
"Storm"	2026	Gener8ion	5	79	37	93	Love & Tears
"—" denotes items which were not released in that country or failed to chart.

== Other charted songs ==
List of songs, with selected chart positions, showing year charted and album name
Title	Year	Peak chart positions								Certifications	Album
Title	Year	SWE Heat.	AUS	CAN	FRA	US	US R&B /HH	US Rap	WW	Certifications	Album
"Ginseng Strip 2002"	2013	4	—	55	—	—	—	—	47	BPI: Silver; RMNZ: Platinum	Lavender EP
"Bliss" (with FKA Twigs)	2022	18	—	—	—	—	—	—	—		Stardust
"Paradise Lost" (featuring Ant Wan)	2022	14	—	—	—	—	—	—	—		Stardust
"Parasail" (Travis Scott featuring Yung Lean and Dave Chappelle)	2023	—	91	46	92	53	23	22	55		Utopia
"I'm Your Dirt, I'm Your Love"	2025	20	—	—	—	—	—	—	—		Jonatan
"—" denotes a recording that did not chart or was not released in that territory.

== Music videos ==
=== As lead artist ===
List of music videos, showing year released and director. List does not include street videos.
Title	Year	Director(s)
"Nekobasu"	2013	Bladee
"Greygoose"	2013	Yung Lean
"Ginseng Strip 2002"	2013	Emrik Meshesha
"Plastic G-Shock"	2013	Emrik Meshesha
"5th Element"	2013	Emrik Meshesha
"Hurt"	2013	Ossian Melin
"Solarflare"	2013	Ossian Melin
"Kyoto"	2013	Rigel Kilston
"Plastic Boy"	2013	Ecco2k
"Gatorade"	2014	Emrik Meshesha
"Motorola"	2014	Emrik Meshesha
"Lucifer Love"	2014	
"Yoshi City"	2014	Marcus Söderlund
"Emails"	2014	Georg Lewark, Younes Labdi, Michael Obenland
"Sandman"	2014	Bladee
"Volt"	2014	PWR studio
"Blinded"	2014	Chatline Worldwide (Emrik Meshesha)
"Diamonds"	2014	Marcus Söderlund
"Tokyo Drift"	2015	Motice Vision, Kasai Yusuke
"Hoover"	2015	Leo Siboni
"Miami Ultras"	2016	Marcus Söderlund, Yung Lean
"Afghanistan"	2016	Kevin Wright
"Sippin"	2016	Toinne
"Highway Patrol"	2016	Grear Patterson
"Eye Contact"	2016	Bodycam
"Hennessy & Sailor Moon"	2016	Léo Siboni
"Metallic Intuition"	2017	Suzie & Leo
"Red Bottom Sky"	2017	Marcus Söderlund, Yung Lean
"Happy Feet"	2018	Marcus Söderlund, Yung Lean
"Friday the 13th"	2018	Suzie & Leo
"Blue Plastic"	2019	Suzie & Leo
"Boylife in EU"	2020	PWR
"Violence + Pikachu"	2020	Marcus Söderlund, Yung Lean
"My Agenda"	2020	Suzie & Leo
"Opium Dreams"	2020	
"Outta My Head"	2020	Anton Tammi
"Butterfly Paralyzed"	2020	
"Summer Rain"	2021	Louise Tungården & Otis Huss
"Chandelier"	2021	Gus Reichwald
"Trip"	2022	Gus Reichwald
"Bliss"	2022	Aidan Zamiri
"Paradise Lost"	2022	Marcus Söderlund
"Waterfall"	2022	Marcus Söderlund
"Victorious"	2023	Aidan Zamiri
"Forever Yung"	2025	Aidan Zamiri
"Babyface Maniacs"	2025	Suzie & Leo
"Inferno" (with Bladee)	2025	Gus Reichwald
"Advent" (with Bladee)	2025	Gus Reichwald

=== As featured artist ===
List of music videos, showing year released and director
Title	Year	Director(s)
"It's Sad Boy" (Yung Gleesh featuring Yung Lean)	2014	Will Hoopes
"Molly2" (Crack Ignaz featuring Yung Lean and Bladee)	2014	VJESUS
"Blood Rain" (Bladee featuring Yung Lean)	2014	Bladee
"El Chapo" (Ballout featuring Yung Lean)	2016	Northstar
"Ten" (Adamn Killa featuring Yung Lean)	2016	Rigel Kilston
"Schemin" (Uli K featuring Yung Lean)	2016	Ecco2k
"Lordship" (Bladee featuring Yung Lean)	2018	Stegfors
"Red Velvet" (Bladee featuring Yung Lean)	2019	Joe Ward, Nile HQ
"First Class" (Thaiboy Digital featuring Yung Lean)	2019	PWR Studio
"Airwalker" (Woesum featuring Yung Lean & Bladee)	2021	Guz Reichwald
"Storm" (Gener8ion featuring Yung Lean)	2026	Romain Gavras

== Guest appearances ==
List of non-single guest appearances, with other performing artists, showing year released and album name
Title	Year	Other artist(s)	Album
"Bladeecity"	2013	Bladee	—N/a
"ESKALATOR LUV MUSIK"	2013	Lofty305	Haunted Clothes 3
"Flexin'"	2013	Robb Banks, SpaceGhostPurrp	—N/a
"Pixelated Tears"	2013	Bones	Creep
"Bitch Named Bitch"	2013	Denzel Curry	—N/a
"It's Sad Boy"	2013	Yung Gleesh	Your Favorite Rapper's Favorite Rapper
"Molly2"	2014	Crack Ignaz	—N/a
"Jug Man"	2014	Adamn Killa	—N/a
"Blood Rain"	2014	Bladee	—N/a
"Art Show, Pt. 2"	2014	Luckaleannn	—N/a
"Watchu Wanna"	2014	Prada Mane	Blue Prada
"Devlish Paradise"	2014	Thaiboy Digital	—N/a
"Diamonds"	2014	Thaiboy Digital	Tiger
"Like This"	2015	Ashley All Day	—N/a
"F'd Up"	2015	Thaiboy Digital	—N/a
"Wanna Smoke"	2015	Ballout	—N/a
"Creepin"	2015	Bladee	—N/a
"Prom Night"	2015	Gucci Mane, Throwback, Sy Ari Da Kid, Lil Flash	East Atlanta Santa 2
"X o n u"	2015	Bladee, Thaiboy Digital	—N/a
"Drifting"	2016	Uli K	—N/a
"El Chapo"	2016	Ballout	—N/a
"Ten"	2016	Adamn Killa	Back 2 Ballin
"Schemin"	2016	Uli K	Bala Comp, Vol 1
"Self Control"	2016	Frank Ocean, Austin Feinstein	Blonde
"Always Up"	2016	Riff Raff	Balloween
"MJ"	2016	Bladee	rip bladee
"50sacinmysocidgaf"	2016	Bladee	rip bladee
"Red Line II (127 Sätra C) 4"	2017	Varg	Nordic Flora Series Pt. 3: Gore-Tex City
"No Mercy"	2017	Yung Bans	—N/a
"First Crush"	2017	Bladee, Ecco2k	D&G
"Can't Trust"	2017	Thaiboy Digital	D&G
"Lordship"	2017	Bladee	Working on Dying
"Cherry Bracelets"	2017	Bladee	Working on Dying
"King Cobra"	2018	Thaiboy Digital	—N/a
"When The Sun's Gone"	2018	Sami Baha	—N/a
"Spider Feet"	2018	Suicideyear	—N/a
"10K Froze"	2018	D33J	Infinity 33
"Inside Out"	2018	Bladee	Icedancer
"Red Velvet"	2019	Bladee	—N/a
"First Class"	2019	Thaiboy Digital	—N/a
"Famous"	2019	Black Kray, YSB OG	—N/a
"1:1"	2019	Ecco2k, Thaiboy Digital	Trash Island
"Legendary Member"	2019	Thaiboy Digital	Legendary Member
"Black Car"	2019	Adamn Killa	—N/a
"Divine Madness"	2019	Wondha Mountain	—N/a
"Evigheten"	2020	Abidaz	—N/a
"Parasail"	2023	Travis Scott	Utopia
"The 360 remix"	2024	Charli XCX, Robyn	Brat and It's Completely Different but Also Still Brat

== Production discography ==
=== 2017 ===
Huncho Jack – Huncho Jack, Jack Huncho

- 08. "Dubai Shit" (co-produced by Vinylz, Oz and Yung Gud)
