= Oskar Ekman =

Swedish music manager, label owner

- Born: 1 February 1982 (age 44); Gislaved, Sweden
- Genres: Hip hop, Electronic Experimental, Punk
- Occupations: Manager, A&R, Label Owner
- Years active: 2004–present
- Label: YEAR0001

Oskar Ekman is a Swedish music manager, label owner and former agent. Known primarily for co-founding independent label YEAR0001 alongside Emilio Fagone, Ekman also played in several bands including Nine and Last Days of April. Prior to founding YEAR0001, he served as manager to Swedish pop act Lorentz.

== Career ==
=== 2004 - 2016 ===
From 2004 to 2013, Ekman worked as an agent for Swedish booking companies Luger and Blixten. After exiting his role at Blixten, he managed Swedish artist Lorentz during the production and release of his 2014 album, Kärlekslåtar. The album would go on to be nominated for a Swedish Grammis and was received positively by critics. While managing Lorentz, he shared an office with YEAR0001 co-founder Emilio Fagone, prompting their decision to go into business together.

=== 2016 - Present ===
Since 2016, Ekman has worked with several internationally acclaimed Swedish artists, including Yung Lean, Dungen and Viagra Boys, primarily as a manager.

The formation of Viagra Boys was assisted by Ekman, who booked them their first studio session with Daniel Fagerström, a former member of Swedish punk band The Skull Defects alongside Jean-Louis Huhta.

In addition to his work at YEAR0001, Ekman has worked with several artists in a variety of capacities, notably as an A&R for Swedish rapper Henok Achido during the recording of the Grammis-nominated album Bror Utan Sol: Bland Rök Och Stearin.

in 2016, Ekman sold his car in order to purchase Robotberget studios from Swedish band Miike Snow

He was present during the shooting incident that occurred outside of a 2016 Yung Lean show in Pittsburgh.

== Discography ==
Year	Artist	Album	Label	Format	Credited as		Nominations
Year	Artist	Album	Label	Format	A&R	Executive Producer	Nominations
2016	Nadia Tehran	Life Is Cheap, Death Is Free	YEAR0001	EP	Yes	Yes	
2016	Viagra Boys	Consistency of Energy	YEAR0001	EP	Yes	No	
2016	Yung Lean	Warlord	YEAR0001	Album	Yes	No	Grammis Nomination for Årets Hip-Hop
2016	Yung Lean	Frost God	YEAR0001	Album	Yes	No	
2016	Död Mark	Drabbad Av Sjukdom	YEAR0001	Album	Yes	No	
2017	Viagra Boys	Call of The Wild	YEAR0001	EP	Yes	No	Grammis Nomination for Årets Rock
2017	Jonatan Leandoer96	Psychopath Ballads	YEAR0001	EP	Yes	No	
2017	Yung Lean	Stranger	YEAR0001	Album	Yes	No	Grammis Win for Årets Hip-Hop, Nordic Music Prize Nomination
2017	Yung Sherman	Innocence	YEAR0001	EP	Yes	No	
2017	Yung Sherman	Innocence	YEAR0001	EP	Yes	No	
2018	Viagra Boys	Street Worms	YEAR0001	Album	Yes	No	Grammis Nomination for Årets Rock, Nordic Music Prize Nomination, Impala Independent Album of the Year
2018	Yung Lean	Poison Ivy	YEAR0001	Album	Yes	No	
2019	Nadia Tehran	Dozakh: All Lover's Hell	YEAR0001	Album	Yes	No	Nordic Music Prize Nomination
2019	Henok Achido	Bror Utan Sol (Bland Rök och Stearin)	Arketyp	Album	Yes	No	Grammis nominations for Årets Hip-Hop and Årets Textförfattare
2019	Jonatan Leandoer96	Nectar	YEAR0001	Album	Yes	No	
2020	Yung Lean	Starz	YEAR0001	Album	Yes	No	
2020	Bladee	Exeter	YEAR0001	Album	Yes	No	
2020	Bladee	333	YEAR0001	Album	Yes	No	
2020	Various Artists	Rift One	YEAR0001	Compilation Album	Yes	No	
2020	Bladee	Good Luck	YEAR0001	Album	Yes	No	
2021	Viagra Boys	Welfare Jazz	YEAR0001	Album	Yes	No	
2021	Dim Spirit	Clear Recent History	YEAR0001	Album	Yes	No	
2021	Aamu Kuu	Vive La France / AAA	YEAR0001	Single	Yes	No	
2021	Jaqe & Michel Dida	Driftarens Guide Till Galaxen	Arketyp	EP	Yes	No	
2021	Jaqe	Filmen	Arketyp	Album	Yes	No	Grammis nominated for Hip Hop of the Year Grammis winner for Lyricist of the Year
2021	Provoker	Body Jumper	YEAR0001	Album	Yes	No	
2021	Gud & Rx Papi	Foreign Exchange	YEAR0001	Album	Yes	No	
2022	Stella Explorer	Dorkay House	YEAR0001	EP	Yes	No	
2022	Viagra Boys	Cave World	YEAR0001	Album	Yes	No	
