= Unknown Death 2002 =

Mixtape by Yung Lean
- Released: 9 July 2013
- Genres: Cloud rap; experimental hip-hop; emo rap; trap
- Length: 40:05
- Label: Mishka NYC
- Producers: Friendzone; Gregar; Suicideyear; White Armor; Yung Gud; Yung Sherman

Yung Lean chronology
Unknown Death 2002 (2013)	Lavender EP (2013)

Singles from Unknown Death 2002
- 1. "Gatorade" Released: 12 April 2013; 2. "Hurt" Released: 26 April 2013

Professional ratings
Review scores
Source	Rating
Consequence of Sound	(C−)

Unknown Death 2002 is the debut mixtape by the Swedish rapper Yung Lean. It was released on 9 July 2013 by Mishka NYC. It serves as Yung Lean's first full length project, and his breakout mixtape, bringing more attention to both Lean and Swedish hip hop. Despite opening to negative reception from music critics, Unknown Death 2002 quickly gained a cult following by both fans and listeners.

== Critical reception ==
Unknown Death 2002 received mixed to negative reviews. Pat Levy of Consequence of Sound said "Many of these songs serve no greater purpose than something to get depressed and/or high too, both for Yung Lean and his fans. The end result of his Sad Boy persona is a debut mixtape that showcases promising producers, a burgeoning microgenre, and a rapper confused about how good he might be."

== Track listing ==
All tracks are written by Yung Lean.

No.	Title	Producer(s)	Length
1.	"Welcome 2 Unknown Death"	Yung Sherman	1:52
2.	"Nitevision" (featuring Bladee)	Yung Gud	3:44
3.	"Oceans 2001"	Gregar	3:26
4.	"Gatorade"	Yung Gud	3:19
5.	"Hurt"	Suicideyear	4:07
6.	"Lightsaber // Saviour"	Yung Sherman	4:34
7.	"Princess Daisy"	Yung Gud	3:35
8.	"Lemonade" (featuring Baba Stiltz)	Yung Sherman	3:16
9.	"Emails"	White Armor	3:00
10.	"Deathstar // Getting Benjamins"	White Armor	2:48
11.	"Heal You // Bladerunner" (featuring Bladee)	White Armor	3:04
12.	"Solarflare"	Friendzone	3:20
Total length:			40:05
