= Kyoto (Yung Lean song) =

Single by Yung Lean
- Released: December 10, 2013
- Recorded: 2013
- Genre: Cloud rap
- Length: 4:30
- Label: Revenue
- Songwriter: Yung Lean
- Producer: Yung Gud

Yung Lean singles chronology
"Marble Phone" (2013)	"Kyoto" (2013)	"Yoshi City" (2014)

Music video
- "Kyoto" on YouTube

"Kyoto" is a single by Swedish rapper Yung Lean released on December 10, 2013. It was self-released prior to his debut studio album Unknown Memory, but did not appear on it. The track was produced entirely by Yung Gud and contains no use of a sample. The music video for "Kyoto" was released on December 10, 2013.

Following a period of growing Internet recognition due to the popularity of Lavender EP and Unknown Death 2002, Yung Lean was drawing anticipation for the release of his debut studio album. "Kyoto" was teased on his Instagram profile and Twitter account before being released to his SoundCloud on December 10, 2013. Currently, the song has fifteen million plays on SoundCloud and over a hundred million streams on Spotify. On YouTube, the music video has more than sixty million views.

"Kyoto" is an ethereal and expansive beat surrounded by lush synthesizers and heavy reverb. In "Kyoto", similar to other Yung Lean tracks like "Yoshi City" and "Gatorade", Lean's voice is encompassed by the production. Yung Gud built the instrumental around a single vocal take, adding melodies and basslines where he saw fit. The production has received unanimous acclaim for its futuristic-sounding combination of cloud rap and trap music. The New York Times noted "Kyoto"'s production as "keening [and] spooky". "Kyoto" is widely considered by critics and fans alike to be Yung Lean's best song and one of the best cloud rap songs of all time.

== Track listing ==
All tracks are written by Yung Lean.

No.	Title	Producer(s)	Length
1.	"Kyoto"	Yung Gud	4:30
Total length:			4:30

== Development ==
"Kyoto" was created in ten to fifteen minutes, with the hook of the track being built around only one vocal take.

== Release ==
"Kyoto" was considered by The Fader to be Yung Lean's breakthrough track and his most popular song. A music video for the song was filmed in Amsterdam, and Yung Lean recalls a high-budget production company wanting to make a video for the song: "They came up with an idea and I was like, no fuck that, I want quads, I want a car, I want us to be sponsored by Versace and North Face. I was dreaming and making shit up but they came through."
