= Stardust (mixtape) =

Mixtape by Yung Lean
- Released: 8 April 2022
- Genre: Cloud rap
- Length: 35:31
- Label: World Affairs
- Producer: Yung Lean; Art Dealer; Fredrik Okazaki; Jack Donoghue; Lusi; Skrillex; Ssaliva; Whitearmor; Woesum; Yung Sherman

Yung Lean chronology
| Starz (2020) | Stardust (2022) | Psykos (2024) |

Singles from Stardust
- 1. "Trip" Released: 25 March 2022

Stardust is the fourth mixtape by Swedish rapper Yung Lean. It was released on 8 April 2022 by the label World Affairs.

== Background ==
Yung Lean began work on Stardust in 2020, influenced by the work of Phil Spector and his Wall of Sound. A snippet of "Bliss" was released on 30 September 2020 to the rapper's social media. The lead and only single for the project, "Trip", was released on 25 March 2022 along with an accompanying video.

== Critical reception ==
Professional ratings
Review scores
| Source | Rating |
|---|---|
| Analog Planet | 7/10 |
| Pitchfork | 7.5/10 |

Nadine Smith of Pitchfork remarked, "Set against the glistening voices of his Drain Gang associates Bladee and Ecco2k on "SummerTime Blood", Lean's tone is rougher and more down to earth, whereas his collaborators tilt toward the angelic. On “Starz2TheRainbow", featuring Thaiboy Digital, several layers of overdubs circle and collide with one another, transforming Lean into an erratic choir." In a mixed review, Malachi Lui of Analog Planet stated, "While Stardust doesn't offer anything groundbreaking, it's a good mixtape from a restlessly creative legend who's far from finished."

== Track listing ==
Stardust track listing
| No. | Title | Writer(s) | Producer(s) | Length |
|---|---|---|---|---|
| 1. | "Bliss" (featuring FKA Twigs) | Yung Lean; Fredrik Okazaki; FKA Twigs; Oleg Parastaev^{[a]} | Fredrik Okazaki; Yung Lean | 2:51 |
| 2. | "Trip" | Yung Lean; Fredrik Okazaki; Art Dealer; Woesum | Fredrik Okazaki; Woesum; Art Dealer | 2:58 |
| 3. | "Gold" | Yung Lean; Fredrik Okazaki; Woesum; Whitearmor | Fredrik Okazaki; Woesum; Whitearmor | 1:51 |
| 4. | "Starz2theRainbow" (featuring Thaiboy Digital) | Yung Lean; Fredrik Okazaki; Ssaliva; Thaiboy Digital | Fredrik Okazaki; Ssaliva | 3:48 |
| 5. | "All the Things" | Yung Lean; Fredrik Okazaki; Woesum; Whitearmor; Jack Donoghue | Fredrik Okazaki; Woesum; Whitearmor; Jack Donoghue | 2:54 |
| 6. | "Lips" (featuring Skrillex) | Yung Lean | Fredrik Okazaki; Skrillex | 2:37 |
| 7. | "Paradise Lost" (featuring Ant Wan) | Yung Lean; Fredrik Okazaki; Ssaliva; Ant Wan | Fredrik Okazaki; Ssaliva | 3:47 |
| 8. | "SummerTime Blood" (featuring Bladee, Ecco2k and Skrillex) | Yung Lean; Fredrik Okazaki; Ecco2k; Bladee; Skrillex | Fredrik Okazaki; Skrillex | 3:02 |
| 9. | "Nobody Else" | Yung Lean; Fredrik Okazaki; Woesum; Yung Sherman | Fredrik Okazaki; Woesum; Yung Sherman | 2:37 |
| 10. | "Waterfall" | Yung Lean; Fredrik Okazaki; Ssaliva | Fredrik Okazaki; Ssaliva | 4:30 |
| 11. | "Letting It All Go" | Yung Lean; Fredrik Okazaki; Lusi | Fredrik Okazaki; Lusi | 2:28 |
| 12. | "Visions (Outro)" | Yung Lean; Fredrik Okazaki; Ssaliva | Fredrik Okazaki; Ssaliva | 2:04 |
| Total length: | | | | 35:31 |

Notes

- ^{^[a]} "Bliss" contains a sample of "Na Zare" by Alyans

== Charts ==
Chart performance for Stardust
| Chart (2022) | Peak position |
|---|---|
| Swedish Albums (Sverigetopplistan) | 21 |
