= Kyoto (disambiguation) =

Kyoto is a Japanese city, and the capital of Kyoto Prefecture.

Kyoto may also refer to:

- Kyoto Prefecture, a jurisdiction in Japan
- Kyoto Protocol, an international Framework Convention on Climate Change
- Kyoto University, a Japanese national university in the city of Kyoto
- Kyoto Sanga FC, a football (soccer) club in Kyoto
- Kyoto Electronics, a Mexican electronics company
- Kyoto, a danzan-ryū technique of jujutsu
- Kyoto (play), a 2024 play by Joe Murphy and Joe Robertson

== Music ==
- Kyoto (Art Blakey album), by Art Blakey and the Jazz Messengers, 1964
- Kyoto (Tyga album), 2018
- "Kyoto" (Skrillex song), 2011
- "Kyoto" (Yung Lean song), 2013
- "Kyoto" (Phoebe Bridgers song), 2020
- "Kyoto", a song by C418 from Minecraft – Volume Beta
- "Kyoto", a song by Feeder from Tallulah
