= Hoover (song) =

Single by Yung Lean

from the album Warlord
- B-side: "How U Like Me Now?"
- Released: 20 January 2016
- Recorded: 2015
- Genre: Industrial hip hop; cloud rap
- Length: 2:41
- Label: YEAR0001
- Songwriter: Yung Lean
- Producer: Yung Gud

Yung Lean singles chronology
"Crystal Clear Ice" (2015)	"Hoover" (2016)	"Af1s" (2016)

Music video
- "Hoover" on YouTube

"Hoover" is a song by Swedish rapper Yung Lean, released in 2016. A music video was originally released for the song in November 2015, and the song was released online digitally on 20 January 2016 in promotion for the upcoming Yung Lean album, Warlord.

== Background ==
In a 2020 interview with Kerwin Frost, Yung Lean said that the song came from him and Gud wanting to make a song that had a "Korn, Slipknot vibe" and that he wanted to sound "evil".

== Track listing ==
No.	Title	Producer(s)	Length
1.	"Hoover"	Yung Gud	2:41
2.	"How U Like Me Now?" (featuring Thaiboy Digital)	Yung Gud	4:00
Total length:			6:41

== Personnel ==
- Yung Lean – Vocals
- Thaiboy Digital – Vocals on "How U Like Me Now?

=== Production ===
- Yung Gud – Producer
