= Yoshi City =

Single by Yung Lean

from the album Unknown Memory
- Released: 17 June 2014
- Recorded: 2014
- Genre: Cloud rap
- Length: 3:45
- Label: Sky Team
- Songwriter: Yung Lean
- Producer: Yung Gud

Yung Lean singles chronology
"Kyoto" (2013)	"Yoshi City" (2014)	"Crystal Clear Ice" (2015)

Music video
- "Yoshi City" on YouTube

"Yoshi City" is a song by Swedish rapper Yung Lean, released in 2014. It was the first single released for his debut album, Unknown Memory.

On 17 June 2014 a video for the song was released, directed by Marcus Söderlund. The Fader described it as "a glossy, big-budget Sad Boys production compared to the dial-up, Windows 95 quality of his other videos."

== Track listing ==
No.	Title	Producer(s)	Length
1.	"Yoshi City"	Yung Gud	3:45
Total length:			3:45

== Personnel ==
- Yung Lean – Vocals

=== Production ===
- Yung Gud – Producer
