= Crystal Clear Ice =

Single by Yung Lean

from the album Adult Swim Singles Program 2015
- Released: 6 July 2015
- Recorded: 2015
- Genre: Cloud rap
- Length: 4:03
- Label: Williams Street Records
- Songwriter: Yung Lean
- Producer: Yung Sherman

Yung Lean singles chronology
| "Yoshi City" (2014) | "Crystal Clear Ice" (2015) | "Hoover" (2016) |

"Crystal Clear Ice" is a song by Swedish rapper Yung Lean, released in 2015. It was released as part of the Adult Swim Singles Program 2015.

== Track listing ==
| No. | Title | Producer(s) | Length |
|---|---|---|---|
| 1. | "Crystal Clear Ice" | Yung Sherman | 4:03 |
| Total length: | | | 4:03 |

== Personnel ==
- Yung Lean – Vocals
- Yung Sherman – Producer
