= Marcus Söderlund =

Swedish film director

Marcus Söderlund is a Swedish music video, commercial and documentary director. He has directed music videos for several Swedish artists such as Yung Lean, The Tough Alliance, jj, Fibes, Oh Fibes!, Jens Lekman and Miike Snow, and has worked with international artists such as The xx, Lissie, Mura Masa and Mount Kimbie.

Aside from directing music videos, Söderlund has directed some documentaries, including one about the band Fibes, Oh Fibes! and another about the football player Håkan Mild. He has also directed commercials for McLaren, Reebok, Lloyds Banking Group, BBC, Vodafone and Avis among others.

The music video for The Tough Alliance's song "Silly Crimes", which Marcus Söderlund directed, was featured on Pitchfork's list of The Top 50 Music Videos of the 2000s. Marcus Söderlund has regularly been featured in Campaign Magazine's Annual as one of the top directors in the industry.

== Videography ==
2006

- Marit Bergman - "Eyes Were Blue"
- Koop - "Come To Me"
- Fibes, Oh Fibes! - "Get Up"
- The Tough Alliance - "Silly Crimes"
- The Embassy - "Stage Persona"

2007

- Jens Lekman - "Sipping On The Sweet Nectar"
- The Tough Alliance - "A New Chance"
- The Honeydrips - "I Wouldn't Know What To Do"
- Vapnet - "Tar Tillbaka Det"
- Kalle J - "Vingslag"
- The Tough Alliance - "First Class Riot"
- Koop - "I See A Different You"

2008

- Sahara Hotnights - "In Private"
- First Floor Power - "The Jacket"
- Bengt Svan - "Gubbpepp"
- Nordpolen - "Skimret"
- The Tough Alliance - "Neo Violence"
- Joel Alme - "The Queen's Corner"
- Jonas Game - "Nothing To Lose"

2009

- Miike Snow - "Silvia"
- jj - "Baby"
- Taken by Trees - "My Boys"
- Jenny Wilson - "Like A Fading Rainbow"
- Fibes, Oh Fibes! - "Love Child"
- Avner - "Bed för mig"
- Marit Bergman - "Bang Bang"
- Air France - "No Excuses"

2010

- Lissie - "Everywhere I Go"
- ceo - "Come With Me"
- jj - "Let Go"
- The xx - "VCR"

2011

- Jessie Ware & Sampha - "Valentine"
- Architecture in Helsinki - "Escapee"

2012

- Loreen - "Euphoria"
- Jens Lekman - "Become Someone Else's"
- Jens Lekman - "I Know What Love Isn't"
- Jens Lekman - "Erica America"

2013

- John Olav Nilsen & Gjengen - "Bensinbarn"
- Mount Kimbie & King Krule - "You Took Your Time"

2014

- John Martin - "Anywhere for you"
- 1987 - "Michelle"
- Yung Lean - "Yoshi City"
- Lorentz feat. Jaqe, Duvchi, jj, Joy - "Där dit vinden kommer"

2015

- Yung Lean & Thaiboy Digital - "Diamonds"

2016

- Yung Lean - "Miami Ultras"

2017

- Yung Lean - "Red Bottom Sky"

2018

- Yung Lean - "Happy Feet"

2019

- Sarah Klang - "It's Been Heaven Knowing You"
- Palmistry - "Water"

2020

- Lorentz feat. Duvchi - "Intro"
- Mura Masa, Ellie Rowsell, Wolf Alice - "Teenage Headache Dreams"
- Abidaz feat. Yung Lean - "Evigheten"
- Yung Lean - Violence + Pikachu

2022

- Yung Lean - Waterfall
