= Na Zare =

Song by Alyans

"Na zare"

Song by Alyans
- Language: Russian
- English title: At Dawn
- Released: 1987
- Recorded: 1986
- Genre: Post-punk; Synthpop; New wave
- Length: 5:46
- Songwriter: Oleg Parastaev
- Producer: Igor Zamaraev

Music video
- Video on YouTube

"Na zare" (Russian: На заре, lit. 'At Dawn') is a song by the Soviet group Alyans, originally released in 1987. It is the band's most well-known song. The song became a viral hit in 2019 when Oleg Parastaev, the former keyboardist and songwriter for Alyans, uploaded a previously unaired music video to YouTube.

== Background ==
"Na zare" was written by Oleg Parastaev when he was the keyboardist in Alyans. The musicians recorded and mixed the song in four hours at Muslim Magomayev's studio with sound engineer Igor Zamaraev. "Na zare" appeared on the group's 1987 album, Alliance-87 (Russian: «Альянс-87»), originally released as an unofficial cassette tape. The album was reissued in 2019 by Maschina Records.

A live version of "Na zare", credited as "V nebesakh..." (Russian: В небесах..., lit. 'In the sky'), was included on the Melodiya release Rok-panorama-87 (Russian: Рок-панорама-87), a collection of recordings from the Moscow rock festival.

== Music video ==
There are several videos associated with the song. One music video was previously shown on the TV program Vzglyad. In addition, a concert recording was made of the group performing "Na zare" for Rok i vokrug nego (Russian: «Рок и вокруг него», lit. 'Rock and around it'), a 1987 teleconference between Moscow and Leningrad.

Another music video for the song was filmed in 1987, but remained unreleased until 2019, as the musicians had been unsatisfied with the results. Parastaev found the video in his archives and restored it with the help of the original director, Mikhail Makarenkov. Parastaev uploaded the video to his YouTube channel on 5 April 2019. The video received almost half a million views within a day, and YouTube suspended Parastaev's channel for alleged violation of its community guidelines. On 9 April 2019, the channel was restored.

== Cover versions ==
Russian electronic project «Antenn MC & DJ Jamm» released a cover (under title "V nebesah") on debut album of the same name in 1996.

The Moscow rock group MAD DOG (Russian: МЭД ДОГ) released a cover in 2001.

Yevgeni Grishkovetz, performing with the group Bigudi (Russian: Бигуди) and Brainstorm's vocalist, Renārs Kaupers, covered the song in 2007 adding some lyrics about his nostalgic feelings and the song's influence.

On 30 December 2018, the singer-songwriter Monetochka performed a cover of the song on the late-night talk show Evening Urgant.

The rapper Basta released a cover in October 2019.

Synthwave band Shades of Thunder released a cover in June 2021.

In 2022, Swedish rapper Yung Lean and English singer-songwriter FKA Twigs released the song "Bliss", featured on the mixtape Stardust, which heavily samples the song.

== Use in media ==
The song is included in the soundtrack for the films Hardcore Henry, Kanikuly prezidenta (Russian: Каникулы президента, lit. 'The President's Vacation'), The Perfect Ones, and Gromkaya svyaz (Russian: Громкая связь, lit. 'Speakerphone').

== Legacy ==
"Na zare" was ranked 75th in the list of the "100 Best Russian Rock Songs of the Twentieth Century" compiled by Nashe Radio on 31 December 1999. Writing about the song for the Russian online arts and culture publication Colta.ru, Denis Boyarinov states that "everyone born in the Soviet Union should know the chorus of 'Na zare'".

Victor Pelevin, in his novel "IPhuck 10", described "Na Zare" as "sonic analogue of the myrrh-streaming icon".
