= Ginseng Strip 2002 =

2013 song by Yung Lean

- SoundCloud cover

Single by Yung Lean

from the EP Lavender EP
- Released: 19 January 2013
- Recorded: 2012–2013
- Genre: Cloud rap; trap
- Length: 2:34
- Label: Revenue
- Songwriter: Jonatan Håstad
- Producer: Yung Gud

Music video
- "Ginseng Strip 2002" on YouTube

"Ginseng Strip 2002" is a song by Swedish rapper Yung Lean from his first EP, Lavender EP (2013). It was released as a single on January 19, 2013 and produced by Yung Gud. The song's music video went viral in 2013, leading to Lean's rise to fame and the wider popularization of cloud rap and later SoundCloud rap.

In 2022, the song garnered renewed popularity through the video-sharing app TikTok, where it became the most streamed song on the platform, globally that year, as well as charting at number 47 on the Billboard Global 200 for the first time.

== Background ==
Yung Lean accredited the title "Ginseng Strip 2002" to spontaneity, stating: "we wanted something with 2002, and ginseng, the tea". Additionally, Arizona iced tea and early 2000s nostalgia became aesthetic hall markers for Yung Lean's early music. In 2014, Vice interviewed Lean on the trend, he stated:

It started out as an anti-movement. A couple of years ago a bunch of young rappers came up, like Joey Bada$$, a bunch of those guys. They were all repping the 1990s. [...] We started saying 2002 and 2003 because those years look good if you write them down. They're aesthetically pleasing.

== Music and sample ==
In 2014, producer Yung Gud described the process of recording the single, stating: "'Ginseng Strip 2002' was just a sound check — he [Yung Lean] was just checking to see if the microphone was working." Followed by Gud stating, "the first idea is always the best one." According to Vice, the song sees Lean drawing influence from rapper Lil B and talking "about getting dome from a crackhead who looks like Zooey Deschanel".

The song was built on a chopped sample loop titled "Loop 61" by Japanese beatmaker De De Mouse, who constructed the main loop using a rendition of the Indian hymn "Aneyu Karadare" by 16th century composer Purandara Dasa found in the Heart of Asia sample library released in 1995 by Spectrasonics, and later added backing melodies. Producer Yung Gud added trap-based instrumentation and slowed down De De Mouse's sample loop. The final beat was made in around 5–10 minutes. The original loop had been released through the Los Angeles-based record label Dublab as part of their open-source project Into Infinity. The project invited 108 producers to contribute eight-second loops with any ambiance, tonality, or texture, resulting in a collection of 279 loops released under a Creative Commons Attribution-Noncommercial license.

It is likely the track was produced in Ableton Live 9. In a 2014 interview with Red Bull Music Academy, Yung Gud described his early use of GarageBand and Fruity Loops before settling on Ableton as his primary production software.

== Lawsuit ==
In 2021, Dublab discovered that Yung Lean had sampled "Loop 61" through a post on Reddit dated March 26, 2021. As the unauthorized sampling was outside of the scope permitted by the license, they quickly contacted Yung Lean's label Year0001, notifying them about the sample's usage, which the label responded to by saying:

[...] we love dublab and we have the upmost respect and admiration for your work. . . . Would love to make something happen with YEAR0001 and dublab one day. Let's stay on contact!

By 2022, the song went viral on TikTok and charted at number 47 on the Billboard Global 200 chart for the first time. Dublab credited the song's success to their original sample loop. Year0001 stopped responding to Dublab and did not collaborate for their upcoming Membership Drive that year. Following this, Dublab sent a cease-and-desist letter regarding Yung Lean and Yung Gud's unauthorized sampling of "Loop 61", which was followed by a lawsuit soon after.

== Music video ==
"Ginseng Strip 2002" was released on January 19, 2013, while the music video was recorded and released a few months later, originally uploaded to YouTube on March 25, 2013. The video was shot at various different locations around Stockholm, particularly Södermalm, after school by Emrik Meshesha (Dj Ferrari), a friend of Lean who mainly filmed BMX clips. In the video, Yung Lean is seen donning a bucket hat and doing Lil B's "cooking dance".

== Critical reception ==
The song has received mixed reception among critics and fans. Jonah Bromwich of Pitchfork wrote a negative critique of Yung Lean's performance and music video: "His verses are stilted, his movements awkward; he resembles a rap-obsessed misfit from a summer camp who freestyles poorly and doesn't worry about distinguishing between the positive and negative attention he's receiving." Cecilia Morales of The Ithacan called his music video "obscure" and said Lean had gained prominence for "producing songs and videos that are so bad they're good".

In 2013, "Ginseng Strip 2002" was ranked number 44 on Consequence of Sound's list "Top 50 Songs of 2013".

== Legacy ==
In 2013, the release of the music video to "Ginseng Strip 2002" on YouTube, quickly led to Yung Lean's rise to fame, as well as the wider popularization of styles such as cloud rap and later SoundCloud rap.

In 2022, the song garnered renewed popularity through the video-sharing app TikTok, where it became the most streamed song on the platform, globally that year, as well as charting at number 47 on the Billboard Global 200 for the first time.

== Track listing ==
All tracks are written by Yung Lean.

No.	Title	Producer(s)	Length
1.	"Ginseng Strip 2002"	Yung Gud	2:34
Total length:			2:34

== Charts ==
Chart (2022)	Peak position
Canada (Canadian Hot 100)	55
Global 200 (Billboard)	47
South Africa Streaming (TOSAC)	58
Sweden Heatseeker (Sverigetopplistan)	4
UK Hip Hop/R&B (Official Charts)	24
UK Indie (Official Charts)	13
