= Exeter (album) =

Studio album by Bladee
- Released: 8 April 2020
- Recorded: 2019; Gotland, Sweden
- Genre: Experimental pop
- Length: 18:21
- Label: Year0001
- Producer: Gud

Bladee chronology
Trash Island (2019)	Exeter (2020)	333 (2020)

Exeter is the third studio album by the Swedish rapper Bladee, released by Year0001 on 8 April 2020. Recorded during a week period in Gotland, it is his first album to be significantly produced by Gud. It is an experimental pop album that contains influences from cloud rap and pop music. Its lyrics are stripped down and minimal, and explore themes of optimism and adoration. Exeter contains stripped-back production with Auto-Tuned vocals and a more hopeful and positive approach than Bladee's previous work, according to music critics. The album received approval from Pitchfork and laut.de. A European tour for October 2020 was scheduled to support the album.

== Background and release ==
Bladee released his second studio album Red Light on 11 May 2018. Later that year, he released the mixtape Icedancer, which was followed by 2019's Trash Island, a collaboration album with Drain Gang. Exeter was executive produced by Gud, which marks the first time Bladee has significantly worked with him on an album. It was recorded in a week during a trip to Gotland during 2019. Speaking with Spotify, he said the inspiration behind the album "was trying to paint and express an inner image or feeling that I have through sound". Exeter was released by Year0001 on 8 April 2020. A European tour during October 2020 was scheduled to support the album.

== Composition ==
=== Overview ===
Though Yannik Gölz of laut.de has said Exeter is "a cloud rap distillate as an experimental pop album", (Note: This quote is a translation of the original text: "Cloud Rap-Destillat als experimentelles Popalbum") Torsten Ingvaldsen from Hypebeast wrote that the album departs from Bladee's "normative blend of ambient pop and cloud rap". He also believed the album's atmosphere was more psychedelic and thought the stripped-back production contains a "blend of trance pads and trap". Pitchfork's Ben Dandridge-Lemco wrote that the album pushes toward "blissful pop and strips down his lyrics to their most minimal extreme". He also thought that Gud's production "glues the album together". Gud's production on the album typically reduces the echo effects in the album's psychedelic and synthesized sound. There are usually no drums in the tracks, and the production contains off-course sounds with "beeps and bleeps", (Note: This quote is a translation of the original text: "Bliepen und Blupen") according to Gölz. The album also consists of odd melodies that are created by Bladee's Auto-Tuned vocals. Gölz felt the album was most likely inspired by Yves Tumor, Clams Casino, Hiroshi Yoshimura, or Brian Eno.

The lyrics in Exeter are stripped down and minimal, and explore themes of optimism and adoration. Bladee's voice was described as "fragile" (Note: This quote is a translation of the original text: "fragil") by Gölz and he wrote that the lyrics are "presented so vulnerable and naked". (Note: This quote is a translation of the original text: "so verwundbar und nackt werden die lyrics dargeboten") He also thought that the album is more hopeful and positive compared to Bladee's previous work. Dandridge-Lemco highlighted the worldbuilding in Bladee's music, and thought that the album "sounds like a warped version of Mario's journey to save Princess Peach". The Fader's Salvatore Maicki wrote that it "feels like a ghoulish circus with no finite boundaries".

=== Songs ===
With its nine tracks, Exeter is Bladee's shortest album. The opening track is "Mirror (Hymn)", subtitled "Intro", which showcases Bladee repeating three phrases: "Mirror in the way", "Follow all the way", and "Window in the way" in a "circular pattern" over sparkling and ascending notes, according to Dandridge-Lemco. The track then sees Bladee singing: "Ego in the way/I go all the way/I'm not in the way". Dandridge-Lemco wrote that the track "serves as a blueprint for his approach". The following "Wonderland" contains an appearance from Ecco2k, which Dandridge-Lemco thought helped kept the track grounded. "Merry-Go-Round" explores the boundaries of Bladee's life atop claps from a drum machine and "glowing synthetic notes", as described by Hubert Adjei-Kontoh from Pitchfork. He also believed the production "creates an oddly analog effect" and that the track "gets behind Bladee's nihilism, where he hides the lyrical melancholy of a true romantic". Dandridge-Lemco said the track strikes "a satisfying balance between simple writing and catchy melody". "Rain3ow Star (Love Is All)" follows, a track where Bladee uses his voice as an instrument, and allows the production to develop on its own.

"Every Moment Special" contains delicate synthesizers, drums that are slightly syncopated, and a "dreamy instrumental arrangement", according to Hypebeast's Charlie Zhang. The song's lyrics contain two repeated phrases; Zhang described Bladee's vocals on the track as "moody" and thought the simple lyrics blend well with the "obscured distortion effects and feedback". Dandridge-Lemco thought that Bladee's influence on groups such as 100 gecs is shown on "DNA Rain", a song that has a glitchy and "angelic" sound. On "Open Symbols (Play) Be in Your Mind", Exeter's seventh track, Bladee emphasizes the line "I'm not special". Ecco2k appears again on the penultimate "Lovestory", a track that was compared to Björk by Anthony Fantano. Fantano also said that it contains "wonderous and gorgeous music box synths" and "minimal and malformed bass and drums". The closing track "Imaginary" has inharmonious keyboard notes.

== Critical reception ==
Professional ratings
Review scores
Source	Rating
laut.de	4/5 stars
The Needle Drop	5/10 (Note: Specifically, Fantano rated the album a "strong 5".)
Pitchfork	7.2/10

In a positive review for Pitchfork, Dandridge-Lemco wrote that Exeter is the "sort of album that rewards you the closer you lean into it". For laut.de, Gölz thought that once the listener settled into the album, it becomes addictive. Fantano enjoyed the album's production and thought that it was imaginative, but felt that a lot of aspects of the album could have been improved. Dandridge-Lemco and Gölz both believed that Exeter would not entice new listeners into Bladee's music; the latter described it as "Drain Gang sound for advanced listeners".

== Track listing ==
All tracks are written by Benjamin Reichwald and Carl-Mikael Berlander, except "Wonderland" and "Lovestory", written by Reichwald, Berlander and Zak Arogundade. All tracks are produced by Gud.

Exeter track listing
No.	Title	Length
1.	"Mirror (Hymn)" (Intro)	1:40
2.	"Wonderland" (featuring Ecco2k)	2:05
3.	"Merry-Go-Round"	2:03
4.	"Rain3ow Star (Love Is All)"	2:14
5.	"Every Moment Special"	2:03
6.	"DNA Rain"	1:47
7.	"Open Symbols (Play) Be in Your Mind"	2:07
8.	"Lovestory" (featuring Ecco2k)	2:15
9.	"Imaginary"	2:06
Total length:		18:21

Notes

- Track titles are stylised in all caps.

== Personnel ==
Credits adapted from the Year0001 website.

- Gud – executive production
- Robin Schmidt – mastering
- Benjamin Reichwald – art

== Release history ==
Region	Date	Format(s)	Label	Edition	Ref.
Worldwide	8 April 2020	Streaming	Year0001	Original	
Worldwide	2023	LP	Year0001	Reissue	
