= Killing Angels =

Studio album by Nine
- Released: September 15, 2003
- Genre: Hardcore punk
- Length: 38:32
- Labels: Alliance Trax, Deathwish
- Producers: Daniel Bergstrand, Nine

Nine chronology
Lights Out (2001)	Killing Angels (2003)	Death is Glorious (2006)

Professional ratings
Review scores
Source	Rating
AllMusic	3/5 stars
Scream Magazine	5/6 stars

Killing Angels is an album by Swedish band Nine.

== Track listing ==
All tracks by Nine.

1. "Inferno" – 3:22
2. "Euthanasia" – 3:07
3. "Watching the Train Go By" – 3:23
4. "The Strategy of Fear" – 3:22
5. "Discontent O.D." – 3:37
6. "The End" – 3:10
7. "Anxiety Report" – 5:53
8. "Cardiac Arrest" – 4:16
9. "33" – 3:42
10. "Them" – 4:40

== Personnel ==
- Jacob Bannon – art direction, design
- Daniel Bergstrand – producer, engineer, mixing
- Robert Karlsson – bass, group member
- Orjan Ornkloo – guitar, engineer
- L.G. Petrov – guest vocals
- Andreas Pettersson Trio – logo
