= Frost God =

Mixtape by Yung Lean
- Released: 14 December 2016
- Length: 25:00
- Label: YEAR0001
- Producer: Acea; Gud; Shlohmo; Whitearmor; Woesum

Yung Lean chronology
Warlord (2016)	Frost God (2016)	Stranger (2017)

Frost God is the second mixtape by Swedish rapper Yung Lean. It was released on 14 December 2016 by YEAR0001. The album was released digitally on iTunes, Apple Music, and Spotify without prior announcement or promotion.

On 25 November 2016, a music video was released for the song "Hennessy & Sailor Moon", directed by Léo Siboni.

== Background ==
In a 2020 interview, Yung Lean stated that he felt the album was a "compilation in a way". He also said to have recorded much of the album while touring to promote his 2016 album Warlord.

== Critical reception ==
Professional ratings
Review scores
Source	Rating
The Observer	2/5 stars
RapReviews	5.5/10

The Observer felt that the album was a retreat of the "chilly synths and affectless monotone in torpid, ever-decreasing circles without even the sparks of energy that livened up this year’s Warlord album". Steve "Flash" Juon of RapReviews praised the production on the album, but was critical of the lyrics, saying "Yung Lean doesn’t have anything interesting to say."

== Track listing ==
All tracks are written by Yung Lean.

No.	Title	Producer(s)	Length
1.	"Back at It"	Gud	1:56
2.	"Hop Out" (featuring Luckaleannn)	Shlohmo	2:46
3.	"Hennessy & Sailor Moon" (featuring Bladee)	Acea	4:14
4.	"Cashin" (featuring Adamn Killa)	Whitearmor	3:46
5.	"Crystal City" (featuring A$AP Ferg)	Acea; Woesum	4:06
6.	"Kirby"	Acea; Whitearmor	2:24
7.	"Head 2 Toe" (featuring Bladee)	Acea; Whitearmor	3:17
8.	"Get It Back"	Whitearmor	2:31
Total length:			25:00
