= Nine (band) =

Swedish hardcore band

- Origin: Sweden
- Genres: Hardcore punk
- Years active: 1994–present
- Labels: Deathwish Inc.
- Members: Johan Lindqvist; Benjamin Vallé; Robert Karlsson; Karl Torstensson; Oskar Ekman

Nine is a Swedish Hardcore punk band, formed in Linköping in 1994. The band has released five albums and two EPs.

== Band members ==
- Johan Lindqvist – lead vocals
- Robert Karlsson – bass
- Karl Torstensson – drums
- Oskar Ekman – guitar

Former members

- Benjamin Vallé – guitar/backing vocals
- Tor Castensson – drums
- Oskar Eriksson – bass
- Gustav Björnsson – bass
- Johan Something Something – guitar
- Erik Nordstedt – guitar

== Discography ==
- To the Bottom [EP] (1995)
- Listen (1997)
- Kissed By the Misanthrope (1998)
- Nine/Like Peter at Home [split album] (2000)
- Lights Out (2001)
- Killing Angels (2003)
- Death Is Glorious [EP] (2006)
- Its Your Funeral (2007)

== Videography ==
- "Time Has Come" (2001)
- "Euthanasia" (2004)
- "Anxiety Report" (2004)
- "Inferno" (2004)
- "Nothing Left for the Vultures" (2007)
- "No Air Supply" (2008)
