= Stranger (Yung Lean album) =

Studio album by Yung Lean
- Released: 10 November 2017
- Genres: Hip-hop; cloud rap
- Length: 46:26
- Label: YEAR0001
- Producers: Gud (also exec.); Yung Sherman; Whitearmor

Yung Lean chronology
Frost God (2016)	Stranger (2017)	Poison Ivy (2018)

Singles from Stranger
- 1. "Red Bottom Sky" Released: 1 September 2017; 2. "Hunting My Own Skin" Released: 22 September 2017; 3. "Skimask" Released: 19 October 2017

Stranger is the third studio album by Swedish rapper Yung Lean. It was released on November 10, 2017, by the label YEAR0001 and was executively produced by Gud, with additional production from Whitearmor and Yung Sherman.

== Critical reception ==
Professional ratings
Aggregate scores
Source	Rating
AnyDecentMusic?	6.3/10
Metacritic	63/100
Review scores
Source	Rating
AllMusic	2/5 stars
The A.V. Club	B−
Clash	8/10
The Guardian	3/5 stars
Mojo	3/5 stars
NME	6/10
The Observer	4/5 stars
Pitchfork	6.8/10
Q	3/5 stars
The Skinny	2/5 stars

At Metacritic, which assigns a normalised rating out of 100 to reviews from mainstream publications, Stranger received an average score of 63, based on 12 reviews, indicating "generally favorable" reception. NME magazine's Jamie Milton noted that "Tragedy surrounds Yung Lean's work, and "Stranger"'s best moments find him channelling turmoil into something cathartic" and said that Stranger was "sad, despairing and desolate". Writing for The Observer, Tara Joshi found the record more comfortable than Lean's previous work, specifically his second major label album, "channelling his uniquely hazy take on melodic southern hip-hop" and said that "Stranger is especially striking for its beautiful production, drifting with dark synth glossiness that can feel a little meandering and aimless but just about avoids self-indulgence." Meaghan Garvey of Pitchfork said that the "Swedish rapper’s third album offers glimpses of his full potential, songs that pierce through the detachment that once obscured real emotion." and said that "In these moments, Lean’s identity shifts from something borrowed to something innate."

== Track listing ==
All tracks written by Yung Lean.

No.	Title	Producer(s)	Length
1.	"Muddy Sea"	Yung Sherman	2:44
2.	"Red Bottom Sky"	Gud	5:03
3.	"Skimask"	Gud	3:16
4.	"Silver Arrows"	Gud; Whitearmor	3:06
5.	"Metallic Intuition"	Gud	3:35
6.	"Push/Lost Weekend"	Gud	2:54
7.	"Salute/Pacman"	Whitearmor	3:17
8.	"Drop It/Scooter"	Gud; Whitearmor	4:05
9.	"Hunting My Own Skin"	Gud; Whitearmor	3:02
10.	"Iceman"	Whitearmor	3:14
11.	"Snakeskin/Bullets"	Gud	1:07
12.	"Fallen Demon"	Yung Sherman	2:47
13.	"Agony"	Gud	3:34
14.	"Yellowman"	Gud; Yung Sherman	4:42
Total length:			46:26

== Charts ==
Chart (2017)	Peak position
New Zealand Heatseeker Albums (RMNZ)	7
Swedish Albums (Sverigetopplistan)	18
UK Indie Album Breakers (Official Charts)	19
UK R&B Albums (Official Charts)	30
UK Record Store Albums (Official Charts)	3
