= Adamn Killa =

American rapper

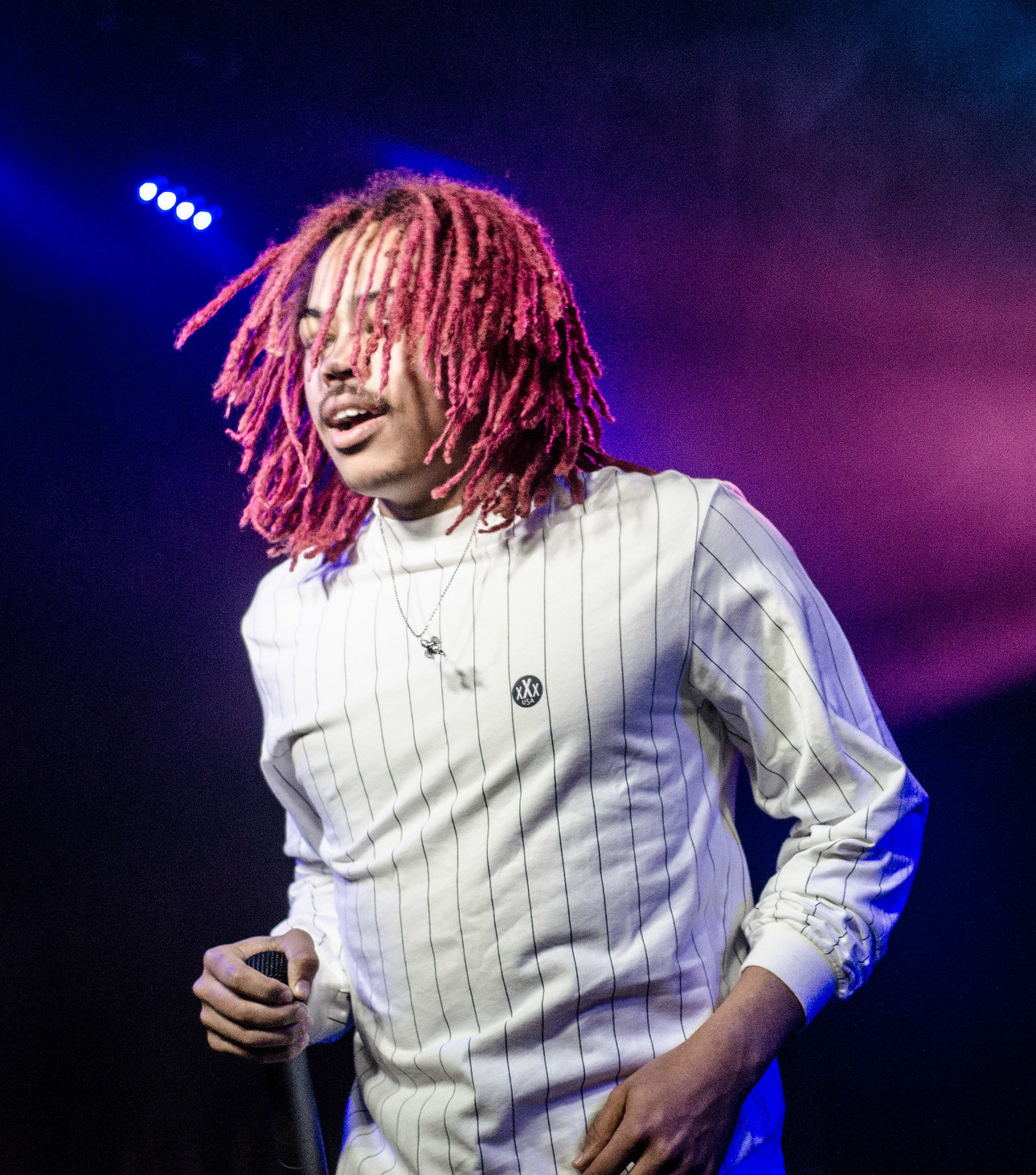
- Adamn Killa in 2016

Background information
- Also known as: Adamnwhotheywant
- Born: Adam Kelly; Chicago, Illinois, U.S.
- Genres: Hip-hop; trap
- Occupations: Rapper; songwriter
- Years active: 2015–present
- Label: Year0001

Adam Kelly, known professionally as Adamn Killa or Adamnwhodeywant, is an American rapper and social media personality. Kelly has been recognized for his collaborations with members of the Year0001 collective, including Yung Lean, Bladee, and Thaiboy Digital.

== Early life ==
Adam Kelly grew up in Chicago, Illinois. He played baseball in high school and college, with him and Gavin Lux playing together growing up.

== Career ==
=== 2015–2021: Early career ===
In October 2015, Adamn released his first EP Libra Season with the artist Blank Body, followed by his debut mixtape Back 2 Ballin in March 2016. Adamn largely remained underground during his first few years, until eventually collaborating with artist Yung Lean in May. Through 2018, Adamn continued this collaborative relationship with Lean with him, Riff Raff, Lil Reek and Z money, with the rappers appearing on his project Adamn Everlasting (In Loving Memory of Jalen).

=== 2022–present: Virality and Generational Run ===
In 2022, after previously working with them, Kelly accused rappers Lil Uzi Vert, DJ Drama, and Don Cannon of scamming him of twenty thousand dollars for a feature.

In 2025, Kelly received widespread attention for his social media stunts which he was using to promote his music. These antics brought him some success, with Kelly charting over mainstream artists such as Drake despite being independent. On June 20, 2025, Adamn released the mixtape Generational Run. He performed at Lyrical Lemonade's Summer Smash music festival the next day. In November that same year, Adamn received attention after being arrested by police after telling cops "Arrest me daddy" as part of a series of social media videos. Kelly performed at Rolling Loud in Orlando, Florida in 2026.
