= Starz (Yung Lean album) =

Studio album by Yung Lean
- Released: 15 May 2020
- Genre: Cloud rap
- Length: 44:15
- Label: YEAR0001
- Producer: Whitearmor (exec.); Yung Sherman

Yung Lean chronology
| Poison Ivy (2018) | Starz (2020) | Stardust (2022) |

Singles from Starz
- 1. "Boylife in EU" Released: 26 February 2020; 2. "Violence" Released: 14 April 2020; 3. "Pikachu" Released: 29 April 2020

Starz is the fourth studio album by Swedish rapper and singer Yung Lean. It was released on 15 May 2020 by the label YEAR0001 and was executively produced by Whitearmor. Recording sessions took place in Los Angeles, Sweden and Portugal.

== Release and promotion ==
On 26 February 2020 Yung Lean released the single "Boylife in EU" and the song and video was met with acclaim. On 27 March 2020 Yung Lean uploaded a 44-second teaser titled "Starz", which featured a mix of new songs and confirmed the release of a new project. Yung Lean was due to start his 'Starz' tour in late March but this was cancelled due to the global COVID-19 pandemic. On 2 April 2020 Yung Lean streamed a 45-minute concert from the back of a truck in an undisclosed location, the stream featuring a mix of songs from previous works, as well as newly-released "Boylife in EU". On 14 April 2020 the second single from Starz was released, "Violence (+ Pikachu)", the single "Pikachu" was released in full on 29 April 2020. Yung Lean began releasing daily snippets of each song on his social media leading to the album release date, each snippet accompanied by a visual for that song.

A video on Instagram of Yung Lean and rapper Playboi Carti working together in a studio led fans to believe Playboi Carti would be a feature on Starz, and the collaboration was subject to much anticipation. A leak of Starz a week before the official release date featured Playboi Carti on the track "Yayo", but the rapper does not feature on the official album release. Yung Lean later clarified that Playboi Carti's label removed his verse from the song. The version of the track containing Playboi Carti's verse remains on vinyl copies of Starz.

== Critical reception ==
Professional ratings
Aggregate scores
| Source | Rating |
|---|---|
| Metacritic | 68/100 |
Review scores
| Source | Rating |
| Beats Per Minute | 77/100 |
| Clash | 7/10 |
| Earmilk | 4/5 stars |
| Exclaim! | 6/10 |
| NME | 3/5 stars |
| Pitchfork | 5.5/10 |
| RapReviews | 6.5/10 |

At Metacritic, which assigns a weighted average rating out of 100 to reviews from mainstream publications, Starz received an average score of 68, based on seven reviews.

Max Pasion-Gonzales of Earmilk stated, "Yung Lean's newest album is likely his strongest and most consistent to date. It effectively elaborates on his preestablished dream trap aesthetics while still abandoning a safe compromise. Many years into his massive career, it's clear that the Swedish prodigy still has unique and engaging ideas that he's not afraid to commit to". Kyle Kohner of Beats Per Minute said, "Filled with drug-addled bangers and overcast slow-burns, each track on Starz is cut from a single cloth that veils the ever-evolving future of cloud rap, beginning with the explosive "My Agenda"". Ross Horton of Clash said, "'Yayo' and 'Butterfly Paralyzed' both showcase Lean's ability to graft chrome-plated hooks onto any track he likes. The former is sparse and simple where the latter is full to the point of overload, but both tracks sound like evolved versions of songs you'd hear on the radio – music for a society of cyborgs". RapReviews.com writer Steve 'Flash' Juon said, "Putting the lyrics aside for the moment I'm willing to say there's something here. The production goes from spartan and airy to distorted and noisy in a way that makes it feel like industrial trap rap, and his accent plays with your expectations of what the flow should be like. ... Ultimately I must still give a "meh" to the overall presentation, because like many of his U.S. counterparts, Yung Lean's music relies more on style than substance".

In mixed reviews, NME critic Luke Morgan Britton said, "Yung Lean’s music has always been more interesting than it is good. Starz features just enough captivating moments to prevent him – now an unexpected seven years into his career – from feeling played-out". Clayton Tomlinson of Exclaim! said, "Despite its brisk pacing, Starz still suffers from bloat. Songs like "Iceheart", "Dance in the Dark", and "My Agenda" could have been left off the track list and made the album more coherent and enjoyable to experience". Sheldon Pearce of Pitchfork said, "While his singing is strained and incompetent, at least he's going for it. Too much of the album seems satisfied with the small space Lean was able to carve out for himself".

== Track listing ==
All tracks are written by Jonatan Leandoer Håstad.

| No. | Title | Producer(s) | Length |
|---|---|---|---|
| 1. | "My Agenda" | Whitearmor | 2:09 |
| 2. | "Yayo" | Whitearmor | 2:37 |
| 3. | "Boylife In EU" | Whitearmor | 3:36 |
| 4. | "Violence" | Whitearmor | 2:52 |
| 5. | "Outta My Head" | Whitearmor | 2:51 |
| 6. | "Dance In The Dark" | Whitearmor; Yung Sherman | 2:53 |
| 7. | "Acid At 7/11" | Whitearmor | 3:12 |
| 8. | "Starz" (featuring Ariel Pink) | Whitearmor | 4:20 |
| 9. | "Hellraiser" | Whitearmor; Yung Sherman | 2:25 |
| 10. | "Butterfly Paralyzed" | Whitearmor | 2:37 |
| 11. | "Dogboy" | Whitearmor | 2:16 |
| 12. | "Iceheart" | Whitearmor; Yung Sherman | 2:08 |
| 13. | "Pikachu" | Whitearmor | 2:07 |
| 14. | "Low" | Whitearmor | 2:44 |
| 15. | "Sunset Sunrise" | Whitearmor | 2:32 |
| 16. | "Put Me In A Spell" | Whitearmor | 2:56 |
| Total length: | | | 44:15 |

== Charts ==
Chart performance for Starz
| Chart (2020) | Peak position |
|---|---|
| Swedish Albums (Sverigetopplistan) | 39 |
