= Unknown Memory =

Studio album by Yung Lean
- Released: 23 September 2014
- Genres: Hip hop; cloud rap
- Length: 41:52
- Label: Sky Team
- Producers: Yung Gud; Whitearmor; Yung Sherman

Yung Lean chronology
Unknown Death 2002 (2013)	Unknown Memory (2014)	Warlord (2016)

Unknown Memory is the debut studio album by Swedish rapper Yung Lean, released by Sky Team on 23 September 2014. The album garnered generally favourable reviews, with many critics honouring its production and for being a more serious piece of work compared to his debut mixtape, Unknown Death 2002.

== Composition ==
Unknown Memory's official press release describes the record as "a hybrid of modern experimental music", with the feeling of "Laser sword melancholia" and arrangements of "ominous synth clouds hovering over clinical beats." A review described Lean's vocals as "somehow distinctly European; less midnight in Vegas more dawn over Berghain, the robotic voice oddly reminiscent of Kraftwerk."

Lyrically, the album deals with "introspection, feelings of alienation, ennui, boredom, all with that vague, dull ache", and "conjures with tropes and social signifiers" common in modern hip-hop to make a feeling instead of an actual narrative, making it up to the listener to come up with their own narrative.

== Release and promotion ==
A bundle of Unknown Memory was also distributed with a hand glove displaying the "Unknown Memory" logo on top of it, which was listed in an article by Kyla Bills of Paper magazine as one of the "10 Weirdest Pieces of Merch Ever Sold By Rappers".

== Critical response ==
Professional ratings
Review scores
Source	Rating
The 405	7.5/10
Consequence of Sound	B−
Fact	3/5
The Line of Best Fit	7.5/10
NME	7/10
The Observer	3/5 stars
Pitchfork Media	3.6/10
Tiny Mix Tapes	3.5/5 stars

Several reviewers praised Unknown Memory as Yung Lean's more serious piece of work than his past releases, and felt that many listeners didn't take him as seriously as he probably should've been. These included The 405 critic Jess Bernard, who called the album "another example of Yung Lean's ability to stunt on a record", with his skills measuring up to those of The Weeknd and Travi$ Scott. He also highlighted the video game and internet-esque musical style, writing that "Most importantly, Yung Lean's created his own lane and an aesthetic that can only be attributed to him and Sadboys." The production of Unknown Memory and how it complemented Lean's rapping was also a common spotlight in reviews. In a Consequence of Sound review, Levy Pat praised how Lean handled his haters on Unknown Memory, with the rapper even thanking the negative attention he received with lines like "Thanks to everyone who hates me/ Only makes me fit my role.” Levy wrote, "To be so self-aware and able to handle criticism is something that Yung Lean should teach every other rapper/musician/human being. Not only is he aware of his critics, but the knock-off versions that come along with any rapper who finds his lane on the internet." He also liked that "Yung Lean takes some of the more familiar rap game tropes and flips them on their heads in a way that only he is capable of." Unknown Memory was number 28 on Pigeons & Planes' list of their favourite albums of 2014, with Joe Price calling the LP an example of why hip-hop doesn't always need to be taken seriously. He also wrote that "It's hard to even call this rap at times, but how it avoids genre conventions is how it remains so exciting throughout its running time. Rarely is music this fun without compromising individuality."

A critic for The Observer opined that "If Unknown Memory doesn’t quite merit the excited bafflement that initially greeted Lean, its nagging hooks and queasy introspection still make for an intriguing trip", while a Fact reviewer said there was something "beguilingly decadent about Unknown Memory: the way Lean’s confessions of world-weary ennui flow seamlessly into brags about wealth and status; how those dreamy, new-age synth lines play out beneath raps that sound spiritually hollow." However, the latter called also some parts of the album pretty weak, including Lean's sometimes "rudimentary" rapping. He also wrote that "More broadly, it feels like there are questions to be asked about a bunch of white European teens appropriating the culture and iconography of black America wholesale." One negative review of Unknown Memory came from Pitchfork Media's Jonah Bromwich, who felt that the rapper was "doubling down" his personality that made his past work enjoyable to listen to and "simultaneously scrubbing away the most amateurish (and most likeable) parts of his sound." He disliked Lean's auto-tuned vocals and "irritating rapping flow", which he felt caused the tracks to be too identical to each other and lost the listeners' interest on the otherwise more "palatable" instrumentals. He also made note of Yung Lean's sadness that he had always presented, which was "kicked into overdrive" and became "empty" on the LP, writing that these sad feelings have been done much better by artists such as Lana Del Rey.

== Track listing ==
All tracks are written by Yung Lean.

No.	Title	Producer(s)	Length
1.	"Blommor (Intro)" (Swedish translation: "flowers")	Yung Gud	1:33
2.	"Blinded"	Yung Gud	4:14
3.	"Sunrise Angel"	Whitearmor	3:00
4.	"Yoshi City"	Yung Gud	3:45
5.	"Ice Cold Smoke"	Yung Gud	1:41
6.	"Dog Walk (Intermission)"	Yung Gud	1:07
7.	"Don't Go"	Yung Sherman	3:56
8.	"Ghosttown" (featuring Travis Scott)	Yung Gud	5:10
9.	"Monster"	Yung Sherman	4:15
10.	"Volt"	Whitearmor; Yung Gud	3:13
11.	"Leanworld"	Whitearmor	3:59
12.	"Sandman"	Yung Sherman	2:59
13.	"Helt ensam (Outro)" (Swedish translation: "all alone")	Yung Gud	3:06

== Charts ==
Chart (2014)	Peak position
US Top Heatseekers (Billboard)	19
US Top R&B/Hip-Hop Albums (Billboard)	36
US Top Rap Albums (Billboard)	22
