= Jonatan (album) =

Studio album by Yung Lean
- Released: 2 May 2025
- Genres: Indie rock; art pop; electronica
- Length: 38:56
- Labels: World Affairs; AWAL
- Producers: Car!ton; Emmanuel Hailemariam; Eurohead; Ging; Marcus White; Oneohtrix Point Never; Rami Dawod; Oscar Ulfheden; Reece Weinberg; Rex Kudo; Sir Dylan

Yung Lean chronology
Psykos (2024)	Jonatan (2025)

Singles from Jonatan
- 1. "Forever Yung" Released: 21 February 2025; 2. "Babyface Maniacs" Released: 28 March 2025

Jonatan is the fifth studio album by Swedish rapper Yung Lean. It was released through his record label, World Affairs and AWAL on 2 May 2025.

== Background and release ==
Jonatan was self-released through Yung Lean's independent label World Affairs on 2 May 2025.

== Critical reception ==
Professional ratings
Review scores
Source	Rating
Paste	7.0/10
RapReviews	6/10
Pitchfork	6.1/10
Sputnikmusic	2.2/5

Jonatan received a favorable review from Paste as well as mixed reviews from Pitchfork, RapReviews, and Sputnikmusic.

== Track listing ==
Jonatan track listing
No.	Title	Writer(s)	Producer(s)	Length
1.	"Jonatan Intro"	Jonatan Leandoer Håstad; Astrid Lindgren; Rami Dawod	Rami Dawod	1:19
2.	"Might Not B"	Håstad	Dawod; Rex Kudo; Reece Weinberg; Car!ton; Sir Dylan	2:46
3.	"Forever Yung"	Håstad; Dawod	Dawod	3:20
4.	"Horses"	Håstad; Dawod; Adam Feeney	Dawod; Ging	3:35
5.	"Paranoid Paparazzi"	Håstad; Dawod; Dylan Patrice Wiggins; Carlton McDowell; Reece Weinberg	Dawod; Sir Dylan; Car!ton; Reece Weinberg	3:16
6.	"Babyface Maniacs"	Emmanuel Hailemariam; Håstad; Dawod	Dawod; Emmanuel Hailemariam	3:41
7.	"I'm Your Dirt, I'm Your Love"	Håstad; Hailemariam; Dawod	Dawod; Hailemariam	2:51
8.	"Teenage Symphonies 4 God (God Will Only)"	Håstad; Dawod	Dawod	3:29
9.	"Changes"	Håstad; Dawod; Daniel Lopatin; Oscar Ulfheden; Simon Hessman	Dawod; Oneohtrix Point Never; Oscar Ulfheden; Eurohead	3:49
10.	"My Life"	Håstad	Dawod; Hailemariam	3:34
11.	"Swan Song"	Håstad; Feeney; Dawod; Beck David Hansen	Dawod; Ging	2:58
12.	"Terminator Symphony"	Håstad; Dawod; Lopatin	Dawod; Oneohtrix Point Never	1:42
13.	"Lessons from Above"	Håstad; Lindgren	Dawod; Marcus White	2:31
Total length:				38:56

== Charts ==
Chart performance for Jonatan
Chart (2025)	Peak position
Swedish Albums (Sverigetopplistan)	28
