= Ant Wan =

Swedish rapper (born 1998)

- Also known as: Ant Wan
- Born: Antwan Afram; January 1, 1998 (age 28); Västerås, Sweden
- Genres: Hip hop
- Occupations: Rapper, Songwriter
- Instrument: Vocals
- Years active: 2018 - 2025

Antwan Afram, (born 1 January 1998) known professionally as Ant Wan, is a Swedish rapper and songwriter. After initially releasing his first song in 2016, he has since achieved major success in the Swedish music scene.

Afram made a few songs in 2017 and later in 2018 changed his artist name to Ant Wan. His debut EP, Wow, was released in 2019 and included the tracks "Wow", "Kall", "Rikare", "Fendi" and "Boo", each of which reached the top of the Swedish Albums Chart. He has been described as a phenomenon by Swedish critics for seemingly coming from nothing to being one of the country's most successful rappers.

== Early life ==
Afram was born on New Year's Day, 1998 and was born to an Assyrian family originally from Syria. He grew up in the Råby area of Västerås, Sweden and released his first songs in 2016. His first song was titled Jett on Jett, and he initially released it under the same name of the area he grew up in (Råby), but he would later change his artist name to Ant Wan in 2018.

Afram first released the song "Sativa" in 2018, reaching #67 on the Sverigetopplistan and staying for 14 weeks. In 2019, Afram released his debut EP Wow, which contained five singles and had one single, "Kall", reach number two on the charts and bring the EP to the top spot, beginning his rise to fame. He would release his debut album, 724, the following year, reaching 2nd place on the charts and the main song of the album (under the same name) being certified platinum.

Afram previously glorified a gangster lifestyle in his work and persona, but later backtracked on this and has since kept a relatively low profile.

== Career ==
In 2022, Afram was featured alongside fellow Swedish rapper Yung Lean for the latter's single "Paradise Lost". The music video for the single featured Afram and Lean in a wooden chapel and a dimly-lit underground garage, and was released in May of that year.

In 2023, Afram performed his very first arena concert at the Avicii Arena, a concert which sold out the same day that tickets went on sale. The concert was organized with the online magazine DOPEST alongside German concert promoter FKP Scorpio.

In early 2024, Afram was awarded "Artist of the Year" as well as the "Guldmicken" award for Best Live Artist at the Swedish P3 Gold Awards. Despite him winning the awards at the event, Afram was not physically present at the ceremony.

In late 2024, Afram made headlines for performing a sold out concert at the Tele2 area in Stockholm, which set a new attendance record of 40,899 people. The attendance number of the concert broke the previous record that Madonna held of 40,577 since 2015, and he made history as being the first Swedish hip-hop artist to hold his own concert in the area. He would thank everyone in attendance at the concert, saying:

"For me, you are not fans, for me, you are my family. Whatever happens after the concert, if it ends, I will always love you."

=== Grammy rant controversy ===
In late 2022, although having been nominated for the Swedish Grammis, Afram took to Instagram in a public post, where he questioned why he wasn't nominated in all the categories before exclaiming, "Grammis and P3 can run their prizes up their asses". Although he was initially furious about having received only one nomination from the Grammis, he would later accept his award nominations from P3.

=== Album takedown ===
Early in 2024, it was noted that Afram's album Leylas World was temporarily taken down from Spotify due to a copyright claim on the song "Jag and Du". The album was later put back on the platform.

=== Retirement ===
On 16 May, 2025, Afram announced that he would be retiring from music and life as an artist. Writing on his Instagram page, Afram told his fans,

"I will never forget you and what we have achieved together, but it is time for me to live my life away from the cameras and spotlight."

Afram had his last solo performance at the 2025 edition of Sthlm (Stockholm) Fields on June 28th. On 1 August, Afram performed his last concert at the Dream Park Festival in Malmö.

== Discography ==
=== Studio albums ===
Title	Year	Peak positions	
Title	Year	SWE	NOR
724	2020	2	—
710 (Deluxe)	2020	4	—
Leylas World	2021	1	—
Wow 2	2021	1	38
The Only Wan	2022	1	30
The Only Wan (Deluxe)	2022	1	-
Wanderland	2024	1	23

=== Extended plays ===
Title	Year	Peak positions
Title	Year	SWE
Wow	2019	1
Ghettostar	2019	4
Kapitel 21	2019	1
For Those Who Believed	2024	1

=== Singles ===
==== As lead artist ====
Title	Year	Peak positions	Album
Title	Year	SWE	Album
"Sativa"	2018	67	Non-album singles
"Legend"	2018	99	Non-album singles
"Mitt liv"	2018	81	Non-album singles
"Kall"	2019	2	Wow
"Drip"	2019	7	Non-album singles
"Blessed"	2019	11	Non-album singles
"Designer" (with Lamix)	2019	33	A.D.H.D
"Mama"	2019	7	Ghettostar
"Ikon"	2019	24	Ghettostar
"Chubby Bunny"	2019	93	Non-album single
"Hon"	2019	14	Ghettostar
"Ya rab"	2019	15	Kapitel 21
"Cleopatra"	2019	24	Non-album single
"Ingen Autotune"	2020	53	724
"Goat"	2020	12	724
"Gango"	2020	38	724
"R.O.D" (with Matte Caliste, featuring Dave East)	2020	91	Non-album single
"Jag & du"	2020	18	Leylas World
"Mamacita"	2020	27	Non-album single
"Bars"	2020	22	Leylas World
"No Love"	2021	14	Leylas World
"Marbella"	2021	6	Wow 2
"Free"	2021	16	Non-album single
"Komplicerat"	2022	1	The Only Wan
"Habiba"	2022	6	The Only Wan
"Loyal"	2022	2	The Only Wan
"Dum"	2022	1	The Only Wan
"Gata"	2023	2	Non-album singles
"En till dans"	2023	3	Non-album singles
"Go"	2023	1	Non-album singles
"Sova"	2024	6	For Those Who Believed
"Faller"	2024	2	Non-album single
"Lover"	2024	2	Wanderland

=== Other charted songs ===
Title	Year	Peak positions	Album
Title	Year	SWE	Album
"Fendi"	2019	31	Wow
"Wow"	2019	52	Wow
"Rikare"	2019	65	Wow
"Boo"	2019	— (Note: "Boo" did not enter the Sverigetopplistan, but peaked at number five on the Swedish Heatseeker chart.)	Wow
"Ghettostar"	2019	31	Ghettostar
"Livsstil"	2019	56	Ghettostar
"Kokain City"	2019	61	Ghettostar
"Flera Days"	2019	63	Ghettostar
"Thug"	2019	74	Ghettostar
"Va mig"	2019	7	Kapitel 21
"Je t'aime"	2019	21	Kapitel 21
"Maria"	2019	40	Kapitel 21
"724"	2020	9	724
"Madame"	2020	26	724
"Fukushima"	2020	56	724
"Annan kaliber"	2020	60	724
"Bang bang"	2020	61	724
"Dyin"	2020	67	724
"Modigliani"	2020	80	724
"Vit Cola"	2020	95	724
"Lalala"	2020	— (Note: "Lalala" did not enter the Swedish Singellista Chart, but peaked at number 12 on the Swedish Heatseeker Chart.)	724
"Kopior"	2020	— (Note: "Kopior" did not enter the Swedish Singellista Chart, but peaked at number 14 on the Swedish Heatseeker Chart.)	724
"Immanu El"	2020	— (Note: "Immanu El" did not enter the Swedish Singellista Chart, but peaked at number 15 on the Swedish Heatseeker Chart.)	724
"Puss"	2020	48	724 (Deluxe)
"1942"	2021	4	Leylas World
"Malaika"	2021	11	Leylas World
"Dom Pérignon"	2021	45	Leylas World
"Wavy"	2021	52	Leylas World
"Magic"	2021	54	Leylas World
"Leylas World"	2021	66	Leylas World
"Shot Caller"	2021	75	Leylas World
"Heartbreaker"	2021	14	Wow 2
"5AM"	2021	19	Wow 2
"Innan musiken"	2021	22	Wow 2
"Wenak"	2021	5	Wow 2
"Live n Learn"	2021	34	Wow 2
"Jayzee"	2021	33	Wow 2
"Walkin"	2021	36	Wow 2
"En"	2022	7	The Only Wan
"Med dig"	2022	20	The Only Wan
"Testa"	2022	21	The Only Wan
"Dexter"	2022	22	The Only Wan
"Hennessy"	2022	17	The Only Wan
"Kärlek"	2022	17	The Only Wan
"Drama"	2022	26	The Only Wan
"22 Freestyle"	2022	34	The Only Wan
"Misstag"	2024	18	For Those Who Believed
"Mirakel"	2024	26	For Those Who Believed
"Kokaina"	2024	40	For Those Who Believed
"Luv"	2024	16	For Those Who Believed
"Legacy"	2024	29	For Those Who Believed
"Guten Tag"	2024	56	Wanderland
"Sweden"	2024	20	Wanderland
"Marisol"	2024	49	Wanderland
"Bad Boy"	2024	34	Wanderland
"Wesh"	2024	58	Wanderland
"Toxic"	2024	51	Wanderland
"24 Freestyle"	2024	61	Wanderland
"Hur"	2024	88	Wanderland
"SOS"	2024	33	Wanderland
"Fatti"	2024	66	Wanderland
