= Warlord (album) =

Studio album by Yung Lean
- Released: 25 February 2016
- Recorded: 2015
- Studios: First sessions at The Pink House, Miami Beach. Later sessions in Stockholm.
- Genre: Cloud rap
- Length: 41:42
- Label: YEAR0001
- Producers: Yung Gud; Yung Sherman; Whitearmor; Mike Dean; Karman

Yung Lean chronology
Unknown Memory (2014)	Warlord (2016)	Frost God (2016)

Singles from Warlord
- 1. "Hoover" Released: 20 January 2016; 2. "AF1s" Released: 3 February 2016

Warlord is the second studio album by Swedish rapper Yung Lean. It was released on 25 February 2016 by YEAR0001. It was recorded between spring and autumn 2015, across Florida and Stockholm. A deluxe edition was released on 28 April 2016.

== Critical reception ==
Professional ratings
Review scores
Source	Rating
Crack Magazine	5/10
HipHopDX	3.4/5

Steve Mallon of Crack Magazine wrote that "As with much of Lean’s output, tracks like Fantasy, Highway Patrol and Afghanistan feature crystalline instrumentals, but are let down by uninspired lyricism and stilted delivery" while Ural Garrett of HipHopDX said "Regardless of some unintentional missteps, Warlord explores the mind of a man already turned cynical toward fame, even if it’s only by the binary codes of the web."

== Track listing ==
All tracks are written by Yung Lean.

No.	Title	Producer(s)	Length
1.	"Immortal"	Yung Gud	2:28
2.	"Highway Patrol" (featuring Bladee)	Yung Sherman; Yung Gud; Mike Dean	3:33
3.	"Fantasy" (featuring Lil Flash)	Yung Sherman; Yung Gud; Karman	3:09
4.	"Afghanistan"	Yung Gud; Whitearmor	2:47
5.	"Hoover"	Yung Gud	2:39
6.	"Fire"	Whitearmor	3:08
7.	"Stay Down"	Yung Sherman; Yung Gud	3:13
8.	"Eye Contact"	Whitearmor	3:41
9.	"More Stacks"	Yung Sherman; Yung Gud; Dean	3:23
10.	"AF1s" (featuring Ecco2k)	Yung Sherman; Yung Gud	3:41
11.	"Hocus Pocus" (featuring Bladee)	Yung Sherman; Yung Gud	3:31
12.	"Shawty U Know What It Do"	Yung Sherman; Whitearmor	2:11
13.	"Miami Ultras"	Yung Sherman; Yung Gud	4:24
Total length:			41:42

Deluxe edition bonus tracks
No.	Title	Producer(s)	Length
1.	"Sippin" (featuring ManeMane4CGG)	Acea; Woesum	4:10
2.	"God Only Knows"	Acea; Woesum	3:34
3.	"How U Like Me Now?" (featuring Thaiboy Digital)	Yung Gud	3:53
4.	"Pearl Fountain" (featuring Black Kray and Bladee)	Yung Sherman; Acea	3:14
5.	"Stars Align"	Yung Sherman	4:23
6.	"Shine"	Acea; Woesum	4:51
Total length:			65:47
