= Yung Sherman =

Swedish DJ and music producer

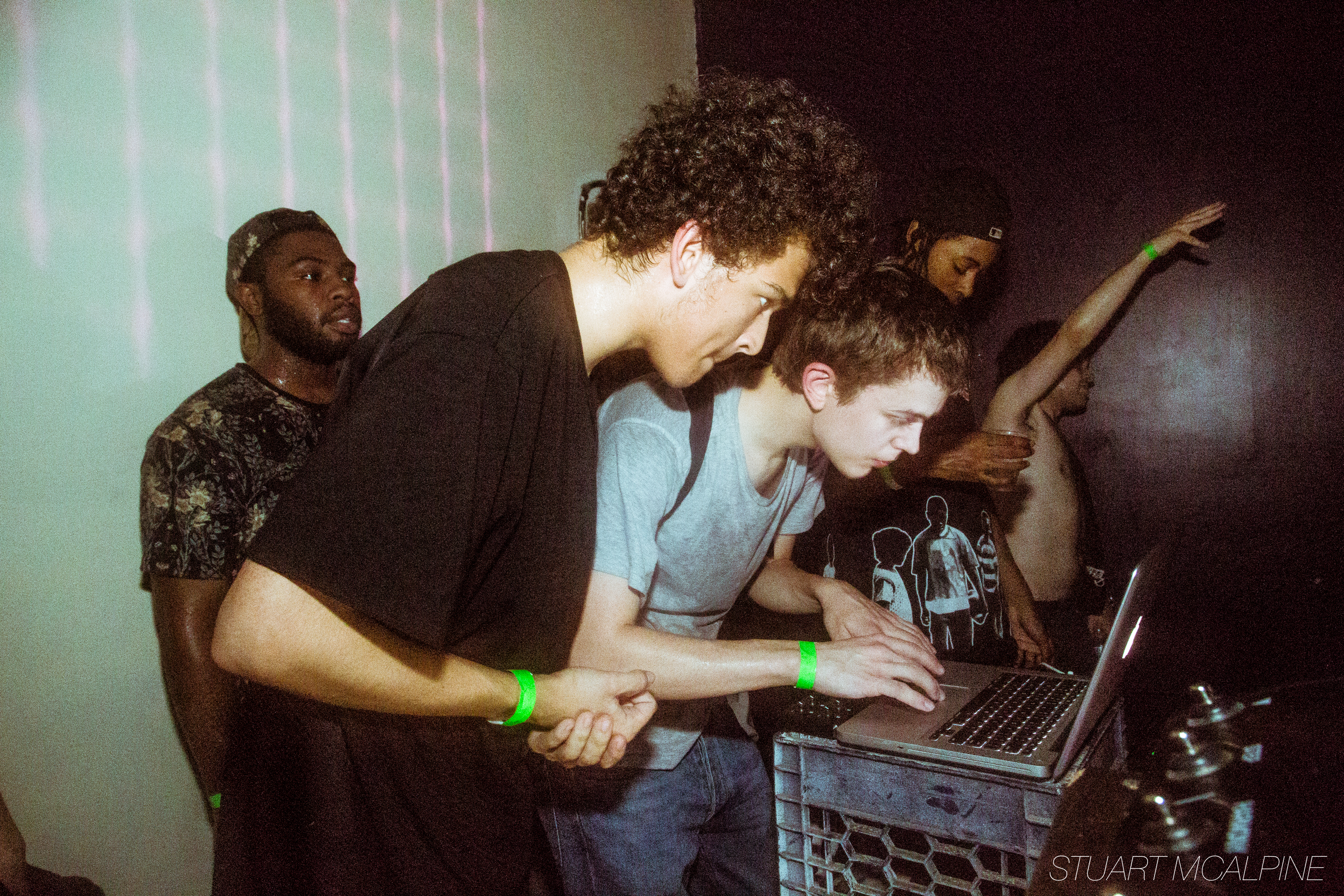
- Gud (left) and Yung Sherman (right) in 2014

Background information
- Also known as: Yung Sherman
- Born: Axel Tufvesson; Stockholm, Sweden
- Genres: Cloud rap; electronic; trance; hip hop; trap
- Years active: 2012–present
- Label: YEAR0001
- Member of: Sad Boys
- Formerly of: Drain Gang

Axel Tufvesson, known professionally as Yung Sherman, is a Swedish music producer and DJ. Alongside Yung Lean and Gud, he is a member of the Stockholm-based rap group Sad Boys.

== Early life and education ==
Axel Tufvesson was born in Stockholm, Sweden.

== Career ==
Tufvesson first began making music around 2012; it was around this time that he met the other members of Sad Boys, Yung Lean and Yung Gud through mutual friends, including Ecco2k. Gud coined Tufvesson's stage name Yung Sherman from the Ben Sherman shirt he was wearing. By 2014, they were performing and recording together as Sad Boys, which gained prominence in the cloud rap scene. Sad Boys are "closely aligned" with Drain Gang, and are known for distinctive SBE apparel, produced with various collaborators.

Tufvesson has contributed to Yung Lean's albums, including Warlord, Starz and Stranger. Tufvesson has also produced songs for Bladee, and appeared on his 2024 album Cold Visions. Tufvesson's production on Warlord was described by Malcolm Jack in The Guardian as "a twisted, trippy brew that eschews gunshot sample-heavy hip-hop cliche to blend retro 808 beats, witch-y house and a serrated, narcotic take on sombre Scandi synth-pop".

In May 2013 Tufvesson collaborated with DJ Haydn on a track called "Shut It Down".

In 2017, Tufvesson released two solo EPs, Innocence and Innocence V2, under the label YEAR0001. Most Sad Boys tracks have been released under the YEAR0001 label; however, Yung Lean announced in November 2024 that they were leaving the label, and that his future releases would be under his own label, World Affairs.

Tufvesson co-produced, with Woesum, the track "Heartfelt" on the American rapper Xaviersobased's debut album Xavier, released in January 2026.

=== Style and recognition ===
In July 2013, writing for Interview, Ryan Hemsworth wrote that Tufvesson "is to rapper Yung Lean what 40 is to Drake—someone who needs to be in the kitchen at all times that Lean is". Also for Interview, writing in December of that year, Alex Chapman described Tufvesson's music as "incorporating eccentric, melancholy and sometimes even obscurely exultant sounds with the types of bass and snare big producers would die for". Abel van Gijlswijk, writing for Vice, described it in 2015 as "sickeningly layered".

== Other activities ==
Tufvesson modelled for an Adidas Spring/Summer 2025 collection.

== Discography ==
=== EPs ===
- Innocence (2017)
- Innocence V2 (2018)

=== Singles ===
- "Ultra" (Yung Sherman remix) (2020)
- "Drown Me" (2015)
- "You are a star in my sky and i will love you forever more" (2014)
- "Buddha93" (2013, with Whitearmor)
