= Gud (music producer) =

Swedish DJ and music producer

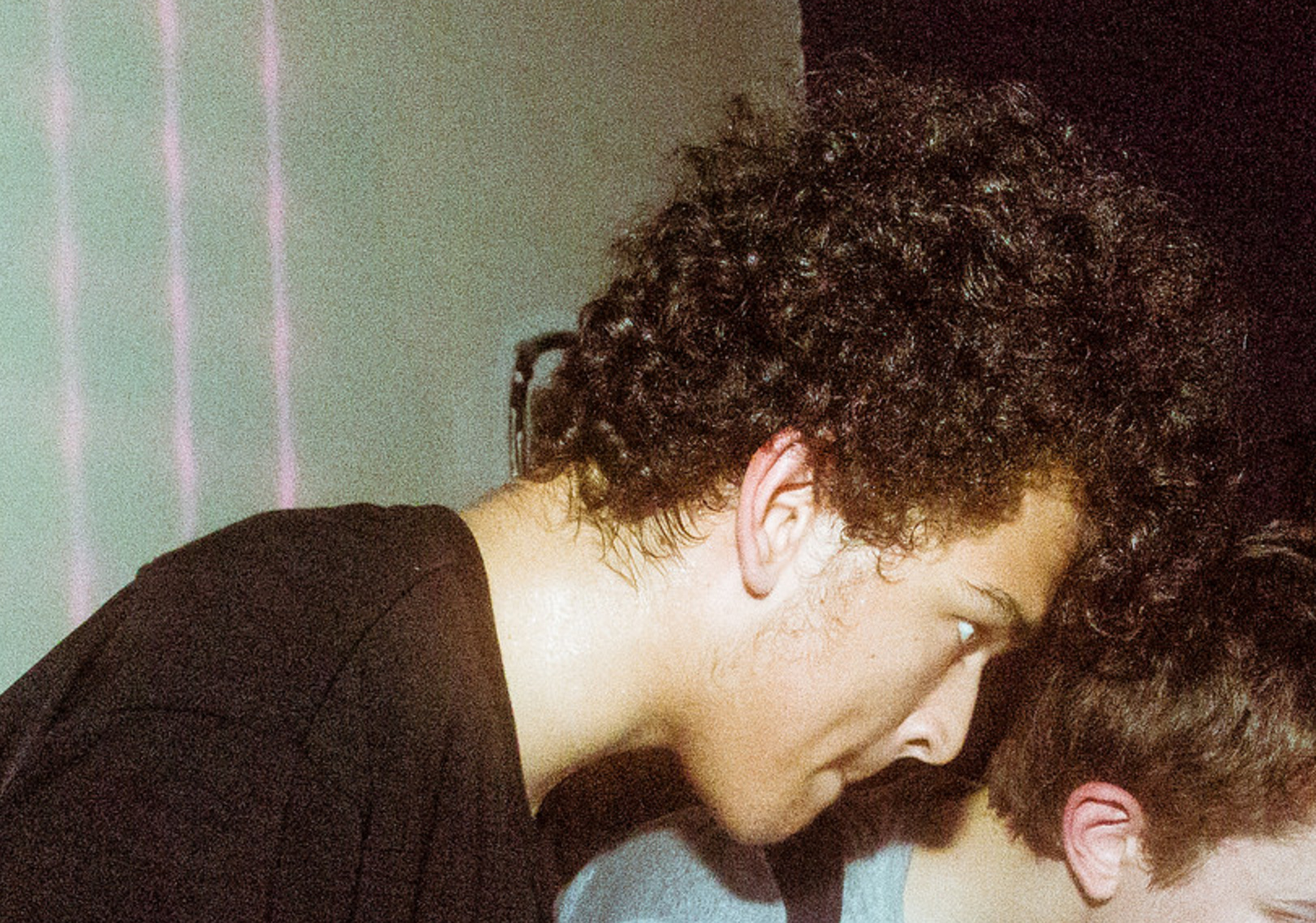
- Gud in 2014

Background information
- Also known as: Yung Gud; Aamu Kuu; Rooster
- Born: Carl-Mikael Göran Berlander; August 29, 1995 (age 31); Stockholm, Sweden
- Genres: Electronic; trance; hip hop; trap
- Years active: 2012–present
- Labels: Sky Team; YEAR0001
- Member of: Sad Boys; Död Mark

Carl-Mikael Göran "Micke" Berlander (born 29 August 1995), known professionally as Gud (formerly known as Yung Gud), is a Swedish DJ, music producer and rapper best known as a member of a Stockholm-based group Sad Boys along with Yung Lean and Yung Sherman, which later transitioned into Drain Gang, with members Bladee, Ecco2k, Thaiboy Digital and producer Whitearmor. He began producing at the age of twelve, making psychedelic trance music, which heavily influenced his sonic palette. His production as a part of Sad Boys has been well received.

Outside of his role in Sad Boys, he has released an EP, named Beautiful, Wonderful, and a collaborative album, Foreign Exchange, with American rapper Rx Papi. Under his alternate persona/alias Rooster he has released one EP, Rooster Debut, and one album Rooster Slipped. He has acted as a producer for several acts including Halsey, and has also remixed several songs for other artists such as Jacques Greene, Kacy Hill, and Tinashe. These remixes have also garnered a positive critical response from publications including Pigeons & Planes and The Fader.

== Early life ==
Berlander was born in Stockholm in 1995. Following his parents' divorce when he was ten, his dad and his older sister moved to a Stockholm suburb different to where he was living at the time. Berlander, as well as the other members of the Sad Boys group, have described living in Stockholm as "boring" and "miserable". While he has resided in the city for most of his life, Berlander had once lived in a small urban area called Gnesta, which he opined to be a Swedish equivalent to Kentucky: "Stupid people and alcohol problems, I don't know. It sucks of over there. It's so boring." He said that his mother "liked to spoil me." Berlander is part of a mixed race family, since his Nigerian grandfather met his grandmother, who was a Swede, in London. He said that his identity of his mixed race made him feel like he was "on this little island".

He did not do well in school, dropping out to pursue a career in music, and his father has always been mixed on this decision; he had always encouraged him to "just go to school and be a good person", saying that "You can't make music without a guitar. However, Berlander said in a 2014 interview that his dad had been getting a little more supportive and into what he had been doing so far. He also claimed in that same interview that he is sober, although, he said that he was wanting to try promethazine "because it's medicine. But the weeds and the speeds – no, not that".

== Musical career ==
=== 2012–2015: Origins and early work ===
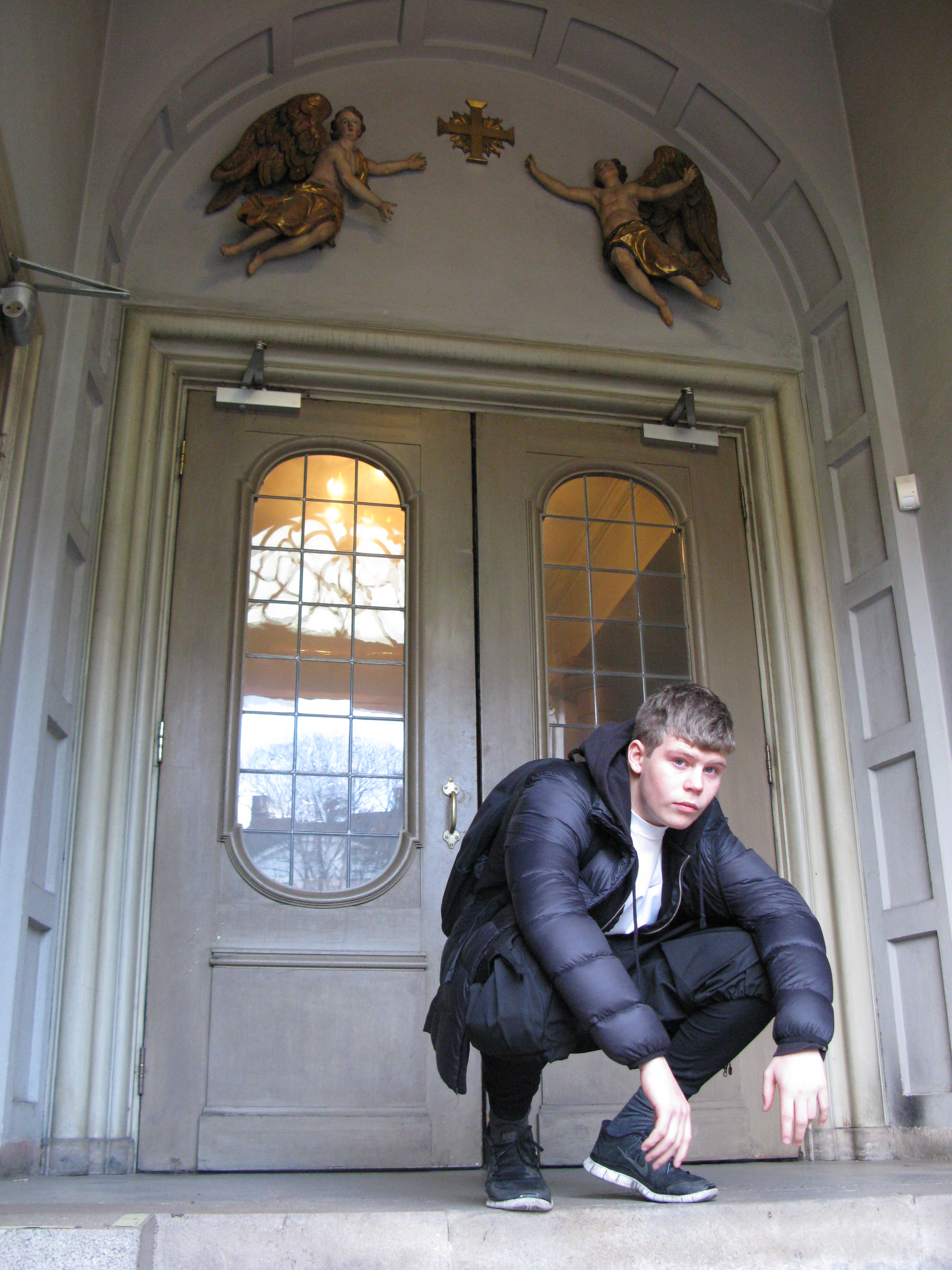
Yung Lean in Stockholm in 2013

In 2012, Berlander formed Sad Boys with rapper Yung Lean and fellow producer Yung Sherman. In a 2014 interview, Berlander recounted meeting Yung Lean: "my friend was fucking his friend at the moment. And she introduced him to my friend and me and basically that's how I met him. We'd drank some beer in a park and were like, "We like the same music, we should do something sometime"". The two had always thought of creating material together, but the two didn't start doing so until around October 2012 with the track "Oreomilkshake", "I think we were drunk in his basement and we made "Oreomilkshake." Then I just made some beats when I had the time". The collective's name, Sad Boys, came about Berlander: "was going to buy some clothes at a store with Yung Sherman, and it was closed, and I got sad, and basically that's that". Berlander's stage name at the time, Yung Gud, came about when he had come up with the word Gud, then decided to add the Yung to make it funnier, which he later described as "a stupid decision". Berlander's production for Yung Lean's works has garnered favorable responses from critics, with some spotlighting how it complements Lean's rapping, and according to a journalist, his "lush" and "melodic" beats were a major part of the listeners' appeal towards Lean.

Early on, Berlander liked Yung Lean's style of rapping, commenting that he has gotten more "secure" as a rapper as time goes on. In the same interview, he disagreed with Lean's common comparison to Lil B, although he did comprehend why this comparison was made early on in Yung Lean's career. To this, Berlander added: "there is always something wrong about him. It's like something wrong about the whole Sad Boys thing. People get really, really angry or really happy when they hear it. That's his main attraction. He's going to make people feel some type of way".

While touring with the Sad Boys during the popularity of Yung Lean's 2014 album Unknown Memory, Berlander began suffering from abuse from using stimulants like cocaine, as well as the benzodiazepine anxiety medication xanax as other members of the group did. This led to him not able to "recognize [himself] anymore". As a result, he decided to return to Sweden to spend time with his family.

In 2014, Berlander released two remixes of "No Excuse", a track by Canadian producer Jacques Greene. On 30 May 2014, The Fader premiered the recut that was a part of a remix extended play for Greene's three-track record Phantom Vibrate. The magazine described it as a "ecstatically pattering" rework of the song that alleviates "the jagged turns and gun shot sounds of the original to reveal its lushest sonic innards." Joe Price, writing for Complex's website Pigeons & Planes, said that with this remix, Berlander had "proven once again that he has legs beyond what many coin as "meme rap."" Later on, Berlander did a much more harsh-sounding "VIP" remix of the track, which starts off alike to Berlander's first remix, and then it dives "into a deep chasm of rumbling bass complete with a hammering rhythm that rarely lets up", Price wrote. It was issued on 20 December, garnering 800,000 plays in eighteen days on SoundCloud. Berlander's "spacey and dreamy" re-edit for "2 On" by Tinashe, which came out on 6 September 2014, was reviewed by a Complex magazine critic who highlighted its "interesting drum work" and Tinashe's vocal performance fitting with the beat.

Berlander made a track called "Crushed", a song that's part of a genre he made up called "crushcore". This was "So people won't call it post-witchhouse-chill-step or dub-core with emo influences. Or they won't say, 'This track is cool, but can you make it more based?' It's like, 'This is crushcore. Fuck off'". On 5 June 2014, Berlander announced that he had finished his debut extended play the past week, and had been looking for a label to release it: "I don't want to keep people waiting anymore. I don't want to keep myself waiting". He had also stated he was thinking of naming the record either Wonderful or Beautiful. The now-titled four-track Beautiful, Wonderful was available for streaming worldwide via The Fader on 24 November 2014. The Sky Team label released it in European stores that same day, and to markets in the United States on 25 November. As Berlander described, "I've always wanted to make a product of some sort. So with this EP, I'm finally selling a specific sound and look to the people that have been supporting my music for the past year and a half". Beautiful, Wonderful received a positive review from Andrew Ryce of Resident Advisor, who scored the release a 3.5 out of five: "His solo tracks have a stargazing majesty to them, but the melodies are nailed down with grandiose percussion that makes it feel almost symphonic". The EP was promoted with a ten-day European tour lasting from 12–22 November.

A Complex magazine critic made note of the lack of popularity of Berlander's career outside of Sad Boys, writing that "there's no reason this should be on the low, though, because the works are fire".

=== 2015–2020: Collaborations with Drain Gang and remixes ===
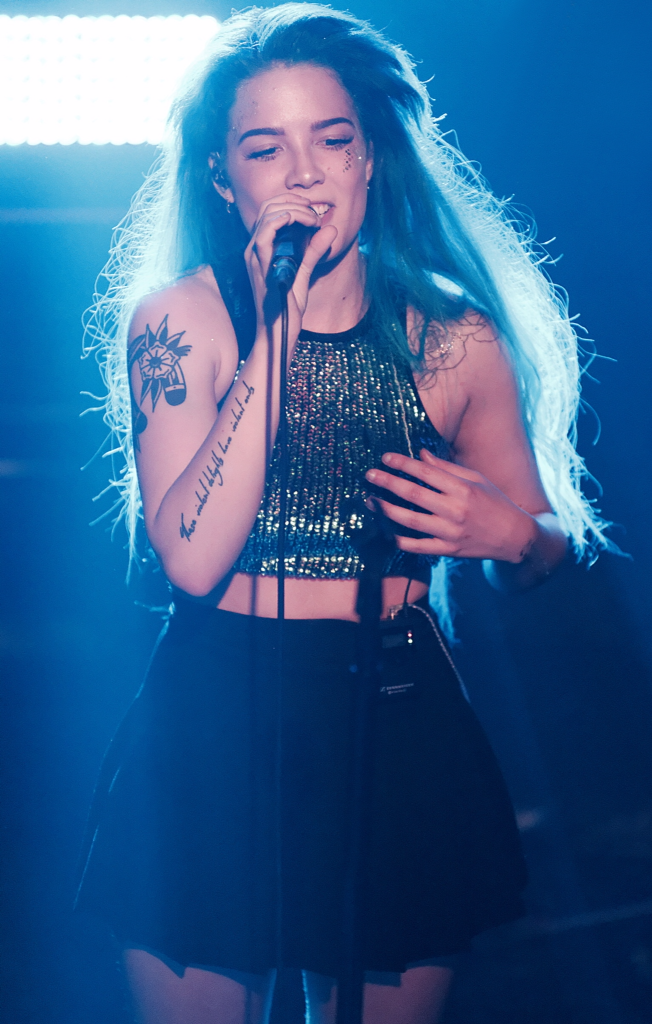
Berlander has done production work for acts including Halsey.

Berlander collaborated with S-Type of the LuckyMe record label for the song "Fire", which was released on The Fader on 9 February 2015 as a single off S-Type's EP SV8. "Fire" was also the opener for Astrid Anderson's FW15 show, which S-Type soundtracked for. The two talked about making a track together when they first met each other at one of the Sad Boys concerts, and Berlander made some drum parts and sent them to S-Type for him to "do my thing with" two weeks later. Production credits have included rapper Deniro Farrar's single "World On My Shoulders 3.0", which premiered on 27 April 2015, "Blue Prada" by Prada Mane and additional production on "Strange Love", a track by singer Halsey off the deluxe edition of her debut album Badlands.

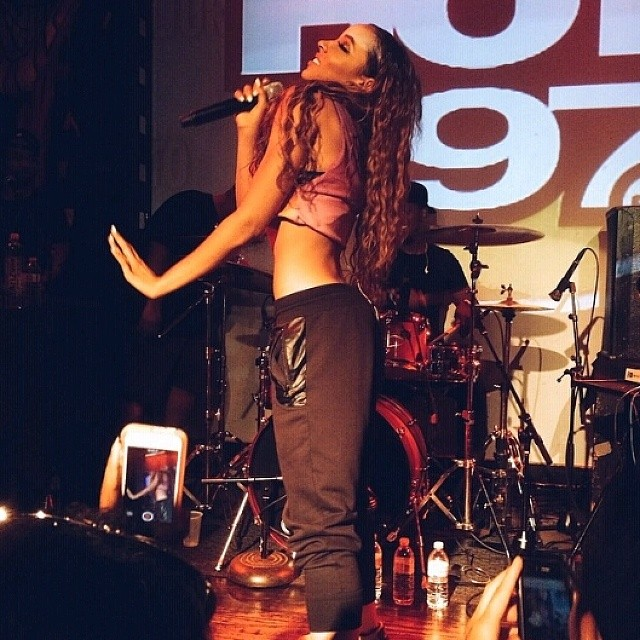
Berlander has done remix work for songs by artists including Tinashe.

In 2015, Berlander released two remixes. On 28 June, Berlander did a remix of rapper Meek Mill's track "Monster". Constant Gardner of Pigeons & Planes made note of the re-cut's "chest-shaking" bass, a layer of "icy" synth lines and "twinkling" glockenspiel-style sounds, and also said that "This is Meek Mill taken from the streets of Philly to his throne in a sparkling Arctic ice palace, and it's awesome." Berlander remixed Kacy Hill's "Foreign Fields", which the re-edit was released on 30 September as a promotional single of her debut EP Bloo. A Pigeons & Planes journalist wrote that Berlander's reworking turns the original song "into a grand experience", opining that it takes it into "new heights with heavier basslines and haunting production". A Stuff.co.nz critic compared his Foreign Fields remix to Katy Perry's track "Dark Horse" due to "some nature sounds and a marching band drum beat".

On 22 June 2016, Vice Media's electronic music channel Thump premiered "Body Horror," Berlander's first original track in two years. It, according to Thump, is an "obfuscated, hazy R&B through a grab bag of blemishing distortion techniques, decorating it with light discordance and snippets of ravey synth patches for texture. Fittingly, it shares its name with a style of fiction known for its gut-churning corporeal thrills". Berlander also changed his stage name from Yung Gud to simply Gud, "a symbol of his development and growth as an artist" according to Hypetrak.

Berlander produced nine tracks on Thaiboy Digital's 2019 album Legendary Member, some of which were co-produced by Whitearmor. In the same year, Berlander also produced seven tracks on Ecco2k's album E.

In 2019, Berlander produced the entirety of Bladee's third studio album Exeter. The album released in April 2020.

On 14 July 2020, Gud released a collaborative double single titled "Frutta E Verdura" with longtime friend and collaborator Whitearmor.

=== 2021–present: Foreign Exchange and Rooster Slipped ===
On 19 November 2021, Berlander released a collaborative album, Foreign Exchange, with Rochester-based rapper Rx Papi.

On 28 October 2022, Berlander, as Rooster, released a five-track EP titled Rooster Debut. The EP was followed up by a double single titled "Ssstupid / The End of the World" on 23 August 2023.

On 2 June 2023, Connecticut-based rapper RealYungPhil released an album titled Victory Music, featuring six tracks produced by Berlander.

On 28 August 2025, Berlander released his debut album under the Rooster moniker titled Rooster Slipped. The following month on 22 September, Berlander and frequent collaborator Woesum released a collaborative single with London-based electronic duo Bassvictim titled "Walk Hard - G string edit".

On 12 November 2026, Ecco2k released his second solo studio album, Echo, on which Berlander produced four tracks.

== Artistry and influences ==
Berlander has described his influences of music as generally "left-field". He and his sister first listened to nu metal bands like Slipknot and Korn since he was eight or nine years old. He then got into electronic music and was producing psychedelic trance since he was twelve, which the genre has always been an influence for his works along with other styles of music involving ambient. However, in a 2014 interview with Red Bull Music Academy, he stated that he didn't start listening to hip hop until a couple of years before. He first used a Sony Ericsson music application, and once he was bought an expensive computer by his mother, he started "really making shit" with the program GarageBand before moving on to Fruity Loops and other programs, and now uses Ableton Live.

In the Red Bull interview, Berlander cited Lil Wayne, Young Thug, Andre 3000, Nas and Lil Ugly Mane as his favorite rappers, and when asked about his "dream collaboration[s]", he named Drake, PartyNextDoor, and FKA twigs. Clams Casino has been a common comparison with Berlander's works, which he addressed in that, like Yung Lean's frequent juxtaposition with Lil B, "It's their only reference because everything else they listen to is straight hip hop. They don't know all the shit that I hear in Clams Casino. They don't hear what he's influenced by. For me, it's like he's just one of them all".

When asked on how often he makes music, Berlander responded:

"Sometimes I don't do it for months; sometimes I do it all day every day. But it's been the only thing I can think about for six years. I don't care about anything else. [...] I care about a lot of things, but I wouldn't care about all of the other things if I didn't make music. All of the other things are based on me doing music in some shape or form. Everything else in life becomes okay or fun if I can do this. If I couldn't do this I'd lay down forever, put a pillow over my head and just lay there. I'd eat and shower maybe once a week, but I'd be posted in one spot forever".

== Discography ==
=== Albums ===
- Foreign Exchange (with Rx Papi) (2021)
- Rooster Slipped (as Rooster) (2025)

=== EPs ===
- Beautiful, Wonderful (2014)
- Frutta e Verdura (with Whitearmor) (2020)
- Rooster Debut (as Rooster) (2022)

=== Singles ===
- "Body Horror" (2016)
- "Vive La France / AAA" (as Aamu Kuu) (2021)
- "Ssstupid / The End of the World" (as Rooster) (2023)

== Production credits ==
=== Yung Lean - Warlord (2016) ===
- 01. "Immortal"
- 02. "Highway Patrol" (co-produced with Whitearmor, Yung Sherman, Mike Dean)
- 04. "Afghanistan" (co-produced with Whitearmor)
- 05. "Hoover"
- 07. "Stay Down" (co-produced with Yung Sherman)
- 09. "More Stacks" (co-produced with Yung Sherman)
- 10. "Af1s" (co-produced with Yung Sherman)
- 11. "Hocus Pocus" (co-produced with Yung Sherman)
- 13. "Miami Ultras" (co-produced with Yung Sherman)
- 16. "How U Like Me Now?"

=== Drain Gang and Yung Lean - D&G (2017) ===
- 17. "Climbing" (co-produced with Whitearmor)

=== Yung Lean - Stranger (2017) ===
- 02. "Red Bottom Sky"
- 03. "Skimask"
- 04. "Silver Arrows" (co-produced with Whitearmor)
- 05. "Metallic Intuition"
- 06. "Push / Lost Weekend"
- 08. "Drop It / Scooter" (co-produced with Whitearmor)
- 09. "Hunting My Own Skin" (co-produced with Whitearmor)
- 11. "Snakeskin / Bullets"
- 13. "Agony"
- 14. "Yellowman" (co-produced with Yung Sherman)

=== Huncho Jack - Huncho Jack, Jack Huncho (2017) ===
- 08. "Dubai Shit" (co-produced with Vinylz, OZ and Yung Lean)

=== Thaiboy Digital - Legendary Member (2019) ===
- 02. "Nervous"
- 03. "Can't Tell" (co-produced with Woesum)
- 04. "Kiss Me Through the Scope"
- 05. "IDGAF" (co-produced with Whitearmor)
- 07. "Kit Kat"
- 08. "Lip Service"
- 09. "Beijing" (co-produced with Whitearmor)
- 10. "Spinnin" (co-produced with Whitearmor)
- 11. "Baby (Legendary Member)" (produced with Woesum and Whitearmor)

=== Ecco2k - E (2019) ===
- 02. "Peroxide"
- 03. "Fragile"
- 04. "Bliss Fields"
- 06. "Cc" (co-produced with Whitearmor)
- 10. "Security!" (co-produced with Mechatok)
- 11. "Time"
- 12. "Blue Eyes"

=== Bladee - Exeter (2020) ===
Entirely produced by Berlander.

=== Bladee - 333 (2020) ===
- 08. "Reality Surf" (co-produced with Whitearmor)

=== Bladee - Spiderr (2022) ===
- 07. "Disaster Prelude" (featuring Ecco2k) (co-produced with Whitearmor)

=== RealYungPhil - Victory Music (2023) ===
- 01. "I'm Not Them"
- 02. "I Had Enough"
- 05. "Opening Doors"
- 06. "Talk of the Town"
- 09. "Winners Circle"
- 10. "Victory Music"

=== Subaru & HC - "CARGLASS" (2026) ===
- "CARGLASS"

=== Ecco2k - "Aldehydes and Ketones" (2026) ===
- "Aldehydes and Ketones"
