= Yung Lean =

Swedish rapper (born 1996)

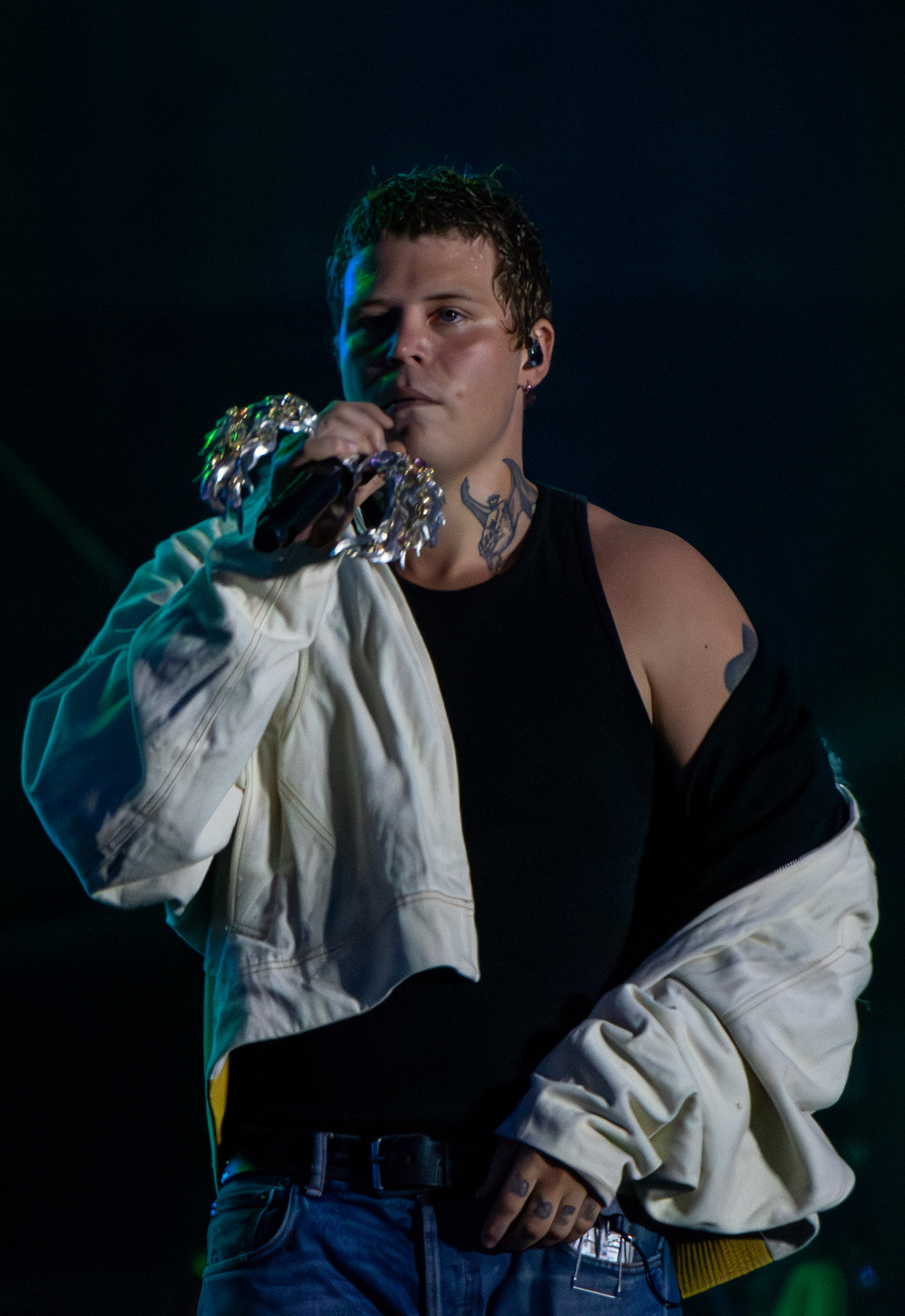
- Yung Lean in 2024

Background information
- Also known as: jonatan leandoer96
- Born: Jonatan Aron Leandoer Håstad; 18 July 1996 (age 30); Stockholm, Sweden
- Genres: Hip hop; cloud rap; emo rap; SoundCloud rap
- Occupations: Rapper; singer; songwriter
- Years active: 2012–present
- Labels: Sad Boys Entertainment; Mishka NYC; Sky Team; Year0001; World Affairs
- Member of: Sad Boys; Död Mark
- Website: yunglean.com

Jonatan Aron Leandoer Håstad (born 18 July 1996), known professionally as Yung Lean, is a Swedish rapper and singer. Known for his experimental approach to hip-hop, Yung Lean has been widely credited as a pioneer of the cloud rap and emo rap genres.

Yung Lean rose to prominence in 2013 with his song "Ginseng Strip 2002", which went viral on YouTube. He released the mixtapes Unknown Death 2002 (2013), Frost God (2016), Poison Ivy (2018) and Stardust (2022), and the studio albums Unknown Memory (2014), Warlord (2016), Stranger (2017), Starz (2020), Psykos (2024) and Jonatan (2025). He has also released music under the pseudonym Jonatan Leandoer96, exploring genres outside his established hip-hop sound. Alongside producers Yung Gud and Yung Sherman, he is a founding member of the Swedish musical collective Sad Boys.

== Early life ==
Håstad was born on 18 July 1996 in Stockholm, Sweden, to Kristoffer Leandoer, a Swedish poet, fantasy author, and translator of French literature who owned a book publishing company and Elsa Håstad, a former human rights activist who worked with LGBT groups in Russia, Vietnam, and South America, serving as the Swedish ambassador to Albania from 2019 to 2023. He said in an interview with the New York Times that his grandfather was Jewish.

Håstad spent his early childhood in Belarus, where his mother moved the family partially so that Håstad could have a similar childhood to hers. The family returned to Sweden and settled in Stockholm when Håstad was somewhere between the ages of three and five. He was raised in the city's Södermalm area. In between, Håstad was a student at UNIS Hanoi from 6th to 10th grade. During his time in high school, Håstad often got in trouble for doing drugs or writing graffiti. He also had a job at a local McDonald's. When he was 15, he was put on probation for smoking cannabis. Håstad began to develop an interest in hip hop music, later mentioning 50 Cent's Get Rich or Die Tryin', The Latin Kings's Mitt Kvarter and Nas's Illmatic as his early influences. Håstad was classmates with Bladee's younger brother, Gus Reichwald, in the 9th grade, with Håstad having noticed Reichwald wearing Billionaire Boys Club and Gucci Mane merchandise. Reichwald told Håstad his older brother had influenced him to wear these brands, and later introduced the two.

== Career ==
=== 2012–2013: Career beginnings, Lavender and Unknown Death 2002 ===
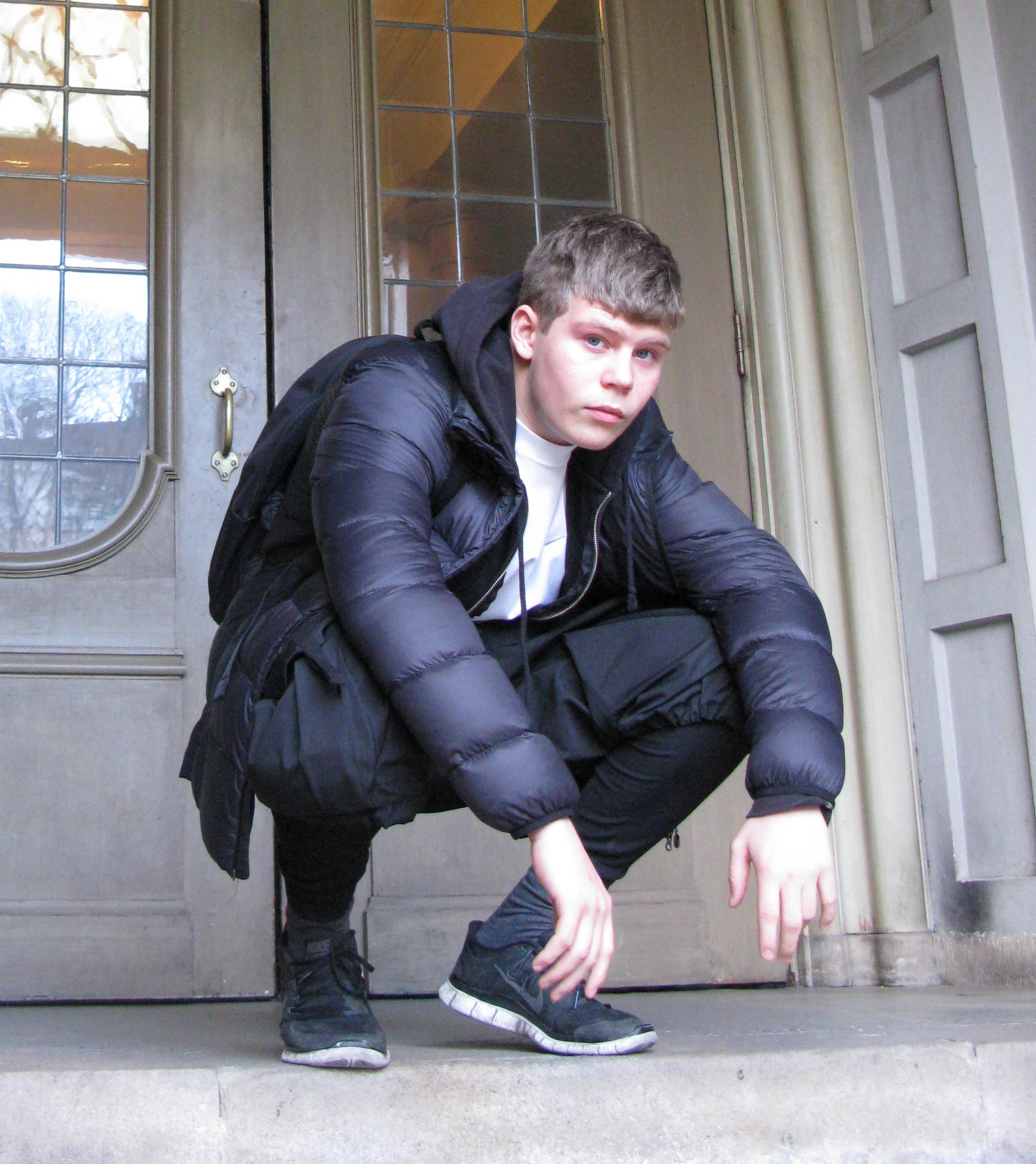
Yung Lean in 2013

Håstad, Yung Sherman and Yung Gud eventually formed the group "Sad Boys" as a trio. By 2012, Yung Gud and Yung Sherman were producing and mixing music while Håstad had begun writing lyrics and recording vocals in a makeshift studio in his basement. They shared the music they made on the platforms SoundCloud and Tumblr, where Lean began to generate a large following. Sad Boys performed their first show at Röda Sten Konsthall in Gothenburg, Sweden on 5 May 2013.

Yung Lean became widely known when the music video for his track "Ginseng Strip 2002" went viral. Later in 2013, he put out his first official releases: Marble Phone, a single featuring Kreayshawn, Unknown Death 2002 and an EP titled Lavender which includes the track "Ginseng Strip 2002" along with other songs that were cut from Unknown Death 2002. Consequence of Sound placed "Ginseng Strip 2002" at number 44 on their "Top 50 Songs of 2013", while Vibe included Unknown Death 2002 in their list, "The 10 Most Overlooked Debut Rap Mixtapes of 2013", describing it as "a natural progression from the freely associative, often nonsensical rhymes of Lil' B with a keener sense of melody".

In 2013, Yung Lean and Sad Boys toured throughout Europe. Later that same year, Acclaim Magazine had Yung Lean as their guest for a Q&A "smalltalk" segment, where they asked him about a wide variety of miscellaneous things, including his favourite hangover cure and his desktop wallpaper.

=== 2014–2016: Unknown Memory and Warlord ===
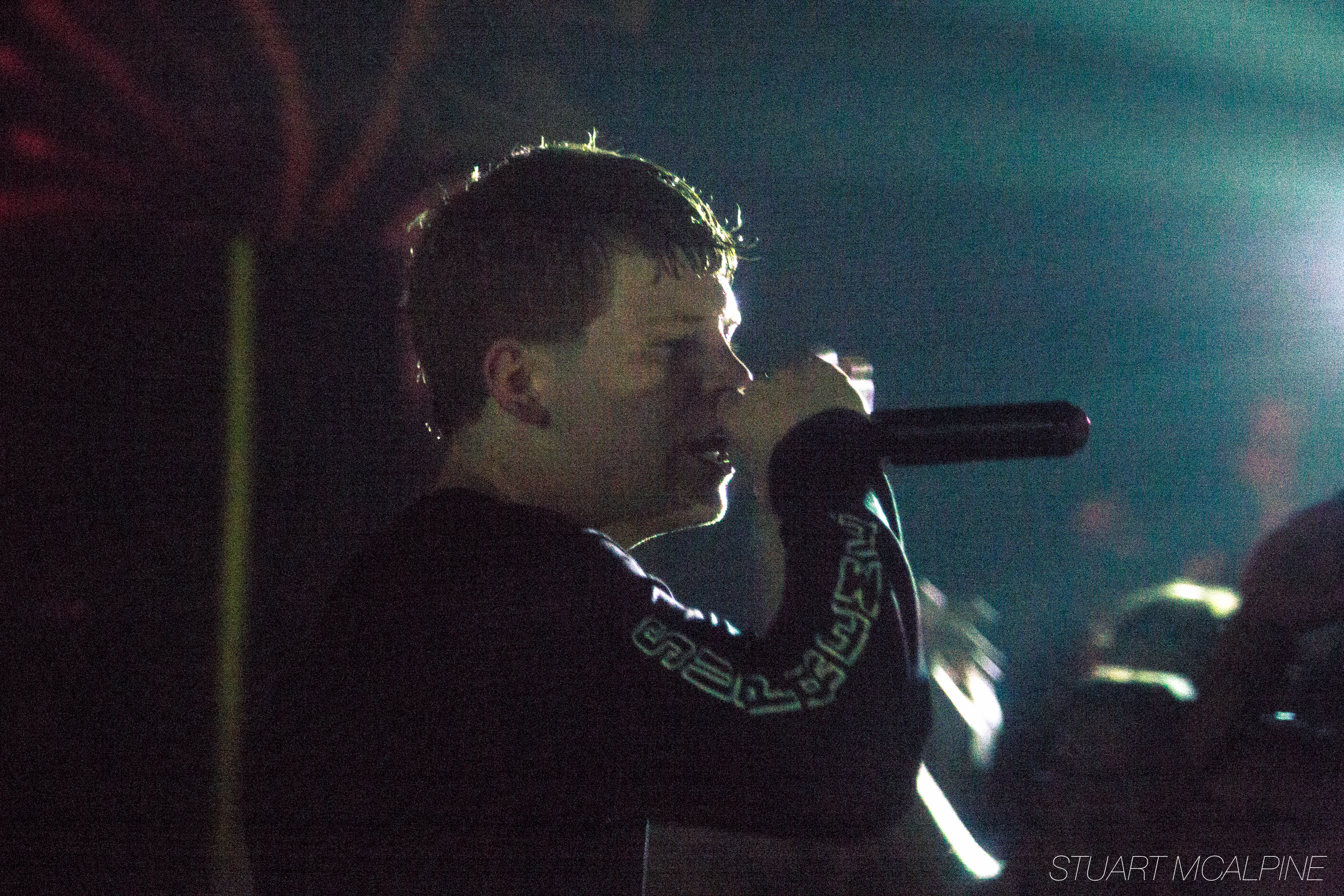
Yung Lean on the Black Marble Tour in Palisades in Brooklyn (July 2014)

In 2014, Yung Lean and Sad Boys embarked on the White Marble Tour, playing in 24 cities across Europe. Shortly after the conclusion of this tour Sad Boys announced a further Black Marble Tour, which would include several performances in cities across North America. The first of these shows took place in July at the Webster Hall in New York City, and was well received by writers for publications such as XXL, and The New York Times.

Yung Lean starred on Studio PSL in May 2014 and was also one of five final nominees for the 2014 P3 Gold Awards in the Hip Hop/Soul category.

Yung Lean released his debut full-length album, titled Unknown Memory on 23 September 2014. The album was accompanied with North American and European tours, beginning on 1 December in New York with a nearly sold-out show on Webster Hall's main ballroom stage.

Yung Lean released his second full-length album, Warlord, on 25 February 2016; he also released a line of clothing, "Sad Boys Entertainment". Håstad modelled for Calvin Klein's July 2016, AW16 Campaign. During his Warlord American tour, his tour bus in Pennsylvania was shot at. Håstad was also featured on Frank Ocean's critically acclaimed Blonde where he provided backup vocals on the songs "Godspeed" and "Self Control". According to Håstad, his part on the project was recorded when he was seventeen in Ocean's apartment in London.

Yung Lean released a surprise track on 25 November 2016 titled "Hennessy & Sailor Moon (feat. Bladee)". On 14 December 2016 he released the mixtape Frost God containing eight tracks including "Hennessy & Sailor Moon" and "Crystal City" which featured A$AP Ferg.

=== 2017–2019: Stranger, Poison Ivy and Nectar ===
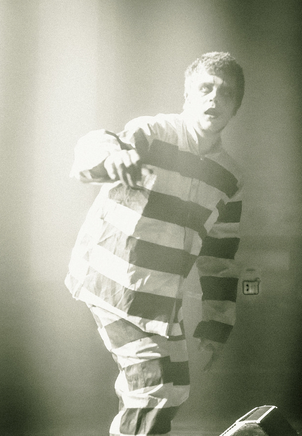
Yung Lean performing in 2018

Håstad released his third studio album Stranger on 10 November 2017, with the singles "Red Bottom Sky", "Hunting My Own Skin", and "Skimask", through Stockholm label YEAR0001.

In an interview with Complex in January 2018, Håstad announced he was writing several film scripts, including one based around Swedish serial killer John Ausonius, best known as "The Laser Man". In February 2018, Yung Lean released the single "King Cobra" with Thaiboy Digital, as well as a collaboration with Converse that consisted of a shoe and several items of clothing titled "One Star Toxic".

On 2 November 2018, Håstad released his third mixtape Poison Ivy with the single "Happy Feet" released on 24 October 2018. The album, a collaboration with Whitearmor, a member of Drain Gang with whom Håstad frequently collaborates, debuted at number 44 on the Sweden Albums Charts, the Sverigetopplistan.

On 25 January 2019, Yung Lean released his first full-length album under Jonatan Leandoer96, Nectar, with the singles "Wooden Girl", "Nectar" and "Tangerine Warrior". The album strays away from Leandoer's sad hip-hop roots and goes for a blend of indie rock and neofolk.

=== 2020–2024: Starz, Blodhundar & Lullabies, In My Head, Stardust, Sugar World and Psykos ===
On 26 February 2020, Yung Lean released the single "Boylife in EU", produced by frequent collaborator Whitearmor. On 27 March 2020, Yung Lean uploaded a 44-second teaser featuring a mix of songs from his upcoming fourth-studio album Starz. Owing to the global COVID-19 pandemic, the Starz tour, which was due to begin in late March, was cancelled, and on 2 April 2020 Yung Lean streamed a 45-minute concert from the back of a truck in an undisclosed location, the stream featuring a mix of songs from previous works, as well as newly released "Boylife in EU". On 14 April 2020 the second single from Starz was released, "Violence + Pikachu". Starz was released on 15 May 2020, the album being produced by Whitearmor and Yung Sherman and featuring Ariel Pink on the album's title track.

On 9 November 2020, Yung Lean announced the release of his second full-length Jonatan Leandoer96 album, "Blodhundar & Lullabies". The 16-track album eventually released a month later on 21 December.

On 27 November 2020, the documentary Yung Lean: In My Head premiered in cinemas. Directed by music documentarian Henrik Burman, the documentary charts Leandoer's early career up until the release of Stranger. This includes reflections on the events that occurred in Miami from Leandoer, fellow artist Bladee and additional persons including manager Oskar Ekman, former associate Steven Machat and journalists from a variety of outlets including The Fader and Pitchfork. The documentary was originally scheduled to premiere at the 2020 Tribeca Film Festival, but was delayed due to the COVID-19 pandemic. It released digitally and in a limited number of cinemas in the fall of the same year instead.

On 8 April 2022, Yung Lean released a 12-track mixtape titled "Stardust" containing features from FKA Twigs, Skrillex, Drain Gang and Ant Wan.

On 14 December 2022, the single "Blue Light" was released as Jonatan Leandoer96, accompanied by a music video directed by Olle Knutson and Philip Hovensjö. This announced his full-length album titled Sugar World, which was subsequently released on 3 February 2023.

Yung Lean was featured on the track "Parasail" from Travis Scott's Utopia, released on 28 July 2023. He released Psykos, a collaborative album with Bladee, on 13 March 2024. Yung Lean was featured alongside Swedish artist Robyn on a remix of Charli XCX's single "360", released on 31 May 2024.

On 4 November 2024, it was announced that Yung Lean would appear alongside Charli XCX in the upcoming film Sacrifice, marking his feature-film debut. Later that month, he stated that he had cut ties with YEAR0001, and that future music and products would be released through his own label World Affairs.

=== 2025–present: Jonatan ===
Yung Lean announced his fifth studio album, Jonatan, on 21 January 2025. The album was released on 2 May 2025.

Håstad performed in front of an audience of 10,330 people on 1 March 2025 in the Avicii Arena in Stockholm. The concert was well received by Swedish news outlets and described as a "collective triumph" by Aftonbladet. Long-time friend Yung Sherman opened the show, and during the evening Håstad was guested by Yung Gud, Ecco2k, Bladee and Thaiboy Digital.

In April 2026, Håstad collaborated with Gener8ion on "Storm" as well as performing in the music video, directed by Romain Gavras. The song and its music video received critical acclaim. After their performance at the 2026 MTV Video Music Awards, it became a top five hit on the Swedish singles chart and peaked at number 61 on the Billboard Global 200. The video earned him the first nomination at the Grammy Awards for Best Music Video.

On 17 September 2026, Håstad released a single in collaboration with Future and Metro Boomin titled "That's It". The track was one of six singles released for Grand Theft Auto VI: The Album, which was released on 20 November.

== Artistry ==
XXL included him in their 2014 list of "15 European Rappers You Should Know". Fact magazine viewed the Unknown Death 2002 mixtape as "a logical continuation of Clams Casino and Beautiful Lou's innovative techniques, emerging with thick, melancholy numbers that drip with a rare and earnest allure." In 2013, Fact published another article titled "Rise of the Sad Boys: from Kompakt to Yung Lean, a history of how electronic musicians have worn their sadness on their sleeves", which claimed that "[Yung Lean]'s mixtape Unknown Death 2002 is the epitome of sad rap".

Yung Lean was described by Entertainment Weekly as "loosely affiliated" with the cloud rap movement. According to music website HighClouds, part of Yung Lean's appeal is "the production provided by Yung Gud and Yung Sherman who combine the cloud rap of Clams Casino with electronic music touches".

Yung Lean is also the vocalist for the post-punk band Död Mark ("dead ground"), along with fellow Sad Boys member Gud. The duo's debut album, Drabbad av Sjukdom was released in 2016 through Stockholm label YEAR0001.

== Sad Boys ==
Håstad formed the collective Sad Boys along with Yung Sherman and Gud in 2012. The group was described by Dazed magazine as being prominent in the cloud rap scene. In 2016, Håstad accused Urban Outfitters of plagiarizing their designs. The group's iconography include a frowning face.

== Personal life ==
Outside of music, Håstad has expressed an interest in film writing and acting, stating in 2019 that he had written drafts for a screenplay about a "strange gangster drama" and a rock opera about John Ausonius, a Swedish serial killer.

Håstad has several hobbies, including reading, ceramics, painting, writing and playing piano. Håstad began painting following his release from a mental health hospital as a way to relax. In a 2019 interview, Håstad told Kaleidoscope magazine that he has bipolar disorder. He was diagnosed with it in 2017 and takes medication for his condition.

=== Hospitalization ===
While recording his second studio album Warlord, Håstad lived in Miami Beach, Florida, US. During this time, Håstad became addicted to Xanax, lean, and cocaine. On 7 April 2015, Håstad overdosed and was hospitalized in Mount Sinai Medical Center & Miami Heart Institute. Håstad's overdose and subsequent hospitalization coincided with the death of his manager and close personal friend, Barron Machat. After the incident, Håstad moved back to Sweden to live with his family. At the same time, Håstad's father was flying to visit Håstad in the hospital, where he stayed for four days. Håstad says he did not recognize him at first, but they returned to Sweden together. For about two months, Håstad's father tended to him while he recovered in the countryside, in relative isolation, before moving back into his parents' residence in Stockholm.

== Influence ==
Håstad has been credited for being a pioneer in the emo rap, cloud rap, and SoundCloud rap genres. In 2019, Yung Lean was awarded the Bram Stoker Medal of Cultural Achievement by the University Philosophical Society at Trinity College, Dublin.

== Awards and nominations ==
Award	Year	Nominee(s)	Category	Result	Ref.
Grammy Awards	2027	"Storm" (with Gener8ion	Best Music Video	Pending	
MTV Video Music Awards	2026	"Storm" (with Gener8ion)	Video of the Year	Nominated	
MTV Video Music Awards	2026	"Storm" (with Gener8ion)	Best Direction	Nominated	
MTV Video Music Awards	2026	"Storm" (with Gener8ion)	Best Choreography	Nominated	
MTV Video Music Awards	2026	"Storm" (with Gener8ion)	Best Long Form Video	Nominated	
UK Music Video Awards	2026	"Storm" (with Gener8ion)	Video of the Year	Won	
UK Music Video Awards	2026	"Storm" (with Gener8ion)	Best Dance/Electronic Video – International	Won	
UK Music Video Awards	2026	"Storm" (with Gener8ion)	Best Performance in a Video	Won	
UK Music Video Awards	2026	"Storm" (with Gener8ion)	Best Casting in a Video	Won	
UK Music Video Awards	2026	"Storm" (with Gener8ion)	Best Choreography in a Video	Won	
UK Music Video Awards	2026	"Storm" (with Gener8ion)	Best Cinematography in a Video	Nominated	
UK Music Video Awards	2026	"Storm" (with Gener8ion)	Best Editing in a Video	Nominated	

== Discography ==
Studio albums

- Unknown Memory (2014)
- Warlord (2016)
- Stranger (2017)
- Starz (2020)
- Psykos (2024) (with Bladee)
- Jonatan (2025)

== Filmography ==
=== Film ===
Table featuring feature films with Yung Lean
Year	Title	Role	Notes	Ref(s)
2017	Stranger	Wanted Man	Companion short film for Stranger	
2020	Yung Lean: In My Head	Himself	Documentary	
2023	Circus Maximus	Himself		
2025	Sacrifice	Arthur		
2026	Storm		Short film	

== See also ==
- Swedish hip-hop
