= Cold Visions =

2024 studio album by Bladee

Studio album by Bladee
- Released: 23 April 2024
- Studio: Bladee's house (Stockholm)
- Genre: Rage
- Length: 63:36
- Label: Trash Island
- Producers: 100yrd; Jonah Abraham; AM; F1lthy; James Ferraro; Glasear; Simon Hessman; Lucian; Lusi; Lukrative; Mechatok; Mochila; Rok; Gabriel Schuman; Skrillex; Warpstr; Woesum; Whitearmor; Yung Sherman

Bladee chronology
Psykos (2024)	Cold Visions (2024)	Ste the Beautiful Martyr 1st Attempt (2025)

Cold Visions is the seventh solo studio album by the Swedish rapper Bladee. A surprise album, it was self-released under his Trash Island label on 23 April 2024. As his 30th birthday approached, Bladee experienced a depressive episode, feeling anxious about ageing and the mixed reception to his previous solo album, Spiderr (2022). He recorded Cold Visions at his house in Stockholm across a two-week period. Due to monetary disputes, the album was not released on longtime label Year0001. The album was executive produced by Bladee and Gabriel Schuman; it was primarily produced by F1lthy, with contributions from Skrillex, Whitearmor, and James Ferraro, among others.

Cold Visions is Bladee's longest release; it is a hip-hop album characterized by audio logos, references to his past work, and a recurring theme of paranoia. It received critical acclaim; critics considered it one of his darkest works. The album was promoted by a tour across North America and Europe. Several publications featured it on their year-end lists.

== Background and recording ==
Bladee released his sixth solo studio album, Spiderr, on 30 September 2022, to mixed reception. In March 2024, he released the collaborative studio album Psykos with longtime collaborator Yung Lean, to positive reviews. Although he has used guitars in his music before, this was the first time he committed to a post-punk and alternative rock sound.

As his 30th birthday approached, Bladee experienced a depressive episode, feeling anxious about ageing and the mixed reception to Spiderr. Kieran Press-Reynolds from Pitchfork wrote that Bladee was experiencing "something like a mid-career crisis". Cold Visions was recorded at Bladee's house in Stockholm across a two-week period. The album was primarily produced by F1lthy, with contributions from Skrillex, Whitearmor, James Ferraro, among others.

== Composition ==
Publications have classified Cold Visions as a rap album. With its 30 tracks and a runtime of nearly 64 minutes, it is Bladee's longest release. Paranoia is a recurring theme in the album and the songs seamlessly transition into each other. Critics felt that Cold Visions contained darker themes and production when compared to Bladee's previous work. Press-Reynolds felt it was darker compared to the "sublime optimism" of Crest (2022) and 333 (2020) and the "summery bounce" of Good Luck (2020) and The Fool (2021). Charles Lyons-Burt from Slant Magazine said that Bladee's work "has never sounded so paranoid, dark, and dangerous"; HotNewHipHop's Zachary Horvath called it "extremely dark". AllMusic's Fred Thomas wrote that the majority of the album is "aggressive and nihilistic", and "dense, paranoid, and nightmarish". Writing for Paste, Madelyn Dawson called F1lthy's production "dark" and "distorted". Quinn Moreland of The Guardian wrote that, across the album, "he purges his demons over raging, blown-out trap beats"; Bladee described the lyricism in the album as "really honest, more like a diary". Tom Breihan of Stereogum wrote: "Bladee delivers most of his heavily-accented lyrics in a blurry, downcast, syncopated hum, while the blown-out beats conjure icy-tundra landscapes".

Cold Visions contains references to Bladee's older work. Press-Reynolds wrote that "nearly every song makes some kind of allusion to a previous release". Throughout the album, he mentions his songs "Everlasting Flames" (2014) and "Redlight Moments" (2017). On "Don't Wanna Hang Out", he reveals more of the "previously established lore about the mystical Drain Gang High School", as described by Press-Reynolds. Audio logos from his previous work are also included on the album, such as a tag from the 1998 film Blade and a sound effect from the 2008 video game Street Fighter IV. Fans created a document to name every reference and interpolation on the album; Sam Goldner of Pitchfork called the samples and producer tags "overstimulating".

== Songs ==
=== Tracks 1–8 ===
The opening track of Cold Visions is "Paranoia Intro", a track that "sets the tone for the cloudy set of tracks to follow" according to Krueger. During the opening line, Bladee is cut off by Vincent Price's laugh in "Thriller" (1983) by Michael Jackson. Bladee raps about being embarrassed about his age over airy synthesizers. "Wodrainer" explores themes of substance abuse, depression, paranoia, being loyal towards Drain Gang, and not wanting to become mainstream. The track "Yung Sherman" is a collaboration with the producer of the same name; during one line, he compares losing his phone to heartbreak and creates "fairly intriguing internet poetry", according to Stereogum's Danielle Chelosky. "Flatline" is written about letting somebody down, and Bladee's emotional vocals shift between quiet whispers and soft cries. The track contains delicate emotions, wispy adlibs, and a synth melody. According to Crissy Saucier of The Massachusetts Daily Collegian, the track sees Bladee "reflect[ing] on patterns in his relationships, acknowledging a tendency toward self-destructive behavior". Consequence's Jonah Krueger described the production on the track as "icy" and "in-your-face", alongside the following "One Second" featuring Yung Lean. "Sad Meal" contains a harsh delivery and makes references to his debut mixtape Gluee (2014) and the scrapped project Rainworld; the track is also written about being at McDonald's. "Fun Fact" also features Yung Lean, and Paper's Shaad D'Souza called it "menacing and brusque". "Only God Is Made Perfect" begins with Bladee announcing "drain gang" with a beat drop cutting off Bladee's line: "I used to sell—"; the line is replaced by "the album title cut[ting] in a cunning redaction".

=== Tracks 9–20 ===
On "Don't Wanna Hang Out", Bladee expresses that he wants to spend time alone, sharing his irritations with "fake friends and clout chasers" over a beat produced by F1lthy. Writing about the beat, Raphael Helfand of The Fader said that it "crescendos as triumphantly as a Lex Luger beat". "I Don't Like People (Whitearmor Interlude)" contains an appearance from fellow Drain Gang member Whitearmor; the track presents Bladee chanting the song's title atop a synth progression. Another track that features Yung Lean, the lyrics in "I Don't Like People" hint toward Bladee's departure from his longtime record label Year0001. The track begins with eerie synthesizers and deep bass, presenting Bladee's dark delivery using Auto-Tuned vocals. Yung Lean explores the feeling of "being overwhelmed by constant attention". "End of the Road Boyz" begins with a sample of deafening screams taken from a viral Roblox video. The track sees Bladee changing moods, alternating between cheerful warbles and sad murmurs. On "D.O.A.", Bladee repeats the song's title and Skrillex creates a bounding instrumental with trembling synthesizers. "Don't Do Drugz" carries a message against substance abuse, with Bladee urging people close to him to avoid drugs. "Lows Partlyy" contains "blooming synths", depressing lyrics, and is "eerily joyous" according to Press-Reynolds. "So Cold Interlude" sheds light on the emotionally vulnerable side of Bladee. The following "Message to Myself" is a moment of "restored confidence" after the previous track. "Terrible Excellence", a track about being obsessed with loneliness, contains another Yung Lean feature and contains an aggressive and bass-heavy beat. The title of "Red Cross" is a reference to Bladee's 2022 album with Ecco2k, Crest; the track is characterized by paranoia due to Bladee's vocal delivery. Thaiboy Digital and Yung Lean feature on "Lucky Luke".

=== Tracks 21–30 ===
Joel Rodriguez from the KLSU radio station described "River Flows in You" as "by the books" rage music. On "King Nothingg", Bladee makes light of trauma dumping and murder. The track contains convulsing bass thuds and shivering synths. Rodriguez felt that "Bad 4 Business" has "lowkey" production and "sparse" lyrics. "Otherside" contains a feature from Sickboyrari, also known as Black Kray. Bladee's flow begins steady but slowly fades by the end of the track; Helfand described F1lthy's instrumental on the track as "fried". Sickboyrari appears late in the song, with a "codeine-coated delivery", which Helfand said "allows us to imagine what Chief Keef might sound like if he was born in the south". "Normal" shows more of Bladee's angry and emotional side. His vocals on "Flexing & Finessing" twitch with unusual vocal effects and shifts. Press-Reynolds said that Bladee randomly saying "I'm back!" on the track sounded "as if he's returning home from work in the twilight haze". The track "PM2" sees Bladee rapping the line "Fucking giving these lames percentage", which some fans interpreted as a critique of Year0001. On "False", Bladee questions his existence and fading sense of direction in a club. The penultimate track "Can't End on a Loss (Outro)", one of the two outro tracks, sees Bladee reflecting on his childhood and his career. The final track is "Cold Visions (Outro 2)", contains a piano instrumental mixed with synthesizers. Rodriguez described it as "a more emotionally touching closing track".

== Promotion and release ==
On 23 April 2024, Bladee released a music video for Cold Visions's opening track "Paranoia Intro", which led to fans wondering if an album was coming. Later that day, Cold Visions was self-released as a surprise album under his label Trash Island. It is Bladee's first studio album not released by his longtime record label and management company Year0001. He stopped working with the label because he no longer sought to be a bigger artist and wanted to focus on staying true to himself. "One Second" received a music video created by Harmony Korine's creative company EDGLRD on 1 May 2024. Throughout August and October 2024, Bladee undertook on a North American tour to promote Cold Visions. He performed songs from the album live for the first time at the Osheaga Festival during August 2024, after shows in Chicago and Houston were postponed due to issues with his visa. The tour concluded on October 18, in Philadelphia. He embarked on the European leg of the tour in December 2024.

== Critical reception ==
Professional ratings
Review scores
Source	Rating
AllMusic	4/5 stars
Pitchfork	8.3/10
Sputnikmusic	2.9/5

Cold Visions received critical acclaim. It was awarded the "Best New Music" accolade from Pitchfork. Press-Reynolds wrote that it is "his most realized project to date" and said "Bladee's version of rap is blemished but beautiful, imperfect and half-coherent in a way that makes banal thoughts feel endearingly askew". For AllMusic, Thomas said that although "Cold Visions creates an atmosphere that's intense and sometimes challenging to engage with […] Bladee's way with his horrific words and worldview is nothing short of fascinating". Sputnikmusic wrote: "Of the aesthetics and sounds explored using production here, few seem fit for human consumption".

Cold Visions was placed in both mid-year and year-end lists of the best albums of the year. The staff from The Fader deemed it the fourth best album of the year. Colin Joyce wrote that it blends abstract elements with reflections on violence and the weight of existence in a dark world. Pitchfork considered it the eighth best album of the year; Goldner called the album a "30-track meltdown" and felt it contained "some of [Bladee's] most inventive flows yet". It was included in both Slant Magazine's mid-year and year-end list of the best albums of 2024. Lyons-Burt wrote that Bladee "deepens his sound" with the album. He further wrote that the line "it's 9 p.m. in the morning" on "Red Cross" captures the eerie and reversed atmosphere of Cold Visions. Paste placed it at 97 in their list of the best albums of the year; Dawson called it a "love letter" to Drain Gang, and wrote that "Bladee cements himself as a genuine artist". It also appeared in an unranked year-end list from AllMusic.

=== Year-end lists ===
Publication	List	Rank	Ref.
AllMusic	100 Best Albums of 2024	—N/a	
The Fader	50 Best Albums of 2024	4	
Paste	100 Best Albums of 2024	97	
Pitchfork	50 Best Albums of 2024	8	
Slant Magazine	50 Best Albums of 2024	33	

== Track listing ==
Cold Visions track listing
No.	Title	Writer(s)	Producer(s)	Length
1.	"Paranoia Intro"	Benjamin Reichwald; Richard Ortiz	F1lthy; 100yrd	1:10
2.	"Wodrainer"	Reichwald; Ortiz	F1lthy; Jonah Abraham; James Ferraro	2:33
3.	"Yung Sherman" (featuring Yung Sherman)	Reichwald; Ortiz; Axel Tufvesson	F1lthy; Glasear; Yung Sherman	2:12
4.	"Flatline"	Reichwald; Arthur Nyqvist; Tufvesson	Woesum; Yung Sherman; Ferraro	2:54
5.	"One Second" (featuring Yung Lean)	Reichwald; Jonatan Leandoer; Ortiz	F1lthy; Rok	1:51
6.	"Sad Meal"	Reichwald; Ortiz	F1lthy; 100yrd	2:01
7.	"Fun Fact" (featuring Yung Lean)	Reichwald; Leandoer; Ortiz	F1lthy; Glasear; Ferraro	1:48
8.	"Only God Is Made Perfect"	Reichwald; Ortiz	F1lthy; AM; Warpstr	1:48
9.	"Don't Wanna Hang Out"	Reichwald; Ortiz	F1lthy; AM	1:39
10.	"I Don't Like People (Whitearmor Interlude)" (featuring Whitearmor)	Reichwald; Ludwig Rosenberg	Whitearmor	0:38
11.	"I Don't Like People" (featuring Yung Lean)	Reichwald; Ortiz; Timur Tokdemir; Leandoer	F1lthy; Rok; Mechatok	2:40
12.	"End of the Road Boyz"	Reichwald; Ortiz; Gabriel Schuman	F1lthy; 100yrd; Schuman; Ferraro	2:15
13.	"D.O.A" (with Skrillex)	Reichwald; Luis Cano; Skrillex	Lusi; Skrillex	2:20
14.	"Don't Do Drugz"	Reichwald; Cano	Lusi	1:33
15.	"Lows Partlyy"	Reichwald; Cano	Lusi	2:16
16.	"So Cold Interlude"	Reichwald; Tufvesson; Nyqvist	Yung Sherman; Woesum	1:36
17.	"Message to Myself"	Reichwald; Tufvesson; Nyqvist	Yung Sherman; Woesum; Ferraro	1:15
18.	"Terrible Excellence" (featuring Yung Lean)	Reichwald; Leandoer; Ortiz; Schuman	F1lthy; 100yrd; Schuman; Whitearmor	2:33
19.	"Red Cross"	Reichwald; Tokdemir; Ortiz; Schuman	F1lthy; 100yrd; Mechatok; Schuman	2:17
20.	"Lucky Luke" (featuring Thaiboy Digital and Yung Lean)	Reichwald; Nyqvist; Tufvesson; Thanapat Bunleang; Leandoer	Woesum; Yung Sherman; Schuman; Ferraro	2:07
21.	"River Flows in You"	Reichwald; Ortiz	F1lthy; Lucian; Mochila; Ferraro	1:44
22.	"King Nothingg"	Reichwald; Ortiz	F1lthy; Rok; Warpstr; Ferraro	2:26
23.	"Bad 4 Business"	Reichwald; Cano; Simon Hessman	Lusi; Hessman	1:42
24.	"Otherside" (featuring Black Kray)	Reichwald; Teezy F BabyIsrael; Ortiz	F1lthy; Lukrative	2:35
25.	"Normal"	Reichwald; Cano	Lusi	1:18
26.	"Flexing and Finessing"	Reichwald; Ortiz; Schuman	F1lthy; Lukrative; Schuman	3:04
27.	"PM2"	Reichwald; Tufvesson; Nyqvist	Yung Sherman; Woesum	2:08
28.	"False"	Reichwald; Cano	Lusi	2:07
29.	"Can't End on a Loss (Outro)"	Reichwald; Ortiz	F1lthy; Abraham	3:33
30.	"Cold Visions (Outro 2)" (featuring Ecco2k)	Reichwald; Rosenberg; Tufvesson	Whitearmor; Yung Sherman	3:33
Total length:				63:36

Notes

- Track titles are stylised in all caps.
- Tracks 9–11, 14, and 29 are stylised without apostrophes.

== Personnel ==
- Gabriel Schuman – executive production, additional production, mixing, mastering, transitions
- Bladee – executive production, cover artwork
- James Ferraro – additional sound effects
- Malibu – additional sound effects
- Inef Coupe – additional sound effects
- Ville Nordström – cover artwork
- Ecco2k – cover imaging and post-production
