= Drain Gang =

Swedish hip hop collective

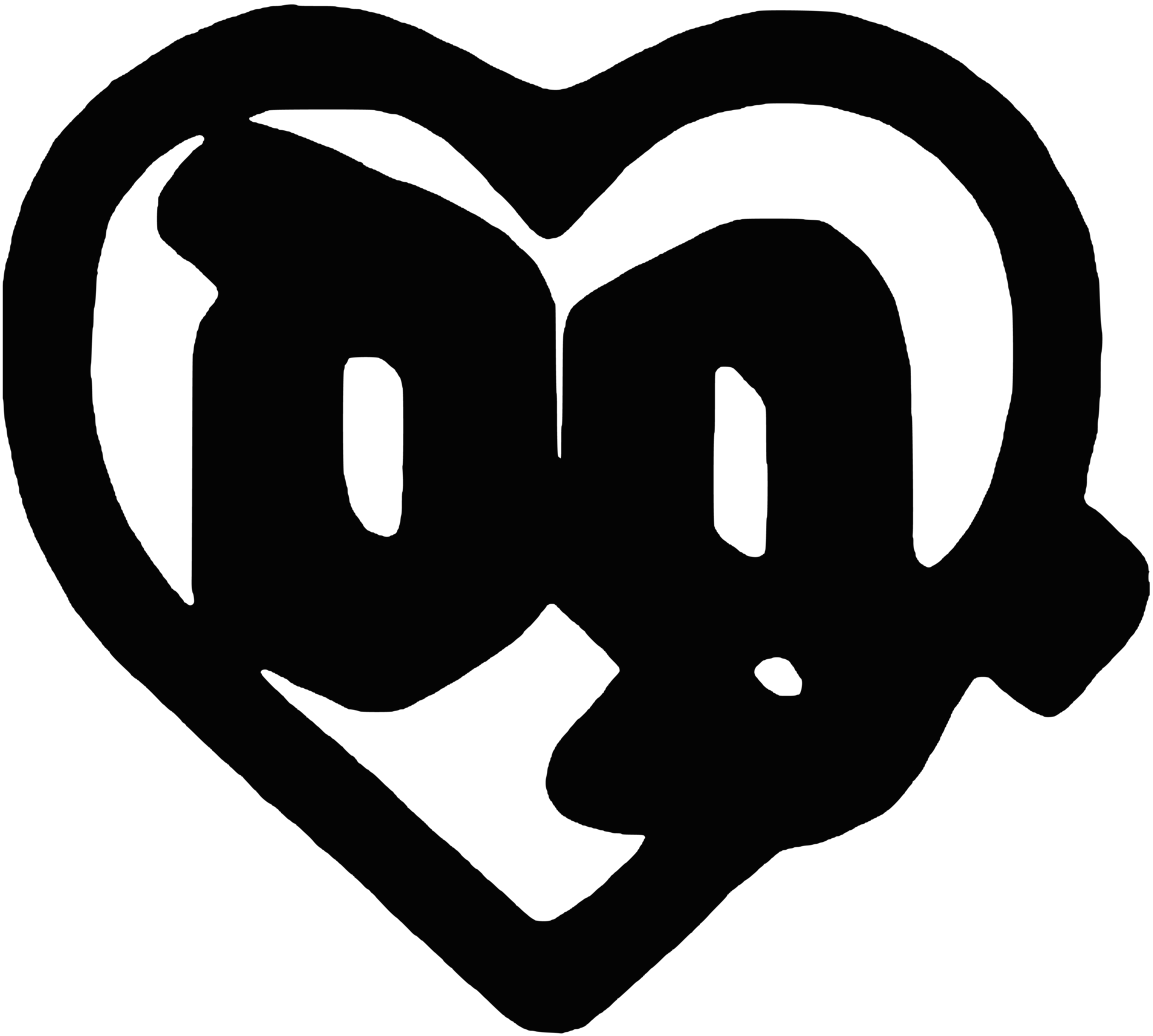
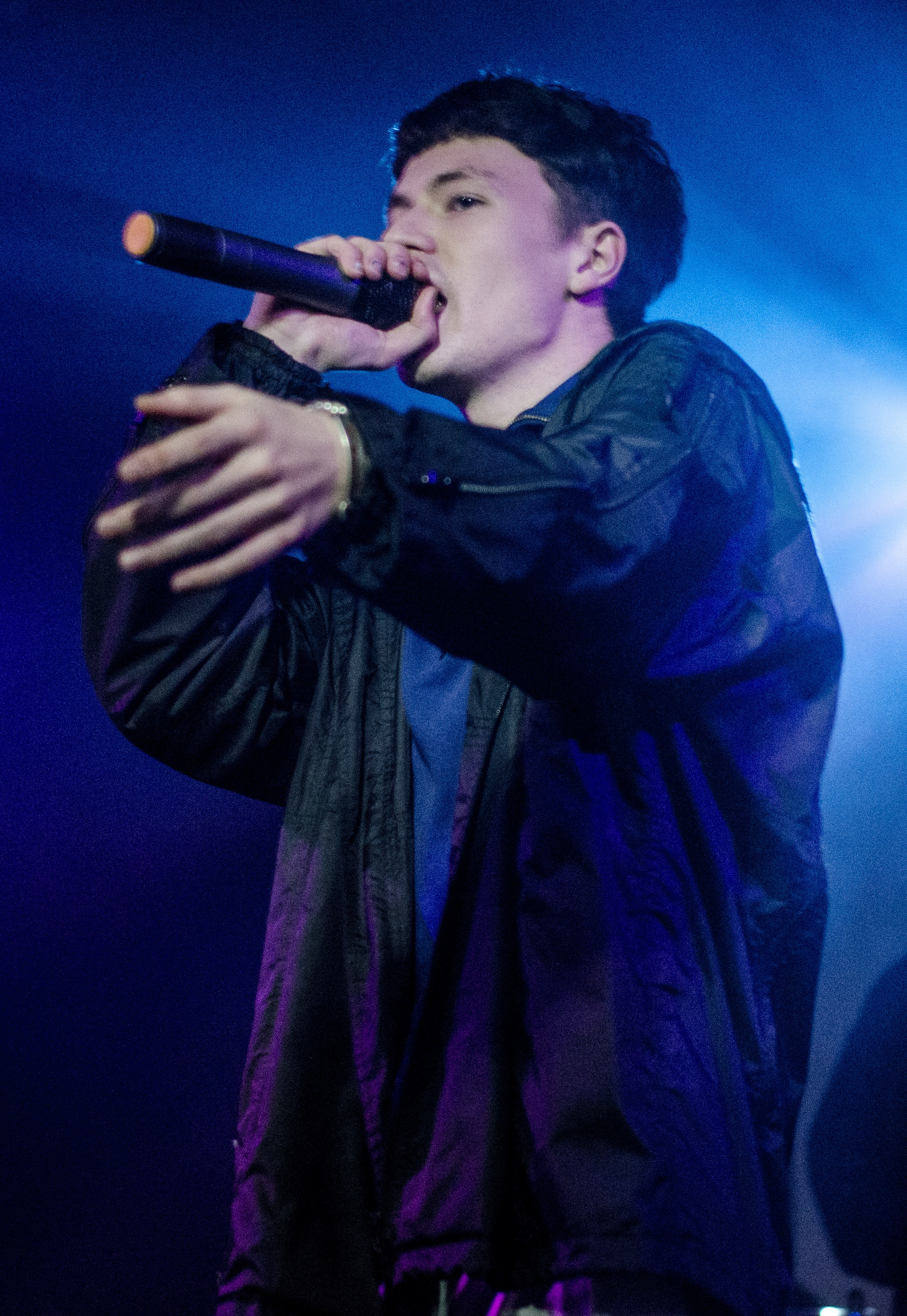
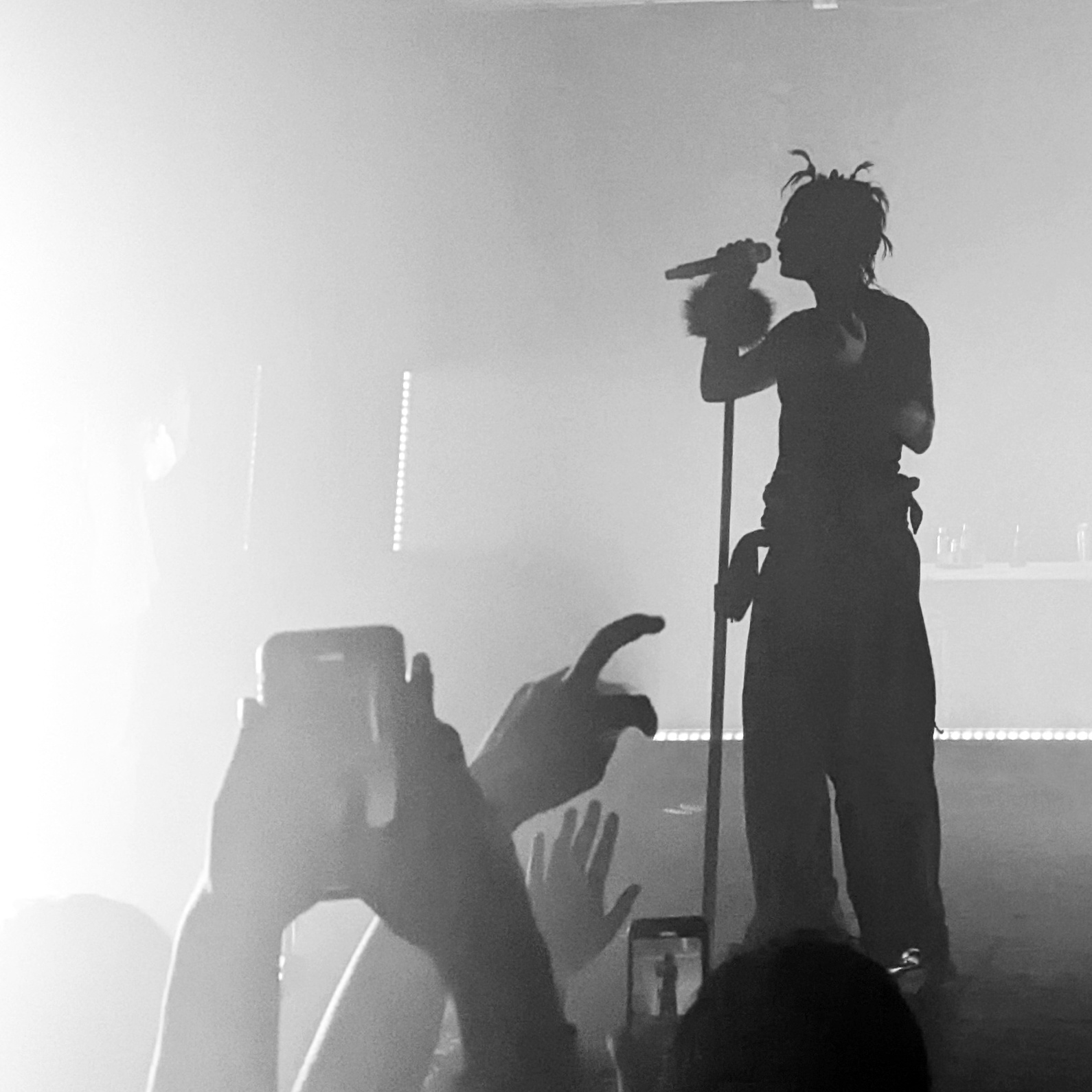
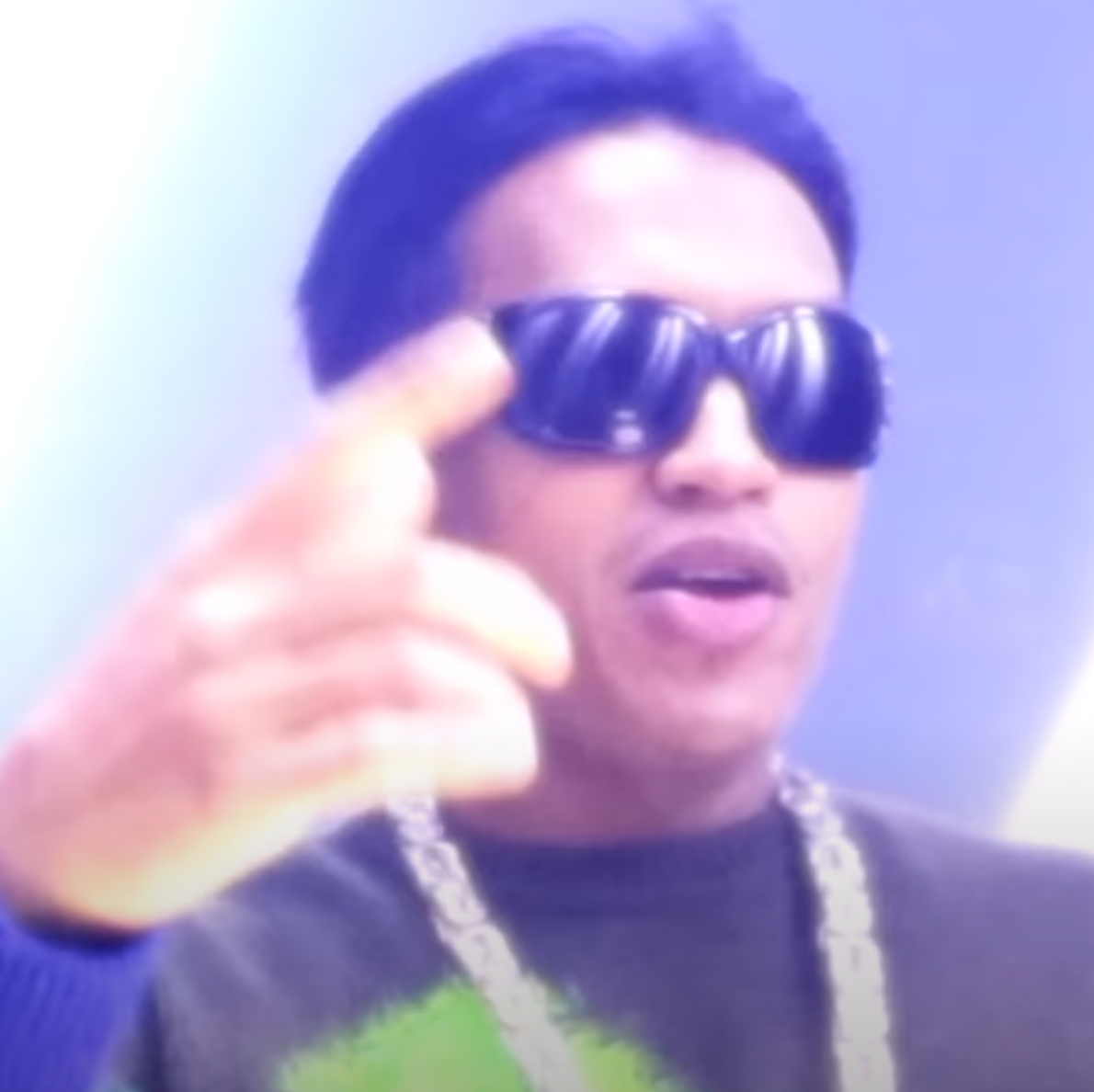
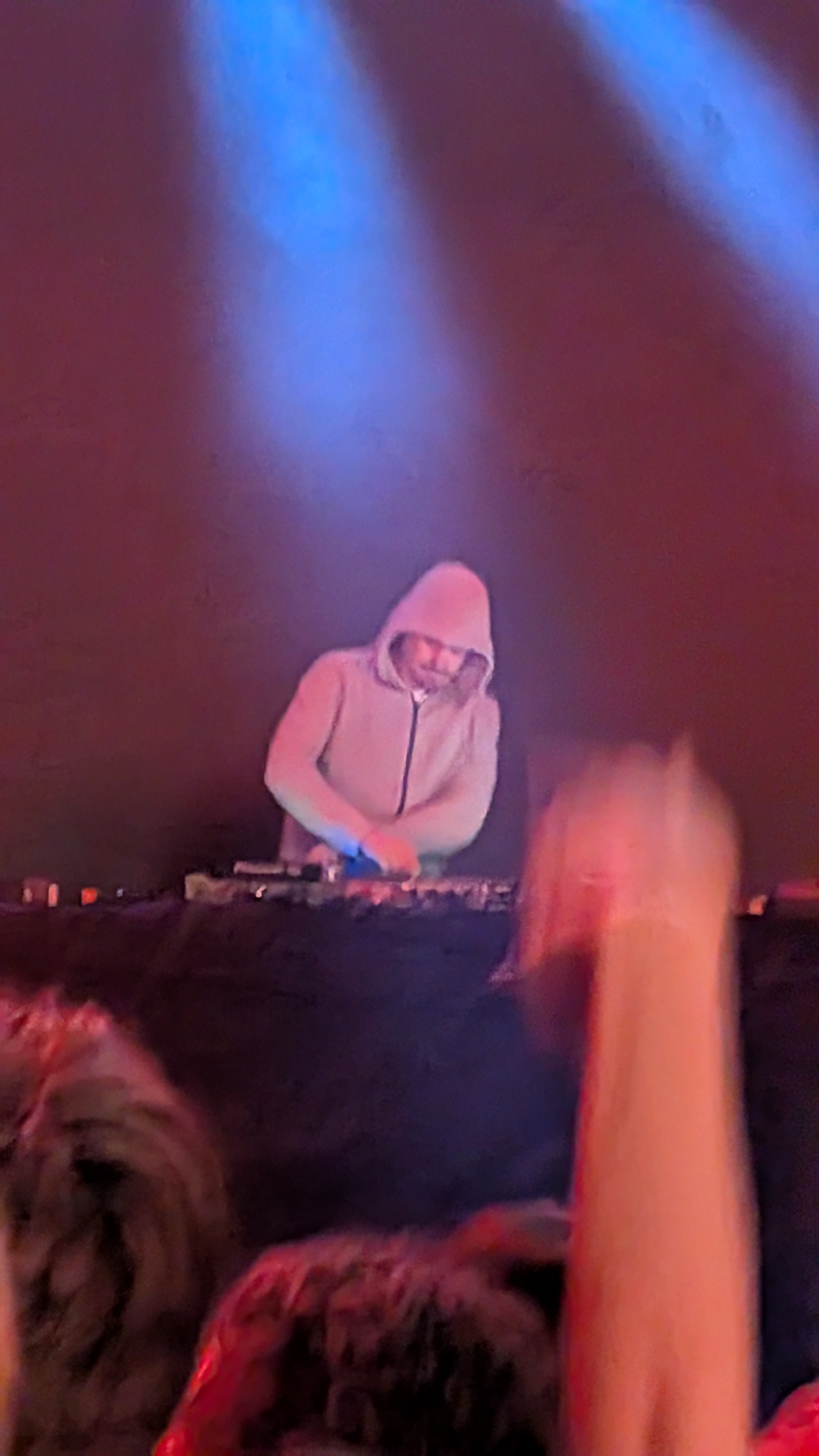
- One of the logos associated with Drain Gang: From top to bottom, left to right: Bladee (2016); Ecco2k (2022); Thaiboy Digital (2022); Whitearmor (2026)

Background information
- Also known as: Gravity Boys, Shield Gang, GTB, GTBSG, DG, D-9, SG
- Origin: Stockholm, Sweden
- Genres: Underground rap; cloud rap; avant-garde
- Years active: 2013–present
- Labels: Year0001 (all, formerly); Trash Island (Bladee); 9th. (Ninth) (Ecco2k); Bank of Star Sound System (Thaiboy Digital)
- Members: Bladee; Thaiboy Digital; Ecco2k; Whitearmor
- Past members: Yung Sherman
- Website: https://trashisland.gtb.sg/

Drain Gang (previously known as Gravity Boys Shield Gang and GTBSG) is a Swedish hip-hop collective formed in 2013, consisting of the rappers Bladee, Ecco2k, Thaiboy Digital, and producer Whitearmor. The group rose to be one of the top Swedish music collectives in the mid-late 2010s, gaining prominence for their influence in shaping the underground rap scene and cloud rap genre as well as collaborative projects with fellow Swedish artists Yung Lean and producers Gud and Yung Sherman.

== History ==
=== 2004–2012: Background ===
Future members Bladee and Ecco2k met as classmates in Stockholm, Sweden in 2004 and became childhood friends when they were around 10 years old. The duo performed as the grindcore duo Krossad in 2008 when they were both thirteen.

Producer Whitearmor had been releasing music online under several artist names, notably DJ Creep and DJ Cannabiz on SoundCloud.

Thaiboy Digital, whose family moved from Thailand to Stockholm in 2003, met producer Vattenrum through a shared pop and rock music class they took in the early 2000s. Prior to being friends, Thaiboy occasionally saw Ecco2k riding the same bus and even once at his school as they lived in the same neighborhood.

Around 2011, Bladee and Ecco2k met Whitearmor through mutual friends and Vattenrum introduced Thaiboy Digital to the rest of the group. In a 2026 interview with Pitchfork, Thaiboy revealed specific details on meeting Bladee and Ecco2k when they were 13 years old dancing together at an open air party.

=== 2013–2015: Early releases, GTBSG Compilation, Gluee, Tiger ===
==== 2013 ====
The five members began releasing music and freestyles as part of a larger music collective called Smög Boys. However in 2013, members Thaiboy Digital and Whitearmor came up with the idea of creating a music collective of their own. The group first assumed the name Gravity Boys before changing to Gravity Boys Shield Gang (GTBSG), Shield Gang, and later Drain Gang with the members frequently using and referencing these names interchangeably.

On the meaning of the group's Drain Gang name, Bladee stated in a 2018 interview with i-D magazine:

"Drain is about loss and gain; it could be good or bad — you could be drained of energy or you could drain something to gain energy. There’s financial, emotional and physical drains, for example — you could just be draining your bank account at the store. It doesn’t have to be deep. Basically, if I’m talking about ‘eating the night’ that means I drain it for its essence. Everything me and my bros do is connected to that concept — we might drain some blood for good fortune".

The collective's first work GTBSG Compilation was released on 12 August 2013. The compilation mixtape contained 12 singles released throughout the year by the members. The project contained primary production credits from Whitearmor as well as Curtis Heron, DJ Smokey, Josh Diamond, and Yung Sherman. It was released for free online via Bladee's Twitter account as well as the official SoundCloud account. 6 music videos were released within the same period of the compilations release for tracks including "bankaccount" by Thaiboy Digital and "Bleach" by Bladee and Ecco2k. The music videos for the tracks "I Will Make You Bleed," "HOLDMEDOWNLIKEGRAVITY,"and "Carwash" were created by Ecco2k while Bladee created the video for the track "My Magic is Strong".

The track "bladeecity" ft. Yung Lean was first released on 1 July 2013 on SoundCloud, before featuring on the GTBSG Compilation mixtape. it is notable for being the earliest officially released collaboration between Bladee and Yung Lean. In the same month, Bladee was featured on Yung Lean's single "Plastic Boy" produced by Vattenrum with Ecco2k credited for producing the accompanying music video released later that year.

==== 2014–2015 ====
Bladee's first mixtape Gluee was released on 27 January 2014, featuring Thaiboy Digital, Ecco2k, and BONES, and produced by Whitearmor, Yung Sherman, Curtis Heron, and Blank Body. The mixtape was uploaded for free via SoundCloud with a MediaFire download link In the lead up to the release of Gluee, Bladee produced and uploaded a promotional video titled "bladee commercial Pt.1.0 (gravity boys) #shieldgang" on Youtube teasing the upcoming mixtape on his official Twitter account in August and November 2013. The ep's only single "Everlasting Flames" was released first on Soundcloud with a music video filmed by Emrik Meshesha (DJ Ferrari), an early collaborator of Yung Lean who directed the music video for his song Ginseng Strip 2002. The music video for "Spellbound" was filmed by Swedish visual artist Ilja Karilampi, featuring Bladee, Ecco2k, Thaiboy Digital, and Yung Lean at Karilampi's solo exhibition 'JAG ÄR' which was displayed at Belenius Gallery in Stockholm from May to June 2014.

Thaiboy Digital's first mixtape, Tiger (also known as ส), was released in on 17 November 2014. The mixtape was released in the midst of a 2 year long struggle with the Swedish immigration that began in 2013 when the artist turned 18. In 2015, despite Thaiboy's appeals and Yung Lean posting a Change.org petition, he was deported from Sweden due to visa issues. Immediately after his deportation, Thaiboy and then-manager Emilio Fagone immediately began the process to apply for a Swedish work visa. Through the internet, he managed to continue collaborating with the other members from his new home in Bangkok, Thailand. The music video for the track "Diamonds" featuring Yung Lean was uploaded on Yung Lean's official YouTube channel on 1 March 2015 directed by Swedish video director Marcus Söderlund featuring Thaiboy and Yung Lean in the north of Sweden.

=== 2016–2018: Signing with Year0001 ===
==== 2016 ====
In 2016, all Drain Gang members signed contracts with Stockholm-based record label Year0001, co-founded in 2015 by Oskar Ekman and Emilio Fagone (Yung Lean's manager from 2013 until 2024).

Bladee's debut official studio album Eversince was released on 25 May 2016. Eversince was produced entirely by Whitearmor with additional production credits from members of Australian-based collective Ripsquad and Hitkidd. The group held the Eversince Tour from November to December 2016, and was Drain Gang's first tour as headliners with Bladee, Ecco2k, and Whitearmor performing on all eight dates. Originally, the Eversince tour was intended to have more dates and feature Thaiboy Digital, but was unable to perform due to EU visa issues. On 9 December, Thaiboy Digital and Bladee released the collaborative EP titled AvP which featured production credits from Whitearmor and Yung Sherman. The music video for the single "Still in Search of Sunshine" was released on 3 December, six days before the EP release, and was shot by Ecco2k.

==== 2017 ====
On 29 June 2017, Thaiboy Digital released a 4-track EP titled S.O.S: Suicide or Sacrifice, the EP was released 2 years after Thaiboy's deportation from Sweden, and he had recorded most of the EP when visiting Sweden in 2016. Woesum produced the first two tracks "Top Town" and "Nothing 2 Fear" while Gud produced "Magic" with the last track "Ruby" being produced by Groundislava in Los Angeles during Yung Lean's Warlord Tour.

On 7 August, Bladee, Ecco2k and Thaiboy Digital released their collaborative album D&G, featuring production from member Whitearmor, and frequent collaborators Gud, Yung Sherman, Woesum, and Ripsquad. The collaborative tape was further promoted during the D&G Fiend Tour, the group's second attempt at a large scale Drain Gang tour with all members in present.

On 28 December, Bladee also released the mixtape Working on Dying, a collaborative album with the Philadelphia producer collective Working on Dying. The entire project was produced by Working On Dying, with Whitearmor contributing additional production. The project contained features from Yung Lean, Black Kray (a frequent collaborator of both Bladee and Working On Dying), and Ecco2k, while Thaiboy Digital provided additional vocals on a few tracks. The project was heavily influenced by tread music, a trap subgenre created by Working on Dying.

==== 2018 ====
On 11 May 2018, Bladee released his second studio album Red Light. The release was celebrated with a special concert at the O2 Academy Islington in London on 16 May 2018.

On 29 December, Bladee released Icedancer, his third mixtape and ninth project. The mixtape was produced by RipSquad and features collaborations with Yung Lean, Cartier'GOD, and Thaiboy Digital.

=== 2019–2023: Increasing popularity ===
==== 2019 ====
On 12 September 2019, the group released a collaborative album titled Trash Island. Whitearmor served as the executive producer, while Ripsquad and German producer Mechatok returned to contribute additional production. The album was partially recorded and produced in Bangkok, Thailand. The album was a surprise release, as no announcement was made on Year0001's nor the group's various social medias.

A few weeks later, on 26 September, Thaiboy Digital released his debut studio album, Legendary Member. A further two months later, on 27 November 2019, Ecco2k released E, his debut studio album, produced by both Gud and Whitearmor.

==== 2020 ====
In 2020, Bladee released three full-length studio albums, the first of which being Exeter. Released on 8 April, it was produced by frequent collaborator Gud. The project contains elements of genres like cloud rap, art pop, trap, and alternative R&B. Bladee's second album of 2020 was 333. Released on 16 July, it was produced by Whitearmor. Gud, Mechatok, Ripsquad member Lusi, and Swedish musician Joakim Benon all contributed additional production to the album. Bladee's third and final album of 2020 was Good Luck. A collaborative album with Mechatok, it was released on 10 December. The album was unveiled in a livestream performance.

==== 2021 ====
On 31 March, Ecco2k released a 5-track EP titled PXE. Months later, Bladee's fifth studio album The Fool released on 28 May. All songs on the project are produced by Lusi along with other producers such as Loesoe, who appears several times on the album. The album's artwork and track listing were leaked, with an originally planned release date of 11 June. At the end of the year, the group announced a 2022 Drain Gang world tour, consisting of 23 performances across Europe and North America.

==== 2022 ====
On 19 January 2022, Bladee and Ecco2k released a collaborative single titled "Amygdala" produced by Mechatok. A collaborative album by Bladee & Ecco2k, entitled Crest, was released unannounced on 18 March of the same year. The album, containing the single "Girls just want to have fun", which had previously been released as a miscellaneous single in 2020, was produced entirely by Whitearmor. On 20 May, Whitearmor released his solo debut, a full-length instrumental album titled In The Abyss: Music for Weddings. On 30 September, Bladee released his sixth studio album, Spiderr. On 18 November, Thaiboy Digital released his second studio album, Back 2 Life.

=== 2024–present: Post-Year0001 ===
==== 2024 ====
On 13 March, Bladee and Yung Lean released a collaborative album titled Psykos on Yung Lean's World Affairs label. The following month, on 24 April 2024, Bladee released his seventh studio album Cold Visions on his Trash Island label.

In September, Bladee, Ecco2k, Thaiboy Digital, Gud as well as Yung Lean all separately announced they had parted ways with Year0001. In an interview with Pitchfork, Bladee stated, "It just ended bad... A lot of stuff wasn’t what we thought it was, so we had to part ways. I don’t owe them my next five projects, so it is what it is".

==== 2025 ====
On 30 April, Bladee released an EP titled Ste the Beautiful Martyr 1st Attempt. In December of the same year, Bladee released two singles with Brazilian funk artist, MC Lan.

==== 2026 ====
On 8 May, Thaiboy Digital released Paradise, a collaborative EDM and trance album with production collective Swedm®, a collective consisting of Varg²™, Eurohead, Skarp, and Jamesjamesjames. Later in the same month, on 20 May 2026, Bladee released his eighth and most recent studio album, Sulfur Surfer.

On 22 October, Ecco2k released his first solo track in five years, "Aldehydes and Ketones". The track was produced by Gud and features a music video created by Ecco2k which was shot in twelve different countries over six years.

== Musical style and public image ==
Drain Gang is a group of electronic and cloud rap musicians. Although Drain Gang's music is intimate, their lyrics often reflect universal human experiences, rather than specifically their own. The members of Drain Gang are self-taught musicians.

Despite the members of Drain Gang not subscribing to right-wing or white supremacist ideologies, their fanbase was still significantly composed of alt-right people, especially visible during the 2016 United States presidential election. However, Bladee and Ecco2k have increasingly incorporated queer themes into their work, including Ecco2k's feminine presentation in the "Amygdala" music video in 2020. The inclusion of these themes increased the visibility of Drain Gang's LGBTQ listenership and helped nonbinary, queer, and transgender people embrace their own identities. Cassidy George of 032c wrote: "Drain Gang’s ability to articulate a strain of suffering that is specific to the internet age has bred a fandom encompassing the two most extreme poles of the contemporary political spectrum".

=== Influence ===
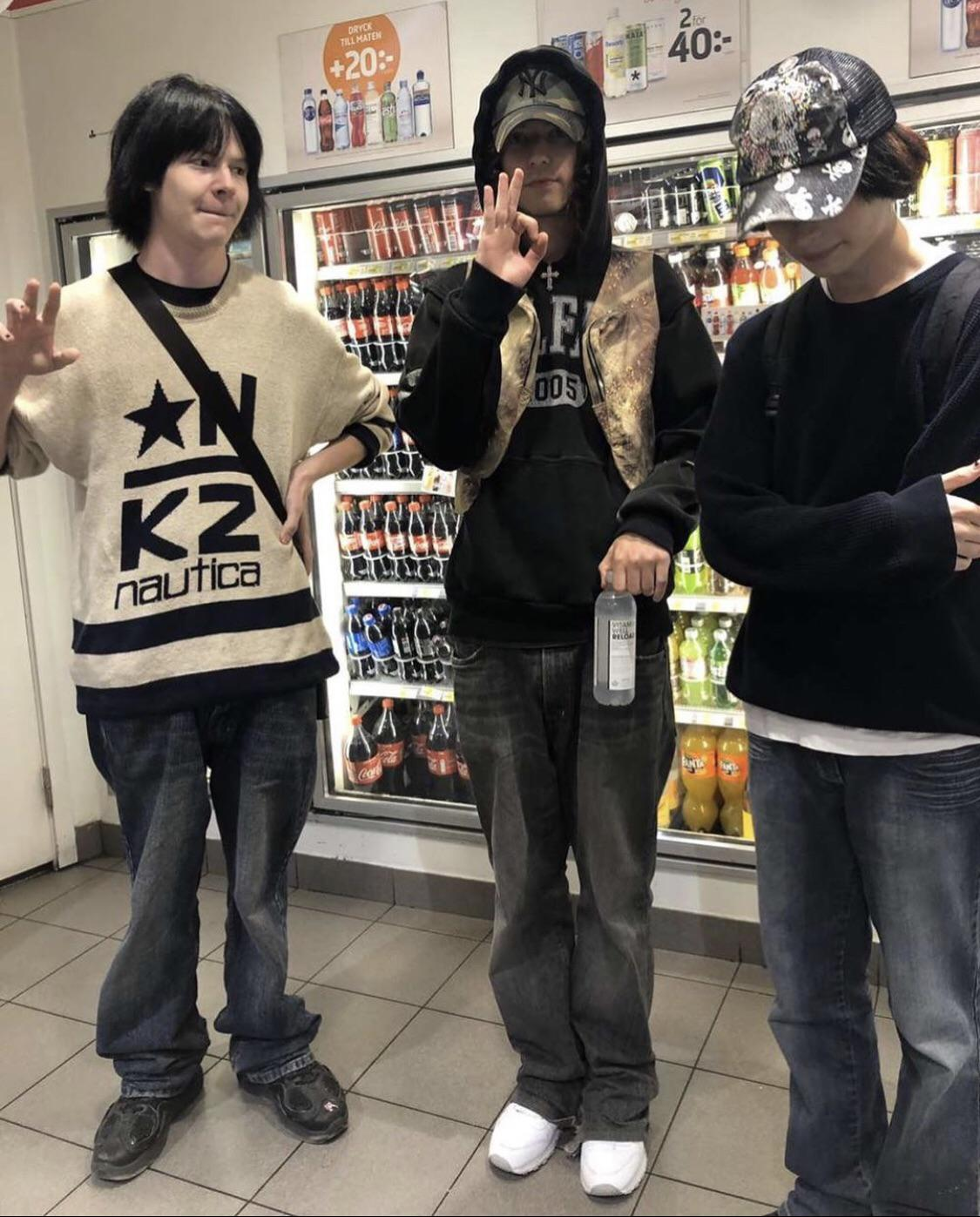
Bladee in a 7-Eleven with 2 drainers

British magazine Dazed stated that the hyperpop music genre had become a catch-all for various acts including Drain Gang. In 2022, they stated that "Drain is officially a genre". Drain Gang inspired the genre "draincore," later renamed to digicore. According to Pitchfork, a fan of Drain Gang is colloquially referred to as a "drainer".

== Collaborative discography ==
- GTBSG Compilation (2013) (Bladee, Ecco2k and Thaiboy Digital)
- AvP (2016) (Bladee and Thaiboy Digital)
- D&G (2017) (Bladee, Ecco2k and Thaiboy Digital)
- Trash Island (2019) (Bladee, Ecco2k, and Thaiboy Digital)
- Crest (2022) (Bladee and Ecco2k)

== See also ==
- Swedish hip-hop
