= Red Light (Bladee album) =

Studio album by Bladee
- Released: 11 May 2018
- Genre: Cloud rap
- Length: 40:08
- Label: Year0001
- Producer: Whitearmor

Bladee chronology
Working on Dying (2017)	Red Light (2018)	Icedancer (2018)

Singles from Red Light
- 1. "Decay" Released: 2 May 2018

Red Light is the second studio album by the Swedish rapper Bladee, released by Year0001 on 11 May 2018. It was produced and executive produced by Whitearmor, with guest contributions from Ecco2k and Uli K of Bala Club. Bladee's frequent collaborators Yung Sherman and Gud provided additional production.

Red Light is an emo album driven by Auto-Tuned vocals, sparkling synthesizers, and ethereal compositions. It was promoted by its only single, "Decay", and a performance at the O2 Academy Islington in London. HotNewHipHop received the album positively, while Anthony Fantano gave the album a negative review; retrospectively, the review has been seen as infamous by 032c and Fantano has called it one of his most negative reviews ever.

== Background and release ==
Bladee released his debut studio album Eversince on 25 May 2016, and received a positive review from the Nordic magazine Gaffa. He is also a key figure in the Swedish hip-hop scene and a founder of Drain Gang. He established a reputation for himself alongside frequent collaborator Yung Lean during the flourishing cloud rap scene in the mid-2010s. Later in 2016, he released the collaborative album AvP with Thaiboy Digital, which was followed by the mixtape Working on Dying in 2017. Later that year, the collaborative Drain Gang album D&G was released. "Decay", the only single for his next album, Red Light, was released on 2 May 2018, alongside a music video. The album was released by Year0001 on 11 May 2018. Later that week, he performed at the O2 Academy Islington in London. The album was later reissued on CD in 2019, and on vinyl in 2022 and 2023.

== Composition ==
Frankie Dunn from i-D classified Red Light as an emo album. Nicolaus Li of Hypebeast said the album "ranges from genre bending pop hybrids to experimental ballads". Multiple publications highlighted the album's use of Auto-Tune. Writing for The Fader, Steffanee Wang said that Bladee's words are distorted by the Auto-Tune on the track "Decay". For HotNewHipHop, Mitch Findlay called the production "whimsical", while Wang described "Decay" as "healing and euphoric". Findlay also highlighted the album's "twinkling synths and atmospheric arrangements", as well as commented on how the album is reminiscent of Yung Lean's 2017 album Stranger. He further wrote that Bladee is "capable of painting a discernible picture".

Red Light's opening track, "1D", is named after the English-Irish boy band One Direction. Explaining why he chose that as the title, Bladee stated: "I feel like me and my friends are the new One Direction 'cause the fans love us, we created our own lane, and now we're helping the youth create their own identities and love life." The album was produced and executive produced by Whitearmor, with additional production from frequent collaborators Yung Sherman and Gud. It includes guest contributions from Ecco2k and Uli K of Bala Club.

== Critical reception ==
Professional ratings
Review scores
Source	Rating
The Needle Drop	1/10 (Note: Specifically, Fantano rated the album a "light to decent 1".)

Following the release of Red Light, the album received a positive review from HotNewHipHop. Findlay identified "Fake News" as a standout track for its "accessible melodic line". He concluded his review by stating: "If you're looking for something to drift off too, Red Light may very well be the remedy." Anthony Fantano gave the album a negative review, which Cassidy George from 032c has called "infamous" and described his one out of ten rating as "scathing". Fantano called Bladee's singing "near tone-deaf" and believed it would've been better as an instrumental album. He further commented that Bladee is "intolerable", and that "he sounds almost as lifeless, tuneless, flavourless, and one-dimensional as Nav". Retrospectively, Fantano said that his review of Red Light is one of his most negative ever.

== Track listing ==
All tracks are produced by Whitearmor.

Red Light track listing
No.	Title	Writer(s)	Length
1.	"1D"	Benjamin Reichwald; Ludwig Rosenberg	2:42
2.	"Golden Boy"	Axel Tufvesson; Reichwald; Rosenberg	3:29
3.	"Westfield"	Jean Christophe; Reichwald; Rosenberg	2:35
4.	"Fake News"	Christophe; Reichwald; Rosenberg	2:39
5.	"Steve Jobs"	Reichwald; Rosenberg	2:29
6.	"Obedient" (featuring Ecco2k)	Zak Arogundade; Reichwald; Rosenberg	2:59
7.	"For You" (featuring Ecco2k)	Arogundade; Reichwald; Rosenberg	2:36
8.	"Hex"	Reichwald; Rosenberg	2:40
9.	"Nike Just Do It"	Reichwald; Rosenberg	4:02
10.	"That Thing You Do" (featuring Uli K)	Uli Padilla; Reichwald; Rosenberg	2:54
11.	"Decay"	Reichwald; Rosenberg	2:08
12.	"College Boy"	Carl-Mikael Berlander; Reichwald; Rosenberg	3:02
13.	"Puppet Master"	Reichwald; Rosenberg	2:41
14.	"I'm Goofy"	Reichwald; Rosenberg	3:12
Total length:			40:08

== Personnel ==
Credits adapted from the Year0001 website.

- Whitearmor – executive production
- Gud – additional production
- Yung Sherman – additional production
- Ripsquad – additional production
- Morgan Nicolajsen – mastering
- Daniel Swan – art direction
- Bladee – additional art
- Hannah Diamond – photography

== Release history ==
Region	Date	Format(s)	Label	Edition	Ref.
Sweden	11 May 2018	Streaming	Year0001	Original	
Sweden	2019	CD	Year0001	Reissue	
United States	26 May 2022	LP	Year0001	Reissue	
Worldwide	1 September 2023	LP	Year0001	Reissue	
