= Tohji =

Japanese rapper

- Born: 1996 (age 29–30); London, UK
- Occupation: Musician
- Musical career
- Genres: Cloud rap, Japanese hip-hop
- Years active: 2017–present
- Labels: Eastern Margins

Tohji is a rapper born in London, United Kingdom. He moved to Japan at a young age, and is based in Tokyo.

== History ==
Tohji rose to prominence after reaching the finals of Japanese TV show Rapstar Tanjo. He released his first EP, 1996, in 2017. He would continue to release music independently over the next few years. He released his first mixtape, T-mix, in 2022. In 2023, he featured on fellow rapper Le Makeup's album Odorata. Tohji headlined the Japanese rap festival 'Pop Yours' in 2024. In 2025, he released twin EPs Zero-One and Zero-Two through Eastern Margins. The two EP's were made at the same time, and are considered to be two halves of one whole.

Tohji announced in late 2025 that he plans to retire from music in 2026.

He is part of the group Mall Boyz with fellow rapper Gummyboy.

== Style ==
Tohji is often associated with cloud rap artists such as Drain Gang. His mixtape T-Mix included a feature from Bladee, and production by Mechatok. Tohji releases music in both English and Japanese, saying that it's his "most natural way to express".

=== Mixtapes ===
No.	Album details
1	Angel: Released: August 7, 2019
2	T-Mix: Released: June 3, 2022

=== EPs ===
No.	Album details
1	1996: Released: September 1, 2017
2	9.97: Released: July 21, 2018
3	Broken EP: Released: January 26, 2022
4	Zero-One: Released: March 7, 2025
5	Zero-Two: Released: May 30, 2025
