= Spiderr =

2022 studio album by Bladee

Studio album by Bladee
- Released: 30 September 2022
- Genres: Pop; hip-hop
- Length: 31:19
- Label: Year0001
- Producers: Gud; Joakim Benon; Whitearmor

Bladee chronology
Crest (2022)	Spiderr (2022)	Psykos (2024)

Singles from Spiderr
- 1. "Drain Story" Released: 15 September 2022

Spiderr is the sixth solo studio album by the Swedish rapper Bladee. It was released by Year0001 on 30 September 2022. It was produced by Whitearmor with contributions from Gud and Joakim Benon, and contains guest appearances from Ecco2k and Wondha Mountain. Bladee announced Spiderr on Instagram in September 2022, alongside the release of its lead single "Drain Story". Spiderr is a pop and hip-hop album that builds upon his previous albums while using new sounds. It received positive reviews from multiple publications, subsequently appearing on the best albums of the year list compiled by The Line of Best Fit and best hip-hop albums of the year list compiled by Slant Magazine.

== Background and release ==
Bladee released his fifth studio album The Fool in May 2021, to praise from Pitchfork and laut.de. Earlier in 2021, he worked with Charli XCX on the remix of his song "Drama" with Mechatok. In March 2022, he released the collaborative studio album Crest with Ecco2k, which also received praise from Pitchfork and laut.de, as well as from Anthony Fantano. He also embarked on a tour across North America and Europe with Drain Gang throughout 2022.

On 15 September 2022, Bladee announced Spiderr on his Instagram story, where he shared a link to the music video of the album's only single "Drain Story". The music video was directed, shot, and edited by Ecco2k; "Icarus 3reestyle" also received a music video. The Hebrew writing on the album cover means "Truth". The album was released by Year0001 on 30 September 2022. It was produced by Whitearmor, with contributions from Gud and Joakim Benon, and contains guest appearances from Wondha Mountain and Ecco2k.

== Composition ==
=== Overview ===
Critics have described Spiderr as containing elements of pop music and hip-hop. Pitchfork's Colin Joyce highlighted the album's "vision of pop that's grounded in real emotion" and otherworldly aesthetics. Yannik Gölz from laut.de noted the use of catchy "pop elements behind a very unusual façade", citing the songs "I Am Slowly but Surely Losing Hope" and "Dresden Er" as examples. Thejas Varma from The Michigan Daily thought the album "keeps up Bladee's consistent streak of electrifying twists on pop and hip-hop, building on previous works while incorporating new sounds". Paul Attard of Slant Magazine called it a "for-the-fans affair that might make even the most die-hard of Drainers re-consider their unfailing loyalty" and that "some of the compositions are so chaotic that they feel like they're about to come apart at the seams". Gölz further wrote that the album "emulates the mood swings of its unstable protagonist, who is capable of great euphoria and great sadness behind the absent façade".

=== Songs ===
Spiderr's opening track is "Understatement", a chiptune and drill track that was compared by Attard to the 16-bit era of music. It contains hi-hats, bass drops, "blocky audio textures", and Attard said it "sounds like it was filtered through a Super Nintendo console". The track is about people not listening to what Bladee says properly, but still idolizing him. The following "It's OK to Not Be OK" was called "assuring" by Fantano, who also thought it contained "icy guitars and keys" and is a "sweet little motif". "I Am Slowly but Surely Losing Hope" suddenly shifts to pop-punk and explores themes of weakness, dejection, and despair. Joyce considered it one of the most "tumultuous arrangements" in Bladee's discography so far, achieved by pairing the "chattering" electronics, signature to Whitearmor's style, with "ragged" guitars. "Icarus 3reestyle" is a digicore song that contains distorted bass, "wailing" sirens, and a reference to the holy trinity. "Nothingg" notably incorporates of steel dancehall drums, and features Wondha Mountain on a hook singing in Mongolian. The Fader's Raphael Helfand believed that "Blue Crush Angel" sees Bladee taking a pause from "his seemingly constant search for innovation"; revisiting his old source material. in particular his "gloomy" synthesizers reminiscent of Yung Lean and the Sadboys, and the use of "cryptic aphorisms" in his lyrics that were described by Helfand as "Easter eggs".

Speaking about the track "Disaster Prelude", Fantano singled out the lo-fi production, and thought that Bladee and Ecco2k's performances were not as lively as they were on Crest. "Hahah" begins with Bladee repeating the phrase "I'm crazy" 50 times. It contains "sparkling" synthesizers and a kissing sound effect, and ends with the line "I'm doing great". "Drain Story" features stuttering and slithering synthesizers, stumbling percussion, boyish vocals, and breathy ad-libs. Attard said it "sounds like a bunch of Bop Its being tossed down a flight of stairs", and that Bladee stutters during the opening lines, as if he recently woke up. Fantano detailed "Velociraptor" as having "buzzing synthesizers" and "very aggressive perks", also highlighting its "crunched up guitar fragments". He added that Bladee's vocals are "animated" and called its lyrics "surreal poetry". The following "Dresden ER" was compared by Attard to a church hymn, who also described it as a "sing-along". The song contains the line "Life is but a joke", which Joyce believed was an example of Bladee trying to weaken the emotional moments on the album. The penultimate track "She's Always Dancing" explores the topics of reality and creation, and references Hebrew, alongside the closing track "Uriel Outro". Lyrically, the latter track sees Bladee praying to the "angel of artistic perfection", praising her, and asking for her blessing in his future work.

== Critical reception ==
Professional ratings
Review scores
Source	Rating
laut.de	4/5 stars
The Needle Drop	7/10 (Note: Specifically, Fantano rated the album a "decent to strong 7".)
Pitchfork	7.7/10
Slant Magazine	4/5 stars

Spiderr received positive reviews from critics. Attard called it "one of Bladee's most exciting releases to date", presenting Bladee "at the peak of his abilities" and showing why his musical skills should be taken more seriously. Gölz from laut.de called the album sonically unique and lyrically more nuanced, compared to its predecessors in Bladee's discography. He was further impressed by Bladee's ability to "musically wallow in fantasies-like collages", assembled out of aesthetic interests in religion themes, esotericism, and hip-hop. Writing for Pitchfork, Joyce thought that the album sees Bladee re-establishing himself as a musician by sharing his spiritual ideas with his "devoted cult of followers". While Fantano believed there were "some pockets that [he] was hoping for more from", he thought it proved Bladee's music to be versatile and overall enjoyed the album.

The staff from The Line of Best Fit considered Spiderr to be the 36th best album of 2022, with Sophie Walker writing that "every moment of this record feels like a transmission from another realm entirely, and it's a privilege that Bladee is taking us with him". She further believed that "Spiderr feels like his most vulnerable, communicative project yet". Slant Magazine put it on their list of "The 20 Best Hip-Hop Albums of 2022".

== Track listing ==
All tracks are written by Benjamin Reichwald and Ludwig Rosenberg, except where noted. All tracks are produced by Whitearmor, except where noted.

Spiderr track listing
No.	Title	Writer(s)	Producer(s)	Length
1.	"Understatement"			3:08
2.	"It's OK to Not Be OK"			1:17
3.	"I Am Slowly but Surely Losing Hope"			2:33
4.	"Icarus 3reestyle"			2:06
5.	"Nothingg" (featuring Wondha Mountain)	Reichwald; Rosenberg; Odmunkh Natsagdorj		3:06
6.	"Blue Crush Angel"			3:14
7.	"Disaster Prelude" (featuring Ecco2k)	Reichwald; Rosenberg; Carl Berlander; Zak Arogundade	Whitearmor; Gud	1:57
8.	"Hahah"			2:16
9.	"Drain Story"			1:50
10.	"Velociraptor"			2:18
11.	"Dresden Er"			2:55
12.	"She's Always Dancing"	Reichwald; Rosenberg; Joakim Benon	Whitearmor; Benon	1:48
13.	"Uriel Outro"			2:51
Total length:				31:19

== Personnel ==
Credits adapted from the Year0001 website.

- Whitearmor – production
- Gud – production
- Joakim Benon – production
- Ludwig Rosenberg – mixing
- Gabriel Schuman – co-mixing, mastering
- Sathyan Rizzo – cover art
