= Whitearmor =

Swedish musician & music producer

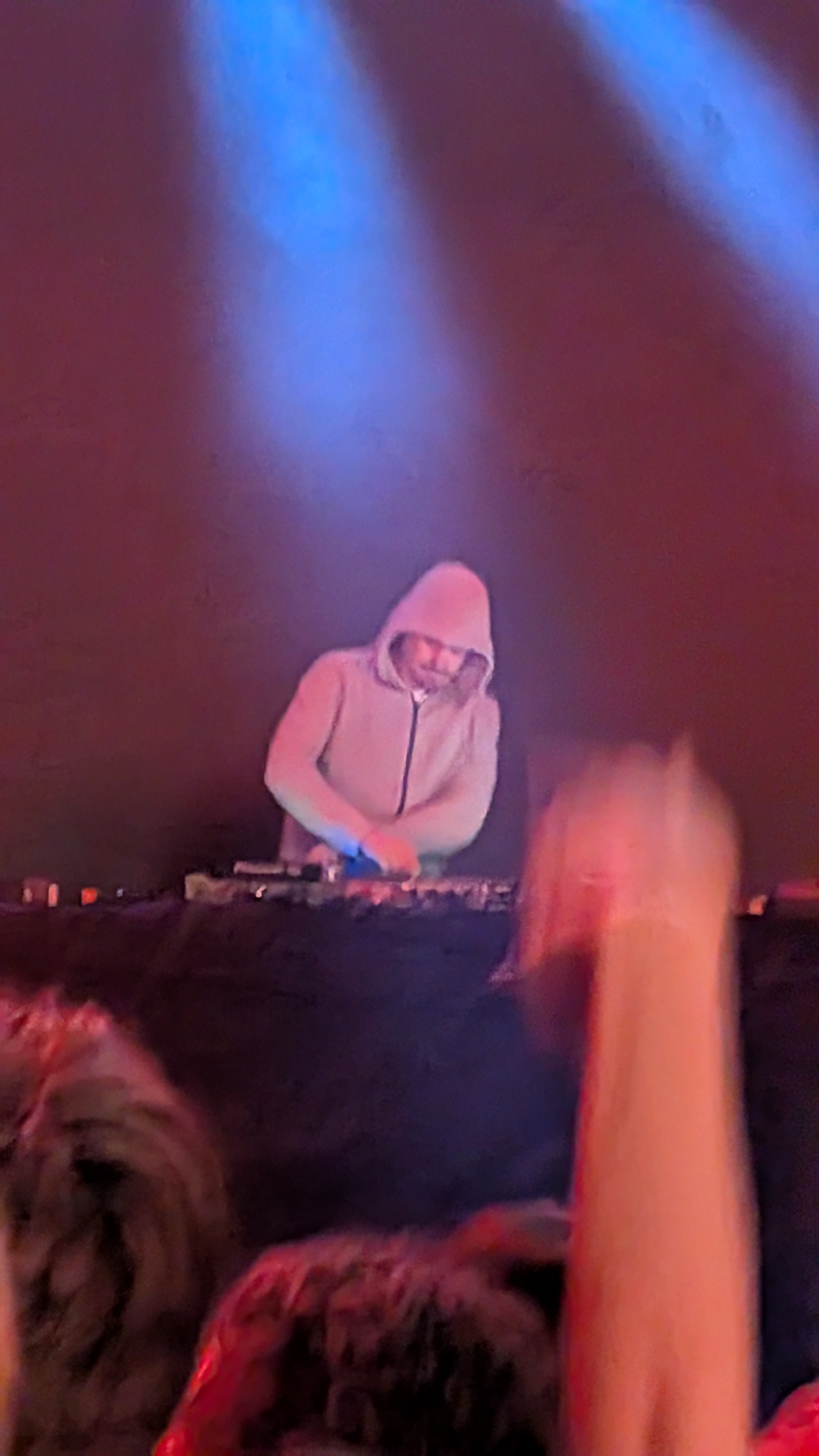
- Rosenberg in 2026

Background information
- Born: Ludwig Tomas Walther Rosenberg; 25 May 1993 (age 33); Stockholm, Sweden
- Genres: Ambient; cloud rap; synthpop; trap; experimental hip hop
- Occupations: Music producer, multi-instrumentalist, audio engineer, songwriter
- Instruments: DAW; synthesizer; guitar; piano; drums; keyboard
- Years active: 2010-present
- Labels: Year0001; Trash Island
- Member of: Drain Gang; VilloVilduVeta

Ludwig Tomas Walther Rosenberg (born 25 May 1993), professionally known as Whitearmor (often stylized in lowercase or as White Armor), is a Swedish music producer, multi-instrumentalist, audio engineer and songwriter. He is best known for being a member of the Swedish music group and artist collective Drain Gang (along with Bladee, Ecco2k, Thaiboy Digital). His musical style has been described as softly textured and fluid.

Aside from producing much of Drain Gang's and adjacent artist Yung Lean's music, he has released several solo singles, as well as a full-length instrumental album in 2022, In the Abyss: Music for Weddings. He has also collaborated with musicians such as Gud, Mechatok, Xavier Wulf, Uli K, and Working on Dying.

He is also one half of music duo VilloVilduVeta, together with Joakim Benon, a member of the Swedish band JJ.

== Early life ==
Ludwig Tomas Walther Rosenberg was born on 25 May 1993 in Stockholm, Sweden. He grew up listening to a wide range of artists including Bob Marley, Slipknot, and various Atlanta trap artists like Waka Flocka Flame. As a teenager, he began playing drums in an indie-rock band before becoming interested in and producing electronic and hip-hop music.

== Music career ==
Rosenberg began uploading music to the internet in 2010 under the names DJ Creep and DJ Cannabiz before adopting the name Whitearmor in 2012. While most of his music from this time has since been removed from the internet, some tracks have survived, including "Tony Hawk" (with Ken Burns & Malcolm S.), "THC Bliss", "Enya #6", and "Downer". In 2011, he released Rippin Private Bowls, an instrumental hip-hop cassette under Nymph Tapes.

In 2013, Whitearmor co-founded the Swedish music collective Drain Gang along with fellow Swedish musicians Bladee, Ecco2k, Thaiboy Digital and Yung Sherman. Whitearmor's earliest publicly available collaboration with a fellow Drain Gang member was the 2012 single "Oxygen", which he produced for Bladee. On 12 August 2013, the group released their debut compilation GTBSG Compilation, with Whitearmor working on 10 of the 12 songs featured. In addition to his work with the rest of Drain Gang, Whitearmor is also a close collaborator of the Swedish music collective Sad Boys, who are close collaborators of Drain Gang. Sad Boys is a group that consists of rapper and singer Yung Lean and producers Gud and Drain Gang member Yung Sherman.

In 2019, he formed the music duo VilloVilduVeta with Swedish musician Joakim Benon, with their debut song Nästan being used in the 2019 Sad Boys/Converse "One Wish" campaign. They released their debut album Längtan får vingar on 2 July 2021. Whitearmor co-produced and wrote the entire album with Benon and also served as the project's mixing engineer. Later that year in October, they released the single Nikita.

In 2020, he worked with Yung Lean on Lean's side project Jonatan Leandoer96 (stylized in lowercase), contributing guitar, synthesizer and additional vocals to Leandoer96's single Evil from the album Blodhundar + Lullabies.

In 2022, Whitearmor released his debut studio album In the Abyss: Music for Weddings. The album was composed, produced, performed, and mixed entirely by Rosenberg. Mastering of the album was done by Robin Schmidt, an audio engineer who has been a frequent collaborator of Whitearmor and the rest of Drain Gang as a mastering engineer. It contains elements of ambient and new age, being described as soothing, uplifting and accessible, likening to mid-80s Haruomi Hosono.

He also took part in the 2022 Drain Gang tour that spanned 23 performances in North America and Europe, which included an additional performance at Primavera Sound in Barcelona, Spain.

While as of 2025 Rosenberg has not made any official statement, most of his close musical collaborators have officially cut ties with Stockholm-based record label Year0001 in November 2024.

== Discography ==
=== Albums ===
- 2022 – In the Abyss: Music for Weddings

=== Singles ===
- 2014 – downer
- 2014 – uu
- 2014 – i kno
- 2020 – Frutta e Verdura (with Gud)
- 2020 – Karma
- 2021 – Sunset Beach (with Mechatok)
- 2022 – Even The Score (with LUCY (Cooper B. Handy))

=== Remixes ===
- 2017 – Finding People - White Armor Remix (Croatian Armor)

=== Production credits ===
Release	Year	Artist(s)	Production Credits	Ref(s).
Unknown Death 2002	2013	Yung Lean	09. "Emails"; 10. "Deathstar // Getting Benjamins"; 11. "Heal You // Bladerunner"	
GTBSG Compilation	2013	Drain Gang	Entirely produced by Rosenberg except: 02. "Bladeecity" (produced by Josh Diamond); 06. "Hold Me Down Like Gravity" (co-produced with Yung Sherman); 08. "Diamondz" (produced by Curtis Heron & DJ Smokey)	
Gluee	2014	Bladee	02. "Safehouse" (co-produced with Yung Sherman); 03. "Ebay"; 04. "Shadowface"; 05. "Spellbound"; 09. "Unreal"	
Unknown Memory	2014	Yung Lean	03. "Sunrise Angel"; 10. "Volt" (co-produced with Gud); 11. "Leanworld"	
"Into Dust"	2014	Bladee	Single produced by Rosenberg.	
Tiger (also known as ส)	2014	Thaiboy Digital	Entirely produced by Rosenberg except: 01. "Haters Broke" (co-produced with Gud); 08. "Yr So Beautiful" (produced by Yung Sherman); 09. "Vän" (co-produced with Gud)	
Warlord	2016	Yung Lean	04. "Afghanistan" (co-produced with Gud); 06. "Fire"; 08. "Eye Contact"; 12. "Shawty U Know What It Do" (co-produced with Yung Sherman)	
Eversince	2016	Bladee	Entirely produced by Rosenberg except: 09. "Sugar" (co-produced with Rip); 10. "Wrist Cry" (co-produced with Hitkidd)	
AvP	2016	Bladee & Thaiboy Digital	Entirely produced by Rosenberg.	
Frost God	2016	Yung Lean	04. "Cashin"; 06. "Kirby" (co-produced with Acea); 07. "Head 2 Toe" (co-produced with Acea); 08. "Get It Back"	
D&G	2017	Drain Gang	Entirely produced by Rosenberg except: 02. "Black Boy" (co-produced with Rip); 07. "Can't Trust" (co-produced with Woesum); 13. "Scarecrows" (co-produced with Yung Sherman); 17. "Climbing" (co-produced with Gud)	
Stranger	2017	Yung Lean	04. "Silver Arrows" (co-produced with Gud); 07. "Salute/Pacman"; 08. "Drop It/Scooter" (co-produced with Gud); 09. "Hunting My Own Skin" (co-produced with Gud); 10. "Iceman"	
Working on Dying	2017	Bladee	07. "Gatekeeper" (co-produced with F1lthy)	
Red Light	2018	Bladee	Entirely produced by Rosenberg except: 02. "Golden Boy" (co-produced with Yung Sherman); 03. "Westfield" (co-produced with Rip); 04. "Fake News" (co-produced with Rip); 12. "College Boy" (co-produced with Gud)	
Sunset in Silver City	2018	Bladee	Entirely produced by Rosenberg.	
Exile	2018	Bladee	Entirely produced by Rosenberg.	
Poison Ivy	2018	Yung Lean	Entirely produced by Rosenberg.	
Icedancer	2018	Bladee	07. "Close" (co-produced with PJ Pipe It Up and Rip)	
"Trash Star"	2019	Bladee	Single produced by Rosenberg.	
Total Eclipse	2019	Yung Lean	01. "2 Cups"	
"Apple"	2019	Bladee	Single produced by Rosenberg.	
Trash Island	2019	Drain Gang	Entirely produced by Rosenberg except: 07. "Acid Rain" (co-produced with Mechatok); 08. "You Lose" (co-produced with Lusi)	
Legendary Member	2019	Thaiboy Digital	05. "IDGAF" (co-produced with Gud); 09. "Beijing" (co-produced with Gud); 10. "Spinnin" (co-produced with Gud); 11. "Baby (Legendary Member)" (co-produced with Gud & Woesum)	
E	2019	Ecco2k	06. "Cc" (co-produced with Gud); 07. "Calcium"; 08. "Sugar & Diesel"; 09. "Don’t Ask"; 13. "Life After Life"	
Starz	2020	Yung Lean	Entirely produced by Rosenberg except: 06. "Dance In The Dark" (co-produced with Yung Sherman); 09. "Hellraiser" (co-produced with Yung Sherman); 12. "Iceheart" (co-produced with Yung Sherman)	
"Opium Dreams"	2020	Yung Lean & Bladee	Single produced by Rosenberg.	
333	2020	Bladee	Entirely produced by Rosenberg except: 04. "Hero of My Story 3style3" (co-produced with Lusi); 08. "Reality Surf" (co-produced with Gud); 09. "Noblest Strive" (co-produced with Mechatok); 11. "Oh Well" (co-produced with Lusi); 15. "Only One" (co-produced with Joakim Benon)	
Blodhundar & Lullabies	2020	jonatan leandoer96	13. "Evil" (guitar, synthesizer, additional vocals)	
Crest	2022	Bladee & Ecco2k	Entirely produced by Rosenberg.	
Stardust	2022	Yung Lean	03. "Gold" (co-produced with Fredrik Okazaki & Woesum); 05. "All the things" (co-produced with Woesum, Jack Donoghue & Fredrik Okazaki)	
"I'm Fresh"	2022	Thaiboy Digital	Single produced by Rosenberg.	
Spiderr	2022	Bladee	Entirely produced by Rosenberg except: 07. "Disaster Prelude" (co-produced with Gud); 12. "She's Always Dancing" (co-produced with Joakim Benon)	
Back 2 Life	2022	Thaiboy Digital	12. "Never Change"	
Victorious // Bullets	2023	Bladee & Yung Lean	Entirely produced by Rosenberg.	
Requiem	2023	Bladee	Entirely produced by Rosenberg.	
"TL;DR"	2024	Bladee, Ecco2k, Thaiboy Digital	Single produced by Rosenberg.	
Cold Visions	2024	Bladee	10. "I Don't Like People (Whitearmor Interlude)"; 18. "Terrible Excellence" (co-produced with F1lthy, 100yrd and Gabriel Schuman); 30. "Cold Visions (Outro 2)" (co-produced with Yung Sherman)	
Fuck U Skrillex You Think Ur Andy Warhol but Ur Not!!	2025	Skrillex	18. "KORABU" (co-produced with Skrillex, PARISI and Varg2)	
"Advent"	2025	Bladee & Yung Lean	Single produced by Rosenberg.	
Sulfur Surfer	2026	Bladee	Entirely produced by Rosenberg.	
