= The Fool (Bladee album) =

Studio album by Bladee
- Released: 28 May 2021
- Genres: Cloud rap; pop rap; trap
- Length: 32:24
- Label: Year0001
- Producers: Clibbo; Loesoe; Lusi; Outtatown; Rip; Rok

Bladee chronology
Good Luck (2020)	The Fool (2021)	Crest (2022)

The Fool is the fifth solo studio album by the Swedish rapper Bladee. A surprise album, it was released on 28 May 2021, through Year0001. The album was produced by Lusi with contributions from a variety of record producers. The Fool is a pop rap album that scales back and softens the sounds used in Bladee's previous album, Good Luck (2020) with Mechatok. Using Auto-Tuned vocals, the album explores themes of love, illusions, and existentialism. Its title is a reference to the tarot card of the same name and extends as a metaphor into the album itself. Fellow Drain Gang member Thaiboy Digital is featured on the track "Inspiration Comes". The Fool was considered one of the best albums of the year by The Fader and Dazed, and received further approval from Pitchfork and laut.de.

== Background and release ==
In 2020, Bladee released two solo albums, Exeter and 333. Later that year, he collaborated with the musician Mechatok on Good Luck, an album that delved into electronic dance music. The album's title is a reference to the tarot card of the same name and extends as a metaphor into the album itself. Further leaning into the playing cards narrative, Pitchfork's Nadine Smith proposed that "the record is like a full hand, each card representing a different side of Bladee or character he embodies". The Fool was released as a surprise album on 28 May 2021 via Year0001.

== Composition ==
=== Overview ===
The Fool was classified as pop rap by Malin Hacker of laut.de. Other publications considered it a mix between electronic dance music, dance-pop, synth-pop, and trap. The Fool scales back and softens the sound of Good Luck and incorporates trap drums into its songs. Nicolaus Li of Hypebeast described the album's instrumentals as "frenetic", and that they are "dominated by tittering hi-hats and bouncing bass hits." He also said that the album had an increased pace when compared to Exeter and 333. Some publications compared the sound of The Fool to Bladee's 2018 mixtape Icedancer.

The album presents layered Auto-Tuned vocals with lyrics that explore themes of love, illusions, and existentialism, and plays with spiritual references. Günseli Yalcinkaya of Dazed wrote that the album "trades in the transcendental maximalism of [his] previous releases for a more pared back approach", calling the sound "unmistakably Bladee" and the lyrics "introspective". For Pitchfork, Smith wrote that Bladee "meld[s] the lyrical tropes and trap drums of American rap, the emotions and ethereality of European dance music, and the experimentation of pop’s new international vanguard." Salvatore Maicki of The Fader wrote that during the album, Bladee's fears, infatuations, trials, and tribulations hide in plain sight. He also described the album's sound as "quintessential Bladee in every regard". The Fool also marked a shift in Bladee's lyrical subject matter. Massimo Tarridas of The Miscellany News wrote that it changed from "mall-obsessed conspicuous consumption" to "confessing sin and searching for places beyond lust and temptations of love."

=== Songs ===
The Fool contains 13 tracks. The opening track is "The Fool Intro"; its opening synth lead was compared to "Futsal Shuffle 2020" (2019) by Lil Uzi Vert. On the track, Bladee's voice switches between a "whispered scream" and a rapped falsetto according to Tarridas. "Let's Ride" contains Rich Homie Quan references as Bladee represents a character of "the reluctantly boastful MC riding a BMX bike" according to Smith. The instrumental of "Hotel Breakfast" was compared to the music in an Animal Crossing game due to its "camera shutter sound effects and dinky keyboards." Tarridas called Bladee's flow on the track "mumbled", "awkward", and "charming". The following "I Think..." is a melodic ballad that contemplates the duality of life. The synth lines during "Thee 9 Is Up" and the penultimate "Search True" were described as "kaleidoscopic" and "trance-like" by Smith. Smith described Bladee's character on "Desiree" as "the sensitive crooner and lover". "I Want It That Way" and "Egobaby" are other tracks that contain falsettos, which were described by critics as "angelic". "Bby" was also compared to "Futsal Shuffle 2020" due to its repeated samples of electronic dance music. Fellow Drain Gang member Thaiboy Digital is featured on "Inspiration Comes", a track that has "facettenreiche lyrics [multi-faceted lyrics]" that "verschaffen komplexität [add complexity]" according to Hacker. The following "Trendy" is a track about understanding your self-worth that is backed by oscillated Auto-Tuned harmonies over hi-hats and synthesizers. Smith described Bladee's character during the track as "the admitted Joker of the deck." The final track is "Wett (Water2)".

== Critical reception ==
Professional ratings
Review scores
Source	Rating
laut.de	4/5 stars
The Needle Drop	6/10 (Note: Specifically, Fantano rated the album a "strong 6".)
Pitchfork	7.7/10

Smith wrote that The Fool "features some of his most ear-catching and melodic work yet" in a positive review for Pitchfork. Reviewing for laut.de, Hacker gave it a rating of 4 out of 5 stars. For The Fader, Maicki wrote that the album contains "some of his strongest melodies to date". Writing for The Miscellany News, Tarridas complimented the album's pacing and wrote that "It’s clear there was a lot of care put into the structure of each track". Anthony Fantano criticized Bladee's vocals and called the album Bladee's safest release, but praised his songwriting.

The Fool was named the 11th best album of the year by The Fader. Dazed considered it the 14th best album of the year. In 2025, it appeared in three Official Charts Company charts: the UK Independent Albums at number 43, the UK R&B Albums at number 15, and the UK Record Store at number 26.

== Track listing ==
All lyrics are written by Benjamin Reichwald, except "Inspiration Comes", by Reichwald and Thanapat Bunleang.

No.	Title	Producer(s)	Length
1.	"The Fool Intro"	Lusi	1:59
2.	"Let's Ride"	Lusi	2:25
3.	"Hotel Breakfast"	Lusi; Loesoe; Rok	2:14
4.	"I Think..."	Lusi; Rip; Loesoe	3:11
5.	"Thee 9 Is Up"	Lusi	3:04
6.	"Desiree"	Lusi	2:26
7.	"I Want It That Way"	Lusi	2:02
8.	"Bby"	Lusi; Loesoe; Outtatown	2:00
9.	"Inspiration Comes" (featuring Thaiboy Digital)	Lusi	2:56
10.	"Egobaby"	Lusi	2:18
11.	"Trendy"	Lusi; Loesoe	2:43
12.	"Search True"	Lusi; Clibbo	2:36
13.	"Wett (Water2)"	Lusi	2:25
Total length:			32:24

Notes

- Tracks 6 and 10 are stylised in lower case.
- Track 8 is stylised in all caps.

== Personnel ==
Credits adapted from the Year0001 website.

- Gabriel Schuman – mixing
- Joe LaPorta – mastering
- Cestainsi – art director
- Benjamin Reichwald – art
- Joel Dunkels – additional animation
- Zak Arogundade – photography

== Charts ==
Chart performance for The Fool
Chart (2025)	Peak position
UK Independent Albums (Official Charts)	43
UK R&B Albums (Official Charts)	15
UK Record Store (OCC)	26

== Video sources ==
Fantano, Anthony (12 June 2021). Bladee - The Fool ALBUM REVIEW. The Needle Drop. Archived from the original on 25 November 2024 – via YouTube.
