= Crest (album) =

2022 studio album by Bladee and Ecco2k

Studio album by Bladee and Ecco2k
- Released: 17 March 2022
- Genres: Progressive pop; cloud rap
- Length: 30:56
- Label: Year0001
- Producer: Whitearmor

Bladee chronology
The Fool (2021)	Crest (2022)	Spiderr (2022)

Ecco2k chronology
PXE (2021)	Crest (2022)	Echo (2026)

Singles from Crest
- 1. "Girls Just Want to Have Fun" Released: February 24, 2020

Crest is a collaborative studio album by the Swedish rappers Bladee and Ecco2k, released on 17 March 2022 through Year0001. It was recorded in Sweden with producer Whitearmor, close to the recording location of the film The Seventh Seal (1957). Crest is a progressive pop album featuring Auto-Tune vocals with lyrics addressing themes of love and friendship, and multiple references to Christianity and heaven. It includes "Girls Just Want to Have Fun", which had been released as a single in 2020. Crest was considered one of the best albums of the year by The Fader and one of the best progressive pop albums of the year by Pitchfork. In 2025, it appeared in the UK Independent Albums, UK R&B Albums and UK Record Store charts.

== Background and release ==
To record Crest, Bladee, Ecco2k, and Whitearmor, members of the Swedish collective Drain Gang, rented a small red cottage in the south of Sweden close to the cliff-bound beach from The Seventh Seal (1957), a fantasy epic by Ingmar Bergman. Whitearmor said that the album was heavily inspired by the film and the Swedish band ABBA. The album cover was hand-drawn by Bladee. The track "Girls Just Want to Have Fun" was released as a single on 24 February 2020. Crest was released as a surprise album on 17 March 2022 via Year0001, amidst Drain Gang's world tour.

== Composition ==
Crest was classified as progressive pop by Pitchfork; Sam Goldner wrote that Bladee, Ecco2k, and Whitearmor created a "pure", pop-infused version of their dense cloud rap style, accessing a more widely relatable vibe. Yannik Gölz of laut.de described the album as "cloud rap that has crossed the line into indie and electronica". Cassidy George of 032c felt that describing Crest as "a collection of hymns" was more fitting than describing it as an art-pop album. Nicolaus Li of Hypebeast said that the album "sees the duo showcase their ethereal sonic forms over Whitearmor's evocative beats."

The album presents Auto-Tune vocals with lyrics addressing themes of love and friendship, and multiple spiritual references to Christianity and heaven. (Note: Attributed to multiple references:) Günseli Yalcinkaya of Dazed said that Crest contains nine "meandering" songs that combine the group's "youthful nihilism" with existential-themed lyrics and trance-like synth melodies, while Sam Goldner of Pitchfork said that the album could make the listener feel that "no matter how much time you've wasted online, your real friends are out there somewhere waiting for you". Writing for the same website, Nadine Smith noted how the album, while not explicitly religious, explores the imagery of heaven, angels, and "ectoplasmic intelligence", constructing a spiritual realm that transcends specific doctrines or gods. She also noted how mantras seemed to be essential for Bladee and Ecco2k's songwriting. Gölz said that the album addresses themes of beauty, Christianity, and death while noting that Christian motifs repeatedly appear. Colin Joyce of The Fader said that the artists "strain toward heaven with every ounce of their being".

Keegan Brady of Rolling Stone described the album's recording location as "fitting" due to the album being "distinctly Swedish". Bladee said that, with the album, "[they] began to understand how growing up in Sweden, and being Swedish, is something to be proud of", in contrast to the group's rejection of national pride in their youth. Brady further added that Crest "isn't concerned with nationalism per sé, more like an embrace of, and coming to terms with, one's core roots."

== Songs ==
Crest's first track is "The Flag Is Raised", which, according to Brady, is an anthemic, "exhilarating and spiritually liberating homecoming" that signifies the beginning of a new chapter for the group. Gölz described the instrumental as containing a "heavenly-psychedelic synth", while Anthony Fantano of The Needle Drop described it as a "strong" opener that showcased the album's "beautiful and hypnotic qualities". The album's second track, "5 Star Crest (4 Vattenrum)", is dedicated to Stockholm producer Vattenrum, who died in 2019; he was known for producing some of Drain Gang's earlier songs. The nine-minute production is divided into five parts; Smith described it as "a living and fluid pop organism that's constantly mutating". The song addresses "themes of loss and longing with varied tonal sensibilities", according to Nicolaus Li of Hypebeast, and combines "religious iconography with playful nihilism", according to Yalcinkaya. Yalcinkaya highlighted how Bladee sings "We think we exist, that's why we suffer, do we not?" amidst a bubblegum pop backdrop: "You can practically hear him shrugging." Fantano praised it for containing "some of the prettiest and most captivating moments [in] the entire LP".

The album's third song, "White Meadow", was described by Smith as reaching new heights of pop music for Drain Gang, while Fantano defined it as synth pop, where "the regal and peppy synth leads, as well as the driving beats, make for a very soft backdrop". The next track is "Faust", where Smith noted themes of "yearning for some greater beauty beyond the self" when Ecco2k sings: "I want to live in heaven / I wanna reach closer to you". Fantano described it as containing sticky refrains as Ecco2k sings "If only" repeatedly, while also containing "lots of sugary synth leads bouncing around the mix playfully". He also praised the subtle vocals.

The fifth track, "Yeses (Red Cross)", continues the spiritual themes of the album; Gölz said that it repeated many of the album's Christian motifs. The song also contains falsettos. Joyce said that the song summarized what Bladee and Ecco2k wanted for Crest: "a stubborn, relentless dedication to finding and creating ecstasy and joy in a time of widespread suffering". Fantano felt that Ecco2k's "somewhat mystical and witchy verse on the back end" could be a contrast from the track's Christian references. The sixth song is "Desire Is a Trap"; Fantano commented that it showed a "synth-pop philosophy with a lot of infectious lead melodies and bubbly beats". The album's next track, "Chaos Follows", was considered by Fantano to be one of the darkest songs on the record.

Yalcinkaya described the sixth and eighth tracks, "Desire Is a Trap" and "Girls Just Want to Have Fun", as melodic and dream-like dance-pop songs; regarding the latter, Smith described it as containing a synth-pop background and Auto-Tune vocals, fostering a feminine image as the song references Cyndi Lauper's song of the same name. Salvatore Maicki of The Fader described it as containing an "angelic production", while Torsten Ingvaldsen of Hypebeast said that it contains "an uptempo, experimental pop backdrop". Fantano said that it contained "dreamy vocals and propulsive beats and sweet synths". The album's final track is "Heaven Sings", which Fantano felt "works as a super serene spotlit outro to tie the album's tranquil vibes and dreamlike imagery".

== Critical reception ==
Professional ratings
Review scores
Source	Rating
laut.de	4/5 stars
Pitchfork	8/10
The Needle Drop	8/10 (Note: Fantano gave it a "strong 7 to a light 8".)

According to Cassidy George of 032c, Crest was critically acclaimed. Smith described it as one of the best Drain Gang projects, being "a softly textured and sweetly spiritual quest for something bigger than ourselves". According to Gölz, "Crest is its own musical entity. You don't have to understand it, not even like it, but you can appreciate how completely fresh and strange this sound will remain for years to come." Anthony Fantano of The Needle Drop said that the album was "catchier and much more captivating than [he] anticipated". Günseli Yalcinkaya of Dazed described it as a "[level]-up in [Drain Gang]'s move towards global domination". Brady described it as "a soaring and rapturous triumph that feels like their most ambitious project yet".

The Fader staff considered Crest the 22nd best album of 2022, with Colin Joyce writing: "Can [Bladee and Ecco2k] create heaven on Earth? Probably not. But the pillowy comforts of this record are proof of the power that they can access just by trying." Pitchfork included it in their list of "Best Progressive Pop Music" of the year, while Fantano named it the 48th best album of the year. In 2024, Pitchfork named Crest the 58th best album of the 2020s until then, with Jazz Monroe considering it "the prettiest album Drain Gang's membership has yet produced. In 2025, it appeared in three Official Charts Company charts: the UK Independent Albums at number 40, the UK R&B Albums at number 12, and the UK Record Store at number 25.

== Track listing ==
All tracks are written by Benjamin Reichwald, Zak Arogundade and Ludwig Rosenberg.

No.	Title	Length
1.	"The Flag Is Raised"	2:59
2.	"5 Star Crest (4 Vattenrum)"	8:50
3.	"White Meadow"	3:30
4.	"Faust"	2:06
5.	"Yeses (Red Cross)"	3:02
6.	"Desire Is a Trap"	2:51
7.	"Chaos Follows"	2:31
8.	"Girls Just Want to Have Fun"	2:15
9.	"Heaven Sings"	2:52
Total length:		30:56

== Charts ==
Chart performance for Crest
Chart (2025)	Peak position
UK Independent Albums (Official Charts)	40
UK R&B Albums (Official Charts)	12
UK Record Store (OCC)	25
