= Eversince =

2016 studio album by Bladee

Studio album by Bladee
- Released: 25 May 2016
- Length: 39:29
- Label: Year0001
- Producer: Whitearmor

Bladee chronology
Gluee (2014)	Eversince (2016)	AvP (2016)

Singles from Eversince
- 1. "Missing Person" Released: 17 November 2015; 2. "Who Goes There" Released: 18 May 2016

Eversince is the debut studio album by the Swedish rapper Bladee, released on 25 May 2016, through Year0001. A key figure in the Swedish hip-hop scene and a co-founder of the collective Drain Gang, Bladee was mainly known for his collaborations with Yung Lean during the flourishing cloud rap scene in the mid-2010s. The album was produced by Whitearmor with additional production from Ripsquadd and Hitkidd. It is made up of a variety of genres and a mix of styles. Eversince received a positive review from the Nordic magazine Gaffa, who believed it allowed Bladee to come into his own.

== Background and composition ==
Bladee has been making music since age 11. He and his childhood best friend Ecco2k created a punk band, which was disbanded as the two got older. When he began an interest in graffiti, he met Thaiboy Digital and Whitearmor. The three formed the collective that ended up being Drain Gang. They later met Yung Lean and Yung Sherman of Sad Boys, a collective making similar music to Drain Gang. After releasing his debut mixtape Gluee in 2014, Bladee became a key figure in Swedish hip-hop and established a reputation for himself alongside Yung Lean in Stockholm's flourishing cloud rap scene during the mid-2010s. When making the album, Bladee would think of lyrics in his head and then write them down. It was entirely produced by Whitearmor.

Craig Jenkins of Vice called Eversince "a strange amalgam of modern rap, R&B, gothic, new wave, and electronic music". He further wrote that Whitearmor's production evokes "shimmering crystal palaces and stark glacial landscapes". He described the tracks "Romeo" and "Xd Out" as "breakup anthem[s]". Complex's Joe Price said Bladee's music "sits somewhere between Future and the Cure" and called it "a complete mix of styles far and wide", including inspirations of J-pop and Elliott Smith. Cassidy George from 032c said the album "sounds like fragile masculinity in the throes of a millennial crisis". For Gaffa, Jonathan Eklund called Whitearmor's production electronic and euphoric. He described the opening track "Who Goes There" as "drug-loving" (Note: This quote is a translation of the original text: "Drogälskande") and "Sugar" as a "real hit song". (Note: This quote is a translation of the original text: "riktiga hitlåten") The Fader's Duncan Cooper thought that "Lovenote" and "Wrist Cry" had more aggressive instrumentals, and described "Xd Out" and the closing track "Skin" as ballads. Writing for the same magazine, Jack Angell described Eversince as "frostbitten futurism", and thought the lyric "R.I.P. my hopes and dreams, I don't wanna wake up" in the song "Rip" "leaned into deeply depressive territory".

== Release and reception ==
Professional ratings
Review scores
Source	Rating
Gaffa	5/6 stars

Eversince's lead single "Missing Person" was released on 17 November 2015, on SoundCloud. It was followed by "Who Goes There" on 18 May 2016. The album was released on 25 May 2016, through Year0001. Following its release, Eklund called Eversince a "brilliant debut" (Note: This quote is a translation of the original text: "briljant debut") that sees Bladee "stepping out of Yung Lean's shadow". (Note: This quote is a translation of the original text: "kliver ur Yung Leans skugga") Price wrote that Eversince is "by far his most consistent project to date" and that "Bladee's songwriting craft is the best it's ever been". Retrospectively, many fans have declared it as Bladee's masterpiece.

== Track listing ==
All tracks are written by Benjamin Reichwald and Ludwig Rosenberg, except where noted. All tracks are produced by Whitearmor.

No.	Title	Writer(s)	Length
1.	"Who Goes There"		3:09
2.	"So What" (featuring Ecco2k)	Zak Arogundade; Reichwald; Rosenberg	3:19
3.	"Lovenote"		3:15
4.	"Missing Person"		3:19
5.	"Romeo"		2:51
6.	"Xd Out"		3:36
7.	"Sick"		3:00
8.	"Rip"		2:55
9.	"Bloodveil / Stillborn" (featuring Ecco2k)	Arogundade; Reichwald; Rosenberg	3:30
10.	"Sugar"	Jean Christophe; Reichwald; Rosenberg	3:06
11.	"Wrist Cry"	Anthony Lorenzo Homes, Jr.; Reichwald; Rosenberg	3:54
12.	"Skin"		3:35
Total length:			39:29

== Personnel ==
Credits adapted from the Year0001 website.

- Whitearmor – production
- Ripsquad – additional production
- Hitkidd – additional production
- Zak Arogundade – art direction, photography

== Release history ==
Release dates and format(s) for Eversince
Region	Date	Format(s)	Label	Edition	Ref.
Various	25 May 2016	Streaming	Year0001	Original	
Sweden	2019	CD	Year0001	Reissue	
United States	26 May 2022	LP	Year0001	Reissue	
Europe	13 October 2023	LP	Year0001	Reissue	
