= Black Kray =

American rapper and producer

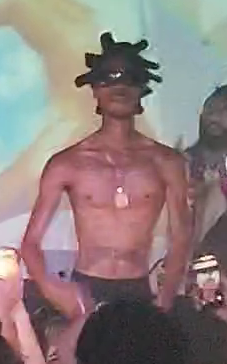
- Black Kray live in Paris, 2026.

Background information
- Also known as: Sickboyrari
- Born: Timothy O'Neal Mills; February 23, 1994 (age 32); Richmond, Virginia, U.S.
- Origin: Ashland, Virginia, U.S.
- Genres: Cloud rap; tread; trap; emo rap; witch house
- Occupations: Rapper; producer; songwriter
- Years active: 2009–present
- Label: Goth Money Records
- Member of: Goth Money Records
- Formerly of: Raider Klan; Vodeci

Timothy O'Neal Mills (born February 23, 1994), better known by his stage names Black Kray and Sickboyrari, (Note: Often stylized in all uppercase.) is an American rapper, producer, and songwriter known for his influence on the cloud rap, emo rap, and tread genres. He is a founding member of the hip-hop collective and label Goth Money Records and an early member of Raider Klan.

Mills has collaborated with many similar artists, including SpaceGhostPurrp, Working on Dying, Lil Yachty, Metro Boomin, Bladee, Yung Lean, TeamSESH, Thraxxhouse, City Morgue, Sematary, G59 Records, Chxpo, DJ Kenn, and DJ Smokey. His music has been described as melodic, hazy, and ethereal.

== Early life ==
Mills was born on February 23, 1994, in Richmond, Virginia, before moving to Ashland sometime during his childhood. He began skateboarding in 2006 which played a vital role in his development, claiming he would skate at a local skatepark "all day, every day". His father owned many CDs and DVDs, causing music and similar media to become a large part of Mills' identity.

He spent most of his youth in "the sticks" of Ashland, a place he refers to as "Elm Street" and the "Dirt Road". Alongside skateboarding, he would spend time with his family and cousins, smoking marijuana and playing video games.

Growing up, Mills was alienated by his peers and stuck to his group of similar people. He felt like an outsider to the many goth cliques in his school and faced backlash for being different than them. He described himself as "the Black version of those goth kids". He faced resistance for skateboarding and wearing skinny jeans, as doing so was still considered "white" at the time. Mills and his Black peers also faced racism and would often go out of their way to avoid certain sections of town out of fear that white people would call the police on them.

== Career ==
Mills released his first song on MySpace when he was in seventh grade.

=== 2009–2013: Beginnings and formation of Goth Money Records ===
Mills began making music "'round 2009/2010 just bullshittin' 'round on a laptop mic." He was a member of Raider Klan and their skate team around this time.

Around 2012, Mills began to form Goth Money Records alongside Karmah and Hunned Mill (a.k.a. Hunned Stackz) whom he met in school. He then met Marcy Mane (a.k.a. MFK) over YouTube when searching for trillwave beats. In 2012, Mills released multiple notable projects, including Crack Cloud$ Over Art$$ Kitchen, a project which would later be instrumental in solidifying him as a major actor in the underground rap scene.

After moving to Los Angeles, California, in 2013, he met Kane Grocerys (a.k.a. YSB OG). Luckaleannn then joined after meeting Mills over the internet. At some point, L.V.X. joined, whom he also met in school. Yung Jugg, Gothlord, and Kons were also members around 2014. As of August 2024, Goth Money Records consists of Black Kray, Hunned Mill, Kane Grocerys, and Luckaleannn.

=== 2014–2016: Collaborations with Drain Gang and Working on Dying ===
Around 2014, Mills began receiving more widespread attention. In a review of the 2014 mixtape City of Doves, the music publication Tiny Mix Tapes wrote "the tape slaps from top to bottom with tear-jerking, uzi toting emo-thug anthems".

By 2014, Mills had also met the Swedish cloud rap collective Drain Gang members Yung Lean and Bladee, as well as the producer collective Working on Dying. These collaborators would all be instrumental in the upcoming years of his career.

2014 also marked the release 700 Dagreez, featuring "Stevie J and Joseline" and a collaboration with Bladee, "7 Roses", which would both become fan favorite songs over time. The mixtape included production from Yung Sherman, Suicideyear, Cold Hart, and members of the Working on Dying collective.

Mills, through his collaborations with the Working on Dying collective and its founder F1lthy in particular, would be credited as being instrumental in the development of the Tread genre, a subgenre of trap music that became popular around the mid-2010s.

Collaborations became limited after Hippos in Tanks' founder and frequent Drain Gang collaborator Barron Machat died in a car crash on April 8, 2015. Mills nonetheless worked with Yung Lean on his 2016 album Warlord, appearing on the song "Pearl Fountain" along with Bladee. In 2017, Mills also made an appearance on Bladee's Working on Dying mixtape, produced by the collective.

=== 2016–present: Sickboyrari ===
On July 14, 2016, Mills released the Working Out da Mud mixtape, crediting himself as 'Black Kray AKA SickboyRari'. Mills explained the choice of new name came from him being "sick" and because he "stays in his lane like a rari". This new alias would mark his career from 2016 onwards. In a 2018 article, Pitchfork referred to him by his new name in an article written about new songs from up-and-coming rappers.

Mills has continued collaborating with the Working on Dying and Drain Gang collectives into the 2020s, as evidenced by his feature on the F1lthy-produced track "Otherside" from Bladee's 2024 album Cold Visions. The Fader described his verse by saying, "Rari enters late, adopting a codeine-coated delivery that allows us to imagine what Chief Keef might sound like if he was born in the south". The publication also put the song on their list of 50 best songs of 2024.

== Artistry ==
=== Musical style and influence ===
Mills has cited Lil B, Yellowman, Big Youth, Gregory Isaacs, Daringer, John Holt, Cults, Wolf Parade, Chief Keef, Lil Prada, Best Coast, Salem, Crim3s, White Ring, and the genre witch house as some of his influences.

His musical style has been described as including elements of cloud rap, witch house, trap, tread, and Southern hip-hop. Mills' group Goth Money Records has been credited with pioneering emo rap.

=== Legacy ===
Mills has been cited as an influence by notable artists such as Sematary, Xaviersobased, and Certified Trapper.

== Discography ==
=== Studio albums ===
List of studio albums
Title	Details
700 Dagreez	Released: October 17, 2014; Label: Goth Money; Format: Digital download, streaming
Thug Angel	Released: February 23, 2015; Label: Goth Money; Format: Digital download, streaming
Soulja Luv Rari World	Released: January 5, 2016; Label: Goth Money; Format: Digital download, streaming
Euro Glime	Released: June 2, 2019; Label: Goth Money; Format: Digital download, streaming
City of Crows	Released: December 8, 2022; Label: Goth Money; Format: Digital download, streaming

=== Mixtapes ===
- 4hrs 2 Mins the Mixtape All Basedfreestyles (2011)
- Ain't Shit (2011)
- Vrt Mxney n $lvt$ (2011)
- Coc4ine & Icecre4m 2048 (2012)
- $vlena Gxmez Trvphov$$E Tvpe (T X P $ E) (2012)
- I Fvkked Gvcci Hvcci && Tvylor $wift Tvpe (2012)
- Twerkn 10 Cellph0ne$ (2012)
- Trr4p4rt (2012)
- Crack Cloud$ Over Arts Kitchen (2013)
- Ice Cream & Mac 10s (2013)
- Ice Cream Still Macn (2013)
- Goth Luv (2014)
- City of Doves (2014)
- Still Struglin Still Shinnin (2015)
- Nitemare on Elm St (2016)
- Working Out da Mud (2016)
- 4000 Dagreez (2017)
- Bright (2020)
- Nokia Talk 2002 (2020)
- Chain Gang Halo World (2021)
- Ballad of a Glime (2024)
- Sahel Dreamz (2025)
- Posted Where the Scarecrows Play (2026)
- Out da Vault (2026)

=== EPs ===
- 1 Phone 10 Beepahss (2012)
- Weepn n da Trench (2017)
- Bloodrain (2018)
- Tales From the 4 (2019)
- Born in a Warzone (2023)

=== Collaborations ===
- Black Art Goon$ (2012) (with MFK)
- Back to the Witchhouse (2013) (with Jayyeah)
- Shitty Sickboy (2015) (with F1lthy)
- Black Kray x Blizzed Out (2015) (with Blizzed Out)
- Sad Boy (2016) (with Pentagrvm)
- Depressed Shooter (2018) (with FHN Mook)
- Legendary (2018) (with Pepperboy)
- Soicy Deathrow (2019) (with Lino and Chxpo)
- Bright (2020) (with Bootychaaain)
- VODECi : Dark R&B Mixtape (2021) (with SpaceGhostPurrp, 4jay, Vamp Leek, and DOMD)
- When Doves Fly (2021) (with Slitt Mook)
