= Team Rockit (musical project) =

Musical project

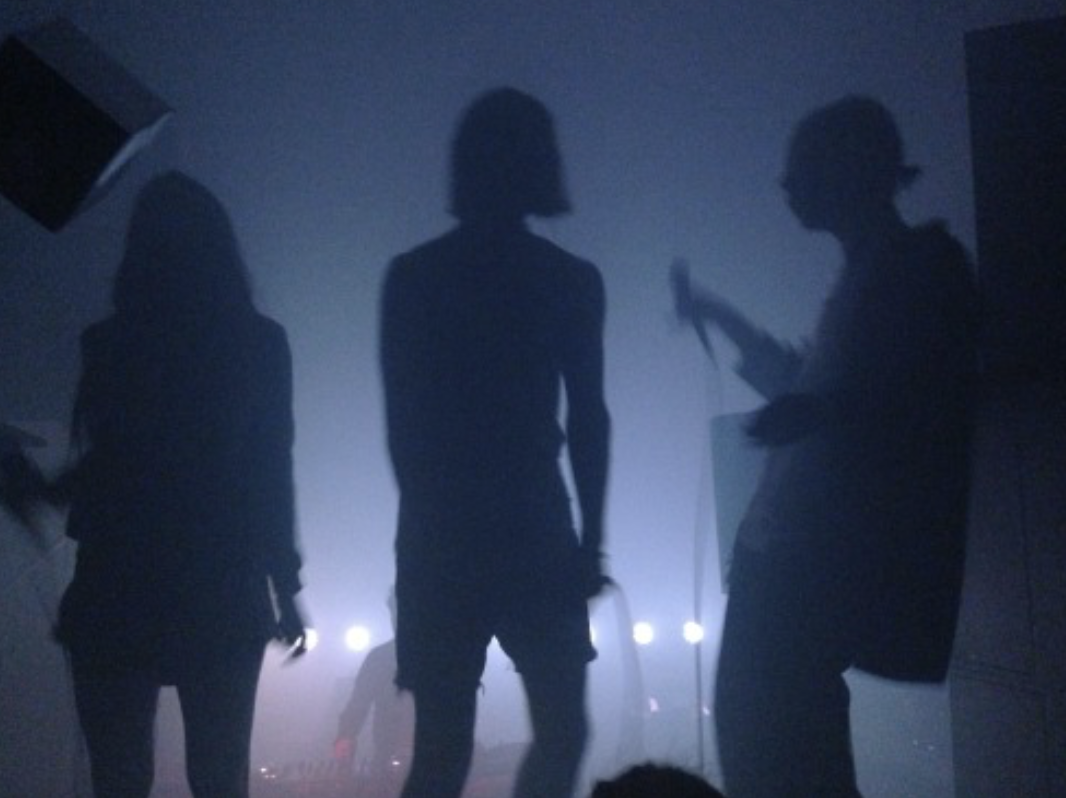
- Team Rockit live in 2013

Background information
- Origin: Sweden
- Genres: New age, trance, hip hop
- Labels: YEAR0001, Sincerely Yours
- Members: Gregorian; Merely; Ikaros

Team Rockit is a musical trio releasing music through the Gothenburg-based independent label Sincerely Yours. The band consists of the three members Gregorian, Merely and Ikaros.

The group debuted as a duo in 2011 with their album 1988. They became a trio, and released the album Anima, in 2013. In June 2017 they released their third and self titled album Team Rockit, consisting of 13 tracks, through Swedish label YEAR0001. The group released Bahamut Zero in 2021, the album was preceded by an Alternate Reality Game constructed by the three members.

== Discography ==
Singles

- "Första Hjälpen" (2011)
- "Aura" (2013)
- "Gaia" (2013)
- "Trippel Skörd" (2017)
- "Ambrosia Junkie" (2017)
- "Bombardier" (2021)
- "Jordens Salt" (2021)

Albums

- 1988 (2011)
- Anima (2013)
- Team Rockit (2017)
- Bahamut Zero (2021)

Mixtapes

- Bahamut (2012)
- Neo Bahamut (2014)
