= Ste the Beautiful Martyr 1st Attempt =

EP by Bladee
- Released: 30 April 2025
- Length: 7:47
- Label: Trash Island
- Producers: 30nickk; Eurohead; Gabriel Schuman; Lusi; Mechatok; Woesum

Bladee chronology
Cold Visions (2024)	Ste the Beautiful Martyr 1st Attempt (2025)	Sulfur Surfer (2026)

Ste the Beautiful Martyr 1st Attempt is the fifth extended play (EP) by the Swedish rapper Bladee. It was surprise-released through his Trash Island label on 30 April 2025. The EP was released alongside a music video for the track "One in a Million". The three-track EP was produced by a variety of Bladee's frequent collaborators. The EP's lyrics reference Saint George and the dragon he is said to have slain. The EP was named one of the best releases of its release week by Elaina Bernstein of Hypebeast.

== Background and release ==
In April 2024, Bladee released his seventh solo studio album, Cold Visions, to critical acclaim. In October of that year, he appeared on Charli XCX's remix album Brat and It's Completely Different but Also Still Brat. In 2025, he collaborated with James Ferraro and Microsoft to create an artificial intelligence video game and worked with Oklou on the song "Take Me by the Hand". On 30 April 2025, he surprise released the extended play (EP) Ste the Beautiful Martyr 1st Attempt through his own Trash Island label. Alongside the EP's release, the track "One in a Million" received a Hendrik Schneider-directed music video; the video is set in a graveyard and sees Bladee in slow-motion, waving a sword wrapped in a flag. "One in a Million" leaked months before the EP's release and became highly requested by fans until its official release. Bladee embarked on the Martyr World Tour, which is named after the EP, in October 2025.

== Production and composition ==
Ste the Beautiful Martyr 1st Attempt was produced by frequent collaborations of Bladee, such as Lusi, Woesum, Eurohead, 30nickk, Mechatok, and the Cold Visions co-executive producer Gabriel Schuman. The EP contains three tracks. Its opening track, "One in a Million", sees Bladee relate himself to Saint George and the dragon he is said to have slain in its lyrics. Music critic Kieran Press-Reynolds, writing for Pitchfork, viewed the reference as a reflection of Bladee's own struggle to overcome the "evil things in [his] mind". The song features a sorrowful melody with a light, shimmering quality, which presents themes of optimism. Press-Reynolds called the song's music "buoyant" and described the song's beat as "skydiving". The EP's final track, "St George the Martyr", was described by Press-Reynolds as a "more intoxicating" song than "One in a Million". He wrote that the track "showers you in fairy gurgles and tingly shivers".

== Critical reception ==
Elaina Bernstein of Hypebeast named Ste the Beautiful Martyr 1st Attempt one of the best releases of its release week. In a review of "One in a Million" for Pitchfork, Press-Reynolds described the track as "textbook Bladee".

== Track listing ==
Credits adapted from Tidal.

No.	Title	Writer(s)	Producer(s)	Length
1.	"One in a Million"	Benjamin Reichwald; Luis Cano; Arthur Nyqvist	Lusi; Woesum	2:56
2.	"Ask Jade"	Reichwald; Cano; Simon Hessman; Gabriel Schuman	Eurohead; Lusi; Schuman	2:43
3.	"St George the Martyr"	Reichwald; Cano; Hessman; Schuman; Timur Tokdemir	30nickk; Eurohead; Lusi; Mechatok; Schuman	2:08
Total length:				7:47
