= 333 (Bladee album) =

Studio album by Bladee
- Released: 16 July 2020
- Genre: Cloud rap
- Length: 37:16
- Label: Year0001
- Producers: Gud; Joakim Benon; Lusi; Mechatok; Whitearmor

Bladee chronology
Exeter (2020)	333 (2020)	Good Luck (2020)

333 is the fourth studio album by the Swedish rapper Bladee. A surprise album, it was released by Year0001 on 16 July 2020. It is Bladee's second release of 2020, following April's Exeter. It was produced by Whitearmor with contributions from a variety of record producers, including Gud and Joakim Benon. Its title is a reference to the holy number 3, which is a recurring theme in Drain Gang's music. 333 is a cloud rap album that explores themes of introspection and love, and contains upbeat instrumentals. It charted in Scotland and the United Kingdom.

== Background and composition ==
Bladee released his third studio album Exeter on 8 April 2020, to positive reviews from Pitchfork and laut.de. It contained two guest appearances from longtime collaborator Ecco2k, though 333 contains no guest appearances. 333 was executive produced by fellow Drain Gang member Whitearmor. It was also produced by Whitearmor with contributions from Gud, Joakim Benon, Lusi, and Mechatok. The album's title is a reference to the holy number 3, which is a recurring theme in Drain Gang's music.

333 was classified as cloud rap by Jordan Darville from The Fader and Anthony Fantano. Fantano said it also pulls from ambient pop and art pop. Ben Vassar of The Michigan Daily called it "hyperpop-adjacent". It explores themes of introspection and the depths of toxic love, and contains moments of melancholy that are hidden by upbeat instrumentals. The album also builds a soundscape of toxic love with a state of self-hatred. Darville wrote that "Bladee sounds simultaneously dazed and effervescent with his rambling raver flow". Fantano said the album "sounds like the next step in a stylistic shift for Bladee". The Boar's Max Gentleman described "Keys to the City" and "100s" as containing "Microsoft error noise style bass" and a "haunting delivery". He also described "Innocent of All Things" as having a catchy hook, "Reality Surf" having "druggy meditations", and the "percussive hits contrasting the emotional resignation" of "Oh Well".

== Release and reception ==
Professional ratings
Review scores
Source	Rating
The Needle Drop	6/10 (Note: Specifically, Fantano rated the album a "strong 5 to a light 6".)

333 was released as a surprise album on 16 July 2020, by Year0001. Its album cover was created by the English artist Claire Barrow. "Reality Surf" received an Animal Crossing-like music video that was directed by Bladee and animated by Nam Mac. "Only One" also received a music video. Fantano felt that the production on 333 was less experimental compared to the production on Exeter, but that 333 accomplished Bladee's core blissful sound more effectively compared to his other records. Nicolaus Li of Hypebeast thought that "Innocent of All Things", "It Girl", and "Valerie" were standout tracks. The album was released on vinyl on 1 September 2023, also through Year0001.

== Track listing ==
All tracks are written by Benjamin Reichwald (Bladee) and Ludwig Rosenberg (Whitearmor), except where noted. All tracks are produced by Whitearmor, except where noted.

No.	Title	Writer(s)	Producer(s)	Length
1.	"Wings in Motion"	Reichwald; Rosenberg; Joakim Benon		2:24
2.	"Don't Worry"			2:19
3.	"Keys to the City"			2:27
4.	"Hero of My Story 3style3"			1:59
5.	"100s"			2:27
6.	"Mean Girls"			2:27
7.	"Innocent of All Things"			2:09
8.	"Reality Surf"	Reichwald; Rosenberg; Carl-Mikael Berlander	Whitearmor; Gud	2:04
9.	"Noblest Strive"	Reichwald; Rosenberg; Timur Tokdemir	Whitearmor; Mechatok	2:15
10.	"It Girl"			2:16
11.	"Oh Well"	Reichwald; Rosenberg; Luis Cano	Whitearmor; Lusi	2:28
12.	"Valerie"			2:40
13.	"Finder"			1:44
14.	"Extasia"			2:21
15.	"Only One"	Reichwald; Rosenberg; Benon	Whitearmor; Benon	2:29
16.	"Swan Lake"			2:57
Total length:				37:26

== Personnel ==
Credits adapted from the Year0001 website.

- Whitearmor – executive production, production, mixing
- Lusi – production
- Gud – production
- Mechatok – production
- Joakim Benon – production
- Claire Barrow – cover art
- Zak Arogundade – photography

== Charts ==
Chart performance for 333
Chart (2023)	Peak position
Scottish Albums (Official Charts)	89
UK Independent Albums (Official Charts)	28

== Release history ==
Region	Date	Format(s)	Label	Edition	Ref.
Sweden	16 July 2020	Streaming	Year0001	Original	
United Kingdom; Europe; United States	1 September 2023	LP	Year0001	Reissue	
