= Bladee =

Swedish rapper (born 1994)

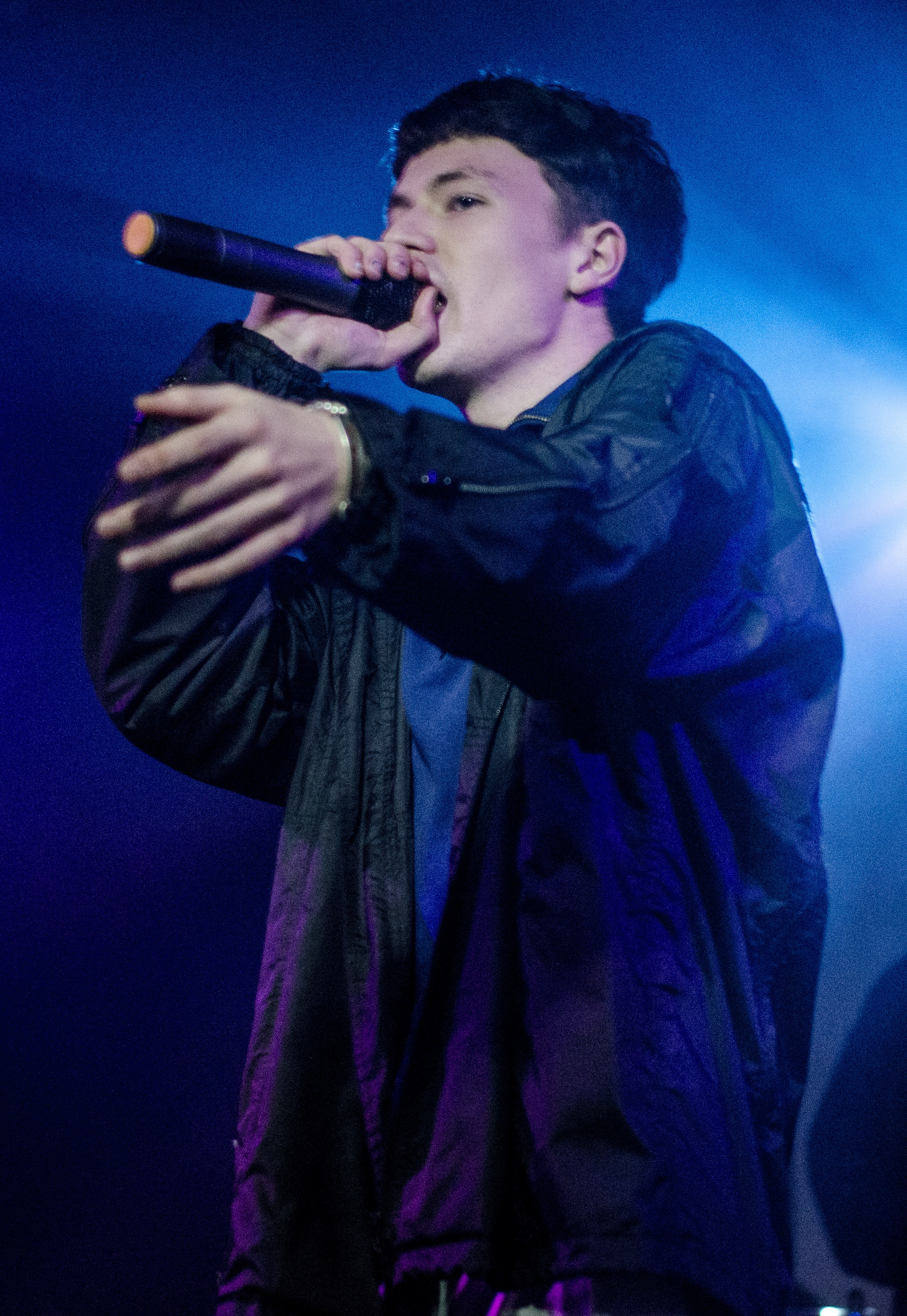
- Bladee in 2016

Background information
- Born: Benjamin Thage Dag Reichwald; 9 April 1994 (age 32); Stockholm, Sweden
- Genres: Cloud rap; experimental hip-hop; trap
- Occupations: Rapper; singer
- Years active: 2013–present
- Labels: Year0001 (former); Trash Island
- Member of: Drain Gang

Benjamin Thage Dag Reichwald (born 9 April 1994), known professionally as Bladee (pronounced "blade"), is a Swedish rapper and singer. In 2013, he formed the Drain Gang music collective alongside childhood friends Ecco2k, Thaiboy Digital, and Whitearmor. Bladee began releasing music that same year, and gained attention after collaborating with Yung Lean.

Bladee released his debut mixtape, Gluee, in 2014, and his debut album, Eversince, in 2016. In 2017 he became art director of Yung Lean's Sadboys Gear clothing line, and released Working on Dying, a collaborative mixtape with the production group of the same name. Bladee released Red Light and Icedancer in 2018.

During 2020, Bladee released three projects: Exeter, 333, and Good Luck, a collaborative album with producer Mechatok. He released his fifth studio album, The Fool, in 2021, and it met with critical praise. Later that year, he exhibited his first solo collection of paintings, Real Sprin9, and released a collection in collaboration with American-Swedish clothing brand GANT. In 2022, he released Crest, a collaborative album with Ecco2k, as well as Spiderr, his sixth solo album.

In 2023, Bladee released several singles in collaboration with Skrillex and Yung Lean. In 2024, he released Psykos, a collaborative album with Yung Lean, as well as Cold Visions. The same year, he appeared on the remix of Charli XCX's song "Rewind" and announced his departure from longtime label and management company Year0001. In 2026, he released his eighth solo album Sulfur Surfer.

== Early life ==
Benjamin Thage Dag Reichwald was born on 9 April 1994 in Stockholm, Sweden, and was raised mainly in the Skanstull area. His mother was a teacher and his father worked in restaurants. Reichwald has a younger brother named Gus, who was classmates with Yung Lean and ultimately introduced the two. As a child, Reichwald aspired to become a painter.

In 2004, he met Ecco2k. The two were classmates and formed a punk band named Krossad (Swedish for "crushed"), releasing a demo CD in 2007. Reichwald later met Swedish producer Whitearmor and rapper Thaiboy Digital through mutual friends. After leaving school, he worked at a daycare centre for about a year.

== Career ==
=== 2013–2016: Drain Gang formation and debut projects ===
Reichwald began releasing music under the stage name Bladee in 2013. Alongside Ecco2k, Thaiboy Digital, and Whitearmor, he formed the Drain Gang musical collective, at the time named Gravity Boys Shield Gang. Bladee became friends with fellow Stockholm rapper Yung Lean, forming a working relationship between his own Gravity Boys collective and Yung Lean's Sad Boys Entertainment. He was featured on the track "Heal You // Bladerunner" from Lean's Unknown Death 2002 mixtape, which gave him attention from Yung Lean's fanbase.

In 2014, Bladee released his debut mixtape Gluee. It was described as "a summertime anthem for a suburban generation stuck scrolling through Twitter". Bladee released his debut album, Eversince, on 25 May 2016. The album was produced entirely by Whitearmor.

=== 2017–2018: Working on Dying, Red Light, and Icedancer ===
In 2017, Bladee became art director of Yung Lean's Sadboys Gear clothing line. Later that year, he collaborated with production group Working on Dying on his second mixtape, named after the group. The mixtape includes features from Yung Lean and Ecco2k. A video for the track "Lordship" was later released.

After releasing the track "Decay" as a lead single, Bladee released Red Light, his second album, on 11 May 2018. It features executive production by Whitearmor, Sad Boys producer Gud, and Drain Gang member Yung Sherman. In June 2018, Bladee walked the runway at Alyx's spring/summer 2019 menswear show at Paris Fashion Week, alongside Ecco2k. His third mixtape, Icedancer, was released on 28 December 2018. The mixtape was produced by production duo Ripsquadd, and had guest appearances from Yung Lean and Thaiboy Digital.

=== 2019–2020: Exeter, 333, and Good Luck ===
In April 2020, Bladee released Exeter, a nine-song album he recorded during a week-long stay in Gotland, Sweden with Gud. The album included features from Ecco2k. A video was later released for the track "Every Moment Special". In July 2020, Bladee released 333 via Year0001. Executively produced by Whitearmor, the album contains no credited features. A video for the track "Reality Surf" was released.

After releasing tracks "All I Want", "God", and "Drama" as singles, Bladee released his third album of 2020, Good Luck. A collaborative album with Berlin producer Mechatok, it premiered on 10 December as part of an audiovisual livestream. A deluxe version was later released that included a remix of the track "Drama", featuring Charli XCX.

=== 2021–2022: Real Sprin9 exhibition, The Fool, "Amygdala", Crest, and Spiderr ===
In May 2021, Bladee released his fifth solo album, The Fool, via Year0001. The album includes a feature from Thaiboy Digital and was primarily produced by Ripsquadd producer Lusi. The Fool was well received by critics and placed 11th on The Fader's 2021 end of year list. During July and August 2021, Bladee exhibited his first solo collection of paintings, Real Sprin9, at the Residence Gallery in London. In September 2021, he released a capsule Drain Gang collection in collaboration with the American-Swedish clothing brand GANT.

In January 2022, Bladee released the single "Amygdala" in collaboration with Ecco2k and Mechatok, along with an accompanying video. On 18 March, he released Crest, a collaborative album with Ecco2k, via Year0001. Produced entirely by Whitearmor, Crest was critically acclaimed. On 8 August, Bladee released a Spring 2022 capsule collection in collaboration with Heaven by Marc Jacobs, featuring nine pieces that he illustrated and designed. In September 2022, Bladee released the lead single "Drain Story", announcing his sixth album, Spiderr. An accompanying video directed by Ecco2k was released. On 30 September, Bladee released Spiderr via Year0001.

=== 2023–present: Various collaborations, Cold Visions, and Year0001 split ===
In January 2023, Bladee appeared on the Skrillex single "Real Spring", which shares its name with Bladee's 2021 art exhibition. The next month, Bladee appeared on Skrillex's single "Ceremony" alongside Yung Lean. Music videos were released for both tracks. Bladee collaborated with fellow Swedish artist Varg²™ for their first art exhibition, Fucked for Life, held at The Hole in New York from May to June 2023. In August 2023, Yung Lean released the double-sided single "Victorious" & "Bullets" in collaboration with Bladee. Both tracks were produced by Whitearmor and released via Yung Lean's personal label World Affairs.

On 13 March 2024, Bladee and Yung Lean released Psykos, a surprise album, via World Affairs. Psykos marked their first collaborative album after over a decade of working together, and was a sonic shift for the two artists, incorporating elements of rock and post-punk as opposed to their usual pop and hip-hop soundscape. Bladee released Cold Visions, also a surprise album, via his label Trash Island on 23 April 2024. The album featured extensive production from F1lthy, with whom Bladee had previously collaborated on the mixtape Working on Dying in 2017. Cold Visions featured Yung Lean, Yung Sherman, Thaiboy Digital, and Black Kray and was well received by music critics, with it being described as Bladee's "most realized project to date" by Pitchfork.

On 11 October 2024, Bladee appeared on Charli XCX's album Brat and It's Completely Different but Also Still Brat alongside Yung Lean. He was featured on a remix of the track "Rewind", which was met with mixed reviews.

In November 2024, Bladee and other Drain Gang members announced that they were no longer affiliated with their longtime label and management company Year0001. In an interview with The Guardian, Bladee stated: "I don't really care anymore about being a bigger artist. The only thing that's important is that I'm doing something that's true to me."

Bladee released the EP Ste The Beautiful Martyr 1st Attempt on 30 April 2025. A week later on 6 May 2025, Bladee announced the Martyr World Tour via Instagram. The tour featured 10 different countries, making it the largest Bladee tour.

On 10 October 2025, Bladee appeared on PinkPantheress’ album Fancy Some More?, being featured on the track "Stateside".

Bladee released his 11th solo project Sulfur Surfer on 20 May 2026. In an interview with i-D, Reichwald shared that he originally planned to expand on the ideas of his last EP and make a full-length project called Beautiful Martyr centered around the concept of ego death, but instead felt stuck in the process. He then took inspiration from this feeling of "mid-transformation", resulting in Sulfur Surfer. The entire album was produced by Whitearmor.

== Musical style, artistry, and public image ==
Bladee is a member of Drain Gang, a group of electronic and cloud rap musicians. Although Drain Gang's music is intimate, their lyrics often reflect universal human experiences, rather than specifically their own. The members of Drain Gang are self-taught musicians.

In a 2019 interview, Bladee said the music he creates does not fit a preexisting genre. Jack Angell, a music writer for The Fader, called Bladee's sound "frostbitten futurism" and wrote that his music evokes "a wide spectrum of emotion". Nadine Smith writing for Pitchfork said that Bladee's work "introduces recognizable elements of American rap music to a new environment". In an interview with 032c, Drain Gang members described their intuitive approach to music creation, with Bladee saying he does not write lyrics ahead of time. He has cited Hilma af Klint, Chief Keef, Lil B, the Beach Boys, Basshunter, and James Ferraro as influences on his work. Pitchfork described Bladee as the "mystic oracle of Internet Rap".

Despite the members of Drain Gang not subscribing to right-wing or white supremacist ideologies, their fanbase was still significantly composed of alt-right people, especially visible during the 2016 United States presidential election. However, Bladee and Ecco2k have increasingly incorporated queer themes into their work, including their 2022 single "Amygdala". The inclusion of these themes increased the visibility of Drain Gang's LGBTQ listenership and helped nonbinary, queer, and transgender people embrace their own identities. Cassidy George of 032c wrote: "Drain Gang’s ability to articulate a strain of suffering that is specific to the internet age has bred a fandom encompassing the two most extreme poles of the contemporary political spectrum."

=== Influence ===
Bladee has been cited as an influence by artists such as Xaviersobased, Sematary, David Shawty, and Yabujin. His group Drain Gang was also credited with inspiring a style known as "draincore", which was later renamed to "digicore". Bladee has been labelled a "central reference" to digicore artists. In an interview with Pigeons and Planes, digicore artist 2hollis stated, "Everyone knows, I owe a lot to Drain Gang. Big reason I’m even doing this shit," and that "Bladee was the first dude I saw who I was like, damn, you can be a rapper as a white boy and it’s not corny."

== Personal life ==
Bladee is a private person. He has said, "I really don't like to talk about myself. I find it weird." In interviews, he has mentioned being struck by lightning during a trip to Thailand in 2019 and called the experience transformative.

Bladee's younger brother, Gus Reichwald, is a videographer who has directed, filmed, and edited multiple Drain Gang and Sad Boys videos.

== Discography ==
=== Studio albums ===
Title	Album details	Peak chart positions	
Title	Album details	SCO	UK Ind.
Eversince	Released: 25 May 2016; Label: Year0001; Format: CD, LP, digital download, streaming	—	—
Red Light	Released: 11 May 2018; Label: Year0001; Format: CD, LP, digital download, streaming	—	—
Exeter	Released: 8 April 2020; Label: Year0001; Format: LP, digital download, streaming	—	—
333	Released: 16 July 2020; Label: Year0001; Format: LP, digital download, streaming	89	28
The Fool	Released: 28 May 2021; Label: Year0001; Format: LP, digital download, streaming	—	43
Spiderr	Released: 30 September 2022; Label: Year0001; Format: LP, digital download, streaming	—	—
Cold Visions	Released: 23 April 2024; Label: Trash Island; Format: LP, digital download, streaming	—	—
Sulfur Surfer	Released: 20 May 2026; Label: Trash Island; Format: LP, digital download, streaming	—	—

=== Collaborative albums ===
- AvP (2016) (with Thaiboy Digital)
- D&G (2017) (with Ecco2k and Thaiboy Digital)
- Trash Island (2019) (with Ecco2k and Thaiboy Digital)
- Good Luck (2020) (with Mechatok)
- Crest (2022) (with Ecco2k)
- Psykos (2024) (with Yung Lean)

=== Mixtapes ===
- Gluee (2014)
- Working on Dying (2017)
- Icedancer (2018)

=== Compilation albums ===
- GTBSG Compilation (2013) (with Ecco2k and Thaiboy Digital)

=== Extended plays ===
- Rip Bladee (2016)
- Plastic Surgery (2017)
- Sunset in Silver City (2018)
- Exile (2018)
- Ste the Beautiful Martyr 1st Attempt (2025)
- Evil World (2025) (with Yung Lean)

=== Stand-alone singles ===
- "Into Dust" (2014)
- "Dragonfly" (2014)
- "Destroy Me" (2017)
- "Gotham City" (2017) (with Yung Lean)
- "Sesame Street" (2018)
- "I Chose to Be This Way" (2018) (with 16yrold)
- "Red Velvet" (2019) (with Yung Lean)
- "Trash Star" (2019)
- "All I Want" (2019) (with Mechatok)
- "Apple" (2019)
- "Vanilla Sky" (with Ecco2k) / "Birdbath" (2019)
- "Undergone" (2020) (with Ssaliva)
- "Opium Dreams" (2020) (with Yung Lean)
- "Shinie" (2021) (with Varg²™)
- "Amygdala" (2022) (with Ecco2k)
- "Real Spring" (2023) (with Skrillex)
- "Every Summer" (2023) (with Nation and Varg²™)
- "Requiem" (featuring Thaiboy Digital) / "Obsessed with Death" (2023)
- "TL;DR" (2024) (with Ecco2k and Thaiboy Digital)
- "Inferno" (2025) (with Yung Lean)
- "Ingen hör" (2025) / "Förstelnad" (2025)
- "Magic Misery" (2026)
- "Love Is A State" (2026)
- "Blondie" (2026)
