= Psykos =

Studio album by Yung Lean and Bladee
- Released: 13 March 2024
- Length: 22:16
- Label: World Affairs
- Producer: Palmistry; SilentSky

Yung Lean chronology
Stardust (2022)	Psykos (2024)	Jonatan (2025)

Bladee chronology
Spiderr (2022)	Psykos (2024)	Cold Visions (2024)

Professional ratings
Review scores
Source	Rating
laut.de	4/5 stars
The Needle Drop	5/10 (Note: Fantano gave it a "light to decent 5".)
Pitchfork	8.0/10

Psykos (English: "Psychosis") is a collaborative studio album by Swedish musicians Bladee and Yung Lean. A surprise album, it was released on 13 March 2024 through World Affairs. Recorded in Thailand and Sweden, the album was entirely produced by Palmistry and SilentSky (stylized as silent$ky). HotNewHipHop highlighted songs "Golden God" and "Enemy", while Paper highlighted "Ghosts".

== Track listing ==
All tracks are written by Jonatan Leandoer, Benjamin Reichwald, Benjamin Keating, and Lucio Westmoreland.

Psykos track listing
No.	Title	Length
1.	"Coda"	2:35
2.	"Ghosts"	3:00
3.	"Golden God"	2:16
4.	"Still"	3:37
5.	"Sold Out"	2:16
6.	"Hanging from the Bridge"	3:07
7.	"Enemy"	2:51
8.	"Things Happen"	2:34
Total length:		22:16
