= Good Luck (Bladee and Mechatok album) =

Studio album by Bladee and Mechatok
- Released: December 10, 2020
- Length: 20:48
- Label: Year0001
- Producer: Mechatok

Bladee chronology
333 (2020)	Good Luck (2020)	The Fool (2021)

Singles from Good Luck
- 1. "Drama" Released: 30 October 2020; 2. "God" Released: 24 November 2020

Good Luck is a collaborative album between Swedish musician Bladee and German producer Mechatok. It was released on 10 December 2020 through Year0001. It was preceded by singles "Drama", released on 30 October, and "God", released on 24 November, both followed by music videos. Bladee said that he wanted to do something more approachable, but still true to his expression. A remix of "Drama" by Charli XCX was released on 28 April 2021 and included on the album's deluxe edition.

== Track listing ==
All tracks are written by Benjamin Reichwald and Timur Tokdemir.

No.	Title	Length
1.	"Intro"	2:29
2.	"Rainbow"	3:28
3.	"Sun"	3:10
4.	"God"	2:25
5.	"Drama"	2:00
6.	"You"	2:02
7.	"Into One"	3:08
8.	"Grace"	2:06
Total length:		20:48

Deluxe version (bonus tracks)
No.	Title	Length
1.	"Rainbow" (Make It Double Oklou mix)	4:01
2.	"God" (Evian Christ remix)	3:26
3.	"Drama" (featuring Charli XCX)	2:01
4.	"Sun" (Toxe remix)	2:47
5.	"Grace" (Salem remix)	2:20
6.	"Gates"	4:43
Total length:		19:18

== Personnel ==
- Mechatok – production
- Gabriel Schuman – mixing
- Robin Schmidt – mastering
- Zak Arogundade – creative direction, album art
- Victor Svebderg – additional art
- Daniel Swan – album art post-processing
- Hendrik Schneider – photography
- Fredrik Andersson Andersson – photography
