= Sulfur Surfer =

Studio album by Bladee
- Released: 20 May 2026
- Genre: Cloud rap
- Length: 46:37
- Label: Trash Island
- Producer: Whitearmor

Bladee chronology
| Ste the Beautiful Martyr 1st Attempt (2025) | Sulfur Surfer (2026) |

Singles from Sulfur Surfer
- 1. "Blondie" Released: May 15, 2026

Professional ratings
Review scores
| Source | Rating |
|---|---|
| The Needle Drop | 4/10 |
| Pitchfork | 6.8/10 |
| Spectrum Culture | 70% |

Sulfur Surfer is the eighth studio album by Swedish rapper Bladee. It was self-released under his Trash Island label on 20 May 2026.

== Promotion and release ==
The album was announced on 15 May 2026, with the release of its only single, "Blondie".

== Track listing ==
All tracks are written by Benjamin Reichwald and Ludwig Rosenberg, and produced by Whitearmor, except "Fox & Birch", written with David Tibet.

Sulfur Surfer track listing
| No. | Title | Length |
|---|---|---|
| 1. | "Sulfur Surfer" | 3:27 |
| 2. | "Versailles Flow" | 3:37 |
| 3. | "Highland Tyrant" | 2:54 |
| 4. | "Dolor" | 3:07 |
| 5. | "Killswitch" | 2:42 |
| 6. | "Fox & Birch" (featuring David Tibet) | 4:15 |
| 7. | "Under My Umbrella" | 3:06 |
| 8. | "The Dark Mirror" | 4:10 |
| 9. | "Durins Bane" | 3:03 |
| 10. | "Stoner" | 3:19 |
| 11. | "Black Fire" | 3:37 |
| 12. | "Blondie" | 3:08 |
| 13. | "Scab" | 6:05 |
| Total length: | | 46:37 |
