= Mechatok =

German music producer and DJ (born 1998)

- Born: Emir Timur Tokdemir; March 24, 1998 (age 28); Munich, Germany
- Genres: Electro house; electropop; dance-pop
- Years active: 2015–present
- Label: Young
- Website: www.mechatok.com

Emir Timur Tokdemir (born 24 March 1998), better known as Mechatok, is a German music producer and DJ. He is known as a frequent collaborator with the Drain Gang music collective, releasing a collaborative album with Bladee, Good Luck, in 2020. In 2025, he released his debut solo studio album, Wide Awake.

== Early life ==
Emir Timur Tokdemir was born on 24 March 1998, in Munich, Germany. When he began to gain recognition for his music, he moved to Berlin. Tokdemir is a second-generation immigrant; his father is Turkish and his mother is Tunisian. He started playing instruments at the age of six, primarily the guitar and piano. He tried to be active in bands, and at one point, attempted to pursue a career as a semi-professional classical guitarist. When Tokdemir was 14, his father bought his family a computer with GarageBand on it, and he found that he enjoyed making music on his computer the most as it had less pressure than other fields. He has been uploading music online since he was 15.

== Career ==
Tokdemir's first project, the EDM-influenced Gulf Area EP, was released in December 2015, under Public Possession. He became a prominent member of the Stockholm-based producer/DJ collective Staycore and London-based collective Bala Club in 2016, releasing another EP, See Thru, in October, under the former. During this time, he frequently collaborated with Swedish producer Toxe and British-Chilean singer Uli K. In May 2018, Tokdemir released the EP All My Time, under the label Presto!? In 2020, Tokdemir composed the soundtrack for the video game Defective Holiday.

In 2019, Tokdemir began to collaborate with the Drain Gang collective, releasing "All I Want", a non-album single, with Bladee and producing "Security!" for Ecco2k's album E. In October 2020, Tokdemir and Bladee released the single "Drama". The duo released "God" as the second single to their collaborative album Good Luck in November 2020. The album released on 10 December 2020. The album's deluxe edition was released in May 2021 and featured remixed versions of the songs by artists including Oklou, Evian Christ, Salem, and Charli XCX.

In January 2025, Tokdemir signed with Young and released the single "Addiction." He produced the song "Makka", a collaboration between Ecco2k and Fakemink, in May. In June, he announced his debut album, Wide Awake, and released the single "Expression on Your Face" with Bladee and Ecco2k. He released the album on 8 August 2025.

== Influences and artistry ==
Dazed described Tokdemir's music as being "somewhere on a spectrum between bubblegum pop and expansive German techno." His 2025 album, Wide Awake, was described by The Face as "a dance-pop album that manages to blend nostalgic synth-pop with cutting edge hyperpop". A common motif in Tokdemir's music is melancholic euphoria, where one is so sad that accepting and embracing it gives them a sense of happiness or relief.

== Discography ==
=== Studio albums ===
Title	Details
Good Luck (with Bladee)	Released: 10 December 2020; Label: Year0001; Formats: CD, LP, digital download
Wide Awake	Released: 8 August 2025; Label: Young; Formats: CD, LP, digital download

=== Extended plays ===
Title	Details
Gulf Area EP	Released: 14 December 2015; Label: Public Possession; Formats: Digital download
See Thru	Released: 25 October 2016; Label: Staycore; Formats: Digital download
All My Time	Released: 25 May 2018; Label: Presto!?; Formats: Digital download

=== Singles ===
Title	Year	Album
"Drama"	2020	Good Luck
"God"	2020	Good Luck
"Rainbow"	2020	Good Luck
"Addiction"	2025	Wide Awake
"Virus Freestyle"	2025	Wide Awake
"Expression On Your Face" (featuring Ecco2k and Bladee)	2025	Wide Awake
"200" (featuring Tohji)	2025	Wide Awake
