= 032c =

Culture magazine published in Germany

- Summer 2010 cover
- Founder: Joerg Koch, Sandra von Mayer-Myrtenhain
- Founded: 2001
- Country: Germany
- Based in: Berlin
- Language: English
- Website: 032c.com
- ISSN: 1611-3535

032c magazine is a bi-annual, English-language contemporary culture magazine that covers art, fashion, and politics. It was founded in 2001 by Joerg Koch and Sandra von Mayer-Myrtenhain and is published in Berlin.

== History ==
The magazine was founded in Berlin in 2000 by Joerg Koch, a freelance journalist who had previously run a gallery, and his wife Sandra von Mayer-Myrtenhain, a documentary producer who created it as a way to attract attention to their website 032c.com. The original cover featured a giant red square, a reference to the bold color in the Pantone Matching System for which the publication is named. The magazine has featured names such as Kanye West and Ricardo Tisci on its cover.

== Reception ==
032c has received acclaim for its design and was awarded one of Germany's Lead Awards for National Visual Lead Magazine in 2006. The magazine's new design layout in 2007 became a hotly debated issue in the fashion and media world. 032c was awarded the German media award Lead Magazine of the Year in 2008. Its fashion editorials have been awarded Lead Mood and Fashion Photography awards in 2014 and 2015.
