= Year0001 =

Swedish independent label

- Founded: 2015
- Founder: Emilio Fagone; Oskar Ekman
- Distributor: Kobalt Music Group
- Genre: Rap, post-punk, electronic, IDM, alternative, experimental pop, contemporary R&B, ambient
- Country of origin: Sweden
- Location: Stockholm, Sweden
- Official website: year0001.com

Year0001 (stylized in all caps) is an independent record label based in Stockholm, Sweden.

== History and description ==
Founded in 2015 by Oskar Ekman and Emilio Fagone, Year0001 is an independent record label under an exclusive distribution agreement with Dutch distributor FUGA.

The label is based in Stockholm, and released music of many genres by Swedish musicians.

Sad Boys released most of their work under the YEAR0001 label, until November 2024, when Yung Lean announced that they were leaving the label.

== Artist roster ==
- Chariot
- Nadia Tehran
- Malibu
- Namasenda
- Provoker
- Team Rockit
- Anna von Hausswolff
- Nghtcrwlr
- Kite
- Yttling Jazz

=== Former artists ===
- Adamn Killa
- Bladee
- Ecco2k
- Gud
- Sad Boys
- Thaiboy Digital
- Viagra Boys
- Whitearmor
- Yung Lean
- Toxe
