= List of Swedish indie pop artists =

This is a list of Swedish indie pop artists who have either been important to the genre or have had a considerable amount of exposure (such as in the case of one that has been on a major label). This list does not include little-known local bands.

== List of notable Swedish indie pop artists ==
- Acid House Kings
- Amber Oak
- Billie the Vision and the Dancers
- bob hund
- The Cardigans
- ceo
- The Concretes
- Cinnamon
- club 8
- Badlands (Swedish musical act)
- Broder Daniel
- Dungen
- Eggstone
- El Perro del Mar
- Fever Ray
- First Aid Kit
- Friska Viljor
- Gustaf Spetz
- Jenny Wilson
- José González
- Hearts of Black Science
- Helena Josefsson
- Hello Saferide
- Hästpojken
- I'm from Barcelona
- Jonathan Johansson
- jj
- The Knife
- Komeda
- Jens Lekman
- Loney, Dear
- Love Is All
- Lykke Li
- Maia Hirasawa
- Marching Band
- Marit Bergman
- Melody Club
- Miike Snow
- Niki and the Dove
- NONONO
- Oh Laura
- Peter Bjorn & John
- Peter von Poehl
- Popsicle
- Principe Valiente
- The Radio Dept.
- Raymond & Maria
- The Royal Concept
- Sandy Mouche
- Shout Out Louds
- The Sounds
- Stina Nordenstam
- Suburban Kids with Biblical Names
- Säkert!
- Taken By Trees
- The Tallest Man on Earth
- The Tough Alliance
- Urban Cone
- The Wannadies
