= The Embassy (band) =

Swedish pop band

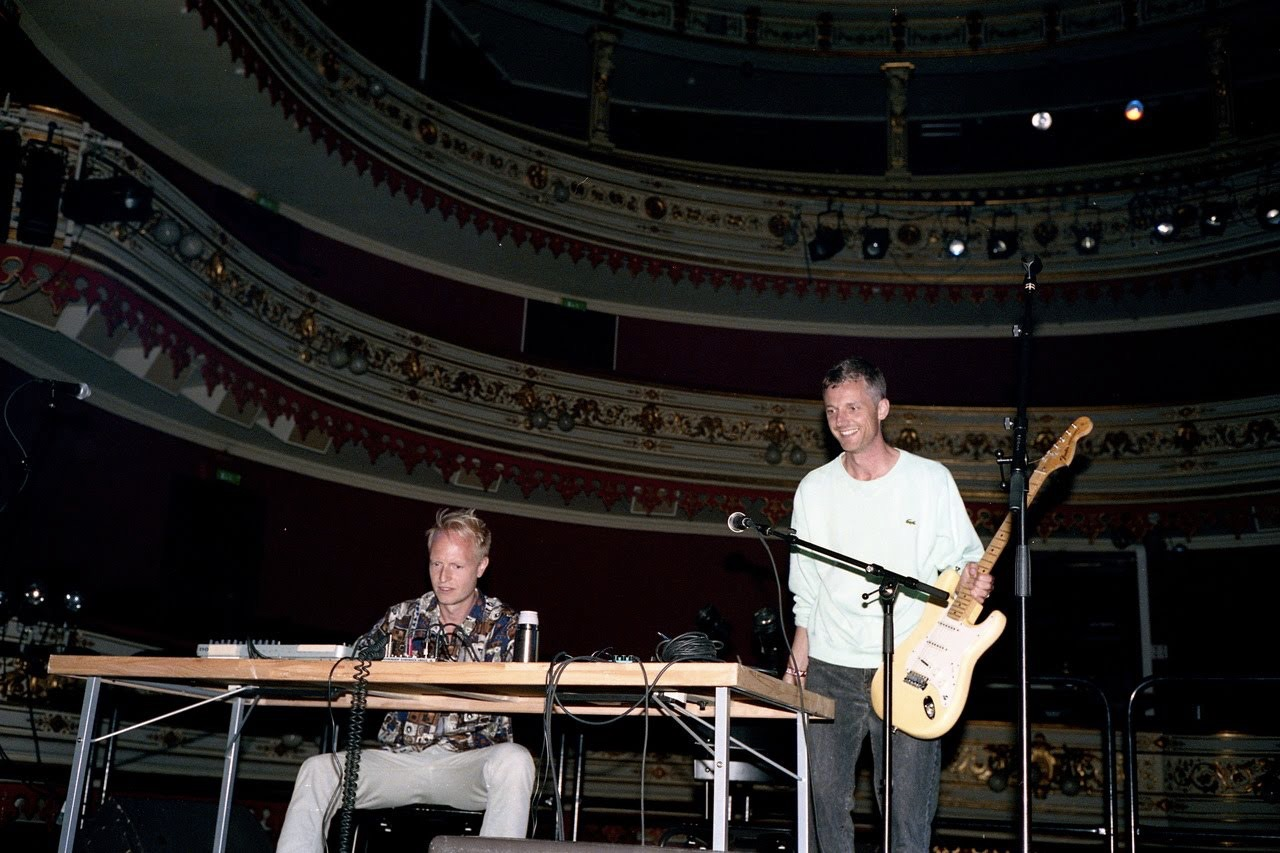
- Live performance, 2012

Background information
- Origin: Gothenburg, Sweden
- Genre: Pop・disco・house music・art pop・electronica・alternative dance
- Years active: 1999–present
- Labels: Service, International
- Members: Fredrik Lindson; Torbjörn Håkansson
- Website: Official site

The Embassy is a Swedish pop duo consisting of guitarist/vocalist Fredrik Lindson and keyboardist/programmer Torbjörn Håkansson. Their music can be described as a blend of disco, twee pop and pub rock. Their music was first released by the independent label Service but is currently released via the bands own imprint, International. The group's post-modernist attitude, anti-rock aesthetics and disrespectful live performances have made them both loved and loathed.

== History ==
=== 1999: Formation ===
"It's hard to recall but the reason we started Embassy was partly that we had the same taste in music and also because of the way we sat, with the legs twisted together like a rope. A physical bond. Our first slogan was a quote by Subway Sect - "We oppose all rock 'n' roll". So being opposed to 'rock' was clearly an issue and we defined 'rock' as stupid and conservative in contrary to 'pop' that supposed to be free and fun, a valid simplification at the time. The ambition was to connect to our readings on the musical history founded in dub, disco, post-punk and acid house and to form discussion groups on the dance floor. It all came together with the Service label, striving for a new stylish hedonism with a touch of intellectualism."

— Håkansson, on the formation of The Embassy

The Embassy was formed in Gothenburg, Sweden in 1999.

=== 2002: Futile Crimes ===
The group's debut album Futile Crimes was released in 2002, preceded by the three singles "Sneaky Feelings EP", "It Never Entered My Mind" and "The Pointer/Make me sad". The album consists of 10 songs recorded by Björn Olsson in Sehr Schöön studios. The group sparked controversy during this time for using instruments made of cardboard while performing live, along with utilizing playback.

=== 2005: Tacking ===
The second full-length album, Tacking, further exemplified the band's self-described style of "Underclass Disco" and won them critical acclaim both locally and internationally. By the end of the 2000s, echoes of the Embassy's aesthetic could be found in critically acclaimed albums by Jens Lekman, The Tough Alliance (who named their imprint, Sincerely Yours, after an Embassy song), Studio (with their Information imprint, also named after an Embassy song), Air France, and jj, among others. After the release of Tacking, the group went silent for several years. They have later stated that this was because they lost faith in the traditional album format.

=== 2011: Life in the Trenches ===
In 2011, the group released the compilation album Life in the Trenches, consisting of rarities and b-sides.

"Life in the Trenches also embodies most of the contradictions that make the Embassy so beguiling. The impression of earnest sensitivity that makes you want to pat the guys on the head often gives way to a mischievousness that leaves a not-unpleasant sensation that you're being had. […] If these guys were handing out Halloween candy, you'd check it for syringes."
- Marc Hogan, Pitchfork

=== 2013: Sweet Sensation ===
The group's third album, Sweet Sensation, was released in 2013 on the group's own label International. The album clearly showcases the group's influences of club music while still keeping their distinct sound. During their following tour, the band collaborated with the lighting artist Thomas Hämén. They had previously experimented with light by turning on the light over the audience and keeping the stage in the dark.

=== 2018: White Lake ===
In 2018, the group released the album White Lake, preceded by the EP Background Music for Action People. The release consists of 8 tracks, all of which are recorded remotely using Skype. The album is inspired by "post-punk, acid and eco-terrorism" according to the band. Following the release of White Lake, the band went on tour in Japan.

=== 2023: E-Numbers ===
E-Numbers was released in fall 2023, followed by a tour including Sweden, Denmark, France and UK. The album was released on new label Dream On (run by former Service label manager Ola Borgström). E-Numbers was recorded by Isak Eldh in Sätila, Sweden. The cover is a work of artist Klas Barbrosson. In 2024 Datasal made a remix of the whole album called "D-Numbers"

== Style and influence ==
The Embassy's blend of various underdog sub culture genres with Lindsons yearning singing and lyrics has sparked both confusion and praise. The interplay of earnestness and mischief puts the listener in a paradoxical situation of two opposing states - being thankful for a beautiful gift and getting the feeling that you are absolutely being fooled. This in turn leads to further confusion — if the listener is in fact being fooled, what are we being fooled of? In an interview, Lindson claims that frustration and euphoria are very closely related.

"Our email address has since the beginning of Gmail been "embarrassing", that address says a lot about us as a band. We connect in humiliation and turn it into a strength"
- Håkansson on the process behind White Lake

== Discography ==
=== Studio albums ===
- 2002 Futile Crimes (CD/LP - Reissue)
- 2005 Tacking (CD/LP)
- 2013 Sweet Sensation (CD/LP)
- 2018 White Lake (CD/LP)
- 2023 E-Numbers (LP)

=== Compilation albums ===
- 2011 Life in the Trenches (Album, CD/LP)

=== EPs ===
- 2004 Wearing Our Pop Art Hearts on Our Sleeves (EP, CD)
- 2006 A Compact Disc Including the Embassy (EP, CD)
- 2017 Background Music for Action People (EP, Cassette)

=== Singles ===
- 2001 "Sneaky Feelings" (Single, 7"-Vinyl)
- 2002 "It Never Entered My Mind" (Single, 7"-Vinyl)
- 2002 "The Pointer" (Single, CD)
- 2004 "Flipside of a Memory" (Single, 7"-Vinyl)
- 2005 "Some Indulgence" (Single, CD)
- 2006 "It Pays to Belong" (Single, Download)
- 2007 "Some Indulgence Rewind" (Single, CD)
- 2008 "State'08" (Single, 12" vinyl)
- 2009 "You Tend to Forget" (Single, 12" vinyl)
- 2010 "C'est La Vie" (Single, Download)
- 2012 "Roundkick" (Single, Download)
- 2013 "International" (Global mix) (Single, Download)
- 2013 "I-D" (Single, Download)
- 2018 "Wasted" (Single, Download)
- 2018 "Sorry" (Single, Download)
- 2023 "Renegades" (Single, Download)
- 2023 "Amnesia" (Single, Download)
- 2026 "Antihuman"/"Try hard" (Single, Download)
