= Jj nᵒ 3 =

jj nᵒ 3

Studio album by JJ
- Released: 9 March 2010
- Genre: Indie pop; Balearic beat; dream pop
- Length: 27:19
- Label: Sincerely Yours; Secretly Canadian
- Producer: JJ; TTA

JJ chronology
a jj 12" (2009)	jj nᵒ 3 (2010)	Kills (2010)

Professional ratings
Aggregate scores
Source	Rating
AnyDecentMusic?	6.3/10
Metacritic	71/100
Review scores
Source	Rating
AllMusic	3/5 stars
The A.V. Club	A−
The Boston Phoenix	3/4 stars
Mojo	4/5 stars
NME	7/10
Pitchfork	5.4/10
Q	4/5 stars
Spin	8/10
The Times	4/5 stars
Uncut	4/5 stars

jj nᵒ 3 is the second studio album by Swedish indie pop band JJ. It was released by Sincerely Yours and Secretly Canadian on 9 March 2010.

In April 2011, the first half of the first song from the album, "My Life", was featured in a gameplay trailer for the video game Battlefield 3.

== Release ==
jj nᵒ 3 was announced by Secretly Canadian on 24 December 2009. The album was released on 9 March 2010 in collaboration with Sincerely Yours. jj nᵒ 3 was named Rough Trade's "Album of the Month" in April 2010.

The third song on the album, "Let Go", was released on 15 January 2010 for free on the Sincerely Yours website. A music video for "Let Go" was released on February 24, 2010, on the website. The music video was directed by Marcus Söderlund and was shot in black and white. It featured both band members, a dog and close-ups of different items as they were stained with blood.

== Track listing ==
All tracks are written by JJ (Joakim Benon and Elin Kastlander), except where noted.

No.	Title	Writer(s)	Length
1.	"My Life"	JJ; Jayceon Taylor; Dwayne Carter, Jr.; Andre Lyon; Marcello Valezano; Eddie Montilla; Bryan Williams; David Delgado; Chaz Mishan	1:56
2.	"And Now"		3:02
3.	"Let Go"		3:02
4.	"Into the Light"		3:40
5.	"Light"		2:42
6.	"Voi Parlate, Io Gioco"		3:39
7.	"Golden Virginia"		3:44
8.	"You Know"		2:53
9.	"No Escapin' This"		2:41
Total length:			27:19

Vinyl edition
No.	Title	Writer(s)	Length
1.	"My Life"	JJ; Taylor; Carter; Delgado; Lyon; Mishan; Montilla; Valezano; Williams	1:56
2.	"And Now"		3:02
3.	"Let Go"		3:02
4.	"Into the Light"		3:40
5.	"Light"		2:42
6.	"Voi Parlate, Io Gioco"		3:39
7.	"Golden Virginia"		3:44
8.	"You Know"		2:53
9.	"I Know"		3:31
10.	"No Escapin' This"		2:41
Total length:			30:50
