= When I Said I Wanted to Be Your Dog =

Studio album by Jens Lekman
- Released: 7 April 2004
- Recorded: 2000–2004
- Genre: Indie pop
- Length: 45:16 (Service release); 41:17 (Secretly Canadian release)
- Label: Service; Secretly Canadian

Jens Lekman chronology
When I Said I Wanted to Be Your Dog (2004)	Oh You're So Silent Jens (2005)

Professional ratings
Review scores
Source	Rating
AllMusic	4/5 stars
The Boston Phoenix	3/4 stars
Pitchfork	7.0/10
Stylus Magazine	A
Uncut	4/5 stars
Vice	B+

When I Said I Wanted to Be Your Dog is the debut studio album by Swedish indie pop musician Jens Lekman. His first full-length, the album was released on 7 April 2004 on Service, and later in the year was also released on Secretly Canadian with a slightly altered track listing.

== Track listing ==
All tracks are written by Jens Lekman

Service release
No.	Title	Length
1.	"Tram No. 7 to Heaven"	3:06
2.	"Do You Remember the Riots?"	2:30
3.	"You Are the Light (By Which I Travel into This and That)"	3:23
4.	"If You Ever Need a Stranger (To Sing at Your Wedding)"	3:21
5.	"Maple Leaves"	3:59
6.	"Silvia"	4:56
7.	"The Cold Swedish Winter"	3:49
8.	"Julie"	2:52
9.	"Happy Birthday, Dear Friend Lisa"	3:31
10.	"Psychogirl"	5:28
11.	"When I Said I Wanted to Be Your Dog"	4:38
12.	"A Higher Power"	3:43
Total length:		45:16

Secretly Canadian release
No.	Title	Length
1.	"Tram No. 7 to Heaven"	3:06
2.	"Happy Birthday, Dear Friend Lisa"	3:31
3.	"Do You Remember the Riots?"	2:30
4.	"You Are the Light (By Which I Travel into This and That)"	3:23
5.	"If You Ever Need a Stranger (To Sing at Your Wedding)"	3:21
6.	"Silvia"	4:56
7.	"The Cold Swedish Winter"	3:49
8.	"Julie"	2:52
9.	"Psychogirl"	5:28
10.	"When I Said I Wanted to Be Your Dog"	4:38
11.	"A Higher Power"	3:43
Total length:		41:17

Sample credits

- "A Higher Power" contains samples of "So Catch Him" by Blueboy and "Words Don't Fail Me Now" by The Night Keys.

== Personnel ==
Credits for When I Said I Wanted to Be Your Dog adapted from liner notes.

- Jens Lekman – writing, performance, recording, horn arrangements

Additional personnel

- Björn Almgren – saxophone
- Emma Bates – backing vocals
- Marcus Cato – trumpet
- Lars-Erik Grimelund – drums
- Ellen Hjalmarsson – violin
- Peter Noos Johansson – trombone
- Ulrika Mild – backing vocals
- Lilian Olsson – backing vocals
- Mikaela Robsahm – cello
- Stefan Sporsén – trumpet, althorn, horn arrangements
- Jacob Stålhammar – mastering
- Johan Strömberg – recording (horns and drums)
- Ben Swanson – drums

== Charts ==
Chart (2004)	Peak position
Swedish Albums (Sverigetopplistan)	6
