= Life in the Trenches =

Compilation album by The Embassy
- Released: 27 September 2011
- Recorded: 2001–2011
- Label: Service

The Embassy chronology
Tacking (2005)	Life in the Trenches (2011)	Sweet Sensation (2013)

Professional ratings
Review scores
Source	Rating
AllMusic	4/5 stars
Pitchfork	8.0/10

Life in the Trenches is a compilation album by Swedish indie pop band The Embassy, released on 27 September 2011 by Service. The album consists of singles and non-album tracks recorded from 2001 to 2011.

The album's cover was designed by Linnea Rygaard.

== Track listing ==
All tracks are written by The Embassy, except where noted

No.	Title	Writer(s)	Length
1.	"You Tend to Forget"		4:13
2.	"Puttgarden"		3:00
3.	"Information"		3:57
4.	"Flipside of a Memory"		3:28
5.	"New Plans"		2:54
6.	"Heathrow"		1:32
7.	"Make Me Sad"	Vic Godard	3:08
8.	"St8"		3:59
9.	"No Thanks"		2:53
10.	"C'est La Vie"		2:10
11.	"E6"		4:03
12.	"I Lay Awake"		3:09
13.	"Who Put the Ass in Embassy?"		4:27

== Charts ==
Chart (2011)	Peak position
Swedish Albums (Sverigetopplistan)	36
