= Rocky Dennis in Heaven =

EP by Jens Lekman
- Released: 21 January 2004
- Length: 10:18 (Service release); 13:34 (Secretly Canadian release)
- Label: Service; Secretly Canadian
- Producer: Jens Lekman

Jens Lekman chronology
Maple Leaves (2003)	Rocky Dennis in Heaven (2004)	When I Said I Wanted to Be Your Dog (2004)

Alternative cover
- Secretly Canadian release

Professional ratings
Review scores
Source	Rating
AllMusic	3/5 stars
Pitchfork	7.0/10

Rocky Dennis in Heaven is an extended play by Swedish indie pop musician Jens Lekman. It was released on 21 January 2004 on Service. The EP was later released as simply Rocky Dennis on 6 April 2004 on Secretly Canadian. The EP's songs were written about the life and artistic biographies of Roy L. Dennis, who suffered from the extremely rare medical condition known as craniodiaphyseal dysplasia.

The Swedish release showed a sky blue cover with the words, "Someday I'll be stuffed in a museum, scaring little kids / With the inscription Carpe diem, something I never did". The songs on the EP can also be found on Lekman's 2005 release, Oh You're So Silent Jens.

== Track listing ==
All tracks are written by Jens Lekman

No.	Title	Length
1.	"Rocky Dennis' Farewell Song (To the Blind Girl)"	5:22
2.	"Rocky Dennis in Heaven"	1:02
3.	"Jens Lekman's Farewell Song to Rocky Dennis"	3:54
Total length:		10:18

Secretly Canadian release bonus track
No.	Title	Length
4.	"If You Ever Need a Stranger"	3:16
Total length:		13:34

== Charts ==
Chart (2004)	Peak position
Sweden (Sverigetopplistan)	14

== See also ==
- Rocky Dennis – a boy who suffered craniodiaphyseal dysplasia about whom the Rocky Dennis in Heaven EP was written
