= Night Falls Over Kortedala =

Studio album by Jens Lekman
- Released: 5 September 2007
- Recorded: 2004–2007
- Genre: Indie pop; baroque pop
- Length: 50:31
- Label: Service; Secretly Canadian
- Producer: Jens Lekman

Jens Lekman chronology
| Oh You're So Silent Jens (2005) | Night Falls Over Kortedala (2007) | I Know What Love Isn't (2012) |

Singles from Night Falls Over Kortedala
- 1. "Friday Night at the Drive-In Bingo" Released: 14 July 2007; 2. "Sipping on the Sweet Nectar" Released: 15 June 2008

Night Falls Over Kortedala is the second studio album by Swedish indie pop musician Jens Lekman. Described as "a collection of recordings 2004–2007" on Lekman's website and in the album's liner notes, Night Falls Over Kortedala was released in Scandinavia on the label Service on 5 September 2007 and worldwide on 9 October 2007 through Secretly Canadian.

The subject matter includes Lekman's first kiss—supposedly at age 19 ("And I Remember Every Kiss")—and being introduced as the boyfriend of his lesbian friend to her parents ("A Postcard to Nina"), as well as songs about "sublime haircuts, out-of-office replies, avocado-related mishaps and asthma inhalers", as described in a Pitchfork write-up on the album. Music journalist Andrew Harrison would coin the term "landfill indie" in a review of the album, describing Lekman's sound as an "al fresco health farm" by comparison.

== Release ==
On 25 July 2007, Night Falls Over Kortedala was announced with a release date of 5 September through Lekman's Swedish label Service. Pre-orders for the Swedish release also include a digital bonus EP, Kalendervägen 113.D, a one track acoustic medley which, according to Lekman, includes "two unreleased songs on it 'The Rain Has Got to Fall' and 'Our Last Swim in the Ocean' as well as a couple of songs from Night Falls... and a Paul Simon song from Graceland I thought was suitable. It's me, a guitar and a loop pedal, nothing else. For those of you who prefer it more au naturale."

Prior to the album's release, the song "Friday Night at the Drive-In Bingo" was released as a limited edition 7-inch single on 14 July 2007 and as a digital single on 31 July. "Sipping on the Sweet Nectar" was released as a digital single featuring remixes of the track on 15 June 2008.

== Discontinued album ==
On March 15, 2022, Jens Lekman announced that he will be discontinuing the album. The announcement gives no reason for the album's deletion, and simply states that it will no longer be available in any digital or physical formats after March 21, 2022. According to the press release from label Secretly Canadian, "Jens Lekman's Night Falls Over Kortedala is leaving this life and heading into eternity. Purchase the record, download the digital album, and stream it for the very last time by March 21st."

On March 21, Secretly Canadian hosted a final listening party on its YouTube channel at 11 a.m. ET.

On April 27, Lekman announced that he would reissue Night Falls Over Kortedala under the title The Linden Trees Are Still In Blossom, for a digital release on May 4 and a physical release on June 3. This reissue includes re-recording parts of the album that had been forced off the market due to sample clearance issues, as well as bonus tracks.

== Critical reception ==
Professional ratings
Aggregate scores
| Source | Rating |
|---|---|
| Metacritic | 80/100 |
Review scores
| Source | Rating |
| AllMusic | 4.5/5 stars |
| The A.V. Club | B |
| Blender | 4/5 stars |
| Entertainment Weekly | A |
| The Guardian | 5/5 stars |
| MSN Music (Consumer Guide) | A− |
| Pitchfork | 9.0/10 |
| Spin | 4/5 stars |
| The Times | 4/5 stars |
| Uncut | 3/5 stars |

Night Falls Over Kortedala received widespread acclaim from music critics. At Metacritic, which assigns a normalized rating out of 100 to reviews from mainstream critics, the album received an average score of 80, based on 27 reviews, which indicates "generally favorable reviews". Mark Richardson of Pitchfork felt that the album's "vinyl-crackling arrangements" and "wry, sometimes melancholic observations" make for "Lekman's best record, one likely to captivate even those who were skeptical of his previous releases". Tim Sendra of AllMusic hailed Night Falls Over Kortedala as Lekman's best album to date, calling it "witty, pretty, silly, and wise; and filled with instantly memorable melodies, thrilling moments of surprise in the arrangements, and laugh-out-loud lyrics". The Guardian's Betty Clarke praised the album as "audacious and beautiful", concluding that "pop is rarely as genuinely affecting, joyful or good as this." Robert Christgau, writing for MSN Music, said of Lekman: "Loaded with talent, heart and personality, he's an eccentric who still thinks the world is his friend, and one more sweet argument for the civilized compromises of democratic socialism."

Ryan Dombal of Blender wrote that Lekman "uses his tender touch to brilliantly tease out the bumbling awkwardness that defines modern love" and described him as "a hopeless romantic unafraid to poke fun at his own hopelessness", while Adrian Begrand of PopMatters called him "a first-rate songwriter and the best lyricist this side of Jarvis Cocker and Craig Finn". Entertainment Weekly critic Leah Grenblatt praised the album's sound as "a swirl of sparkly '60s orchestration and horns – an achievement worth a thousand days of Night." The A.V. Club's Keith Phipps was more reserved in his praise, writing that Lekman's "straight from the heart" approach is "frequently endearing and occasionally embarrassing, or sometimes both at once."

In November 2007, music journalist Andrew Harrison reviewed the album in an issue of British music magazine The Word. The review would include Harrison coining the term "landfill indie".

Night Falls Over Kortedala placed at number 23 on The Village Voice's Pazz & Jop critics' poll. Pitchfork placed it at number 153 on their list of top 200 albums of the 2000s. The album also made Paste's 50 Best Albums of the 2000s, entering the list at number 43. In 2019, the album was ranked 60th on The Guardian's 100 Best Albums of the 21st Century list.

== Track listing ==
All tracks are written by Jens Lekman.

| No. | Title | Length |
|---|---|---|
| 1. | "And I Remember Every Kiss" | 2:59 |
| 2. | "Sipping on the Sweet Nectar" | 4:11 |
| 3. | "The Opposite of Hallelujah" | 4:21 |
| 4. | "A Postcard to Nina" | 5:00 |
| 5. | "Into Eternity" | 3:44 |
| 6. | "I'm Leaving You Because I Don't Love You" | 3:48 |
| 7. | "If I Could Cry (It Would Feel Like This)" | 3:23 |
| 8. | "Your Arms Around Me" | 5:02 |
| 9. | "Shirin" | 3:56 |
| 10. | "It Was a Strange Time in My Life" | 5:08 |
| 11. | "Kanske är jag kär i dig" (English: Maybe I'm in Love with You) | 4:43 |
| 12. | "Friday Night at the Drive-In Bingo" | 4:16 |
| Total length: | | 50:31 |

Sample credits

- "And I Remember Every Kiss" contains samples of "Theme from The Sand Pebbles", written by Leslie Bricusse and Jerry Goldsmith and performed by Enoch Light.
- "Sipping on the Sweet Nectar" contains samples of "By the Time I Get to Phoenix", written by Jimmy Webb and performed by Willie Rosario, and "Dai Ndiri Shiri", performed by Patrick Mkwamba & the Four Brothers.
- "Into Eternity" contains samples of "Hambu Hodo", written and performed by Renaldo and the Loaf.
- "I'm Leaving You Because I Don't Love You" contains samples of "Take No Heroes", written and performed by The Tough Alliance.
- "It Was a Strange Time in My Life" contains samples of a home recording of Lekman as a child, recorded by Lars-Eric Lindskog.

== Personnel ==
Credits for Night Falls Over Kortedala adapted from liner notes.

- Jens Lekman – writing, performance, production, recording

Additional personnel

- Björn Almgren – saxophone
- Emma Bates – backing vocals
- Clare Canzoneri – harp
- Magnus Carlson – backing vocals
- El Perro Del Mar – backing vocals
- Stefan Fält – artwork and design
- Johan Forsman – mastering, mixing
- Markus Görsch – drums
- Lars-Erik Grimelund – drums
- Ellen Hjalmarsson – violin, strings
- Frida Hyvönen – backing vocals
- Tammy Karlsson – drums, bongos, photography
- Karin Krantz – trombone
- Michael Leonhart – backing vocals
- Kristin Lidell – trumpet, accordion
- Ulrika Mild – backing vocals
- Mikaela Robsahm – cello
- Ida Rosén – viola
- Viktor Sjöberg – handclaps
- Stefan Sporsén – brass
- Ben Swanson – handclaps
- Frida Thurfjell – saxophone
- Elsa Wikström – violin

== Charts ==
=== Weekly charts ===
| Chart (2007) | Peak position |
|---|---|
| Norwegian Albums (VG-lista) | 31 |
| Swedish Albums (Sverigetopplistan) | 1 |
| US Billboard 200 | 192 |
| US Heatseekers Albums (Billboard) | 3 |
| US Independent Albums (Billboard) | 24 |

=== Year-end charts ===
| Chart (2007) | Position |
|---|---|
| Swedish Albums (Sverigetopplistan) | 78 |
