= The New School (album) =

Studio album by The Tough Alliance
- Released: 20 April 2005
- Genre: Indie pop
- Length: 42:25
- Label: Service
- Producer: The Tough Alliance

The Tough Alliance chronology
The New School (2005)	Escaping Your Ambitions (2006)

Professional ratings
Review scores
Source	Rating
AllMusic	4/5 stars
Drowned in Sound	7/10
Pitchfork	8.5/10

The New School is the debut studio album by Swedish indie pop duo The Tough Alliance. The album was released on 20 April 2005 on the Swedish label Service.

== Track listing ==
All tracks are written by The Tough Alliance (Eric Berglund and Henning Fürst)

No.	Title	Length
1.	"Tough II"	2:13
2.	"The New School"	3:51
3.	"In the Kitchen"	4:21
4.	"My Hood"	4:02
5.	"Koka-Kola Veins"	4:04
6.	"Babylon"	6:03
7.	"Keep It Pure"	3:40
8.	"Forever Utd."	4:39
9.	"Take No Heroes"	3:43
10.	"I'll Be Right There"	4:04
11.	"Sirens Outro"	1:45
Total length:		42:25

== Charts ==
Chart (2005)	Peak position
Swedish Albums (Sverigetopplistan)	14
