= V (jj album) =

Studio album by JJ
- Released: 19 August 2014
- Genre: Indie pop
- Length: 44:18
- Label: Sincerely Yours; Secretly Canadian
- Producer: JJ

JJ chronology
Kills (2010)	V (2014)

Professional ratings
Aggregate scores
Source	Rating
AnyDecentMusic?	5.4/10
Metacritic	66/100
Review scores
Source	Rating
AllMusic	3.5/5 stars
Consequence of Sound	C−
Exclaim!	7/10
MusicOMH	4.5/5 stars
NME	5/10
Pitchfork	6.7/10
Slant Magazine	3.5/5 stars
The Sydney Morning Herald	3.5/5 stars
Under the Radar	5/10
Wondering Sound	3/5 stars

V is the third studio album by Swedish indie pop band JJ. It was announced by Secretly Canadian on May 29, 2014, and was released on August 19, 2014, in collaboration with Sincerely Yours. The album was made available for streaming through NPR on August 4, two weeks before the release date.

A music video for the song "All White Everything" was released on June 11, 2014. The music video was directed by Olivia Kastebring and featured the band members inside a mental hospital.

== Track listing ==
All tracks are written by JJ (Joakim Benon and Elin Kastlander).

No.	Title	Length
1.	"V"	1:01
2.	"Dynasti"	3:15
3.	"Dean & Me"	3:55
4.	"All White Everything"	4:19
5.	"When I Need You"	4:31
6.	"Fågelsången"	3:33
7.	"Full"	4:04
8.	"Innerlight"	4:18
9.	"Hold Me"	4:17
10.	"I"	3:54
11.	"Be Here Now"	2:58
12.	"All Ways, Always"	4:13
Total length:		44:18
