= Oh You're So Silent Jens =

Compilation album by Jens Lekman
- Released: 8 June 2005
- Genre: Indie pop
- Length: 63:22
- Labels: Service; Secretly Canadian
- Producer: Jens Lekman

Jens Lekman chronology
When I Said I Wanted to Be Your Dog (2004)	Oh You're So Silent Jens (2005)	Night Falls Over Kortedala (2007)

Oh You're So Silent Jens is a compilation album by Swedish indie pop musician Jens Lekman. It was first released on Service on 8 June 2005, and later re-released on 22 November 2005 on Secretly Canadian. The album is composed of previously released tracks taken from Maple Leaves (2003), Rocky Dennis in Heaven (2004), and Julie (2004), as well as "F-Word" (2003) from a CD distributed in the fanzine En Garde and "The Wrong Hands" (2004) from the Accelerator compilation.

The album cover was designed by the Swedish musician Rasmus Hägg, one half of the duo Studio.

== Withdrawal and replacement ==
Lekman's early music was often built on sampling, to which his label Secretly Canadian initially took a casual attitude, but according to co-founder Ben Swanson, "as his profile grew, it felt more and more untenable with each release." Due to copyright claims from major labels, Lekman quietly withdrew Oh You're So Silent Jens from digital and physical circulation in 2011.

More than a decade later, on April 27, 2022, Lekman digitally released an updated version of the album titled The Cherry Trees Are Still in Blossom, with a physical release on June 3 via Secretly Canadian. This reissue includes re-recorded versions of songs that had previously used samples, as well as bonus tracks. Lekman's 2007 album Night Falls Over Kortedala was similarly replaced at the same time.

== Critical reception ==
Professional ratings
Aggregate scores
Source	Rating
Metacritic	79/100
Review scores
Source	Rating
AllMusic	4.5/5 stars
Entertainment Weekly	A−
Pitchfork	8.5/10
PopMatters	7/10
Stylus Magazine	A−
Uncut	4/5 stars
Vice	A−

Oh You're So Silent Jens received widespread acclaim from contemporary music critics. At Metacritic, which assigns a normalized rating out of 100 to reviews from mainstream critics, the album received an average score of 79, based on 13 reviews, which indicates "generally favorable reviews".

Amy Phillips of Pitchfork gave the album a very positive review, stating, "Oh You're So Silent Jens, his new collection of previously released singles and B-sides, is a marvel of pure songcraft. Clichés unravel, traditional structures break down and build back up again, unpretentious witticisms sparkle. And then there are the sonics of the thing: lo-fi Phil Spector room dividers of sound, unexpected samples, and Lekman's rich, cavernous monotone."

== Track listing ==
All tracks are written by Jens Lekman, except where noted.

No.	Title	Writer(s)	Originally from	Length
1.	"At the Dept. of Forgotten Songs"		Untitled 2003 vinyl 7"	1:32
2.	"Maple Leaves" (EP version)	Lekman; Dan Treacy	Maple Leaves EP	3:59
3.	"Sky Phenomenon"		Maple Leaves EP	4:34
4.	"Pocketful of Money"		Maple Leaves EP	4:20
5.	"Black Cab"		Maple Leaves EP	4:54
6.	"Someone to Share My Life With"	Treacy	Maple Leaves EP	3:32
7.	"Rocky Dennis' Farewell Song"		Rocky Dennis in Heaven EP	5:22
8.	"Rocky Dennis in Heaven"		Rocky Dennis in Heaven EP	1:02
9.	"Jens Lekman's Farewell Song to Rocky Dennis"		Rocky Dennis in Heaven EP	3:55
10.	"Julie" (Remix)		Julie EP	3:02
11.	"I Saw Her in the Anti War Demonstration"		Julie EP	3:11
12.	"A Sweet Summer's Night on Hammer Hill"		Julie EP	3:27
13.	"A Man Walks into a Bar"		Julie EP	4:20
14.	"Another Sweet Summer's Night on Hammer Hill"		Julie EP	3:22
15.	"F-Word"	Lekman; Malcolm Middleton; Aidan Moffat	2003 En Garde fanzine CD-R	4:36
16.	"The Wrong Hands"		Accelerator 2004 (Startracks)	4:21
17.	"Maple Leaves" (7" version)	Lekman; Treacy	Untitled 2003 vinyl 7"	3:45
Total length:				63:22

== Credited samples ==
- "Maple Leaves" (in both versions) incorporates a sample of "Someone to Share My Life With" by the Television Personalities.
- "Black Cab" incorporates a sample of "Mary Jo" by Belle & Sebastian.
- "Pocketful of Money" samples "Gravedigger Blues" by Beat Happening.
- "A Sweet Summer's Night on Hammer Hill" incorporates a sample from the bootleg "Emmaboda 2003" recorded by Patrik Lindgren.
- "F-Word" incorporates a sample of "Kate Moss" by Arab Strap.

== Personnel ==
Credits for Oh You're So Silent Jens adapted from liner notes.

- Jens Lekman – writing, performance, engineering, production, recording

Additional personnel

- Linda Andersson – violin
- Emma Bates – backing vocals
- Marcus Cato – trumpet
- Markus Görsch – drums
- Rasmus Hägg – artwork and design
- Ellen Hjalmarsson – violin
- Patrik Lindgren – engineering
- Ulrika Mild – backing vocals
- Lilian Olsson – backing vocals
- Mikaela Robsahm – cello
- Jacob Stålhammar – mastering
