= An Argument with Myself =

EP by Jens Lekman
- Released: 19 September 2011
- Recorded: 2011
- Studios: Guy Blackman and Ben O'Connor's house (Clifton Hill, Victoria); Studio Sonores (Gothenburg); Kortedala Beauty Center (Kortedala, Gothenburg); Marlborough Farms (Brooklyn, New York)
- Genre: Indie pop
- Length: 17:37
- Label: Secretly Canadian
- Producers: Jens Lekman; Henning Fürst

Jens Lekman chronology
Night Falls Over Kortedala (2007)	An Argument with Myself (2011)	I Know What Love Isn't (2012)

An Argument with Myself is an extended play by Swedish indie pop musician Jens Lekman, released on 19 September 2011 on Secretly Canadian.

== Background ==
On 19 March 2011, Lekman premiered "Waiting for Kirsten" at the Read and Shout Library Festival in London. The song makes reference to American actress Kirsten Dunst.

The EP was released by Secretly Canadian on 19 September in the United Kingdom and 20 September in the United States.

== Reception ==
Professional ratings
Aggregate scores
Source	Rating
AnyDecentMusic?	6.9/10
Metacritic	76/100
Review scores
Source	Rating
AllMusic	3/5 stars
The A.V. Club	B
Consequence of Sound	4/5 stars
Drowned in Sound	7/10
MSN Music (Expert Witness)	A
MusicOMH	3/5 stars
Paste	7.0/10
Pitchfork	7.9/10
PopMatters	8/10

An Argument with Myself received generally positive reviews from critics. At Metacritic, which assigns a weighted mean rating out of 100 to reviews from mainstream publications, the album received an average score of 76, based on 12 reviews, which indicates "generally favorable reviews". Erik Adams of The A.V. Club praised Lekman's songwriting as "so detailed and so personal". Zachary Houle of PopMatters called Lekman "one of the most dependable and vital songwriters at work today" and stated, "this extended play sees Lekman reaching a transitional state in his songwriting, looking back to past totems used in his work but also looking forward to a new form of expressionism in his songwriting." Jason Ferguson of Paste called the EP "a pleasantly jumbled affair that shows Lekman’s lyrical facility continues to improve, while his stylistic palette continues to broaden", commenting that "he has moved well beyond the simple, twee clone-work of his earliest releases."

Pitchfork's Brian Howe called the EP "a compact gem" and stated, "It tilts this way and that to show different facets of the singer: his ruminative side, his topical side, his devotional side, his wicked humor, skewed insight, and flawless banality. At less than 18 minutes, there isn't a wasted moment. Each song does something distinct both sonically and lyrically, filtering one rarified [sic] but relatable sensibility through guise after revealing guise." Consequence of Sound writer Austin Trunick stated, "Full of the poppy arrangements that characterized his last album, there’s enough of Lekman’s trademark wit and self-deprecation on display in this 17-minute set to remind listeners of his status as one indie music’s best storytellers." Robert Christgau wrote in MSN Music, "The first three songs on this EP are strong, the fourth misty, the fifth sweet and slight, but all know melody and all fill out a portrait of a young man your daughter should only bring home to mother."

AllMusic editor Tim Sendra commented that the songs are "a bit too sophisticated, as it’s the first time Lekman's records have sounded played by professionals instead of pieced together with samples or stumbled through by friends, and inspired instead of painstakingly crafted. It gives the songs a sheen of studio gloss they don’t need at all and distracts from Lekman’s innate humanity and the intimacy he so easily transmits most of the time." Gareth Ware of MusicOMH viewed that "musically [...] parts of the EP leave a lot to be desired," although he commented that "Lekman's ability as a raconteur extraordinaire remains undimmed." Drowned in Sound's Sam Kinchin-Smith noted "no one big overarching idea, no head-explodingly poptastic lead single" in comparison to Lekman's previous EPs, but commended him for "mak[ing] songs out of fragments rather than sweeping panoramas: of other people’s songs, of dialogue, of stories from his own life, of stories from others'."

== Track listing ==
All tracks are written by Jens Lekman, except where noted.

No.	Title	Writer(s)	Length
1.	"An Argument with Myself"		3:45
2.	"Waiting for Kirsten"		3:44
3.	"A Promise"		4:31
4.	"New Directions"		2:38
5.	"So This Guy at My Office"	Lekman; Bill Wells	2:59
Total length:			17:37

Sample credits

- "An Argument with Myself" contains samples of "It's So Different Here" by Rachel Sweet.
- "So This Guy at My Office" is partly based on the melody "Half Seas Over" by Bill Wells.

== Personnel ==
Credits for An Argument with Myself adapted from liner notes.

- Jens Lekman – composition, production, engineering, recording

Additional personnel

- Perniclas Bedow – artwork
- Henning Fürst – production, recording, drum programming
- Paul Gold – mastering
- Charlie Hall – drums
- Marla Hansen – violin
- Jamie Hill – mix engineer
- Ellen Hjalmarsson – violin
- Axel Hugmark – illustration
- Michael Leonhart – trumpet
- Kristin Lidell – trumpet
- Ulrika Mild – vocals, flute
- Evelyn Morris – accordion
- Julia Rydholm – bass
- Raquel Solier – drums
- Frida Thurfjell – saxophone

== Charts ==
Chart (2011)	Peak position
US Heatseekers Albums (Billboard)	7
US Independent Albums (Billboard)	47
