= The Opposite of Hallelujah =

The Opposite of Hallelujah may refer to:

- The Opposite of Hallelujah (EP), a 2005 EP by Jens Lekman
- The Opposite of Hallelujah (Defiance), an episode of the American science fiction series Defiance
