= A New Chance =

Studio album by The Tough Alliance
- Released: 21 May 2007
- Genre: Synth-pop; Balearic beat
- Length: 32:31
- Label: Sincerely Yours; Summer Lovers; Modular
- Producer: The Tough Alliance

The Tough Alliance chronology
Escaping Your Ambitions (2006)	A New Chance (2007)

Singles from A New Chance
- 1. "First Class Riot" Released: 2 May 2007; 2. "Neo Violence" Released: March 2008

A New Chance is the third and final studio album by Swedish indie pop duo The Tough Alliance. The album was released on 21 May 2007 by Sincerely Yours. It was issued outside of Sweden by Summer Lovers Unlimited and Modular Recordings.

== Release ==
Originally, the album opened and closed with a sample of the first verse of Ibrahim, the 14th surah of the Quran, recited by Abdul Basit 'Abd us-Samad. However, a group of Muslims visited TTA’s Henning Fürst and argued that the usage was very offensive. Since that discussion, the first verse has been removed along with the Arabic imagery on the front cover. On the succeeding copies of the album, the cover has been replaced with a barcode.

== Reception ==
Professional ratings
Review scores
Source	Rating
AllMusic	4.5/5 stars
Pitchfork	8.6/10
PopMatters	8/10
Spin	4/5 stars

Online music magazine Pitchfork placed A New Chance at number 149 on its list of top 200 albums of the 2000s.

== Track listing ==
All tracks are written by The Tough Alliance (Eric Berglund and Henning Fürst).

No.	Title	Length
1.	"Something Special"	4:14
2.	"Miami"	4:13
3.	"First Class Riot"	3:25
4.	"A New Chance"	4:34
5.	"The Last Dance"	4:15
6.	"Looking for Gold"	3:36
7.	"Neo Violence"	4:11
8.	"1981"	4:03
Total length:		32:31

== Charts ==
Chart (2007)	Peak position
Swedish Albums (Sverigetopplistan)	13
