= Snart skiner Poseidon =

"Snart skiner poseidon"

Single by Joel Alme
- Released: 7 April 2009 (CD single); 6 December 2011 (digital download)
- Genre: Indie pop
- Length: 2:59
- Label: Musicbase/IFK Göteborg Promotion AB
- Songwriter: Joel Alme
- Producer: Joel Alme

"Snart skiner Poseidon" is a song by Joel Alme released in 2009, as the official anthem of Swedish football club IFK Göteborg. The song has been the club's entrance music since 2009, having replaced the previous anthem "Heja Blåvitt". The song is a remake of "A Young Summer's Youth", off Alme's debut album, but with new lyrics. The melody had also previously been used in the song "Utan personlig insats" by Hästpojken, a band Alme was a member of between 2007 and 2008.

== Background ==
Before the start of the 2009 IFK Göteborg season, a debate among IFK supporters had started regarding a possible replacement of the then current anthem "Heja Blåvitt". Many different existing songs were proposed, from artists such as Maia Hirasawa, Nationalteatern and Troublemakers, until "Snart skiner Poseidon" was written by Joel Alme and posted on YouTube in mid-March 2009. His friend, bandmate (from Hästpojken), and fellow IFK Göteborg supporter Pontus Tenggren had suggested he should write a new IFK song.

Alme wrote the lyrics on a train home from Stockholm when he sat beside a woman crying as her husband had recently died. This inspired him to create a melancholic football anthem with more human character than the usual heroic and patriotic sports songs, stating in interviews that he "wanted to replace the clenched fist and testosterone with romance" and "at all costs [wanted to] avoid the feeling of Norwegian disco when it gets heroic, plastic and jaunty like that".

The song name was proposed on the internet forum of Supporterklubben Änglarna, and the supporters' association and IFK Göteborg soon decided to accept "Snart skiner Poseidon" as the new anthem. "Heja Blåvitt", the old anthem written in 1976, was replaced but lives on as the goal jingle of the club. Joel Alme performed the song live before IFK Göteborg's first match on the new Gamla Ullevi stadium on 11 April 2009.

== Release ==
The song was released as a CD single on 7 April 2009, as digital download on iTunes on 6 December 2011 and on Spotify on 28 December 2011.

== Reception ==
"Snart skiner Poseidon" reached number one position on the iTunes singles list after the digital release in late 2011, and the YouTube video had reached over one million views in June 2011, averaging more than 1,000 views per day since the original release.

Sports journalist Erik Niva from Aftonbladet gave it a shared second place with a 4 out of 5 score in his ranking of the best Allsvenskan anthems at the start of the 2009 season, stating that writing a football anthem on command is difficult, but that Alme had "understood what this is about". Another journalist at Aftonbladet, music critic Markus Larsson, called it the by far best Allsvenskan anthem in 2012, writing that even people with no interest in sports would get chills from the song, and compared it to You'll Never Walk Alone. Musicologist Patrik Sandgren judged all Allsvenskan anthems in 2016, commenting that "Snart skiner Poseidon" is a somewhat awkward Håkan Hellström knock-off, while still rating it 4 out of 5, translating to a shared first place.
