= Sweet Sensation =

Sweet Sensation may refer to:

- Sweet Sensation (band), British soul group
- Sweet Sensation (group), American female dance trio
- Sweet Sensation (The Embassy album), 2013
- Sweet Sensation (Stephanie Mills album) or the title song, 1980
- Sweet Sensation, three albums by the Melodians, 1976, 1980, 2003
- "Sweet Sensation", a song produced by Leslie Kong for the Melodians
- "Sweet Sensation", a 2018 song by Flo Rida
- "Sweet Sensation", a 1991 song by Shades of Rhythm
