= Air France (disambiguation) =

Air France is the French national airline based in Paris.

Air France may also refer to:

- Air France–KLM, the parent company of Air France and KLM, sometimes abbreviated as Air France
- Air France (band), a Swedish indie pop band
- Basketball player Mickaël Piétrus, nicknamed "Air France"
