= No Way Down =

EP by Air France
- Released: 26 June 2008
- Genre: Balearic beat
- Length: 22:44
- Label: Sincerely Yours

Air France chronology
On Trade Winds (2006)	No Way Down (2008)

No Way Down is the second and final extended play by Swedish indie pop duo Air France. It was released on 26 June 2008 by Sincerely Yours.

== Reception ==
Professional ratings
Aggregate scores
Source	Rating
Metacritic	76/100
Review scores
Source	Rating
AllMusic	4/5 stars
Mojo	3/5 stars
MusicOMH	4/5 stars
NME	6/10
Pitchfork	8.6/10
Q	3/5 stars
Spin	4/5 stars
Uncut	4/5 stars

No Way Down was met with generally positive reviews from critics. The online music magazine Pitchfork placed No Way Down at number 14 on its list of the top 50 albums of 2008 and at number 161 on its list of the top 200 albums of the 2000s.

== Track listing ==
All tracks are written by Joel Karlsson and Henrik Markstedt.

No.	Title	Length
1.	"Maundy Thursday"	2:50
2.	"June Evenings"	4:01
3.	"Collapsing at Your Doorstep"	4:34
4.	"No Excuses"	4:02
5.	"No Way Down"	4:04
6.	"Windmill Wedding"	3:13
Total length:		22:44

== Personnel ==
Credits for No Way Down adapted from album liner notes.

Air France

- Joel Karlsson
- Henrik Markstedt

Additional personnel

- Philip Granqvist – mastering
- Teresa Jaksetič – vocals on "June Evenings", "Collapsing at Your Doorstep" and "No Way Down"
- Elisabet Sjögren – vocals on "June Evenings"
- Kristian Spång – bass
