= Joel Alme =

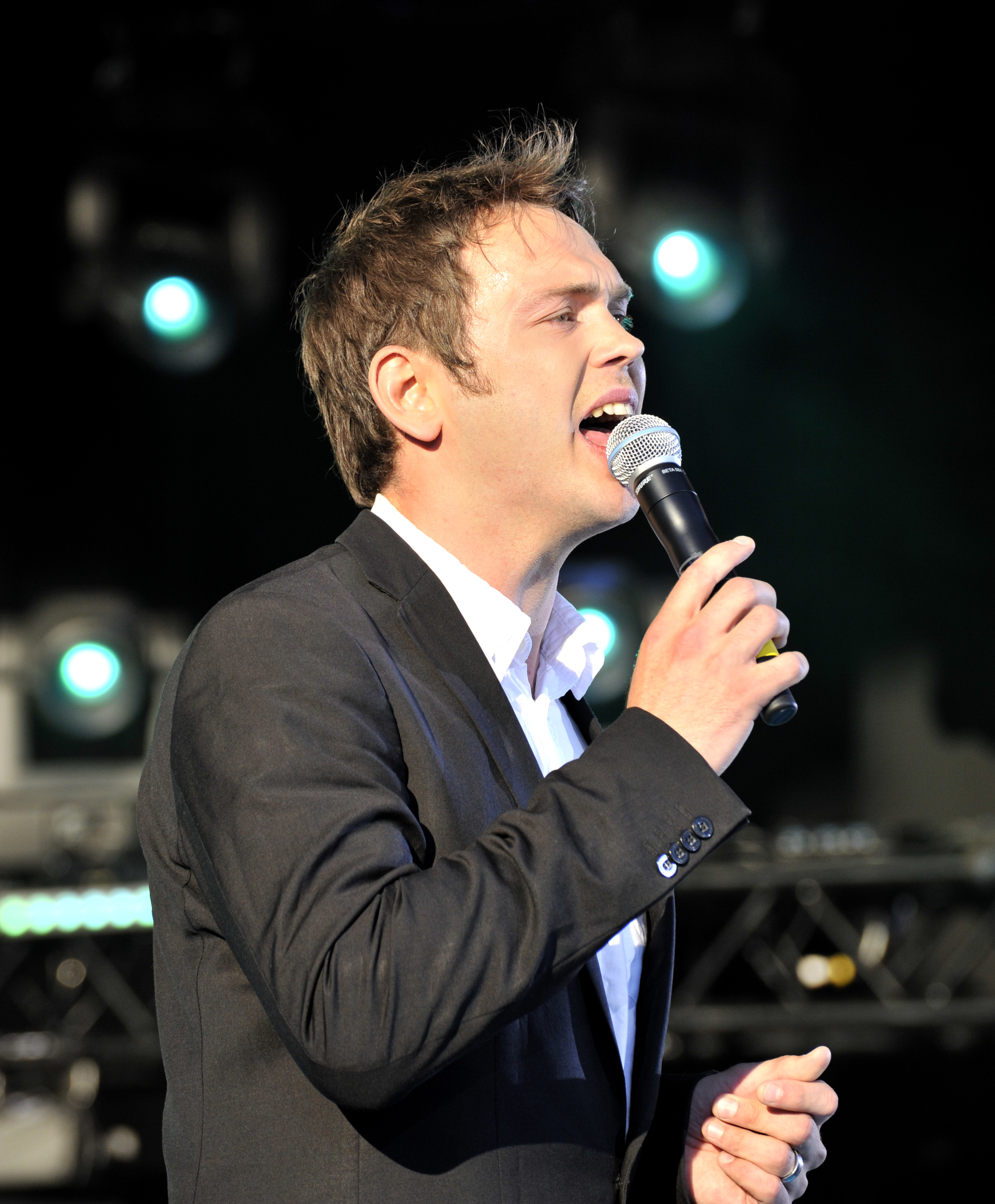
- Joel Alme performs in the solo program "Lotta på Liseberg" together with Velvet, Linda Bengtzing and Robert Wells

Background information
- Born: Joel Alme; 1980 (age 45–46)
- Origin: Gothenburg, Sweden
- Genres: Indie pop
- Occupations: Singer, songwriter
- Labels: Sincerely Yours; Razzia Records
- Member of: Spring in Paris
- Formerly of: Hästpojken
- Website: Joel Alme MySpace Profile

Joel Alme (born 1980) is a musician and artist from Gothenburg, Sweden. Alme released his debut album A Master of Ceremonies on 22 April 2008 with "Queen's Corner" being the single. In 2010 he released his second studio album, called Waiting for the Bells. He is the former lead singer for Spring in Paris.

He grew up in Gothenburg and attended Schillerska gymnasiet.

When Alme received grant money from the Swedish Arts Council (Kulturrådet) for his second album Waiting for the Bells. Regarding the grant money, Alme stated that "it enabled me to use a real strings orchestra and I could spend more time in a very good studio with a good producer, Mattias Glavå."

In 2009, Alme altered the lyrics to his song "A Young Summer's Youth" and produced the song "Snart skiner Poseidon" to be played before and after all IFK Göteborg's home matches where it is performed by a massed chorus of supporters.

In 2014, four songs from Waiting for the Bells were used in the film Happy Christmas. In the movie, Anna Kendrick's character falls in love with Alme's music. In using the music, director Joe Swanberg said of Alme, "Nothing has sounded like that since Bob Dylan."

In 2015, Alme released Flyktligan – his first album in Swedish. Most of the songs on that album are about his background and upbringing.

== Discography ==
=== Albums ===
Year	Album	Peak positions	Certification
Year	Album	SWE	Certification
2008	A Master of Ceremonies	28	
2010	Waiting for the Bells	13	
2012	A Tender Trap	16	
2015	Flyktligan	12	
2019	Bort Bort Bort	8	
2022	Sköt er själva så sköter jag inte mitt	26	
2026	Gullmar Gospel	20	
