= Yumi Zouma =

New Zealand alternative pop band

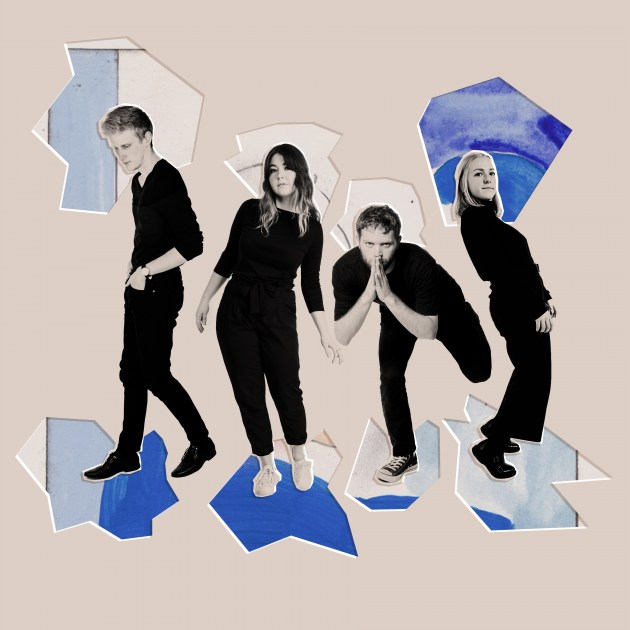

Background information
- Origin: Christchurch, Canterbury, New Zealand
- Genres: Alternative pop; dream pop; electronic; indie pop
- Years active: 2014–present
- Labels: Polyvinyl; Inertia Music; Cascine; Rallye
- Members: Christie Simpson; Olivia Campion; Charlie Ryder; Josh Burgess
- Past members: Sam Perry; Kim Pflaum
- Website: yumizouma.com

Yumi Zouma (/ˈjuːmi ˈzuːmə/ YOO-mee ZOO-mə) are a New Zealand alternative pop band from Christchurch. The band consists of Christie Simpson (vocals, keyboards), Josh Burgess (guitar, bass guitar, vocals, keyboards), Charlie Ryder (guitar, bass guitar, keyboards), and Olivia Campion (drums). The band's name is an amalgamation of the two friends who encouraged the group to start writing together.

The group's origins trace back to their history of playing concerts together in Christchurch. However, the band did not begin writing music together until multiple members moved abroad and began collaborating over email following the events of the Christchurch earthquake. This early material gained attention within the musical blogosphere and encouraged American label Cascine to sign the band before they had played live or held a band practice.

Between 2014 and 2015, the group released two extended plays (EP I, EP II). The band's debut album Yoncalla was released in 2016, including the singles "Keep It Close To Me" and "Barricade (Matter Of Fact)". In 2017, the band released their second album, Willowbank, and the singles "December", "Depths (Pt. I)", and "Half Hour". EP III was released in 2018, including the singles "In Camera" and "Crush (It's Late Just Stay)". In 2020, the band signed to labels Polyvinyl Record Co. and Inertia Music, and released their third album Truth or Consequences, which featured the singles "Right Track / Wrong Man", "Cool For A Second", "Southwark", "Lonely After", and "Sage".

== Career ==
=== Early career: EP I and EP II (2014–2015) ===
Founded by Burgess, Ryder, and vocalist Kim Pflaum, the group began writing music using file sharing services when Burgess left New Zealand to work at New York-based record label Captured Tracks. The band's first release, EP I, debuted in early 2014, after the single A Long Walk Home For Parted Lovers appeared on several blogs before being quickly taken down. The band were positively reviewed by Pitchfork and profiled by The Guardian, leading to the group signing with Brooklyn-based record label Cascine. In mid-2014, the band began playing live, touring with singer Lorde, and collaborating with other acts, such as Swedish band Air France. Guitarist Sam Perry and vocalist Christie Simpson joined the group in 2015, while Pflaum left and started the solo project Madeira (later renamed Laumė). The band released a second EP, EP II, in early 2015, and proceeded to tour extensively throughout Europe, Asia, and North America, with the likes of Jamie xx and Lower Dens.

=== Yoncalla (2016) ===
The band quickly released their first full-length album, Yoncalla, the following year. As opposed to the long-distance writing of the band's earlier releases, Yoncalla consisted of material that had been finished during tours for EP II. The majority of the album's final material was recorded in Paris, France, following an American tour which stopped by the city of Yoncalla, Oregon. The band produced the album at electronic musician Philippe Zdar's Motorbass studio in Paris, enabling them to achieve a sound more akin to classic synth-pop than their previous records.

=== Willowbank (2017) ===
After a year of heavy touring in support of Yoncalla, the band travelled home to record in New Zealand for the first time. A limited edition cover of the Oasis album (What's The Story) Morning Glory? was distributed on vinyl in early 2017, before the release of the band's second album, Willowbank, in October. The sessions for Willowbank marked the first time that the group had worked together in a professional studio, with the band initially questioning whether they should "all move into separate rooms" to recreate the remote song writing process from previous records. However, the sessions allowed for stronger collaboration and more organic instrumentation compared to earlier material, leading to jazz musician Olivia Campion joining the band as a live drummer. Lead single Depths (Pt. I) became a success on streaming platforms, and was accompanied by a video created by illustrator Frances Haszard. Following the completion of touring for Willowbank, Perry left the band in order to concentrate on his Serbia-based musical project DOG Power.

=== EP III (2018) ===
In wake of the departure of Perry, the remaining four members of the band proceeded to return to the methods of long-distance writing that had inspired their earlier material. This process led to the creation of a third EP, released in October 2018. A video for lead single In Camera was released in early 2019, directed by Pavel Brenner. A video for second single Crush (It's Late, Just Stay) was also released in 2019, directed by Robbie Barnett.

=== Truth or Consequences (2020) ===
After signing to Polyvinyl and Inertia Records, Yumi Zouma released their third studio album Truth or Consequences on 13 March 2020. The album features the singles "Right Track / Wrong Man", "Cool For A Second", "Southwark", "Lonely After", and "Sage".Truth or Consequences, by Yumi Zouma Along with the album, Yumi Zouma is set to release a unique line of merchandise which includes a candle, bandana, and enamel pin. The band announced a reimagined edition of the album named Truth or Consequences - Alternate Versions, which was released in October 2020.

=== Present Tense (2022) ===
Release Date: 18 Mar 2022. The fourth full-length release was recorded remotely with some in-studio sessions in Los Angeles, London, Florence, New York and New Zealand due to the COVID-19 pandemic.

=== No Love Lost to Kindness (2026) ===
Released on 30 January 2026. According to a review in The Guardian, the band claims their fifth album left behind their previous Dream pop style for a harder edged approach with 'harder guitars and bolder intentions'. Via a press release the band said: "For us, the album is one where we made a deliberate effort to shed the soft-focus production of [our] old [sound] in favor of a heavier and more emotionally exposed feel".

== Band members ==
=== Current ===
- Christie Simpson – lead vocals, samplers, keyboards (2015–present)
- Josh Burgess - vocals, guitar, bass guitar, keyboards, synthesizers, drum programming, samplers (2014–present)
- Charlie Ryder - guitar, bass guitar, keyboards, synthesizers, drum programming, samplers (2014–present)
- Olivia Campion - drums (2017–present)

=== Previous ===
- Sam Perry - vocals, guitar, bass guitar, keyboards, synthesizers, drum programming, samplers (2015–2018)
- Kim Pflaum – vocals, guitar, samplers (2014–2015)

== Musical equipment ==
=== Live concert equipment ===
- Fender Telecaster guitars
- Fender Bronco bass guitar
- Waldorf Blofeld sampling synthesizer
- Roland SP-404 samplers
- Neunaber Wet Reverb guitar pedals
- Malekko Analog Chorus guitar pedals
- Roland Jazz Chorus guitar amplifiers

=== Studio recording equipment ===
For studio recordings, the band use their live equipment, a Sequential Prophet 600 synthesizer, and an Apogee Electronics Duet recording interface.

== Discography ==
=== Studio albums ===
Title	Details
Yoncalla	Released: 27 May 2016; Label: Cascine/Arch Hill
Willowbank	Released: 6 October 2017; Label: Cascine
Truth or Consequences	Released: 13 March 2020; Label: Polyvinyl/Pod/Inertia
Present Tense	Released: 18 March 2022; Label: Polyvinyl/PIAS
No Love Lost to Kindness	Released: 30 January 2026; Label: Nettwerk

=== Extended plays ===
Title	Details
EP	Released: February 2014; Label: Cascine
EP II	Released: March 2015; Label: Cascine
EP III	Released: September 2018; Label: Cascine
EP IV	Released: December 2023; Label: Yumi Zouma

=== Singles ===
- "A Long Walk Home for Parted Lovers" (2013)
- "The Brae" (2014)
- "It Feels Good to Be Around You" (featuring Air France) (2014)
- "Alena" (2014)
- "Catastrophe" (2015)
- "Song for Zoe & Gwen" (2015)
- "Right, Off the Bridge" (2015)
- "Keep It Close to Me" (2016)
- "Barricade (Matter of Fact)" (2016)
- "Short Truth" (2016)
- "December" (2017)
- "Depths (Pt. I)" (2017)
- "Persephone" (2017)
- "Half Hour" (2017)
- "France (Grands Boulevards)" (2018)
- "In Camera" (2018)
- "Crush (It's Late, Just Stay)" (2018)
- "Bruise" (2019)
- "Right Track / Wrong Man" (2019)
- "Cool for a Second" (2020)
- "Lonely After" (2020)
- "Southwark" (2020)
- "Sage" (2020)
- "Give It Hell" (2021)
- "Mona Lisa" (2021)
- "In the Eyes of Our Love" (2022)
- "Where the Light Used to Lay" (2022)
- "Astral Projection" (2022)
- "KPR" (2023)
- "Be Okay" (2023)
- "Kicking Up Daisies" (2023)
- "Bashville on the Sugar" (2025)
- "Blister" (2025)
- "Cross My Heart and Hope to Die" (2025)
- "Drag" (2025)
- "Phoebe's Song" (2025)
- "95" (2025)
- "Every False Embrace" (2026)

=== Collaborations ===
- "It Feels Good to Be Around You" (featuring Air France) – Air France (2014)
- "Flirt" (featuring Yumi Zouma & Madiera) – Boycrush (2015)
- "100%" (featuring Yumi Zouma) – Boycrush (2018)

=== Remixes ===
- "Where Do You Go?" – Claire George (2018)
- "Up Again" – Chad Valley (2018)
- "Limo Song" – Jack River (2018)

=== DJ mixes ===
- Faded Arrow MIX004 (2015)
- Dissipating Summer (2017)
