= Air France (band) =

Swedish indie pop band

- Origin: Gothenburg, Sweden
- Genres: Indie pop; Balearic beat
- Years active: 2005–2012
- Labels: Sincerely Yours; Something in Construction
- Past members: Joel Karlsson; Henrik Markstedt; Elisabet Sjögren

Air France were a Swedish indie pop band formed in Gothenburg by Joel Karlsson and Henrik Markstedt. They were signed to the record label Sincerely Yours, founded by fellow Gothenburgers The Tough Alliance. Air France's music has been described as "post-rave bliss", "beach foam pop", and "Balearic disco", although Karlsson said that the Balearic movement "is something I can't relate to at all".

== History ==
=== Formation ===
Air France were formed in Gothenburg in 2005 by friends Joel Karlsson and Henrik Markstedt. The duo were influenced by dance music and acts such as Saint Etienne. The band's first track, "Behind Cabin Curtains", was lost after a hard drive crash. They were joined by Elisabet Sjögren in 2006 after the duo decided that they needed a female vocalist. The band initially stated that they would not play any live shows, although they later changed their stance.

=== On Trade Winds ===
Air France were signed by Sincerely Yours founder Eric Berglund, and in December 2006 they released their first EP On Trade Winds, which received moderate attention.

"Afraid You Told Someone About Us", a cover of a song by Au Revoir Simone, was released in April 2007, followed later that year by the single "Hold On to Me, Baby".

=== No Way Down ===
The band released their second EP No Way Down in June 2008 to favourable reviews. Pitchfork gave the EP a rating of 8.6, listing it in their Best New Music column and eventually placing it at number 14 on their list of the 50 best albums of 2008. No Way Down initially only received a Swedish release, but it was later released in the United Kingdom at the end of the year by the label Something in Construction, alongside On Trade Winds.

=== Final recordings and split ===
Air France released the single "GBG Belongs to Us" in 2009. The single was accompanied by a dedicated website, which was eventually taken down when the band forgot to pay the domain hosting fee. Later that year, it was announced that the band had signed a publishing deal with XL Recordings, aiming to release their debut album in 2010. The album never materialised as the band were not satisfied with their output. In August 2011, a new track from the band, "It Feels Good to Be Around You", was released.

In March 2012, Air France released a statement announcing that they had decided to break up. In the statement, they cited their difficulties in producing new music that they felt was "good enough" and wrote that they had "decided to stop trying, even though it breaks our hearts".

On the second anniversary of Air France's split, the New Zealand indie pop band Yumi Zouma released a cover of Air France's final single "It Feels Good to Be Around You" featuring guest vocals from Karlsson and Markstedt.

== Discography ==
EPs

- On Trade Winds (2006)
- No Way Down (2008)

Singles

- "Afraid You Told Someone About Us" (2007)
- "Hold On to Me, Baby" (2007)
- "GBG Belongs to Us" (2009)
- "It Feels Good to Be Around You" (2011)

Remixes

- Saint Etienne – "Spring" (Air France remix)
- Friendly Fires – "Skeleton Boy" (Air France remix)
- Taken by Trees – "Taken by Sweetness" (Air France remix)
