= Jj nᵒ 2 =

jj nᵒ 2

Studio album by JJ
- Released: 1 July 2009
- Genres: Indie pop; Balearic beat; dream pop
- Length: 26:44
- Labels: Sincerely Yours; Secretly Canadian
- Producer: JJ

JJ chronology
jj nᵒ 2 (2009)	a jj 12" (2009)

jj nᵒ 2 is the debut studio album by Swedish indie pop band JJ. It was released on the Swedish record label Sincerely Yours on 1 July 2009. A vinyl edition, titled jj nᵒ 2.1, was released in late December 2009.

== Reception ==
Professional ratings
Aggregate scores
Source	Rating
Metacritic	86/100
Review scores
Source	Rating
AllMusic	4/5 stars
Dagens Nyheter	4/5
Pitchfork	8.6/10
PopMatters	8/10
Slant Magazine	4/5 stars
Under the Radar	7/10

jj nᵒ 2 received a "Best New Music" designation from Pitchfork. At the end of 2009, Paste named jj nᵒ 2 "The Year's Greatest Musical Obscurity", and The Washington Post named it the second best pop album of the year, behind Maxwell's BLACKsummers'night.

jj nᵒ 2 was ranked by several publications on lists of the best albums of 2009, including at number nine by Gorilla vs. Bear, at number 35 by Pitchfork, and at number 56 by PopMatters.

== Track listing ==
All tracks are written by JJ (Joakim Benon and Elin Kastlander), except where noted.

No.	Title	Writer(s)	Length
1.	"Things Will Never Be the Same Again"		3:34
2.	"From Africa to Málaga"		2:50
3.	"Ecstasy"	JJ; Dwayne Carter, Jr.; Stephen Garrett; Darius Harrison; James Scheffer; Rex Zamor	3:33
4.	"Are You Still in Vallda?"		2:34
5.	"My Love"		3:12
6.	"Intermezzo"		2:48
7.	"My Hopes & Dreams"		2:43
8.	"Masterplan"		2:48
9.	"Me & Dean"		2:42
Total length:			26:44

Vinyl edition
No.	Title	Writer(s)	Length
1.	"Things Will Never Be the Same Again"		3:34
2.	"From Africa to Málaga"		2:50
3.	"Ecstasy"	JJ; Carter; Garrett; Harrison; Scheffer; Zamor	3:33
4.	"Are You Still in Vallda?"		2:34
5.	"Pure Shores"		3:34
6.	"My Love"		3:12
7.	"Intermezzo"		2:48
8.	"My Hopes & Dreams"		2:43
9.	"Masterplan"		2:48
10.	"Me & Dean"		2:42
Total length:			30:18

Notes

- "Ecstasy" uses elements of "Lollipop" by Lil Wayne featuring Static Major.
