= Maple Leaves (EP) =

EP by Jens Lekman
- Released: 1 October 2003
- Length: 21:30
- Label: Service; Secretly Canadian
- Producer: Jens Lekman

Jens Lekman chronology
7" Vinyl EP (2003)	Maple Leaves (2003)	Rocky Dennis in Heaven (2004)

Alternative cover
- Secretly Canadian release

Professional ratings
Review scores
Source	Rating
AllMusic	4/5 stars
Pitchfork	7.9/10
Uncut	4/5 stars

Maple Leaves is an extended play by Swedish indie pop musician Jens Lekman. It was released on 1 October 2003 on Service and on 3 February 2004 on Secretly Canadian. The songs on the EP can also be found on Lekman's 2005 release, Oh You're So Silent Jens.

The title song "Maple Leaves" centers on a hallmark of Lekman's lyrics, puns and an advanced level of understanding of English idioms. It is a melancholic love song or reflection on lost love about the singer misunderstanding a woman's ennui or disillusionment primarily indicated by her saying "make believe" and the singer optimistically hearing it as "maple leaves".

== Track listing ==
All tracks are written by Jens Lekman, except where noted

No.	Title	Writer(s)	Length
1.	"Maple Leaves"		4:01
2.	"Sky Phenomenon"		4:36
3.	"Pocketful of Money" (omitted from Secretly Canadian release)		4:21
4.	"Black Cab"		4:58
5.	"Someone to Share My Life With"	Dan Treacy	3:34
Total length:			21:30

== Charts ==
Chart (2003–04)	Peak position
Sweden (Sverigetopplistan)	11
