= Willowbank (album) =

Studio album by Yumi Zouma
- Released: 6 October 2017
- Length: 42:16
- Label: Cascine

Yumi Zouma chronology
Yoncalla (2016)	Willowbank (2017)	EP III (2018)

Professional ratings
Aggregate scores
Source	Rating
Metacritic	76/100
Review scores
Source	Rating
AllMusic	3.5/5 stars
DIY	4/5 stars
Exclaim!	8/10

Willowbank is the second studio album by New Zealand band Yumi Zouma. It was released on 6 October 2017 through Cascine.

== Track listing ==
No.	Title	Length
1.	"Depths (Pt. I)"	2:50
2.	"Persephone"	4:33
3.	"December"	3:55
4.	"Half Hour"	3:39
5.	"Us, Together"	3:51
6.	"Gabriel"	2:49
7.	"Carnation"	3:29
8.	"In Blue"	3:02
9.	"Other People"	3:29
10.	"A Memory"	3:41
11.	"Ostra"	4:04
12.	"Depths (Pt. II)"	2:54

== Accolades ==
Publication	Accolade	Rank	Ref.
Blare Magazine	Top 50 Albums of 2017	19	
Gorilla vs. Bear	Top 60 Albums of 2017	14	
The New Zealand Herald	Top 20 Albums of 2017	16	
Under the Radar	Top 100 Albums of 2017	35	
