= Tacking (album) =

Studio album by The Embassy
- Released: 2005
- Genre: Indie pop, house music
- Label: Service
- Producer: Per Idborg, Björn Olsson, Mattias Glavå

The Embassy chronology
Futile Crimes (2002)	Tacking (2005)	Sweet Sensation (2013)

Tacking is the second album by Swedish band the Embassy. It was released in November 2005 on Service.

"Tacking is inevitably going to be tagged as a summer record. I certainly appreciate how perfect this would sound as the soundtrack to a drunken barbeque or even beach party, but I'm in dreary old Sheffield and you know what? Tacking still sounds pretty great to me."
David Coleman, No Ripcord

After the release of Tacking, the group went silent for several years. They have later stated that this was because they lost faith in the traditional album format.

== Track listing ==
1. "Some Indulgence"
2. "Time's Tight"
3. "Stage Persona"
4. "It Pays to Belong"
5. "Lurking with a Distance"
6. "Information"
7. "Paint"
8. "Tell Me"
9. "Was That All It Was"

== Charts ==
Chart (2005)	Peak position
Swedish Albums (Sverigetopplistan)	26
