= Escaping Your Ambitions =

Studio album by The Tough Alliance
- Released: October 05, 2006
- Genre: Electro
- Length: 37:04
- Label: Sincerely Yours

The Tough Alliance chronology
| The New School (2005) | Escaping Your Ambitions (2006) | A New Chance (2006) |

Professional ratings
Review scores
| Source | Rating |
|---|---|
| AllMusic | 4.0/5 stars |

Escaping Your Ambitions is the second studio album by The Tough Alliance, released in 2006. There were only 1000 copies released, half of which were on vinyl.

== Track listing ==
1. "Setting Sail" – 1:07
2. "Leg 1" – 1:26
3. "Leg 2" - 5:31
4. "Leg 3" - 3:18
5. "Leg 4" - 3:19
6. "Leg 5" - 4:20
7. "Echoes Of A Wreck" – 1:08
8. "Leg 6" – 2:46
9. "Leg 7" – 2:37
10. "Leg 8" – 3:07
11. "Leg 9" – 7:36
12. "The Lagoon" – 0:49
