= You Are the Light =

EP by Jens Lekman
- Released: 17 August 2004
- Length: 15:49
- Label: Secretly Canadian

Jens Lekman chronology
Julie (2004)	You Are the Light (2004)	The Opposite of Hallelujah (2005)

Professional ratings
Review scores
Source	Rating
AllMusic	4/5 stars

You Are the Light is an extended play by Swedish indie pop musician Jens Lekman, released on 17 August 2004 by Secretly Canadian. The song contains a reference to the poem Governors On Sominex by David Berman.

== Track listing ==
All tracks are written by Jens Lekman.

No.	Title	Length
1.	"You Are the Light"	3:20
2.	"I Saw Her in the Anti-War Demonstration"	3:13
3.	"A Sweet Summer Night on Hammer Hill"	3:27
4.	"A Man Walks into a Bar"	4:24
5.	"You Are the Light (Reprise)"	1:25
Total length:		15:49
