= I Know What Love Isn't =

Studio album by Jens Lekman
- Released: September 3, 2012
- Recorded: 2009–2012
- Genre: Indie pop
- Length: 38:00
- Label: Service; Secretly Canadian
- Producer: Jens Lekman

Jens Lekman chronology
Night Falls Over Kortedala (2007)	I Know What Love Isn't (2012)	Life Will See You Now (2017)

Singles from I Know What Love Isn't
- 1. "Erica America" Released: June 25, 2012; 2. "I Know What Love Isn't" Released: August 10, 2012

I Know What Love Isn't is the third studio album by Swedish indie pop musician Jens Lekman. The album was released in Europe on September 3, 2012, by Service and in the United States on September 4, 2012, by Secretly Canadian.

"Erica America" was released as the album's lead single on June 25, 2012, followed by "I Know What Love Isn't" on August 10. I Know What Love Isn't was the final album released by Service, who had been Lekman's European label since 2004.

== Critical reception ==
Professional ratings
Aggregate scores
Source	Rating
AnyDecentMusic?	7.3/10
Metacritic	76/100
Review scores
Source	Rating
AllMusic	4/5 stars
American Songwriter	4/5 stars
The A.V. Club	B
The Guardian	3/5 stars
NME	7/10
Pitchfork	7.7/10
PopMatters	8/10
Q	3/5 stars
Rolling Stone	4/5 stars
Uncut	7/10

I Know What Love Isn't received positive reviews from most music critics. At Metacritic, which assigns a normalized rating out of 100 to reviews from mainstream critics, the album received an average score of 76, based on 28 reviews, which indicates "generally favorable reviews".

== Track listing ==
All tracks are written by Jens Lekman.

No.	Title	Length
1.	"Every Little Hair Knows Your Name"	1:26
2.	"Erica America"	3:56
3.	"Become Someone Else's"	4:24
4.	"Some Dandruff on Your Shoulder"	3:41
5.	"She Just Don't Want to Be with You Anymore"	3:53
6.	"I Want a Pair of Cowboy Boots"	2:57
7.	"The World Moves On"	6:11
8.	"The End of the World Is Bigger than Love"	4:41
9.	"I Know What Love Isn't"	3:34
10.	"Every Little Hair Knows Your Name"	3:17
Total length:		38:00

== Personnel ==
Credits for I Know What Love Isn't adapted from liner notes.

- Jens Lekman – vocals, bass, beatboxing, guitar, harp, piano, writing, production, recording

Additional personnel

- Andreas Andersson – flute
- Sophia Brous – harmony vocals
- Gus Franklin – harmony vocals
- Paul Gold – mastering
- Lars-Erik Grimelund – drums
- Charlie Hall – drums
- Marla Hansen – violin
- Tim Harvey – harmony vocals
- Emelie Jonazon – saxophone
- Kristin Lidell – photography
- Brian McTear – recording (drums)
- Ulrika Mild – harmony vocals
- Claudius Mittendorfer – mixing
- Daniel Murphy – layout
- Jonas Odhner – recording (bass and drums)
- Gary Olson – recording (drums)
- Matt Pence – mixing
- Addison Rogers – harmony vocals
- Lewis Rogers – harmony vocals
- Julia Rydholm – bass
- Hilda Stammarnäs – background vocals
- Kellie Sutherland – harmony vocals
- Niclas Svensson – bass
- Frida Thurfjell – recorder, saxophone

== Charts ==
Chart (2012)	Peak position
Swedish Albums (Sverigetopplistan)	3
UK Independent Albums (OCC)	30
US Billboard 200	137
US Heatseekers Albums (Billboard)	2
US Independent Albums (Billboard)	27
US Top Rock Albums (Billboard)	44
