= A jj 12″ =

a jj 12″

EP by jj
- Released: December 2009
- Genre: Indie pop, Balearic beat, Dream pop
- Length: 10:13
- Label: Sincerely Yours

a jj 12″ is an EP by the Swedish band JJ, released on their label Sincerely Yours in December 2009. It consists of two songs from jj n° 2, "from africa to málaga" and "intermezzo", and two previously unreleased songs, "baby" and "the truth". A video for the song "baby", directed by Marcus Söderlund featuring slow-motion footage of horses, was released on the Sincerely Yours website. It was released as a 12″ vinyl in a limited amount and made available for download.

== Track listing ==
1. "from africa to málaga" – 2:50
2. "baby" – 2:04
3. "intermezzo" – 2:48
4. "the truth" – 2:31
