= Songs for Other People's Weddings =

Studio album by Jens Lekman
- Released: September 12, 2025
- Length: 79:37
- Label: Secretly Canadian
- Producer: Daniel Fagerström; Jens Lekman

Jens Lekman chronology
The Linden Trees Are Still in Blossom (2022)	Songs for Other People's Weddings (2025)

Singles from Songs for Other People's Weddings
- 1. "Candy from a Stranger" Released: 10 July 2025; 2. "Wedding in Leipzig" Released: 5 August 2025

Songs for Other People's Weddings is the seventh studio album by Swedish musician Jens Lekman, released on 12 September 2025 on Secretly Canadian. It was accompanied by a novel of the same name, co-released by David Levithan and Lekman on Abrams Press on 5 August 2025.

Released to critical acclaim, and preceded by the singles, "Candy from a Stranger" and "Wedding in Leipzig", the album is a narrative concept album inspired by Lekman's experiences as a wedding singer over several years.

== Background ==
Lekman stated about the production, "The idea to make a narrative concept album felt forbidden. Which, for me, is usually a sign that I'm on the right path." He first communicated to his friend of two decades, David Levithan, his idea of pursuing or creating an alternative to his career of wedding singing. The album alongside a novel was the outcome of the exchange, with Lekman referring to the project as "a dialogue between me and David about love and relationships." Thematically, it centers on the relationship between a wedding singer and his partner, who moves from Gothenburg to pursue a career in New York. Levithan described the story of the project as "fictional" but "emotionally very much both of ours." "Candy from a Stranger" was released on 10 July 2025, as the lead single of the album, alongside a music video, which was edited by Rena Johnson. It was followed by "Wedding in Leipzig" as the second single on 5 August 2025.

== Composition ==
Preceded by Lekman's 2022 full-length releases, The Cherry Trees Are Still in Blossom and The Linden Trees Are Still in Blossom, the album consists of seventeen tracks ranging between three and six minutes each, with the exceptions of "Wedding in Leipzig", containing over ten minutes, and "LEJ-GOT", which has a runtime of less than two minutes. The total runtime of the album is approximately eighty minutes. Originally intended to be a ten-song project, the title and songs of Songs for Other People's Weddings were influenced by Lekman's experience in singing at weddings.

The album was noted as a concept album incorporating multiple genres with songs such as "Speak to Me in Music", "Wedding in Leipzig", and "On a Pier, on the Hudson" were described as "laid back piano ballad", "jaunty pop to reflective ballad", and "danceable". "Speak to Me in Music" represents an angle of the protagonist discussing with a couple regarding the song he would sing at their wedding, and was noted as "delicate without being overly precious" and its melody as timeless. "A Tuxedo Sewn for Two" comprises elements of pop and writing that references Symposium and The Human Centipede.

== Reception ==
Professional ratings
Review scores
Source	Rating
Beats Per Minute	80%
MusicOMH	4.5/5 stars
Pitchfork	7.6/10
Spectrum Culture	66%

The album received a rating of 4.5 stars from London magazine MusicOMH, whose reviewer John Murphy referred to it as "possibly Lekman's best work to date here," calling it "an album that looks at love in all its myriad forms, and does so quite brilliantly." It was given an 80% score by Ray Finlayson of Beats Per Minute, who stated that if the album "proves anything, then it's that he knows exactly what a love song can be, and wields that knowledge with an endearing power."

Pitchfork's Brian Howe, in his review with a rating of 7.6 out of ten, described the project as "a sprawling romance bedazzled with vivid storytelling, absurdist humor, and ebullient flourishes." Scoring the album 66%, Kevin Korber for Spectrum Culture remarked in his review of the album, "the clean, polished sound of the album lends a sense of artifice that can be off-putting, as though one were listening to a fussily constructed piece of theater rather than pop music."

== Track listing ==
All tracks are written by Jens Lekman and David Levithan; "I Want to Want You Again" written with Peter Oren; "Wedding in Leipzig" written with Arrow Brown, Willie J. Clarke, and Clarence H. Reid.

Songs for Other People's Weddings track listing
No.	Title	Length
1.	"The First Lovesong"	4:04
2.	"A Tuxedo Sewn for Two"	5:00
3.	"Candy from a Stranger"	3:45
4.	"Two Little Pigs" (featuring Matilda Sargren)	4:06
5.	"Speak to Me in Music"	5:51
6.	"With You I Can Hear My Own Voice"	4:10
7.	"I Want to Want You Again" (featuring Matilda Sargren and Peter Oren)	5:12
8.	"GOT-JFK"	3:48
9.	"Wedding in Brooklyn"	3:49
10.	"For Skye"	4:26
11.	"Increasingly Obsolete"	4:45
12.	"On a Pier, on the Hudson" (featuring Matilda Sargren)	4:33
13.	"Wedding in Leipzig"	10:33
14.	"LEJ-GOT"	1:36
15.	"You Have One New Message" (featuring Matilda Sargren)	4:11
16.	"Just for One Moment"	5:32
17.	"The Last Lovesong"	4:46
Total length:		79:37

== Personnel ==
Credits adapted from Tidal.

- Jens Lekman – production, engineering (all tracks); vocals (tracks 1–13, 16, 17), guitar (1, 3–6, 8, 9, 11, 17), bass (1, 6, 15, 16), programming (2–16), piano (2–6, 13, 14), synthesizer (9, 10, 12, 14–16); accordion, melodica (13)
- Daniel Fagerström – production, mixing (all tracks); programming (1–3, 9, 11, 12, 15, 16), engineering (1, 2, 4–17), synthesizer (1, 3, 6, 10, 12, 15, 16), bass (2–4, 11), percussion (2, 4, 6, 11, 12), piano (2), vocals (3), sampler (9), loops (10), drums (12), harmonium (13); guitar (17)
- Daniel Bengtsson – engineering (all tracks), piano (1, 17)
- Johan Kjalmarsson – engineering (all tracks), drums (3, 4, 6, 7, 9)
- Gustav Brunn – mastering
- Linnea Olsson – cello (1–3, 5, 6, 13, 15, 17)
- Anna Möller – violin (1, 2, 17)
- Lina Molander – violin (1, 17), viola (17)
- Kristina Florell – vocals (2, 3, 13)
- Isak Hedtjärn – clarinet, saxophone (2, 3)
- Owen Pallett – violin (2, 5, 15)
- Hannah Smallbone – piano (2, 7)
- Stefan Sporsén – trumpet (2, 9)
- Tor Sjödén – drums (2)
- Annie Svedlund – violin (3, 7, 13)
- Agnès Wiklund Pöntinen – vocals (3, 8–10, 13, 15, 16)
- Markus Örn – guitar (3, 11)
- Joakim Hultqvist – saxophone (4, 5, 13)
- Matilda Sargren – vocals (4, 7, 12)
- Rasmus Fleischer – flute (4)
- Loulou Lamotte – vocals (6, 7, 11–13)
- Edvin Edvinsson – bass (7, 9)
- Peter Oren – vocals (7)
- Axel Bauer – piano (9, 12); drums, programming, synthesizer (12)
- Lea-Marie Sittler – saxophone (9)
- Josefine Fagerström – vocals (9)
- Klara Keller – vocals (9)
- Sibille Attar – autoharp (10, 11)
- Calle Malmgren – drums (10)
- Hampus Öhman-Frölund – drums (11)
- Erik Lydig – bass (12, 13)
- Alexander Palmestål – artwork, design
