= Life Will See You Now =

Studio album by Jens Lekman
- Released: 17 February 2017
- Recorded: 2015–16
- Genre: Indie pop
- Length: 41:07
- Label: Secretly Canadian
- Producer: Jens Lekman; Ewan Pearson

Jens Lekman chronology
I Know What Love Isn't (2012)	Life Will See You Now (2017)

Singles from Life Will See You Now
- 1. "What's That Perfume That You Wear?" Released: 4 January 2017; 2. "Evening Prayer" Released: 7 February 2017

Life Will See You Now is the fourth studio album by Swedish indie pop musician Jens Lekman. The album was released on 17 February 2017 through Secretly Canadian.

The album's title and release date were first announced on 4 January 2017, accompanied by the release of its lead single, "What's That Perfume That You Wear?" A second song, "Evening Prayer", was released on 7 February.

== Background ==
Lekman had finished a follow-up record to his third studio album I Know What Love Isn't in 2014, but scrapped it after he felt that the finished product "sounded like [he] had given up". The following year, he launched a project he entitled Postcards, which saw him writing and releasing a new song each week of the year, and his more freeform approach to songwriting on Postcards carried over to the making of Life Will See You Now. In an interview about the making of the album, Lekman said: "I wanted it to be a pop record... I Know What Love Isn't was almost an extreme narrowing of the palette I was using, but for this one I wanted it to be more colorful. I wanted there to be more instruments. I was learning about drum machines and electronic instruments when I was making this."

== Critical reception ==
Professional ratings
Aggregate scores
Source	Rating
AnyDecentMusic?	7.4/10
Metacritic	83/100
Review scores
Source	Rating
AllMusic	3.5/5 stars
Entertainment Weekly	A
The Guardian	5/5 stars
The Irish Times	3/5 stars
The Observer	4/5 stars
Pitchfork	8.0/10
Record Collector	4/5 stars
Rolling Stone	3.5/5 stars
Uncut	8/10
Vice	A

Life Will See You Now received highly positive reviews from music critics. At Metacritic, which assigns a normalized rating out of 100 to reviews from mainstream critics, the album received an average score of 83, based on 23 reviews, which indicates "universal acclaim".

=== Accolades ===
Publication	Accolade	Rank	Ref.
PopMatters	Top 60 Albums of 2017	39	
The Skinny	Top 50 Albums of 2017	30	
Spectrum Culture	Top 20 Albums of 2017	8	
Under the Radar	Top 100 Albums of 2017	37	

== Track listing ==
All tracks are written by Jens Lekman, except where noted.

No.	Title	Writer(s)	Length
1.	"To Know Your Mission" (featuring Loulou Lamotte)		4:56
2.	"Evening Prayer" (featuring Loulou Lamotte)		4:15
3.	"Hotwire the Ferris Wheel" (featuring Tracey Thorn)	Lekman; Tracey Thorn	4:13
4.	"What's That Perfume That You Wear?"		3:30
5.	"Our First Fight"		2:40
6.	"Wedding in Finistère"	Lekman; Malin Nordström	3:24
7.	"How We Met, The Long Version"		4:16
8.	"How Can I Tell Him"		3:56
9.	"Postcard No. 17"		4:21
10.	"Dandelion Seed"		5:36
Total length:			41:07

Sample credits

- "What's That Perfume That You Wear?" contains samples of "The Path", written by Ralph MacDonald, William Eaton, and William Salter, and performed by Ralph MacDonald.
- "How We Met, The Long Version" contains samples of "Don't Stop Dancin'", written by Alvin Stewart and performed by Jackie Stoudemire.

== Personnel ==
Credits for Life Will See You Now adapted from liner notes.

- Jens Lekman – vocals, handclapping, piano, writing, production

Additional personnel

- Madelene Birgenius – piano
- Matt Colton – mastering
- Henri Davies – recording (assistant)
- Alex de Little – trombone
- Alice Dixon – strings
- Anna Eichholz – strings
- Linnéa Eketrä – accordion
- Josa Gerhard – strings
- Ellika Henrikson – photography
- Ellen Hjalmarsson – strings
- Emelie Jonazon – saxophone
- Paul B. Keeves – bass
- Loulou Lamotte – vocals, background vocals
- Kristin Lidell – trumpet
- Sasse Lindblad – mixing
- Malin Nordström – composition
- Jonas Odhner – engineering (horns)
- Ewan Pearson – engineering, handclapping, mixing, production, recording, programming, Solina
- Dominik Petzold – piano
- Guy Sternberg – engineering, recording
- Jackie Stoudemire – sampling
- Tracey Thorn – composition, vocals
- Nathaniel David Utesch – layout
- Klara Wiksten – artwork
- Nicolai Ziel – drums, percussion

== Charts ==
Chart (2017)	Peak position
New Zealand Heatseekers Albums (RMNZ)	8
Swedish Albums (Sverigetopplistan)	14
UK Independent Albums (OCC)	23
US Billboard 200	9
US Heatseekers Albums (Billboard)	9
US Independent Albums (Billboard)	24
US Indie Store Album Sales (Billboard)	23
