= Julie (EP) =

EP by Jens Lekman
- Released: 28 July 2004
- Length: 19:41
- Label: Service

Jens Lekman chronology
I Killed a Party Again (2004)	Julie (2004)	You Are the Light (2004)

Julie is an extended play by Swedish indie pop musician Jens Lekman. It was released on 28 July 2004 on Service. The cover art was designed by Lekman and Rasmus Hägg.

The title song "Julie" is a melancholic love song which starts with an invitation to a vending machine to buy Julie a wedding ring and includes a fatalistic reference to failing to "pray for the angels" and them causing the couple to jump from the Eiffel Tower. Julie also involves a pun between Swedish and English which is a common feature in Lekman's music – Jul is the Swedish name for the Christmas celebration and sleigh bells can be heard in the background.

== Track listing ==
All tracks are written by Jens Lekman

No.	Title	Length
1.	"Julie" (Remix)	3:02
2.	"I Saw Her in the Anti-War Demonstration"	3:11
3.	"A Sweet Summer's Night on Hammer Hill"	3:27
4.	"A Man Walks into a Bar"	4:22
5.	"Another Sweet Summer's Night on Hammer Hill"	5:39
Total length:		19:41

== Charts ==
Chart (2004)	Peak position
Sweden (Sverigetopplistan)	14
