= Kills (mixtape) =

2010 mixtape by JJ

Mixtape by JJ
- Released: 24 December 2010
- Genre: Hip-hop
- Length: 36:51
- Label: No Label (Sincerely Yours)

Kills is a mixtape by Swedish band JJ, released on 24 December 2010.

Professional ratings
Review scores
Source	Rating
Pitchfork Media	(7.6/10)

== Background ==
The mixtape was first mentioned by Elin from JJ in a video interview for Swedish National Television while on tour in Europe. The title for the mixtape was though never revealed. First when the lead single from the mixtape, "Let Them", was released on 12 October, the title of the mixtape was revealed to be Kills (also jj kills or jj fucking kills).

Being a mixtape, Kills was released completely for free, as a direct download, at Sincerely Yours website on Christmas Eve 2010. Before the release, no other tracks besides from "Let Them" was confirmed to be on the mixtape, although several songs containing samples and JJ vocals had been played on different dj-sets by members of JJ. For example, the song "New Work" which has vocals by JJ and contains samples from Jay-Z's Empire State of Mind and lyrics from Broder Daniel's "Work". As mentioned in an interview made as early as February 2010, the songs on the mixtape all "blended together" and created a completely seamless record.

On 17 December, a poster and a trailer for Kills was published on Sincerely Yours website, then confirming that the release date will be December 24, 2010.

== Music video ==
A music video for the first single from the mixtape, "Let Them", was released on December 20, 2010, on Sincerely Yours website. The video, directed by Olivia Kastebring, featured band members Joakim Benon and Elin Kastlander and was mainly location shot inside a church. This single was renamed, remixed, and rerecorded for the mixtape-version, changing the name from "Let Them" to "Kill Them".

== Track listing ==
#	Title	Length	Samples
1	"Still"	2:30	"Still D.R.E." by Dr. Dre featuring Snoop Dogg
2	"Die Tonight"	4:53	"Dynamite" by Taio Cruz; "3 Peat" by Lil Wayne; "Hang with Me" by Robyn
3	"Kill Them"	4:53	"Let Em Talk" by T.I.; "Right Now (Na Na Na)" by Akon; Dialogue from Sympathy for Lady Vengeance by Park Chan-wook
4	"Kill You"	4:55	"Paper Planes" by M.I.A.
5	"New Work"	3:22	"Empire State of Mind" by Jay-Z featuring Alicia Keys
6	"Believe"	2:30	"Can't Believe It" by T-Pain featuring Lil Wayne; An interview with Nicki Minaj by Jabari Johnson; An interview with Nicki Minaj on HOT 97
7	"Pressure Is a Privilege"	3:38	"Under Pressure" by Dr. Dre featuring Jay-Z
8	"Angels"	4:24	"Angels" by Diddy-Dirty Money featuring The Notorious B.I.G.; "You Love Me I Hate You" by Lil Wayne (from Dedication 3)
9	"Boom"	2:02	"Power" by Kanye West
10	"High End"	3:47	"Dark Fantasy" by Kanye West; "Runaway" by Kanye West
