= Amber Oak =

Swedish band

- Origin: Sweden, Skellefteå
- Genres: Indie rock Indie pop
- Years active: 2008–present
- Labels: A West Side Fabrication
- Members: Jonathan Eriksson; Joseph Dahlberg; Alec Hofverberg; Erik Ekersund
- Past members: Albin Marklund
- Website: http://www.myspace.com/amberoak

Amber Oak is a Swedish band from Skellefteå, formed in 2008 by Erik Ekersund, Joseph Dahlberg and Albin Marklund. The band is signed to the Skellefteå-based record label A West Side Fabrication. Vocalist Jonathan Eriksson and bassist Alec Hofverberg joined in 2009.

== History ==
The band began its journey with the release of their EP "Your Missing Piece" on A West Side Fabrication 2009. The song "Audrey", who was played on various Swedish radio stations, was featured on "Your Missing Piece". 2011 the band released their debut album "Illt" which received good reviews in Swedish media. In the same year, they released the single "Words", which had a heavy rotation on various Swedish radio stations. Marklund left the band after Illt's release.

In 2013 they released the EP Ambivalence.

== Members ==
- Jonathan Eriksson - vocals
- Joseph Dahlberg - guitar and backup vocals
- Alec Hofverberg - bass
- Erik Ekersund - drums and percussion

== Discography ==
- 2009 - Your Missing Piece EP
- 2011 - Illt
- 2011 - Words (Single)
- 2013 - Ambivalence EP
