= Hästpojken =

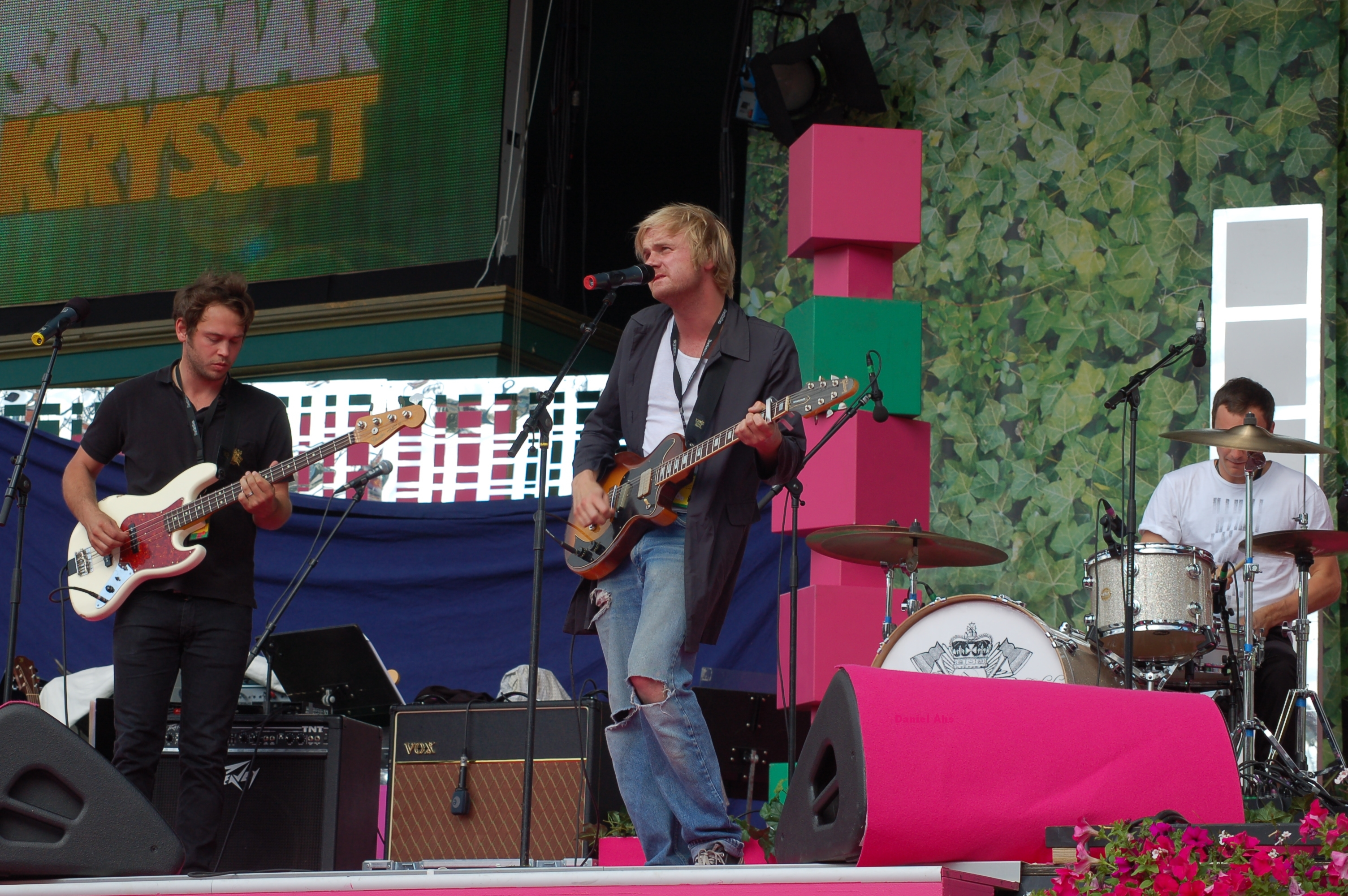
- Hästpojken during Sommarkrysset in Stockholm in 2008

Background information
- Origin: Gothenburg, Sweden
- Genres: Pop rock; indie pop; punk rock
- Years active: 2007-present
- Labels: Roxy Recordings
- Members: Martin Elisson; Adam Bolméus; Nico Janco; Oscar Wallblom; Karl Ander
- Past members: Lars Malmros; Pontus Tenggren; Joel Alme

Hästpojken is a Swedish pop-rock group from Gothenburg. The origin of the name Hästpojken (literally horseboy in Swedish) remains a mystery.

The band was founded in 2007 and originally consisted of Martin Elisson, vocalist from Bad Cash Quartet, Adam Bolméus, guitarist also from the same band and Lars Malmros (Pop-Lars) drummer from Broder Daniel. This line-up released the band's debut album Caligula in 2008. Elisson and Bolmeus would write most of materials. 2010 saw the follow-up album Från där jag ropar after which Lars Malmros left the band. The band would see many changes in the line-up. The band's third album is En magisk tanke released in 2013. In 2014, Hästpojken played with Göteborgs symfoniker. The band is preparing a new album for release in 2015.

In 2014, Hästpojken was nominated as "best group" during P3 Guld awards.

== Members ==
- Martin Elisson — Lead Vocals
- Adam Bolméus — Guitar and backing vocals
- Oscar Wallblom — Bass and backing vocals
- Nico Janco — Drums
- Matti Ollikainen — Piano
- Karl Ander — Guitar, Keyboard and backing vocals

=== Former members ===
- Lars Malmros — drums, percussion (2007-2008)
- Joel Alme — Bass, backing vocals (2007-2008)
- Pontus Tenggren - (????-2010)

=== Stand-ins during live tours ===
- Stefan Sporsén — Piano
- Henrik Lindén — Bass and backing vocals

== Discography ==
=== Albums ===
Year	Title	Peak chart positions	Certification
Year	Title	SWE	Certification
2008	Caligula	15	
2010	Från där jag ropar	7	
2013	En magisk tanke	5	
2018	Hästpojken är död	20	

=== Singles ===
Year	Title	Peak chart positions	Album
Year	Title	SWE	Album
2009	"Gitarrer & bas, trummor & hat"	32	

Others (non-charting)

- 2007: "Shane MacGowan"
- 2008: "Caligula"
- 2008: "Här har du ditt liv"
- 2010: "Jag e jag"
- 2012: "Samma himlar"
- 2013: "Sommarvin"
