= Jens Lekman =

Swedish musician and songwriter (born 1981)

- Lekman performing in Minneapolis in 2022

Background information
- Born: Jens Martin Lekman; 6 February 1981 (age 45); Angered, Gothenburg, Sweden
- Origin: Gothenburg, Sweden
- Genre: Indie pop
- Occupations: Musician, songwriter
- Instruments: Vocals; guitar; ukulele; MPC
- Years active: 2000–present
- Labels: Service; Secretly Canadian
- Website: jenslekman.com

Jens Martin Lekman (pronounced [jɛns ˈmǎʈːɪn ˈlêːkman]; born 6 February 1981) is a Swedish musician. His music is guitar-based pop with heavy use of samples and strings, with lyrics that are often witty, romantic, and melancholic. His work is heavily influenced by Jonathan Richman and Belle & Sebastian, and he has been likened to Stephin Merritt (of The Magnetic Fields), David Byrne, and Scott Walker.

== Early life ==
Lekman was born 6 February 1981 in Angered, Gothenburg. As a child, he was not particularly interested in music, but the age of fourteen he was asked to play bass in a friend's cover band. This sparked his own songwriting and he quickly came to write hundreds of songs.

Gradually, he adopted the pseudonym Rocky Dennis, a name he borrowed from the protagonist in the movie Mask. Under this name, he began releasing limited edition CD-R discs, the first of which was 2001's The Budgie. In the early 2000s, he sent a collection of the songs to the American record label Secretly Canadian, who contracted him.

== Music career ==
From 2000 to 2003, Lekman recorded and released much of his material privately on CD-R. Because one of his songs during this time was titled "Rocky Dennis' Farewell Song to the Blind Girl", inspired by the movie Mask, Lekman was mistakenly referred to as "Rocky Dennis". Lekman says that it was a "mistake": "someone thought that was my real name cause I had a song about him, and then radio picked up on it, and I never had a chance to change it". He put the confusion to rest with his Rocky Dennis in Heaven EP (2004).

In 2003, Lekman self-released a 7" vinyl EP, Maple Leaves, which was later released on CD by the Swedish independent label Service Records. The songs "Maple Leaves" and "Black Cab" were heavily played on Swedish national radio and the former garnered significant attention through file-sharing platforms. His work has proven to be considerably more successful in Sweden than America. (Note: Metcalf reasoned this is due to "a couple of minor artistic transgressions. First, he is, yes, it’s true, prone to the sort of twee self-regard that converted Wes Anderson, midcareer, from a promising filmmaker into an antique tea table. Second, his influences and affinities are instantly obvious: Stephin Merritt’s drone, Morrissey’s bite, Belle and Sebastian’s atmospherics, with some of Jonathan Richman’s wild pitch and yaw.") He soon signed a contract with the American label Secretly Canadian for releases outside of Sweden. Heavy touring and his debut album soon followed.

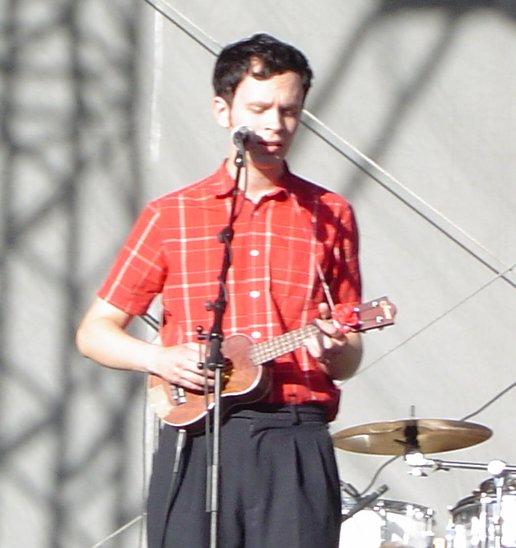
Lekman performing live in Stockholm in 2004

His first album When I Said I Wanted to Be Your Dog was released in 2004, and consisted of recordings made between 2000 and 2004 (some tracks had been previously released independently by Lekman). The album attracted attention among the alternative music press in both Europe and the U.S. The song "You Are the Light" was a successful radio hit, and a video received some rotation in the Nordic MTV and ZTV. In Sweden, the album reached No. 6 on the national chart. Lekman was nominated for three Swedish Grammies, three P3 Guld and three Manifest awards, and the album was named the album of the year by Nöjesguiden.

A concert film shot from Lekman's sold-out show with José González at Göteborg Concert Hall in December 2003 was broadcast by Swedish national television in 2005. In June 2005, a compilation CD of Lekman's first three EPs (plus extra tracks) was released as Oh You're So Silent Jens. Lekman's cover of Scout Niblett's "Your Beat Kicks Back Like Death" appeared on Secretly Canadian's SC100 compilation. Night Falls Over Kortedala was released in Sweden on 5 September 2007 and worldwide on 9 October 2007. The single "Friday Night at the Drive-in Bingo" preceded the album's release.

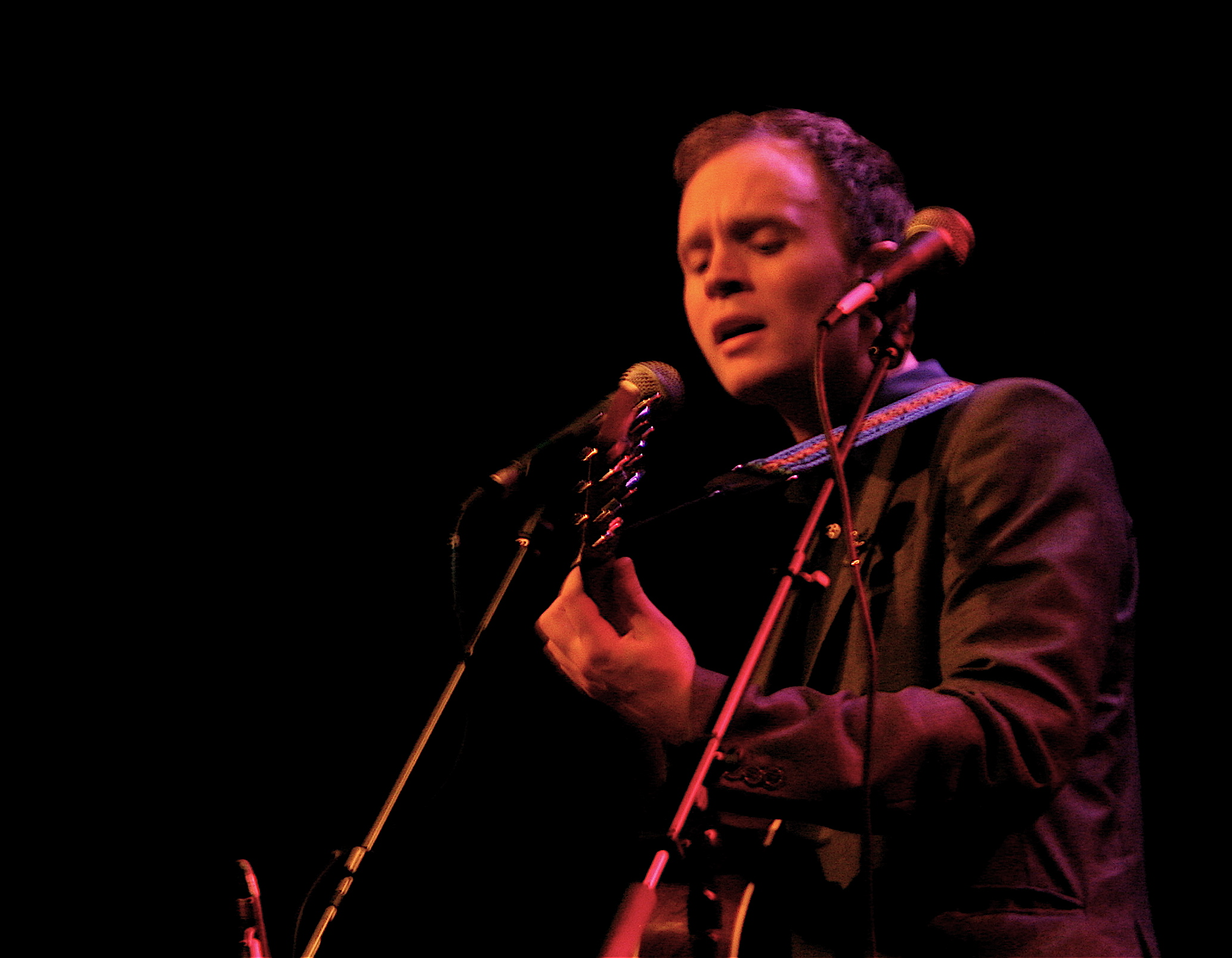
Lekman onstage in the Music Hall of Williamsburg in Brooklyn, New York, USA in October 2007

Live performances by Lekman have differed in style; at times he has performed alone with only a guitar and a CD player, sometimes doing a cappella versions of his songs, while at other times he has been accompanied by a choir and string quartet. In 2008, he toured with an all-female back-up band (dressed mostly in white) that provided basic rock instrumentation as well as horns and backing vocals. In December 2008 Jens played a short China tour organised by Split Works. In 2010, Lekman released a free song entitled "The End of the World is Bigger Than Love" online. This was his first release in three years.

On 19 March 2011, Lekman played a show in support of libraries during the widespread closures in the United Kingdom where he premiered a new song, "Every Little Hair Knows Your Name".

Lekman's An Argument With Myself EP was released in September 2011 to generally favorable reviews. This was followed up by I Know What Love Isn't in September 2012, Lekman's first full-length album since 2007, also receiving favorable reviews.

On 2 September 2014, Lekman released a 33-minute-long mixtape titled WWJD, which included three unreleased songs: "WWJD", "I Remember", and "What's That Perfume That You Wear?" The mixtape has been described as being "one cohesive experience as intimate as writing a postcard, as pleasant as receiving one."

All through 2015, Jens Lekman released a new song every week on his website for free. They are all titled Postcard with the number of the week, making 52 tracks in total. In parallel, he led a musical experiment called Ghostwriting where he translates into songs stories submitted to him by the public. The first installment was held in Stockholm and yield 5 tracks in Swedish. The second installment was held in Cincinnati and 11 English tracks came out of it. They bring the total of his 2015 output to 68 tracks and they can all be downloaded on his website.

Lekman's fourth proper LP, Life Will See You Now, was released on 17 February 2017, on the Secretly Canadian label.

On 21 March 2022, Lekman's most popular and successful album, Night Falls Over Kortedala, was removed from all streaming services and made unavailable to purchase. This move was met with shock by fans, with whom the album is very popular. Lekman cited legal issues as the main reason due to sampling issues.

On 27 April 2022, Lekman announced the reissue of two of his albums that had previously been made unavailable: Oh You're So Silent Jens and Night Falls Over Kortedala. They were reissued respectively as The Cherry Trees Are Still in Blossom and The Linden Trees Are Still in Blossom. The reissued versions of the albums are composed of re-recordings of all the original tracks, as well as entirely new tracks. The Cherry Trees Are Still in Blossom was released digitally on 27 April 2022, whereas The Linden Trees Are Still in Blossom was digitally released on 4 May 2022. Both albums were released physically on 3 June 2022 via record label Secretly Canadian.

On 12 September 2025, Lekman released his seventh studio album, Songs for Other People's Weddings, via Secretly Canadian. A narrative concept album inspired by his performances as wedding singer, the album was also accompanied by a novel, co-written with David Levithan.

== Artistry ==
Stephen Metcalf noted that Lekman differs from his influences, among them Morrissey and Stephin Merritt, by fashioning a coyness in his songs about sex – a demeanor that is euphemistic or "even aseptically unsexual" – although he similarly writes of passion and longing. He has often made use of samples, comparable to that of the Avalanches, who he admits to have "rip[ped] off".

== Discography ==
=== Albums ===
Title	Album details	Peak chart positions	
Title	Album details	SWE	US
When I Said I Wanted to Be Your Dog	Released: 7 April 2004; Label: Service; Re-released: 7 September 2004; Label: Secretly Canadian	6	—
Night Falls Over Kortedala	Released: 5 September 2007; Label: Service; Re-released: 9 October 2007; Label: Secretly Canadian	1	192
I Know What Love Isn't	Released: 4 September 2012; Label: Secretly Canadian	3	137
Life Will See You Now	Released: 17 February 2017; Label: Secretly Canadian	14	—
The Cherry Trees Are Still in Blossom	Released: 27 April 2022; Label: Secretly Canadian	—	—
The Linden Trees Are Still in Blossom	Released: 4 May 2022; Label: Secretly Canadian	—	—
Songs for Other People's Weddings	Released: 12 September 2025; Label: Secretly Canadian	—	—

=== Compilations ===
- Oh You're So Silent Jens (Service Records, 8 June 2005; Secretly Canadian, 22 November 2005) – a collection of previously released singles, EPs, and compilation appearances

=== EPs ===
- The Insect EP (self-released, 2000) – 20 copies
- 7" Vinyl EP (self-released, 2003) – 250 copies
- Maple Leaves (Service Records, 1 October 2003; Secretly Canadian, 3 February 2004)
- Rocky Dennis (Service Records, 21 January 2004; Secretly Canadian, 6 April 2004)
- I Killed a Party Again (self-released, 29 May 2004) – 100 copies
- Julie (Service Records, 28 July 2004) – 2000 copies
- You Are the Light (Secretly Canadian, 17 August 2004)
- The Opposite of Hallelujah (Thievery; Evil Evil, January 2005)
- Live at Stora Teatern (Secretly Canadian, 15 February 2005)
- You Deserve Someone Better Than a Bum Like Me (self-released, May 2005)
- USA October 2005 (self-released, October 2005)
- Kalendervägen 113.D (Service Records, 2007) Bonus EP included with initial copies of "Night Falls Over Kortedala"
- An Argument With Myself EP (Secretly Canadian, September 2011)
- WWJD (2014)

=== Singles ===
- Jens Lekman/José González (Service Records, January 2004) – 300 copies, contains "If You Ever Need A Stranger (To Sing at Your Wedding)"
- El Perro del Mar/Jens Lekman (Secretly Canadian,30 October 2004) – contains " I Don't Know If She's Worth 900 Kronor"
- Jens Lekman/Blood Music (Insound, November 2006) – contains "A Sweet Summer's Night on Hammer Hill", with spoken word introduction
- "Friday Night at the Drive-In Bingo" / "Radio NRJ" (Service Records, 14 July 2007) – 800 copies
- The End of the World Is Bigger Than Love (self-released, 2010)
- The Postcards series was released digitally throughout 2015: one song each week. Of the 52, No. 17 was released on Life Will See You Now.

=== Collaborations ===
- Kajak – Benni Hemm Hemm (2007) – guest vocals on "Aldrei"
- Något dåligt nytt har hänt – Vapnet (2007) – guest vocals on "Håll ihop"
- Kingdom Came – Kocky (2007) – guest vocals on "Be Part of It All"
- Yeah! Oh Yeah! (2009) – Duet with Tracey Thorn for "SCORE! 20 Years of Merge Records: The Covers!"
- Inside (The Corrections) – Duet with New Buffalo
- Here Comes the Rain EP (2006) The Ladybug Transistor – Backing Vocals on "Here Comes the Rain"
- Clocks/Pretender (2007) – Duet with Montt Mardie on "Castle in The Sky"
- Mena (2010) – Javiera Mena – guest vocals on "Sufrir"
- Breakfast in America – Viktor Sjöberg (2010) – guest vocals on "A Million Bucks"
- CORRESPONDENCE (2019) – Collaboration with Annika Norlin

=== Compilation appearances ===
- En Garde Fanzine CD-R (2003) – contains "F-Word" and "Sky Phenomenon"
- Based on a True Story (2004) – contains "Be Good"
- Accelerator Compilation (July 2004) – contains "The Wrong Hands"
- Risky Dazzle: A Service Party Shuffle (January 2005) – contains "Maple Leaves", "And I Remember Every Kiss (Demo Version)" (previously unreleased), and "You Are the Light (Reprise)"
- Rallye Cloak 02: Swim Sweet Swedish (24 August 2005) – contains "Boisa-Bis-O-Boisa"
- SC100 (24 April 2007) – contains a cover of Scout Niblett's songs "Your Beat Kicks Back Like Death" and "Shining/Burning"
- Four Songs by Arthur Russell (20 August 2007) – contains "A Little Lost"
- Whip It! (29 September 2009) – contains "Your Arms Around Me"
- Det ordnar sig (February 2014) – contains a cover of Peter Lunblad's "Ta Mig Till Havet"
