= Sweet Sensation (The Embassy album) =

Studio album by The Embassy
- Released: February 26, 2013
- Genre: Indie pop, house music
- Label: International

The Embassy chronology
Tacking (2005)	Sweet Sensation (2013)	White Lake (2018)

Sweet Sensation is the third album by Swedish band the Embassy. It was released February 26, 2013 on International.

The album clearly showcases the groups influences of club music while still keeping their distinct sound. During their following tour, the band collaborated with the lighting artist Thomas Hämén. They had previously experimented with light by turning on the light over the audience and keeping the stage in the dark.

== Track listing ==
1. "Roundkick"
2. "Related Artist"
3. "International"
4. "Livin' Is Easy"
5. "Nightshift"
6. "I-D"
7. "It's Always a New Thing"
8. "U"
9. "Everything I Ever Wanted"
