= The Opposite of Hallelujah (EP) =

EP by Jens Lekman
- Released: January 2005
- Genre: Indie pop
- Length: 15:37
- Label: Thievery Records; Evil Evil Records

Professional ratings
Review scores
Source	Rating
The Winnipeg Sun	3.5/5 stars

The Opposite of Hallelujah is an EP by Swedish musician Jens Lekman.

The track "The Opposite of Hallelujah" was listed as the 416th best song of the 2000s by Pitchfork.

== Track listing ==
All tracks are written by Jens Lekman.

No.	Title	Length
1.	"The Opposite of Hallelujah"	4:26
2.	"No Time for Breaking Up"	4:29
3.	"I Don't Wanna Die Alone"	3:33
4.	"Love Is Still a Mystery"	3:09
Total length:		15:37
