= Ceo (musician) =

Musical artist

ceo
- Born: Eric Dan Ingemar Berglund; 1981 (age 44–45); Gothenburg, Sweden
- Genres: Synthpop, indie pop
- Occupations: Singer-songwriter, guitarist
- Instruments: Vocals, guitar
- Years active: 2001–present
- Labels: Sincerely Yours, Modular
- Formerly of: The Tough Alliance

CEO (previously stylized as ceo) is the solo pop project of Eric Dan Ingemar Berglund, previously a member of the Swedish electronic music duo The Tough Alliance of the independent label Sincerely Yours.

== History ==
The project was announced in April 2010 and was initially signed to the label Sincerely Yours. In June 2010, CEO released his debut solo album, White Magic. Singles included the title track and "Come With Me".

In February 2014, CEO released the follow-up, Wonderland.

=== Discography ===
==== Studio albums ====
- White Magic (2010)
- Wonderland (2014)
