= The Tough Alliance =

Swedish electronic pop music duo

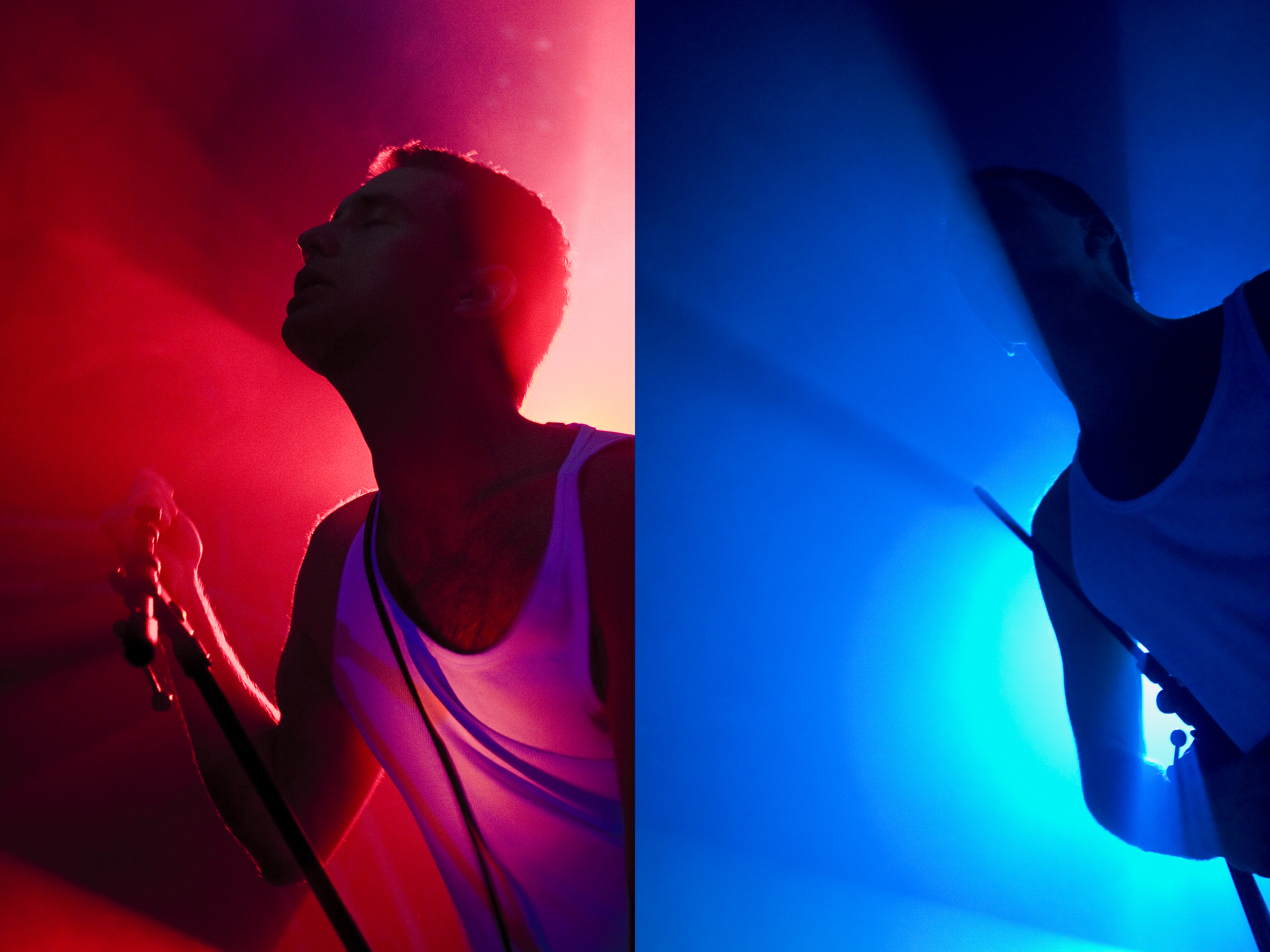

Background information
- Origin: Gothenburg, Sweden
- Genres: Electropop, electronica
- Years active: 2001–2009
- Past members: Eric Berglund; Henning Fürst

The Tough Alliance, or TTA, was an electronic pop music duo from Gothenburg, Sweden. The duo first came together in 2003 and consisted of childhood friends Henning Fürst and Eric Berglund. Previously on Swedish record label Service, in 2006, they started their own label, Sincerely Yours.

They released four EPs, Make It Happen, Holiday, New Waves, and Prison Break and three full-length studio albums, The New School, Escaping Your Ambitions and A New Chance, (Escaping Your Ambitions being an entirely instrumental album). Their live shows included swinging baseball bats and singing to recorded music. During a show in Stockholm, Sweden, the two band members were thrown off stage after swinging a baseball bat. Their critics claim they glorify violence in general and hooliganism in particular. The Guardian's Paul Lester compared their music to that of Depeche Mode, Howard Jones, OMD and New Order.

In April 2010, Eric Berglund's solo project ceo emerged via the Sincerely Yours website, which prompted speculations that The Tough Alliance had disbanded. Eric Berglund first denied but in August stated in an interview with the Swedish newspaper Göteborgs-Posten, that he and Fürst were nothing more than "teammates in a football team". "The Tough Alliance was a stepping stone in my career, but I'm ready to make something new with ceo".

== Discography ==
=== Albums ===
- The New School (2005)
- Escaping Your Ambitions (2006)
- A New Chance (2007)

=== EPs ===
- Make It Happen (2004)
- Holiday (2004)
- New Waves (2006)
- Neo Violence (2008)
- Prison Break (2009) – mp3-only digital release of remixes
