= Sincerely Yours (record label) =

Independent record label

Sincerely Yours is a Gothenburg-based independent record label formed in 2005 by the Swedish electronic pop duo The Tough Alliance. The duo created the record label after they left their former label Service. The Tough Alliance began by releasing their own music but has since then signed and released music from many different acts then themselves.

Besides releasing music, the record label has a history of releasing high end products such as bulletproof vests, armlets, wine, shirts and jackets. Every product, as with most of their vinyl releases, are sold in a limited edition.

== Bands and artists ==
- Nordpolen
- jj
- Kendal Johansson
- Avner
- The Honeydrips
- Jonas Game
- Joel Alme
- The Tough Alliance
- ceo
- Team Rockit
- Merely

== Discography ==
Sincerely Yours catalog – Physical releases only (No digital singles)
Artist	Title	Format	Release date
The Tough Alliance	New Waves	CDEP	May 2006
The Tough Alliance	Escaping Your Ambitions	CD	September 2006
Air France	On Trade Winds	CDEP	December 2006
The Honeydrips	(Lack Of) Love Will Tear Us Apart	CDS	February 2007
The Tough Alliance	Escaping Your Ambitions (Record version of the CD with the same name)	LP	March 2007
The Honeydrips	Here Comes The Future	CD	March 2007
The Tough Alliance	First Class Riot	7"-single	May 2007
The Tough Alliance	A New Chance	CD/LP	May 2007
The Honeydrips	I Wouldn't Know What To Do	CDS	June 2007
Jonas Game	New City Love	7"-single	June 2007
Jonas Game	ADHD	CD	October 2007
Joel Alme	The Queen's Corner	7"-single	March 2008
The Tough Alliance	Neo Violence	7"-single	March 2008
Joel Alme	A Master of Ceremonies	CD	April 2008
Nordpolen	Skimret	CDS	May 2008
Air France	No Way Down	CD/LP	May 2008
The Tough Alliance	Neo Neo (Neo Violence remixes)	12"	September 2008
Nordpolen	På Nordpolen	CD	September 2008
The Tough Alliance	A New New Chance (International edition of A New Chance)	CD	October 2008
jj	jj n° 1	7"-single	March 2009
Avner	Lyssna	CD	May 2009
Memory Cassette	Call & Response	7"-single	June 2009
jj	jj n° 2	CD	July 2009
Memory Tapes	Seek Magic	LP	June 2009
jj	a jj 12"	12"	December 2009
jj	jj n° 2.1 (Record version of jj n° 2, includes one extra song)	LP	December 2009
jj	jj n° 3	CD/LP	March 2010
Kendal Johansson	Blue Moon	7"-single	May 2010
ceo	Come With Me	7"-single	June 2010
ceo	White Magic	CD/LP	June 2010
Sail A Whale	A Documentation	LP	November 2010
ceo	Illuminata	7"-single	December 2010
Team Rockit	Första Hjälpen	7"-single	May 2011
jj	No One Can Touch Us Tonight	12"-single	May 2011
Team Rockit	1988	LP	July 2011
jj	jj nº 4	7"-single	April 2012
Nordpolen	Vi Är Många Som Är Vakna I Natt	CD/LP	March 2013
