= Service (record label) =

Swedish record label

Service is a Swedish record label founded in 2001 by Ola Borgström together with Dan Lissvik in Gothenburg. Service has released records by, among others, Studio, The Embassy, Franke, Jens Lekman, Erik de Vahl, The Tough Alliance, Lake Heartbeat and Ikons. Service has been called Sweden's most important record label and has, despite its underground character, been influental for music in Sweden and beyond in the 21:st century.

With Jens Lekman's Night Falls Over Kortedala (2007), Service had a number one on the album chart. Other albums by Jens Lekman, The Embassy and The Tough Alliance also charted in the top 20. Kleerup and Robyn's With Every Heartbeat was first released by Service's imprint Risky Dazzle.

The label was awarded the Vice Label Award 2009 for "its spotless catalogue, a strong last year, design that is always the best in our eyes and a fearless approach to online distribution".

In 2012 Borgström announced that the label would stop issuing new material.

== Bands and artists ==
- Studio
- The Embassy
- Franke
- Ikons
- Jackpot
- Lake Heartbeat
- Jens Lekman
- The Tough Alliance
- Erik de Vahl
- The Whitest Boy Alive

== Catalog ==
Catalog number	Artist	Title	Format
SERV001	Studio	"The End of Fame"	7"
SERV002	Studio	"The Jungle"	7"
SERV003	Studio	"Down Here, Like You"	7"
SERV004	The Embassy	"It Never Entered My Mind"	7"
SERV005	The Embassy	"The Pointer"	single
SERV006	The Embassy	Futile Crimes	album
SERV007	Franke	Ställs mot dig	EP
SERV008	Franke	Optimismens hån	album
SERV009	Jens Lekman	Maple Leaves	EP
SERV010	Erik de Vahl	Secrets Adrift	album
SERV011	Jens Lekman	Rocky Dennis In Heaven	EP
SERV012	Jens Lekman / José Gonzáles	"If You Ever Need a Stranger"	7"
SERV013	The Tough Alliance	Make It Happen	EP
SERV014	The Embassy	Wearing Our Pop Art Hearts...	EP
SERV015	Jens Lekman	When I Said I Wanted To Be Your Dog	album
SERV016	Jens Lekman	Julie EP	EP
SERV017	The Tough Alliance	Holiday	EP
SERV018	Olika artister	Risky Dazzle - a Service Party Shuffle	album
SERV019	The Tough Alliance	The New School	album
SERV020	Jens Lekman	"Oh, You're So Silent Jens"	album
SERV021	The Embassy	"Some Indulgence"	single
SERV022	Cat5	"Play This Loud"	single
SERV023	Erik de Vahl	Friendly Fire	album
SERV024	The Embassy	Tacking	album
SERV025	Harlem	Game/Watch	EP
SERV026	The Whitest Boy Alive	"Burning"	single
SERV027	The Whitest Boy Alive	Dreams	album
SERV028	The Embassy	A Compact Disc Including The Embassy	EP
SERV029	The Embassy	"Some Indulgence rewind"	single
SERV030	Jens Lekman	"Friday Night at the Drive-In Bingo"	7" single
SERV031	Jens Lekman	Night Falls Over Kortedala	album
SERV032	Jackpot	"Uno Dos Tres / Move In the Light"	12"
SERV033	Kool Dj Dust	The Disco Opera	album
SERV034	The Embassy	"You Tend to Forget"	12"
SERV035	Lake Heartbeat	Trust In Numbers	album
SERV036	Ikons	Ikons	album
SERV037	Forest	Forest	album
SERV038	Jens Lekman	An Argument With Myself	EP
SERV039	The Embassy	Life In the Trenches	album
SERV040	Ikons	Life Rhythm	album
SERV041	Jens Lekman	I Know What Love Isn't	album

== See also ==
- List of record labels
