= Alex Edkins =

Canadian Singer and Songwriter

- Born: Ottawa, Ontario, Canada
- Occupations: Singer, songwriter, composer, producer
- Instruments: Vocals, guitar
- Years active: 2007–present
- Labels: Sub Pop (Metz); Telephone Explosion (LIDS)

Alex Edkins is a Canadian musician, songwriter, and producer from Ottawa, Canada. He is best known as the frontman of Metz, Edkins has also released two solo albums as Weird Nightmare. Together with the keyboardist Graham Walsh he formed the studio-project Noble Rot and released the album Heavenly Bodies, Repetition, Control.

In addition to this Edkins has contributed music to the film Don't Fall In Love With Yourself, the video game Grand Theft Auto V, a soundtrack for the CBC series The Outlaw Ocean, and digital art installations for artist Mitchell F. Chan.

== Career ==
Edkins worked in record store in Ottawa while performing with various bands. After meeting Hayden Menzies, they relocated to Toronto.

=== Metz ===
Edkins co-founded Metz in the late 2007s, signing to Sub Pop for their self-titled debut album in 2012. The record received critical acclaim and was named Best New Music by Pitchfork. It was also shortlisted for the 2013 Polaris Music Prize. The 2015 album, II, was longlisted for the Polaris Prize while their third album, Strange Peace (2017), earned a nomination for the Metal/Hard Music Album of the Year at the 2018 Juno Awards. In 2024, METZ's studio album Up on Gravity Hill won the Libera Award for Best Heavy Record. In 2024 the band announced an indefinite hiatus.

During this time, he also formed the band Lids with Brian Borcherdt and Doug MacGregor and released two singles.

=== Weird Nightmare ===
In 2022, Edkins launched his solo project Weird Nightmare, releasing a self-titled debut album on Sub Pop. The album received positive reviews from critics. BrooklynVegan included it in its "Indie Basement: Best Albums & Songs of May 2022. The album features contributions by Chad VanGaalen, Alica Bognanno, Graham Walsh and Loel Campbell. Edkins formed a live band for selected live dates that included Jesse Laderoute, Jim MacAlpine and Michael Catano.

In 2024 he collabrated with Julianna Riolino and appeared on her album Echo in Dust, while co-producing Cosmic Kitten during the recording of their self-titled debut-album.

In May 2026, Edkins released a second album Hoopla under the same moniker. Co-produced by Jim Eno, it features Julianna Riolino, Loel Campbell and Roddy Kuester.

== Discography ==
=== Albums ===
as Weird Nightmare

- Weird Nightmare (Sub Pop, 2022)
- Hoopla (Sub Pop, 2026)

In addition to this work, Edkins has contributed to a variety of multimedia projects.

==== Video games ====
- Grand Theft Auto V – original music for the in-game soundtrack, including METZ's track "Wet Blanket".

==== Podcasts ====
- CBC – The Outlaw Ocean (Season 2) – original score

==== Art collaborations ====
- Mitchell F. Chan – Boys of Summer
- Mitchell F. Chan – Overture Series
- Mitchell F. Chan – Insert Coin(s)

==== Film ====
- Don't Fall In Love With Yourself – music department (documentary on musician Justin Pearson)
