= Cover Your Tracks =

Cover Your Tracks may refer to:

- Cover Your Tracks (band) American metalcore band from Atlanta, Georgia.
- Cover Your Tracks (album), by Bury Your Dead 2004
- Cover Your Tracks, compilation album by Deep Elm Records 2007
- Cover Your Tracks, EP Young Galaxy
- "Cover Your Tracks", song from Shapeshifting (Young Galaxy album)
- "Cover Your Tracks", song by A Boy and His Kite from The Twilight Saga: Breaking Dawn – Part 2 (soundtrack)
