= Automat (Metz album) =

Compilation album by METZ
- Released: July 12, 2019
- Recorded: 2009–2015
- Studios: Dream House (Toronto); Halla Music (Toronto); Giant Studios (Toronto); Union Sound Company (Toronto)
- Genres: Noise rock; hardcore punk; garage punk; indie rock
- Length: 43:05
- Label: Sub Pop
- Producer: METZ

METZ chronology
Strange Peace (2017)	Automat (2019)	Atlas Vending (2020)

Automat is the first compilation album by Canadian noise rock band METZ. It was released on July 12, 2019, through Sub Pop Records, and is composed of non-album singles, b-sides, rarities, and previously unreleased work recorded from 2009 to 2015.

Professional ratings
Aggregate scores
Source	Rating
AnyDecentMusic?	6.8/10
Metacritic	72/100
Review scores
Source	Rating
AllMusic	4/5 stars
Clash	7/10
Crack Magazine	7/10
Exclaim!	8/10
Kerrang!	3/5
musicOMH	3/5 stars
Paste	7/10
The Spill Magazine	4/5 stars
Upset Magazine	3/5 stars

Automat was met with generally favorable reviews from music critics. At Metacritic, which assigns a normalized rating out of 100 to reviews from mainstream publications, the album received an average score of 72 based on seven reviews. The aggregator AnyDecentMusic? has the critical consensus of the album at a 6.8 out of 10, based on seven reviews.

== Track listing ==
All tracks are written by Alex Edkins, Chris Slorach and Hayden Menzies.

No.	Title	Length
1.	"Soft Whiteout"	3:06
2.	"Lump Sums"	4:39
3.	"Dry Out"	3:55
4.	"Ripped on the Fence"	5:54
5.	"Negative Space" (7 Inch Version)	3:17
6.	"Automat"	4:00
7.	"Wet Blanket" (Demo)	3:10
8.	"Dirty Shirt"	2:29
9.	"Leave Me Outside"	3:36
10.	"Can't Understand"	2:47
11.	"Pure Auto"	3:08
12.	"Eraser"	3:09
Total length:		43:05

Notes

- Tracks 1–6 were recorded and mixed at Halla Music and Giant Studios in Toronto during 2009–10, originally released via We Are Busy Bodies
- Track 7 was recorded in 2011 and originally released via Deadstock/Castor Design
- Tracks 8–10 were recorded and mixed at the Dream House in Toronto during 2012–13, originally released via Sub Pop Records
- Tracks 11–12 were recorded and mixed at Union Sound Company in Toronto in 2015, originally released via Three One G

== Charts ==
Chart (2019)	Peak position
US Independent Albums (Billboard)	33
US Heatseekers Albums (Billboard)	13
