= Faded Gloryville =

Studio album by Lindi Ortega
- Released: August 7, 2015
- Studio: Sound Emporium (Nashville, Tennessee); Muscle Shoals (Sheffield, Alabama)
- Genre: Country
- Length: 36:30
- Label: Grand Tour Records
- Producer: Dave Cobb; Colin Linden

Lindi Ortega chronology
Tin Star (2013)	Faded Gloryville (2015)	Liberty (2018)

Faded Gloryville is the fourth full-length album released by Lindi Ortega on Last Gang Records imprint Grand Tour Records August 7, 2015.

Ortega recorded Faded Gloryville in spurts, splitting the workload between three different producers. Dave Cobb, who'd sat behind the boards for Tin Star, recorded three songs at the Sound Emporium Studios in Nashville, while Colin Linden, the producer of Ortega's 2012 release, Cigarettes & Truckstops, recorded four. Rounding out the sessions were three songs tracked in Muscle Shoals, including a Nina Simone-inspired update of the Bee Gees classic "To Love Somebody."

== Track listing ==
No.	Title	Writer(s)	Length
1.	"Ashes"	Linda Ortega, James Robertson	4:35
2.	"Faded Gloryville"	Ortega	3:12
3.	"Tell It Like It Is"	Ortega	3:46
4.	"Someday Soon"	Ortega, John Paul White	3:36
5.	"To Love Somebody"	Barry Gibb, Robin Gibb	3:27
6.	"When You Ain't Home"	Ortega, Brice Long	3:41
7.	"Run-Down Neighborhood"	Ortega, Bruce Wallace	3:07
8.	"I Ain't The Girl"	Ortega	3:25
9.	"Run Amuck"	Ortega, Tofer Brown	4:19
10.	"Half Moon"	Ortega, Dan Brigham, Trent Dabbs	3:22

== Personnel ==
- Brian Allen- bass guitar
- Rob Alley- trumpet
- Dave Cobb- acoustic guitar
- Jason "Rowdy" Cope- electric guitar
- Gary Craig- drums, percussion
- John Dymond- bass guitar
- Caleb Elliott- cello
- Jeremy Fetzer- electric guitar
- Chad Fisher- trombone
- Ian Fitchuk- organ
- Jeremy Gibson- drums, percussion
- David Hood- bass guitar
- Colin Linden- acoustic guitar, electric guitar
- Lindi Ortega- lead vocals, background vocals
- Bryan Owings- drums, percussion
- Chris Powell- drums, percussion
- James Robertson- electric guitar
- Kimi Samson- violin
- Ben Tanner- keyboards
- John Paul White- acoustic guitar, background vocals

== Chart performance ==
The album debuted at No. 39 on the Top Country Albums chart, selling 1,300 copies in the US.

Chart (2015)	Peak position
US Top Country Albums (Billboard)	39
US Heatseekers Albums (Billboard)	12
US Independent Albums (Billboard)	38
