= Dan Lissvik =

Swedish artist and musician (born 1978)

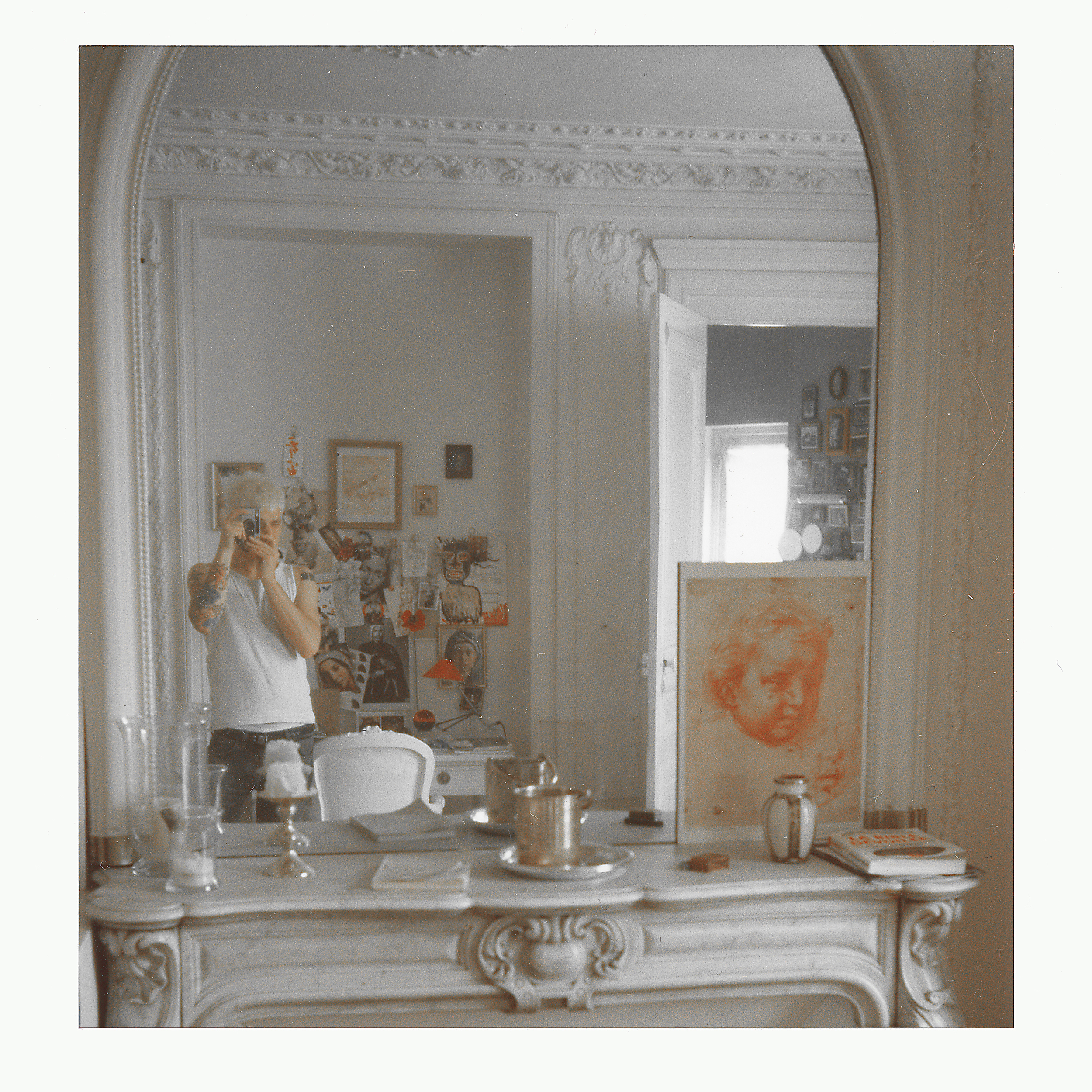

Background information
- Origin: Sweden
- Instruments: Vocals, guitar, bass, piano, synthesizer/modular, drums, percussion
- Years active: 1998–present
- Label: Vex (Vinyl Export) INF (Information) Ghostly International Smalltown Supersound Service
- Website: atelje.com

Dan Lissvik (born 1978) is a Swedish visual artist (MFA at Valand Academy School of Fine Arts), musician and producer known for founding the Balearic music project Studio as well as co-founding the Gothenburg-based Service record label.

== Music ==
In 1998, Dan Lissvik and Kristofer Ström (of Ljudbilden och Piloten) founded Alé, an instrumental band based in Malmö, Sweden. Joined by Magnus Granbom on bass and Jesper Nordblad on guitar, they recorded an untitled, full-length live album on cassette in 1999. After a series of live performances throughout the spring and summer of 1999, Alé disbanded when Lissvik moved to Gothenburg to pursue an MFA at the Valand Academy. Ström and Nordblad later formed Lemko Hall and commemorated the brief yet memorable summer of Alé’s music with a song called "Ode to Alé."

"In 1999–2000, Dan Lissvik continued recording music at the Valand School of Fine Arts and launched a new project called Studio. Shortly after, he met Ola Borgström, and together, they decided to start a DIY label, Service, to release his music, produce T-shirts, and organize events.

Later that year, Lissvik returned to Malmö to write and record The End of Fame with his former bandmates Nordblad (piano) and Ström. In 2001, this recording, featuring an added guitar solo by newly added member Rasmus Hägg, became the first 7" release by Studio on Service Records in 2001.

Both Studio and Service officially launched in 2001 with a series of 7" singles that combined new wave-influenced indie rock with elements of Afrobeat, dub, and Krautrock.

In 2005, Lissvik and Studio parted ways with Service to form INF (Information). In 2006, Studio released a 12" single (INF001 No Comply) and later that year, their debut full-length album, West Coast (INF002), on the newly formed label. The album featured six expansive, richly textured slow-disco tracks that conjured the feel of New Order lounging in Ibiza. West Coast was a major critical success, appearing on numerous year-end best-of lists.

Dan Lissvik has since produced albums and singles for a variety of international and Swedish pop and indie artists, including Taken by Trees, The Embassy, CEO, Lake Heartbeat, and the Canadian group Young Galaxy. A prolific remixer, he has reworked tracks for artists such as Karin Dreijer's Fever Ray, Foals, HAIM, Two Door Cinema Club, The 1975, World Champion, Tove Styrke, Sally Shapiro, Korallreven, La Roux, and more.

In 2014, Lissvik began a new project called Atelje and released an experimental downtempo album titled Meditation on VEX (Vinyl Export). In 2015, Lissvik released a neo-disco single titled Shuvit! on the Smalltown Supersound label, followed by his full-length debut for the label, Midnight, in 2016.

In 2021, Henric Claesson and Dan Lissvik formed the group Under Allt, releasing their debut album, Mellanrum, later that year. In 2023, Under Allt added Albin Johansson as a member and released their second full-length album, 3. In the summer of 2024, Atelje (Dan Lissvik) released three digital singles on Bandcamp.

== Projects/Bands, Record Labels ==
Years active	Project	Type	Role/Roles	Instruments
1998–1999	Alé	Music / Band	co-Founder, producer, arranger	Drums / Percussion
2000–2010	Studio	Music project	Founder, Writer, Producer, Arranger, Mix, Master, Artwork	Vocals/Guitar/Bass/Piano/Drums
2001–2005	Service	Record Label	co-Founder, Creator, Artwork, A&R	–
2002–2005	Hot Service	Music Club	co-Founder, Creator, Organizer	–
2005–2010	Information	Record Label	Founder, Creator, Artwork, A&R	–
2007–present	Dan Lissvik	Music / Solo	Founder, Writer, Producer, Arranger, Mix, Master, Artwork	Guitar/Bass/Piano/Drums
2014–present	Atelje	Music / Solo	Founder, Writer, Producer, Arranger, Mix, Master, Artwork	Vocals/Guitar/Bass/Piano/Drums
2014–present	Vex	Record Label	Founder, Creator, Artwork, A&R	–
2021–present	Under Allt	Music / Band	co-Founder, Writer, Producer, Arranger, Mix, Artwork	Guitar/Bass/Drums/Percussion

== Artworks ==
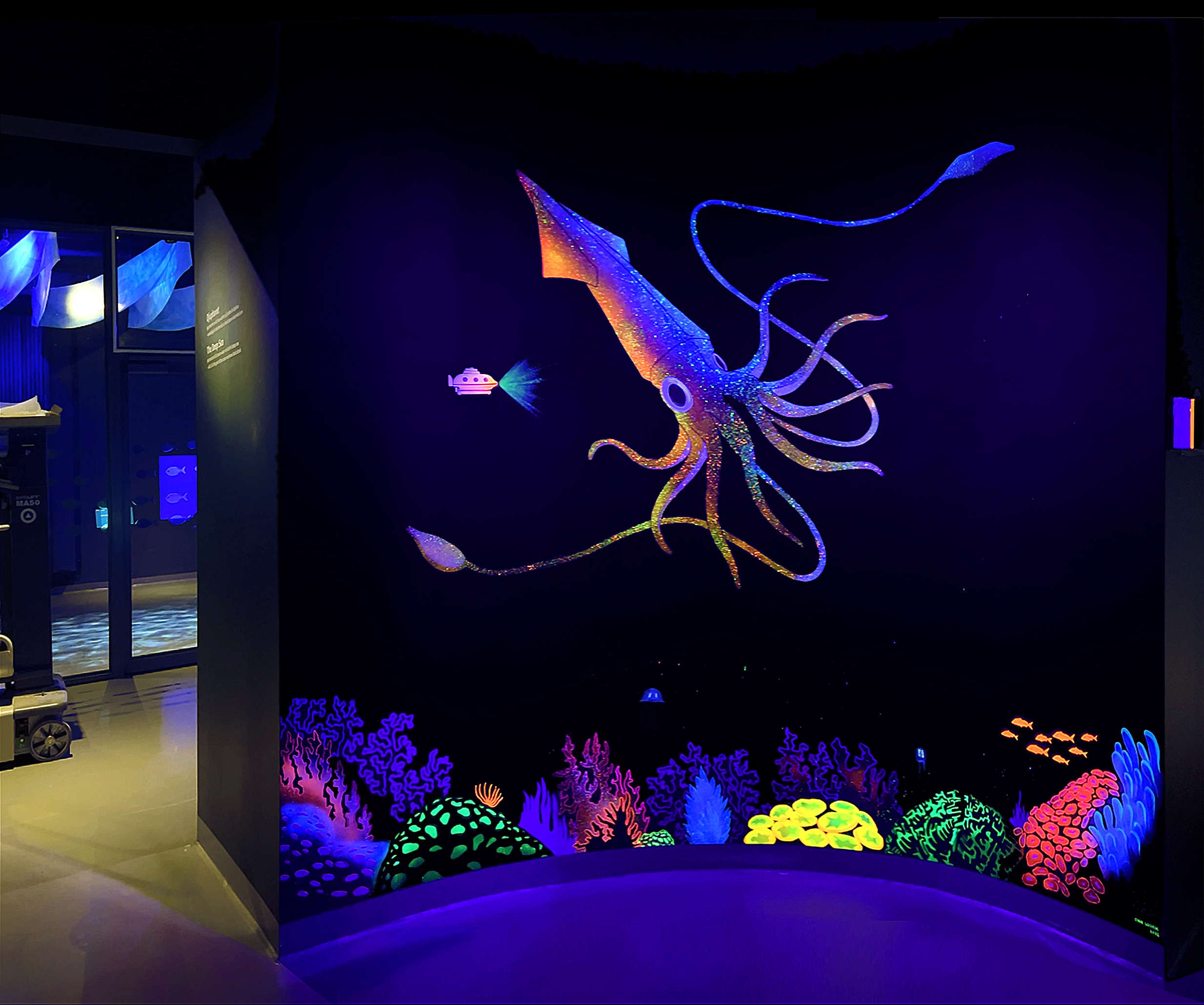
"Deep Search" Mural UV-painting for Sjöfartsmuseet Akvariet, Gothenburg

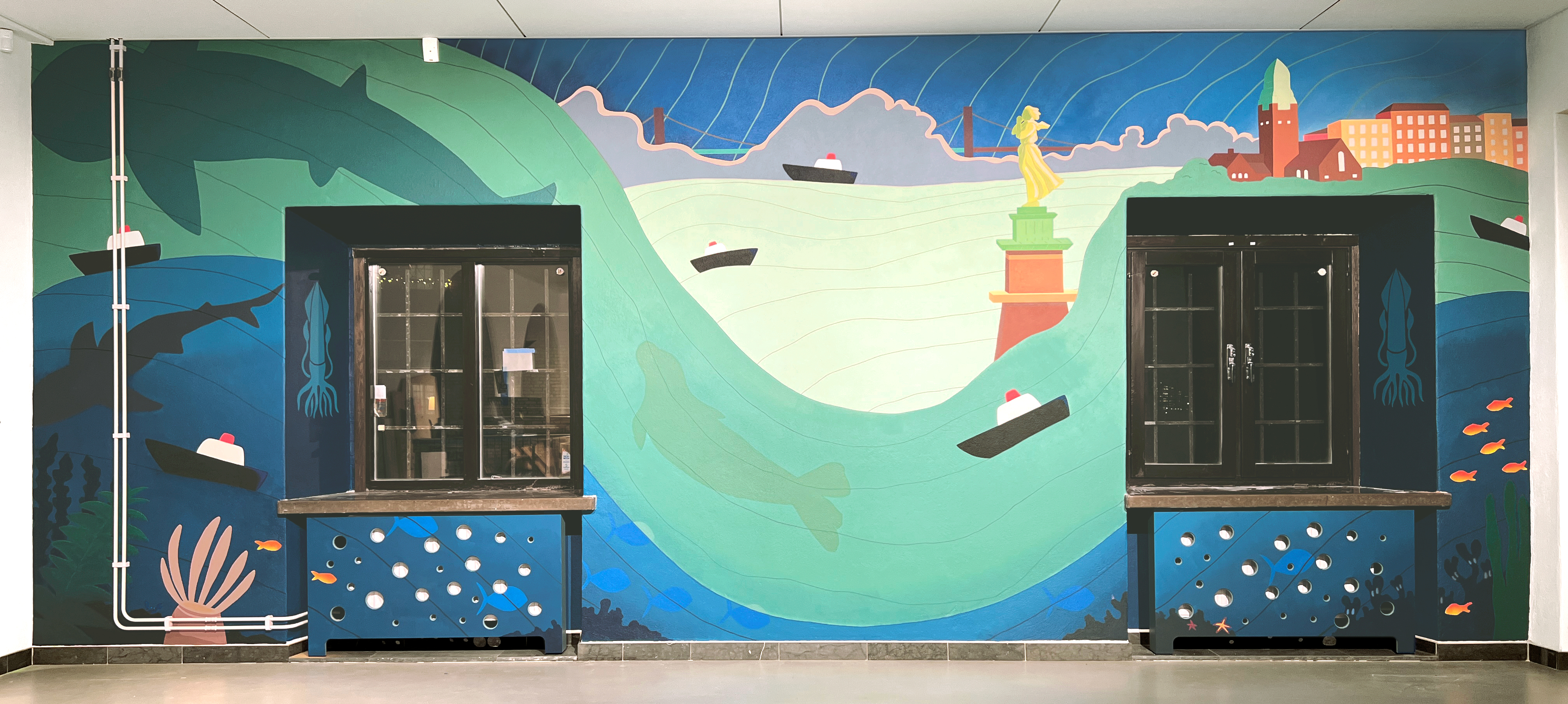
"West Coast" Mural painting for Sjöfartsmuseet Akvariet, Gothenburg

=== Artwork works ===
Year	Title	Artwork	Measurements	Location	Notes	Refs
2021		Decor Painting for "Grejen med Göteborg" Exhibition		Museum of Gothenburg		
2022	"Deep Search"	Mural UV-Painting	350 x 300 cm	Aquarium, Sjöfartsmuseet Akvariet, Gothenburg		
2022	"West Coast"	Mural Painting	700 x 300 cm	Entrance, Sjöfartsmuseet Akvariet, Gothenburg		
2022		Decor Painting for "Hav av Historier"		Sjöfartsmuseet Akvariet, Göteborg		

=== Exhibitions ===
Year	Title	Type	Location	Notes	Refs
2019		Solo	Folk / Gothenburg 2020		
2019		Solo	Bar Brillo / Stockholm		
2020		Solo	Templet / Gothenburg		
2020		Group	FF Projects / Los Angeles		
2021	Artist Talk, Our Sky Red Exhibition		Göteborgs Konsthall	Recording Production	
2022	Nina Bondesson Qalam		Göteborgs Konsthall	Music and Recording Production	
2022	Nina Bondesson Artist Talk		Göteborgs Konsthall	Music and Recording Production	
2023		Group	Hall Gallery / Gothenburg		
2024			Göteborgs Konsthall	Sound piece, Zheng Bo	
2024		Group	FF Projects / Los Angeles		

== Discography ==
=== Writer, producer, mix, master ===
Year	Artist	Title	Type	Writer	Producer	Mixer	Master	Notes	Refs
2001	Studio	"The End of Fame"	Single	Yes	Yes	Co-mixer		7"	
2002	Studio	"The Jungle"	Single	Co-writer	Yes	Co-mixer		7"	
2002	Studio	"Down Here Like You"	Single	Yes	Yes	Co-mixer		7"	
2006	Studio	"No Comply"	Single	Yes	Yes	Yes	Yes	12"	
2006	Studio	West Coast	LP	Co-writer	Yes	Yes	Yes		
2007	Studio	"West Side"	Single	Yes	Yes	Yes		7"	
2007	Studio	West Coast (2nd edition)	Double LP	Co-writer	Yes	Yes			
2007	Studio	Yearbook 1	LP	Co-writer	Yes	Yes			
2008	Studio	Yearbook 2	LP	Co-writer	Yes	Yes			
2008	The Embassy	"State '08"	Single	Co-writer	Yes	Yes		12"	
2008	Most Valuable Players	"Some Nerve"	Single		Co-producer	Yes		12"	
2008	Parlour	Frak session	LP				Yes		
2008	Dan Lissvik	7 Trx + intermission	LP	Yes	Yes	Yes			
2009	Taken By Trees	East of Eden	LP		Yes	Yes			
2009	The Crêpes	What Else?	LP	Co-writer	Yes	Yes			
2009	Lake Heartbeat	Trust in Numbers	LP		Yes	Yes			
2010	Parlour	Parlour No2	EP				Yes		
2010	Ikons	Ikons	LP		Yes	Yes			
2011	Young Galaxy	Shapeshifting	EP	Co-writer	Yes	Yes			
2012	Hanna	Lioness	EP	Co-writer	Yes	Yes			
2012	The Mary Onettes	Love Forever	EP		Yes	Yes			
2013	The Mary Onettes	Hit The Waves	LP		Yes	Co-mixer			
2013	Young Galaxy	Ultramarine	EP	Co-writer	Yes	Yes			
2013	Parlour	Parlour No3	EP				Yes		
2014	Anton Klint	Spritzer Ep	EP		Co-producer	Yes			
2014	ceo	Wonderland	LP		Co-producer	Co-mixer			
2014	Atelje	Meditation	LP	Yes	Yes	Yes			
2015	Young Galaxy	Falsework	LP	Co-writer	Yes	Yes			
2015	Dan Lissvik	"Shuvit!"	Single	Yes	Yes	Yes		12"	
2015	Anton Klint	Drunch	EP		Co-producer	Yes		12"	
2015	Anton Klint	"Personalmöte / Efter Stängning"	Single		Co-producer	Yes		7"	
2016	Dan Lissvik	"Backside"	Single	Yes	Yes	Yes		7"	
2016	Dan Lissvik	Midnight	LP	Yes	Yes	Yes	Yes		
2017	Atelje	50/50 Ep	EP	Yes	Yes	Yes	Yes		
2018	Young Galaxy	Down Time	LP		Co-producer	Co-mixer			
2018	Taken By Trees	Yellow To Blue	LP		Co-producer	Co-mixer	Co-producer		
2018	Dan Lissvik	Archive 1	LP	Yes	Yes	Yes	Yes		
2021	Under Allt	Mellanrum	LP	Co-writer	Yes	Yes			
2023	Under Allt	3	LP	Co-writer	Co-producer	Co-mixer			
2024	Atelje	"Manual"	Single	Yes	Yes	Yes			
2024	Atelje	"Passing Clouds"	Single	Yes	Yes	Yes	Yes		
2024	Atelje	"Daydream"	Single	Yes	Yes	Yes	Yes		
	Average	Average Ep	EP				Pre-master		
	Alé	Untitled Lp	LP	Co-writer	Co-producer				

=== Remixes ===
Remix year	Title	Original artist	Notes	Refs
2008	"Brown Piano (Remake by Studio)"	A Mountain of One	On Studio's Yearbook 2	
2008	Shout Out Louds	"Possible (Version By Studio)"	On Studio's Yearbook 2	
2008	Rubies	"A Room Without A Key (Version By Studio)"	On Studio's Yearbook 2	
2008	Love is All	"Turn The Radio Off (Remake By Studio)"	On Studio's Yearbook 2	
2008	Brennan Green	"Escape From Chinatown (Version By Studio)"	On Studio's Yearbook 2	
2008	Kylie Minogue	"2 Hearts (Version By Studio)"	On Studio's Yearbook 2	
2008	Williams	"Love on a Real Train (Version By Studio)"	On Studio's Yearbook 2	
2008	The Little Ones	"Morning Tide (Studio Remix)"	On Studio's Yearbook 2	
2008	Fontän	"Early Morning (Version by Studio)"	On Studio's Yearbook 2	
2009	Windsurf	"Bird of Paradise (Version by Studio)"		
2009	Fever Ray	"When I Grow Up (Lissvik Remix)"		
2009	This Is Head	"0002 (Dan Lissvik Remix)"		
2010	Bear in Heaven	"You Do You (Studio Remix)"		
2010	Steve Mason	"Am I Just A Man (Studio Remix)"		
2010	Mock & Toof	"Shoeshine Boogie (Dan Lissvik Remix)"		
2010	Joe Worricker	"Bobby Blue (Lissvik Remix)"		
2010	James Yuill	"First in Line (Lissvik Remix)"		
2010	Korallreven	"Honey Mine (Lissvik Remix)"		
2010	Cocknbullkid	"Hold On To Your Misery (Lissvik Remix V1)"		
2010	Architeq	"Odyssey (Dan Lissvik Long Version)"		
2010	Foals	"Miami (Lissvik Remix)"		
2011	Arp	"Pastoral Symphony (Studio Remix)"		
2011	Tiedye	"Fisherman's Bend (D. Lissvik Remix)"		
2011	ceo	"Illuminata (D Lissvik Remix)"		
2011	Det Vackra Livet	"Viljan (Lissvik Remix)"		
2011	Serenades	"Birds (Lissvik Remix)"		
2011	Andreas Mattsson	"Parklands (Dan Lissvik Remix)"		
2011	Foster The People	"Helena Beat (Lissvik Remix)"		
2012	Mungolian Jetset	"We Are The Shining (Dan Lissvik Version)"		
2012	Samling	"Stackars Lilla Varsting (D. Lissvik Remix)"		
2012	Architecture in Helsinki	"Desert Island (Lissvik Remix)"		
2012	Haim	"Forever (Dan Lissvik Remix)"		
2012	Chad Valley	"Fall 4 U (Lissvik Remix)"		
2013	Sally Shapiro	"If It Doesn't Rain (Dan Lissvik Remix)"		
2013	Haim	"Send Me Down (Dan Lissvik Remix)"		
2013	Two Door Cinema Club	"Sun (Lissvik Remix)"		
2013	Say Lou Lou	"Julian (Lissvik Remix)"		
2013	Shout Out Louds	"Walking in Your Footsteps (Lissvik Remix)"		
2013	NONONO	"Like The Wind (D. Lissvik Remix)"		
2013	Young Galaxy	"Privileged Poor (Lissvik Remix)"		
2013	HAERTS	"All The Days (Lissvik Remix)"		
2013	INVSN	"Down The Shadows (Lissvik Remix)"		
2013	Lawrence Rothman	"Montauk Fling (Lissvik Remix)"		
2013	Fiction	"Be Clear (Lissvik Remix)"		
2014	Polly Scattergood	"Subsequently Lost (Lissvik Remix)"		
2014	The 1975	"Settle Down (Dan Lissvik Remix)"		
2014	Brian Reitzell	"Last Summer (Lissvik Remix)"		
2014	Sister	"The War Is Over (Lissviks Lullaby)"		
2014	Nottee	"Fire (D. Lissvik Remix)"		
2014	Tove Styrke	"Borderline (Dan Lissvik Remix)"		
2015	Sakarias	"Bellagio (Lissvik Remix)"		
2015	Chris Olsson	"Thin Love (Lissvik Edit)"		
2015	Jonas Lundqvist	"Den som ser havet (Lissvik Remix)"		
2015	World Champion	"Avocado Galaxy (Lissvik Remix)"		
2018	Gundelach	"Garden (Dan Lissvik Remix)"		
2018	Henric Claes	"Good Morning (Lissvik Remix)"		
	Dimitrios K	"Forward Forward (Lissvik Remix)"		
