= Shapeshifting (Young Galaxy album) =

Studio album by Young Galaxy
- Released: February 8, 2011
- Recorded: 2010
- Genres: Synthpop, sophisti-pop, nu gaze
- Length: 42 mins.
- Label: Paper Bag Records
- Producer: Dan Lissvik

Young Galaxy chronology
Invisible Republic (2009)	Shapeshifting (2011)	Ultramarine (2013)

Shapeshifting is the third studio album by Young Galaxy, released on Paper Bag Records in February 2011. It was produced by Dan Lissvik of the Swedish duo Studio. Reviewed in Pitchfork, Andrew Gaerig called it the band's "finest record".

The album was named as a longlisted nominee for the 2011 Polaris Music Prize.

== Production ==
The album was recorded by the three-piece in Montreal, Quebec, Canada, then sent to Gothenburg, Sweden, where Lissvik reworked the material. The band and producer collaborated using Skype to communicate over the nine-month duration. The group's method to composing the songs was described by songwriter/singer/guitarist Stephen Ramsay as "[i]nstead of picking up a guitar and finding the most brilliant melody we could, we tried to erase the shape of the songs." The band moved away from traditional verse-chorus structures towards a more "impressionistic" approach. Songs were written by Ramsay and McCandless, with Stephen Kamp playing bass.

== Style ==
The album is described as a departure from their previous recording, Invisible Republic. Lissvik's more electronic-oriented roots resulted in "dance-inflected pop", as opposed to their more dream pop style on earlier records. Although Ramsay and McCandless share vocal duties on the recording, Shapeshifting sees singer/keyboardist Catherine McCandless moving into more of a "lead-singer role".

== Critical reception ==
Professional ratings
Aggregate scores
Source	Rating
Metacritic	79/100
Review scores
Source	Rating
AllMusic	4.5/5 stars
Consequence of Sound	B
Now	4/5 stars
Paste	(7/10)
Pitchfork	7.6/10
Resident Advisor	4.0/5
Slant Magazine	3.5/5 stars

Shapeshifting was met with "generally favorable" reviews from critics. At Metacritic, which assigns a weighted average rating out of 100 to reviews from mainstream publications, this release received an average score of 79, based on 11 reviews.

== Video ==
Animated videos for "We Have Everything" and "Peripheral Visionaries" were produced by Los Angeles-based animator Sinbad Richardson. Both videos made part of the official selection of the Fest Anča animated film festival in Žilina, Slovakia.

== Track listing ==
1. "Nth"
2. "The Angels Are Surely Weeping"
3. "Blown Minded"
4. "We Have Everything"
5. "For Dear Life"
6. "Peripheral Visionaries"
7. "High and Goodbye"
8. "Phantoms"
9. "Cover Your Tracks"
10. "B.S.E."
11. "Shapeshifting"

== Formats ==
Released on compact disc and in MP3 format, the LP was also released in limited-run, 180-gram white and blue-marble vinyl editions.
