= The Drifter E.P. =

EP by Lindi Ortega
- Released: 23 September 2008 (iTunes); 17 March 2009 (CD)
- Genre: Folk, rock
- Length: 13:35
- Label: Cherrytree Records
- Producer: Ron Lopata

Lindi Ortega chronology
Lindi Ortega (EP) (2008)	The Drifter E.P. (2008)	Little Red Boots (2011)

Professional ratings
Review scores
Source	Rating
VueWeekly	3/5 stars
Feminist Review	(positive)
EyeWeekly.com	4/5 stars
URChicago.com	4/5 stars

The Drifter E.P. is the second EP of 2008 from Lindi Ortega and was released on iTunes on 23 September 2008 and on CD on 17 March 2009.

Unlike her previous releases, this EP is almost exclusively Lindi and her guitar. The title track, Drifter, was recorded on an answering machine. Lindi wanted to play a new song for her A&R rep so she called him and played it on his answering machine. He was so impressed he decided to include it on the EP, taking it straight from his answering machine.

== Track list ==
All tracks written by Lindi Ortega unless otherwise noted.

No.	Title	Writer(s)	Length
1.	"Dying Of Another Broken Heart"		2:56
2.	"All My Friends (Live from the Vocal Booth)"		2:36
3.	"Black Fly"	Lindi Ortega, Ron Lopata, Simon Wilcox	3:52
4.	"Drifter (Phone Message)" on iTunes "Drifter (answering machine)" on the CD"		4:14

== Personnel ==
- Lindi Ortega - vocals, guitar, piano
