= Metz (album) =

METZ

Studio album by Metz
- Released: October 9, 2012
- Studios: The Barn Window Studio; The Dream House
- Genres: Punk rock; hardcore punk; noise rock; grunge
- Length: 29:44
- Label: Sub Pop
- Producer: Metz

Metz chronology
METZ (2012)	II (2015)

METZ is the debut studio album by Canadian punk rock band Metz. It was released on October 9, 2012, via Sub Pop Records. The recording sessions took place at The Barn Window Studio and at The Dream House. The album was produced by the band.

It was a shortlisted nominee for the 2013 Polaris Music Prize.

== Musical style ==
METZ's musical style has been described as hardcore punk and noise rock. NME compared the album's sound to early 90s grunge. With respect to specific artists and albums, critics have cited the Jesus Lizard, the Sonics, Jawbox, Drive Like Jehu and Nirvana's Bleach as influences.

== Critical reception ==
Professional ratings
Aggregate scores
Source	Rating
AnyDecentMusic?	7.9/10
Metacritic	82/100
Review scores
Source	Rating
AllMusic	3/5 stars
The A.V. Club	A
Beats per Minute	79%
Consequence of Sound	4/5 stars
Drowned in Sound	8/10
God Is in the TV	4.5/5
MusicOMH	4.5/5 stars
NME	8/10
Pitchfork	8.5/10
PopMatters	9/10

METZ was met with universal acclaim from music critics. At Metacritic, which assigns a normalized rating out of 100 to reviews from mainstream publications, the album received an average score of 82, based on twenty-three reviews. The aggregator AnyDecentMusic? has the critical consensus of the album at a 7.9 out of 10, based on eighteen reviews.

Jason Heller of The A.V. Club gave the album an A grade, writing "for all its abrasion and denatured noise, Metz isn't a statement of nihilism or finality; it's a bright, exploratory scalpel making the first of hopefully many incisions". Sam Shepherd of musicOMH found the album "sounds fresh despite having its roots firmly planted in the post-hardcore/pre-grunge era". Gary Suarez of PopMatters praised the album, writing "METZ shines brightly, like a Molotov cocktail at the moment of impact". Stuart Berman of Pitchfork gave the album a 'Best New Music' designation, stating "there's a surface graininess that amplifies the corrosive qualities of the band's sound and the strep-throat rawness of Edkins' voice, but also serves to accentuate some of the more surprising elements in the mix". Dan Caffrey of Consequence resumes: "on record, they bring a sharpened tune-smithery to their noise-punk". J.R. Moores of Drowned in Sound wrote: "Metz make you want to rock and then roll and then rock a bit more. By the end of this album's 30 boisterous minutes you'll feel absolutely exhausted". Jazz Monroe of NME found the album delivers "the same righteous anger that informed much of their favourite music in the early '90s". Brendan Frank of Beats per Minute wrote: "the sonic corruption and disquieting sense of dread are accomplished with pure muscle alone. But instead of keeping this mindset out in the open, Metz just sweat it out over thirty jarring minutes".

In his mixed review for AllMusic, Jason Lymangrover wrote that "the Toronto trio is just a ball of heavy genres, lumping together noise rock, post-punk, hardcore, no wave, or any style that might punish a pair of eardrums".

=== Accolades ===
Accolades for METZ
Publication	Accolade	Rank	Ref.
Alternative Press	AP's 10 Essential albums of 2012	5	
Consequence	Top 50 Albums of 2012	27	
Exclaim!	Exclaim!'s Best Albums of 2012: Top 50 Albums of the Year	15	
NME	50 Best Albums Of 2012	35	
Pitchfork	The Top 50 Albums of 2012	44	
PopMatters	The 75 Best Albums Of 2012	43	

== Track listing ==
No.	Title	Length
1.	"Headache"	2:18
2.	"Get Off"	2:22
3.	"Sad Pricks"	2:51
4.	"Rats"	3:05
5.	"Knife in the Water"	2:12
6.	"Nausea"	1:05
7.	"Wet Blanket"	3:53
8.	"Wasted"	4:07
9.	"The Mule"	2:24
10.	"Negative Space"	3:22
11.	"--))--"	2:05
Total length:		29:44

Note

- Track 11 is a hidden track. "Negative Space" ends at 3:22; at 4:15 "--))--" begins. Total duration of the combined track 10 is 5:28.

== Personnel ==
- METZ — songwriters, producers
  - Alex Edkins
  - Hayden Menzies
  - Chris Slorach
- Alex Bonenfant — mixing (tracks: 1, 3–5, 7, 8)
- Graham Walsh — mixing (tracks: 2, 9, 10)
- Roger Seibel — mastering
- Jeff Kleinsmith — design
- John Edkins — cover photo
- Jeremy R. Jansen — additional photography
- Ivy Lovell — additional photography

== Charts ==
Chart (2012)	Peak position
UK Record Store Chart (OCC)	40
