= Metz (band) =

Canadian punk rock band

METZ
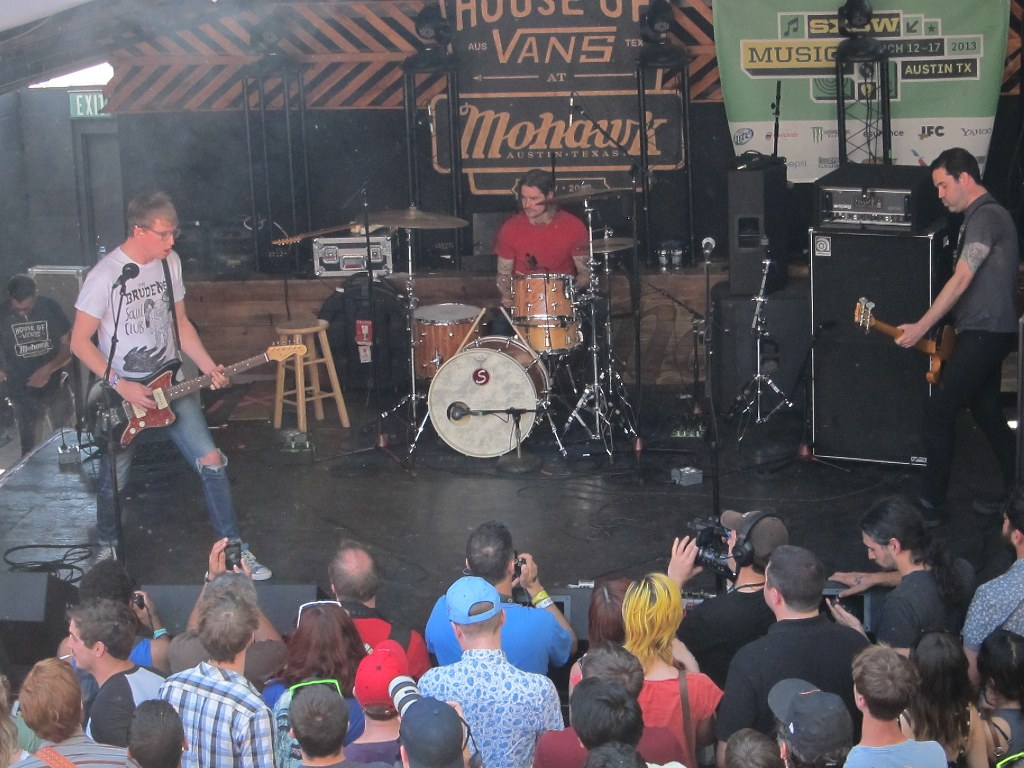
- METZ performing at SXSW in 2013

Background information
- Origin: Ottawa, Ontario, Canada
- Genres: Noise punk; hardcore punk; post-hardcore; post-punk
- Years active: 2007–2024; 2025 (on hiatus)
- Labels: Sub Pop, Royal Mountain, Three One G, Swami Records
- Members: Alex Edkins; Hayden Menzies; Chris Slorach
- Past members: Chuck Saso
- Website: www.metzztem.com

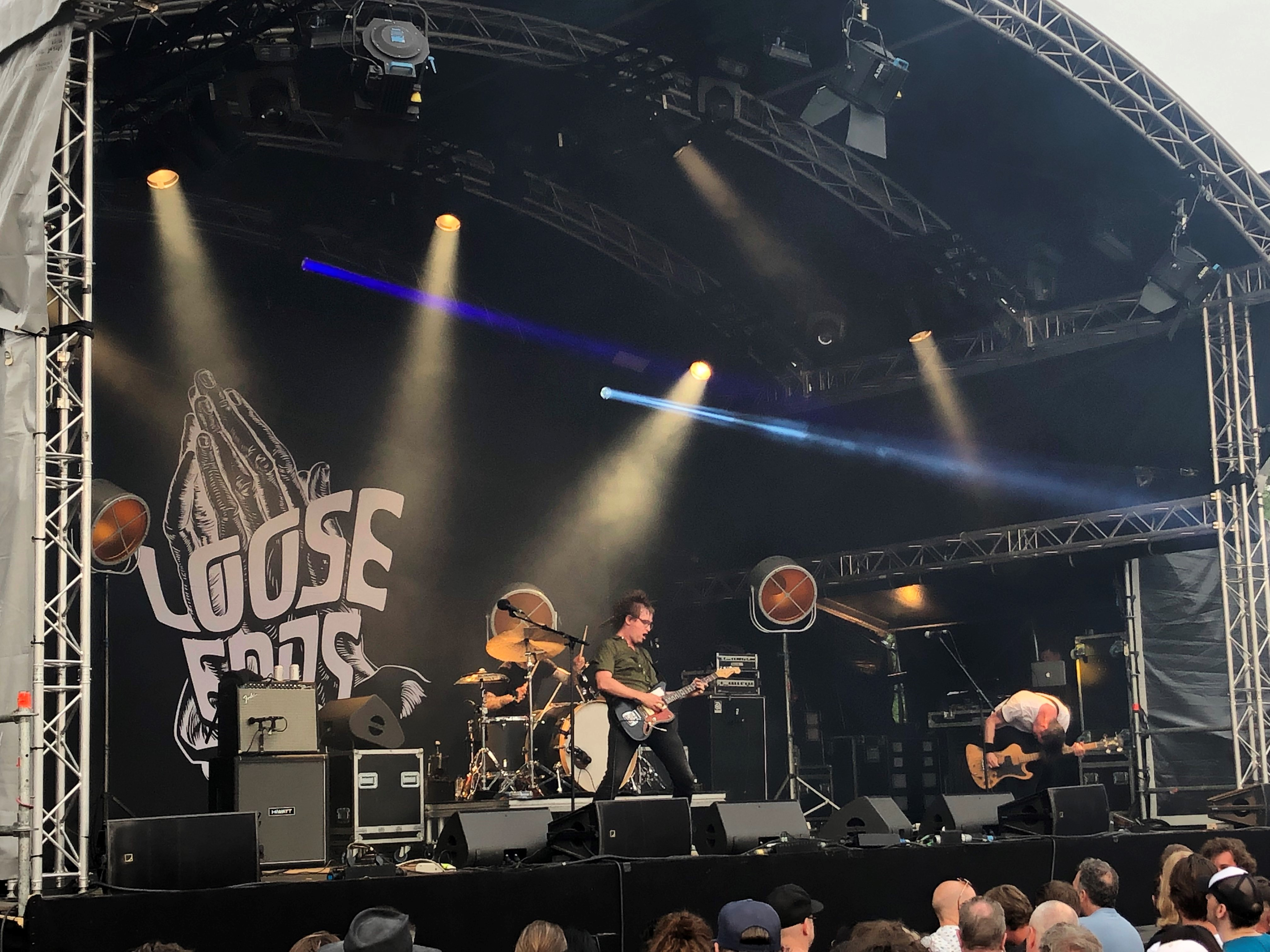
METZ performing at Loose Ends festival in Amsterdam in 2019

METZ (official capitalization) is a Canadian punk rock band formed in 2007 in Ottawa, and currently based in Toronto. The band consists of guitarist and vocalist Alex Edkins, bassist Chris Slorach and drummer Hayden Menzies. In an interview with Austin, Texas zine The Cosmic Clash, Edkins has labeled METZ's style as punk rock, "at the core."

== History ==
METZ was formed in Ottawa, Ontario, in 2007 by guitarist/vocalist Alex Edkins and drummer Hayden Menzies, two longtime friends soon joined by Chuck Saso on bass. After a year of working on material, Edkins and Menzies decided to move Toronto, while Saso stayed in Ottawa. In Toronto they found their new bassist, Chris Slorach.

METZ released their eponymous debut album on the Sub Pop label in 2012. The album was named on the 2013 Polaris Music Prize long list. The band performed a "homecoming show" at Lee's Palace in Toronto that year.

On February 17, 2015, the band announced a new album, II, with the release of the album's first track, "Acetate", and an accompanying music video; the album was released May 5, 2015, in North America and the previous day elsewhere. II was a long-listed nominee for the 2015 Polaris Music Prize.

In May 2017, METZ announced their third studio album, Strange Peace, recorded by Steve Albini, which was released on September 22, 2017.

Drummer Hayden Menzies has a degree in fine art from Concordia University and designs the artwork for the band.

In July 2020, METZ announced that their fourth studio album, Atlas Vending, would arrive on October 9 via Sub Pop.

On February 14, 2024, METZ announced their fifth album Up On Gravity Hill. The album was released on April 12 followed by a tour. On October 10, 2024, the band announced an indefinite hiatus to take time to focus on other endeavors and enjoy more time at home with family. The band played its final show of the tour on November 29, 2024 at Village Underground in London, UK.

On April 23, 2025, METZ made a surprise reunion appearance on Everybody's Live with John Mulaney.

== Influences ==
METZ have cited several artists as influences, including Mclusky, Nirvana, Slayer, Metallica, New Order, Mission of Burma, Soundgarden, Sonic Youth, Wipers, Wool, Drive Like Jehu, Hoover, Shotmaker, Beatles, INXS, the Cramps, Charlie Megira, Santo & Johnny, Joy Division, the Kinks, Oranssi Pazuzu, the Pretty Things, Fugazi, the Stooges, the Jesus and Mary Chain, the Seeds, Fela Kuti and Devo.

== Band members ==
=== Current members ===
- Alex Edkins – guitars, vocals (2007–2024; 2025)
- Hayden Menzies – drums (2007–2024; 2025)
- Chris Slorach – bass (2008–2024; 2025)

=== Former members ===
- Chuck Saso – bass (2007–2008)

== Discography ==
=== Studio albums ===
- METZ (2012, Sub Pop)
- II (2015, Sub Pop)
- Strange Peace (2017, Sub Pop)
- Atlas Vending (2020, Sub Pop)
- Up on Gravity Hill (2024, Sub Pop / Dine Alone)

=== Compilation albums ===
- Automat (July 12, 2019, Sub Pop)

=== Live albums ===
- Live At Ramsgate Music Hall (July 3, 2020, Bandcamp Download Only Release)
- Live at the Opera House (August 4, 2021, Sub Pop)

=== Singles ===
- "Soft Whiteout" / "Lump Sums" (January 13, 2009, We Are Busy Bodies)
- "Ripped On The Fence" / "Dry Up" (June 9, 2009, We Are Busy Bodies)
- "Negative Space" / "Automat" (August 10, 2010, We Are Busy Bodies)
- Metz / Fresh Snow - "Pig" / "BMX Based Tactics" (April 21, 2012, The Sonic Boom Recording Co. / Sub Pop) - "Pig" is a Sparklehorse cover
- "Pig" (April 21, 2012, The Sonic Boom Recording Co. / Sub Pop)
- "Dirty Shirt" (October 8, 2012, Sub Pop)
- Polaris Prize 2013 (2013, Scion Sessions / Sub Pop)
- "Wait In Line" Promo (November 13, 2015, Sub Pop)
- "Can't Understand" (December 4, 2015, Adult Swim / Sub Pop)
- "Eraser" (January 22, 2016, Sub Pop)
- Metz / Swami John Reis - "Let It Rust" / "Caught Up" (April 16, 2016, Swami Records / Sub Pop)
- Metz / Mission Of Burma - "Good, Not Great" / "Get Off" (April 16, 2016, Sub Pop)
- "Acid" / "Slow Decay" (March 12, 2021, Sub Pop)
- Metz / Adulkt Life (March 4, 2022, Sup Pop)
