= Young Galaxy (album) =

Studio album by Young Galaxy
- Released: April 2007
- Recorded: early 2005 – mid-2006 Breakglass Studios, Montreal
- Genre: Indie pop
- Label: Arts & Crafts
- Producers: Jace Lasek, Stephen Ramsay

Young Galaxy chronology
Young Galaxy (2007)	Invisible Republic (2009)

Professional ratings
Review scores
Source	Rating
AllMusic	2.5/5 stars
NME	(7/10)
NOW	3/5 stars
Pitchfork	(6.3/10)
Prefix	(4.5/10)

Young Galaxy is the 2007 debut album by the band Young Galaxy. It features a shoegaze sound similar to that of Luna or early Slowdive.

== Track listing ==
All songs were written by Stephen Ramsay and Catherine McCandless, except as noted.

1. "Swing Your Heartache"
2. "No Matter How Hard You Try" (Ramsay)
3. "Outside the City"
4. "Lazy Religion"
5. "Wailing Wall" (Ramsay)
6. "The Sun's Coming Up and My Plane's Going Down" (Ramsay)
7. "Searchlight" (Ramsay)
8. "Lost in the Call"
9. "Come and See"
10. "Embers"
11. "The Alchemy Between Us" (Ramsay)
