= Atlas Vending =

Studio album by Metz
- Released: October 9, 2020
- Length: 40:17
- Label: Sub Pop
- Producer: Ben Greenberg; Metz

Metz chronology
| Strange Peace (2017) | Atlas Vending (2020) | Up on Gravity Hill (2024) |

Atlas Vending is the fourth studio album by Canadian punk rock band Metz. It was released on October 9, 2020, via Sub Pop. The album was produced by Ben Greenberg and METZ.

== Critical reception ==
Professional ratings
Aggregate scores
| Source | Rating |
|---|---|
| AnyDecentMusic? | 7.6/10 |
| Metacritic | 80/100 |
Review scores
| Source | Rating |
| AllMusic | 4/5 stars |
| Beats Per Minute | 77% |
| DIY | 4/5 stars |
| Gigwise | 7/10 stars |
| Kerrang! | 4/5 |
| The Line of Best Fit | 7/10 |
| Loud and Quiet | 8/10 |
| Pitchfork | 6.4/10 |
| Spectrum Culture | (71%) |
| Under the Radar | 8/10 stars |

Atlas Vending was met with generally favorable reviews from music critics. At Metacritic, which assigns a normalized rating out of 100 to reviews from mainstream publications, the album received an average score of 80 based on twelve reviews. The aggregator AnyDecentMusic? has the critical consensus of the album at a 7.6 out of 10, based on fourteen reviews.

== Track listing ==
All tracks are written by Alex Edkins, Chris Slorach and Hayden Menzies.

| No. | Title | Length |
|---|---|---|
| 1. | "Pulse" | 4:21 |
| 2. | "Blind Youth Industrial Park" | 3:01 |
| 3. | "The Mirror" | 5:02 |
| 4. | "No Ceiling" | 1:36 |
| 5. | "Hail Taxi" | 4:31 |
| 6. | "Draw Us In" | 3:56 |
| 7. | "Sugar Pill" | 2:55 |
| 8. | "Framed by the Comet's Tail" | 4:52 |
| 9. | "Parasite" | 2:24 |
| 10. | "A Boat to Drown In" | 7:39 |
| Total length: | | 40:17 |

== Personnel ==
- Alex Edkins – lyrics, vocals, guitar, songwriter, producer, additional recording, design, layout
- Chris Slorach – bass, songwriter, producer, design, layout
- Hayden Menzies – drums, songwriter, producer, design, layout
- Ben Greenberg – producer
- Seth Manchester – engineering, mixing
- Matt Colton – mastering
- David Konopka – design, layout
- Jeff Kleinsmith – cover design
- John Edkins – cover photography
- Nicholas Sayers – additional photography

== Charts ==
| Chart (2020) | Peak position |
|---|---|
| UK Independent Albums (OCC) | 32 |
| US Top Album Sales (Billboard) | 69 |
| US Current Album Sales (Billboard) | 38 |
