= Two Thousand and Ten Injuries =

Studio album by Love Is All
- Released: 23 March 2010
- Genre: Indie pop
- Length: 34:15
- Label: Polyvinyl Record Co.

Love Is All chronology
A Hundred Things Keep Me Up at Night (2008)	Two Thousand and Ten Injuries (2010)

Two Thousand and Ten Injuries is the third studio album from Swedish indie-pop group Love Is All, released on 23 March 2010 on the Polyvinyl Record Co. label.

== Track listing ==
Professional ratings
Aggregate scores
Source	Rating
Metacritic	74/100
Review scores
Source	Rating
AllMusic	4/5 stars
Drowned in Sound	8/10
MSN Music (Consumer Guide)	A−
Pitchfork	(8.0/10)
PopMatters	6/10 stars
Punknews.org	3.5/5 stars
Spin	4/5 stars

1. "Bigger Bolder" – 2:54
2. "Repetition" – 2:31
3. "Never Now" – 3:26
4. "Less Than Thrilled" – 2:16
5. "Early Warnings" – 2:37
6. "False Pretense" – 2:43
7. "The Birds Were Singing With All Their Might" – 3:30
8. "Again, Again" – 1:55
9. "Kungen" – 2:46
10. "A Side in a Bed" – 3:28
11. "Dust" – 3:00
12. "Take Your Time" – 3:05

== Credits ==
Production

- Love Is All and Wyatt Cusick
