= A Hundred Things Keep Me Up at Night =

Studio album by Love Is All
- Released: 11 November 2008
- Genre: Indie pop
- Length: 32:51
- Label: What's Your Rupture?

Love Is All chronology
Nine Times That Same Song (2005)	A Hundred Things Keep Me Up at Night (2008)	Two Thousand and Ten Injuries (2010)

Professional ratings
Aggregate scores
Source	Rating
Metacritic	78/100
Review scores
Source	Rating
Allmusic	4/5 stars
Drowned In Sound	7/10
Dusted	4/5 stars
NME	3.5/5 stars
Now Magazine	4/5 stars
Pitchfork	8.1/10
Popmatters	8/10
Robert Christgau	A−
Rolling Stone	3/5 stars
Spin	3.5/5 stars

A Hundred Things Keep Me Up at Night is the second studio album from Swedish indie-pop group Love Is All.

== Critical reception ==
A Hundred Things Keep Me Up at Night was met with "generally favorable" reviews from critics. At Metacritic, which assigns a weighted average rating out of 100 to reviews from mainstream publications, this release received an average score of 78, based on 18 reviews.

== Track listing ==
No.	Title	Length
1.	"New Beginnings"	2:54
2.	"Give It Back"	3:17
3.	"Movie Romance"	2:31
4.	"Last Choice"	2:28
5.	"Sea Sick"	3:42
6.	"Wishing Well"	2:44
7.	"When Giants Fall"	3:37
8.	"Rumours"	3:07
9.	"Big Bangs, Black Holes, Meteorites"	1:52
10.	"A More Uncertain Future"	2:52
11.	"19 Floors"	3:47
