= Up on Gravity Hill =

Studio album by Metz
- Released: April 12, 2024
- Genre: Noise rock
- Length: 34:45
- Label: Sub Pop
- Producer: Metz

Metz chronology
Atlas Vending (2020)	Up on Gravity Hill (2024)

Up on Gravity Hill is the fifth studio album by Canadian band Metz. It was released on April 12, 2024, through Sub Pop. Produced by the band, it features vocal contributions from Amber Webber on the final track. It is the last album the band released before going on an indefinite hiatus.

== Critical reception ==
Professional ratings
Aggregate scores
Source	Rating
Metacritic	84/100
Review scores
Source	Rating
AllMusic	4.5/5 stars
Clash	8/10
DIY	4/5 stars
Exclaim!	8/10
Far Out	4/5 stars
PopMatters	8/10
Spectrum Culture	75/100%
Uncut	7/10

Up on Gravity Hill was met with universal acclaim from music critics. At Metacritic, which assigns a normalized rating out of 100 to reviews from mainstream publications, the album received an average score of 84, based on seven reviews.

AllMusic's Mark Deming praised the album, calling it "a significant step forward for a group that already was doing mighty work, and it suggests any number of places they could take their talents next. Anyone who doubts Metz are one of North America's best bands needs to hear Up on Gravity Hill and find out what they've been missing". Joshua Khan of Clash found the album "most confident record so far and a deafening reminder that art wasn't designed to adhere to paint-by-numbers standards – it's meant to bend until it breaks into something new". Alex Doyle of DIY wrote: "perhaps best of all is how direct the whole thing is, typified by "Glass Eye", on which the outfit's uncompromising sound brings sonic clarity while sporadic backing vocals offer classic '90s boyband echoes. A solid record". Madison Ryan of Exclaim! resumed: "clocking in at only 35 minutes—though it feels longer, richer—Up on Gravity Hill is a quick glimpse into a more earnest Metz. This doesn't sound like a band experimenting with something new, but rather a group of musicians secure enough in their craft to humbly evolve with increasingly uncertain times". Brian Stout of PopMatters concluded: "this has been a particularly strong year for heavy, guitar-forward music, and Up on Gravity Hill is sure to turn up again on some end-of-the-year lists". Wyndham Wallace of Uncut wrote: "Metz's latest combines the Jesus Lizard's Goat-era aggression with PiL's Album-era rigour".

== Track listing ==
All tracks are written by Alex Edkins, Chris Slorach and Hayden Menzies.

Up on Gravity Hill track listing
No.	Title	Length
1.	"No Reservation / Love Comes Crashing"	6:31
2.	"Glass Eye"	3:33
3.	"Entwined (Street Light Buzz)"	4:32
4.	"99"	3:19
5.	"Superior Mirage"	4:02
6.	"Wound Tight"	3:26
7.	"Never Still Again"	4:12
8.	"Light Your Way Home" (featuring Amber Webber)	5:10
Total length:		34:45

== Personnel ==
- Metz – songwriters, producers, design, layout
  - Alex Edkins – vocals, guitar, additional recording
  - Chris Slorach – bass
  - Hayden Menzies – drums
- Amber Webber – vocals (track 8)
- Owen Pallett – strings arrangement
- Seth Manchester – engineering, mixing
- Graham Walsh – additional engineering
- Matt Colton – mastering
- Sara Cwynar – cover
- Jeff Kleinsmith – design, layout
- John Edkins – sleeve photo

== Charts ==
Chart performance for Up on Gravity Hill
Chart (2024)	Peak position
UK Album Downloads (OCC)	77
