= Liberty (Lindi Ortega album) =

Studio album by Lindi Ortega
- Released: March 30, 2018
- Studio: Battle Tapes Studio, Nashville, Tennessee
- Genre: Country
- Length: 46:10
- Label: Shadowbox
- Producer: Lindi Ortega; Skylar Wilson

Lindi Ortega chronology
Faded Gloryville (2015)	Liberty (2018)	From the Ether (2024)

Professional ratings
Aggregate scores
Source	Rating
Metacritic	77/100
Review scores
Source	Rating
AllMusic	4/5 stars
American Songwriter	4/5 stars
Exclaim!	9/10
MusicOMH	3.5/5 stars
Pitchfork	7.4/10

Liberty is the fifth studio album by Canadian musician Lindi Ortega. It was released on March 30, 2018 under Shadowbox Records.

== Critical reception ==
Liberty was met with "generally favourable" reviews from critics. At Metacritic, which assigns a weighted average rating out of 100 to reviews from mainstream publications, this release received an average score of 77, based on 7 reviews. Aggregator Album of the Year gave the release a 79 out of 100 based on a critical consensus of 6 reviews.

== Track listing ==
No.	Title	Writer(s)	Length
1.	"Through the Dust, Pt. I"		1:27
2.	"Afraid of the Dark"		4:03
3.	"You Ain't Foolin' Me"		4:34
4.	"Til My Dyin' Day"		3:01
5.	"Nothing Is Impossible"		2:43
6.	"Through the Dust, Pt. II"		1:07
7.	"The Comeback Kid"		3:01
8.	"Darkness Be Gone"		3:52
9.	"Forever Blue"		3:44
10.	"In the Clear"		4:02
11.	"Pablo"		4:21
12.	"Lovers in Love"		3:08
13.	"Through the Dust, Pt. III"		1:08
14.	"Liberty"		3:09
15.	"Gracias a la Vida"	Violeta Parra	3:06

== Personnel ==
Musician

- Lindi Ortega – primary artist
- Savannah Conley – backing vocals
- Charlie McCoy – harmonica
- Jeremy Fetzer – guitar
- Jon Radford – drums
- Mike Rinne – bass
- Leif Shires – trumpet

Production

- Jeremy Ferguson – engineer
- Graham Waks – engineer
- Skylar Wilson – producer
- Jordan Lehning – mixing
- Sangwook Nam – mastering

== Charts ==
Chart performance for Liberty
Chart (2018)	Peak position
US Heatseekers Albums (Billboard)	13
US Independent Albums (Billboard)	35
