= Under the Radar (magazine) =

American music magazine

- Editor: Mark Redfern
- Categories: Music
- Frequency: Four issues per year
- Publisher: Wendy Lynch Redfern and Mark Redfern
- Founded: 2001; 25 years ago
- Based in: Lexington, Virginia, United States
- Language: English
- Website: undertheradarmag.com
- ISSN: 1553-2305

Under the Radar is an American music magazine that features interviews with accompanying photo-shoots. Each issue includes opinion and commentary of the indie music scene as well as reviews of books, DVDs, and albums. The magazine posts web-exclusive interviews and reviews on its website.

Items are reviewed based on a rating system in which each album, book, and DVD receives a rating from 1 to 10. The magazine has been in publication since late 2001 and is issued three times per year.

The magazine was founded by co-publishers (and husband and wife) Mark Redfern and Wendy Lynch Redfern, who currently run the magazine. Mark is the magazine's Senior Editor and writes many of the magazine's articles. Wendy is the Creative Director and lays out each issue. She is also a music photographer and conducts photo-shoots for the magazine, including many of its covers.

== Contents ==
It was the first American magazine to interview the following non-American bands: the Aliens, the Besnard Lakes, the Dears, the Duke Spirit, the Earlies, Editors, the Go! Team, Hope of the States, iLiKETRAiNS, I'm from Barcelona, the Long Blondes, Los Campesinos!, Love Is All, Lucky Soul, Mew, Mugison, Mystery Jets, the Pipettes, the Research, Serena-Maneesh, the Sleepy Jackson, Taken by Trees, the Thrills, and Young Galaxy. It was also the first print magazine to interview Vampire Weekend and Fleet Foxes.

Photographers who have shot for the magazine include: Crackerfarm, Wendy Lynch Redfern, Ray Lego, Koury Angelo, Ian Maddox, James Loveday, Autumn de Wilde, and David Redfern.

=== Issues ===
Under the Radar has had 72 print magazine issues since its debut in December 2001.

- Issue 1: Grandaddy (Dec 2001)
- Issue 2: The Divine Comedy (Jul 2002)
- Issue 3: The Flaming Lips (Oct 2002)
- Issue 4: Elliott Smith (Mar 2003)
- Issue 5: Black Rebel Motorcycle Club (Oct 2003)
- Issue 6: Rilo Kiley (Jul 2004)
- Issue 7: Interpol (Protest Issue) [Oct 2004]
- Issue 8: Bright Eyes (Jan 2005)
- Issue 9: Super Furry Animals (Mar 2005)
- Issue 10: Death Cab for Cutie (Jul 2005)
- Issue 11: O Canada! (Oct 2005)
- Issue 12: Belle and Sebastian (Jan 2006)
- Issue 13: The Raconteurs (Mar 2006)
- Issue 14: The Dears (Jul 2006)
- Issue 15: The Decemberists (Oct 2006)
- Issue 16: Modest Mouse (Jan 2007)
- Issue 17: Feist (Mar 2007)
- Issue 18: Tegan and Sara (Jul 2007)
- Issue 19: Beirut (Oct 2007)
- Issue 20: She & Him (Jan 2008)
- Issue 21: Flight of the Conchords (Mar 2008)
- Issue 22: Colin Meloy, Chris Walla, and Britt Daniel (Protest Issue) [Jul 2008]
- Issue 23: Jenny Lewis (Oct 2008)
- Issue 24: Meric Long, Robin Pecknold, and Ezra Koenig (Dec 2008)
- Issue 25: Grizzly Bear (Feb 2009)
- Issue 26: Bat for Lashes (Apr 2009)
- Issue 27: Jarvis Cocker (Jul 2009)
- Issue 28: Monsters of Folk (Sep 2009)
- Issue 29: Ben Gibbard, Kevin Barnes, Devendra Banhart, Jenny Lewis, and Bradford Cox (Dec 2009)
- Issue 30: Vampire Weekend (Mar 2010)
- Issue 31: Joanna Newsom (May 2010)
- Issue 32: Matt Berninger (Jul 2010)
- Issue 33: Interpol (Oct 2010)
- Issue 34: Sufjan Stevens (Dec 2010)
- Issue 35: Death Cab for Cutie (Feb 2011)
- Issue 36: Aziz Ansari (May 2011)
- Issue 37: St. Vincent (Jul 2011)
- Issue 38: Robin Pecknold and Joanna Newsom (Oct 2011)
- Issue 39: Faris Badwan, M83, and Bon Iver (Jan 2012)
- Issue 40: Ed Droste, David Longstreth, and Twin Shadow (Mar 2012)
- Issue 41: Yeasayer (May 2012)
- Issue 42: Tegan and Sara and Dan Deacon (Protest Issue) [Aug 2012]
- Issue 43: Animal Collective (Nov 2012)
- Issue 44: Grimes (Jan 2013)
- Issue 45: Phoenix (Mar 2013)
- Issue 46: Charli XCX (Jun 2013)
- Issue 47: MGMT (Sep 2013)
- Issue 48: HAIM (Nov 2013)
- Issue 49: Fred Armisen and Carrie Brownstein (Feb 2014)
- Issue 50: Future Islands (May 2014)
- Issue 51: alt-J (Sep 2014)
- Issue 52: St. Vincent (Dec 2014)
- Issue 53: Tame Impala (Apr 2015)
- Issue 54: CHVRCHES (Aug 2015)
- Issue 55: EL VY (Nov 2015)
- Issue 56: Father John Misty and Wolf Alice (Jan 2016)
- Issue 57: M83 (May 2016)
- Issue 58: Amanda Palmer (Protest Issue) [Sep 2016]
- Issue 59: The Flaming Lips (Dec 2016)
- Issue 60: Father John Misty (Apr 2017)
- Issue 61: Grizzly Bear (Jul 2017)
- Issue 62: Julien Baker (Oct 2017)
- Issue 63: Courtney Barnett (Mar 2018)
- Issue 64: Kamasi Washington (Aug 2018)
- Issue 65: Mitski and boygenius (Mar 2019)
- Issue 66: Angel Olsen and Sleater-Kinney (Sep 2019)
- Issue 67: Phoebe Bridgers and Moses Sumney (Sep 2020)
- Issue 68: Japanese Breakfast and HAIM (Protest Issue) (Apr 2021)
- Issue 69: 20th Anniversary Issue (Dec 2021)
- Issue 70: Sharon Van Etten and Ezra Furman (Nov 2022)
- Issue 71: Weyes Blood and Black Belt Eagle Scout (Apr 2023)
- Issue 72: The Cardigans and Thurston Moore (Apr 2024)

== Special issues and features ==
Issue 10, the Summer 2005 issue, featured the Britpop: A Decade On special section. The section featured new interviews with key members of mid-1990s Britpop bands.

For Issue 11, the Fall 2005 issue, Under the Radar ran a big 36-page special section on Canadian indie rock. The section included interviews with Canadian bands.

In Issue 17, the Spring 2007 issue, Under the Radar ran a 15-page special section entitled Music vs. Film. For the section, British band Kaiser Chiefs interviewed comedian/actor/writer Simon Pegg and Kevin Drew of the Canadian collective Broken Social Scene interviewed Irish actor Cillian Murphy. The section also included an interview with singer/actress Charlotte Gainsbourg. In addition, various bands wrote about their favorite movies.

For Issue 29, the Winter 2009 issue, included a Best of the Decade section, where a Top 200 Albums of the Decade list was featured.

Issue 36, the Spring 2011 issue, featured a special section entitled Music vs. Comedy, which featured interviews between music artists and comedians.

Issue 38, the Fall 2011 issue, celebrated the 10th anniversary of the magazine's debut. It featured an extensive interview between Robin Pecknold of Fleet Foxes and Joanna Newsom, along with new interviews with the artists that graced the cover of the first six editions. The magazine then celebrated its 15th anniversary with Issue 59, the Winter 2016 edition.

Issue 66, the Fall 2019 issue, featured a section entitled My Favorite Album, where many artists (including the Flaming Lips, Slowdive, Wilco, and many more) talk about their all-time favorite album.

=== Elliott Smith's last interview ===
In 2003, Mark Redfern and writer Marcus Kagler interviewed acclaimed singer/songwriter Elliott Smith for an Under the Radar cover story and Wendy Lynch photographed him for the cover. It was the first interview that Smith had done in a couple of years and at the time he was hard at work on his album From a Basement on the Hill. Elliott Smith killed himself later that year and the Under the Radar feature ended up being Smith's last interview and photo-shoot.

=== The Protest Issue ===
In 2004 and 2008, coinciding with the U.S. presidential elections, Under the Radar put together special "Protest Issue." In addition to politically themed articles, bands were photographed with self-made protest signs and the photos ran in the issue. The autographed protest signs were later auctioned off on eBay, with all the profits donated to the political action group Music for America. This trend continued for both the 2012 and 2016 U.S. presidential elections. The latest Protest Issue was released in 2021 and features Japanese Breakfast and HAIM on the covers.

U.S. political magazine The Nation named Under the Radar the Most Valuable Music Magazine in their 2016 Progressive Honor Roll.

=== Chris Walla Explains It All ===
From issue 7, 2004 through issue 22, 2008's editions of "The Protest issue", Death Cab for Cutie guitarist and indie rock producer Chris Walla has written a regular column for Under the Radar entitled "Chris Walla Explains It All".

=== Versus ===
From time to time, Under the Radar has a special feature where a current musician interviews for the magazine a musician whom they admire and who has influenced them. Versus features have included: Clinic vs. Can, Devendra Banhart vs. Donovan, the Dresden Dolls vs. Bauhaus, Love Is All vs. the Vaselines, Primal Scream vs. the Cramps, and the Thrills vs. Brian Wilson.

== In popular culture ==
A fictitious cover of Under the Radar magazine makes an appearance in the 2019 Oscar-winning film Sound of Metal.

== Awards ==
The magazine has been nominated as the Plug Awards "Magazine of the Year" three times.
