= Ultramarine (album) =

Studio album by Young Galaxy
- Released: April 23, 2013
- Recorded: 2012
- Genre: Synthpop; Balearic beat
- Length: 39:51
- Label: Paper Bag
- Producer: Dan Lissvik

Young Galaxy chronology
Shapeshifting (2011)	Ultramarine (2013)	Falsework (2015)

Professional ratings
Aggregate scores
Source	Rating
Metacritic	75/100
Review scores
Source	Rating
Allmusic	4/5 stars
Now Magazine	4/5 stars
Pitchfork	7.8/10

Ultramarine is the fourth studio album by Young Galaxy, released in April 2013. As with their previous album, it was produced by Dan Lissvik and was released on Paper Bag Records.

The album was named a longlisted nominee for the 2013 Polaris Music Prize on June 13, 2013, and named to the short list on July 16, 2013.

== Track listing ==
No.	Title	Length
1.	"Pretty Boy"	3:56
2.	"Fall for You"	4:23
3.	"New Summer"	4:12
4.	"Fever"	2:58
5.	"Hard to Tell"	4:37
6.	"What We Want"	3:57
7.	"Out the Gate Backwards"	4:10
8.	"In Fire"	4:29
9.	"Privileged Poor"	3:13
10.	"Sleepwalk with Me"	3:57
