= Nine Times That Same Song =

Studio album by Love Is All
- Released: January 2006
- Genres: Indie pop, lo-fi
- Length: 31:02
- Label: What's Your Rupture?

Love Is All chronology
Felt Tip EP (2005)	Nine Times That Same Song (2006)	A Hundred Things Keep Me Up at Night (2008)

Nine Times That Same Song is the debut studio album by Swedish indie pop group Love Is All. It was released by the independent record label What's Your Rupture? in January 2006.

== Reception ==
Professional ratings
Review scores
Source	Rating
AllMusic	4/5 stars
The Guardian	3/5 stars
MusicOMH	4/5 stars
NME	7/10
Pitchfork	8.7/10
PopMatters	9/10
Rolling Stone	3.5/5 stars
The Skinny	4/5 stars
Spin	A−
The Village Voice	A−

Online music magazine Pitchfork named Nine Times That Same Song the 16th best album of 2005 and placed it at number 139 on their list of the top 200 albums of the 2000s.

== Track listing ==
1. "Talk Talk Talk Talk" – 2:50
2. "Ageing Had Never Been His Friend" – 2:45
3. "Turn the Radio Off" – 3:55
4. "Used Goods" – 2:20
5. "Busy Doing Nothing" – 3:25
6. "Make Out Fall Out Make Up" – 3:02
7. "Felt Tip" – 4:18
8. "Spinning and Scratching" – 3:05
9. "Turn the TV Off" – 3:25
10. "Trying Too Hard" – 1:57

== Band members ==
- Johan Lindwall – bass, backing vocals
- Markus Görsch – drums, backing vocals, percussion
- Nicholaus Sparding – guitar, vocals, keys
- Fredrik Eriksson – saxophone, backing vocals, keys, percussion
- Josephine Olausson – vocals, keyboard, percussion
