= Little Red Boots =

Studio album by Lindi Ortega
- Released: 7 June 2011
- Genre: Country
- Length: 40:37
- Label: Last Gang Records
- Producer: Ron Lopata

Lindi Ortega chronology
The Drifter E.P. (2008)	Little Red Boots (2011)	Cigarettes & Truckstops (2012)

Little Red Boots is the third studio album by Lindi Ortega, released in 2011. Music videos were shot for "Little Lie" (June 2011) and "Black Fly" (October 2011).

== Reception ==
The album debuted at #99 on the Canadian Albums Chart.

The album was nominated for Roots & Traditional Album: Solo in the 2012 Juno Awards.

The album was named as a longlisted nominee for the 2012 Polaris Music Prize on June 14, 2012.

== Track list ==
All tracks written by Lindi Ortega unless otherwise noted.

No.	Title	Writer(s)	Length
1.	"Little Lie"		2:27
2.	"When All the Stars Align"		3:50
3.	"Blue Bird"		2:19
4.	"Angels"		3:24
5.	"I'm No Elvis Presley"		2:19
6.	"Little Red Boots"		3:32
7.	"Dying of Another Broken Heart"		2:56
8.	"All My Friends"		2:47
9.	"Fall Down Or Fly"		4:09
10.	"Jimmy Dean"		3:35
11.	"Black Fly"	Lindi Ortega, Ron Lopata, Simon Wilcox	3:52
12.	"So Sad"		5:19
13.	"I'm on Fire (iTunes bonus track)"	Bruce Springsteen	2:28
