= Lindi Ortega =

Canadian musician

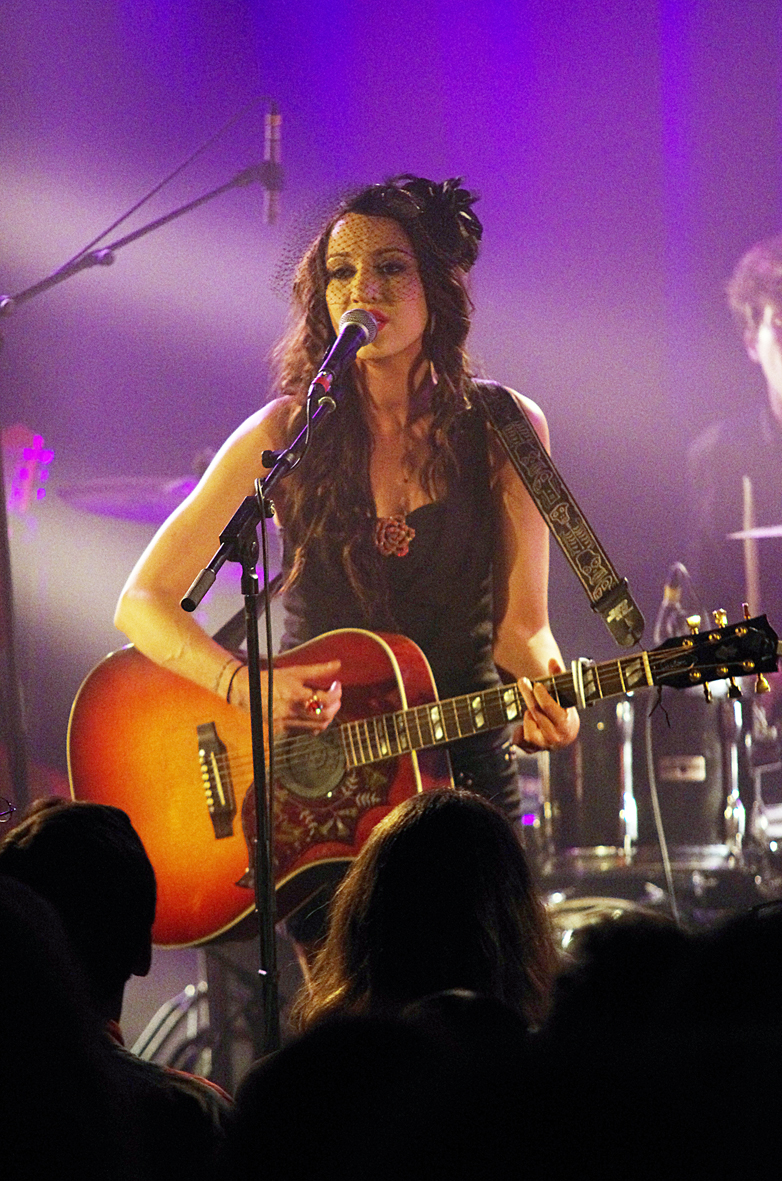
- Ortega performing in Paris, France; February 24, 2012

Background information
- Born: May 28, 1979 (age 47); Toronto, Ontario, Canada
- Origin: Nashville, Tennessee, U.S.
- Genre: Country
- Occupations: Musician, songwriter
- Instruments: Vocals, guitar, piano
- Years active: 2000–present
- Label: Shadowbox Music
- Website: lindiortega.ca

Lindi Marie Ortega (born May 28, 1979) is a Canadian country singer-songwriter from Toronto, Ontario, who had lived in Nashville, Tennessee then moved to Western Canada in 2017. She spent nearly a decade as an independent artist in the Toronto music scene, releasing two albums and an EP in that time. She has been described as "Toronto's best kept secret" and nicknamed "Indie Lindi". Ortega left Last Gang management and records in November 2017. She has since released Til The Goin' Gets Gone EP and her full-length Liberty on her own label Shadowbox Music. Her voice has been described as a blend of Dolly Parton's, Johnny Cash's, and Emmylou Harris'.

At the end of 2010 and beginning of 2011, Ortega toured extensively as a backup singer for Brandon Flowers, the lead singer of the Killers, in support of his solo album, Flamingo. The tour included dates in the United States, the United Kingdom, Germany, France, Italy, Spain and Mexico, as well as televised live performances on The Tonight Show with Jay Leno, Jimmy Kimmel Live!, Later... with Jools Holland and at Abbey Road Studios. There were also a number of festival dates in the United States and Europe, including Coachella, T in the Park and Oxegen.

On February 7, 2012, Ortega was nominated for two Juno Awards – New Artist of the Year and Roots & Traditional Album: Solo.

On June 14, 2012, Ortega's album Little Red Boots was named as a longlisted nominee for the 2012 Polaris Music Prize. In June 2013, her album Cigarettes & Truckstops was longlisted for the 2013 Polaris Music Prize.

In July 2014, Ortega was nominated for two Canadian Country Music Association Awards – Female Artist of the Year and Roots Artist of the Year. Her album, Tin Star was also nominated for Album Design of the Year.

== Personal life and career beginnings ==
Lindi Ortega was born on May 28, 1979 and is from Toronto, Ontario, Canada. She is of Mexican-Irish descent. She was 17 when – after picking up the guitar that hung on the wall of the family home – she wrote "Faded Dress", which she has said was "the first in a long line of heartbreak songs". It was about her first boyfriend dumping her the day before the prom. "I wrote about the dress hanging in the closet, that never got worn. It was sad, but I thought it would be better the next year. But nobody asked me."

Ortega spent years trawling around record labels as the Toronto scene dubbed her "Indie Lindi". In 2008, she signed to major label Interscope, releasing one EP before they directed their resources into something more conventionally radio-friendly. Ortega remembers "singing my heart out for suits with BlackBerries. Your emotions are all over the place – and they're staring at the ceiling."

After a decade of making ends meet by working in pizza places and fleamarkets, in 2011, she signed to Last Gang.

In 2017, Ortega married Daniel Huscroft. They divorced in July 2023.

On May 18, 2026 Ortega announced her engagement to Geronimo Morris via Instagram.

In 2018, Ortega revealed that she has suffered from body dysmorphic disorder.

== Charity work ==
A self-described bird lover, Ortega organised and was the featured performer at a benefit concert for the World Parrot Refuge in Coombs, British Columbia on March 3, 2010. The concert was held at The Supermarket in Toronto and featured a collection of local musicians that included Sara Kamin, Mandippal Jandu, The Framework, Emma-Lee, The DoneFors, and Dylan Murray.

== Albums ==
=== The Taste of Forbidden Fruit ===
Ortega's debut album, The Taste of Forbidden Fruit, was released in 2001. In her review of the album, Coreen Wolanski of Exclaim! described Ortega's voice as "the closest thing to vocal perfection" she had heard in a long time. CBC Radio 3 described the album as follows:

Lindi seasons her musical scores like a deranged chef whipping up a culinary creation. A dash of country, a pinch of folk, a sprinkle of rock, and a smidgeon of jazz! Last but not least, to add a little spice, how about some vaudeville cabaret? No, this is not a textbook recipe, but rather a mystical scribbling from an ancient scroll. Lindi is enigmatic and enchanting with a voice that can be cheeky and brassy or haunting and ghostly. Her music derives from the metaphysical in a sphere that warps time and defies orthodoxy. This madness is a pure passion that has never met the technicalities of music theory.

The song Nothing at All from this album was used in the online campaign for the Dove Campaign for Real Beauty.

=== Fall from Grace ===
In late 2005 Ortega began advertising her new album as coming in the autumn of 2006 having declared, "People kept pushing and prodding and finally I saw the light". Fall From Grace was released on February 6, 2007. In reviewing the album Oxyfication.com described Fall From Grace as "the quintessential album of the trials, tribulations, and triumphs of life as an indie singer."

=== EPs ===
In 2007 Ortega collaborated with Juno Award winning producer Ron Lopata on "I Need", a song for the compilation album Year of the Monkey – 68. Lopata has since produced Ortega's two EPs and occasionally tours with her as her keyboardist. Ortega's eponymous EP was initially sold at concerts and on March 5, 2008 was made available online from independent music retailer killthe8.com. When the initial run sold out the EP was discontinued. After being signed to Cherrytree Records / Interscope Records in August 2008 Ortega released her second EP, The Drifter E.P., to critical success. Ortega then began an extensive touring schedule which included touring with Noah & the Whale in the autumn of 2008, performing at the 2009 SXSW festival in Austin, TX in March, and opening for Kevin Costner & The Modern West's tour in July. In September 2009 Ortega performed on a cross-Canada tour as opening act for Keane's North American tour. After the success of labelmate Lady Gaga, Cherrytree decided they would focus on dance / pop acts and Ortega signed with Last Gang Records.

=== Little Red Boots ===
Ortega announced on her blog that a new full-length album with Juno Award winning producer, Ron Lopata, would be released on June 7, 2011 on Last Gang. A release party was held at The Dakota Tavern in Toronto on June 6, 2011. The album and song, Little Red Boots, are named after her signature red boots that she got while on tour with Kevin Costner and his rock country band Modern West. The album received critical acclaim and was nominated for two Juno Awards as well as a place on the Polaris Music Prize Long List.

=== Cigarettes & Truckstops ===
In December 2011, Ortega moved to Nashville, TN where she began working with producer Colin Linden to record her album Cigarettes & Truckstops. The album was released on Last Gang Records on October 2, 2012. In support of this album, Ortega toured the United States and Canada, opening for Southern California punk legends Social Distortion. In June 2013, the album was longlisted for the 2013 Polaris Music Prize.

=== Tin Star ===
Ortega released her third album for Last Gang, Tin Star, on October 8, 2013. That same year she featured on Dean Brody's single "Bounty".

=== Faded Gloryville ===
Ortega released her fourth full-length album, Faded Gloryville, on Last Gang Records' imprint Grand Tour Records on August 7, 2015.

=== Liberty ===
Ortega released Liberty, her fifth full-length album, on Shadowbox Music on March 30, 2018.

== Discography ==
=== Studio albums ===
Title	Album details	Peak chart positions		
Title	Album details	US Heat	US Indie	US Country
The Taste of Forbidden Fruit	Release date: November 30, 2001; Label: Independent	—	—	—
Fall from Grace	Release date: August 13, 2007; Label: Independent	—	—	—
Little Red Boots	Release date: June 7, 2011; Label: Last Gang Records	27	—	—
Cigarettes & Truckstops	Release date: October 2, 2012; Label: Last Gang Records	42	—	71
Tin Star	Release date: October 8, 2013; Label: Last Gang Records	35	—	56
Faded Gloryville	Release date: August 7, 2015; Label: Last Gang Records	12	38	39
Liberty	Release date: March 30, 2018; Label: Shadowbox Music	13	28	48
From the Ether	Release date: October 18, 2024; Label: Shadowbox Music			
"—" denotes releases that did not chart

=== EPs ===
Title	Details
Lindi Ortega E.P.	Release date: 2008; Label: Independent
The Drifter E.P.	Release date: September 23, 2008; Label: Cherrytree Records/Interscope Records
Tennessee Christmas E.P.	Release date: November 21, 2011; Label: Last Gang Records
iTunes Session	Release date: June 17, 2014; Label: Last Gang Records
Til The Goin' Gets Gone	Release date: March 17, 2017; Label: Shadowbox Music

=== Compilations and soundtracks ===
Date of Release	Title	Song(s)	Label
2004	Maybe This Christmas Tree	Fairytale of New York (duet with Pilate)	Nettwerk
2005	The Surreal Gourmet – A Feast For Your Ears	Tomorrow You'll Say Goodbye	Warner Music Canada
2007	Year of the Monkey – 68	I Need	independent
2010	Major Lazer – Lazers Never Die EP	Good Enuff (Featuring Collie Budz & Lindi Ortega)	Interscope Records

=== Music videos ===
Year	Title	Director
2011	"Angels"	Lindi Ortega
2011	"Little Lie"	Margaret Malandruccolo
2011	"Black Fly"	Michael Maxxis
2011	"Christmas Eve with You"	David Foss Ricci
2012	"The Day You Die"	Ante Kovac
2012	"Cigarettes & Truckstops"	Lindi Ortega
2013	"Murder of Crows"	Lindi Ortega
2013	"Tin Star"	Michael Maxxis
2014	"Lived and Died Alone"	Jeth Weinrich
2015	"Ashes"	Lindi Ortega
2016	"Someday Soon"	
2017	"Waiting 'Round To Die"	Lindi Ortega
2018	"The Comeback Kid"	Andrey Sorokin
2018	"Liberty"	Travis Nicholson

== Awards and nominations ==
Year	Association	Category	Result
2011	2012 Polaris Music Prize	Polaris Music Prize Long List – Little Red Boots	Nominated
2012	2013 Polaris Music Prize	Polaris Music Prize Long List – Cigarettes & Truckstops	Nominated
2012	Juno Awards of 2012	New Artist of the Year	Nominated
2012	Juno Awards of 2012	Roots & Traditional Album of the Year – Solo – Little Red Boots	Nominated
2013	Canadian Country Music Association	Roots Artist or Group of the Year	Nominated
2014	Juno Awards of 2014	Roots & Traditional Album of the Year – Solo – Tin Star	Nominated
2014	Canadian Country Music Association	Roots Artist or Group of the Year	Won
2014	Canadian Country Music Association	Female Artist of the Year	Nominated
2014	Canadian Country Music Association	Album Design of the Year – Tin Star	Nominated
2015	Canadian Country Music Association	Roots Artist or Group of the Year	Won
2016	Canadian Country Music Association	Roots Artist or Group of the Year	Nominated
2017	Country Music Association of Ontario	Roots Artist or Group of the Year	Nominated
