= West Coast (album) =

Studio album by Studio
- Released: November 2006
- Recorded: 2002–2006
- Studio: Valand School of Fine Arts, Nordhemsgatan, Stena Terminal.
- Genre: Balearic beat
- Length: 55:09
- Label: Information
- Producer: Dan Lissvik

Studio chronology
West Coast (2006)	Yearbook 2 (2008)

Singles from West Coast
- 1. "Life's a Beach" Released: April 2007; 2. "West Side" Released: July 2007

West Coast is the debut studio album by the Swedish music project Studio. It was self-released in November 2006 on Studio's own record label Information (INF002). An expanded version of the album (a compilation of INF001 "No Comply" [single] and INF002 West Coast [LP]) was released on CD in 2007 as Yearbook 1.

== Critical reception ==
Professional ratings
West Coast
Review scores
Source	Rating
AllMusic	4/5 stars
The A.V. Club	B+
The Guardian	4/5 stars
Resident Advisor	4.0/5
Pitchfork	8.5/10

Professional ratings
Yearbook 1
Review scores
Source	Rating
AllMusic	4/5 stars
Pitchfork	8.3/10

Yearbook 1 was listed at 23 in Pitchfork's Top Albums of 2007 list. West Coast was listed at number 57 on Fact's Best Albums of the Decade list.

== Track listing ==
All tracks are written by Dan Lissvik and Rasmus Hägg.

West Coast
No.	Title	Lyrics	Length
1.	"Out There"		16:00
2.	"West Side"	Dan Lissvik	7:06
3.	"Self Service"	Dan Lissvik	4:13
4.	"Origin" (Renamed by Dan Lissvik. Originally released on Service in 2002, as "Shake You Down By The River".)	Rasmus Hägg	5:33
5.	"Life's a Beach"		12:49
6.	"Indo"		9:28
Total length:			55:09

Yearbook 1
No.	Title	Lyrics	Length
1.	"No Comply"	Dan Lissvik	5:40
2.	"Radio Edit"		9:51
3.	"Out There"		15:58
4.	"West Side"	Dan Lissvik	7:04
5.	"Self Service"	Dan Lissvik	4:11
6.	"Origin" (Renamed by Dan Lissvik. Originally released on Service in 2002, as "Shake You Down By The River".)	Rasmus Hägg	5:31
7.	"Life's a Beach"		12:47
8.	"Indo"		9:28
Total length:			1:10:30

== Charts ==
Chart (2007)	Peak position
Swedish Albums (Sverigetopplistan)	25
