= Strange Peace =

Studio album by Metz
- Released: September 22, 2017
- Studios: Electrical Audio (Chicago); The Woodshed (Toronto); Basketball 4 Life; The Nursery
- Genres: Noise rock; hardcore punk; alternative rock; post-punk
- Length: 36:07
- Label: Sub Pop
- Producer: Metz

Metz chronology
II (2015)	Strange Peace (2017)	Atlas Vending (2020)

Singles from Strange Peace
- 1. "Cellophane" Released: July 11, 2017; 2. "Drained Lake" Released: August 2, 2017; 3. "Mess of Wires" Released: August 22, 2017; 4. "Common Trash" Released: September 22, 2017; 5. "Escalator Teeth/On and On" Released: September 27, 2018

Strange Peace is the third studio album by Canadian noise rock three-piece band Metz. It was released on September 22, 2017, through Sub Pop. The live-to-tape recording sessions took place at Electrical Audio in Chicago with Steve Albini, at the Woodshed in Toronto and at Basketball 4 Life with Graham Walsh, and at the Nursery with member Alex Edkins. The album was produced by the band.

== Promotion and release ==
On July 11, 2017, the album was previewed with the release of the song "Cellophane" via streaming, along the way revealing the title of the album, its release date, track list, cover artwork and supporting tour. It was also revealed that the band have worked with Steve Albini, who provided live-to-tape recording of Strange Peace during four days at his Chicago-based studio Electrical Audio, which was booked for a week by the trio. On August 2, 2017, the group shared the second song from the album, "Drained Lake", for which an acompaying music video was released later in October 2017. The third promotional single from the album, "Mess of Wires", was released on August 22, 2017, also via streaming. The fourth and final promotional single, "Common Trash" was released in CDr format along with the album on September 22, 2017.

Celebrating 30 years of Sub Pop, the song "Escalator Teeth" b/w "On and On" was released as a part of 'SPF30 Singles Spectacular' series on September 27, 2018.

== Critical reception ==
Professional ratings
Aggregate scores
Source	Rating
AnyDecentMusic?	7.4/10
Metacritic	78/100
Review scores
Source	Rating
AllMusic	4/5 stars
The A.V. Club	B+
DIY	4/5 stars
Exclaim!	9/10
The Irish Times	4/5 stars
Mojo	3/5 stars
Paste	7.8/10
Pitchfork	7.6/10
Record Collector	3/5 stars
Under the Radar	7/10 stars

Strange Peace was met with generally favorable reviews from music critics. At Metacritic, which assigns a normalized rating out of 100 to reviews from mainstream publications, the album received an average score of 78 based on nineteen reviews. The aggregator AnyDecentMusic? has the critical consensus of the album at a 7.4 out of 10, based on twenty reviews.

== Track listing ==
All tracks are written by Alex Edkins, Chris Slorach and Hayden Menzies.

No.	Title	Length
1.	"Mess of Wires"	3:29
2.	"Drained Lake"	3:05
3.	"Cellophane"	4:13
4.	"Caterpillar"	3:15
5.	"Lost in the Blank City"	4:28
6.	"Mr. Plague"	2:39
7.	"Sink"	3:50
8.	"Common Trash"	3:14
9.	"Escalator Teeth"	0:47
10.	"Dig a Hole"	1:15
11.	"Raw Materials"	5:57
Total length:		36:07

== Personnel ==
- Alex Edkins – lyrics, vocals, guitar, songwriter, producer, recording, mixing, art direction
- Chris Slorach – bass, songwriter, producer, mixing, art direction
- Hayden Menzies – drums, songwriter, producer, mixing, art direction
- Graham Walsh – recording, mixing
- Steve Albini – recording
- Jeff Kleinsmith – art direction, design
- Anna Edwards – live photography
- Jonathan Bauerle – illustration

== Charts ==
Chart (2017)	Peak position
US Vinyl Albums (Billboard)	17
US Independent Albums (Billboard)	31
US Heatseekers Albums (Billboard)	11
