= 2013 Polaris Music Prize =

Annual Canadian music award ceremony

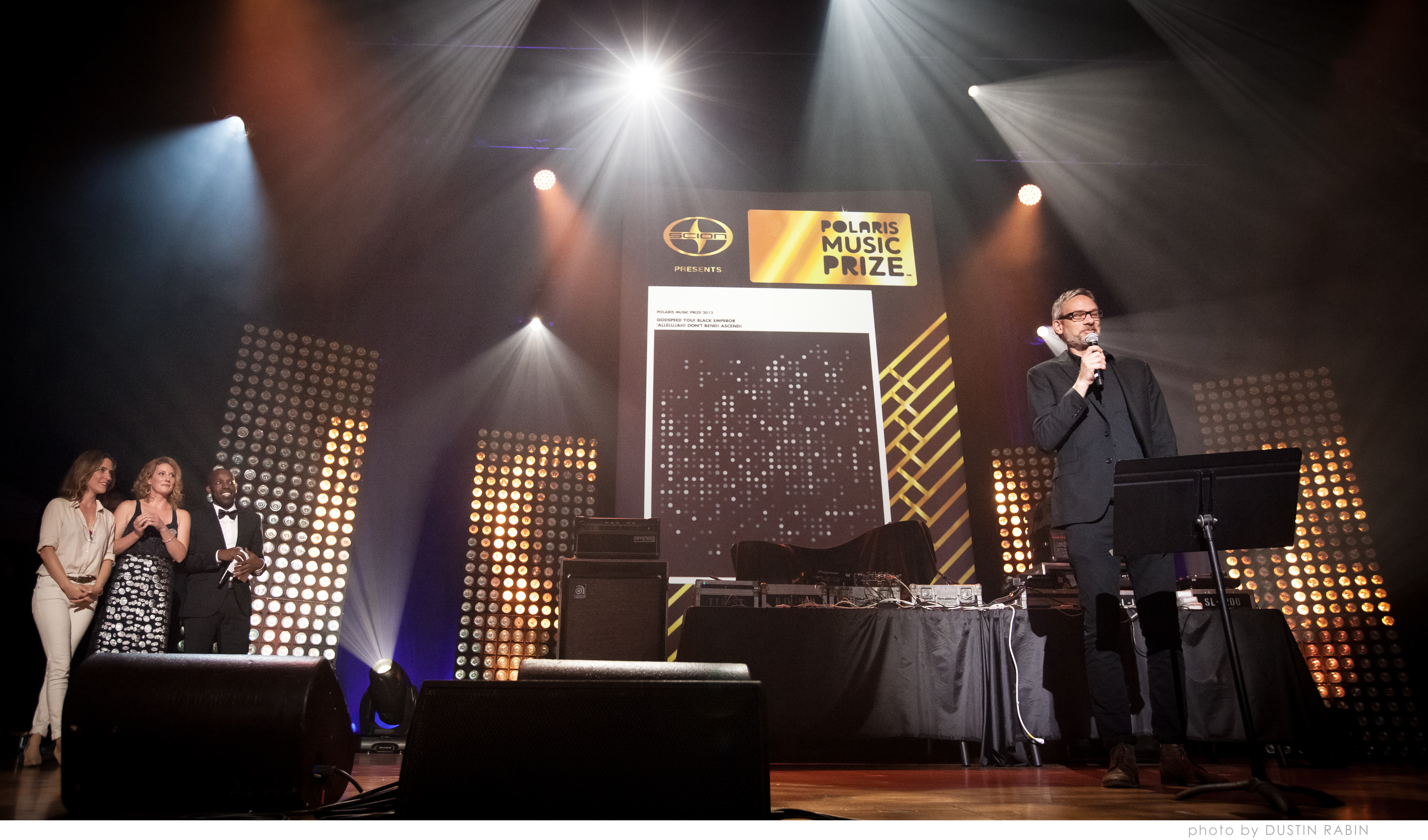
Polaris Music Prize, 2013, by Dustin Rabin

The 2013 edition of the Canadian Polaris Music Prize was presented on September 23, 2013 at The Carlu event theatre in Toronto, Ontario.

The award was won by Godspeed You! Black Emperor for their album 'Allelujah! Don't Bend! Ascend!. The band subsequently released a statement criticizing the prize's gala trappings in a time of austerity, asserting that "organizing a gala just so musicians can compete against each other for a novelty-sized cheque doesn't serve the cause of righteous music at all. Maybe the next celebration should happen in a cruddier hall, without the corporate banners and culture overlords." Despite their criticism the band accepted the award, but donated the prize money to a Quebec-based program of music education in prisons.

== Shortlist ==
The prize's 10-album shortlist was announced on July 16.

- Godspeed You! Black Emperor, 'Allelujah! Don't Bend! Ascend!
- A Tribe Called Red, Nation II Nation
- Zaki Ibrahim, Every Opposite
- Metric, Synthetica
- METZ, METZ
- Purity Ring, Shrines
- Colin Stetson, New History Warfare Vol. 3: To See More Light
- Tegan and Sara, Heartthrob
- Whitehorse, The Fate of the World Depends on This Kiss
- Young Galaxy, Ultramarine

== Longlist ==
The prize's preliminary 40-album longlist was announced on June 13.

- A Tribe Called Red, Nation II Nation
- Alaclair Ensemble, Les maigres blancs d'Amérique du Noir
- Anciients, Heart of Oak
- The Besnard Lakes, Until in Excess, Imperceptible UFO
- Louis-Jean Cormier, Le Treizième étage
- Daphni, Jiaolong
- Mac DeMarco, 2
- Evening Hymns, Spectral Dusk
- Hannah Georgas, Hannah Georgas
- Godspeed You! Black Emperor, 'Allelujah! Don't Bend! Ascend!
- Chilly Gonzales, Solo Piano II
- Jim Guthrie, Takes Time
- Hayden, Us Alone
- Zaki Ibrahim, Every Opposite
- KEN mode, Entrench
- Kid Koala, 12 Bit Blues
- Kobo Town, Jumbie in the Jukebox
- Pierre Lapointe, Punkt
- Lee Harvey Osmond, The Folk Sinner
- Les sœurs Boulay, Le poids des confettis
- Corb Lund, Cabin Fever
- The Luyas, Animator
- Majical Cloudz, Impersonator
- Metric, Synthetica
- METZ, METZ
- Danny Michel with the Garifuna Collective, Black Birds Are Dancing Over Me
- A.C. Newman, Shut Down the Streets
- Old Man Luedecke, Tender Is the Night
- Lindi Ortega, Cigarettes & Truckstops
- Peter Peter, Une version améliorée de la tristesse
- Purity Ring, Shrines
- Rah Rah, The Poet's Dead
- Rhye, Woman
- Daniel Romano, Come Cry With Me
- Colin Stetson, New History Warfare Vol. 3: To See More Light
- Suuns, Images du futur
- Tegan and Sara, Heartthrob
- Al Tuck, Stranger at the Wake
- Whitehorse, The Fate of the World Depends on This Kiss
- Young Galaxy, Ultramarine
