= II (Metz album) =

Studio album by Metz
- Released: May 4, 2015
- Recorded: 2014
- Studio: Basketball 4 Life; The Dream House; Candle Recording; Taurus Recording
- Genre: Noise rock; punk rock; hardcore punk; post-punk
- Length: 29:50
- Label: Sub Pop
- Producer: Metz

Metz chronology
| METZ (2012) | II (2015) | Strange Peace (2017) |

Singles from II
- 1. "Acetate" Released: February 17, 2015; 2. "The Swimmer" Released: May 4, 2015

II is the second studio album by Canadian noise rock three-piece band Metz. It was released on 4 May 2015, via Sub Pop. The recording sessions took place at Basketball 4 Life, The Dream House, Candle Recording and Taurus Recording in 2014. The album was produced by the band.

The album was a long-listed nominee for the 2015 Polaris Music Prize.

== Critical reception ==
Professional ratings
Aggregate scores
| Source | Rating |
|---|---|
| Metacritic | 78/100 |
Review scores
| Source | Rating |
| The A.V. Club | B |
| Consequence of Sound | B |
| DIY | 5/5 stars |
| Drowned in Sound | 8/10 |
| Exclaim! | 8/10 |
| The Line of Best Fit | 8.5/10 |
| Pitchfork | 6.7/10 |
| PopMatters | 8/10 |
| Rolling Stone | 3.5/5 stars |
| Spin | 8/10 |

II was met with generally favourable reviews from music critics. At Metacritic, which assigns a normalized rating out of 100 to reviews from mainstream publications, the album received an average score of 78 based on twenty-three reviews.

Matthew Davies Lombardi of DIY praised the album, calling it "an advert to be a whole new generation's Sonic Youth or Nirvana and on this performance, you'd be foolish not to buy in". James Appleyard of The Line of Best Fit stated: "with II, Metz have done more than enough to cement themselves as the new kings of transgressive hard rock, and that's a crown which is going to be difficult for anyone to wrestle from them". Marc Burrows of Drowned in Sound called it "beautifully brutal weirdo punk". Jibril Yassin of Exclaim! wrote: "it's a bleak listen, but there's something comforting about hearing three musicians playing punishing music as a complete unit, knowing there are few that could do it like them". Ian King of PopMatters found the album "does find the band more often playing to their strengths than looking for ways to expand their horizons". Colin Joyce of Spin wrote: "II, like the record that preceded it, is still a seasick and unyielding document of brutalist experimentation. But because the trio is willing to explore different avenues, there's more corners to get lost in". Dusty Henry of Consequence of Sound resumed: "it may take a few listens to soak in all the vitriol and venom, but it's worth the effort". Carl Williott of The A.V. Club wrote: "if that self-titled first outing was like picking at a scab, Metz's second effort is equivalent to ripping off a Band-Aid. Either way, it's still music to bleed to". Brandon Geist of Rolling Stone wrote: "singer-guitarist Alex Edkins flirts with full-on nihilism, but there are hooks hidden in the onslaught, and Edkins' fever-pitch angst never feels less than honest". Paul Thompson of Pitchfork stated: "by sticking so closely to the script laid out by their debut, II is the one thing punk rock should never be: careful".

== Track listing ==
| No. | Title | Length |
|---|---|---|
| 1. | "Acetate" | 3:55 |
| 2. | "The Swimmer" | 2:41 |
| 3. | "Spit You Out" | 4:49 |
| 4. | "Zzyzx" | 0:34 |
| 5. | "I.O.U." | 2:52 |
| 6. | "Landfill" | 2:42 |
| 7. | "Nervous System" | 2:09 |
| 8. | "Wait in Line" | 3:16 |
| 9. | "Eyes Peeled" | 2:33 |
| 10. | "Kicking a Can of Worms" | 4:19 |
| Total length: | | 29:50 |

== Personnel ==
- METZ – songwriters, producers, mixing, design
  - Alex Edkins – additional recording
  - Chris Slorach
  - Hayden Menzies
- Graham Walsh – recording, mixing
- Alex Bonenfant – recording
- Calvin Hartwick – engineering assistant
- Matthew Barnhart – mastering
- Sasha Barr – design
- John Edkins – photography
- David Waldman – photography

== Charts ==
| Chart (2015) | Peak position |
|---|---|
| UK Vinyl Albums Chart (OCC) | 27 |
| UK Record Store Chart (OCC) | 20 |
| UK Rock & Metal Albums (OCC) | 22 |
| US Heatseekers Albums (Billboard) | 3 |
| US Independent Albums (Billboard) | 13 |
| US Top Alternative Albums (Billboard) | 17 |
| US Top Hard Rock Albums (Billboard) | 4 |
| US Top Rock Albums (Billboard) | 26 |
| US Indie Store Album Sales (Billboard) | 8 |
| US Vinyl Albums (Billboard) | 7 |
