= Cigarettes & Truckstops =

Studio album by Lindi Ortega
- Released: October 2, 2012
- Genre: Country
- Length: 37:35
- Label: Last Gang Records
- Producer: Colin Linden

Lindi Ortega chronology
Little Red Boots (2011)	Cigarettes & Truckstops (2012)	Tin Star (2013)

Professional ratings
Review scores
Source	Rating
AllMusic	3.5/5 stars

Cigarettes & Truckstops is the fourth studio album by Lindi Ortega, released in 2012.

The album was named a longlisted nominee for the 2013 Polaris Music Prize on June 13, 2013.

== Track listing ==
All tracks written by Lindi Ortega unless otherwise noted.

No.	Title	Writer(s)	Length
1.	"Cigarettes & Truckstops"		4:29
2.	"The Day You Die"		3:01
3.	"Lead Me On"		4:25
4.	"Don't Wanna Hear It"		2:59
5.	"Demons Don't Get Me Down"		3:55
6.	"Murder of Crows"		4:39
7.	"Heaven Has No Vacancy"		3:52
8.	"High"	Lindi Ortega, Bruce Wallace	3:54
9.	"Use Me"		3:03
10.	"Every Mile of the Ride"		3:16

== Chart performance ==
Chart (2012)	Peak position
US Billboard Top Country Albums	71
US Billboard Top Heatseekers	42
