= Studio (band) =

Swedish musical duo

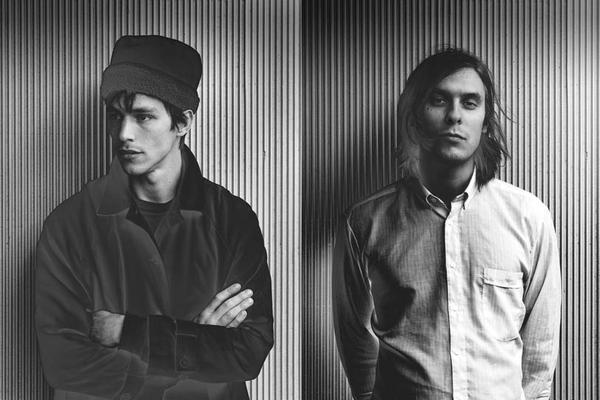

Background information
- Origin: Gothenburg, Sweden
- Genres: Indietronica; New wave Balearic; Experimental
- Years active: 2000-2010; 2025-present
- Labels: Ghostly International; Information; Service
- Members: Dan Lissvik
- Past members: Rasmus Hägg

Studio is a Swedish music project founded by Dan Lissvik while studying at the Valand School of Fine Arts in Gothenburg. The project later expanded to include Rasmus Hägg as well as collaborators Jesper Nordblad, Dieter Hallén and Oskar Johansson.

Studio have been described as the missing link between The Cure and Lindstrøm – while simultaneously touching upon Can, Neu, Happy Mondays and The Smiths – in their creation of an "afrobeat-dub-disco-indie-pop" adventure. Their debut album West Coast was originally released in 2006 and was reissued by Ghostly International in January 2025.

== Discography ==
=== CD/download ===
- West Coast (2006)
- Yearbook 1 (2007)
- Yearbook 2 (2008)

=== LP, 12" and 7" ===
- West Side Parts 1 and 2 (2007) (7", limited edition of 1,000 copies)
- West Coast (album)|West Coast (Second Edition, double LP)
- Life's a Beach! Todd Terje and Prins Thomas Remixes (12")
- West Coast (2006) (LP, limited edition of 500 copies)
- No Comply (2006) (12", limited edition of 500 copies)

=== Remixes ===
- Shout Out Louds - Possible
- Rubies - A Room Without A Key
- Love Is All - Turn The Radio Off (Remake)
- A Mountain of One - Brown Piano (Remake)
- Studio/Brennan Green - East Side and Escape From Chinatown
- Kylie - 2 Hearts
- Williams - Love On A Real Train
