= Young Galaxy =

Canadian indie and dream pop band

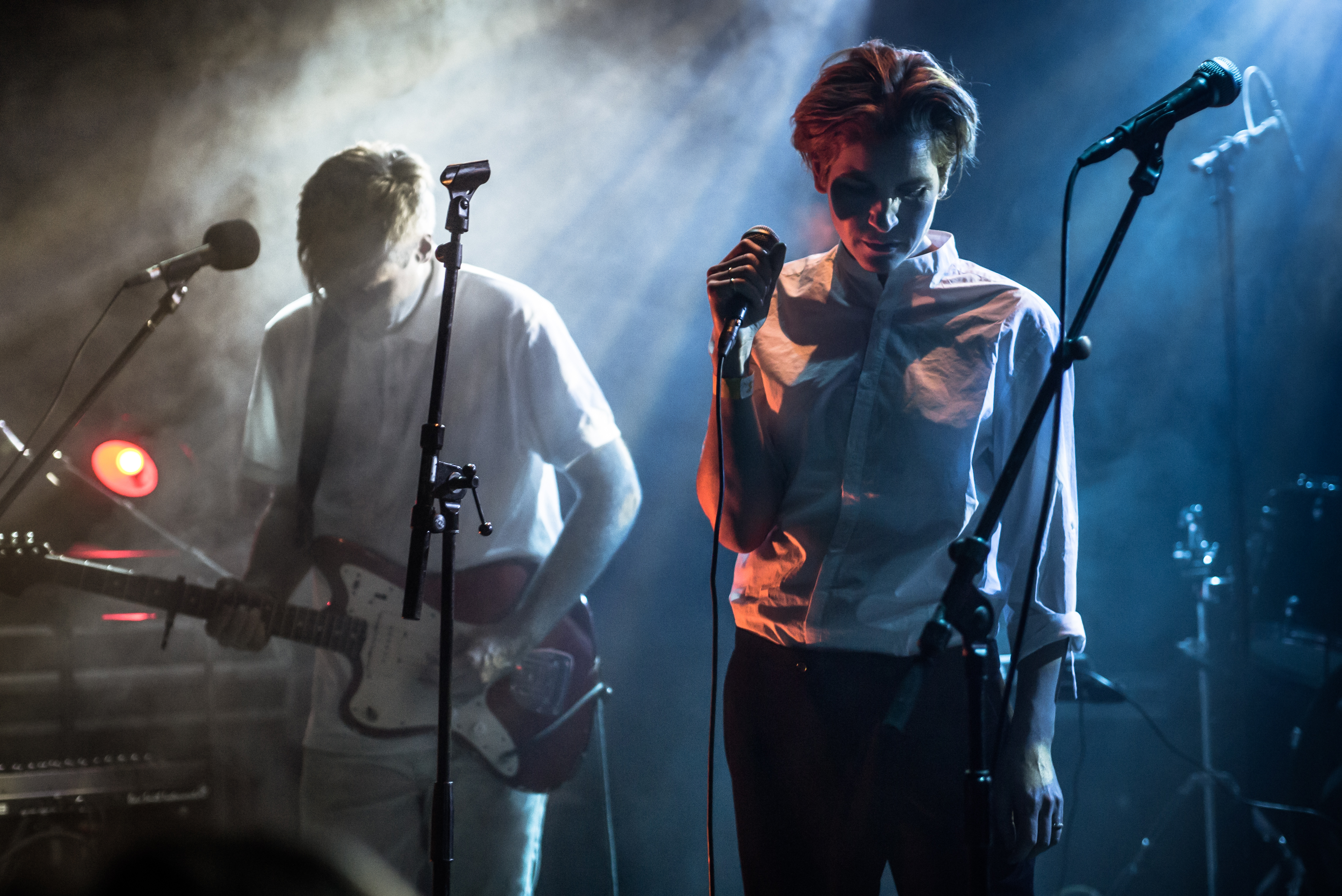
- Young Galaxy performing in 2013

Background information
- Origin: Montreal, Quebec, Canada
- Genres: Indie pop, dream pop, synthpop
- Years active: 2005–2018
- Labels: Paper Bag Records; Arts & Crafts, Fontana North
- Members: Stephen Ramsay; Catherine McCandless
- Past members: Pat Sayers; Susan Beckett; Stephen Durand; Liam O' Neill; James Lynn; Max Henry; Stephen Kamp; Andrea Silver; Matt Shapiro
- Website: younggalaxy.com

Young Galaxy is a Canadian indie pop/dream pop band formed in 2005 in Vancouver, whose members are husband and wife, Stephen Ramsay and Catherine McCandless.

== History ==
Young Galaxy formed in Vancouver as a duo including Stephen Ramsay and Catherine McCandless. Through that summer of 2005 and the spring of 2006 they recorded with appearances and contributions of friends at Jace Lasek's Breakglass Studio. Their sound has been described as similar to the bands Slowdive, Galaxie 500 and Luna as well as Pink Floyd and Spiritualized. The band has toured in Canada, The United States and Europe, opening for Arcade Fire, Peter, Bjorn and John, Stars, and Death Cab For Cutie. They later moved to Montreal, where they recorded their self-titled debut. The album was released April 24, 2007, on Arts & Crafts. The song "Come and See" from the first album was featured on the soundtrack to the movie The Way, Way Back.

They recorded their second album, Invisible Republic, in Montreal at Hotel2Tango studio with Radwan Moumneh engineering (A Silver Mt. Zion, Pas Chic Chic) and at Breakglass Studios with Jace Lasek of The Besnard Lakes engineering. Invisible Republic was released independently on August 25, 2009. It was mixed by Tony Doogan (Mogwai, Belle & Sebastian, Snow Patrol) in Glasgow, Scotland. It was subsequently released in July 2010 in the US by Paper Bag Records, and received a long list nomination for the 2010 Polaris Music Prize. The band followed up in fall 2010 with YG No Art EP, an EP comprising unreleased tracks and remixes from the Invisible Republic sessions.

Their third album, Shapeshifting, was produced by Dan Lissvik of the band Studio in Gothenburg, Sweden. The album was released in February 2011 on Paper Bag Records and April 2011 in Europe through the Norwegian label, Smalltown Supersound. The album was long-listed for the Polaris Music Prize in 2011 and made it to many year-end lists. Shortly after the release of Shapeshifting, two remix EPs for the singles from that album, "Cover Your Tracks" and "We Have Everything", were released and featured remixes from bands and producers who are friends with Young Galaxy. Following that, Versus, another free remix EP was released, which featured Young Galaxy remixing songs of their friends in other bands.

Young Galaxy's fourth album, Ultramarine, was released on April 23, 2013. In June 2013, the album was shortlisted for the 2013 Polaris Music Prize. This was their first album in which all lead vocals were performed solely by McCandless.

Their fifth album, Falsework, was released on October 30, 2015, produced by Dan Lissvik.

In 2017, the band released two one-off singles, "Stay For Real", and "Elusive Dream".

On January 10, 2018, Young Galaxy announced a new album, Down Time, along with the first single, "Under My Wing". It was released on April 6, 2018, and is their first album released as a fully independent band. In September of the same year they released their Snow Leopard EP, and announced an indefinite hiatus.

== Discography ==
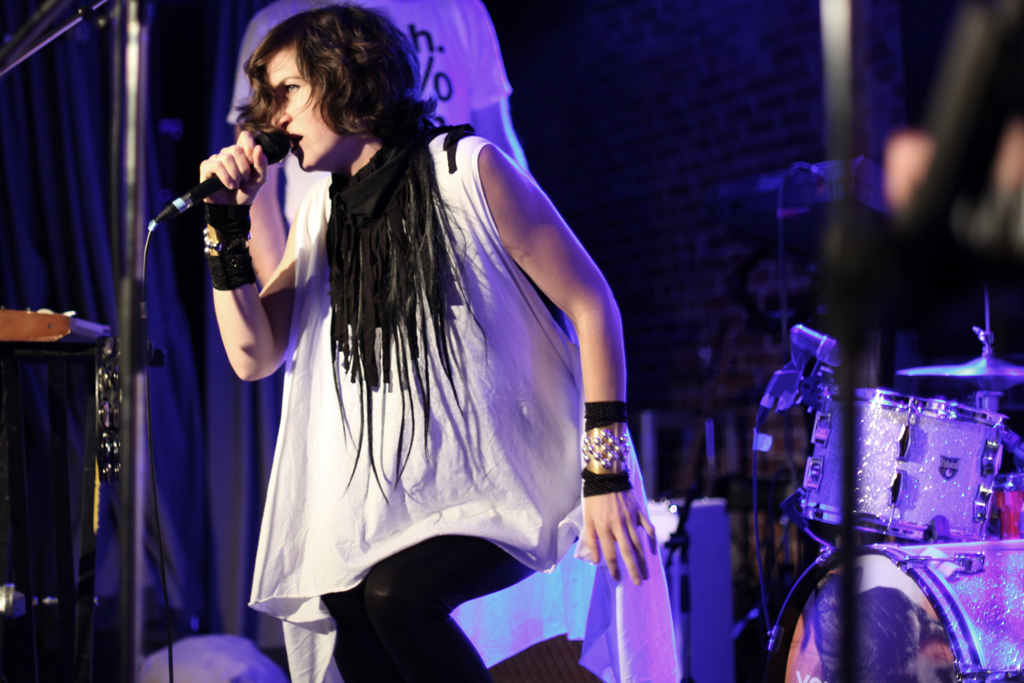
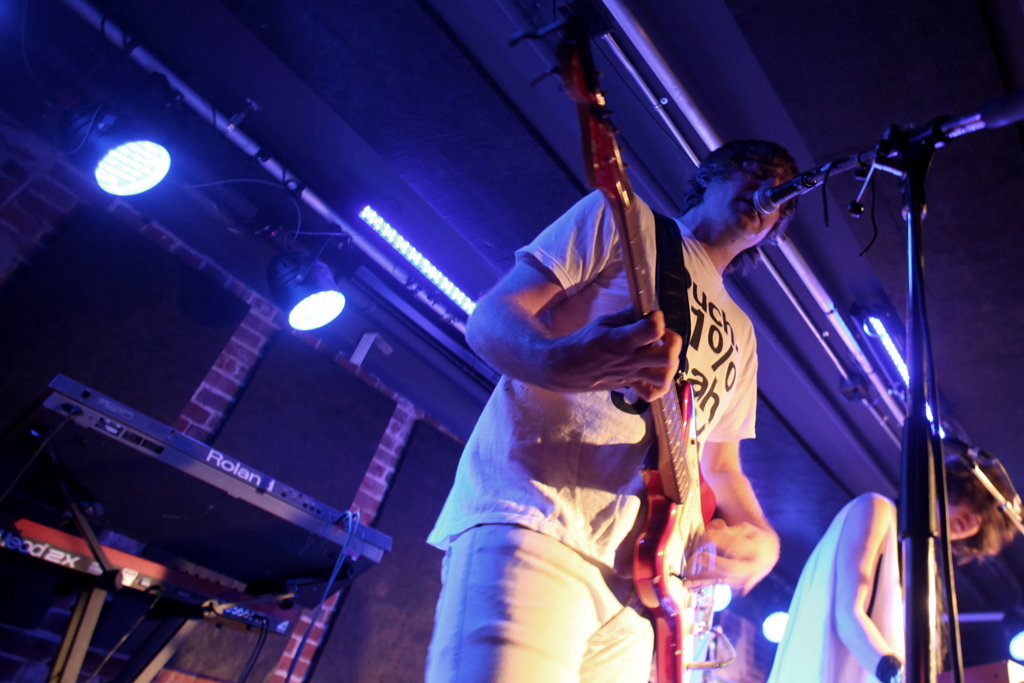
Young Galaxy in 2011

=== Albums ===
- 2007 Young Galaxy
- 2009 Invisible Republic
- 2011 Shapeshifting
- 2013 Ultramarine
- 2015 Falsework
- 2018 Down Time

=== EPs ===
- 2006 Swing Your Heartache
- 2010 YG No Art
- 2011 Cover Your Tracks
- 2011 We Have Everything
- 2011 Versus
- 2012 "Shoreless Kid/Youth Is Wasted On The Young" (7" single)
- 2018 Snow Leopard
