= Invisible Republic (album) =

Studio album by Young Galaxy
- Released: August 25, 2009
- Recorded: January 2008 to August 2008
- Genre: Indie rock
- Length: 44min
- Label: Fontana North
- Producer: Jace Lasek, Radwan Moumneh

Young Galaxy chronology
Young Galaxy (2007)	Invisible Republic (2009)	No Art EP (2010)

Invisible Republic is the second album by the Canadian indie rock band Young Galaxy, released August 25, 2009 on Fontana North.

The album is a longlisted nominee for the 2010 Polaris Music Prize.

== Track listing ==
All songs feature Liam O'Neil on drums, Max Henry on keyboards, Stephen Kamp on bass, Catherine McCandless on vocals and Stephen Ramsay on guitars and vocals.

No.	Title	Writer(s)	Additional Player(s)	Length
1.	"Long Live the Fallen World"	Ramsay/McCandless		4:56
2.	"Oh Sister"	Henry/Ramsay/McCandless		3:41
3.	"Destroyer"	Ramsay/McCandless	vocals by Corri-Lynn Tetz and Olga Goreas	4:31
4.	"Pathos"	Henry/McCandless	french horn by Chris Seligman	2:22
5.	"Light Years"	Ramsay/McCandless	violin by Joshua Zubot cello by Annie Lawrence viola by Maria Herron glide guitar by Graham Lessard	5:45
6.	"Disposable Times"	Ramsay/McCandless	bongos by SNAXX	4:25
7.	"Dreams"	Ramsay/McCandless	violin by Joshua Zubot	4:30
8.	"Queen Drum"	Ramsay/McCandless		3:51
9.	"Smoke And Mirror Show"	Young Galaxy		4:47
10.	"Firestruck"	Ramsay/McCandless	shred guitar by Steve Raegele french horn by Chris Seligman	5:12
