= Love Is All (band) =

Swedish indie pop band

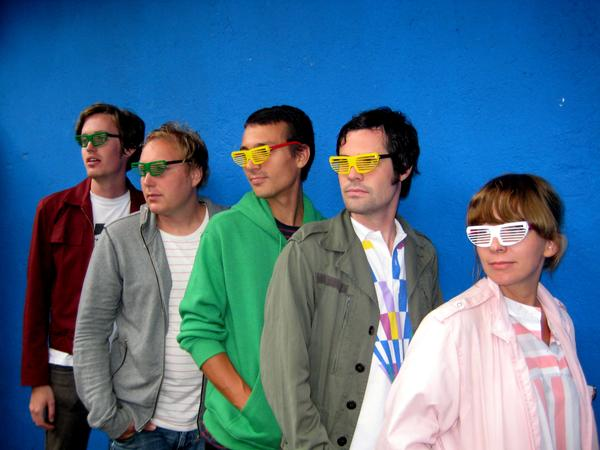

Background information
- Origin: Gothenburg, Sweden
- Genre: Indie pop
- Years active: 2003–present
- Labels: What's Your Rupture? Polyvinyl Record Co.
- Members: Nicholaus Sparding; Josephine Olausson; James Ausfahrt; Markus Görsch; Johan Lindwall
- Past members: Fredrik Eriksson

Love Is All is a Swedish five-piece indie pop band from Gothenburg. It releases songs in English. Paste Magazine has stated that it makes "infectiously lo-fi punk rock laced with saxophone and melodic vocals". Their most acclaimed single, "Make out fall out make up" is included among Pitchfork's 200 best songs of 2000s.

== Biography ==
Swedish band Love Is All are composed of Josephine Olausson (vocals, keyboard), Johan Lindwall (bass), Markus Görsch (drums), James Ausfahrt (saxophone), and Nicholaus Sparding (guitar/vocals). Olausson, Sparding, and Görsch had previously been members of Girlfrendo. The trio promptly regrouped after that band's demise and added Lindwall, who had recorded in a side project with Olausson and Sparding called Cat Skills. They finally added the missing piece with saxophone player Fredrik Eriksson. While earning many rave reviews from the blogging community for their blend of art punk and indie rock, the band released several singles, one of which made single of the week in NME. The singles were collected on the debut LP Nine Times That Same Song, released by New York-based What's Your Rupture? in late 2005. The album was re-released in the world outside of North America by the British record label Parlophone in 2006. After much touring through 2006 and 2007, Eriksson left the band and Love Is All continued on as a quartet. A Hundred Things Keep Me Up at Night and the remix album Love Is All Mixed Up arrived in 2008, along with Eriksson's replacement Åke Strömer (saxophone, keyboards). They are currently signed to Polyvinyl Record Co.

== Discography ==
=== Albums ===
- Nine Times That Same Song (What's Your Rupture?) (2006)
- A Hundred Things Keep Me Up at Night (What's Your Rupture?) (2008)
- Two Thousand and Ten Injuries (Polyvinyl Record Co.) (2010)

=== Remix albums ===
- Love Is All...Mixed Up (What's Your Rupture?) (2008)

=== Singles and EPs ===
- "Spinning And Scratching / Make Out, Fall Out, Make Up / Ageing Had Never Been His Friend" 7-inch EP (2003)
- "Lost Thrills" (Dolores Recordings)
- "Felt Tip" (Smashing Time)
- "Make Out, Fall Out, Make Up" (2006) (What's Your Rupture?) No. 133 UK
- "Busy Doing Nothing" (2006) (What's Your Rupture?) No. 103 UK
- "Used Goods" (What's Your Rupture?)
- "Ageing Had Never Been His Friend / Nothing To Be Done" (2007) (What's Your Rupture?)
- "Love is All Play 5 Covers" (2008) (self-released)
- "Wishing Well & Covers" (2008) (Emusic)
- "Last Choice" (EP) (2009) (What's Your Rupture?)

=== Other appearances ===
- "Pappas Tant (previously unreleased)" (September 2011, Polyvinyl Records's Japan 3.11.11: A Benefit Album)
