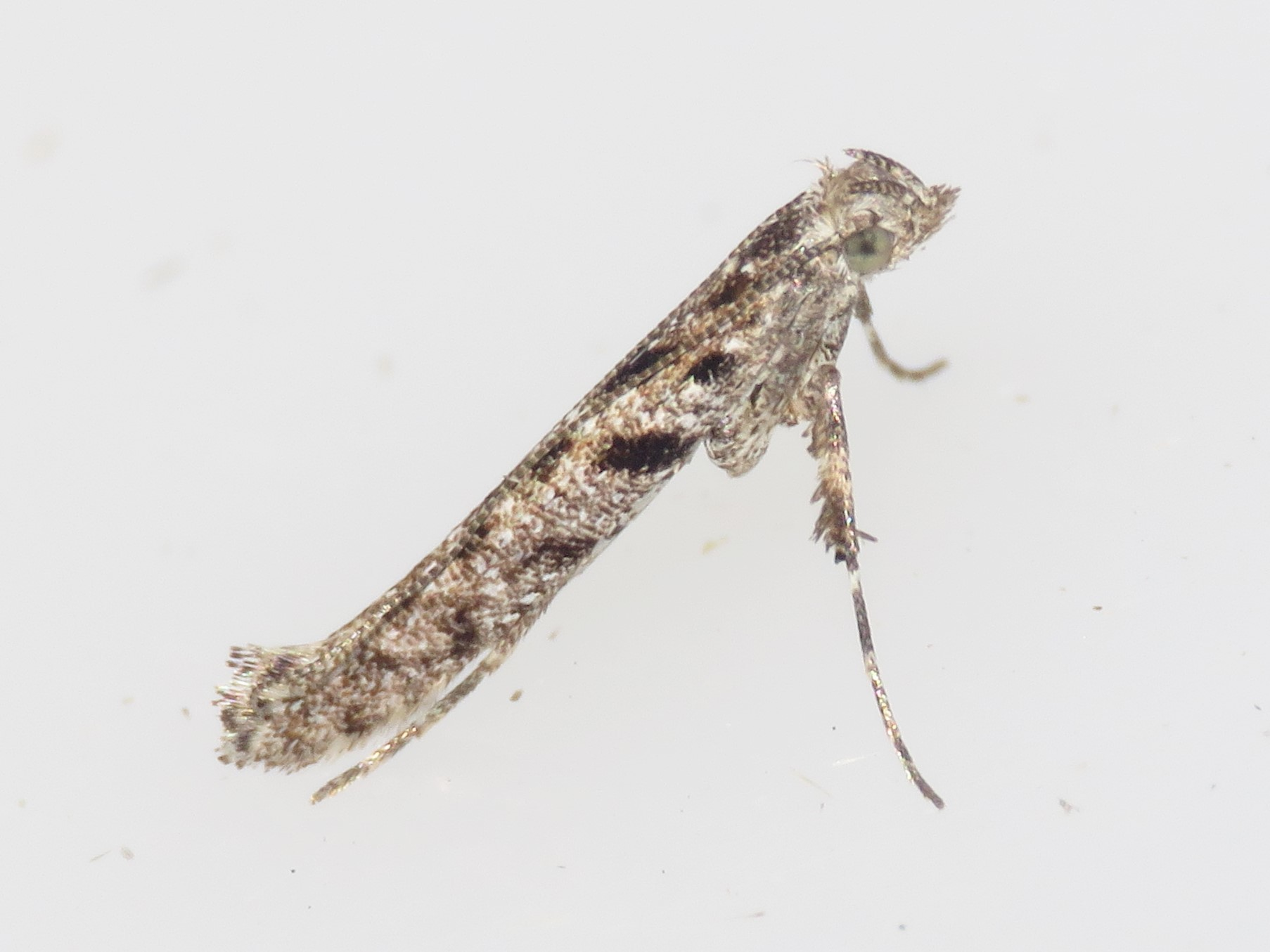
- Caloptilia fraxinella

Scientific classification
- Kingdom: Animalia
- Phylum: Arthropoda
- Class: Insecta
- Order: Lepidoptera
- Family: Gracillariidae
- Genus: Caloptilia
- Species: C. fraxinella

Binomial name
- Caloptilia fraxinella (Ely, 1915)

= Caloptilia fraxinella =

Ash leaf cone roller moth

Species of moth

Caloptilia fraxinella (ash leaf cone roller moth) is a moth of the family Gracillariidae. It is known from Canada (Québec, Alberta, Ontario and Saskatchewan) and the United States (Michigan, Vermont, Ohio, Connecticut, New York and Maine).

It is considered a significant pest of horticultural ash.

The larvae feed on Fraxinus species (including Fraxinus americana, Fraxinus mandshurica, Fraxinus nigra and Fraxinus pennsylvanica) and Ligustrum species. They mine the leaves of their host plant.
