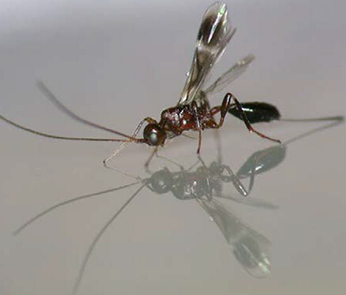
- Spathius agrili adult

Scientific classification
- Domain: Eukaryota
- Kingdom: Animalia
- Phylum: Arthropoda
- Class: Insecta
- Order: Hymenoptera
- Family: Braconidae
- Genus: Spathius
- Species: S. agrili

Binomial name
- Spathius agrili Yang 2005

= Spathius agrili =

Species of wasp

Spathius agrili is a parasitic non-stinging wasp of family Braconidae which is native to North Asia. It is a parasitoid of the emerald ash borer (Agrilus planipennis Fairmaire), an invasive species which has destroyed tens of millions of ash trees in its introduced range in North America. As part of the campaign against the emerald ash borer (EAB), American scientists in conjunction with the Chinese Academy of Forestry began searching in 2003 for its natural enemies in the wild, leading to the discovery of several parasitoid wasp species, including Spathius agrili. S. agrili was discovered in Tianjin, China where it is a prevalent parasitoid of EAB larvae in stands of an introduced ash species (Fraxinus velutina), and an endemic ash species (Fraxinus mandshurica). S. agrili has been recorded to attack and kill up to 90 percent of EAB larvae.

This wasp is a gregarious ectoparasitoid, meaning it lays multiple eggs on the surface of its host, and the larva feed externally. The life cycle of S. agrili was found to be synchronized with that of its preferred host stages – the emergence of adult wasps took place when third and fourth-instar larvae of EAB were available. The female wasps oviposit through the tree bark, paralyze the host larva and lay a clutch of eggs on the integument. The eggs hatch and the wasp larvae feed on the paralyzed host. When the larvae mature, they spin a cocoon and pupate within the host gallery. Spathuis overwinter as pupae within their cocoons under the bark of ash trees and emerge as adults in the summer.

== Biological control ==
Spathius agrili, and two other species of parasitoid wasps (Tetrastichus planipennisi, and Oobius agrili), were introduced and released into the United States as biological control agents of the EAB. However, of the three, Tetrastichus planipennisi has been the most effective at parasitizing EAB and establishing self-sustaining populations.

Detailed research was conducted on the wasps before they were approved for release as biocontrol agents. Laboratory methods have been developed for continuous rearing of this and other species of EAB parasitoid wasps. Extensive tests of the specificity of these parasitoids on native beetles and other insects were carried out. No-choice laboratory assays of larval wood-boring insects from China and North America showed they were capable of attacking other species of Agrilus, although success of parasitism was significantly lower in species other than EAB. S. agrili was only attracted to select species of Fraxinus and to Salix babylonica. In natural settings, S. agrili will be unlikely to encounter and parasitize non-target larvae as it does not search other tree species. This, in addition to other tests of host specificity, led to approval of the wasp for controlled releases in specific study sites in the United States for further research.
