= Rhopalovalva pulchra =

Scientific classification
- Domain: Eukaryota
- Kingdom: Animalia
- Phylum: Arthropoda
- Class: Insecta
- Order: Lepidoptera
- Family: Tortricidae
- Genus: Rhopalovalva
- Species: R. pulchra

Binomial name
- Rhopalovalva pulchra (Butler, 1879)

Synonyms
- Phoxopteryx pulchra Butler, 1879

Species of moth

Rhopalovalva pulchra is a species of moth of the family Tortricidae. It is found in China (Zhejiang, Fujian), Korea, Japan and the Russian Far East.

The wingspan is 11–15 mm.

The larvae feed on Quercus species and Fraxinus mandshurica var. japonica.
