= Gracillaria albicapitata =

Scientific classification
- Kingdom: Animalia
- Phylum: Arthropoda
- Class: Insecta
- Order: Lepidoptera
- Family: Gracillariidae
- Genus: Gracillaria
- Species: G. albicapitata

Binomial name
- Gracillaria albicapitata Issiki, 1930

Synonyms
- Caloptilia albicapitata; Lyoneta jezonella Matsumura, 1931; Gracillaria jezoniella (Kuznetzov & Baryshnikova, 1998); Gracillaria syringifoliella (Ermolaev, 1981)

Species of moth

Gracillaria albicapitata is a moth of the family Gracillariidae. It is known from the islands of Hokkaidō and Honshū in Japan and the Russian Far East.

The wingspan is 9.8–12.5 mm.

The larvae feed on Fraxinus lanuginosa, Fraxinus mandshurica, Syringa amurensis, Syringa reticulata and Syringa vulgaris. They mine the leaves of their host plant.
