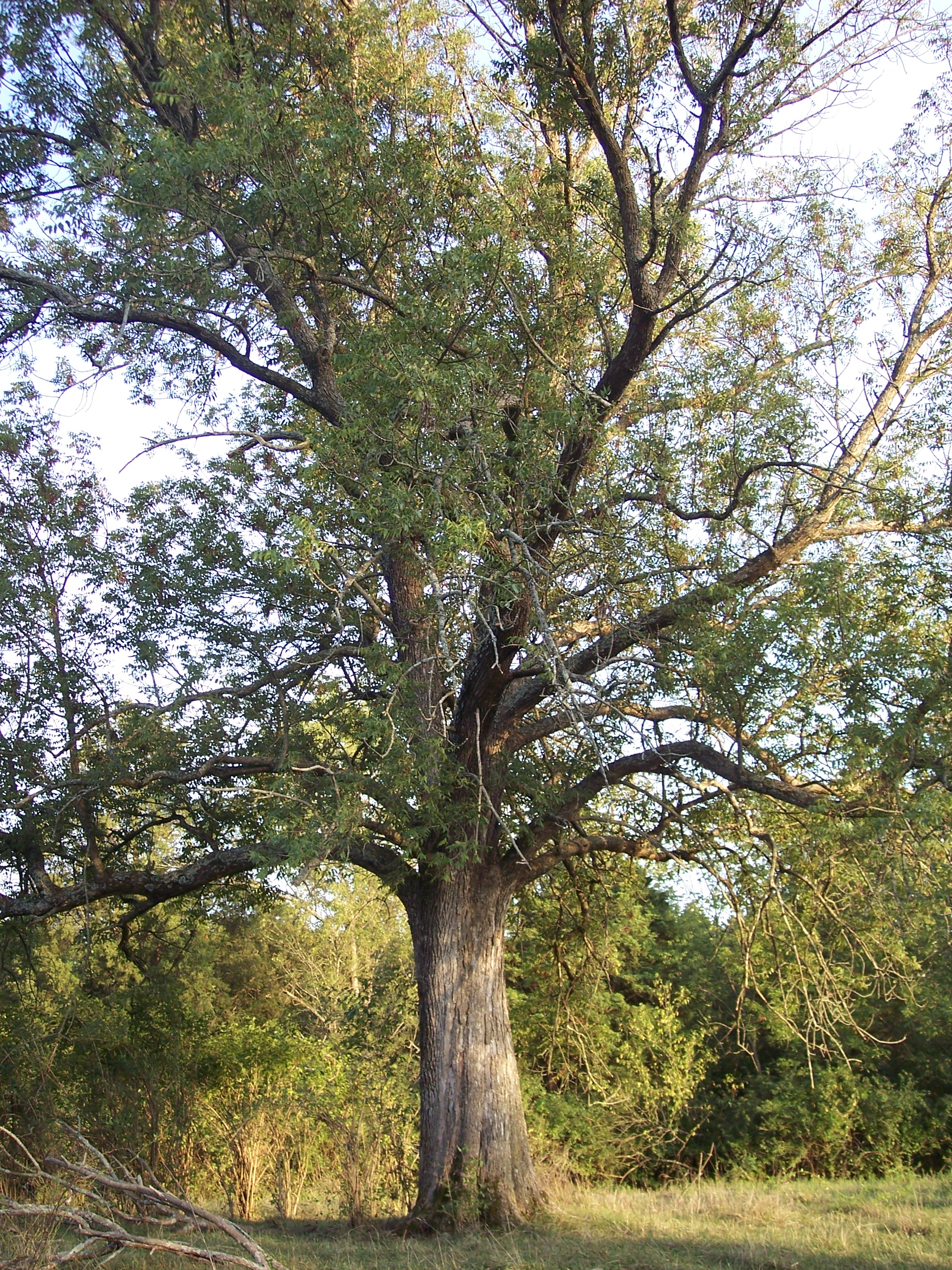

Conservation status
- Critically Endangered (IUCN 3.1)

Scientific classification
- Kingdom: Plantae
- Clade: Embryophytes
- Clade: Tracheophytes
- Clade: Spermatophytes
- Clade: Angiosperms
- Clade: Eudicots
- Clade: Asterids
- Order: Lamiales
- Family: Oleaceae
- Genus: Fraxinus
- Section: Fraxinus sect. Dipetalae
- Species: F. quadrangulata

Binomial name
- Fraxinus quadrangulata Michx.
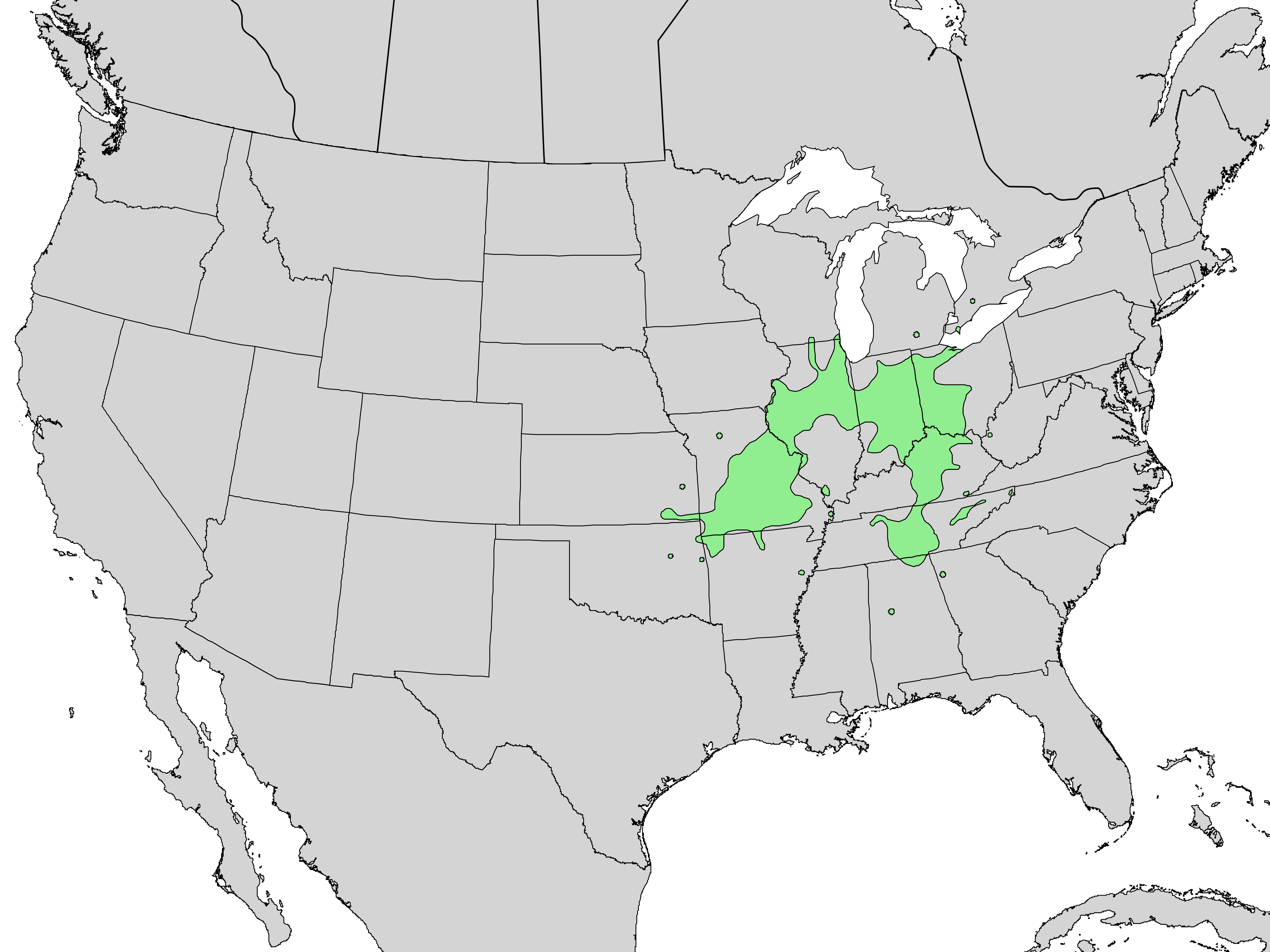
- Natural range of Fraxinus quadrangulata
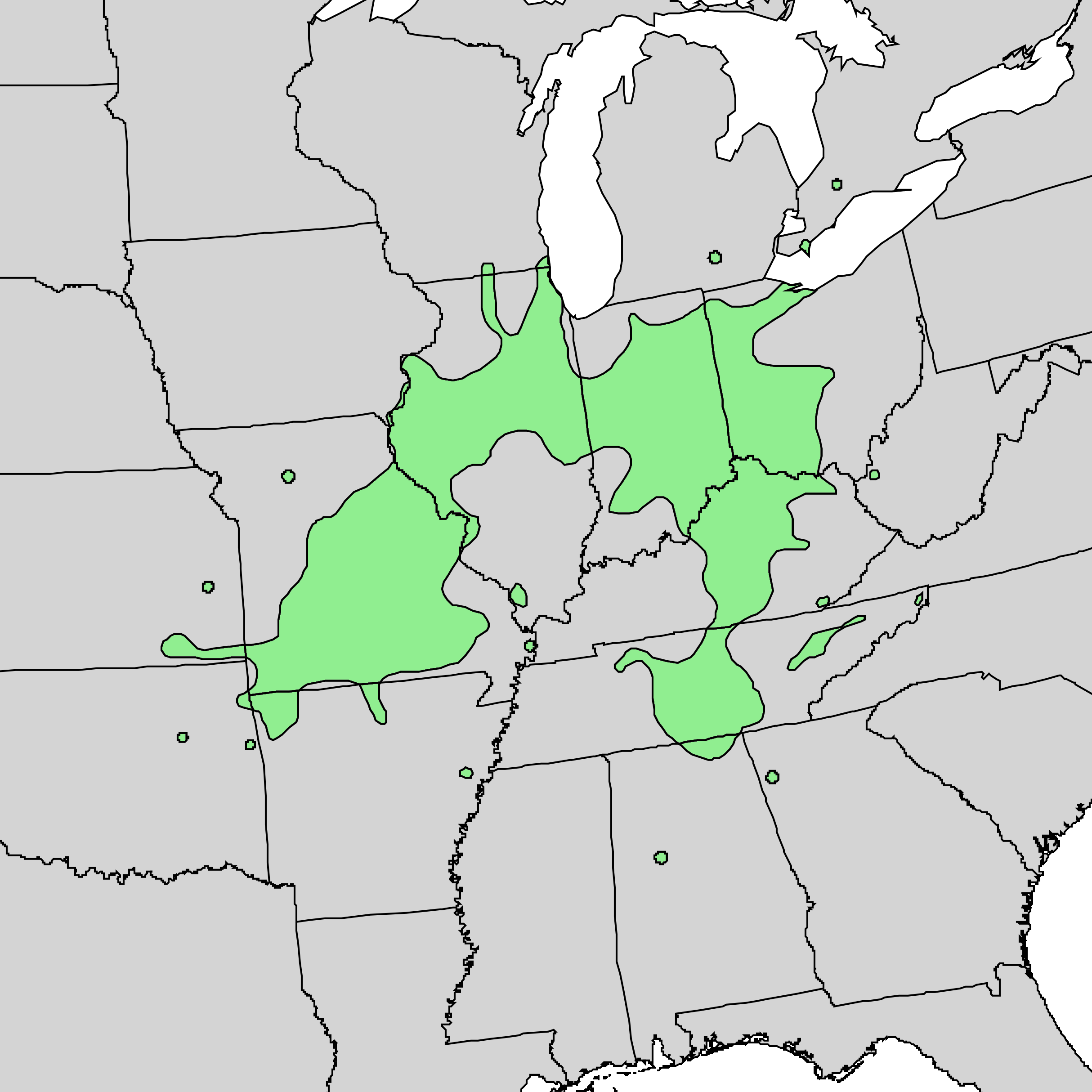
- Close-up of natural range of Fraxinus quadrangulata

= Fraxinus quadrangulata =

Blue ash

Species of ash

Fraxinus quadrangulata, the blue ash, is a species of ash native primarily to the Midwestern United States from Oklahoma to Michigan, as well as the Bluegrass region of Kentucky and the Nashville Basin region of Tennessee. Isolated populations exist in Alabama, Southern Ontario, and small sections of the Appalachian Mountains. It is typically found over calcareous substrates such as limestone, growing on limestone slopes and in moist valley soils, at elevations of 120–600 m (390–1,970 ft).

== Description ==
Blue ash is a medium sized deciduous tree typically reaching a height of 10–25 m (33–82 ft) with a trunk 50–100 cm (20–39 in) in diameter. The twigs typically have four corky ridges, a distinctive feature giving them a square appearance (in cross-section), hence the species name, quadrangulata, meaning four-angled. The winter buds are reddish-brown. The leaves are 20–38 cm (7.9–15.0 in) long, with 5–11 (most often 7) leaflets, the leaflets 7–13 cm (2.8–5.1 in) long and 2.5–5 cm (0.98–1.97 in) broad, with a coarsely serrated margin and short but distinct petiolules. The flowers are small and purplish, produced in the early spring before the leaves appear. The fruit is a samara 2.5–5 cm (0.98–1.97 in) long and 6–12 mm (0.24–0.47 in) broad, including the wing.

== History and uses ==
The name blue ash is derived from the black dye extracted from the tree's inner bark through immersion in water. European colonists and American pioneers used this dye to color yarn for use in the production of textiles, sewing, crocheting, knitting, weaving, and embroidery. Blue Ash wood is used to make flooring, baseball bats, furniture, tool handles, crates and barrels. The city of Blue Ash, Ohio, an inner suburb of Cincinnati, drew its name from the blue ash trees in the area, the logs of which were used to build many of the community's earliest buildings.

North American native ash tree species are used by North American frogs as a critical food source, as the leaves that fall from the trees are particularly suitable for tadpoles to feed upon in ponds (both temporary and permanent), large puddles, and other water sources. Species such as red maple, which are taking the place of ash, due to the ash borer, are much less suitable for the frogs as a food source—resulting in poor frog survival rates and small frog sizes. It is the lack of tannins in the American ash varieties that makes them good for the frogs as a food source and also not resistant to the ash borer. Varieties of ash from outside North America typically have much higher tannin levels and resist the borer. Maples and various non-native invasive trees, which are taking the place of American ash species in the North American ecosystem, typically have much higher leaf tannin levels. It is possible that the blue ash's increased resistance to the borer, as compared with other North American varieties, is due to a higher tannin content. If that is the case, the blue ash is less palatable for maturing frogs than those most threatened by the borer. Black Ash species native to North America also provide important habitat and food for various other creatures that are native to North America.

== Conservation status ==
As of 2014, blue ash appears to be least threatened in comparison to other North American ash by the infestation of the emerald ash borer. First detected in North America in 2002, this invasive beetle has since spread throughout much of this tree's range. Approximately sixty to seventy percent of these trees survive compared to other ash such as black ash and green ash where up to ninety-nine percent of them are killed by emerald ash borer. In 2017, the blue ash, along with other ashes native to the Eastern United States such as the black ash, green ash and white ash were assessed as Critically Endangered by the IUCN. This is due to the non-native invasive emerald ash borer's massive population increase across the native habitat of these trees.

In Canada, Fraxinus quadrangulata is legally protected as a threatened species under the Species at Risk Act. F. quadrangulata is found in Ontario and has experienced habitat fragmentation within that portion of its range. Ongoing threats to this species in Canada may include white-tailed deer browsing of young trees and emerald ash borer activity, although the impact of these threats is not well defined at present.
