= Gracillaria arsenievi =

Scientific classification
- Domain: Eukaryota
- Kingdom: Animalia
- Phylum: Arthropoda
- Class: Insecta
- Order: Lepidoptera
- Family: Gracillariidae
- Genus: Gracillaria
- Species: G. arsenievi

Binomial name
- Gracillaria arsenievi (Ermolaev, 1977)

Synonyms
- Caloptilia arsenievi Ermolaev, 1977

Species of moth

Gracillaria arsenievi is a moth of the family Gracillariidae. It is known from the island of Hokkaidō in Japan and the Russian Far East.

The wingspan is 10.0-13.2 mm.

The larvae feed on Fraxinus americana, Fraxinus chinensis, Fraxinus mandshurica, Fraxinus pennsylvanica, Syringa amurensis, Syringa reticulata and Syringa vulgaris. They mine the leaves of their host plant.
