= Gracillaria ussuriella =

Scientific classification
- Domain: Eukaryota
- Kingdom: Animalia
- Phylum: Arthropoda
- Class: Insecta
- Order: Lepidoptera
- Family: Gracillariidae
- Genus: Gracillaria
- Species: G. ussuriella

Binomial name
- Gracillaria ussuriella (Ermolaev, 1977)

Synonyms
- Caloptilia ussuriella Ermolaev, 1977

Species of moth

Gracillaria ussuriella is a moth of the family Gracillariidae. It is known from the islands of Hokkaidō, Honshū and Kyūshū in Japan and the Russian Far East.

The wingspan is 9.8–12 mm.

The larvae feed on Fraxinus species, including Fraxinus americana, Fraxinus chinensis, Fraxinus mandshurica and Fraxinus pennsylvanica. They mine the leaves of their host plant.
