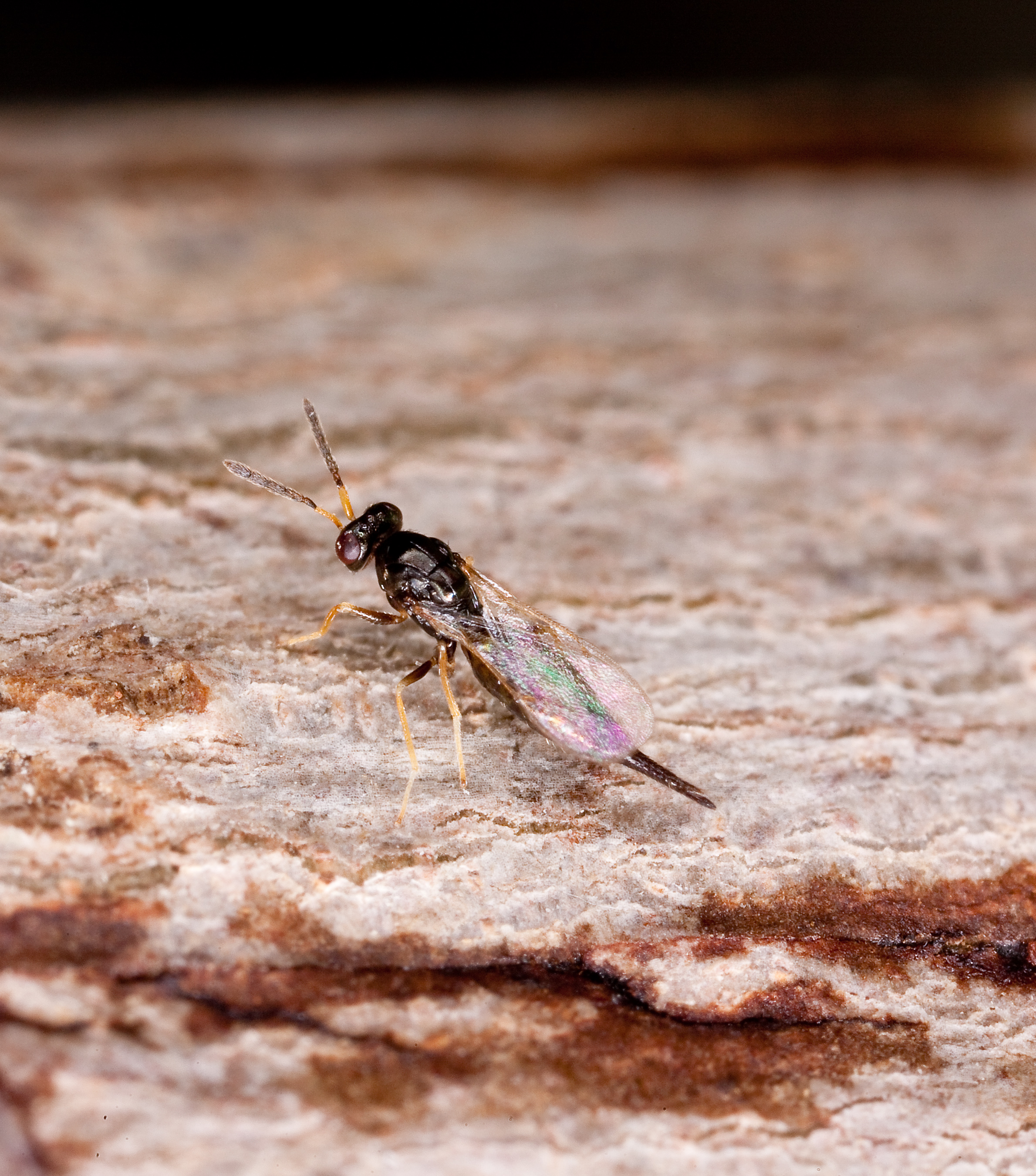

Scientific classification
- Kingdom: Animalia
- Phylum: Arthropoda
- Class: Insecta
- Order: Hymenoptera
- Family: Eulophidae
- Genus: Tetrastichus
- Species: T. planipennisi

Binomial name
- Tetrastichus planipennisi Yang, 2006

= Tetrastichus planipennisi =

Species of wasp

Tetrastichus planipennisi is a parasitic non-stinging wasp of the family Eulophidae which is native to North Asia. It is a parasitoid of the emerald ash borer (Agrilus planipennis Fairmaire, family Buprestidae), an invasive species which has destroyed tens of millions of ash trees in its introduced range in North America. As part of the campaign against the emerald ash borer (EAB), American scientists in conjunction with the Chinese Academy of Forestry searched since 2003 for its natural enemies in the wild leading to the discovery of several parasitoid wasps, including Tetrastichus planipennisi which is a gregarious endoparasitoid of EAB larvae on Manchurian Ash (Fraxinus mandschurica) and has been recorded to attack and kill up to 50 percent of EAB larvae.

== Life cycle ==
Tetrastichus planipennisi parasitize EAB larvae by drilling through the bark and laying eggs on its host. The hatching parasitoid larvae feed and develop on the EAB larva, resulting in its death. Tetrastichus completes at least four generations each year and one EAB larva can produce up to 127 Tetrastichus adults. Tetrastichus planipennisi survive the winter as larvae inside their host or host gallery under the bark of ash trees.

== Biological control ==
Tetrastichus planipennisi, a gregarious larval endoparasitoid, has been introduced and released into the United States of America as a possible biological control of the EAB along with two other wasps, Oobius agrili, a solitary, parthenogenic egg parasitoid, and Spathius agrili, a gregarious larval ectoparasitoid. However of the three, Tetrastichus planipennisi has shown best results in affecting EAB and establishing surviving populations.

Research on the viability of as an effective biocontrol agent is ongoing in the US and Canada. Laboratory methods have been developed for continuous rearing of this and other species of EAB parasitoid wasps. Extensive studies on the specificity of these parasitoids on native beetles and other insects has revealed that in laboratory no-choice assays, Tetrastichus attacked only actively feeding EAB larvae in ash branches and rejected all non-EAB species as hosts.
