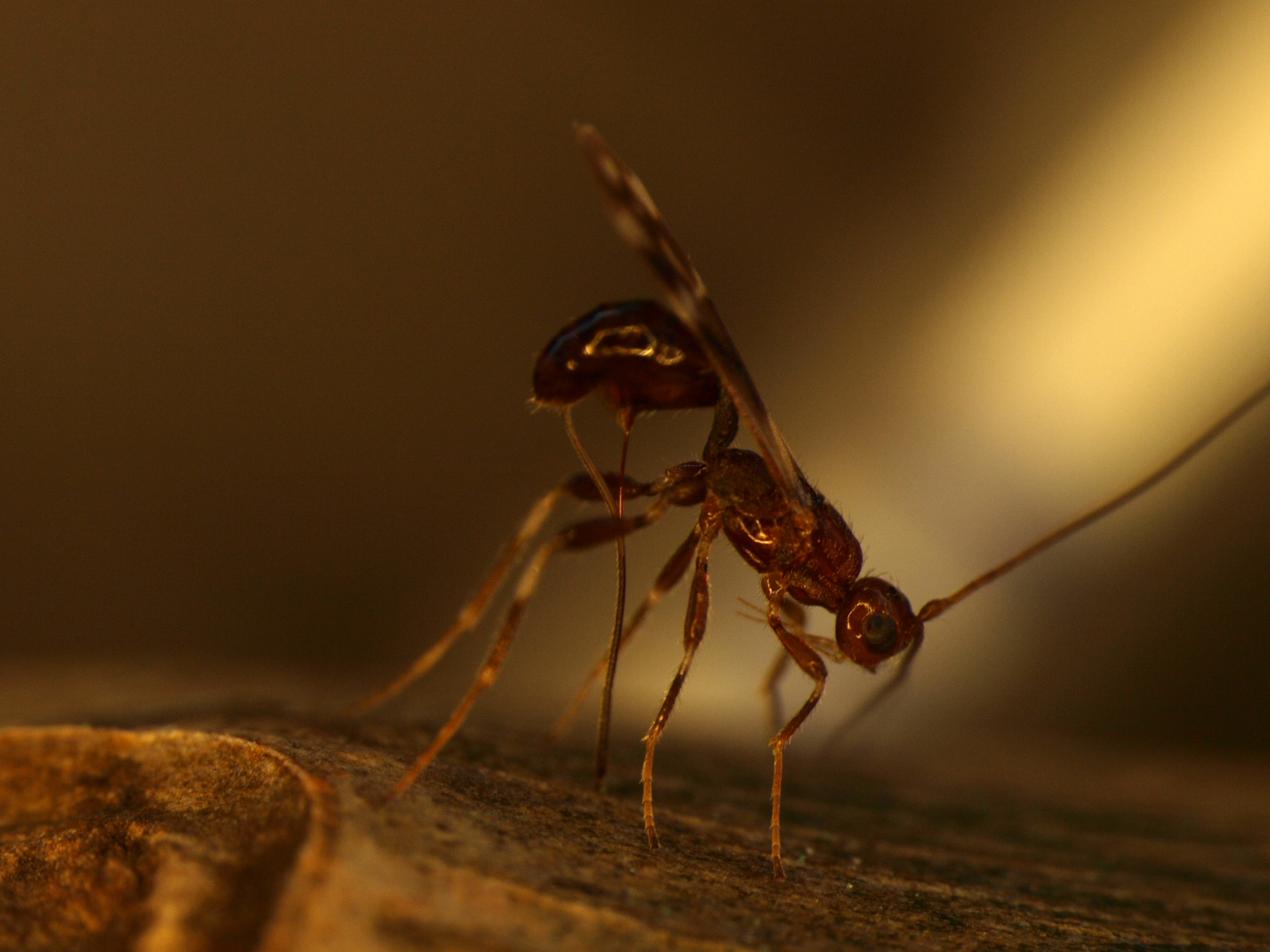
- Spathius galinae

Scientific classification
- Domain: Eukaryota
- Kingdom: Animalia
- Phylum: Arthropoda
- Class: Insecta
- Order: Hymenoptera
- Family: Braconidae
- Subfamily: Doryctinae
- Genus: Spathius; Nees, 1818

Species
- many, including: Spathius agrili; Spathius elegans; Spathius galinae; Spathius thorpei

Synonyms
- Spatheus

= Spathius =

Genus of insects

Spathius is a genus of doryctine wasps. The larvae of this genus of wasps feed on beetle larvae. They act as biological controllers of the certain pest beetles, such as Hylurgopinus rufipes and the emerald ash borer.
