= Gracillaria toubkalella =

Scientific classification
- Domain: Eukaryota
- Kingdom: Animalia
- Phylum: Arthropoda
- Class: Insecta
- Order: Lepidoptera
- Family: Gracillariidae
- Genus: Gracillaria
- Species: G. toubkalella

Binomial name
- Gracillaria toubkalella De Prins, 1985

Species of moth

Gracillaria toubkalella is a moth of the family Gracillariidae. It is known from Morocco.

The larvae feed on Fraxinus species. They mine the leaves of their host plant.
