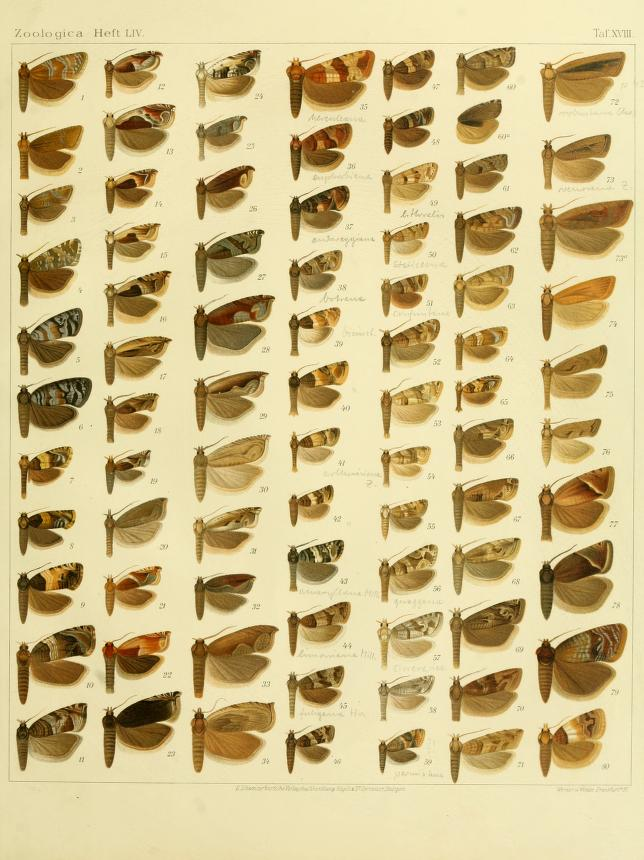
- Rhopalovalva exartemana in Kennel Die palaearktischen tortriciden figure 65, male

Scientific classification
- Domain: Eukaryota
- Kingdom: Animalia
- Phylum: Arthropoda
- Class: Insecta
- Order: Lepidoptera
- Family: Tortricidae
- Genus: Rhopalovalva
- Species: R. exartemana

Binomial name
- Rhopalovalva exartemana (Kennel, 1901)

Synonyms
- Acroclita exartemana Kennel, 1901

= Rhopalovalva exartemana =

Species of moth

Rhopalovalva exartemana is a species of moth of the family Tortricidae. It is found in China (Heilongjiang), Korea, Japan and Russia.
