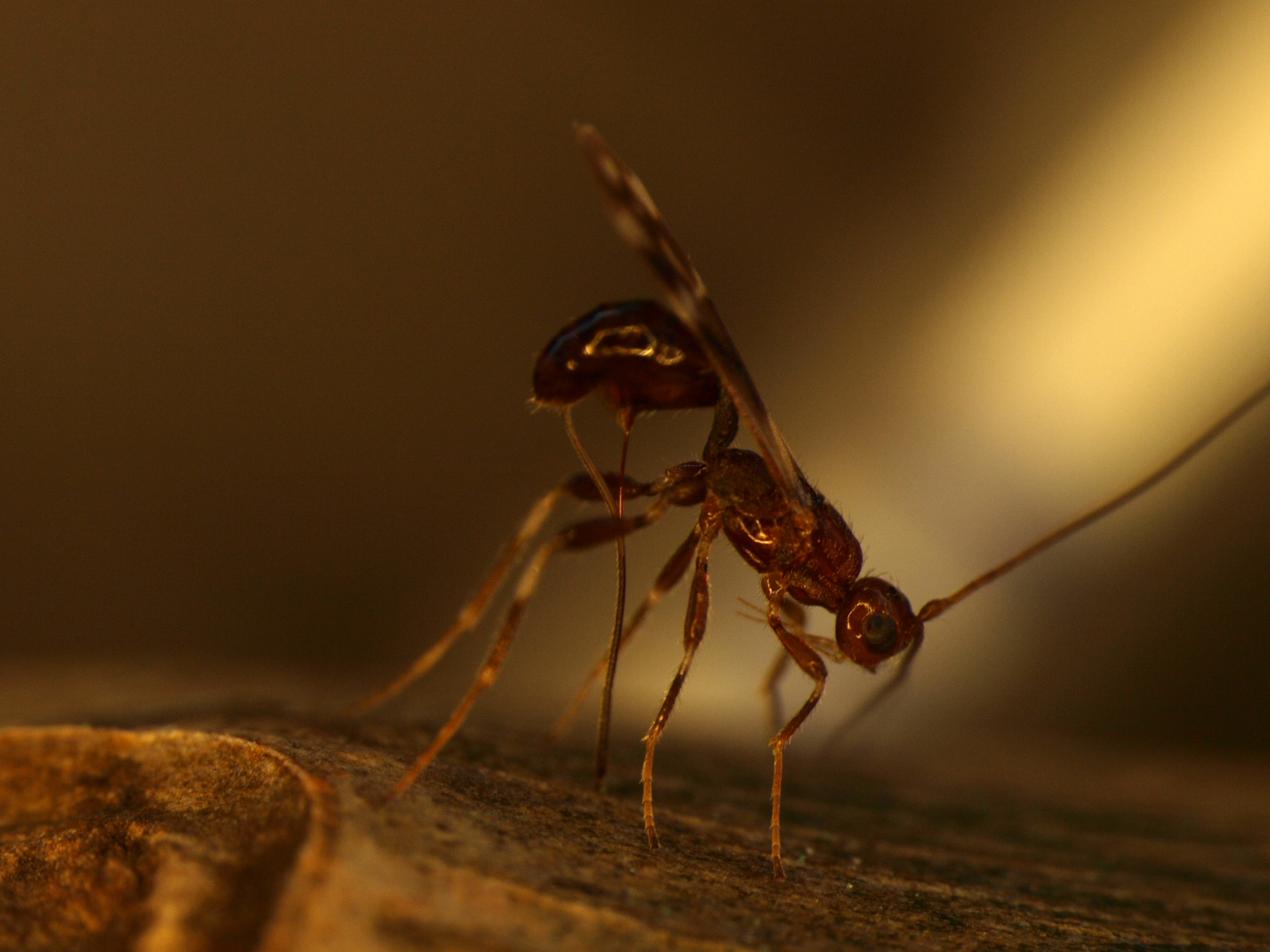

Scientific classification
- Domain: Eukaryota
- Kingdom: Animalia
- Phylum: Arthropoda
- Class: Insecta
- Order: Hymenoptera
- Family: Braconidae
- Genus: Spathius
- Species: S. galinae

Binomial name
- Spathius galinae Belokobylskij & Strazanac 2012

= Spathius galinae =

Species of wasp

Spathius galinae is a parasitoid of the emerald ash borer. The known range of S. galinae extends from the Russian Far East to South Korea. It is currently approved for release in some areas of North America as part of a biological control program against the emerald ash borer.

Beginning in early spring, adults lay eggs on host larvae by drilling into the tree with their ovipositor to reach the larva underneath the bark. The eggs hatch and consume the host larva. S. galinae larvae and pupae develop within the host gallery and emerge in approximately 35 days. Two to three generations occur per year. Prior to winter, pre-pupae halt development to enter diapause and overwinter within the tree.
