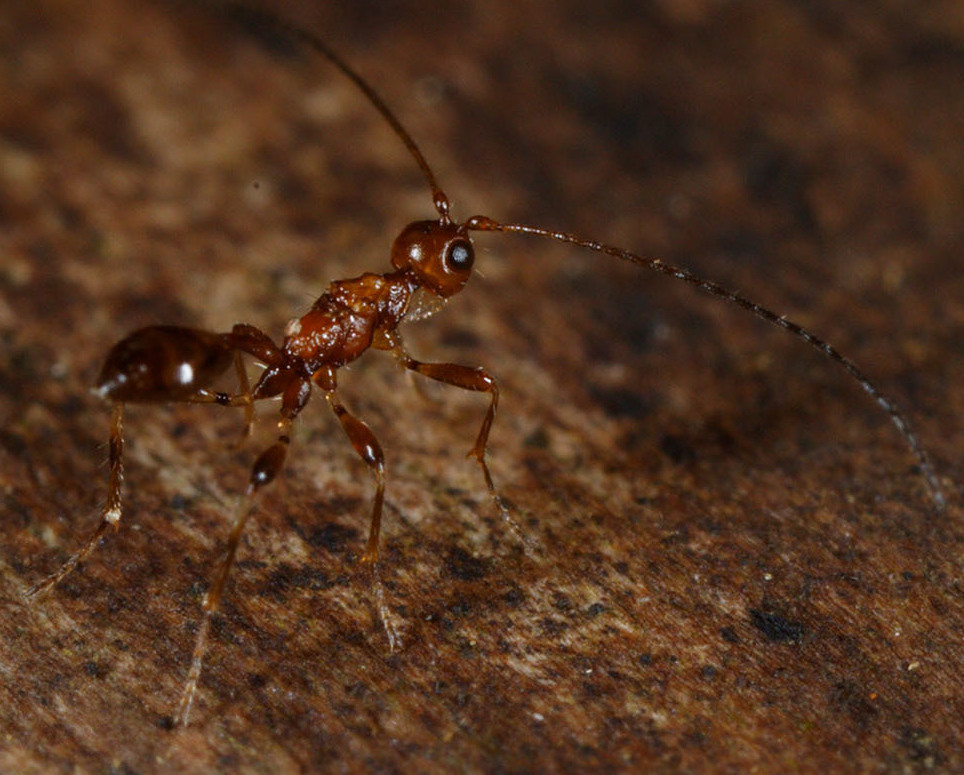
- Spathius thorpei seen at the Auckland Botanic Gardens

Conservation status
- Data Deficient (NZ TCS)

Scientific classification
- Domain: Eukaryota
- Kingdom: Animalia
- Phylum: Arthropoda
- Class: Insecta
- Order: Hymenoptera
- Family: Braconidae
- Genus: Spathius
- Species: S. thorpei

Binomial name
- Spathius thorpei Belokobylskij and Austin, 2013

= Spathius thorpei =

Species of wasp

Spathius thorpei is a species of parasitoid wasp belonging to the family Braconidae. The species was first described by Sergey A. Belokobylskij and Andrew D. Austin in 2013, and is endemic to New Zealand.

== Taxonomy ==
The species was identified by Polish entomologist Sergey A. Belokobylskij and Australian entomologist Andrew D. Austin in 2013, based on a holotype collected by Stephen E. Thorpe in April 2003, from sedges in the Auckland Domain, Auckland, New Zealand. Belokobylskij and Austin named the species after Thorpe.

== Description ==
Females of S. thorpei have a body length of 3.2 mm (0.13 in), while males measure 2.2 mm (0.087 in). The species has glabrous eyes, slender antennae, and is reddish brown in colour. The species can be differentiated by its distinctly sculptured vertex and frons, and by having a long and narrow mesosoma.

== Distribution and habitat ==
The species is endemic to New Zealand.
