= Gracillaria loriolella =

Scientific classification
- Kingdom: Animalia
- Phylum: Arthropoda
- Class: Insecta
- Order: Lepidoptera
- Family: Gracillariidae
- Genus: Gracillaria
- Species: G. loriolella

Binomial name
- Gracillaria loriolella Frey, 1881

Synonyms
- Gracillaria norvegicellum (Haanshus, 1933); Coriscium norvegiellum Wocke, 1893; Gracillaria rebeli Klemensiewicz, 1896

Species of moth

Gracillaria loriolella is a moth of the family Gracillariidae. It is known from Norway, France, Switzerland, Austria, the Czech Republic, Poland, Hungary, Moldova, the European part of Russia, Ukraine, Tajikistan, Turkmenistan.

The larvae feed on Fraxinus species, including Fraxinus potamophila.
