= Spathius elegans =

Scientific classification
- Domain: Eukaryota
- Kingdom: Animalia
- Phylum: Arthropoda
- Class: Insecta
- Order: Hymenoptera
- Family: Braconidae
- Genus: Spathius
- Species: S. elegans

Binomial name
- Spathius elegans Matthews, 1970

Species of wasp

Spathius elegans is a species of doryctine wasp. It is widespread in the eastern United States. It is an ectoparasite of larvae of the sawfly genus Xiphydria.
