= Black ash =

Black ash is a common name for several plants and may refer to:

- Acer negundo, native to North America
- Fraxinus nigra, native to North America
- Eucalyptus sieberi, native to Australia
