= Gracillaria verina =

Scientific classification
- Domain: Eukaryota
- Kingdom: Animalia
- Phylum: Arthropoda
- Class: Insecta
- Order: Lepidoptera
- Family: Gracillariidae
- Genus: Gracillaria
- Species: G. verina

Binomial name
- Gracillaria verina Clarke, 1971

Species of moth

Gracillaria verina is a moth of the family Gracillariidae. It is known from Rapa Iti in French Polynesia.

The wingspan is 10 mm.
