= Rhopalovalva =

Scientific classification
- Domain: Eukaryota
- Kingdom: Animalia
- Phylum: Arthropoda
- Class: Insecta
- Order: Lepidoptera
- Family: Tortricidae
- Tribe: Eucosmini
- Genus: Rhopalovalva; Kuznetzov, 1964

Genus of tortrix moths

Rhopalovalva is a genus of moths belonging to the subfamily Olethreutinae of the family Tortricidae.

== Species ==
- Rhopalovalva amabilis Oku, 1974
- Rhopalovalva connata Zhang & Li, 2017
- Rhopalovalva exartemana (Kennel, 1901)
- Rhopalovalva grapholitana (Caradja, 1916)
- Rhopalovalva lascivana (Christoph, 1882)
- Rhopalovalva macrocuculla Zhang & Li, 2017
- Rhopalovalva moriutii Oku, 2005
- Rhopalovalva orbiculata Zhang & Li, 2004
- Rhopalovalva ovata Zhang & Li, 2004
- Rhopalovalva pulchra (Butler, 1879)
- Rhopalovalva rhombea Zhang & Li, 2010
- Rhopalovalva triangulata Zhang & Li, 2010

== See also ==
- List of Tortricidae genera
