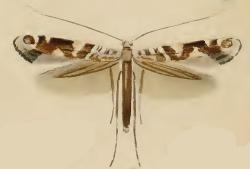
- G. syringella

Scientific classification
- Kingdom: Animalia
- Phylum: Arthropoda
- Clade: Pancrustacea
- Class: Insecta
- Order: Lepidoptera
- Family: Gracillariidae
- Subfamily: Gracillariinae
- Genus: Gracillaria; Haworth, 1828

Species
- See text

Synonyms
- Gracilaria Zeller, 1839; Gracilaria Walsingham, 1907; Xanthospilapteryx Spuler, 1910

= Gracillaria =

Genus of moths

Gracillaria is a genus of moths in the family Gracillariidae.

== Species ==
- Gracillaria albicapitata Issiki, 1930
- Gracillaria arsenievi (Ermolaev, 1977)
- Gracillaria chalcanthes (Meyrick, 1894)
- Gracillaria japonica Kumata, 1982
- Gracillaria loriolella Frey, 1881
- Gracillaria syringella (Fabricius, 1794)
- Gracillaria toubkalella De Prins, 1985
- Gracillaria ussuriella (Ermolaev, 1977)
- Gracillaria verina Clarke, 1971
