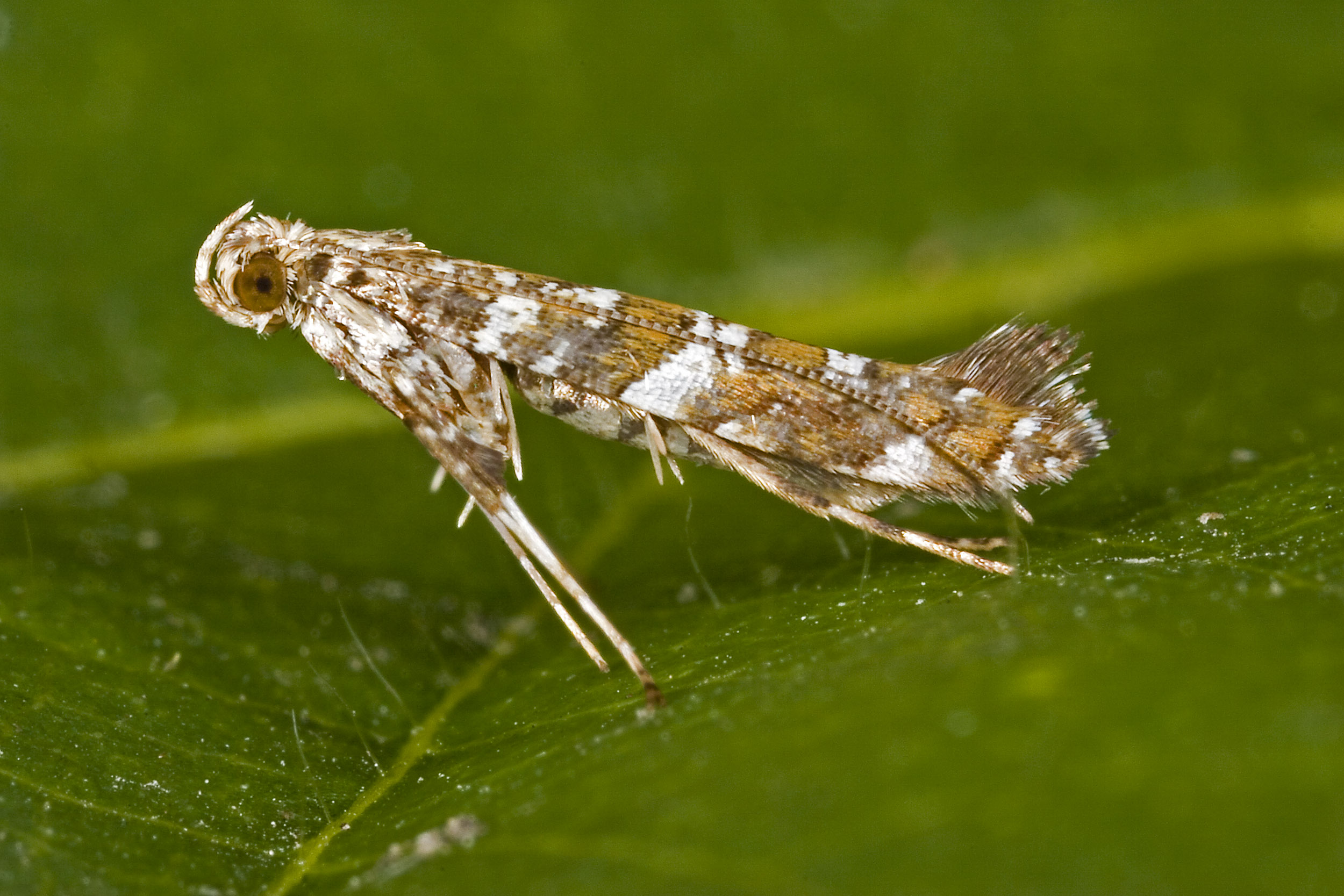

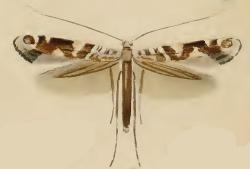

Scientific classification
- Kingdom: Animalia
- Phylum: Arthropoda
- Class: Insecta
- Order: Lepidoptera
- Family: Gracillariidae
- Genus: Gracillaria
- Species: G. syringella

Binomial name
- Gracillaria syringella (Fabricius, 1794)

Synonyms
- Caloptilia syringella

= Gracillaria syringella =

Species of moth

Gracillaria syringella (lilac leafminer or privet leafminer) is a moth of the family Gracillariidae. It is found in Europe. It has been introduced in North America.

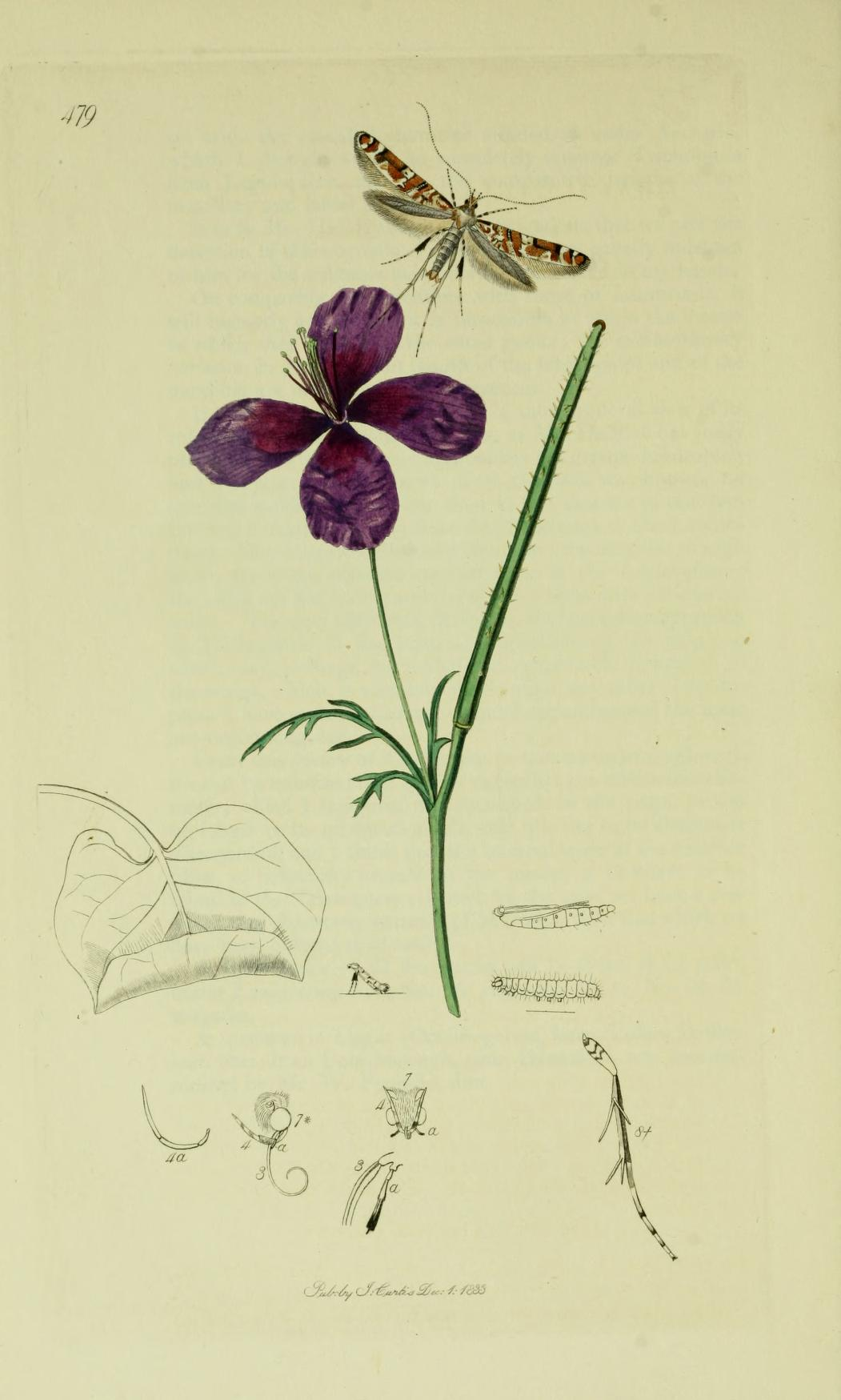
Illustration from John Curtis's British Entomology Volume 6

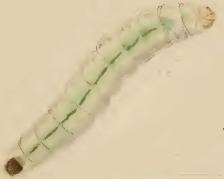
Larva

The wingspan is 10–13 mm. The forewings are light yellowbrownish, towards base with whitish and dark fuscous strigulae; an oblique interrupted fascia about 1/4, a somewhat angulated median fascia (sometimes followed by a small costal spot), a tornal spot, a spot on costa beyond, and costal and terminal dots near apex white, black-margined; a blackish discal suffusion beyond middle. Hindwings are rather dark grey.The larva is whitish, sometimes greenish-tinged; dorsal line darker green; head brownish-tinged.

The moth flies in May and again in July depending on the location.

The caterpillars feed on ash (Fraxinus), privet (Ligustrum) and lilac (Syringa)
