= Rhopalovalva grapholitana =

Scientific classification
- Domain: Eukaryota
- Kingdom: Animalia
- Phylum: Arthropoda
- Class: Insecta
- Order: Lepidoptera
- Family: Tortricidae
- Genus: Rhopalovalva
- Species: R. grapholitana

Binomial name
- Rhopalovalva grapholitana (Caradja, 1916)

Synonyms
- Acroclita grapholitana Caradja, 1916; Acroclita cordelia Meyrick, in Caradja & Meyrick, 1935

Species of moth

Rhopalovalva grapholitana is a species of moth of the family Tortricidae. It is found in China (Hebei, north-eastern China, Shanghai, Anhui, Jiangxi, Henan, Shaanxi, Gansu, Ningxia), Korea and Russia.

The larvae feed on Lespedeza bicolor.
