= Rhopalovalva lascivana =

Scientific classification
- Domain: Eukaryota
- Kingdom: Animalia
- Phylum: Arthropoda
- Class: Insecta
- Order: Lepidoptera
- Family: Tortricidae
- Genus: Rhopalovalva
- Species: R. lascivana

Binomial name
- Rhopalovalva lascivana (Christoph, 1881)

Synonyms
- Eudemis lascivana Christoph, 1881

Species of moth

Rhopalovalva lascivana is a species of moth of the family Tortricidae. It is found in China (Guizhou), Korea, Japan and the Russian Far East.

The wingspan is 15–18 mm.

The larvae feed on Quercus mongolica.
