= Rhopalovalva ovata =

Scientific classification
- Domain: Eukaryota
- Kingdom: Animalia
- Phylum: Arthropoda
- Class: Insecta
- Order: Lepidoptera
- Family: Tortricidae
- Genus: Rhopalovalva
- Species: R. ovata

Binomial name
- Rhopalovalva ovata Zhang & Li, 2004

Species of moth

Rhopalovalva ovata is a species of moth of the family Tortricidae. It is found in China (Henan, Hunan).

The wingspan is about 14 mm.
