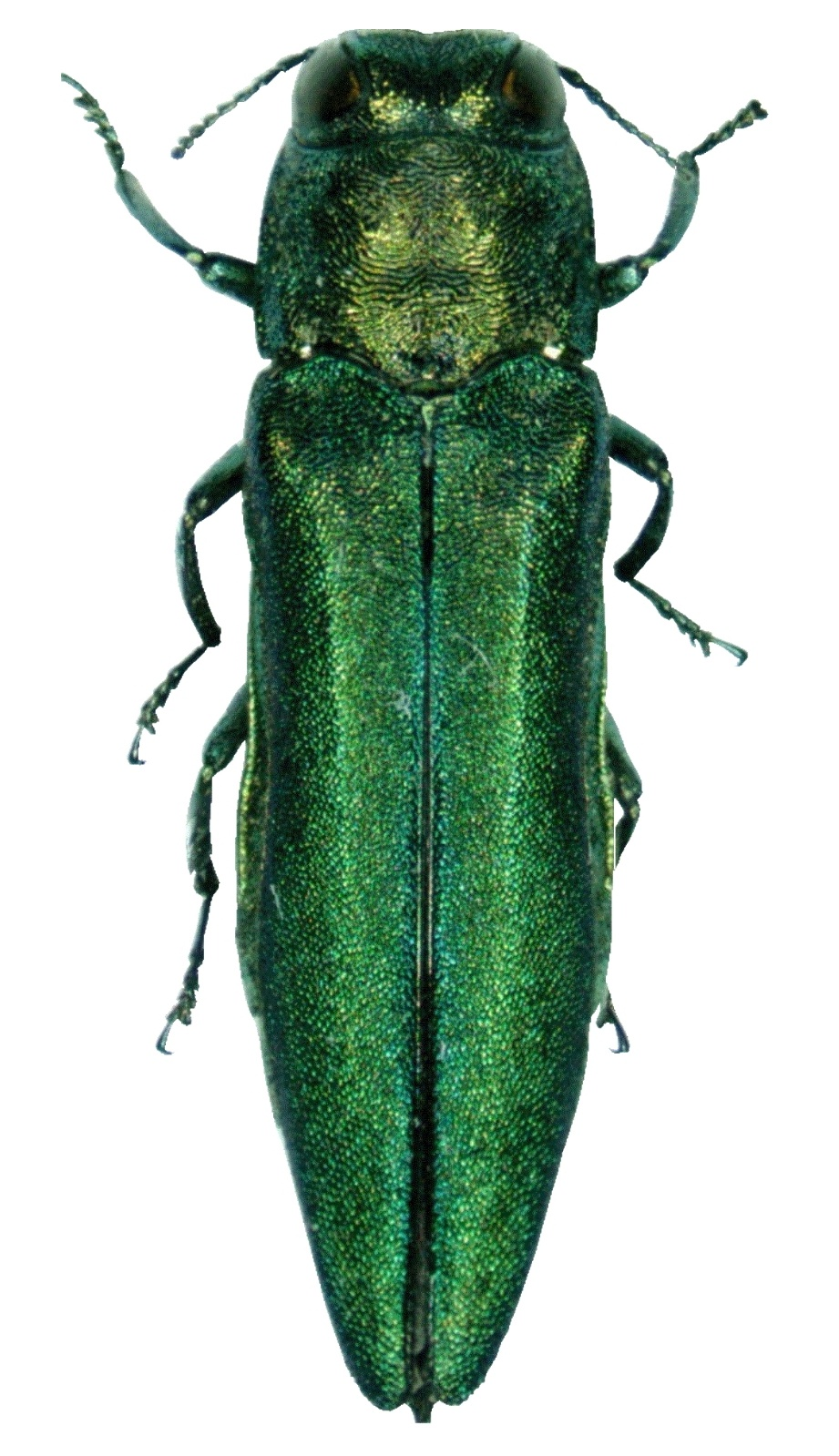

Scientific classification
- Kingdom: Animalia
- Phylum: Arthropoda
- Clade: Pancrustacea
- Class: Insecta
- Order: Coleoptera
- Suborder: Polyphaga
- Infraorder: Elateriformia
- Family: Buprestidae
- Genus: Agrilus
- Species: A. planipennis

Binomial name
- Agrilus planipennis Fairmaire, 1888

Synonyms
- Agrilus feretrius Obenberger; Agrilus marcopoli Obenberger

= Emerald ash borer =

Species of beetle

The emerald ash borer (Agrilus planipennis), also known by the abbreviation EAB, is a green buprestid or jewel beetle native to north-eastern Asia that feeds on ash species (Fraxinus spp.). Females lay eggs in bark crevices on ash trees, and larvae feed underneath the bark of ash trees to emerge as adults in one to two years. In its native range, it is typically found at low densities and does not cause significant damage to trees native to the area. Outside its native range, it is an invasive species and is highly destructive to ash trees native to Europe and North America. Before it was found in North America, very little was known about the emerald ash borer in its native range; this has resulted in much of the research on its biology being focused in North America. Local governments in North America are attempting to control it by monitoring its spread, diversifying tree species, and through the use of insecticides and biological control.

== History ==
French priest and naturalist Armand David collected a specimen of the species during one of his trips through Imperial China in the 1860s and 1870s. He found the beetle in Beijing and sent it to France, where the first brief description of Agrilus planipennis by entomologist Léon Fairmaire was published in the Revue d'Entomologie in 1888. Unaware of Fairmaire's description, a separate description naming the species as Agrilus marcopoli was published in 1930 by Jan Obenberger.

== Identification ==
Adult beetles are typically bright metallic green and about 8.5 mm (0.33 in) long and 1.6 mm (0.063 in) wide. Elytra are typically a darker green, but can have copper hues. The emerald ash borer is the only North American species of Agrilus with a bright red upper abdomen when viewed with the wings and elytra spread. The species has a small spine at the tip of the abdomen, and serrated antennae that begin at the fourth antennal segment. They leave tracks below the bark in the trees they damage that are sometimes visible. Adult beetles of other species are often misidentified by the public.

== Life cycle ==
The emerald ash borer life cycle can occur over one or two years depending on the time of year of oviposition, the health of the tree, and temperature.

After 400–500 accumulated degree-days above 10 °C (50 °F), adults begin to emerge from trees in late spring, and peak emergence occurs around 1,000 degree-days. After emergence, adults feed for one week on ash leaves in the canopy before mating, but cause little defoliation. Males hover around trees, locate females by visual cues, and drop directly onto the female to mate. Mating can last up to 50 minutes, and females may mate with multiple males over their lifespans. A typical female can live around six weeks and lay around 40–70 eggs; females that live longer can lay up to 200 eggs.

Eggs are deposited in bark crevices, flakes, or cracks and hatch about two weeks later. Eggs are roughly 0.6 to 1.0 mm (0.02 to 0.04 in) in diameter, and are initially white, later turning reddish-brown if fertile. After hatching, larvae chew through the bark to the inner phloem, cambium, and outer xylem, where they feed and develop. Emerald ash borers have four larval instars. By feeding, larvae create long, serpentine galleries. Fully mature fourth-instar larvae are 26 to 32 mm (1.0 to 1.3 in) long. In fall, mature fourth-instars excavate chambers about 1.25 cm (0.49 in) into the sapwood or outer bark where they fold into a J-shape. These J-shaped larvae shorten into prepupae and develop into pupae and adults the following spring. To exit the tree, adults chew holes from their chambers through the bark, which leaves a characteristic D-shaped exit hole. Immature larvae can overwinter in their larval gallery, but can require an additional summer of feeding before overwintering again and emerging as adults the following spring. This two-year life cycle is more common in cool climates, such as European Russia.

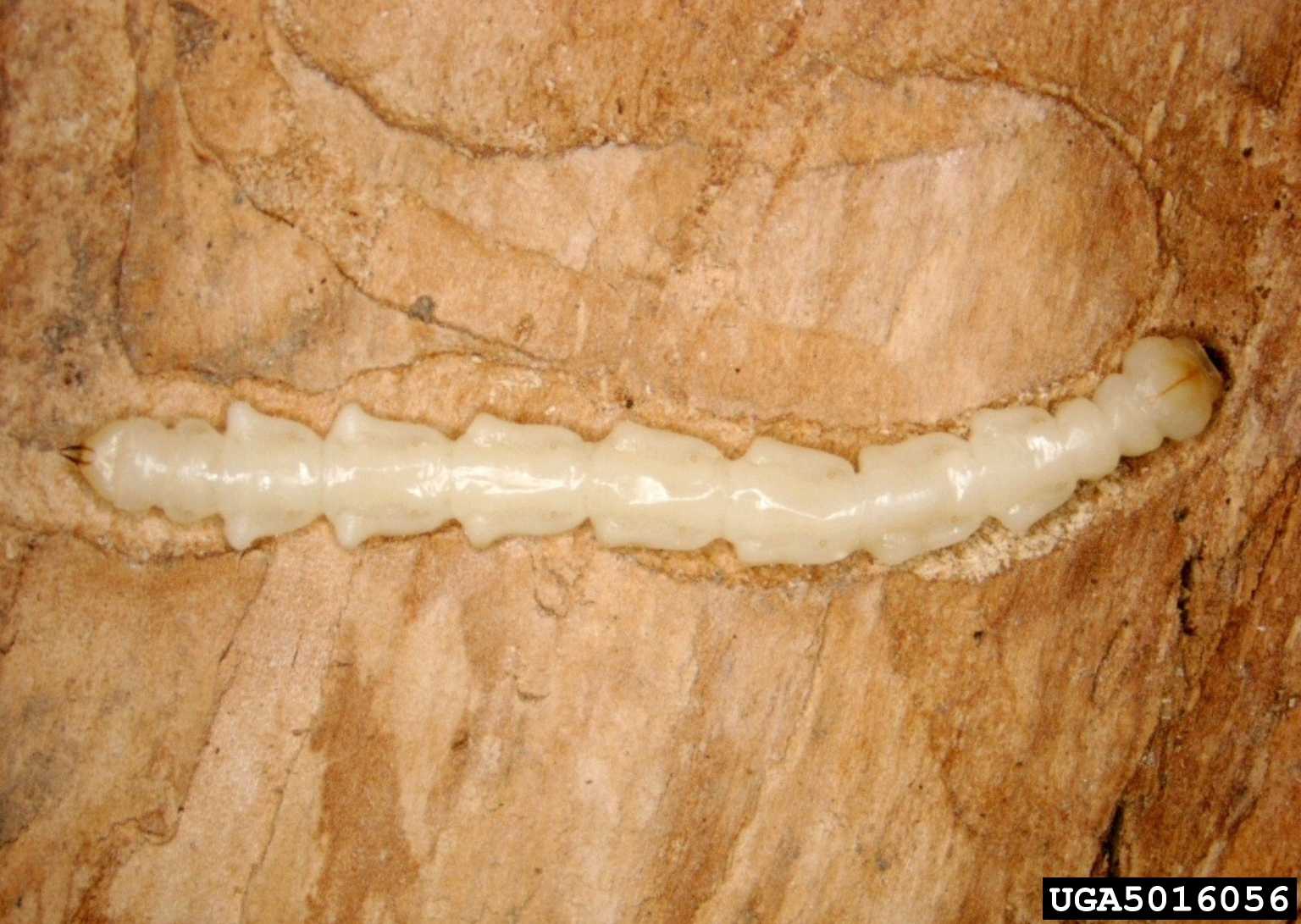
Larva

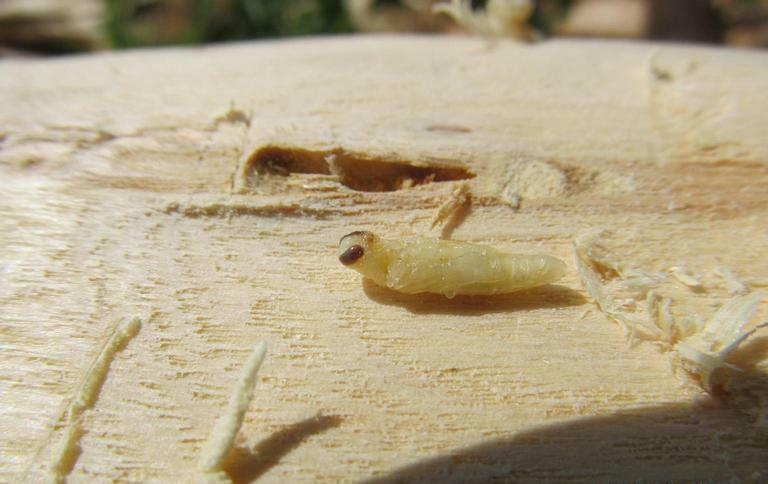
Pupa removed from its pupal chamber

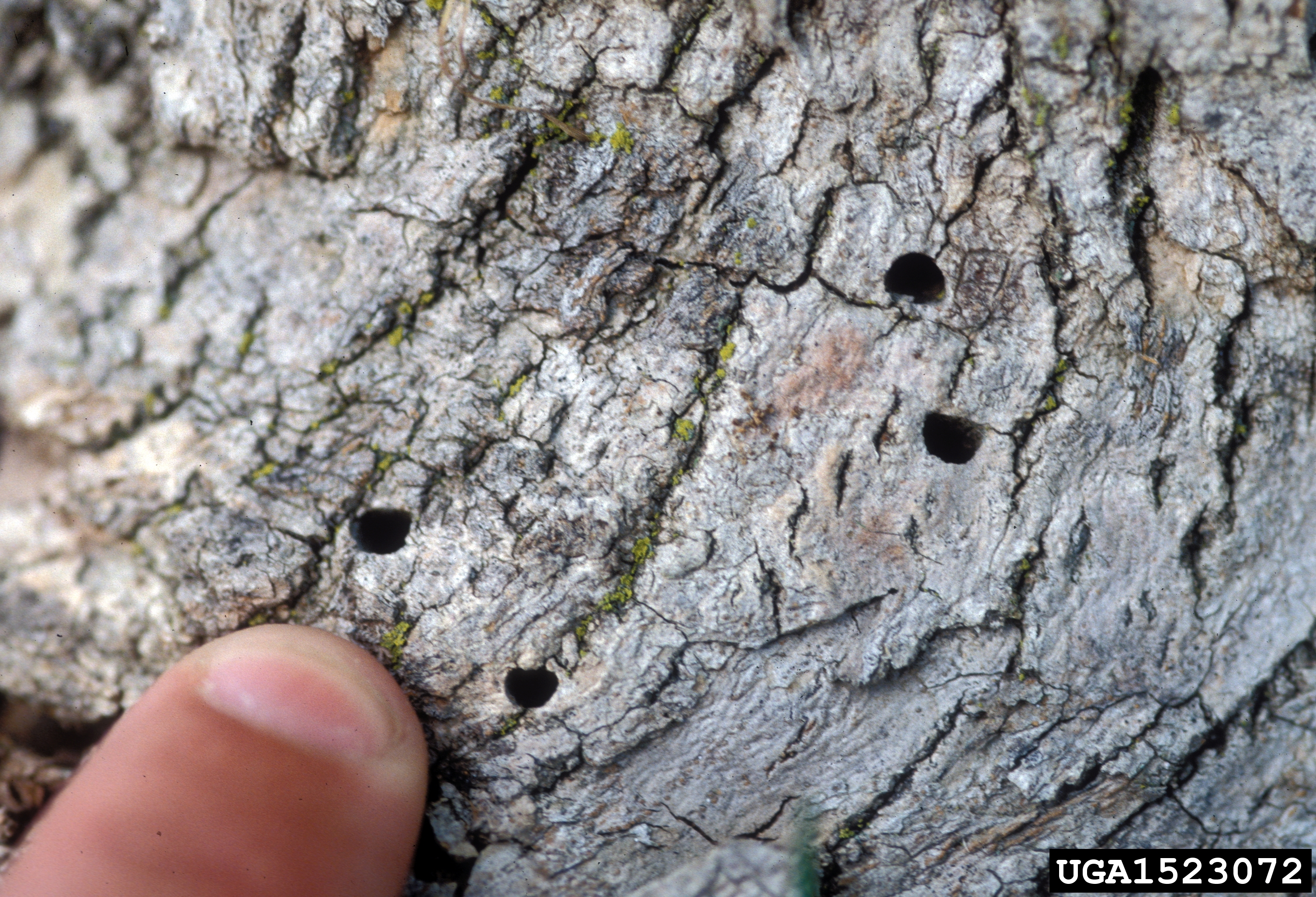
Adults exit the tree from D-shaped holes.

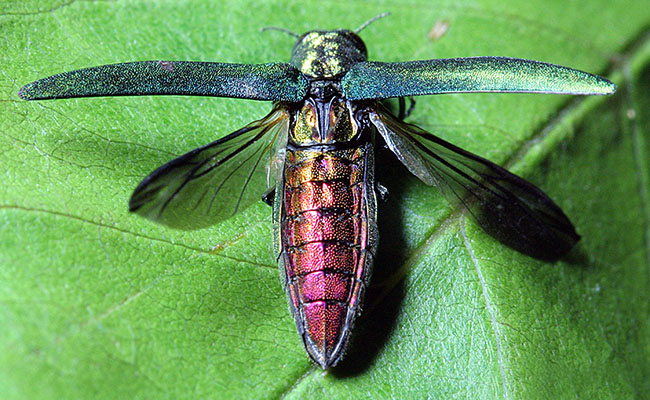
Dorsal view of adult with elytra and wings spread

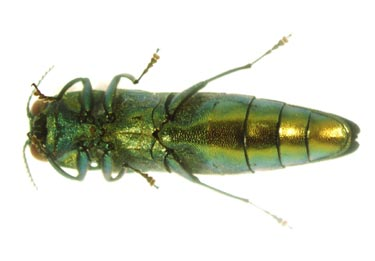
Underside of an adult emerald ash borer

== Range ==
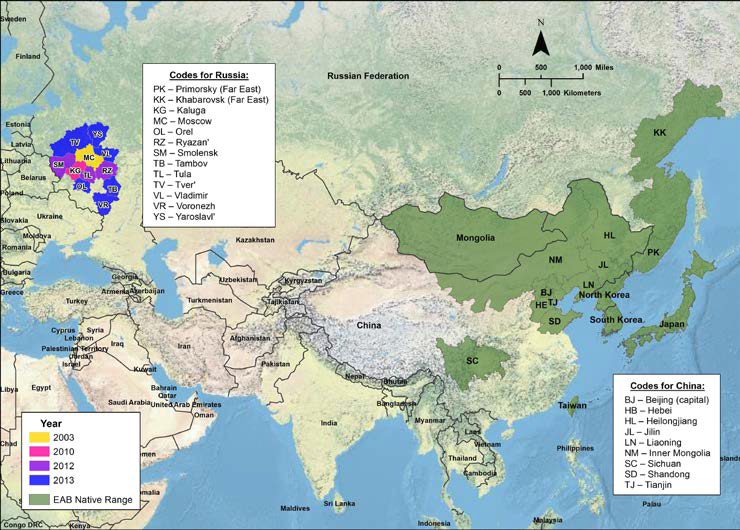
Native range of emerald ash borer in eastern Asia and introduced range in European Russia as of 2013

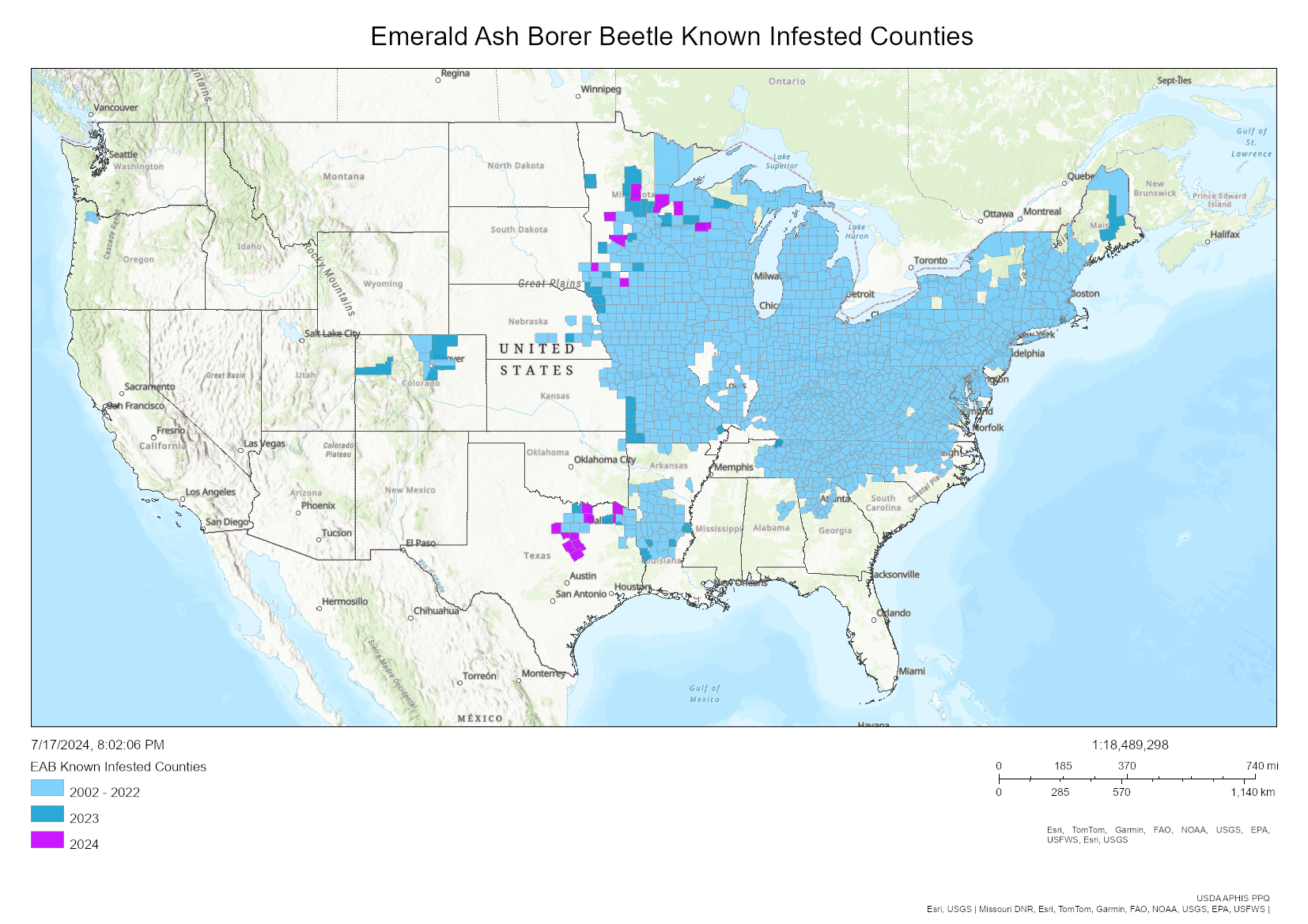
Map of US counties infested with emerald ash borer as of July 2024

The native range of the emerald ash borer is temperate north-eastern Asia, which includes Russia, Mongolia, northern China, Japan, and Korea.

The beetle is invasive in North America, where it has a core population in Michigan and surrounding states and provinces. Populations are more scattered outside the core area, and the edges of its known distribution range north to Ontario, south to northern Louisiana, west to Nebraska, and east to New Brunswick. Satellite populations exist in Colorado and in the Pacific Northwest in Oregon. In eastern Europe, a population was found in Moscow in 2003. From 2003 to 2016, this population has spread west towards the European Union at up to 40 km (25 mi) per year and is expected to reach central Europe between 2031 and 2036. Although not recorded from the European Union as of 2019, it has already spread to far eastern Ukraine from neighboring Russia. In 2026 Hungarian authorities collected two adult specimens in a pheromone trap.

== Host plants ==
In its native range, emerald ash borer is only a nuisance pest on native trees, as population densities typically do not reach levels lethal to healthy trees. In China, it infests native Fraxinus chinensis, F. mandshurica, and F. rhynchophylla; in Japan it also infests F. japonica and F. lanuginosa.

Emerald ash borer primarily infest and can cause significant damage to ash species including green ash (F. pennsylvanica), black ash (F. nigra), white ash (F. americana), and blue ash (F. quadrangulata) in North America. In Europe, F. excelsior is the main ash species colonized, which is moderately resistant to emerald ash borer infestation. Ash susceptibility can vary depending on the attractiveness of chemical volatiles to adults, or the ability of larvae to detoxify phenolic compounds. Emerald ash borer has been found infesting white fringe tree in North America, which is a non-ash host, but it is unclear whether the trees were healthy when first infested, or were already in decline because of drought. Another non-ash host has been discovered, Olea europaea, albeit in a lab setting.

Adults prefer to lay eggs on open grown or stressed ash but readily lay eggs on healthy trees amongst other tree species. Ashes that grow in pure stands, whether naturally occurring or in landscaping, are more prone to attack than isolated trees or those in mixed forest stands. Ashes used in landscaping tend to be subjected to higher amounts of environmental stresses including compacted soil, lack of moisture, heating effects from urban islands, road salt, and pollution, which may reduce their resistance to the borer. Furthermore, most ashes used in landscaping are produced from a handful of cultivars, resulting in low genetic diversity. Young trees with bark between 1.5 mm (0.059 in) to 5 mm (0.20 in) are preferred. Both males and females use leaf volatiles and sesquiterpenes in the bark to locate hosts. Damage occurs in infested trees by larval feeding. The serpentine feeding galleries of the larvae disrupt the flow of nutrients and water, effectively girdling, thus killing the tree, as it cannot transport water and nutrients to the leaves. Girdled ashes will often attempt to regenerate through stump sprouting, and there is evidence that stressed trees may generate higher than normal seed crops as an emergency measure.

== Invasiveness ==
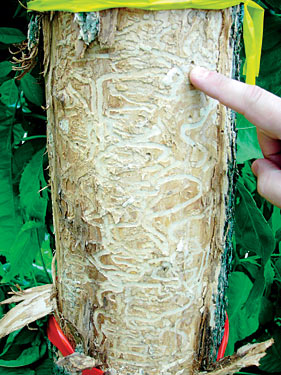
A green ash killed by emerald ash borers

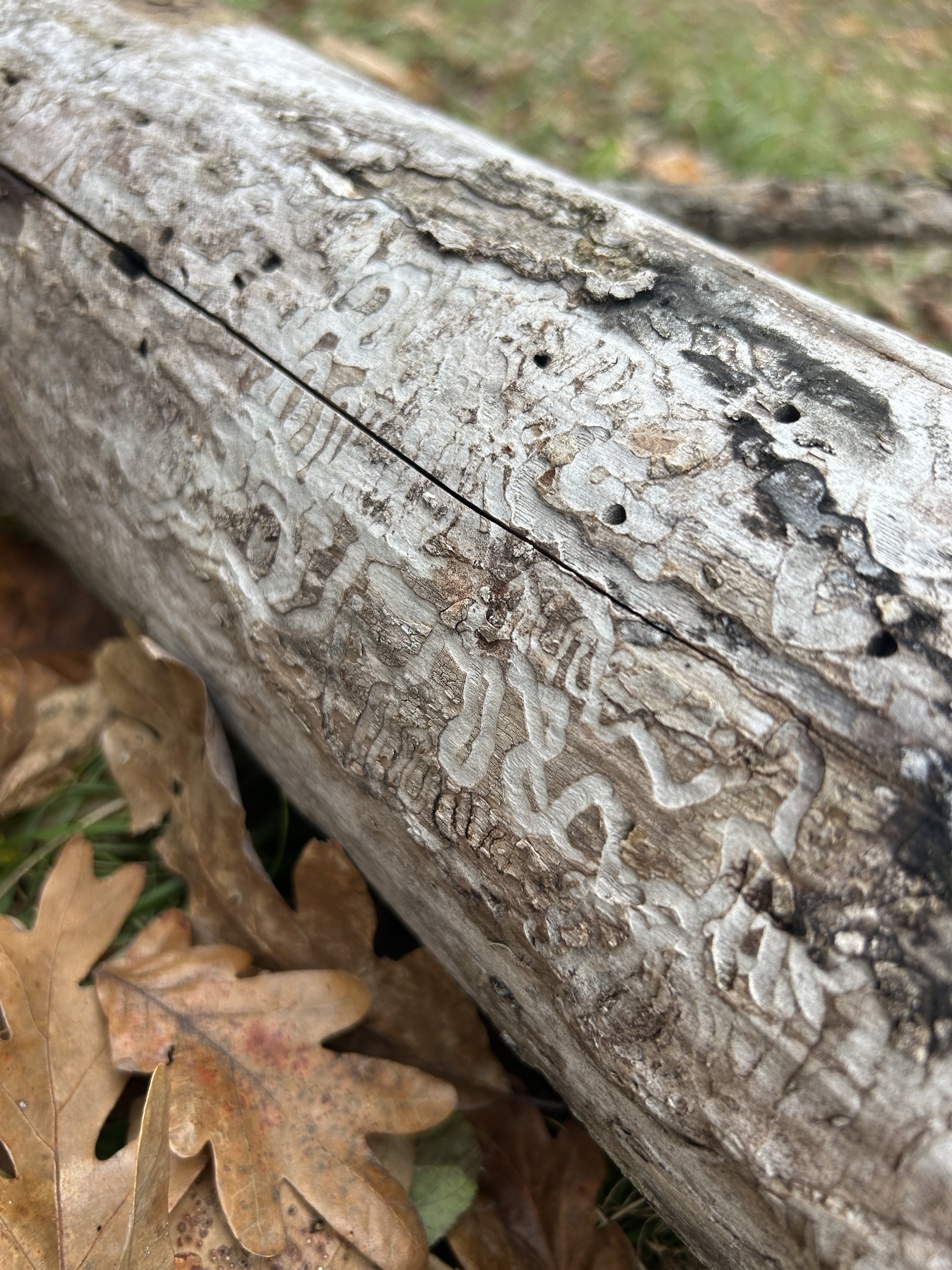
Seen here: scarring left behind by emerald ash borer larvae on a dead ash tree trunk, this one photographed after the tree fell naturally and lost its bark in southeastern Wisconsin.

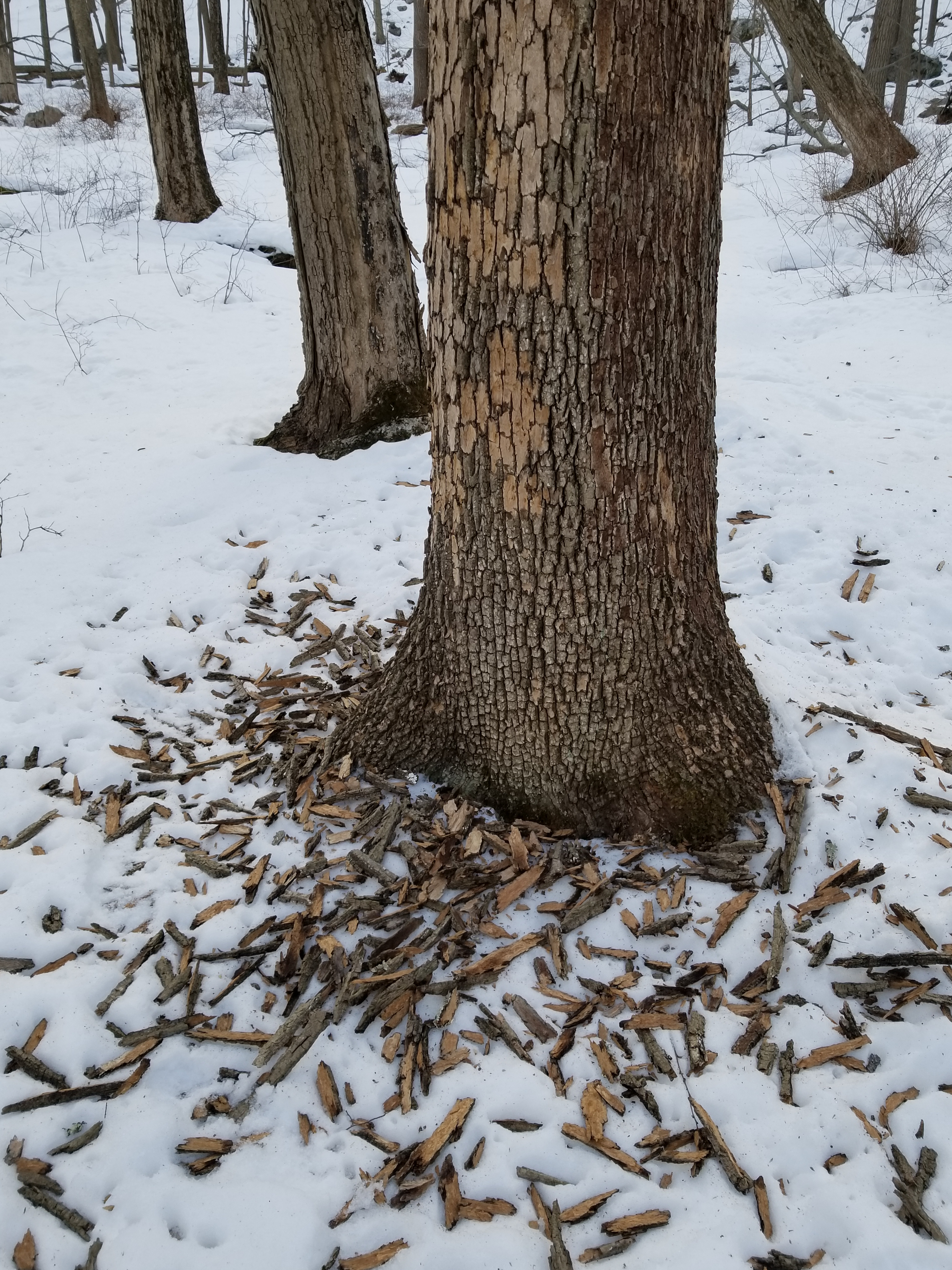
A swamp ash with bark stripped by woodpeckers feeding on emerald ash borers

Outside its native range, emerald ash borer is an invasive species that is highly destructive to ash trees in its introduced range. Before the emerald ash borer was found in North America, very little was known about the insect in its native range aside from a short description of life-history traits and taxonomic descriptions, which resulted in focused research on its biology in North America. The insect was first identified in Canton, Michigan, in 2002, but it may have been in the U.S. since the late 1980s. It is suspected that it was introduced from overseas in shipping materials such as packing crates.

Without factors that would normally suppress emerald ash borer populations in its native range (e.g., resistant trees, predators, and parasitoid wasps), populations can quickly rise to damaging levels. After initial infestation of an area and without control measures, all ash trees are expected to die within 10 years. Every North American ash species is susceptible to the emerald ash borer, but some Asian ash species are resistant, including F. baroniana, F. chinensis, F. floribunda, F. mandshurica, and F. platypoda.

Green ash and black ash trees are preferred by emerald ash borer. White ash is also killed rapidly but usually only after all green and black ash trees are eliminated. Blue ash exhibits a higher degree of resistance to emerald ash borer, believed to be caused by the leaves' high tannin content, making the foliage unpalatable to the insect. While most Asian ashes have evolved this defense, it is absent from American species other than blue ash. Researchers have examined populations of so-called "lingering ash", trees that have survived ash borer attack with little or no damage, for the grafting or breeding of new, resistant stock. Many lingering ashes have unusual phenotypes that may increase resistance. Aside from their higher tannin content, Asian ashes employ natural defenses to repel, trap, and kill emerald ash borer larvae. Although studies of American ashes have suggested that they are capable of mustering similar defensive mechanisms, the trees do not appear to recognize when they are under attack. Many of the specialized predators and parasitoids that suppress emerald ash borers in Asia are not present in North America. Predators and parasitoids native to North America do not sufficiently suppress emerald ash borers, so populations continue to grow. Birds such as woodpeckers feed on emerald ash borer larvae, although the adult beetles have not been used by any American fauna as food. Emerald ash borer populations can spread 2.5 to 20 km (1.6 to 12.4 mi) per year. It primarily spreads through flight or by transportation of ash bark contained in products such as firewood or nursery stock, which allows it to reach new areas and create satellite populations outside of the main infestation.

Other factors can limit spread. Winter temperatures around −38 °C (−36 °F) limit range expansion, and overwintering emerald ash borers survive down to average temperatures of −30 °C (−22 °F) because of antifreeze chemicals in the body and insulation provided by tree bark. Larvae can survive high heat up to 53 °C (127 °F). Conversely, much like ashes grown in the nursery trade, the population of emerald ash borers in North America is believed to have originated from a single group of insects from central China and exhibits low genetic diversity.

North American predators and parasitoids can occasionally cause high emerald ash borer mortality, but generally offer only limited control. Mortality from native woodpeckers is variable. Parasitism by parasitoids such as Atanycolus cappaerti can be high, but overall such control is generally low.

The United States Department of Agriculture's Animal and Plant Health Inspection Service published a rule on 14 December 2020, ending all EAB quarantine activities in the United States due to ineffectiveness so far. Resources have been redirected from monitoring EAB and regulating activities regarding them to instead focus on direct management, with a focus on biological controls (see §Biological control below).

Emerald ash borers have eliminated the majority of the 300,000 ash trees in the National Capital Region in nine years, leaving fewer than 80,000. These forests had 17-18 ash trees per hectare prior to infestation, and 5-6 per hectare subsequently, with an impact on ecosystems. Ash-dominated swamplands have become shrublands, impacting wildlife.

=== Environmental and economic impacts ===
Emerald ash borers threaten the entire North American genus Fraxinus. It has killed tens of millions of ash trees so far and threatens to kill most of the 8.7 billion ash trees throughout North America. EABs kill young trees several years before reaching their seeding age of 10 years. In both North America and Europe, the loss of ash from an ecosystem can result in increased numbers of invasive plants, changes in soil nutrients, and effects on species that feed on ash.

Damage and efforts to control the spread of emerald ash borer have affected businesses that sell ash trees or wood products, property owners, and local or state governments. Quarantines can limit the transport of ash trees and products, but economic impacts are especially high for urban and residential areas because of treatment or removal costs and decreased land value from dying trees. Costs for managing these trees can fall upon homeowners or local municipalities. For municipalities, removing large numbers of dead or infested trees at once is costly, so slowing down the rate at which trees die through removing known infested trees and treating trees with insecticides can allow local governments more time to plan, remove, and replace trees that eventually die. This strategy saves money, as it would cost $10.7 billion in urban areas of 25 states over 10 years, while removing and replacing all ash trees in these same areas at once would cost $25 billion (with another estimate putting the removal alone at $20–60 billion). Some urban areas such as Minneapolis have large populations of ash trees with slightly more than 20% of their urban forest as ash.

However, researchers at institutions like Cornell University are also studying "lingering ash"— rare, naturally resistant trees that survive and stay healthy even after 95% of the surrounding ash population has been wiped out. Scientists hope to breed and cultivate these resilient trees to eventually repopulate our forests with beetle-resistant ash.

=== Monitoring ===
In areas where the emerald ash borer has not yet been detected, surveys are used to monitor for new infestations. Visual surveys are used to find ash trees displaying EAB damage, and traps with colors attractive to them, such as purple or green, are hung in trees as part of a monitoring program. These traps can also have volatile pheromones applied to them that attract primarily males.

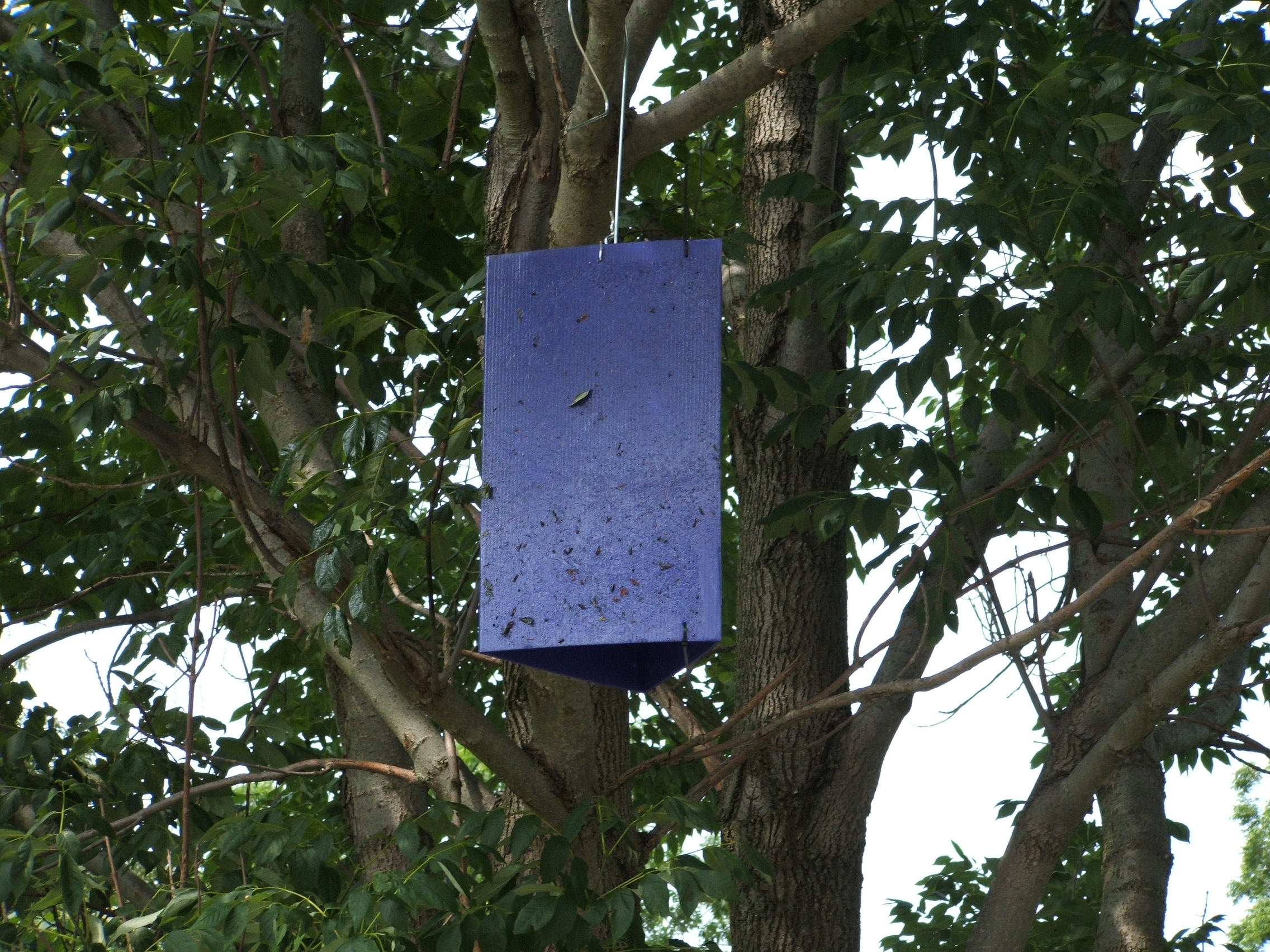
A purple trap used for determining the extent of the invasion

Sometimes, trees are girdled to act as trap trees to monitor for emerald ash borers. The stressed tree attracts egg-laying females in the spring, and trees can be debarked in the fall to search for larvae. If detected, an area is often placed under a quarantine to prevent infested wood material from causing new infestations. Further control measures are then taken within the area to slow population growth by reducing beetle numbers, preventing them from reaching reproductive maturity and dispersing, and reducing the abundance of ash trees.

Government agencies in both the U.S. and Canada have used a native species of parasitoid wasp, Cerceris fumipennis, as a means of detecting areas to which the emerald ash borer has spread. The females of these wasps hunt other jewel beetles and emerald ash borers if present. The wasps stun the beetles and carry them back to their burrows in the ground, where they are stored until the wasps' eggs hatch and the wasp larvae feed on the beetles. Volunteers catch the wasps as they return to their burrows carrying the beetles to determine whether emerald ash borer is present. This methodology is known as biological surveillance, as opposed to biological control, because it does not appear that the wasps have a significant negative impact on emerald ash borer populations.

=== Management ===
In areas where the emerald ash borer is non-native and invasive, quarantines, infested tree removal, insecticides, and biological control are used to reduce damage to ash trees.

==== Quarantine and tree removal ====
Once an infestation is detected, quarantines are typically imposed by state, or previously, national government agencies disallowing transport of ash firewood or live plants outside of these areas without permits indicating the material has been inspected or treated (i.e., heat treatment or wood chipping) to ensure no live emerald ash borer are present in the bark and phloem. In urban areas, trees are often removed once an infestation is found to reduce emerald ash borer population densities and the likelihood of further spread. Urban ash are typically replaced with non-ash species such as maple, oak, or linden to limit food sources. In rural areas, trees can be harvested for lumber or firewood to reduce ash stand density, but quarantines may apply for this material, especially in areas where the material could be infested.

Kentucky Extension specialists suggest selecting uncommon species to replace removed ashes in the landscape. Previous generations created monocultures by planting ash trees in an overabundance, a factor in the extent of the devastation caused by the emerald ash borer. Favoring instead a diversity in species helps keep urban forests healthy. University of Kentucky scientists suggest choosing monotypic species such as the pawpaw, yellowwood, Franklin tree, Kentucky coffeetree, Osage orange, sourwood, and bald cypress.

==== Insecticides ====
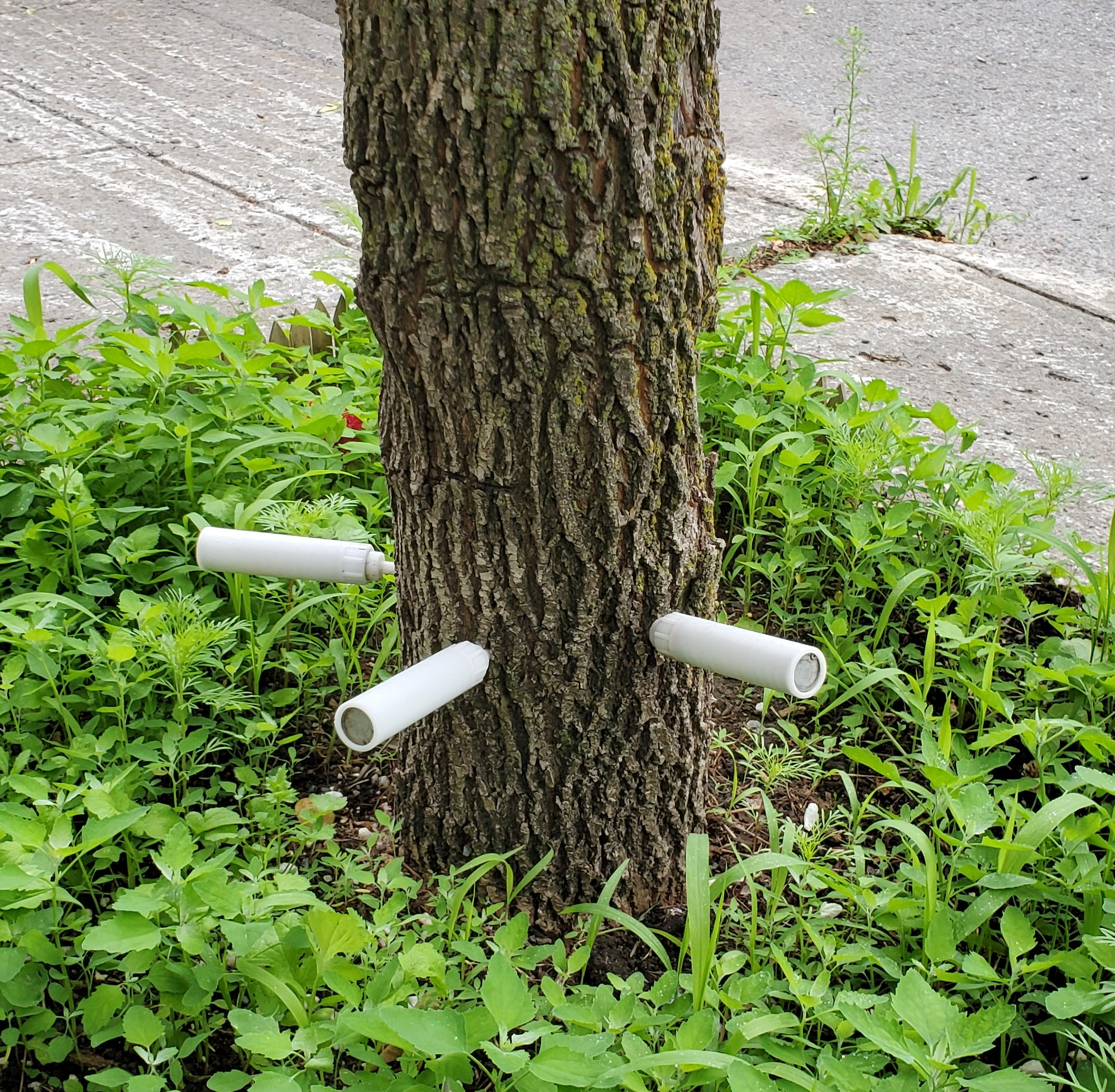
Treatment of an ash tree on a street in Montreal with the biopesticide TreeAzin

Insecticides with active ingredients such as azadirachtin, imidacloprid, emamectin benzoate, and dinotefuran are currently used. Dinotefuran and imidacloprid are systemic (i.e., incorporated into the tree) and remain effective for one to three years depending on the product. Insecticides are typically only considered a viable option in urban areas with high-value trees near an infestation. Ash trees are primarily treated by direct injection into the tree or soil drench. Some insecticides cannot be applied by homeowners and must be applied by licensed applicators. Damage from emerald ash borers can continue to increase over time even with insecticide applications. Insecticide treatments are not feasible for large, forested areas outside of urban areas.

==== Biological control ====
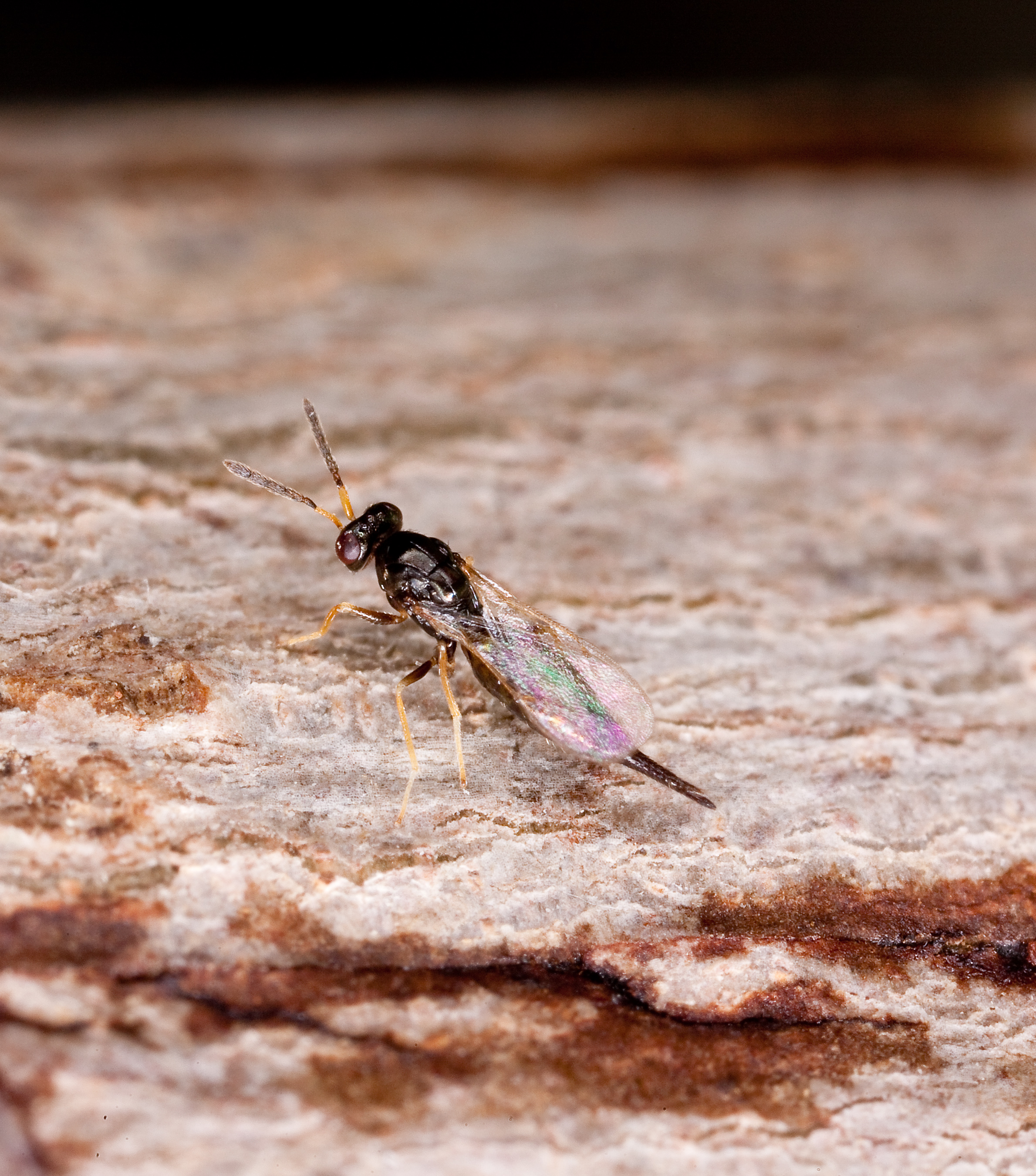
Tetrastichus planipennisi, a parasitoid wasp used as a biological control agent

The native range of the emerald ash borer in Asia was surveyed for species that parasitize emerald ash borers and do not attack other insect species in the hope they would suppress populations when released in North America. Three species imported from China were approved for release by the USDA in 2007 and in Canada in 2013: Spathius agrili, Tetrastichus planipennisi, and Oobius agrili, while Spathius galinae was approved for release in 2015. Excluding Spathius galinae, which has only recently been released, the other three species have been documented parasitizing emerald ash borer larvae one year after release, indicating that they survived the winter, but establishment varied among species and locations. Tetrastichus planipennisi and Oobius agrili established and have had increasing populations in Michigan since 2008; Spathius agrili has had lower establishment success in North America, which could be caused by a lack of available emerald ash borer larvae at the time of adult emergence in spring, limited cold tolerance, and better suitability to regions of North America below the 40th parallel.

As of 2020, Animal and Plant Health Inspection Service (APHIS) and its partners have released more than 8 million parasitoids in 30 states and D.C, with Parasitoid Wasp offspring recovered in 22 states. This showcases successful establishment from current release programs, justifying increased focus from APHIS.

Since 2009, USDA Rearing efforts have produced and released more than 9 million parasitoids in 34 states (Arkansas, Colorado, Connecticut, Delaware, Georgia, Illinois, Indiana, Iowa, Kansas, Kentucky, Louisiana, Maine, Maryland, Massachusetts, Michigan, Minnesota, Missouri, Nebraska, New Hampshire, New Jersey, New York, North Carolina, Ohio, Oklahoma, Oregon, Pennsylvania, Rhode Island, South Carolina, South Dakota, Tennessee, Vermont, Virginia, West Virginia, and Wisconsin), the District of Columbia, and five Canadian Provinces (Manitoba, New Brunswick, Nova Scotia, Ontario, and Québec). Release applications are accepted and reviewed by Animal and Plant Health Inspection Service (APHIS).

One of the main measurements used by APHIS in release applications is Growing degree-day (GDD). Releases for T. planipennisi, S. galinae, & O. agrili are recommended to either stop or face additional scrutiny at >3,500 GDD, 2,500 GDD, & ~ 2,500 GDD respectively. S. agrili releases are restricted to areas that accumulate >3,500 GDD50F and focused in southern states.

The USDA is also assessing the application of Beauveria bassiana, an insect fungal pathogen, for controlling emerald ash borers in conjunction with parasitoid wasps.

== See also ==
- Lamprodila festiva
- Forest integrated pest management
- Forest pathology
- Chestnut blight
- Dutch elm disease
- Invasive species
