= Rhopalovalva orbiculata =

Scientific classification
- Domain: Eukaryota
- Kingdom: Animalia
- Phylum: Arthropoda
- Class: Insecta
- Order: Lepidoptera
- Family: Tortricidae
- Genus: Rhopalovalva
- Species: R. orbiculata

Binomial name
- Rhopalovalva orbiculata Zhang & Li, 2004

Species of moth

Rhopalovalva orbiculata is a species of moth of the family Tortricidae. It is found in China (Fujian, Henan, Hunan, Guangxi, Guizhou).

The wingspan is 10–12 mm.
