= Gracillaria japonica =

Scientific classification
- Kingdom: Animalia
- Phylum: Arthropoda
- Class: Insecta
- Order: Lepidoptera
- Family: Gracillariidae
- Genus: Gracillaria
- Species: G. japonica

Binomial name
- Gracillaria japonica Kumata, 1982

Species of moth

Gracillaria japonica is a moth of the family Gracillariidae. It is known from the island of Honshu, the main island of Japan.

The wingspan is 9.8–13 mm.

The larvae feed on Ligustrum obtusifolium and Ligustrum tschonoskii. They mine the leaves of their host plant.
