= Gracillaria chalcanthes =

Scientific classification
- Kingdom: Animalia
- Phylum: Arthropoda
- Class: Insecta
- Order: Lepidoptera
- Family: Gracillariidae
- Genus: Gracillaria
- Species: G. chalcanthes

Binomial name
- Gracillaria chalcanthes (Meyrick, 1894)

Species of moth

Gracillaria chalcanthes is a moth of the family Gracillariidae. It is known from Myanmar.
