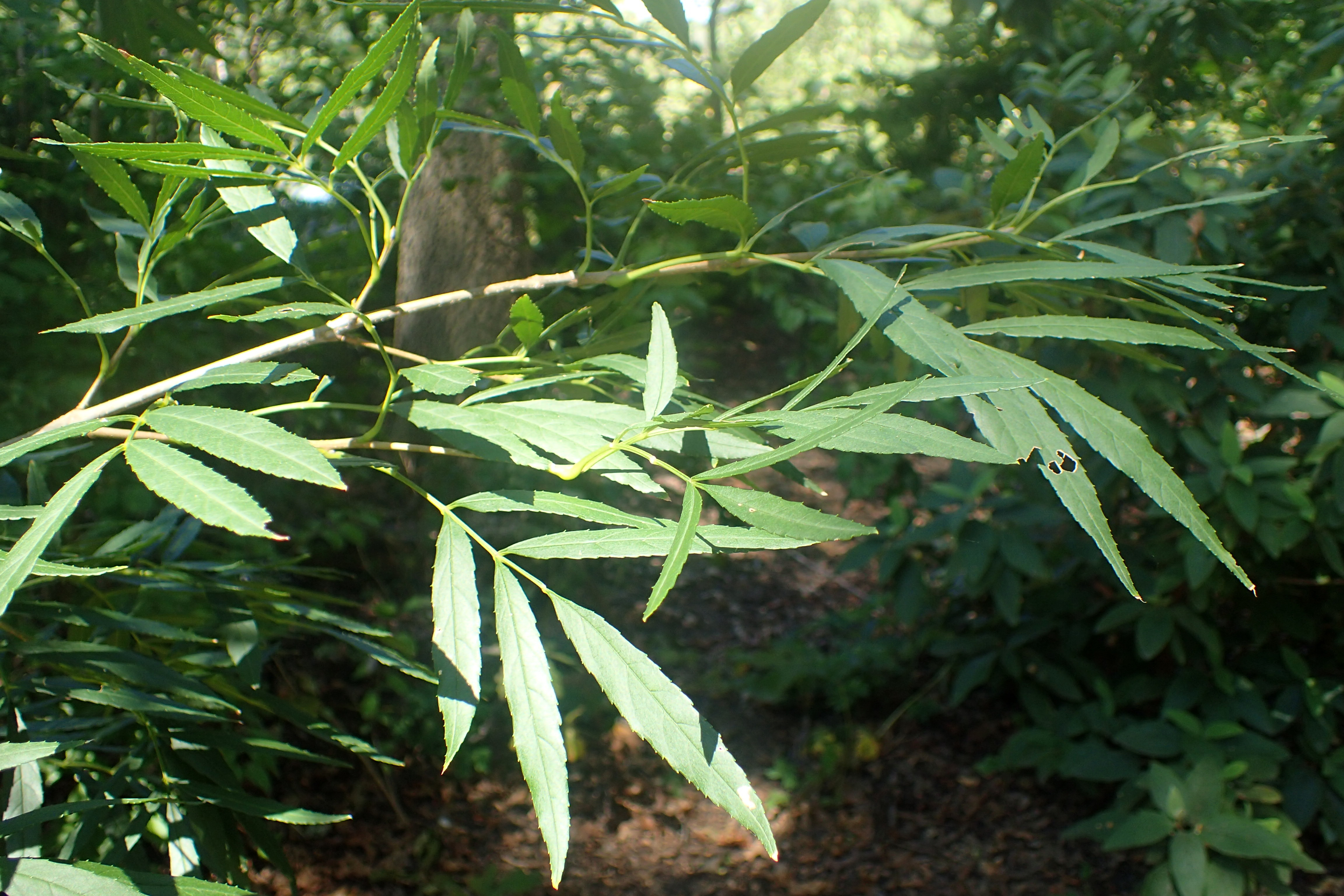

Conservation status
- Vulnerable (IUCN 3.1)

Scientific classification
- Kingdom: Plantae
- Clade: Tracheophytes
- Clade: Angiosperms
- Clade: Eudicots
- Clade: Asterids
- Order: Lamiales
- Family: Oleaceae
- Genus: Fraxinus
- Section: Fraxinus sect. Ornus
- Species: F. baroniana

Binomial name
- Fraxinus baroniana Diels

= Fraxinus baroniana =

Species of flowering plant

Fraxinus baroniana is a species of ash tree native to China, where it is found in Gansu, Shaanxi and Sichuan provinces.
