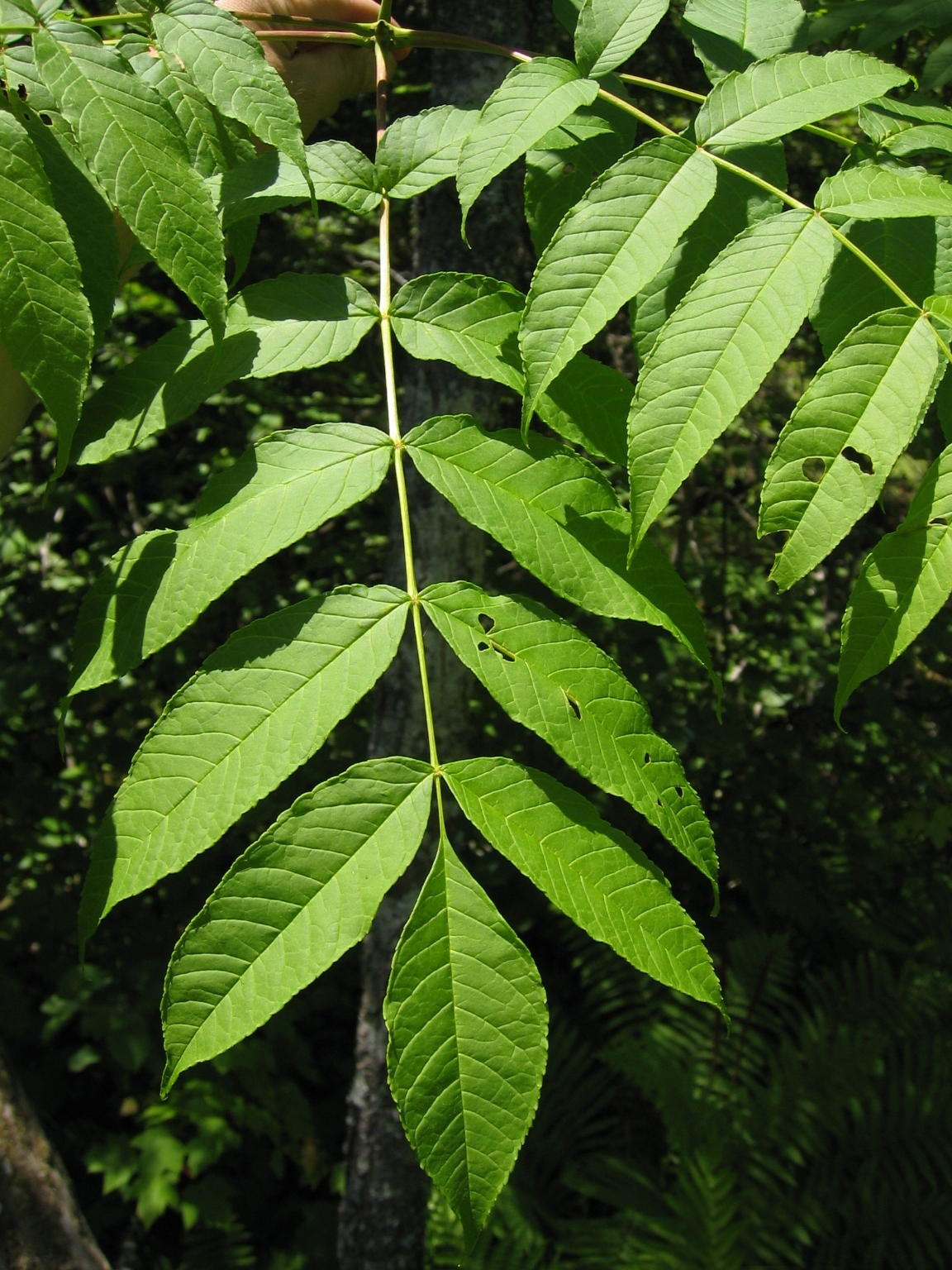

Conservation status
- Critically Endangered (IUCN 3.1)

- Secure (NatureServe)

Scientific classification
- Kingdom: Plantae
- Clade: Tracheophytes
- Clade: Angiosperms
- Clade: Eudicots
- Clade: Asterids
- Order: Lamiales
- Family: Oleaceae
- Genus: Fraxinus
- Section: Fraxinus sect. Fraxinus
- Species: F. nigra

Binomial name
- Fraxinus nigra Marshall
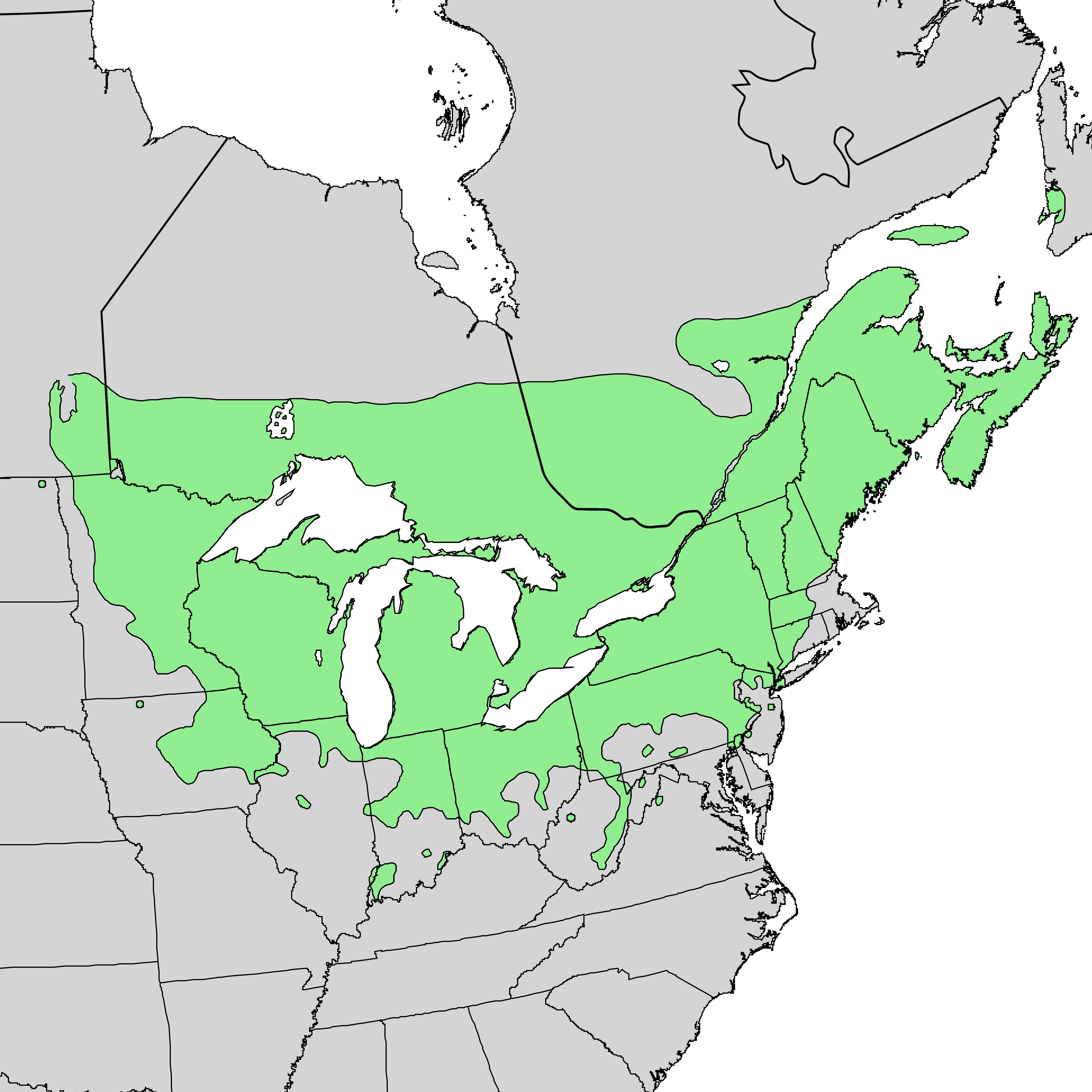
- Natural range

= Fraxinus nigra =

Species of ash

Fraxinus nigra, or the black ash, is a species of ash native to much of eastern Canada and the northeastern United States, from western Newfoundland west to southeastern Manitoba, and south to Illinois and northern Virginia. Formerly abundant, as of 2017 the species is threatened with near total extirpation throughout its range within the next century as a result of infestation by an invasive parasitic insect known as the emerald ash borer (Agrilus planipennis).

== Description ==
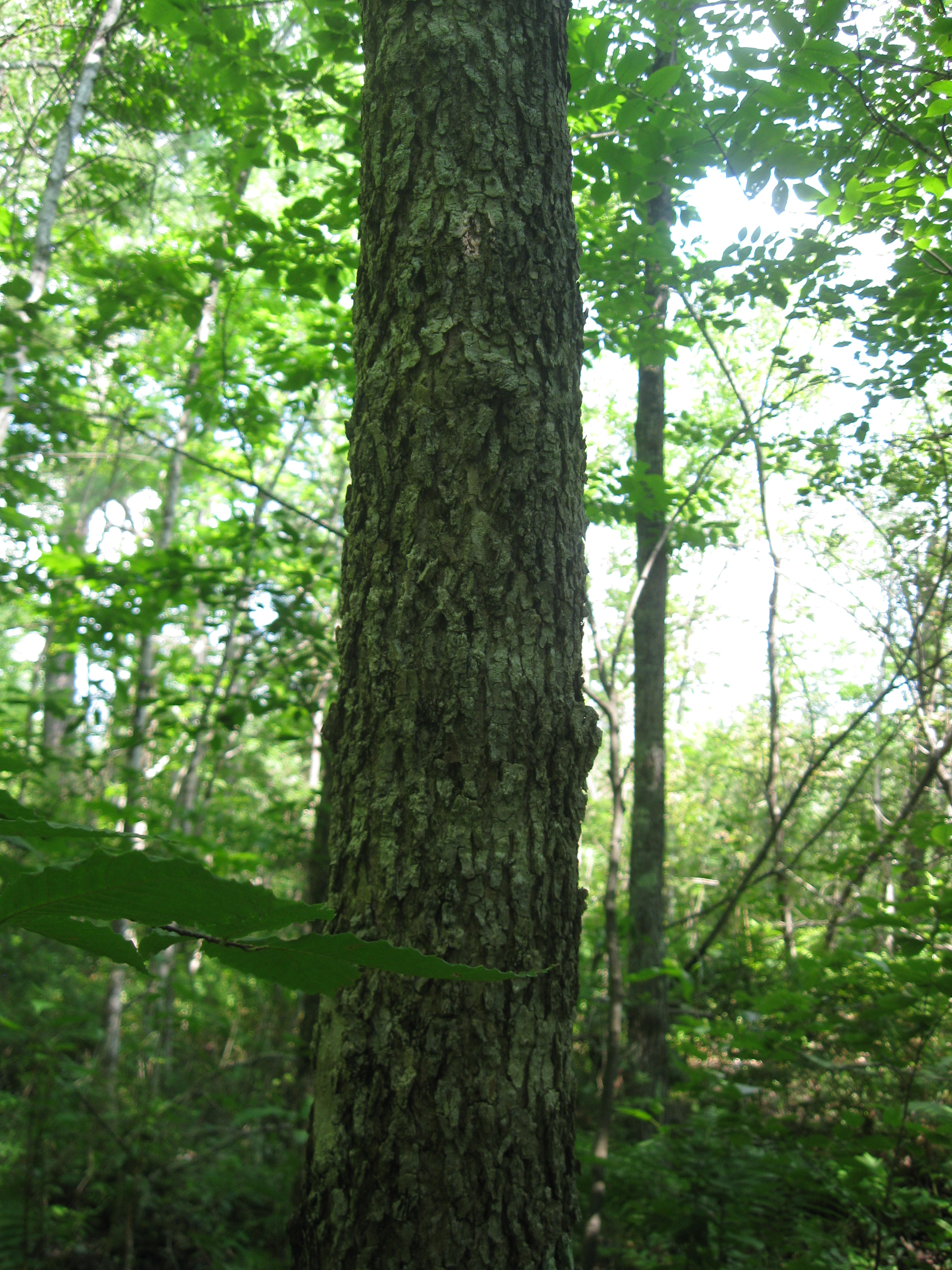
Image of black ash trunk. Tree is located in a seasonally wet riparian habitat near a small stream. Tree bark is corky and spongy.

Black ash is a medium-sized deciduous tree reaching 15–20 metres (49–66 ft) (exceptionally 26 metres (85 ft)) tall with a trunk up to 60 cm (24 inches) diameter, or exceptionally to 160 cm (63 inches). The bark is grey, thick and corky even on young trees, becoming scaly and fissured with age. The winter buds are dark brown to blackish, with a velvety texture. The leaves are opposite, pinnately compound, with 7–13 (most often 9) leaflets; each leaf is 20–45 cm (8–18 in) long, the leaflets 7–16 cm (2 3/4–6 1/4 in) long and 2.5–5 cm (1–2 in) broad, with a finely toothed margin. The leaflets are sessile, directly attached to the rachis without a petiolule. The flowers are produced in spring shortly before the new leaves, in loose panicles; they are inconspicuous with no petals, and are wind-pollinated. The fruit is a samara 2.5–4.5 cm (1–1 3/4 in) long comprising a single seed 2 cm (3/4 in) long with an elongated apical wing 1.5–2 cm (5/8–3/4 in) long and 6–8 mm (1/4–5/16 in) broad.

== Ecology and conservation status ==
Black ash commonly occurs in swamps, often with the closely related green ash. Its fall foliage is yellow. Black ash is one of the first trees to lose its leaves in the fall. It is very closely related to Manchurian ash, and will easily hybridize with it. Some consider the two to be geographic isolates of each other.

The species was considered abundant and its survival of little concern prior to the invasion of the emerald ash borer, first detected in North America in 2002. However, since that time this invasive insect has spread throughout most of the tree's range, and within a few years black ash is expected to be all but extirpated; a similar fate awaits green ash. In 2014, a U.S. Forest Service agent estimated that "ninety-nine percent of the ashes in North America are probably going to die." Blue ash and white ash are only slightly less affected. Some populations in the northern part of its range may persist, where they see winter temperatures low enough to kill or significantly reduce the population of the emerald ash borer.

Due to the ongoing decline of black ash in eastern Canada due to emerald ash borer, among other threats, the species was assessed by COSEWIC as threatened in 2018. Likewise, black ash was previously listed as threatened under the Nova Scotia Endangered Species Act in 2013.

== Direct usefulness for humans ==
In Mi'kma'ki (made up of Nova Scotia, New Brunswick, Prince Edward Island, and eastern Quebec, Canada), the black ash, or wisqoq, has been vital to the Mi'kmaq culture and was used to make many functional items like chairs, canoes, axes, snowshoes, and most notably, baskets. The sale of black ash baskets sustained many Mi'kmaw families when income was scarce.

The Shakers also made extensive use of the black ash for creating baskets. Also called basket ash, brown ash, swamp ash, hoop ash, and water ash, it is a popular wood for making electric guitars and basses, due to its good resonant qualities.

=== Creating basket strips ===
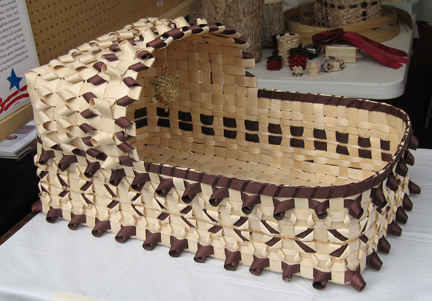
Black ash splint basket by Kelly Church (Odawa-Ojibwe)

Black ash is unique among all trees in North America in that it does not have fibers connecting the growth rings to each other. This is a useful property for basket makers. By pounding on the wood with a mallet, the weaker spring wood layer is crushed, allowing the tougher and darker summer wood layer to be peeled off in long strips. The long strips are trimmed, cleaned, and used in basket weaving. Indigenous peoples of the Northeastern Woodlands also make bark baskets from black ash, traditionally used for berry-gathering.

== Importance to wildlife ==
North American native ash tree species are used by North American frogs as a critical food source, as the leaves that fall from the trees are particularly suitable for tadpoles to feed upon in ponds (both temporary and permanent), large puddles, and other water sources. Species such as red maple, which are taking the place of ash, due to the ash borer, are much less suitable for the frogs as a food source—resulting in poor frog survival rates and small frog sizes. It is the lack of tannins in the American ash variety that makes them good for the frogs as a food source and also not resistant to the ash borer. Varieties of ash from outside North America typically have much higher tannin levels and resist the borer. Maples and various non-native invasive trees, trees that are taking the place of American ash species in the North American ecosystem, typically have much higher leaf tannin levels. Ash species native to North America also provide important habitat and food for various other creatures that are native to North America, such as the long-horned beetle, avian species, and mammalian species. Black ash is a food plant for the larvae of several species of Lepidoptera; see List of Lepidoptera that feed on ashes.
