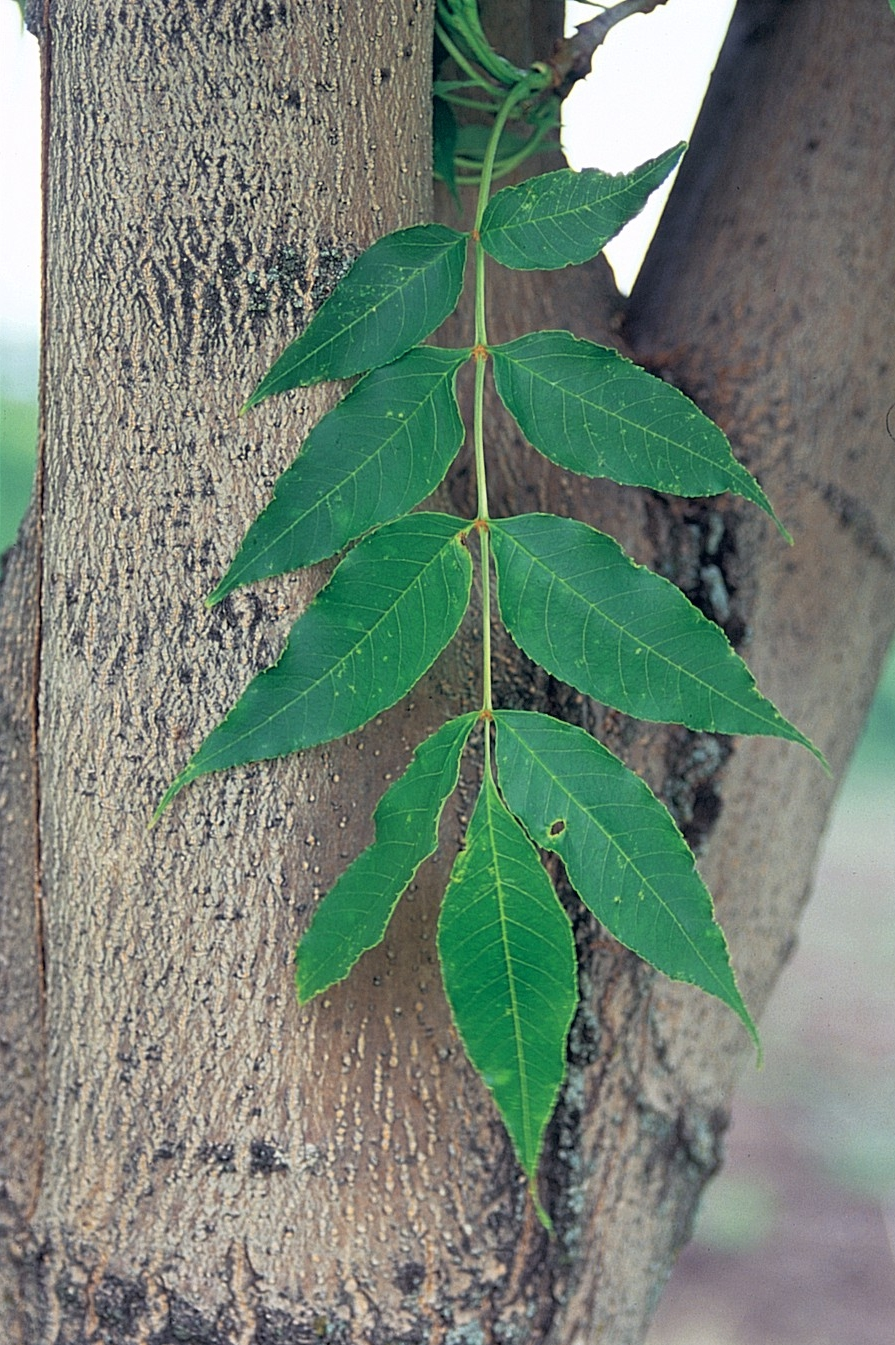
- Manchurian Ash leaf and bark

Conservation status
- Least Concern (IUCN 3.1)
- CITES Appendix III (CITES)

Scientific classification
- Kingdom: Plantae
- Clade: Tracheophytes
- Clade: Angiosperms
- Clade: Eudicots
- Clade: Asterids
- Order: Lamiales
- Family: Oleaceae
- Genus: Fraxinus
- Section: Fraxinus sect. Fraxinus
- Species: F. mandshurica

Binomial name
- Fraxinus mandshurica Rupr.

= Fraxinus mandschurica =

Manchurian ash

Species of ash

Fraxinus mandshurica, or the Manchurian ash, is a species of Fraxinus native to northeastern Asia in northern China (Gansu, Hebei, Heilongjiang, Henan, Hubei, Jilin, Liaoning, Shaanxi, Shanxi), Korea, Japan and southeastern Russia (Sakhalin Island).

It is a medium-sized to large deciduous tree reaching 30 m tall, with a trunk up to 50 cm in diameter. The leaves are 25–40 cm long, pinnate compound, with 7–13 leaflets, the leaflets 5–20 cm long and 2–5 cm broad, subsessile on the leaf rachis, and with a serrated margin. They turn to a golden-yellow in early autumn, and the tree is usually early to change color. The flowers are produced in early spring, before the new leaves, in compact panicles; they are inconspicuous with no petals, and are wind-pollinated. The fruit is a samara comprising a single seed 1–2 cm long with an elongated apical wing 2.5–4 cm long and 5–7 mm broad.

It is closely related to Fraxinus nigra (black ash) from eastern North America, and has been treated as a subspecies or variety of it by some authors, as F. nigra subsp. mandschurica (Rupr.) S.S.Sun, or F. nigra var. mandschurica (Rupr.) Lingelsheim. However, unlike that species, Fraxinus mandshurica is dioecious, with male and female flowers produced on separate individuals.

The spelling of the species name is disputed; some (e.g. the Flora of China) cite mandschurica, while others (e.g. USDA GRIN) cite mandshurica. The original 1857 Russian publication spelled it without the "c".

== Ecology ==
It is tolerant of many soil conditions including the wet soils of swamps and river valleys, and is not particular as to soil pH except for showing poor growth at high pH. It requires full sun for optimal growth, and should receive at least 50 cm of precipitation each year. It requires a continental climate with well-defined seasons with cold winters, hot summers, and freedom from late spring frosts.

The seeds are eaten by a wide variety of birds.

== Uses ==
This tree is occasionally cultivated as an ornamental tree in parts of Canada and the United States. Manchurian ash can be used as a medium height wind break for a farmstead. It is also highly tolerant of urban pollution and will even grow well in inner city environments. The tree also makes an excellent landscape tree in moist areas, especially along roads and ditches where a good amount of water can be available. The Manchurian grows into a denser oval form with age.

It has proved very intolerant of oceanic climate conditions in cultivation, leafing out too early and then being damaged by late spring frosts.

The species is being tested as a potential source of genes for resistance to emerald ash borer Agrilus planipennis, an Asian insect which occurs alongside Manchurian ash in the wild, and which has become an invasive pest species in North America. However, significant mortality in Manchurian ash from emerald ash borer is also recorded in the wild in China.

The cultivar Fraxinus mandshurica 'Mancana' ("Manchana Ash") has been selected by the Morden Research Station, Morden, Manitoba. It has a dense oval to globose crown, and is a male tree; it is very hardy. Hybrids with black ash have also been produced in cultivation.
