= F. floribunda =

F. floribunda may refer to:

- Fagraea floribunda, a plant with flowers that open in the evening
- Fraxinus floribunda, an ash native to the Himalayas
