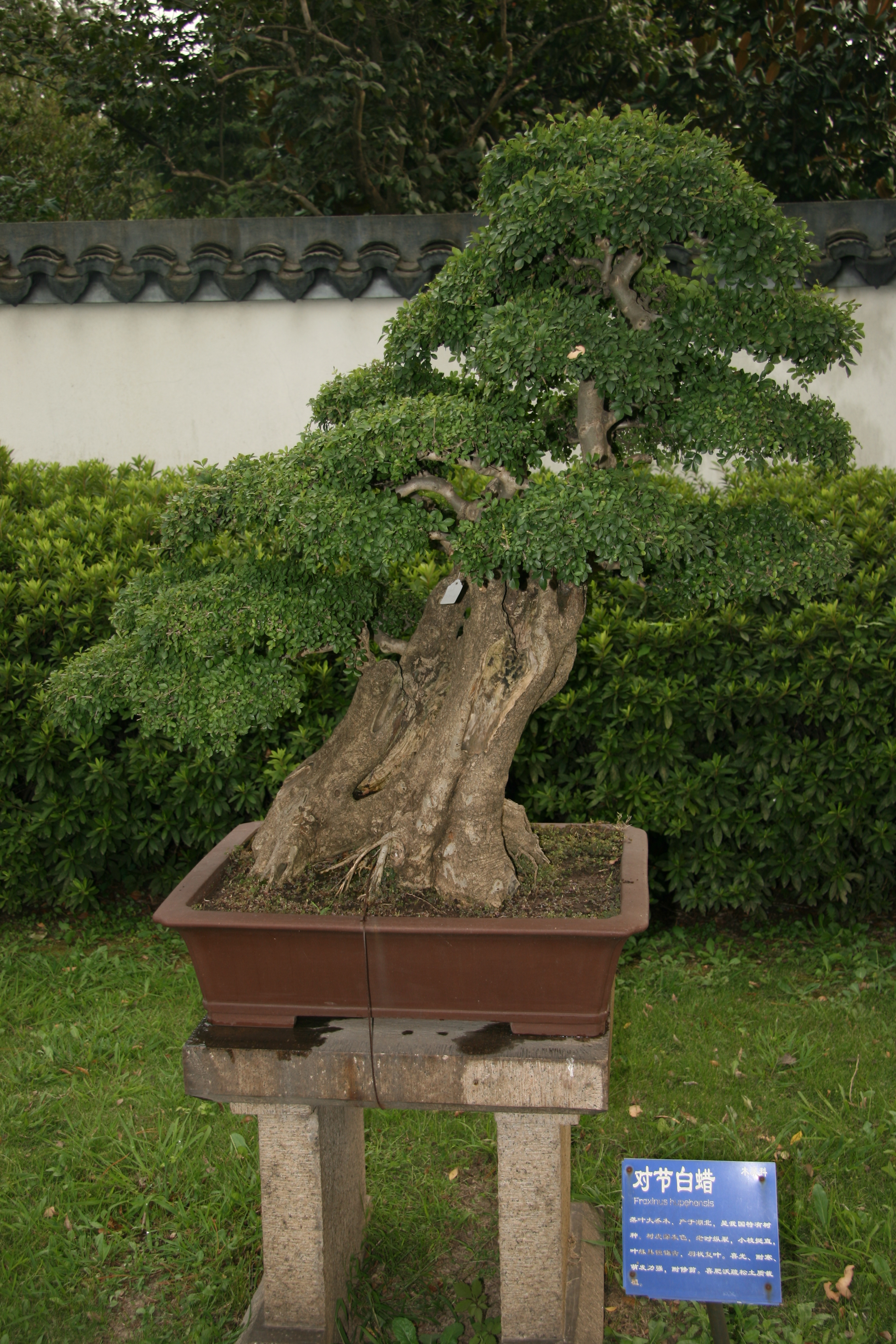
- hu bei qin used for penjing

Conservation status
- Endangered (IUCN 3.1)

Scientific classification
- Kingdom: Plantae
- Clade: Tracheophytes
- Clade: Angiosperms
- Clade: Eudicots
- Clade: Asterids
- Order: Lamiales
- Family: Oleaceae
- Genus: Fraxinus
- Section: Fraxinus sect. Sciadanthus
- Species: F. hubeiensis

Binomial name
- Fraxinus hubeiensis S.Z.Qu, C.B.Shang & P.L.Su 1979

Synonyms
- Fraxinus hupehensis S.Z.Qu, C.B.Shang & P.L.Su, 1980 orthographic variant

= Fraxinus hubeiensis =

Species of ash

Fraxinus hubeiensis is a species of ash native to Hubei province in China.

The species was first described in an obscure paper in 1979 with the name Fraxinus hubeiensis. The description was republished the following year later in a more widely distributed journal, spelled Fraxinus hupehensis. The latter is now considered a spelling variant, with Fraxinus hubeiensis the correct spelling.

A molecular study shows it is most closely related to the Afghan ash (Fraxinus xanthoxyloides) which is found from North Africa to western China. The two are the only members of the section Sciadanthus.

Fraxinus hubeiensis grows as a tree to 19 m (60 ft) high. It has compound leaves which are range from 7 to 15 cm (2.5–6 in) in length and are composed of 7 to 9 (or rarely 11) leaflets.

It is used in penjing (a Chinese practice similar to the Japanese bonsai), but is at risk of overexploitation.
