= Fraxinus longicuspis =

Conservation status
- Least Concern (IUCN 3.1)

Scientific classification
- Kingdom: Plantae
- Clade: Embryophytes
- Clade: Tracheophytes
- Clade: Spermatophytes
- Clade: Angiosperms
- Clade: Eudicots
- Clade: Asterids
- Order: Lamiales
- Family: Oleaceae
- Genus: Fraxinus
- Species: F. longicuspis

Binomial name
- Fraxinus longicuspis Siebold & Zucc.

Synonyms
- List: Fraxinus borealis Nakai; Fraxinus borealis var. pilosella Honda; Fraxinus bungeana var. obovata (Blume) Lingelsh.; Fraxinus bungeana var. pubinervis (Blume) Wenz.; Fraxinus caudata J.L.Wu; Fraxinus chinensis var. acuminata Lingelsh.; Fraxinus japonica Wesm.; Fraxinus japonica var. pubinervis (Blume) Wesm.; Fraxinus kantoensis Koidz.; Fraxinus koehneana Lingelsh.; Fraxinus longicuspis var. latifolia Nakai; Fraxinus longicuspis var. pilosella (Honda) H.Hara; Fraxinus obovata Blume; Fraxinus pubinervis Mayr; Fraxinus pubinervis Blume; Fraxinus pubinervis var. hamatoserrata Blume; Fraxinus satsumana Koidz.; Fraxinus yamatense Nakai

Species of flowering plant

Fraxinus longicuspis (syn. Fraxinus pubinervis), the taper-tip ash or Japanese ash (a name it shares with other members of its genus), is a species of flowering plant in the family Oleaceae, native to the mountains of central and southern Japan. A deciduous tree, it is hardy to USDA zone 5. It is used as a street tree in a few cities around the world.
