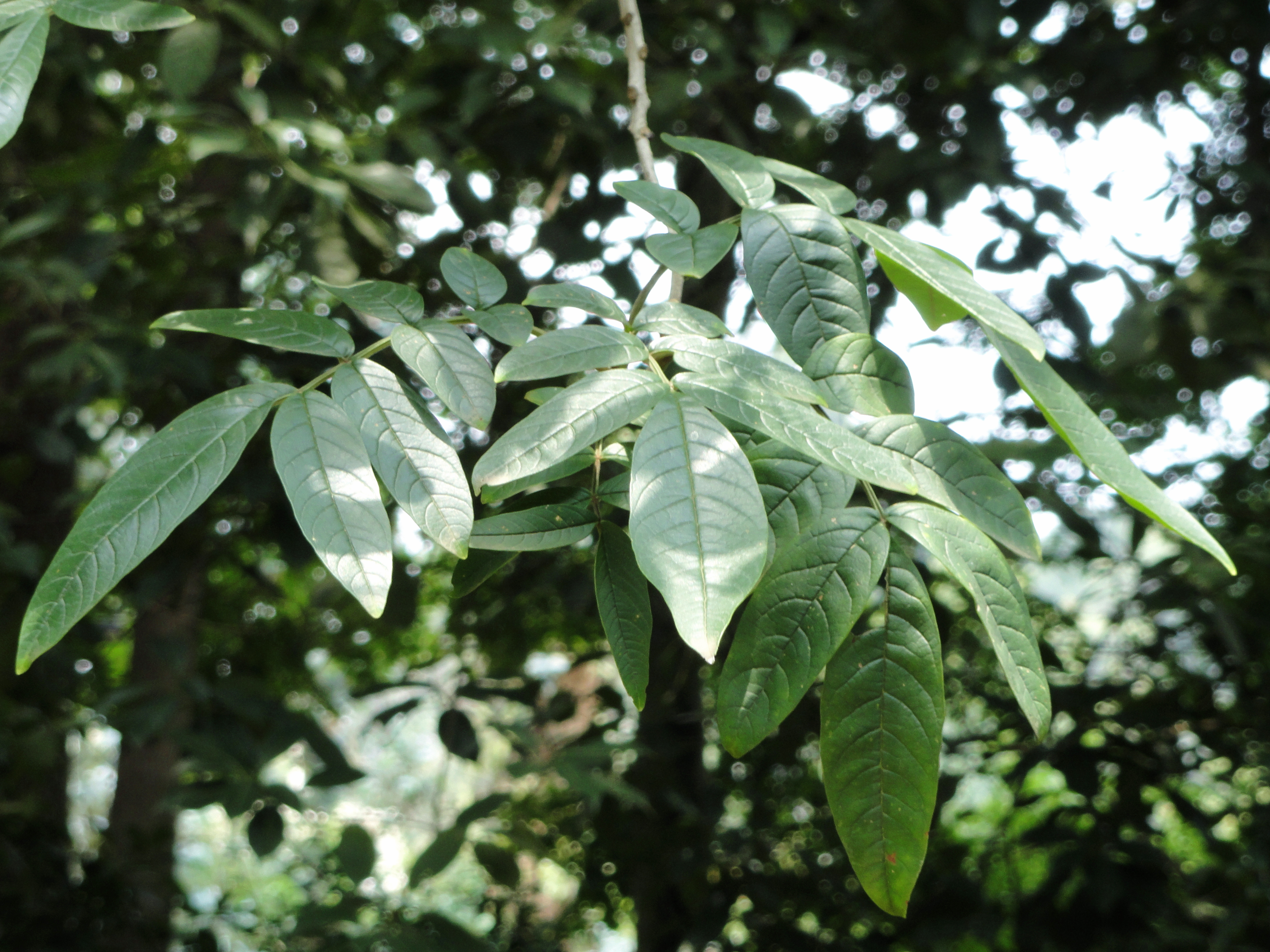

Conservation status
- Least Concern (IUCN 3.1)

Scientific classification
- Kingdom: Plantae
- Clade: Tracheophytes
- Clade: Angiosperms
- Clade: Eudicots
- Clade: Asterids
- Order: Lamiales
- Family: Oleaceae
- Genus: Fraxinus
- Section: Fraxinus sect. Ornus
- Species: F. malacophylla

Binomial name
- Fraxinus malacophylla Hemsl.

Synonyms
- Fraxinus malacophylla f. retusifoliolata (K.M.Feng ex P.Y.Pai) X.K.Qin; Fraxinus retusifoliolata K.M.Feng ex P.Y.Pai

= Fraxinus malacophylla =

Species of flowering plant

Fraxinus malacophylla is a species of ash tree in the family Oleaceae. It is native to China, where it is found in Guangxi and Yunnan provinces, and Thailand.
