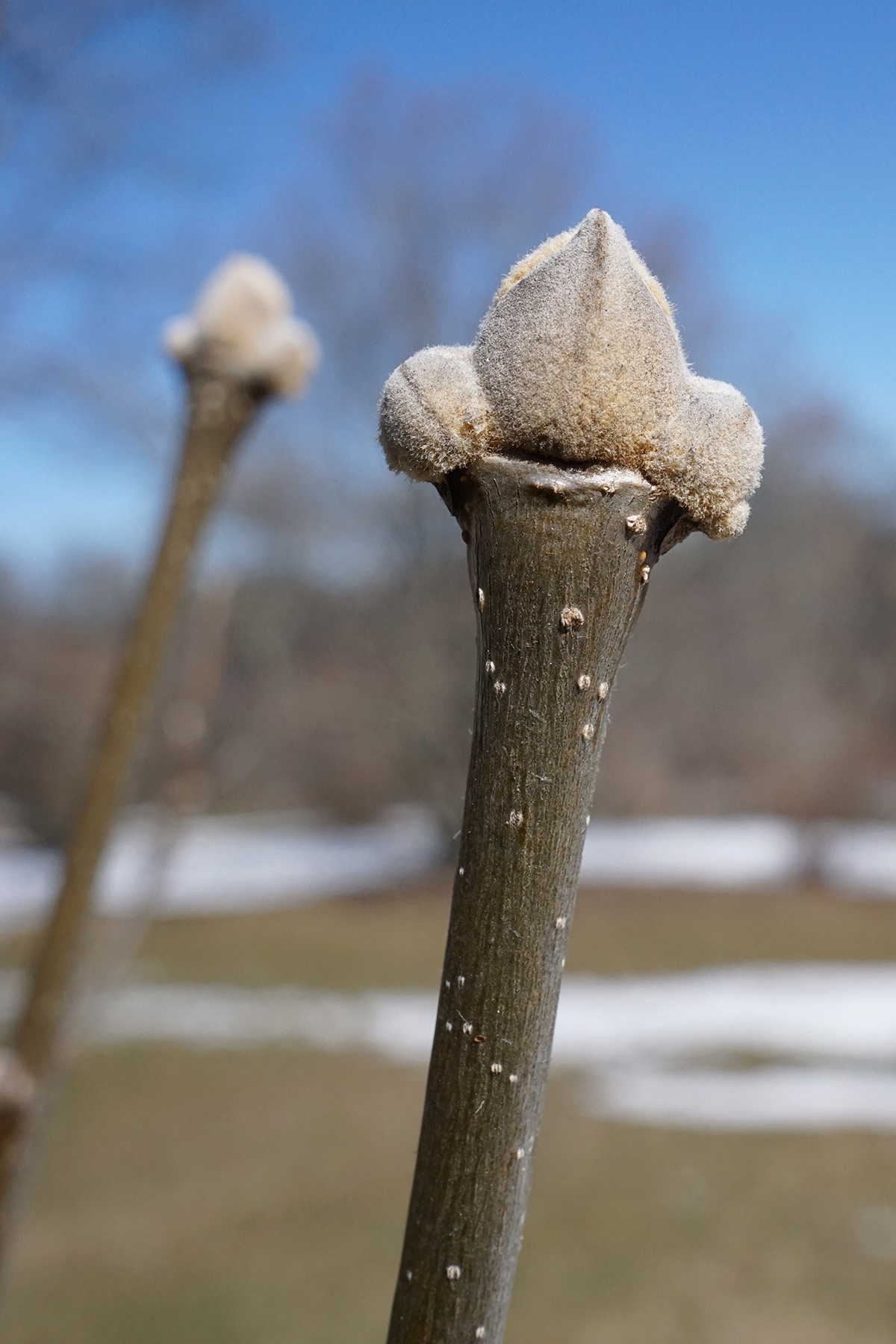
- Buds

Scientific classification
- Kingdom: Plantae
- Clade: Embryophytes
- Clade: Tracheophytes
- Clade: Spermatophytes
- Clade: Angiosperms
- Clade: Eudicots
- Clade: Asterids
- Order: Lamiales
- Family: Oleaceae
- Genus: Fraxinus
- Species: F. paxiana

Binomial name
- Fraxinus paxiana Lingelsh.

Synonyms
- Fraxinus densiflora Lingelsh.

= Fraxinus paxiana =

Species of flowering plant

Fraxinus paxiana is a species of flowering plant in the family Oleaceae, native to central and southern China. A tree reaching 20 m (66 ft), it is found in forested valley slopes, usually from 400 to 1,100 m (1,300 to 3,600 ft) above sea level. In the wild it is heavily infected with Hymenoscyphus fraxineus, the fungal pathogen that causes ash dieback, but shows little damage.
