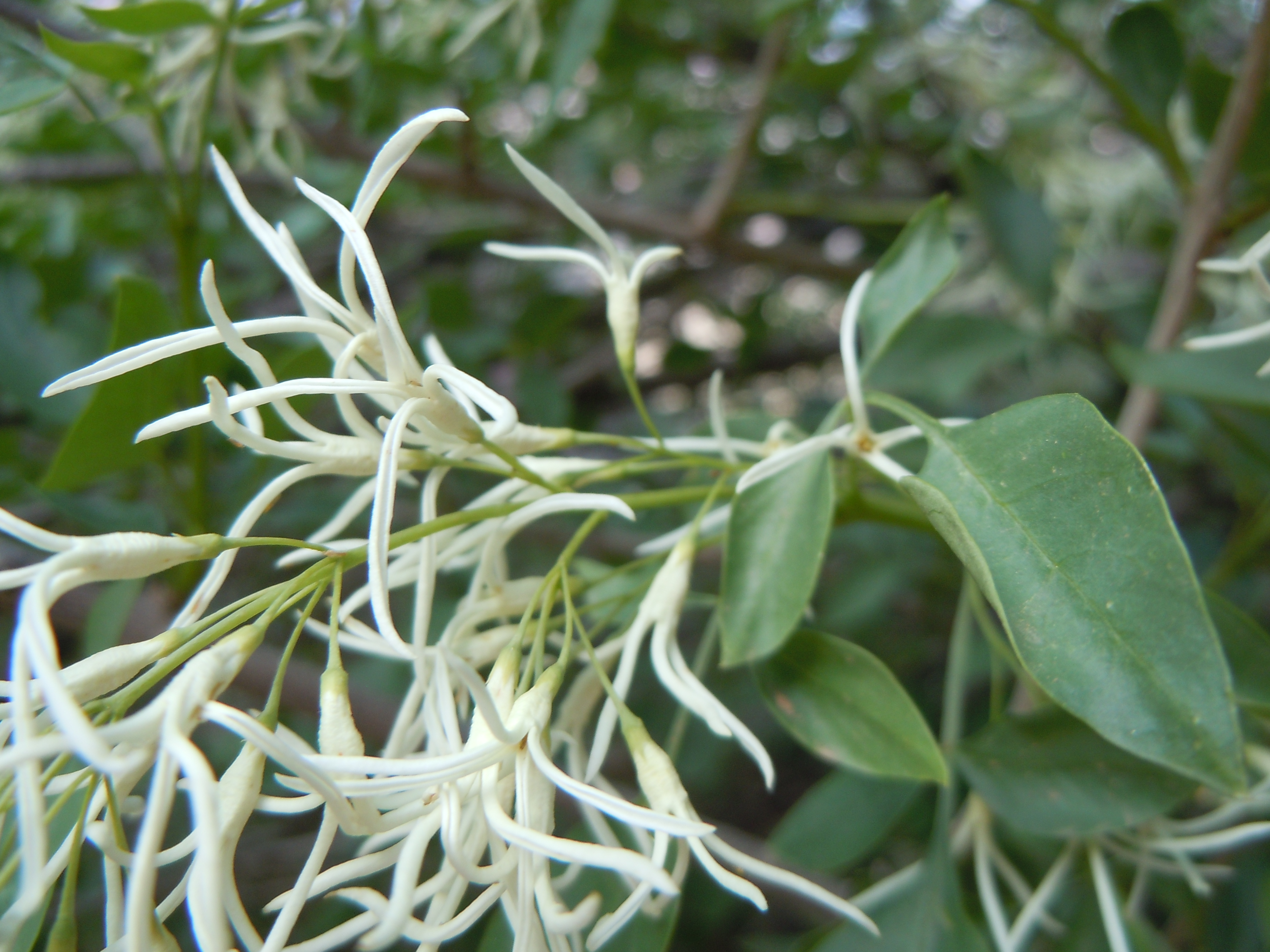

Conservation status
- Least Concern (IUCN 3.1)

- Apparently Secure (NatureServe)

Scientific classification
- Kingdom: Plantae
- Clade: Tracheophytes
- Clade: Angiosperms
- Clade: Eudicots
- Clade: Asterids
- Order: Lamiales
- Family: Oleaceae
- Genus: Fraxinus
- Species: F. cuspidata

Binomial name
- Fraxinus cuspidata Torr.

= Fraxinus cuspidata =

Species of ash

Fraxinus cuspidata, the fragrant ash, is a tree native to northern Mexico and the southwestern United States. It has been reported from Nuevo León, Coahuila, Chihuahua, Tamaulipas, Texas, New Mexico, Arizona and Nevada.
