= Fraxinus greggii =

Conservation status
- Least Concern (IUCN 3.1)

Scientific classification
- Kingdom: Plantae
- Clade: Embryophytes
- Clade: Tracheophytes
- Clade: Spermatophytes
- Clade: Angiosperms
- Clade: Eudicots
- Clade: Asterids
- Order: Lamiales
- Family: Oleaceae
- Genus: Fraxinus
- Species: F. greggii

Binomial name
- Fraxinus greggii A.Gray

Synonyms
- Fraxinus greggii subsp. nummularis (M.E.Jones) A.E.Murray; Fraxinus greggii f. nummularis (M.E.Jones) C.H.Mull.; Fraxinus nummularis M.E.Jones; Fraxinus schiedeana var. parvifolia Torr.; Ornus greggii (A.Gray) Nieuwl

Species of flowering plant

Fraxinus greggii, the littleleaf ash or Gregg's ash, is a species of flowering plant in the family Oleaceae, native to Texas and Mexico. A xerophytic shrub or scrubby tree reaching 6 m (20 ft), it is suitable for screens and containers. There is a cultivar, 'Libby Davison'.

== Subtaxa ==
The following varieties are accepted:

- Fraxinus greggii var. greggii – Texas, northeastern Mexico
- Fraxinus greggii var. nummularis (M.E.Jones) Little – Texas, northwestern, northeastern, and southwestern Mexico, and Veracruz
