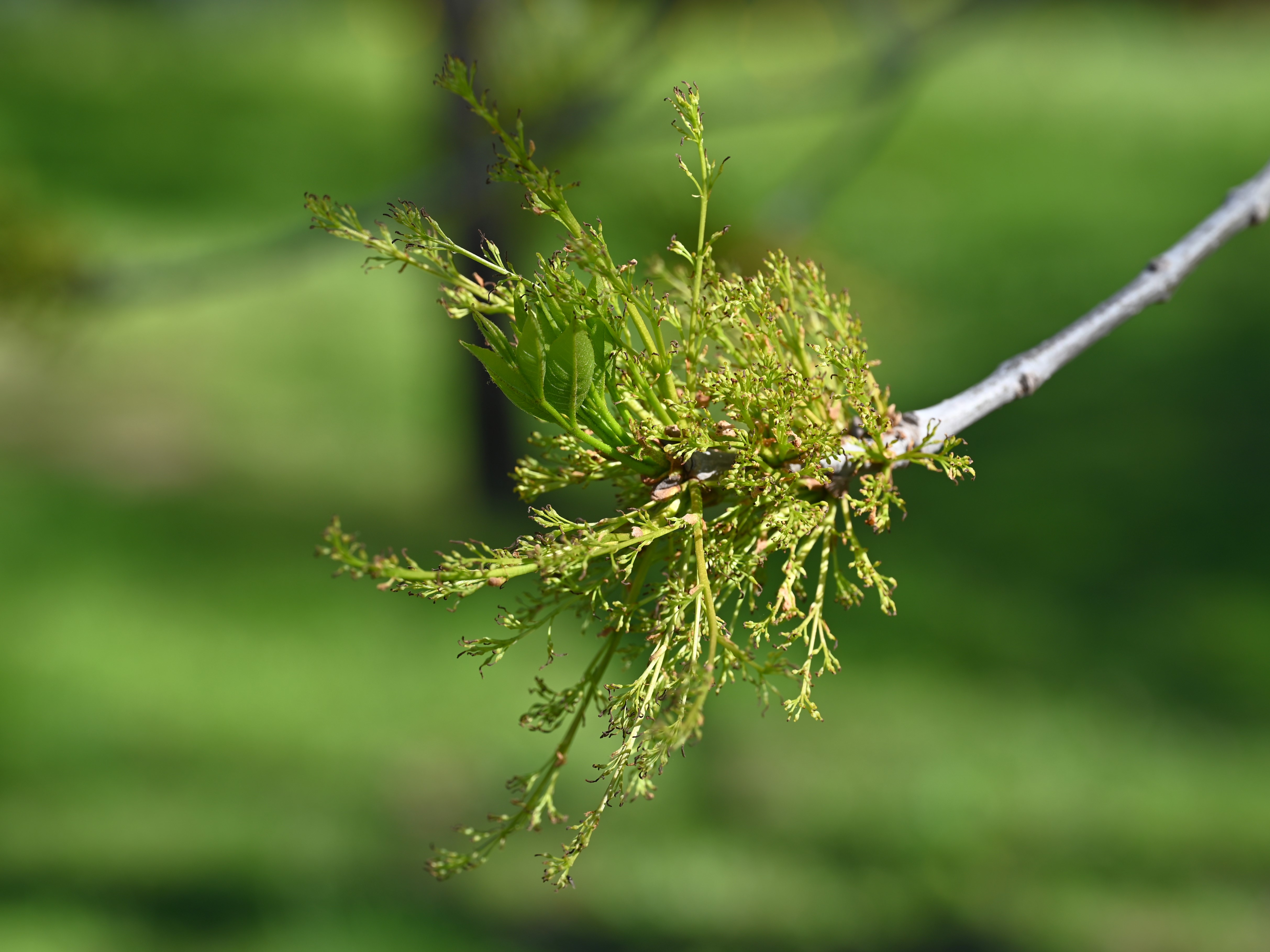
- Fraxinus berlandieriana

Scientific classification
- Kingdom: Plantae
- Clade: Tracheophytes
- Clade: Angiosperms
- Clade: Eudicots
- Clade: Asterids
- Order: Lamiales
- Family: Oleaceae
- Genus: Fraxinus
- Section: Fraxinus sect. Melioides
- Species: F. berlandieriana

Binomial name
- Fraxinus berlandieriana DC.

= Fraxinus berlandieriana =

Mexican ash

Species of ash

Fraxinus berlandieriana, the Mexican ash, is a tree native to eastern and northeastern Mexico and to the south-central United States. It has been reported from Tamaulipas, Veracruz, Texas, New Mexico, Oklahoma, Louisiana, and Mississippi.

Like other species in the section Melioides, Fraxinus berlandieriana is dioecious, with male and female flowers produced on separate individuals.
