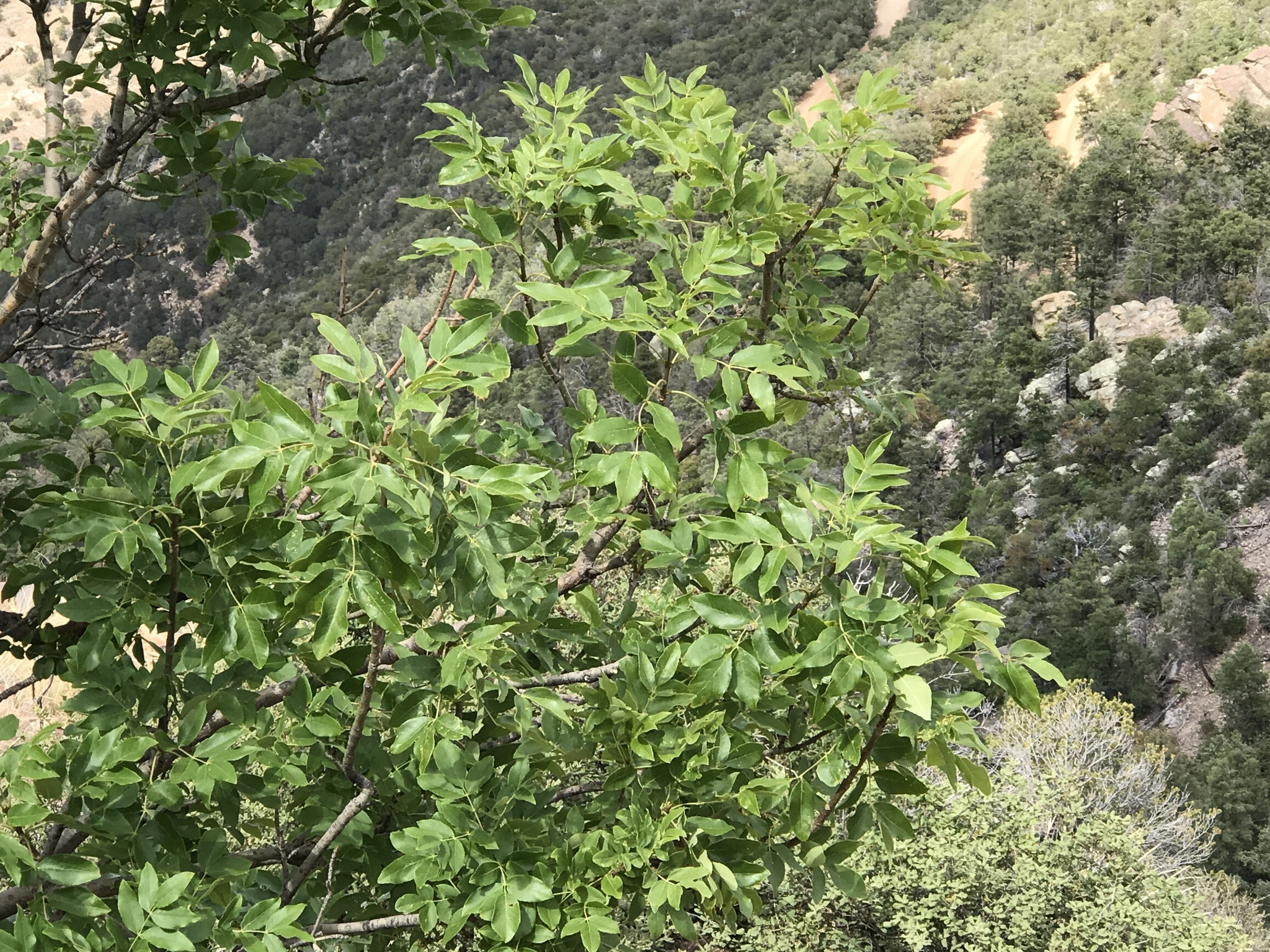

Scientific classification
- Kingdom: Plantae
- Clade: Embryophytes
- Clade: Tracheophytes
- Clade: Spermatophytes
- Clade: Angiosperms
- Clade: Eudicots
- Clade: Asterids
- Order: Lamiales
- Family: Oleaceae
- Genus: Fraxinus
- Species: F. papillosa

Binomial name
- Fraxinus papillosa Lingelsh.

Synonyms
- Fraxinus velutina var. papillosa (Lingelsh.) A.E.Murray; Fraxinus velutina subsp. papillosa (Lingelsh.) A.E.Murray

= Fraxinus papillosa =

Species of flowering plant

Fraxinus papillosa, or the Chihuahuan ash, is a species of flowering plant in the family Oleaceae, native to the deserts of Mexico and the southwestern United States. A small tree, it usually is found growing in canyon bottoms and on north-facing slopes.
