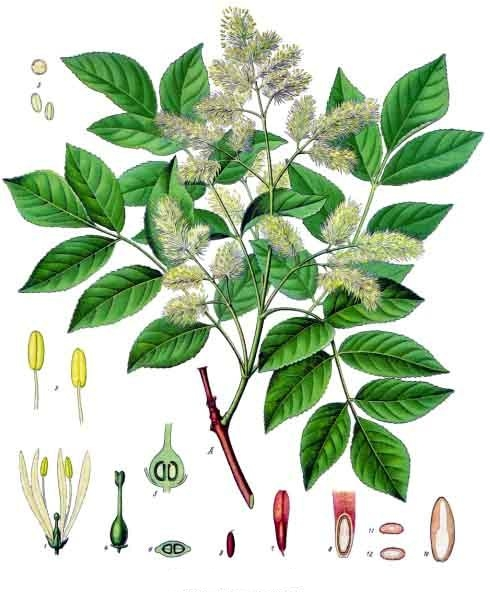
- Fraxinus ornus 1862 illustration

Scientific classification
- Kingdom: Plantae
- Clade: Tracheophytes
- Clade: Angiosperms
- Clade: Eudicots
- Clade: Asterids
- Order: Lamiales
- Family: Oleaceae
- Tribe: Oleeae
- Subtribe: Fraxininae
- Genus: Fraxinus; L.

Synonyms
- Ornus Boehm.; Fraxinoides Medik.; Mannaphorus Raf.; Calycomelia Kostel.; Leptalix Raf.; Ornanthes Raf.; Samarpses Raf.; Aplilia Raf.; Meliopsis Rchb.; Petlomelia Nieuwl.

= Fraxinus =

Genus of plants

Fraxinus (/ˈfræksɪnəs/), commonly called ash, is a genus of plants in the olive and lilac family, Oleaceae, and comprises 45–65 species of usually medium-to-large trees, most of which are deciduous (dropping their leaves in autumn), although some subtropical species are evergreen. The genus is widespread throughout much of Europe, Asia, and North America.

The leaves are usually opposite, and mostly pinnately compound (divided into leaflets in a feather-like arrangement). The seeds, known as "keys", are botanically fruits of the type called samara. Some species are dioecious, having male and female flowers on separate plants.

Ash wood is strong and elastic, and used for the handles of tools. Musical instrument makers use it for electric guitars and for drum shells. The Morgan Motor Company makes the frames of sports cars from ash wood. In Greek mythology, the Meliae were the nymphs of ash trees.

== Etymology ==
The tree's common English name, "ash", derives from the Old English æsc, from the Proto-Indo-European name for the tree, while the name of the genus originated in Latin frāxinus, from a Proto-Indo-European word for birch. Both words also meant "spear", as ash wood was used for shafts.

== Description ==
The leaves of ash trees are usually opposite (rarely in whorls), and mostly pinnate. The seeds, known as "keys", are botanically single-winged fruits of the type called samara. Most Fraxinus species are dioecious, having male and female flowers on separate plants. The male flowers have two stamens. If a calyx is present, it has four lobes; if there is a corolla, it has four lobes or four petals, which are white or pale yellow.

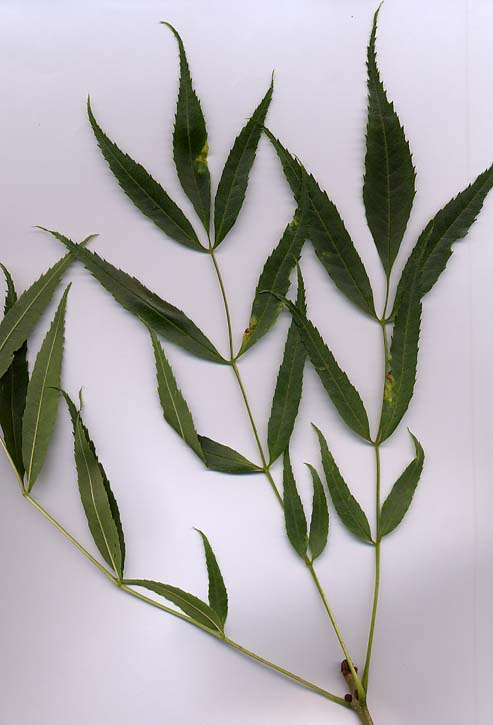
Leafy shoot of F. angustifolia

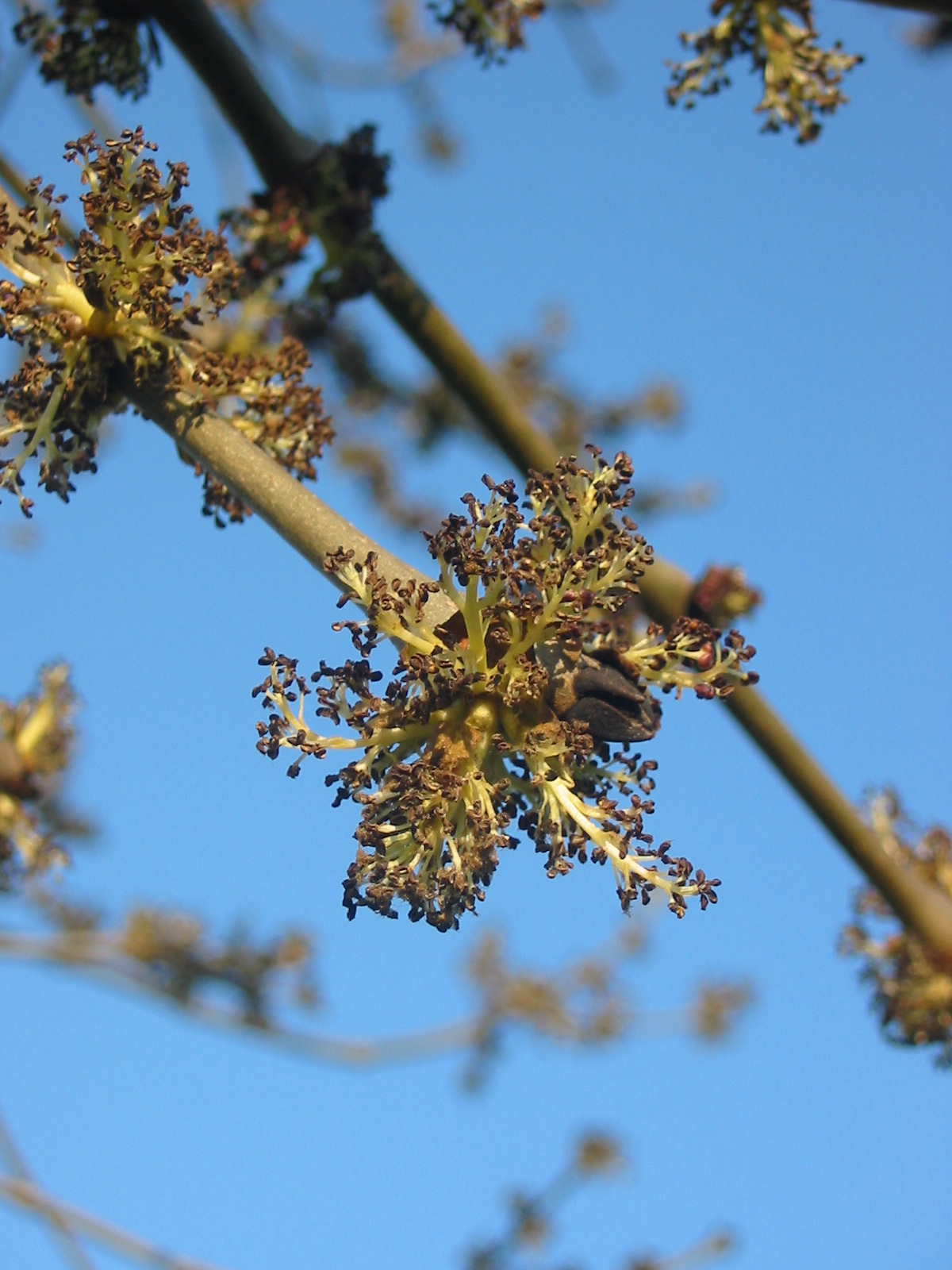
Flowers of F. excelsior

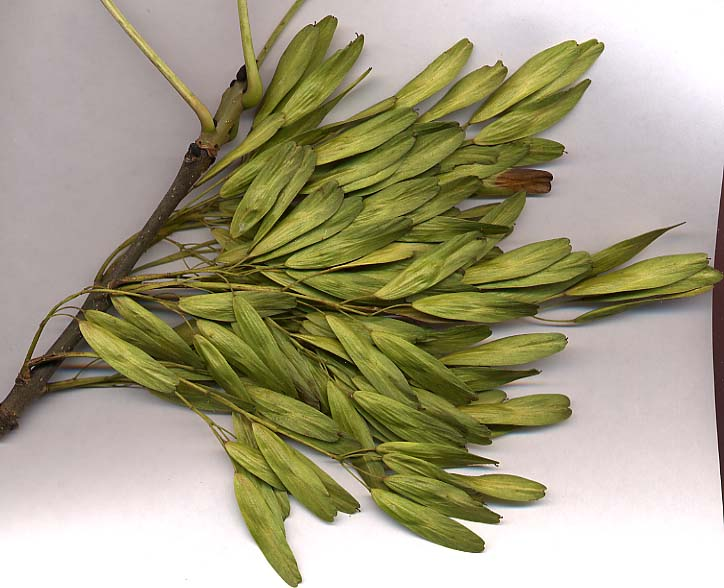
Winged fruits (samaras) of F. excelsior

== Evolution ==
=== Fossil history ===
The oldest fossils that are clearly Fraxinus are from the Middle Eocene (49–39 million years ago) of southeast North America, including the extinct species F. wilcoxiana. Fossil pollen of F. angustifolia is known from the Upper Miocene (12 million years ago) of Europe. F. oishii winged fruits have been found in the Middle Miocene of Korea.

=== Taxonomy ===
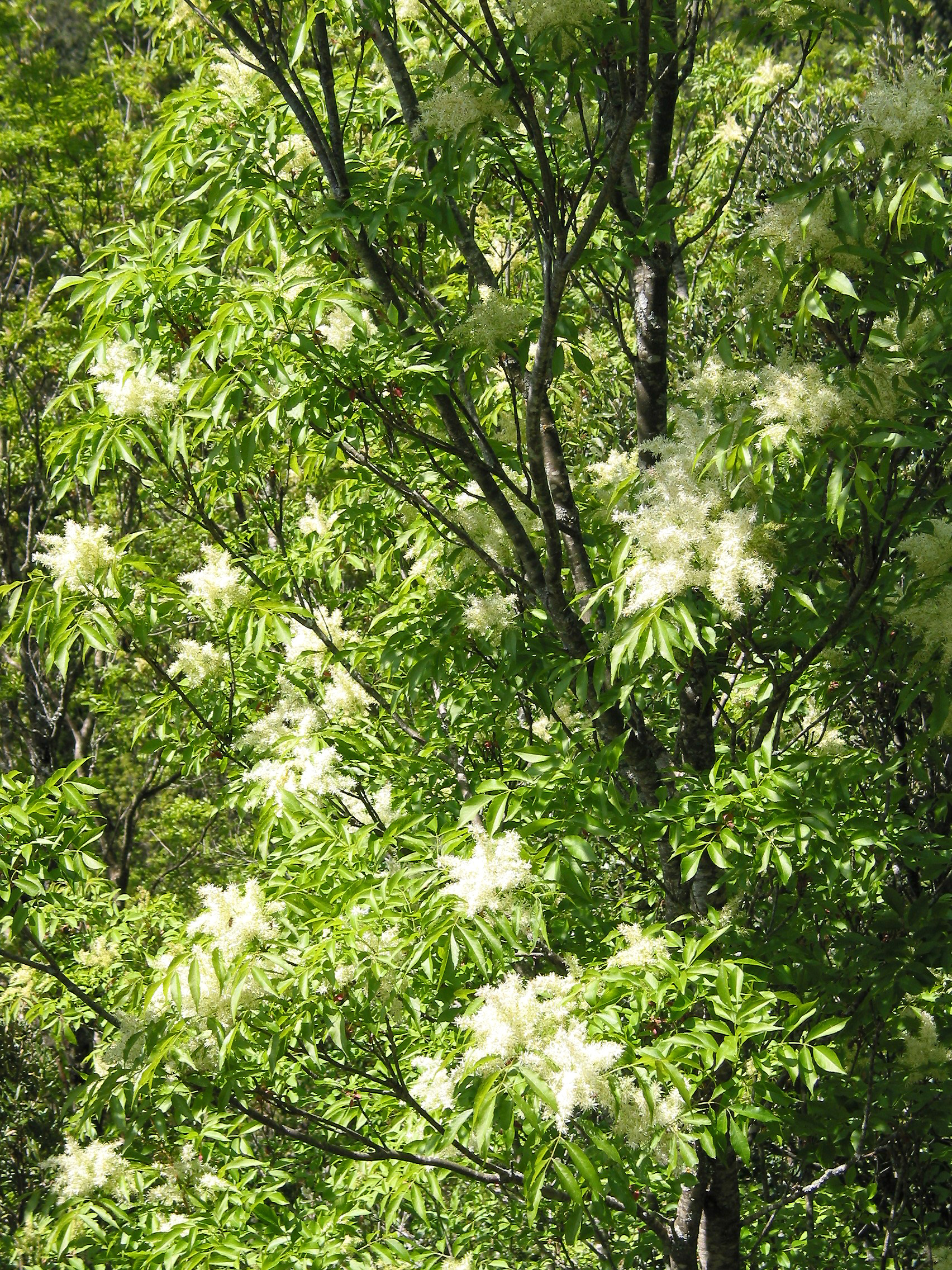
Fraxinus ornus

The genus Fraxinus was described by Carl Linnaeus in 1753. The name remains accepted by taxonomists. Multiple authors have described other tree genera that are synonymous with Fraxinus: Ornus by the German botanist and physician Georg Rudolf Boehmer in 1760; Fraxinoides by the German physician Friedrich Kasimir Medikus in 1791; Mannaphorus by the French polymath Constantine Samuel Rafinesque in 1818; Calycomelia by the Czech Vincenz Franz Kosteletzky in 1834; Leptalix, Ornanthes, Samarpsea (misspelt) and Samarpses, Apilia and Aplilia by Rafinesque, all in 1838; Meliopsis by the German botanist Ludwig Reichenbach in 1841; and Petlomelia by the Belgian priest Julius Nieuwland in 1914.

=== External phylogeny ===
The Angiosperm Phylogeny Group has classified Fraxinus as part of the Oleaceae (the olive family of flowering woody plants), within the order Lamiales (the mint order, including many aromatic herbs).

- Lamiales
  - Plocospermataceae
  - - - Carlemanniaceae
      - Oleaceae
        - Forsythieae, etc
        - - Jasmineae
          - Oleeae
            - Syringa, Ligustrum
            - - Comoranthus, Schrebera
              - - Fraxinus
                - Olea (olive), other genera
    - many other families

=== Internal phylogeny ===
Species are arranged into sections identified by phylogenetic analysis of clades within the Fraxinus genus:

- Fraxinus
  - section Dipetalae
  - - section Melioides
    - - section Pauciflorae
      - - section Ornus
        - - section Fraxinus
          - section Sciadanthus

Section Dipetalae

- Fraxinus anomala Torr. ex S.Watson – singleleaf ash
- Fraxinus dipetala Hook. & Arn. – California ash or two-petal ash
- Fraxinus parryi Moran – Chaparral ash
- Fraxinus quadrangulata Michx. – blue ash
- Fraxinus trifoliolata

Section Fraxinus

- Fraxinus angustifolia Vahl – narrow-leaved ash
  - Fraxinus angustifolia subsp. oxycarpa – Caucasian ash
  - Fraxinus angustifolia subsp. syriaca
- Fraxinus excelsior L. – European ash
- Fraxinus mandschurica Rupr. – Manchurian ash
- Fraxinus nigra Marshall – black ash
- Fraxinus pallisiae Wilmott – Pallis' ash
- Fraxinus sogdiana Bunge – Tianshan ash

Section Melioides sensu lato

- Fraxinus chiisanensis Nakai – Jirisan ash
- Fraxinus cuspidata Torr. – fragrant ash
- Fraxinus platypoda Oliv. – Chinese red ash
- Fraxinus spaethiana Lingelsh. – Späth's ash

Section Melioides sensu stricto

- Fraxinus albicans Buckley – Texas ash
- Fraxinus americana L. – white ash or American ash
- Fraxinus berlandieriana DC. – Mexican ash
- Fraxinus caroliniana Mill. – Carolina ash
- Fraxinus latifolia Benth. – Oregon ash
- Fraxinus papillosa Lingelsh. – Chihuahua ash
- Fraxinus pennsylvanica Marshall – green ash
- Fraxinus profunda (Bush) Bush – pumpkin ash
- Fraxinus uhdei (Wenz.) Lingelsh. – Shamel ash or Tropical ash
- Fraxinus velutina Torr. – velvet ash or Arizona ash

Section Ornus

- Fraxinus apertisquamifera
- Fraxinus baroniana
- Fraxinus bungeana DC. – Bunge's ash
- Fraxinus chinensis Roxb. – Chinese ash or Korean ash
- Fraxinus floribunda Wall. – Himalayan manna ash
- Fraxinus griffithii C.B.Clarke – Griffith's ash
- Fraxinus insularis Hemsl. – Chinese flowering ash
- Fraxinus japonica – Japanese ash
- Fraxinus lanuginosa – Japanese ash
- Fraxinus longicuspis
- Fraxinus malacophylla
- Fraxinus micrantha Lingelsh.
- Fraxinus ornus L. – manna ash or flowering ash
- Fraxinus paxiana Lingelsh.
- Fraxinus sieboldiana Blume – Japanese flowering ash

Section Pauciflorae

- Fraxinus dubia
- Fraxinus gooddingii – Goodding's ash
- Fraxinus greggii A.Gray – Gregg's ash
- Fraxinus purpusii
- Fraxinus rufescens

Section Sciadanthus

- Fraxinus dimorpha
- Fraxinus hubeiensis Ch'u & Shang & Su – 湖北梣, Hubei qin
- Fraxinus xanthoxyloides (G.Don) Wall. ex DC. – Afghan ash

== Ecology and distribution ==
The genus Fraxinus is widespread throughout much of Europe, Asia, and North America. The genus is primarily temperate or subtropical; 22 of the species occur in China, while for example Italy has 4 species. Both native and introduced Fraxinus species occur in almost every contiguous state of the United States and all the southern provinces of Canada.

Ash species provide habitat and food for the larvae of many insects including long-horn beetles, plant bugs, lace bugs, aphids, and caterpillars, as well as birds and mammals.

The emerald ash borer (Agrilus planipennis), is a wood-boring beetle accidentally introduced to North America from eastern Asia via solid wood packing material in the late 1980s to early 1990s. It has killed tens of millions of trees in 22 states in the United States and neighbouring Ontario and Quebec in Canada. It threatens some seven billion ash trees in North America. Three native Asian wasp species, natural predators of the beetle, have been evaluated as possible biological controls. The public was cautioned to avoid transporting unfinished wood products, such as firewood, to slow the spread of the pest. Damage occurs when emerald ash borer larvae feed on the inner bark, phloem of ash trees, preventing nutrient and water transportation.

The European ash, Fraxinus excelsior, has been affected by the fungus Hymenoscyphus fraxineus, causing chalara ash dieback in a large number of trees since the mid-1990s, particularly in eastern and northern Europe. The disease has infected about 90% of Denmark's ash trees. In 2012 in the UK, ash dieback was found in mature woodland. The combination of emerald ash borer and ash dieback has threatened ash populations in Europe, but trees in mixed landscapes appear to have some resistance to the disease.

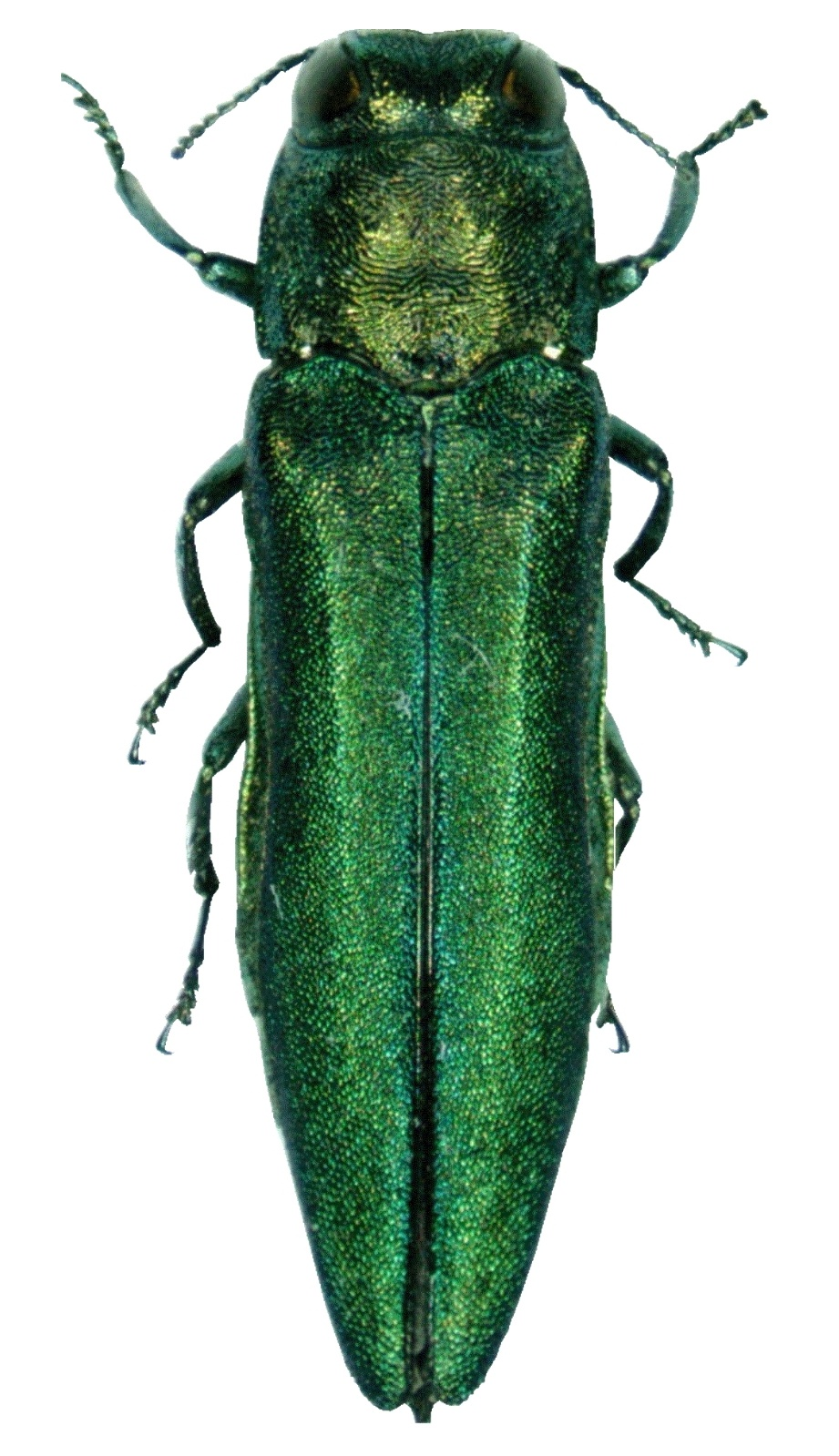
Emerald ash borer
adult

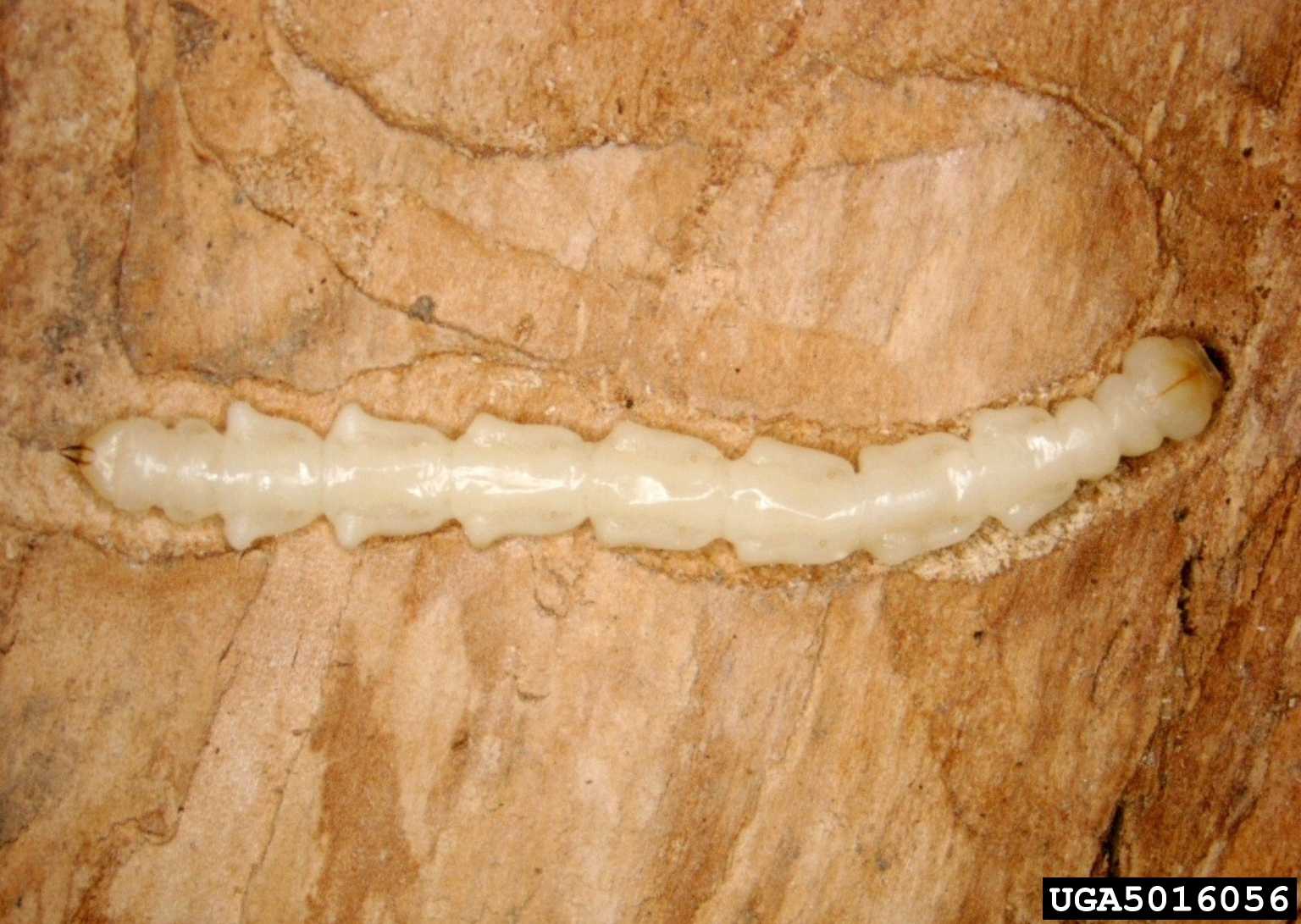
Emerald ash borer larva

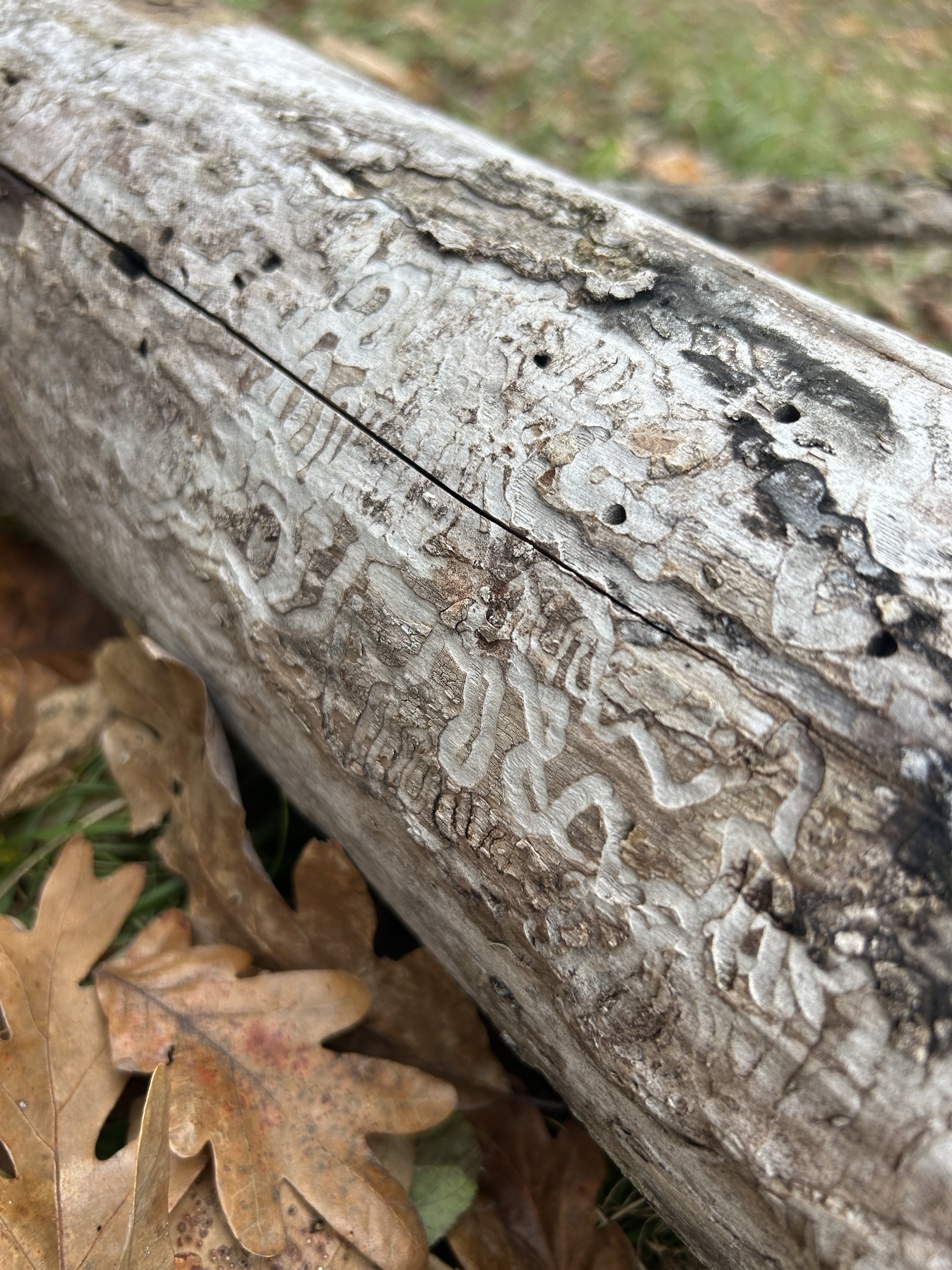
Emerald ash borer damage on a fallen trunk

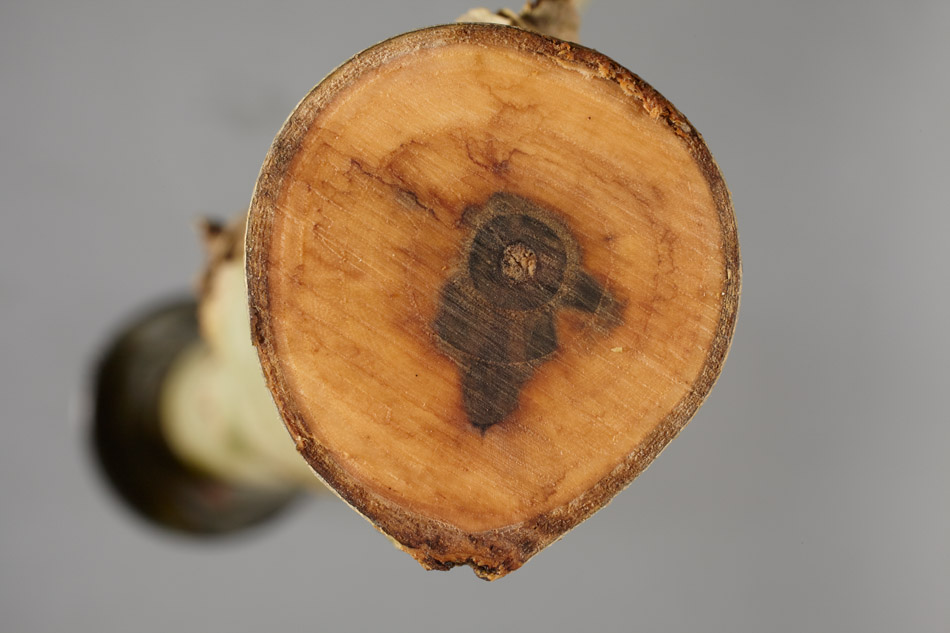
Chalara ash dieback

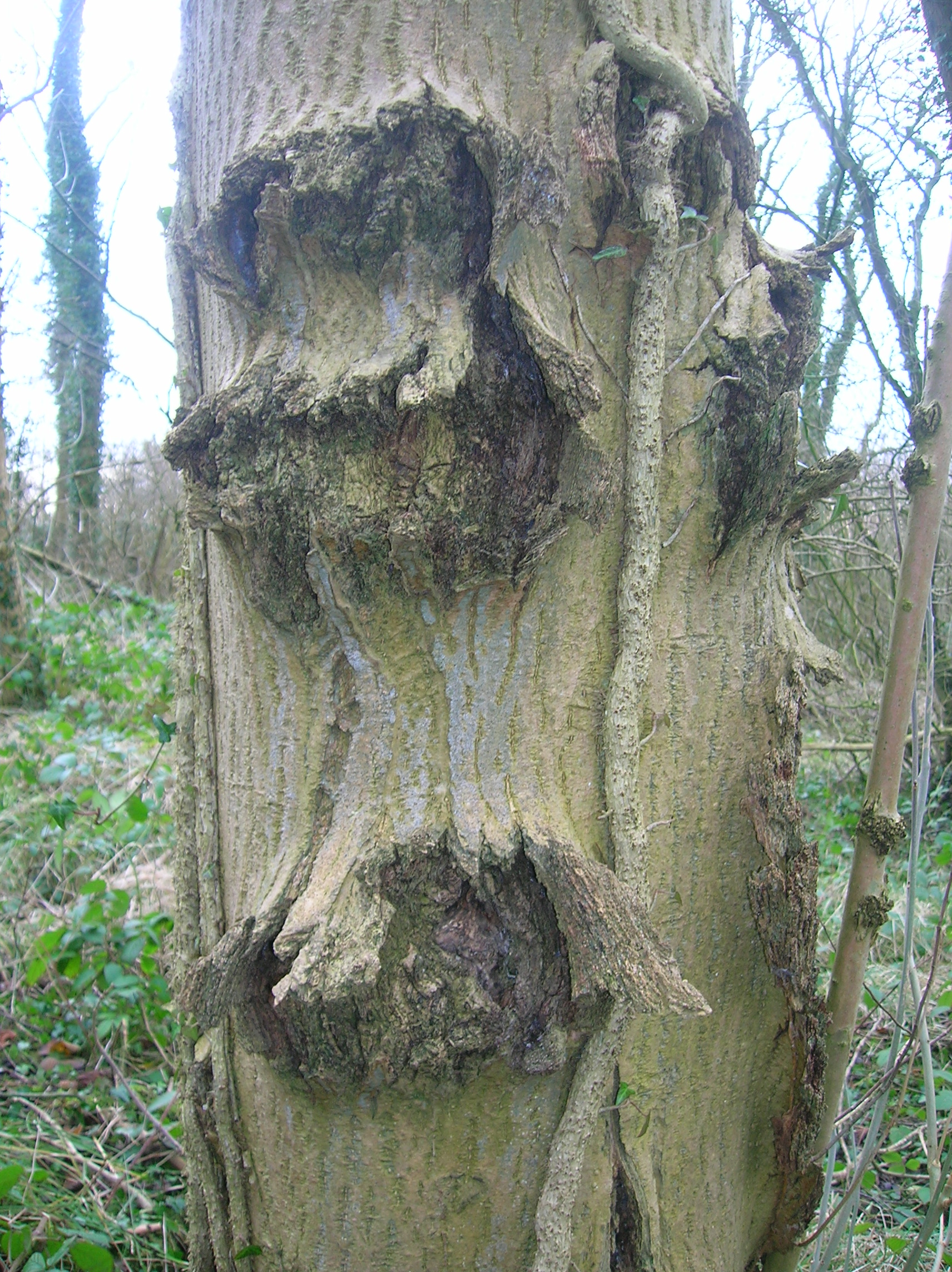
Canker on an ash tree

== Uses ==
Ash is a hardwood and is dense, around 670 kg/m^{3} for Fraxinus americana, the white ash, and 710 kg/m^{3} for Fraxinus excelsior, the European ash. The wood of the European ash is strong and elastic, making it suitable for uses such as the handles of tools. It is a good firewood.

The Fender musical instrument company has used ash as a tonewood for its electric guitars since 1950. Species used for guitar building include swamp ash. Ash is in addition used for making drum shells. It has been described as resonant, providing a balanced tone for both high and low notes. Ash wood can be used for furniture, agricultural tools, and household objects such as bowls, candlesticks, and spoons. The Morgan Motor Company of Great Britain still manufactures sports cars with frames made from ash.

The green ash (F. pennsylvanica) is widely planted as a street tree in the United States. The inner bark of the blue ash (F. quadrangulata) has been used as a source for blue dye. In Sicily, Italy, a sugary manna is obtained from the resinous sap of the manna ash, extracted by making cuts in the bark. The young seedpods of the European ash, known as "keys", are edible; in Britain, they are traditionally pickled with vinegar, sugar and spices. A range of pharmacologically active compounds exist in Fraxinus species, with for example anti-inflammatory, antihypertensive, and antihyperglycaemic properties which might find practical applications.

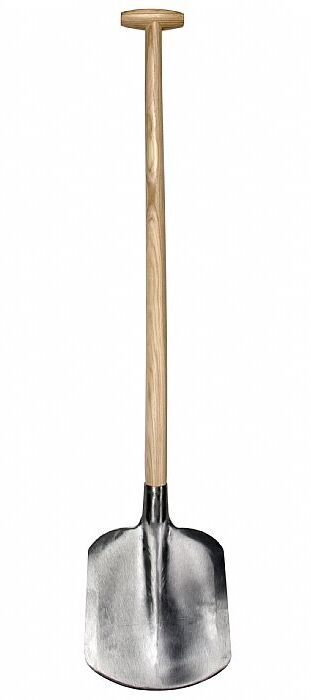
Ash is widely used for tool handles.

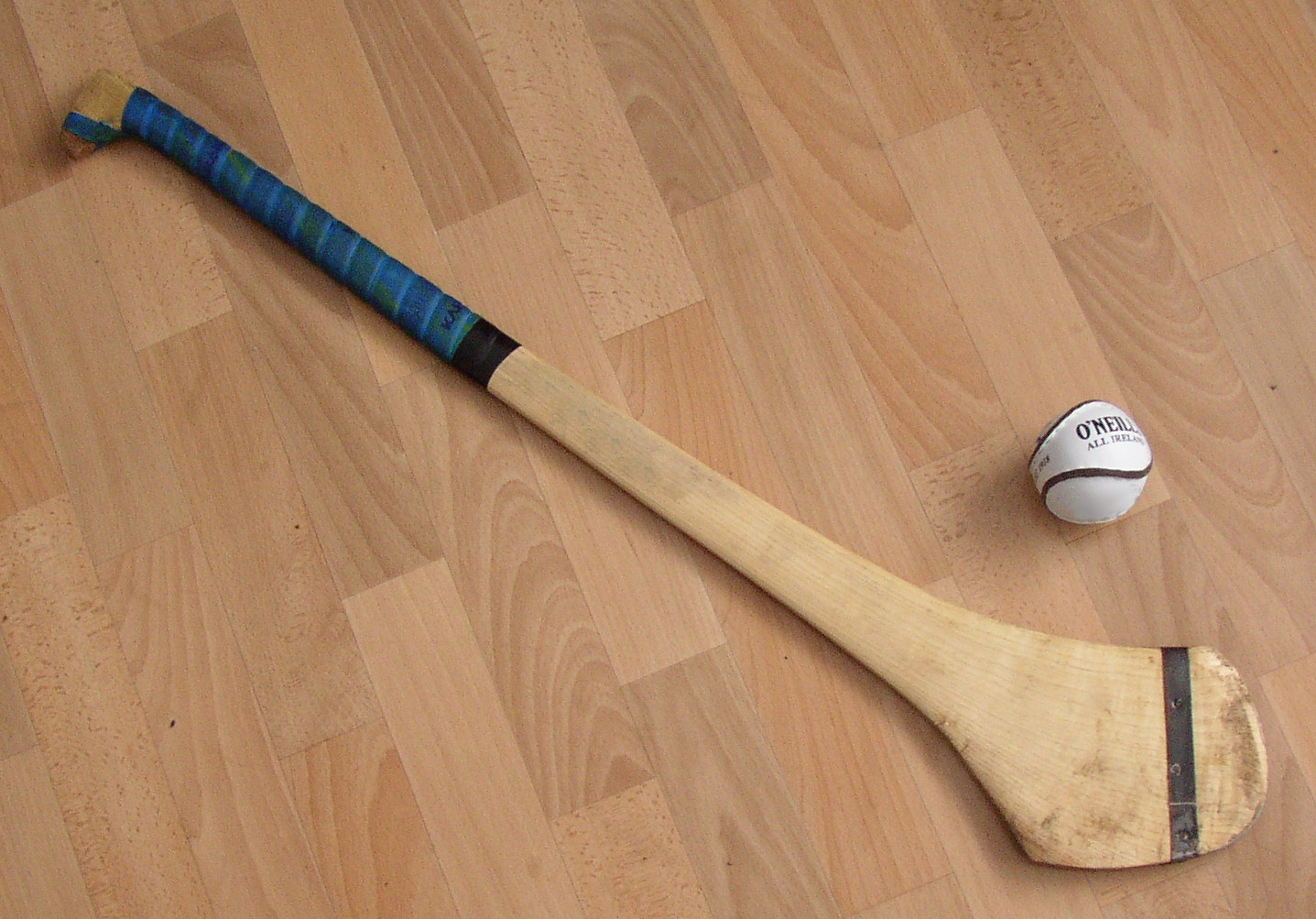
Hurley (playing stick used in hurling and camogie)

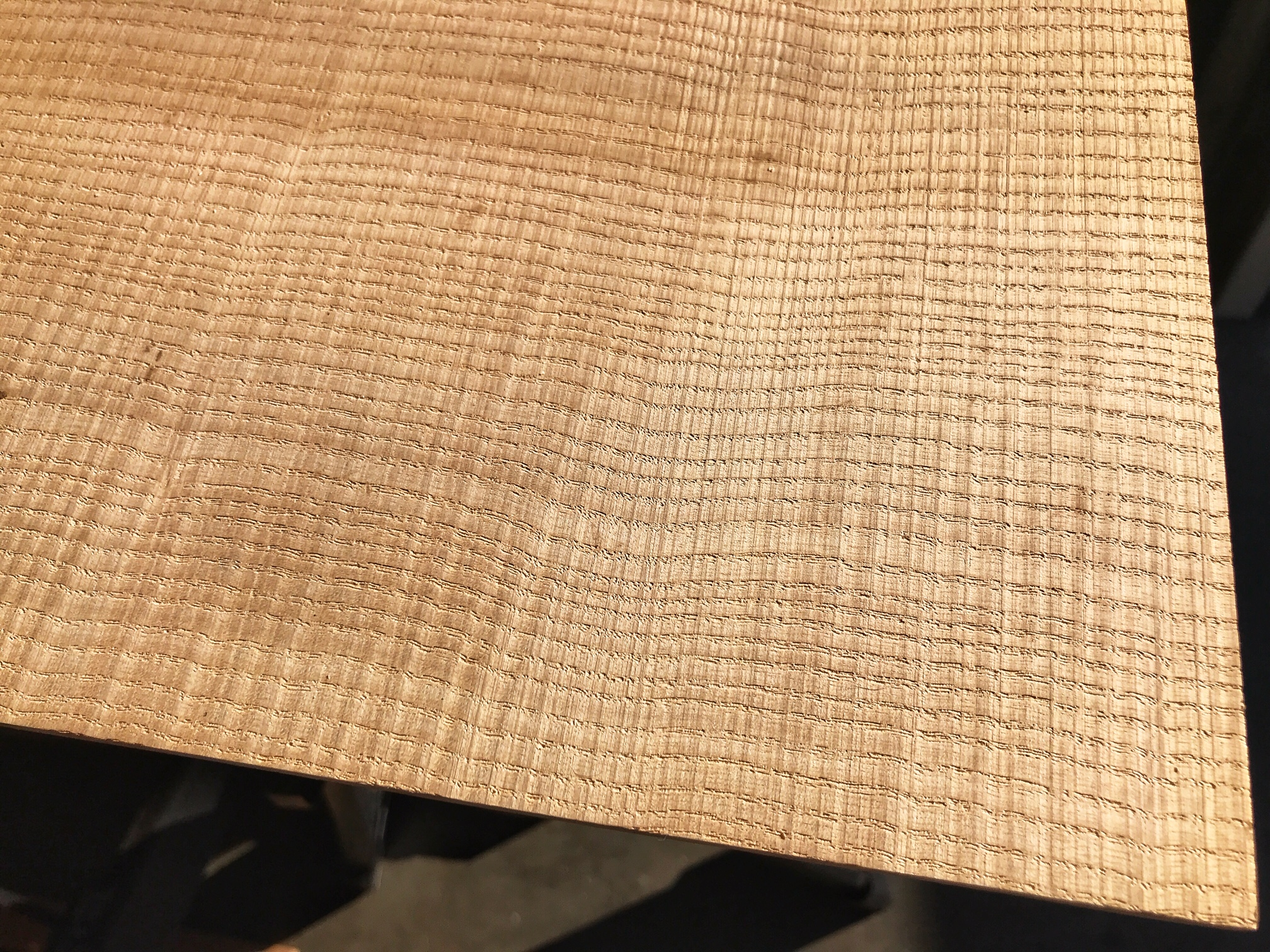
5/16" thick flame figure quartersawn ash guitar top, unmilled

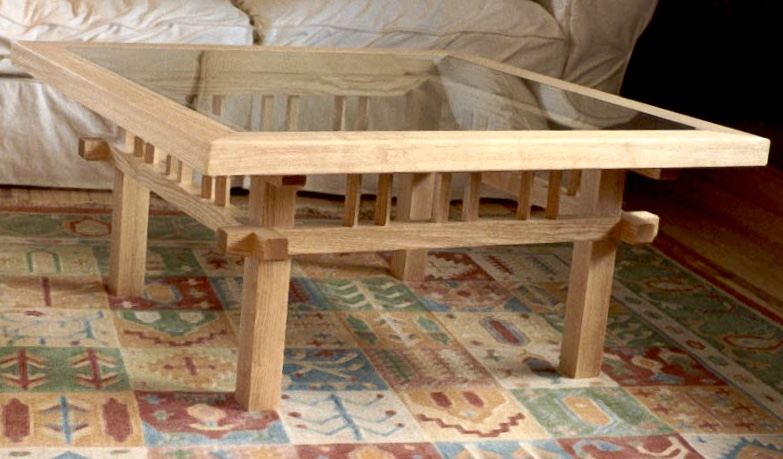
Ash coffee table

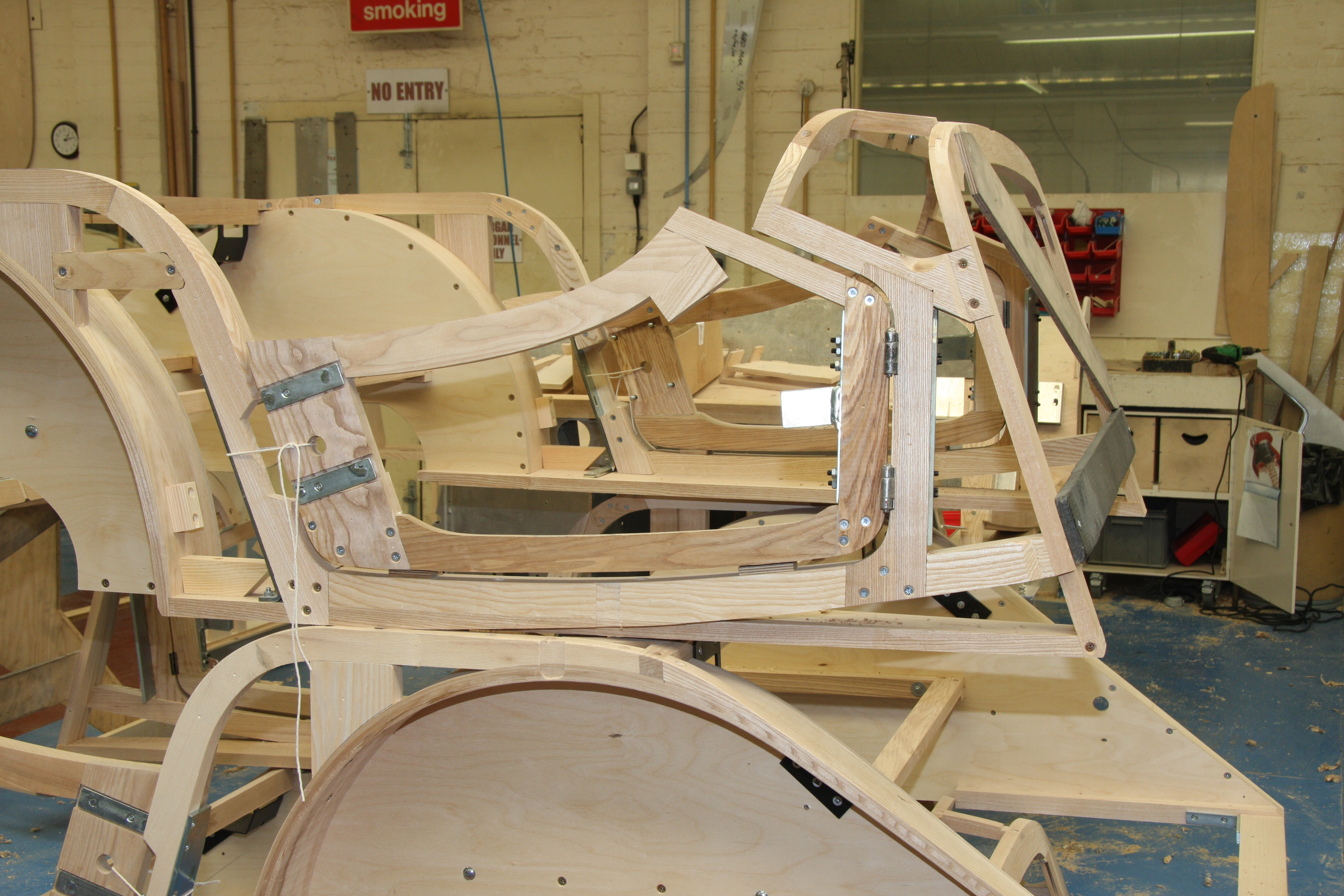
Ash frame of a
Morgan Motor Company car

== Mythology and folklore ==
"The Ash Grove"
Traditional melody

In Greek mythology, the Meliae, their name meaning "ash trees", are nymphs associated with the ash, perhaps specifically of the manna ash (Fraxinus ornus), as dryads were nymphs associated with the oak. They appear in Hesiod's Theogony, which states that they were born when drops of Ouranos's blood fell on the earth (Gaia). In Norse mythology, a vast, evergreen ash tree Yggdrasil ("the steed (gallows) of Odin"), watered by three magical springs, serves as axis mundi, sustaining the nine worlds of the cosmos in its roots and branches. Askr, the first man in Norse myth, literally means 'ash'. In Slavic folklore, an ash stake could be used to kill a vampire. In the Old English Latin alphabet, Æ was the letter æsc, "ash tree". This transliterated the Anglo-Saxon futhorc rune ᚫ.

The Welsh folk song "Llwyn Onn", "The Ash Grove", sung in the English version by John Oxenford: "The ash grove, how graceful, how plainly 'tis speaking; The lark through its branches is gazing on me".
