= Fraxinus dubia =

Scientific classification
- Kingdom: Plantae
- Clade: Tracheophytes
- Clade: Angiosperms
- Clade: Eudicots
- Clade: Asterids
- Order: Lamiales
- Family: Oleaceae
- Genus: Fraxinus
- Section: Fraxinus sect. Pauciflorae
- Species: F. dubia

Binomial name
- Fraxinus dubia (Willd. ex Schult. & Schult. f.) P.S. Green & M. Nee

Synonyms
- Fagara dubia Willd. ex Schult. & Schult. f.; Fraxinus petenensis Lundell; Fraxinus schiedeana Schltdl. & Cham.

Species of ash

Fraxinus dubia is a plant species native to Mexico and Central America. It has been reported from Guatemala, Belize, Honduras, Costa Rica, Chiapas and Veracruz.

Fraxinus dubia is a tree up to 11 m (37 feet) tall. Leaves are thick, evergreen, glabrous, up to 15 cm (8 inches) long, (1-)5-9-foliate. Flowers are borne in panicles up to 4 cm (1.6 inches) long. Fruits are about 2.5 cm (1.0 inches) long with oblanceolate wings, the part of the fruit containing the seed about 8 mm (0.3 inches) long.
