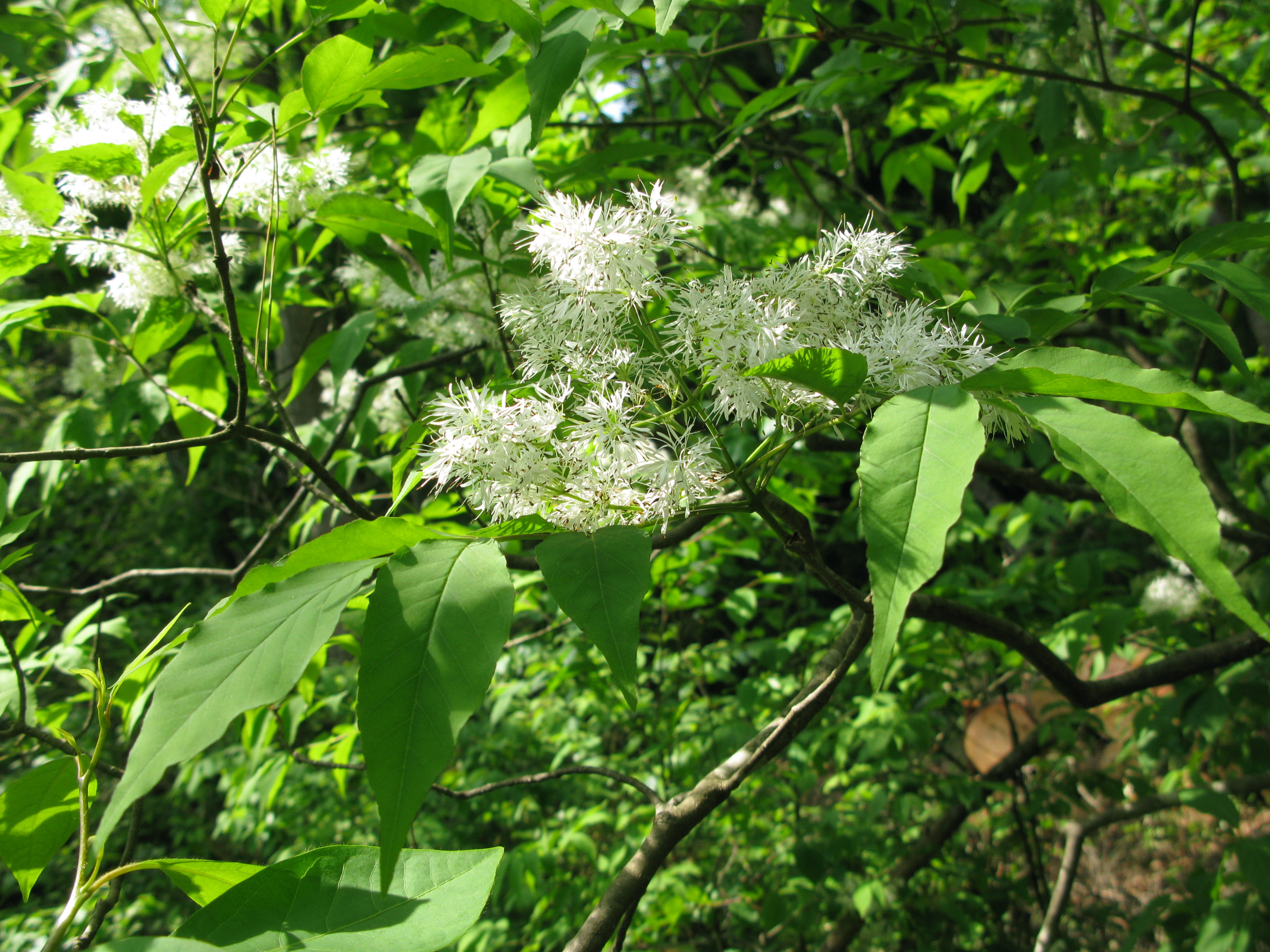
- Flowers and leaves
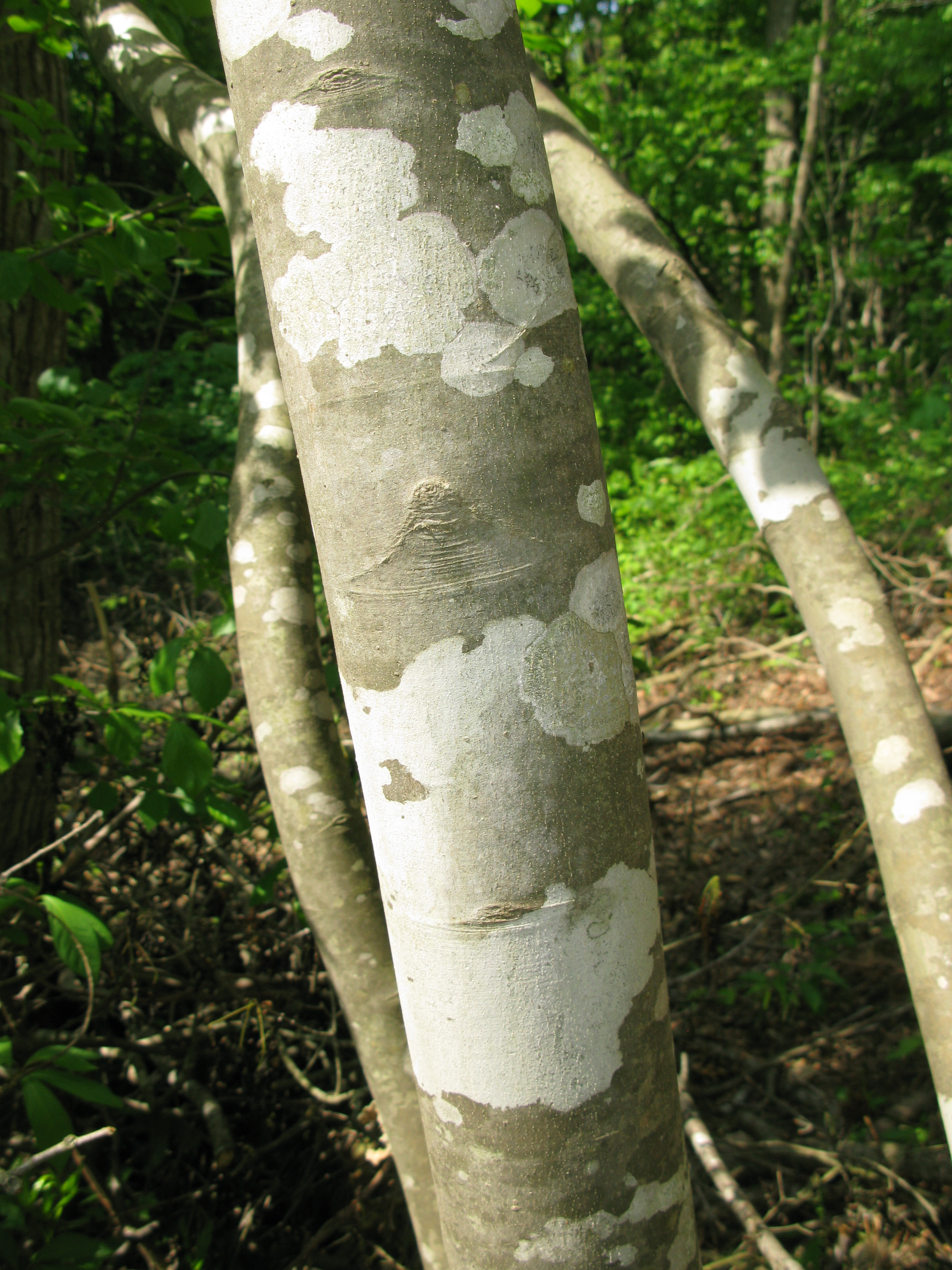
- Bark

Scientific classification
- Kingdom: Plantae
- Clade: Embryophytes
- Clade: Tracheophytes
- Clade: Spermatophytes
- Clade: Angiosperms
- Clade: Eudicots
- Clade: Asterids
- Order: Lamiales
- Family: Oleaceae
- Genus: Fraxinus
- Species: F. sieboldiana

Binomial name
- Fraxinus sieboldiana Blume

Synonyms
- Fraxinus angustata (Blume) Hatus.; Fraxinus mariesii Hook.f.; Fraxinus quadrijuga Nakai; Fraxinus sieboldiana f. quadrijuga (Nakai) M.Kim; Fraxinus tobana Honda

= Fraxinus sieboldiana =

Species of flowering plant

Fraxinus sieboldiana, the Chinese flowering ash or Japanese flowering ash, is a species of flowering plant in the family Oleaceae. It is native to southeastern China, the Korean peninsula, and Japan. It grows on wooded slopes and by streams. It is hardy to USDA zone 6. A variegated cultivar, 'Rising Sun', is available.
