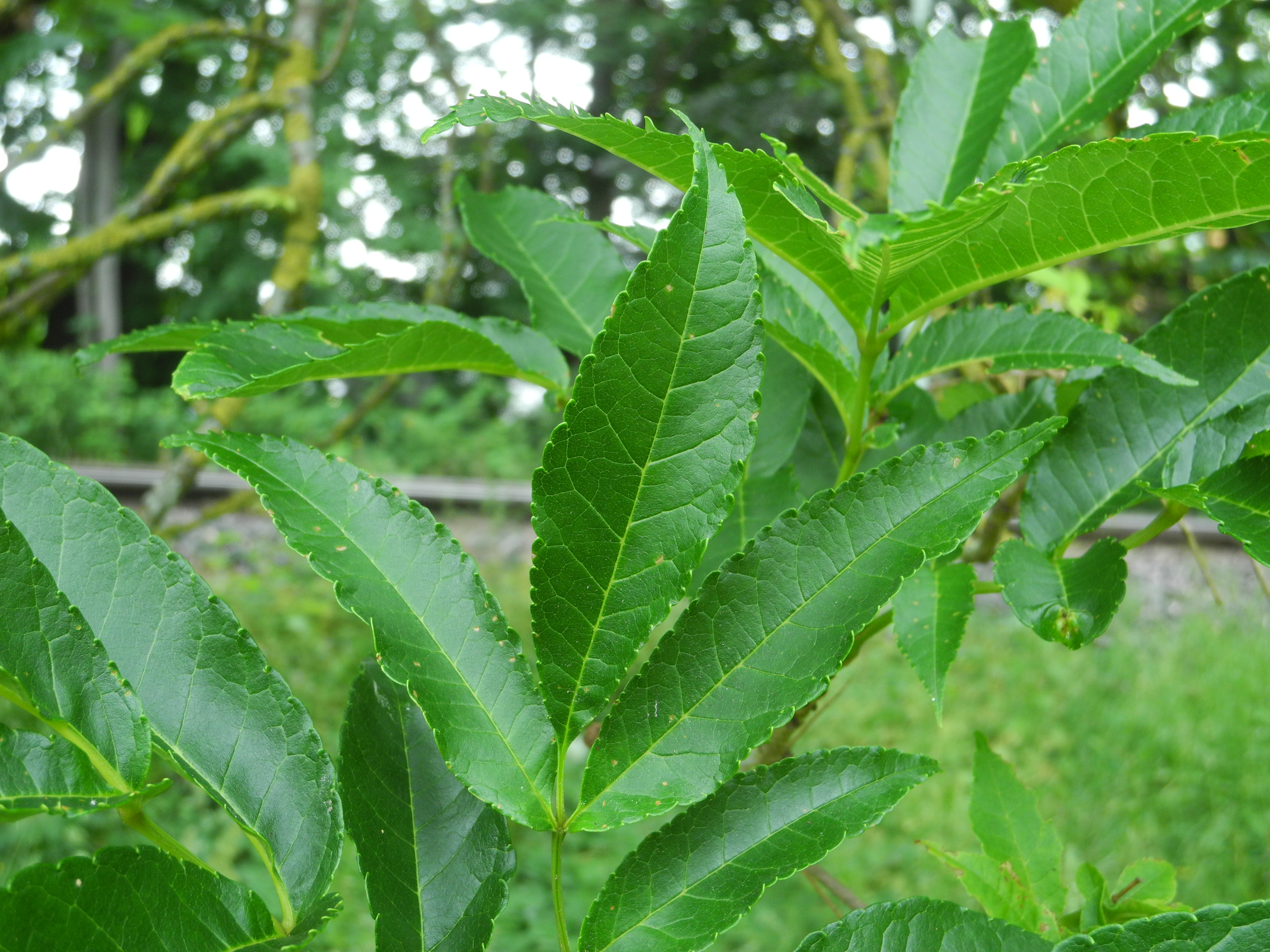
- Leaves
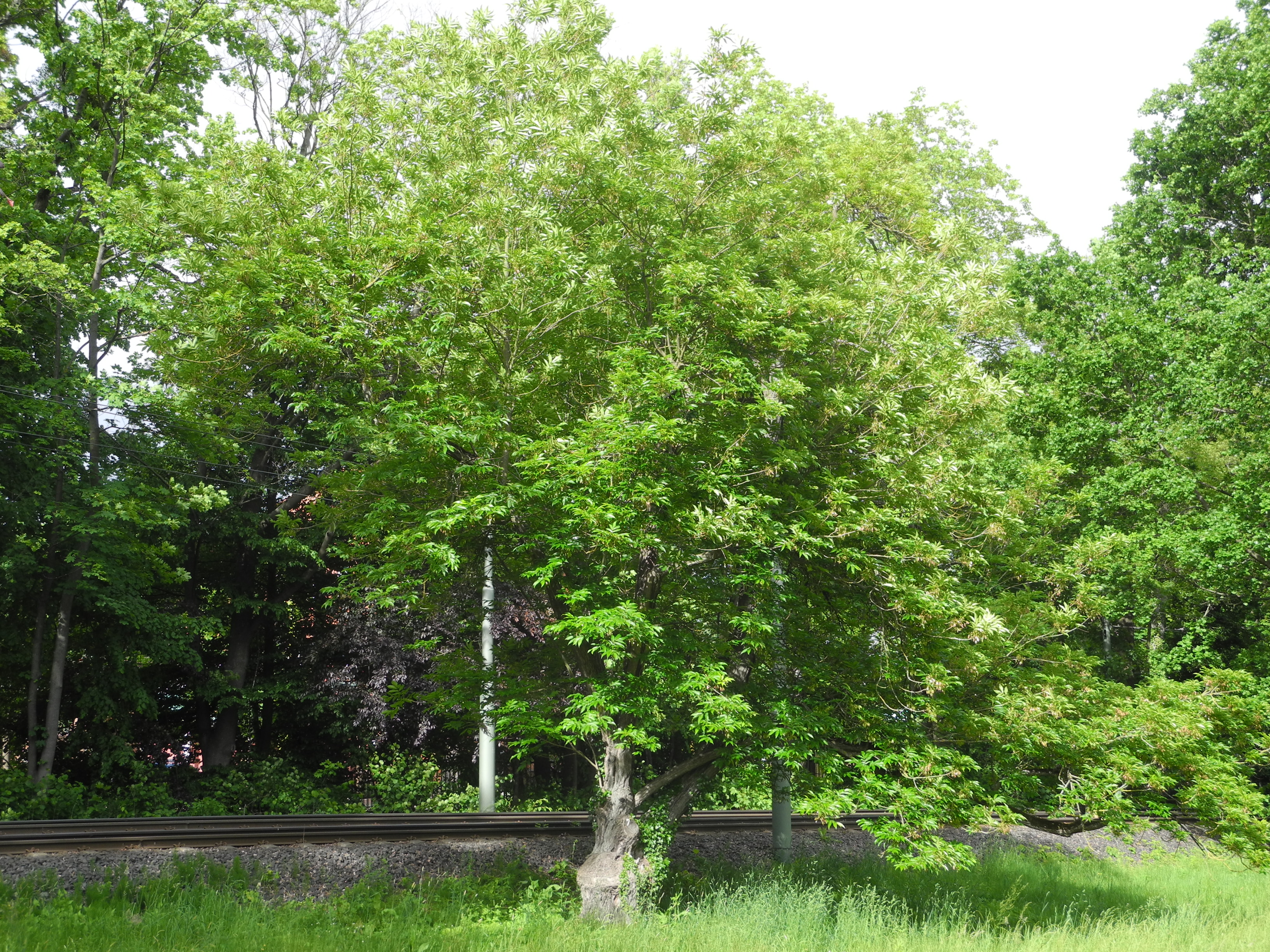
- Habit

Scientific classification
- Kingdom: Plantae
- Clade: Embryophytes
- Clade: Tracheophytes
- Clade: Spermatophytes
- Clade: Angiosperms
- Clade: Eudicots
- Clade: Asterids
- Order: Lamiales
- Family: Oleaceae
- Genus: Fraxinus
- Species: F. platypoda

Binomial name
- Fraxinus platypoda Oliv.

Synonyms
- List: Fraxinus commemoralis Koidz.; Fraxinus inopinata Lingelsh.; Fraxinus longicuspis f. hortensis Lingelsh.; Fraxinus longicuspis var. sambucina (Blume) Lingelsh.; Fraxinus mandshurica var. shiojii Kudô; Fraxinus nipponica Koidz.; Fraxinus platypoda f. nipponica (Koidz.) Yonek.; Fraxinus sambucina (Blume) Koidz.; Fraxinus shikokiana Sugim.; Fraxinus sieboldiana var. sambucina Blume; Fraxinus spaethiana Lingelsh.; Fraxinus spaethiana f. nipponica (Koidz.) Kurata; Fraxinus spaethiana var. nipponica (Koidz.) H.Hara; Fraxinus verecunda Koidz.

= Fraxinus platypoda =

Species of flowering plant

Fraxinus platypoda, the Chinese red ash, is a species of flowering plant in the family Oleaceae, native to central China, and Japan. In the latter stages of succession it often dominates the mountain riparian forest habitat in which it is found.

It has high resistance to the emerald ash borer. A slow-growing deciduous tree, it is used as a street tree in Aarhus, Denmark and Malmö, Sweden.

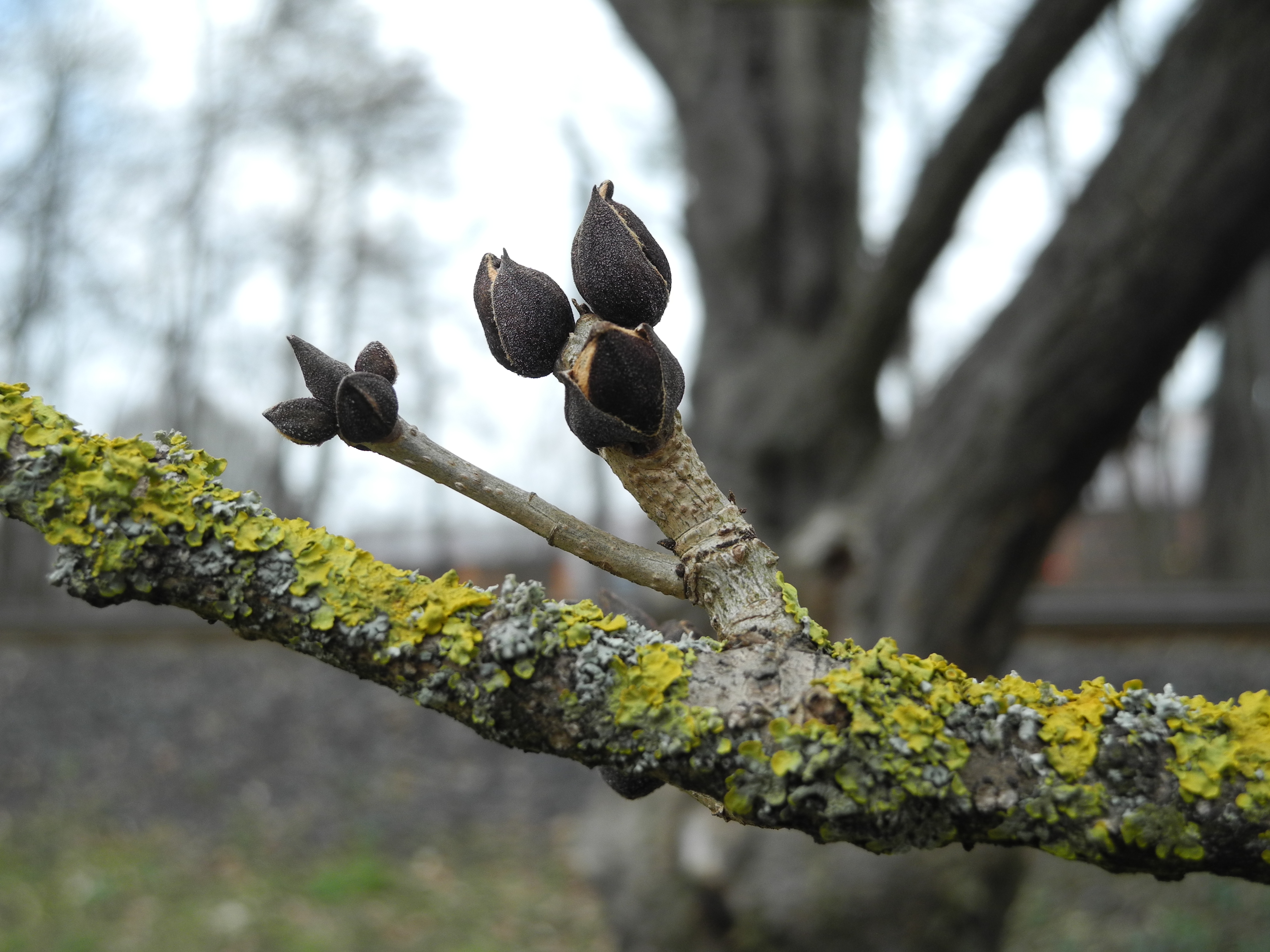
Buds

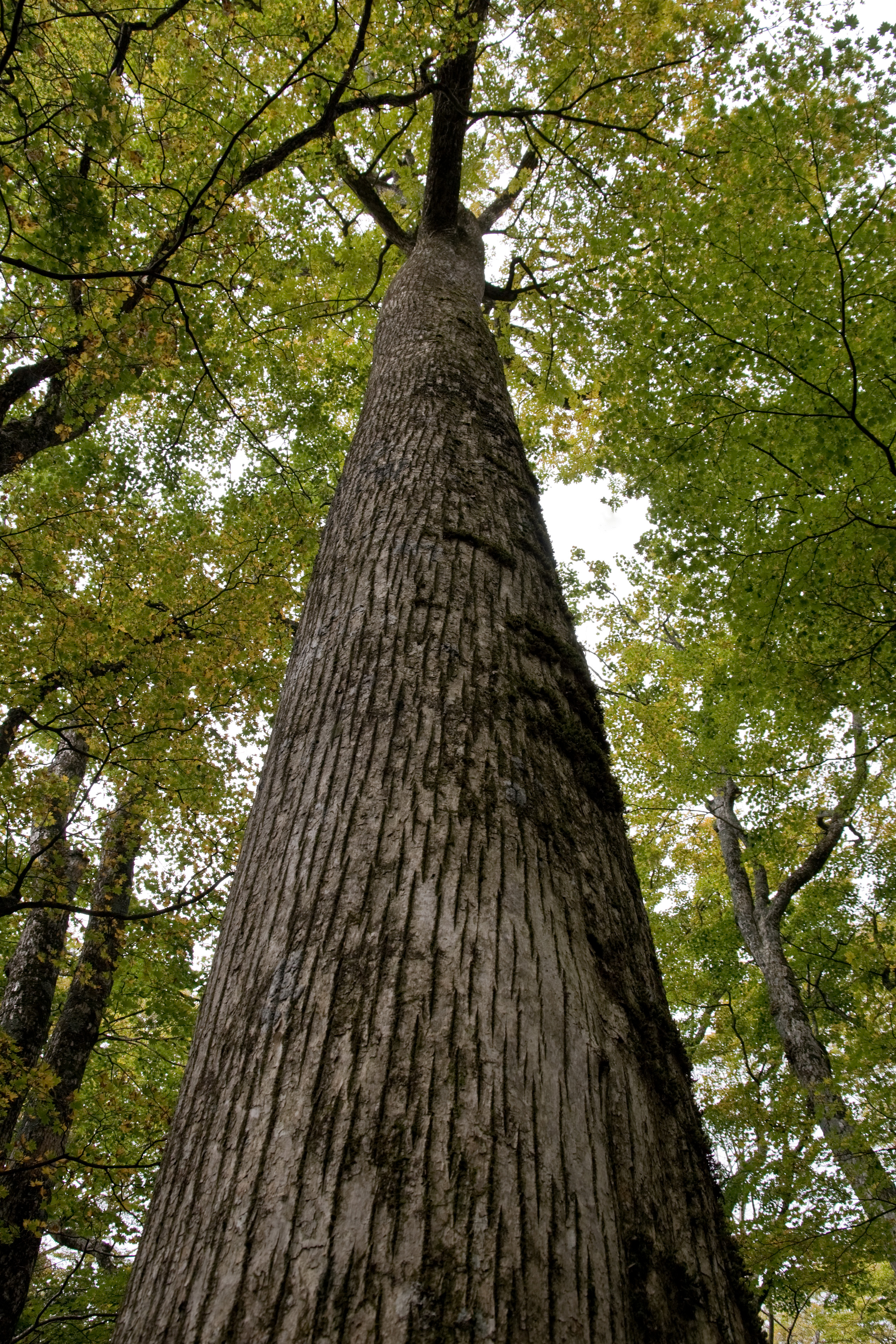
Bole

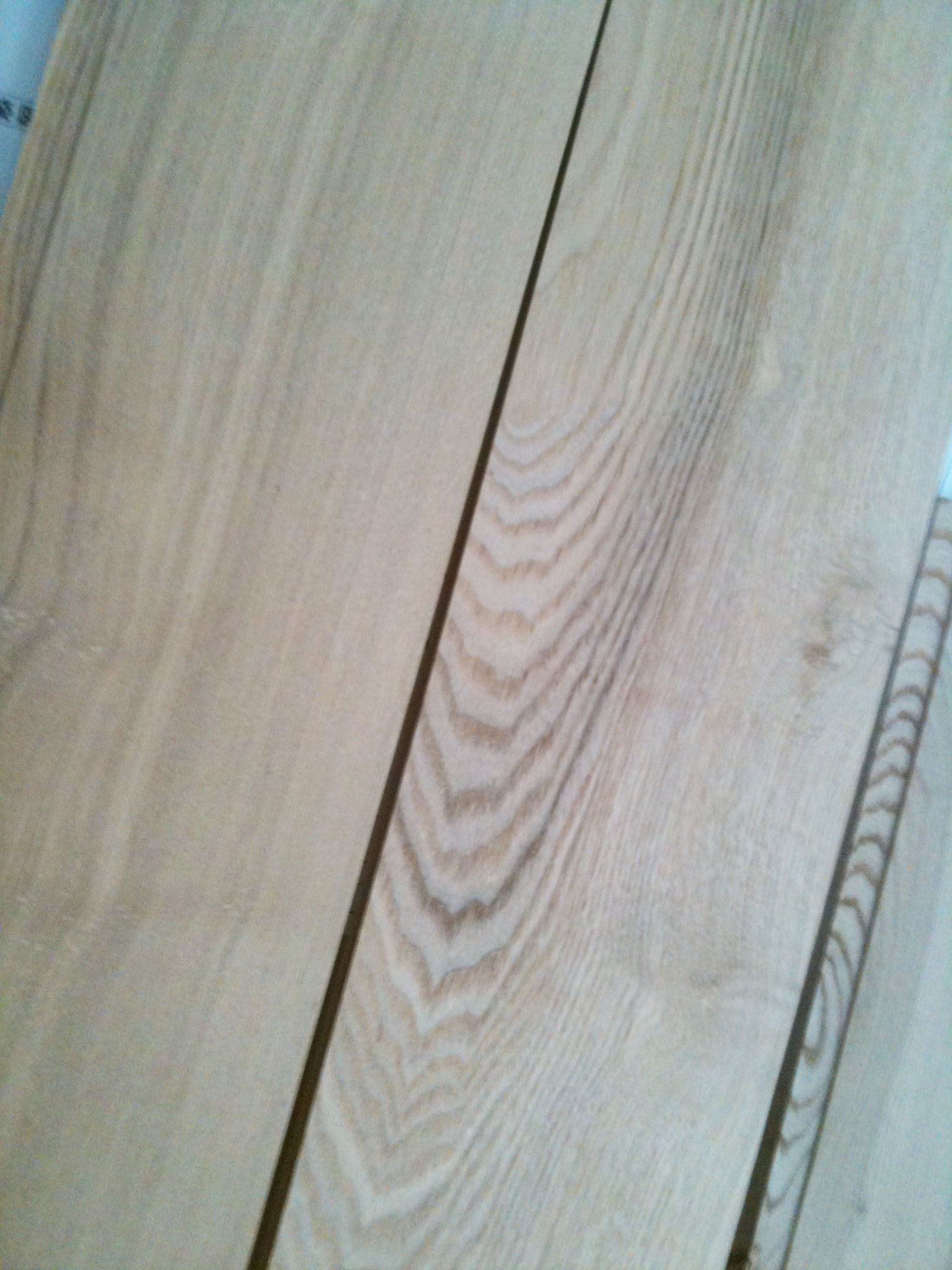
Wood
