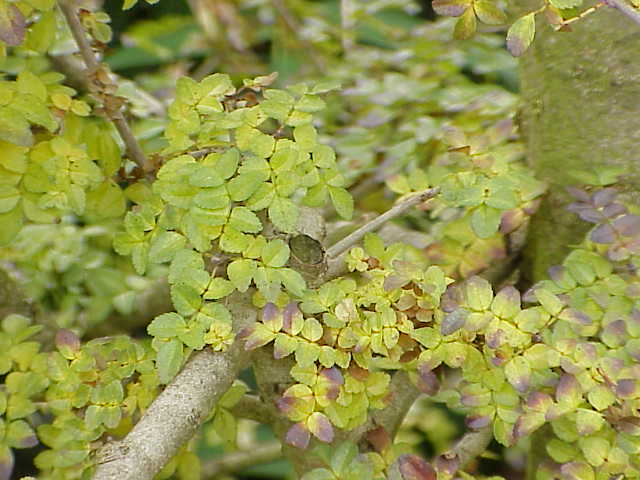

Conservation status
- Least Concern (IUCN 3.1)

Scientific classification
- Kingdom: Plantae
- Clade: Tracheophytes
- Clade: Angiosperms
- Clade: Eudicots
- Clade: Asterids
- Order: Lamiales
- Family: Oleaceae
- Genus: Fraxinus
- Section: Fraxinus sect. Sciadanthus
- Species: F. xanthoxyloides

Binomial name
- Fraxinus xanthoxyloides (G.Don) Wall. ex DC.

= Fraxinus xanthoxyloides =

Species of flowering plant

Fraxinus xanthoxyloides, the Afghan ash or Algerian ash, is a species of ash tree. It is found from Morocco to China. Some authorities originally described the African specimens as a distinct species, Fraxinus dimorpha.
