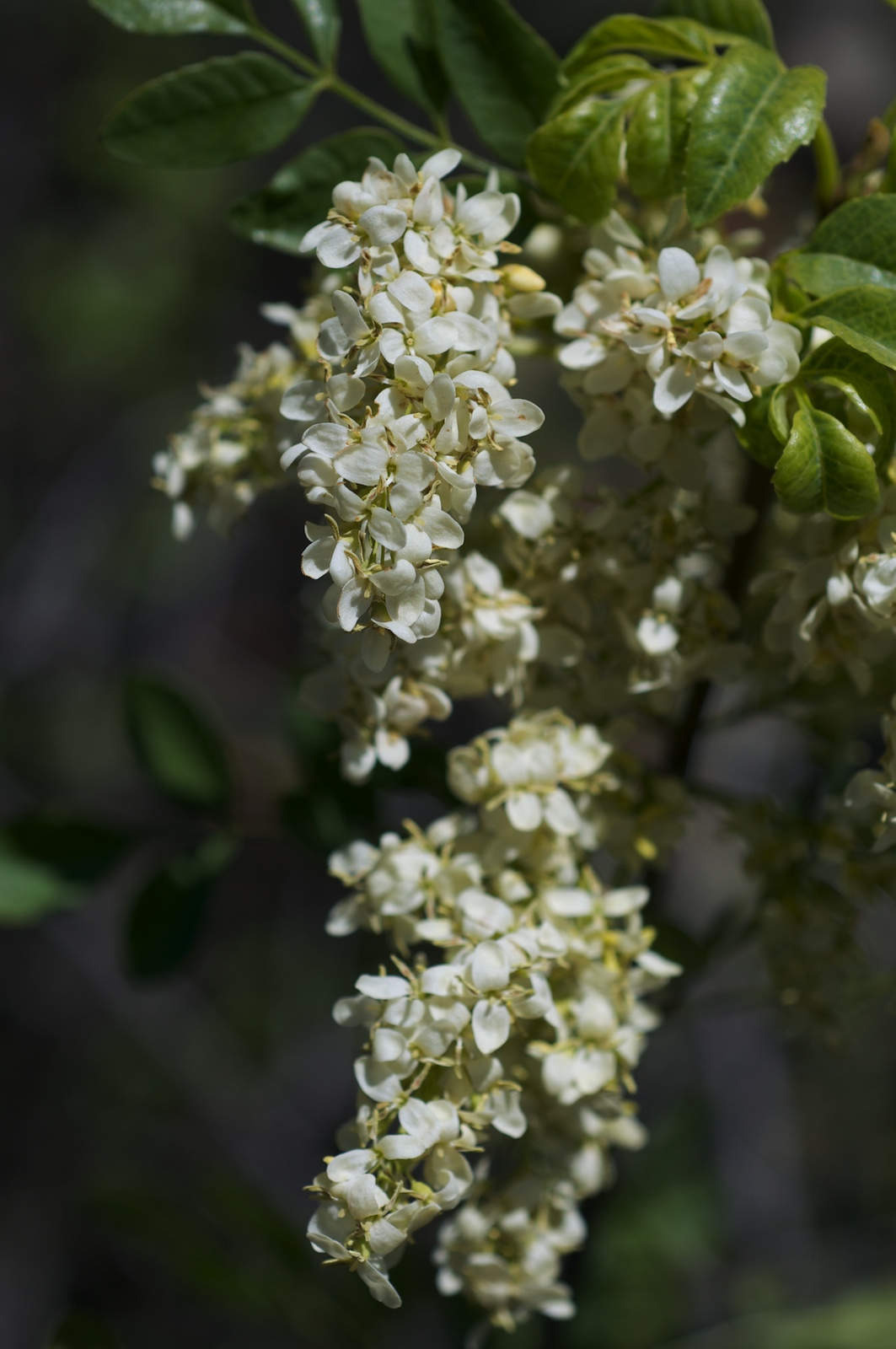

Conservation status
- Least Concern (IUCN 3.1)

Scientific classification
- Kingdom: Plantae
- Clade: Tracheophytes
- Clade: Angiosperms
- Clade: Eudicots
- Clade: Asterids
- Order: Lamiales
- Family: Oleaceae
- Genus: Fraxinus
- Section: Fraxinus sect. Dipetalae
- Species: F. dipetala

Binomial name
- Fraxinus dipetala Hook. & Arn.
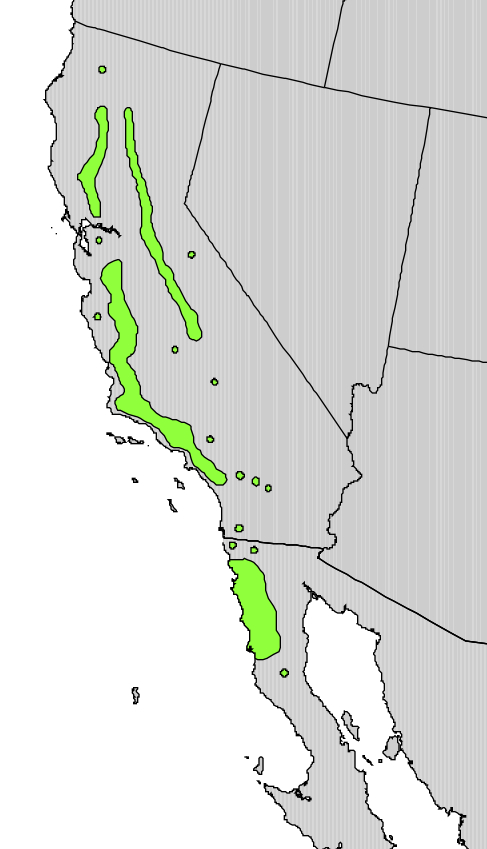
- Natural range

= Fraxinus dipetala =

Species of ash

Fraxinus dipetala, the California ash or two-petal ash, is a species of ash native to southwestern North America in the United States in northwestern Arizona, California, southern Nevada, and Utah, and in Mexico in northern Baja California. It grows at altitudes of 100–1,300 m.

== Description ==
It is a deciduous shrub or small tree growing to 7 m (23 ft) tall. The stems are cylindric to four-angled in shape, with gray and smooth bark; buds are more or less glandular-puberulent. The leaves are compound, growing 5–19 cm long by 5–11 cm wide from a 2.4–4.5 cm (0.9–1.8 in) petiole. The leaflets, numbering three to seven (rarely nine), grow 1–7 cm (0.4–2.8 in) long by 1–2.5 cm (0.4–1.0 in) wide. Leaflets are thin, ovate to more or less rounded, tapered at the base and obtuse to more or less rounded at the tip, with serrate-crenate margins; they are glabrous, dark green adaxially and pale abaxially.

The inflorescence grows 8–15 cm (3.1–5.9 in). The flower has a calyx with sepals measuring 1.2–2 mm (0.05–0.08 in), thin, with more or less toothed margins and green in color. The petals, numbering two and measuring 3.5–6.5 mm (0.14–0.26 in) by 1.3–3 mm (0.05–0.12 in), oblong-ovate or lobe-shaped, more or less cupped, narrowed and fused with filaments at the base, and cream-white in color. Unlike many ashes, they are bisexual, not dioecious. The stamens have anthers that measure 2.4–4.2 mm (0.09–0.17 in) and filaments measuring. The stigmas measure slightly less than the style. The flowers are sweetly scented, hanging in fluffy clusters.

The fruit is a long, flat samara, measuring 20–32 mm (0.79–1.26 in) long by 5–9 mm (0.20–0.35 in) wide, broadly oblanceolate and flat in shape, and broadly winged to near the base, green when immature and hanging in bunches.

== Distribution and habitat ==
Fraxinus dipetala grows in canyons and slopes in chaparrals, foothill woodlands, and oak-pine woodlands in elevations of 100–1,300 m (330–4,270 ft).

== Ecology ==
F. dipetala flowers from March or April to June.
