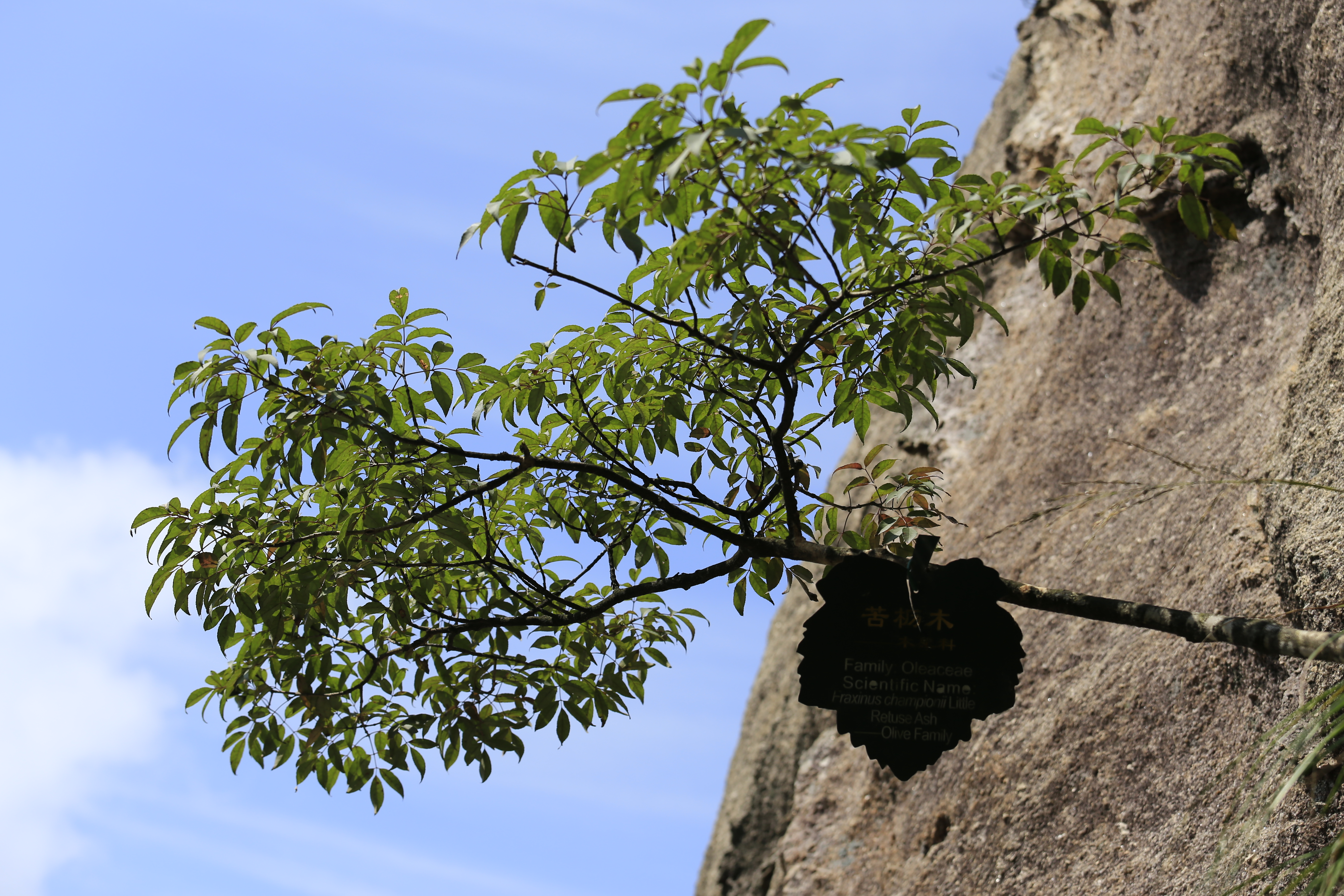
- Growing from a cliff. Note nameplate, which calls it retuse ash.
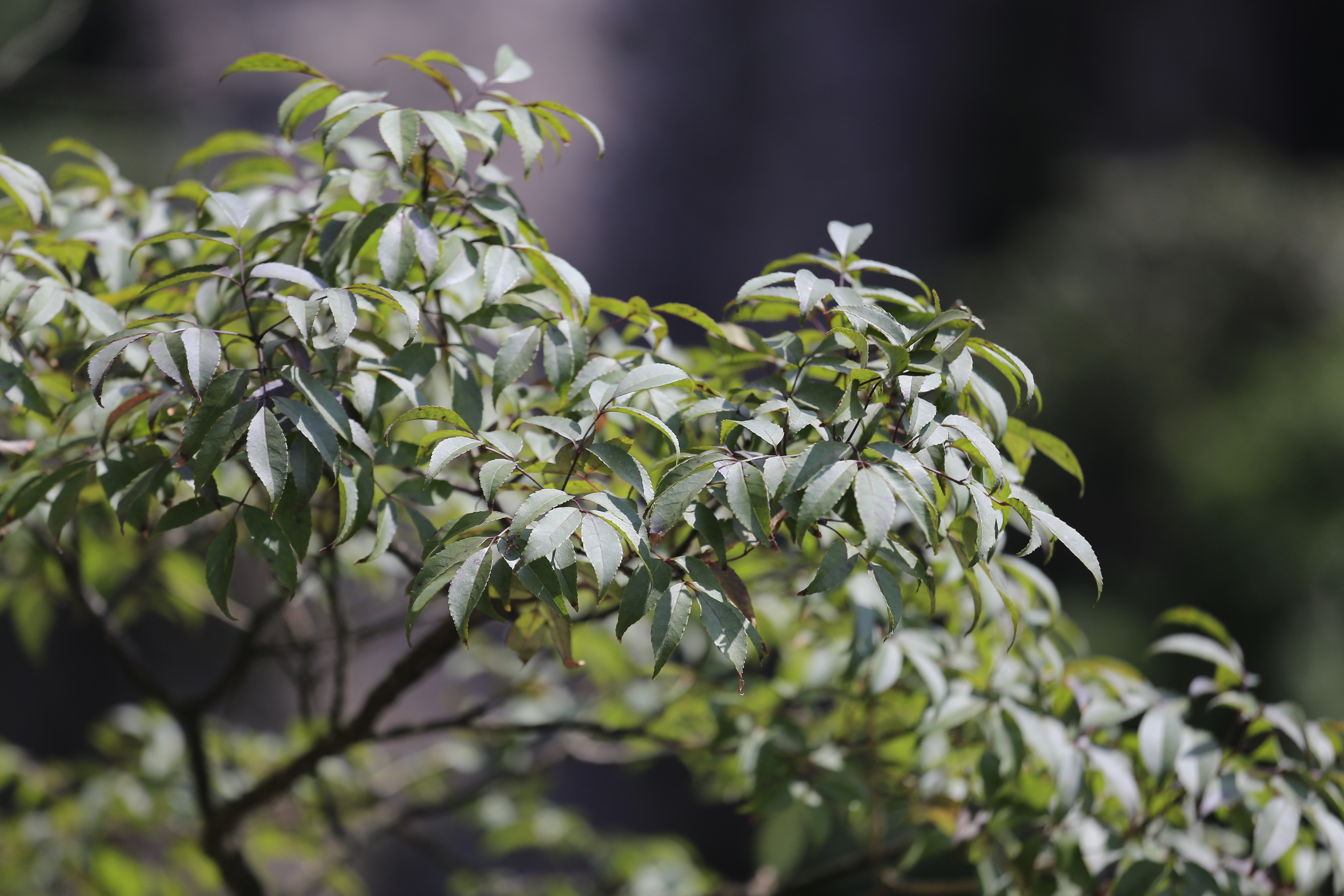
- Foliage

Conservation status
- Least Concern (IUCN 3.1)

Scientific classification
- Kingdom: Plantae
- Clade: Embryophytes
- Clade: Tracheophytes
- Clade: Spermatophytes
- Clade: Angiosperms
- Clade: Eudicots
- Clade: Asterids
- Order: Lamiales
- Family: Oleaceae
- Genus: Fraxinus
- Species: F. insularis

Binomial name
- Fraxinus insularis Hemsl.

Synonyms
- Fraxinus championii Little; Fraxinus floribunda subsp. insularis (Hemsl.) S.S.Sun; Fraxinus insularis var. henryana (Oliv.) Z.Wei; Fraxinus retusa Champ. ex Benth.; Fraxinus retusa var. integra Lingelsh.; Fraxinus taiwaniana Masam.

= Fraxinus insularis =

Species of flowering plant

Fraxinus insularis, the Chinese flowering ash or island ash, is a species of flowering plant in the family Oleaceae, native to central and southeastern China, Hainan, Taiwan, the Ryukyu Islands, and Yakushima, Japan. Its leaves produce a number of secoiridoid glucosides.
