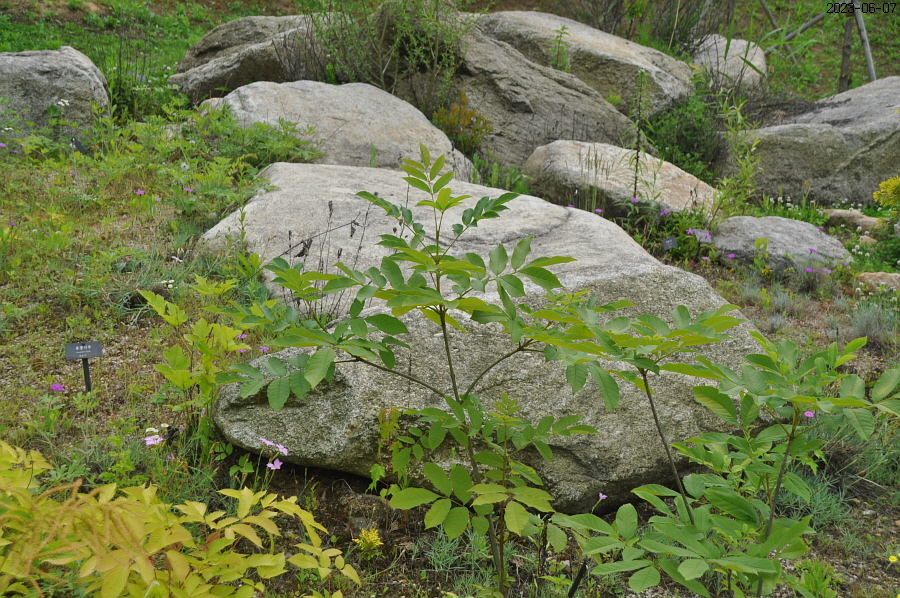

Conservation status
- Endangered (IUCN 3.1)

Scientific classification
- Kingdom: Plantae
- Clade: Embryophytes
- Clade: Tracheophytes
- Clade: Spermatophytes
- Clade: Angiosperms
- Clade: Eudicots
- Clade: Asterids
- Order: Lamiales
- Family: Oleaceae
- Genus: Fraxinus
- Species: F. chiisanensis

Binomial name
- Fraxinus chiisanensis Nakai

Synonyms
- Fraxinus chiisanensis var. stenophylla Nakai

= Fraxinus chiisanensis =

Species of flowering plant

Fraxinus chiisanensis, the Jirisan ash, is a species of flowering plant in the family Oleaceae, native to South Korea. With only about 20,000 mature trees found in nine locations, it is assessed as Endangered due to severe population fragmentation, and some logging pressure. In spite of its Endangered status, it is still dominant in those streamside mountain forests where it does occur.
