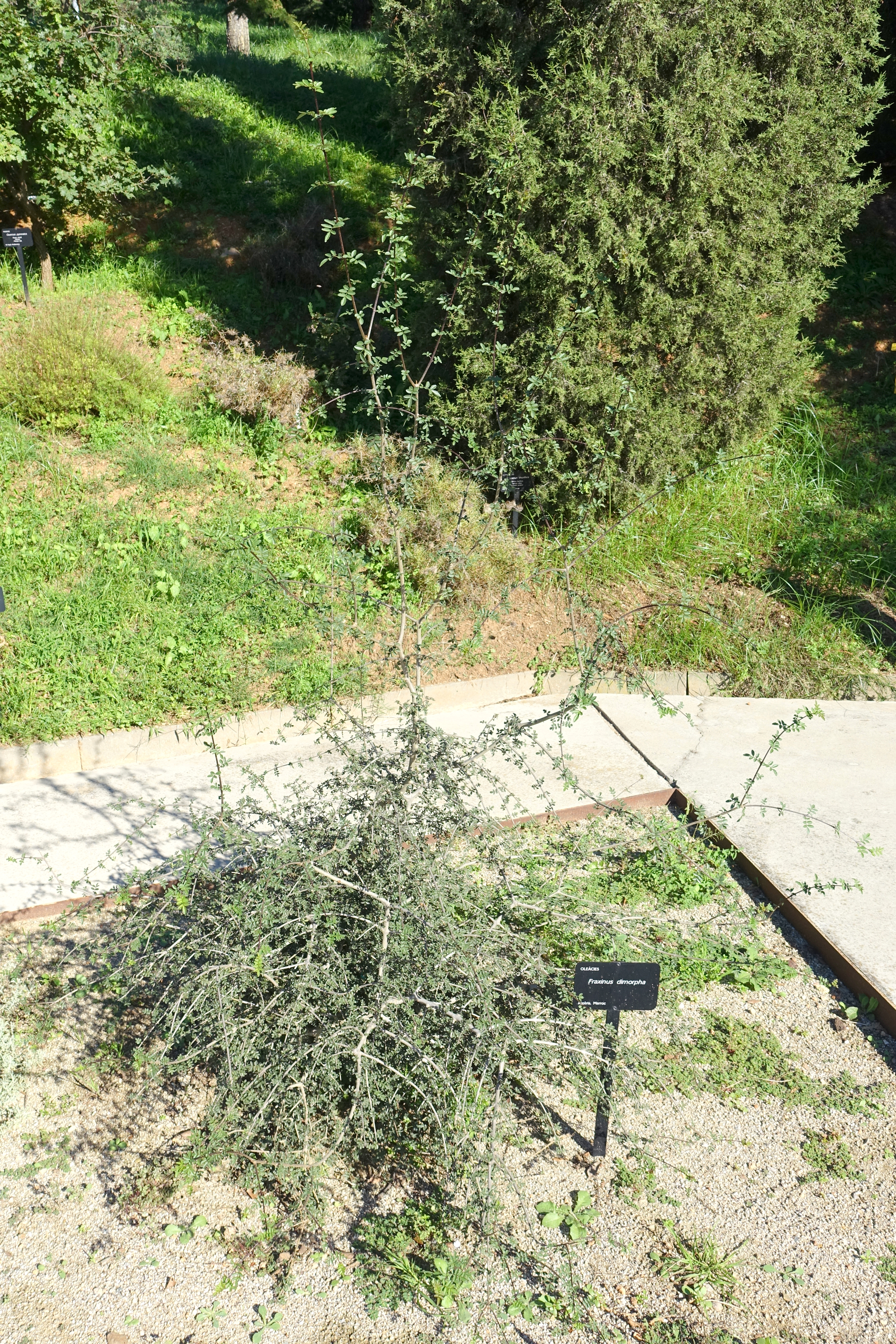

Conservation status
- Endangered (IUCN 3.1)

Scientific classification
- Kingdom: Plantae
- Clade: Tracheophytes
- Clade: Angiosperms
- Clade: Eudicots
- Clade: Asterids
- Order: Lamiales
- Family: Oleaceae
- Genus: Fraxinus
- Section: Fraxinus sect. Sciadanthus
- Species: F. dimorpha

Binomial name
- Fraxinus dimorpha Coss. & Durieu

Synonyms
- Homotypic Synonyms: Fraxinus xanthoxyloides var. dimorpha (Coss. & Durieu) Wenz.; Heterotypic Synonyms: Fraxinus dimorpha var. dumosa Carrière; Fraxinus xanthoxyloides var. dumosa (Carrière) Lingelsh.; Fraxinus xanthoxyloides f. dumosa (Carrière) Rehder

= Fraxinus dimorpha =

Species of ash tree

Fraxinus dimorpha is a species of flowering plant in the family Oleaceae. This ash tree is native to Morocco and Algeria in Northern Africa. An example occurrence of F. dimorpha is the Ourika River Valley, which is also the sole location within the High Atlas Range where the endangered primate Barbary macaque, Macaca sylvanus is known to occur, is the southernmost species of the genus in the world.
