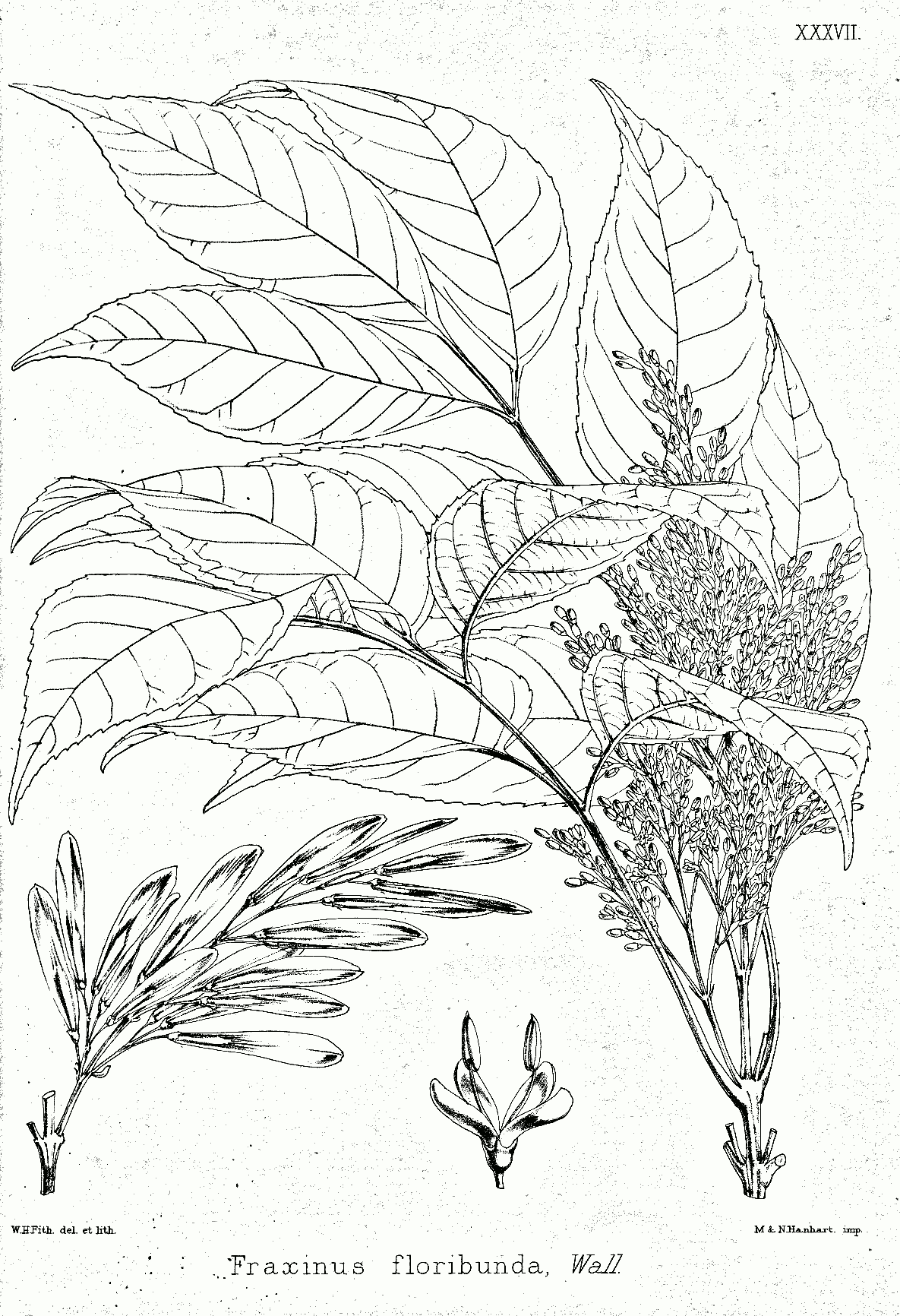

Conservation status
- Least Concern (IUCN 3.1)

Scientific classification
- Kingdom: Plantae
- Clade: Tracheophytes
- Clade: Angiosperms
- Clade: Eudicots
- Clade: Asterids
- Order: Lamiales
- Family: Oleaceae
- Genus: Fraxinus
- Section: Fraxinus sect. Ornus
- Species: F. floribunda

Binomial name
- Fraxinus floribunda Wall.

= Fraxinus floribunda =

Himalayan manna ash 多花梣 duo hua qin

Species of ash

Fraxinus floribunda is a species of ash native to South Asia, East Asia, and Southeast Asia. It is known from Afghanistan, Pakistan, Nepal, Assam, Bhutan, Laos, Myanmar (Burma), Thailand, Vietnam, the Ryukyu Islands, and parts of China (Guangdong, Guangxi, Guizhou, Xizang, Yunnan, Zhejiang).

Fraxinus floribunda is a medium-sized deciduous tree growing to 10–15 m tall with a trunk up to 50 cm diameter, with grey bark. Leaves opposite, pinnate, with 7–9 serrate leaflets. Flowers white, with petals 3–4 mm long, in large branched clusters up to 25 cm across. Fruit a nut, with a long narrow wing 2.5–4 cm long by 3–4 mm wide.
