= Ecco2k discography =

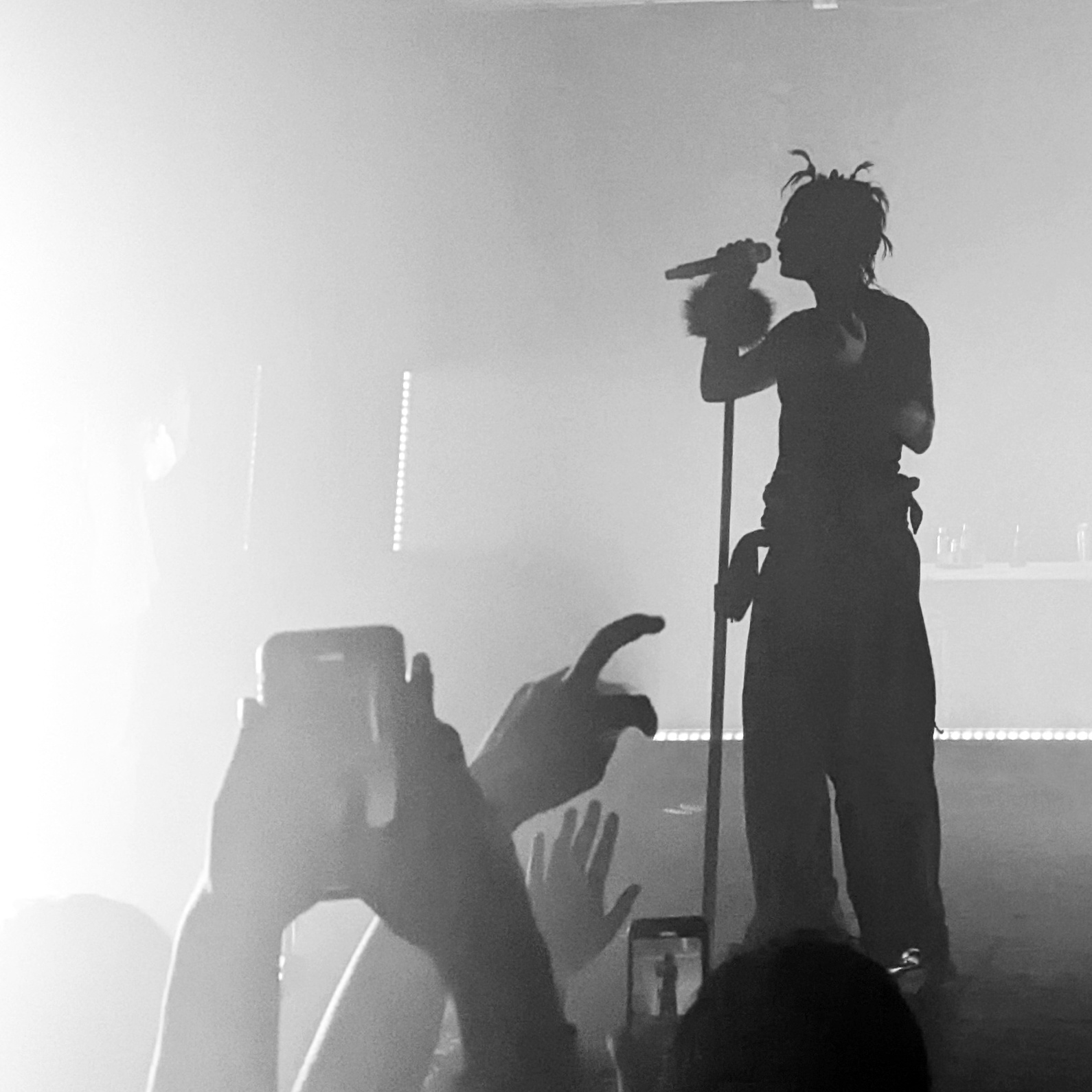
- Ecco2k performing with Drain Gang in 2022
- Studio albums: 2
- Collaborative albums: 3
- Extended plays: 3
- Singles: 24
- Music videos: 25

British-Swedish singer-songwriter and rapper Ecco2k has released two solo studio albums, three collaborative albums, 3 extended plays (EP), and numerous singles and music videos. Both albums E and Crest charted in Scotland and the United Kingdom.

== Studio albums ==
=== Solo albums ===
List of solo albums, with selected chart positions
Title	Album details	Peak chart positions			
Title	Album details	SCO	UK Record	UK Indie	UK Indie Break.
E	Released: 27 November 2019; Label: Year0001; Formats: CD, LP, digital download, streaming	95	22	36	14
Echo	Released: 12 November 2026; Label: 9th. (Ninth); Formats: CD, LP, digital download, streaming	—	—	—	—
"—" denotes a recording that did not chart.

=== Collaborative albums ===
List of collaborative albums, with selected chart positions
Title	Album details	Peak chart positions			
Title	Album details	UK Record	UK R&B	UK Indie	UK Indie Break.
D&G (with Bladee and Thaiboy Digital as Drain Gang)	Released: 7 August 2017; Label: Year0001; Formats: CD, LP, digital download, streaming	—	—	—	—
Trash Island (with Bladee and Thaiboy Digital as Drain Gang)	Released: 12 September 2019; Label: Year0001; Formats: CD, LP, digital download, streaming	—	—	—	—
Crest (with Bladee)	Released: 18 March 2022; Label: Year0001; Formats: CD, LP, digital download, streaming	25	12	40	17
"—" denotes a recording that did not chart.

== Extended plays ==
List of extended plays
Title	Album details
Crush Resist (CR_2015)	Released: 17 November 2017; Label: Self-released; Formats: Digital download, streaming
PXE	Released: 31 March 2021; Label: Year0001; Formats: CD, digital download, streaming
Cr₂ (Live)	Released: 31 October 2025; Label: 9th. (Ninth); Formats: Digital download, streaming

== Singles ==
=== As a lead artist ===
List of singles as a lead artist, showing year released and album name
Title	Year	Album	Ref
"Clear Eyes in My Eyes Freestyle"	2013	Non-album single	
"Bleach"	2013	Non-album single	
"Hold Me Down Like Gravity"	2013	Non-album single	
"I'm Alright"	2013	Non-album single	
"Mirage"	2014	Non-album single	
"BeautySleep"	2014	Non-album single	
"guardianAngels((NO2))"	2015	Non-album single	
"perfectCondition((GENUINE))"	2015	Non-album single	
"Antifreeze"	2015	Non-album single	
"S/o to My Stalkers"	2015	Non-album single	
"Dead Inside Dark Outside" (with Bladee)	2016	Non-album single	
"GT-R"	2017	D&G	
"Plastic Surgery" (with Bladee)	2017	Plastic Surgery	
"Black Boy"	2017	D&G	
"AAA Powerline"	2018	E	
"Fruit Bleed Juice"	2019	E	
"Girls Just Want to Have Fun" (with Bladee)	2020	Crest	
"Pollen"	2020	Non-album single	
"Amygdala" (with Bladee)	2022	Non-album single	
"9th (1st. 9th)"	2022	Non-album single	
"TL;DR" (with Bladee and Thaiboy Digital)	2024	Non-album single	
"Makka" (with Fakemink and Mechatok)	2025	Non-album single	
"Aldehydes and Ketones" (Note: Ecco2k released "Aldehydes and Ketones" as a single on 22 October 2026. On 3 November, Ecco2k released "Sky Burial" as a dual single with "Aldehydes and Ketones".)	2026	Echo	
"Sky Burial"	2026	Echo	

=== As a featured artist ===
List of singles as a featured artist, showing year released and album name
Title	Year	Album	Ref
"Snowmen" (Xavier Wulf featuring Bladee and Ecco2k)	2014		
"Visa" (Thaiboy Digital featuring Ecco2k and Bladee)	2015		
"Forget WYS" (Uli K featuring Ecco2k)	2016		
"Ça Va" (Nation featuring Ecco2k)	2023		
"Expression on Your Face" (Mechatok featuring Ecco2k and Bladee)	2025	Wide Awake	

== Music videos ==
=== As a lead artist ===
List of music videos as a lead artist
Title	Year	Director	Album	Ref
"Bleach"† (with Bladee)	2013	Rasmus Svensson	Non-album single	
"Hold Me Down Like Gravity"†	2013	Zak Arogundade	Non-album single	
"Mirage"	2014	Zak Arogundade	Non-album single	
"Perfectly Still [Gem Stone 1]"	2014	Zak Arogundade	Non-album single	
"†" indicates tracks stylized in all uppercase
