= Echo (Ecco2k album) =

Studio album by Ecco2k
- Released: 12 November 2026
- Recorded: 2019–2026
- Length: 35:57
- Label: 9th. (Ninth)
- Producers: Ecco2k; Gud; Whitearmor; Felix Lee; Mechatok

Ecco2k chronology
Crest (2022)	Echo (2026)

Singles from Echo
- 1. "Aldehydes and Ketones" Released: 22 October 2026; 2. "Sky Burial" Released: 3 November 2026

Echo is the second studio album by the British-Swedish musician Ecco2k. It was released by Ecco2k's own label, 9th. (Ninth), on 12 November 2026. Its tracks, as well as accompanying videos, were recorded across multiple cities between 2019 and 2026.

== Background and production ==
It’s been my whole life for the past six years. I think about it every day. It’s not an accident that my life is like this. It’s something that I’ve chosen. It was extremely gratifying, even though I didn’t enjoy every second of it.

— Ecco2k, 2026

Echo followed a 5-year hiatus of solo music from Ecco2k, during which other members of Drain Gang, including Bladee and Thaiboy Digital, continued to release music. Echo was Ecco2k's first solo work since his second extended play, PXE, released in 2021, and succeeded the collaborative album with Bladee, Crest, released in 2022. It additionally followed Ecco2k's debut album, E, seven years after its release in 2019. Dazed reported that in that time, the collective's fans speculated of Ecco2k's retirement from music. In an interview with Ecco2k, Kieran Press-Reynolds of Pitchfork said Ecco2k nevertheless remained a "cornerstone of Drain Gang since its birth in the early 2010s," so much so that its "ravenous fans" would ritualistically archive Ecco2k's social posts, treating them as "sacred missives" to "investigate every pixel... for possible intel." Ecco2k's covert public image was intentional, as reflected in lyrics in "Cuban Heel" ("Who wants to be a hero?" and "Some think I'm dead, that means it's working") which could, according to Dazed, "be read in view of Ecco2k’s repeatedly emphasised desire for privacy."

Against speculations of fans, Ecco2k had spent the period between 2019 and 2026 traveling extensively to locations around the world, where he recorded tracks and videos that eventually featured on Echo. Ecco2k expressed that the project was "the most difficult thing [he had] ever done." In an interview with Pitchfork, Ecco2k revealed that during that six-year period, he had visited 31 cities and locations across 18 countries in Africa, Europe, North America, Asia, and Oceania. (Note: Ecco2k's travels included visits to: Africa: Marrakesh, Morocco; North America: Los Angeles and New York state, United States; Europe: Stockholm and Vaimok, Sweden; Berlin and Oberwesel, Germany; London, Manchester, and Beachy Head, England; Athens and Poros, Greece; Tbilisi and Stepantsminda, Georgia; Calvi and Paris, France; Ibiza, Spain; Helsinki and Vuolteensalmi, Finland; Venice, Italy; and Istanbul, Turkey; Asia: Tokyo, Japan; Hong Kong, China; Ureshino, Japan; and Taipei, Taiwan; Oceania: Sydney, Australia; and Auckland and Waiheke Island, New Zealand)

== Release ==
The video and cover for "Aldehydes and Ketones" feature Echo standing behind the Kartlis Deda in Georgia

Ecco2k released the single "Aldehydes and Ketones", produced by longtime Sad Boys collaborator Gud on 22 October 2026. The song was accompanied by a self-directed, "dystopian" music video, filmed across twelve countries over six years, (Note: Primary camera work was conducted by Cheuk Ng, with additional camera work by Zak Arogundade, Nico de Torres, Madeleine Gaterud, Vivian Hu, Jonas Rönnberg, Benjamin Reichwald, and Tommy Malekoff.) in which Echo explores industrial, urban, and partially constructed environments (Note: Sites Arogundade featured in the "Aldehydes and Ketones" music video include the planespotting beach adjacent to the Sydney Airport in Australia; Tbilisi, Georgia—including behind the Kartlis Deda ("Mother of Georgia") monument, and at the intersection of Abastumani Street and Tevdore Mghvdeli Street; Hong Kong—including views of the Bank of China Building, Obelisk Hill on the Dragon's Back hiking trail, and the Chai Wan Industrial Park; Morocco—including the town of M'hamid in southern Marrakesh and the Ourika Valley near the Atlas Mountains; the Stronelairg windfarm in Fort Augustus, Scotland; and the Tokyo Metropolitan Government Building's observation desk in Shibuya, Tokyo, Japan.)—which according to a press release were "engulfed by the natural and manmade sublime." Upon its release, Wonderland and Kayla Sandiford of The Line of Best Fit called it a new "chapter" for Ecco2k, visually and musically. Julian Telles of The Daily likened the track to "AAA Powerline" of E, adding that it brought back "Gud's familiar distorted atmospheric synths and a muted, thumping kick marking a rhythmic pulse," whose low-ends were, according to Benny Sun of Resident Advisor, accompanied by "ephemeral textures." Telles said Ecco2k's distorted vocals "sound[ed] as if they were passed through a tin can telephone," whose lyrics were "cryptic" and "centered on an imaginary 'border' by which an unnamed person attempts to smuggle water".

Nearly two weeks later, on 3 November, Ecco2k released a second single "Sky Burial," produced by longtime Drain Gang collaborator Whitearmor and accompanied by another self-directed music video. (Note: Additional camera work was conducted by Zak Arogundade.) The track was illustrated by Ove Svensson of Popzine and Dennis Stromberg of Dopest as a "warmer, more euphoric counterpart," and by Dana Badii of The Needle Drop as a "direct response," to "Aldehydes and Ketones." The pairing was corroborated in a press release, which Stromberg, Svensson, and Kingsize added was more "pop-oriented." Adding onto Wonderland and Sandiford's comments on "Aldehydes and Ketones," Kingsize said the singles "form[ed] a new visual chapter in [Ecco2k]'s mixed media artistry, which continues to evolve." The video depicts Echo dancing in a field of tall grass obscured and bathed in a sunset-orange glow produced by the "halogen glare" of stadium lights. The maintained industrial visual language was interpreted as a continuation, yet contrasted response to the visual language of "Aldehydes and Ketones," offering what Northern Transmissions called a "more intimate" quality. Medicine Box said the song describes a "sky burial" in which "birds carry the dead upward." It argued the song was "for people who want to stop holding on without wanting to stop living," rejecting immortality for "freedom and wholeness."

Two days before the album's ultimate release, on 10 November, Ecco2k announced on social media that Echo was to be released on 12 November. A promotional video published to his Instagram revealed a set of four 7-inch vinyls bearing the letters E, C, H, and O on their covers—revealing the album's title.

== Narrative and style ==
The transcendent can express itself through the most ordinary things, and the sublime is so beautiful that it is frightening.

— Ecco2k, 2026

The album follows the story of its "vagabond" protagonist, Echo,—who had appeared as Ecco2k's alter ego in the video for PXE, in which the two met—travelling solitarily through industrial environments. Carrying a broadcast antenna and donning a crown of flowers, Echo travels "search[ing] for signals in a world of overwhelming beauty and indifference, listening and transmitting." The album is a coming-of-age story, whose subject matter reflects feelings of loneliness, longing, growing up, and retaining sensitivity in a hostile world.

Ecco2k produced the album's tracks and videos in tandem, which inspired moments in one another. Ecco2k described it as "a process of perceiving the sublime in the grander environment and finding one's place within that." Each of the album's tracks received an accompanying music video. Avyss and Shahzaib Hussain of Clash said Echo carried the visual line connecting Ecco2k's work, including the wind turbines from E and the electrical lines from PXE.

== Track listing ==
The album was executive produced and written by Ecco2k, with additional production and writing from Gud, Whitearmor, and Mechatok. Felix Lee also helped write two tracks, "French Exit" and "Loveless Animal, Lawless Criminal." (Note: Although Ecco2k is listed by streaming services as a producer on every track, the album's official website does not list him as a producer on tracks 1, 2, 6, and 12.)

Echo track listing
No.	Title	Writer(s)	Producer(s)	Length
1.	"Aldehydes and Ketones"	Carl-Mikael Berlander; Zak Arogundade	Ecco2k; Gud	4:02
2.	"Echo"	Carl-Mikael Berlander; Ludwig Rosenberg; Zak Arogundade	Ecco2k; Gud	3:17
3.	"Industrial Strength"	Zak Arogundade	Ecco2k	2:23
4.	"Fæmous Vagrant"	Zak Arogundade	Ecco2k	2:06
5.	"Plume"	Zak Arogundade	Ecco2k; Shanti	1:15
6.	"Cuban Heel"	Ludwig Rosenberg; Zak Arogundade	Whitearmor; Ecco2k	2:49
7.	"French Exit"	Carl-Mikael Berlander; Felix Lee; Zak Arogundade	Ecco2k; Gud; Whitearmor	4:09
8.	"Loveless Animal, Lawless Criminal"	Carl-Mikael Berlander; Ludwig Rosenberg; Zak Arogundade	Ecco2k; Gud; Whitearmor	4:02
9.	"Encore"	Zak Arogundade	Ecco2k	2:56
10.	"Held Overnight"	Zak Arogundade	Ecco2k	3:15
11.	"Swimming in Fountains"	Timur Tokdemir; Zak Arogundade	Ecco2k; Mechatok	2:15
12.	"Sky Burial"	Ludwig Rosenberg; Zak Arogundade	Whitearmor; Ecco2k	3:28
Total length:				35:57
