= Aldehydes and Ketones =

Single by Ecco2k

from the album Echo
- Released: 22 October 2026
- Recorded: 2021–2026
- Genre: Ambient, experimental, avant-garde, electronic
- Length: 4:02
- Label: 9th. (Ninth)
- Songwriters: Carl-Mikael Berlander; Zak Arogundade
- Producers: Ecco2k; Gud

Ecco2k singles chronology
"Makka" (2025)	"Aldehydes and Ketones" (2026)	"Sky Burial" (2026)

Music video
- "Aldehydes and Ketones" on YouTube

"Aldehydes and Ketones" is a song by British-Swedish musician Ecco2k. It was released as the lead single to his second studio album, Echo, on 22 October 2026, through his own label, 9th. (Ninth). A surprise release, it was written and produced by Ecco2k and longtime collaborator and Sad Boys member, Gud. The track was released alongside its music video, which Ecco2k directed, edited, and cinematographed. As part of Echo, which Ecco2k called his most ambitious project, "Aldehydes and Ketones" launched what many called a new chapter for Ecco2k.

The track and music video for "Aldehydes and Ketones" begins the story of Echo, whose title is the name of its vagabond protagonist. Carrying a broadcast antenna and donning a crown of flowers, the latter of which is seen in the single's cover art, Echo walks through industrial landscapes. It follows the album's coming-of-age story, whose subject matter reflects feelings of loneliness, longing, growing up, and retaining sensitivity in a hostile world. It received positive, yet mixed reviews from music critics.

== Background and production ==
Echo would follow a five-year hiatus of solo music from Ecco2k, during which he travelled extensively and uninterruptedly to locations around the world. In an interview with Pitchfork regarding Echo, Ecco2k revealed that during that six-year period, he had visited 31 cities and locations across 18 countries in Africa, Europe, North America, Asia, and Oceania. (Note: Ecco2k's travels included visits to: Africa: Marrakesh, Morocco; North America: Los Angeles and New York state, United States; Europe: Stockholm and Vaimok, Sweden; Berlin and Oberwesel, Germany; London, Manchester, and Beachy Head, England; Athens and Poros, Greece; Tbilisi and Stepantsminda, Georgia; Calvi and Paris, France; Ibiza, Spain; Helsinki and Vuolteensalmi, Finland; Venice, Italy; and Istanbul, Turkey; Asia: Tokyo, Japan; Hong Kong, China; Ureshino, Japan; and Taipei, Taiwan; Oceania: Sydney, Australia; and Auckland and Waiheke Island, New Zealand) "Aldehydes and Ketones" was specifically recorded and filmed between 2021 and 2026, during which Ecco2k visited twelve countries. Ecco2k collected approximately 30 hours of footage during the five-year period which would later be compiled into the four minute, two second music video. The break was ascribed by ArtistRack as Ecco2k "never [having] been one to follow standard release schedules or conventional industry playbooks."

== Composition and style ==
Julian Telles of The Daily likened the track to "AAA Powerline" of Ecco2k's debut album, E, adding that it brought back "Gud's familiar distorted atmospheric synths and a muted, thumping kick marking a rhythmic pulse," whose low-ends were, according to Benny Sun of Resident Advisor, accompanied by "ephemeral textures." Telles said Ecco2k's distorted vocals "sound[ed] as if they were passed through a tin can telephone," whose lyrics were "cryptic" and "centered on an imaginary 'border' by which an unnamed person attempts to smuggle water". ArtistRack said the track's naming, literally being aldehyde and ketones, which "are carbonyl-containing compounds defined by how easily they react, transform, and vaporize into distinct aromas," echo the track's sonical qualities. They argued the comparison between chemical relationships reflect "those exact physical properties inside the DAW." Atmospheric noise and the "achor[ing]" sub-bass represent a volatile base, the pitch-shifted falsetto "drift[ing] across the stereo field" represent a "vaporous" reactive layer, and the "ambient" industrial percussion represent a catalyst. In an interview with Kieran Press-Reynolds of Pitchfork, Ecco2k also referenced the chemicals, saying that "if the track 'had a smell, it would smell like a ketone or an aldehyde'—a reference to the pungent organic compounds often used in perfume."

Echo, who serves as the album's protagonist, is pictured by the Kartlis Deda in Georgia in the video and cover for "Aldehydes and Ketones"

The song was accompanied by a self-directed, "dystopian" music video, in which Echo explores industrial, urban, and partially constructed environments—which according to a press release were "engulfed by the natural and manmade sublime." Sabrina Amoriello of The Concert Chronicles said the video reflected the "passage of time" between Ecco2k's travels. Amoriello said "following Echo beneath vast skies and through environments where the beauty of the earth presses against the imposing structures built upon it" had an "unsettling" and "immersive quality." Amoriello and Imprint argued that the "outward gaze" presented in "Aldehydes and Ketones" contrasted the "introspective coming-of-age self-portrait" in E and the "possibility of transcending personhood" in PXE.

Sites Arogundade featured in the "Aldehydes and Ketones" music video include the planespotting beach adjacent to the Sydney Airport in Australia, where an Airbus A380-800 is seen taxiing; Tbilisi, Georgia—including behind the Kartlis Deda ("Mother of Georgia") monument, and at the intersection of Abastumani Street and Tevdore Mghvdeli Street; Hong Kong—including views of the Bank of China Building, Obelisk Hill on the Dragon's Back hiking trail, and the Chai Wan Industrial Park; Morocco—including the town of M'hamid in southern Marrakesh and the Ourika Valley near the Atlas Mountains; the Stronelairg windfarm in Fort Augustus, Scotland; and the Tokyo Metropolitan Government Building's observation desk in Shibuya, Tokyo, Japan.

== Release and reception ==
Ecco2k released the single "Aldehydes and Ketones," produced by longtime Sad Boys collaborator Gud on 22 October 2026. Wonderland and Kayla Sandiford of The Line of Best Fit called it a new "chapter" for Ecco2k, visually and musically. ArtistRack said "Aldehydes and Ketones" felt "like a crucial inflection point: a track that grounds Ecco2k’s floating vocal style in something heavier, darker, and far more visceral"—which they argue "swings the pendulum back" towards "solitary, brooding exploration" against Draing Gang's "bright, euphoric, and almost devotional pop music" direction.

Solomon PM of Dazed named the single the third best track on Echo, complimenting it as the "most memorable" of the album's interludes. He argued that the song was "in many ways acts as a microcosm of the project, introducing its immersive, electronic trip-hop sonic palette," before adding that "the moment when those plodding kicks drop in halfway through just feels so satisfying." Shortly after the single's release, Anthony Fantano of The Needle Drop said it had a "really great, eerie tension going on throughout," but didn't "[build] up [to much] of anything." Over a week later, Brandon Cortez of The Needle Drop said he was "on the fence with" the "abstract" track. Acknowledging that it "could make much more sense in the context of an entire record" and despite "hav[ing] a lot of atmosphere," Cortez argued the single was "vocally" not "as compelling as [his] favorite Ecco2k material that we've heard in the past," most notably collaborations with fellow Drain Gang member Bladee. Olivier Lafontant of Pitchfork rejected that the track was purely instrumental, considering Ecco2k's "unusually muted" presence—rather being "tingly," whose "prismatic melodies refract over martial drums" creating an "ambiance [that] is vaguely tense and unnerving." He added that "near the end [of the track], as the submerged tendrils of his vocals dissipate into vapor, the plumes of static undergirding the music are all that’s left," which Lafontant likened to the sound of "shuffling through snow in the dead of night"—a "small fear" he felt was "mundane in the grand scheme of things, but cogent in the context of this record."

== Credits and personnel ==
Credits adapted from Tidal, Ecco2k's official website for Echo, and the music video for "Aldehydes and Ketones."

=== Musical track ===
- Ecco2k – vocals, performance, production
- Gud – instrumental writing, production

=== Music video ===
- Zak Arogundade – director, editor, director of photography, C-camera
- Cheuk Ng – assistant camera, B-camera
- Nico de Torres – C-camera
- Madeleine Gaterud – C-camera
- Vivian Hu – C-camera
- Jonas Rönnberg – C-camera
- Benjamin Reichwald – C-camera
- Tommy Malekoff – C-camera
