= Teen Week =

- Standard cover

EP by Jane Remover
- Released: February 26, 2021
- Studio: Remover's bedroom (New Jersey)
- Genres: Digicore; progressive pop
- Length: 24:52
- Label: Self-released
- Producer: Jane Remover

Jane Remover chronology
Teen Week (2021)	Dariacore (2021)

Singles from Teen Week
- 1. "Woodside Gardens 16 December 2012" Released: December 16, 2020; 2. "52 Blue Mondays" Released: January 21, 2021

Teen Week is the debut extended play (EP) by the American musician Jane Remover. It was self-released under their former name Dltzk on February 26, 2021, before they changed their stage name in 2022. Remover wrote songs for the EP while in school and at home and produced the EP while they were applying to colleges. Teen Week is a digicore and progressive pop EP inspired by the electronica and electronic dance music of the musician Porter Robinson; some tracks feature 16-bit or 8-bit music and the Amen break. Its lyricism pertains to personal growth struggles, as well as themes of adolescence. After voicing their frustrations with the EP, Remover released an abridged version in 2022.

Teen Week was preceded by two singles—"Woodside Gardens 16 December 2012" and "52 Blue Mondays"—in 2020 and 2021, respectively. The EP received critical praise upon release, with laut.de ranking it among the best EPs of the year and Pitchfork considering it one of the best progressive pop albums of the year. The EP has later been recognized as a milestone in digicore by audiences and a pioneering release in the genre by publications. The Line of Best Fit deemed it one of the best hyperpop releases of all time, while Paste deemed it one of the greatest EPs of all time.

== Background and release ==
In early 2020, the American musician Jane Remover started to create digicore music and released an extended play (EP), No Words, Just a Picture of Me, in July 2020, under the alias High Zoey. They began working on their debut EP under the Dltzk name, Teen Week, saying they wrote most songs "either in the middle of class or in my bed at 3 in the morning". They recorded the EP in their bedroom in New Jersey. They had to wait before their parents left the house to record their vocals, so the songs for the EP would be produced before recording for them. The majority of the song "52 Blue Mondays" was pre-recorded in July 2020, before a completed version of the song was finished, and later thought of an idea to create a new version of the song. The album was produced during a time when Remover was applying to colleges and their grades depleted over the course of its production. They describe the EP's title as a "phrase that represents going down the wrong path in life and not having much control about it". In an interview with Lyrical Lemonade, they expressed hope that the EP would be their "big break" and they "just want people to know who [they are]."

On December 16, 2020, Remover released "Woodside Gardens 16 December 2012", a single for Teen Week. It was followed by another single, "52 Blue Mondays", on January 21, 2021. The EP was self-released on February 26, 2021, under their former name Dltzk, before they changed their stage name to Jane Remover in 2022. A day before its release, the EP was leaked. After its release, Remover's school counselor called them into her room after one of Remover's classmates reported their song "52 Blue Mondays" due to the lyric "I feel like dying every season"; the counselor wanted to check if Remover was all right. In an interview with Pitchfork in January 2022, Remover said they would rate the EP "a 4 or a 5 out of 10", and they could no longer listen to some songs from the EP. After announcing their transition and new name, they expressed their disapproval of Teen Week and mentioned they would release an abridged version. The abridged version was later released, consisting of four songs compared to the original eight.

== Composition ==
Teen Week is a digicore and progressive pop EP inspired by the electronica and electronic dance music of the musician Porter Robinson. It incorporates popular underground production elements, including bitcrushed and robotic vocals, breakbeats, breakcore sequences, and stuttering electronic instrumentals. Its production also contains jungle beats and an Avril Lavigne sample. The EP is largely about leaving behind people, past places, and previous versions of oneself, as well as themes of adolescence. Some moments of the EP depart from breakbeats for 16-bit sounds and lyrics about high school struggles, such as self-comparison and quarantine isolation. Multiple tracks contain the Amen break and sample "Blue Eyes", a song by Ecco2k from his album E (2019).

"52 Blue Mondays"
"52 Blue Mondays" features multiple sound elements, such as samples of screaming, synthesizer waves, and snapping drums. It also showcases Remover's robotic vocals that are shown across Teen Week.

Teen Week's opening track, "Let Down", is emotional in its content and draws inspiration from Ecco2k. It is followed by "Homeswitcher", a hyperpop song with guest vocals from Kmoe. The song is driven by a synthesizer lead that carries the song's melodies and is accompanied by breakbeat drums and fuzzy bass. A digicore song, "52 Blue Mondays" features multiple sound elements, such as samples of screaming, synthesizer waves, and snapping drums. With its bitcrushed vocals, the song features ambient-sounding noise, utilizes the Amen break, and dissolves by the end. "Dysphoria" is also inspired by Ecco2k and showcases Remover perform monotone singing of vulnerable lyrics. It is followed by "Cartridge", a ballad about being upset after reading a tweet that reminds Remover of their father. They sing the line "Sorry I'm not what you wanted, I know you can't try again" repeatedly, over an 8 bit instrumental reminiscent of an older Pokémon video game. Pitchfork's Mano Sundaresan described the two-track run of "Beast Friend" and "Woodside Gardens 16 December 2012" as "electric". The latter's frenzied two-minute buildup climaxes with an Amen break, and Remover performs a scream in its second half. The final track, "Seventeen", begins with an opening line of "I hate everything 'cause everything hates me too". The song expresses themes of adolescence and was written about Remover's feelings of jealousy toward their friends, who are more popular musicians than themself, and being looked down on at school. Sundaresan wrote that the line "I wish I blew up like yesterday" is "less about material aspiration than it is about becoming".

== Reception and legacy ==
Professional ratings
Review scores
Source	Rating
laut.de	4/5 stars
Pitchfork	7.2/10

Upon its release, Teen Week received critical praise. In a positive review from Pitchfork, Sundaresan wrote that Remover "has a strong ear for motion" and each track "push[es] this genre further from its roots towards something more complex, more definitively of its own substance". He also wrote that "52 Blue Mondays" "tore through the digicore scene like a comet". Though, he felt the tracks "Let Down" and "Dysphoria" were "limp imitation[s]" of Ecco2k's sound. In a review for laut.de, Mirco Leier felt the "vulnerability and openness" (Note: This quote is a translation of the original text: "Verletzlichkeit und Offenheit") displayed on the EP separated it from other digicore releases. They (Note: Leier is genderfluid. This article uses they/them pronouns for consistency.) felt the variety of genres the EP pulls from creates a "fittingly enervating soundtrack for the teenage angst the underlies the project". (Note: This quote is a translation of the original text: "schafft einen angemessen aufreibenden Soundtrack für die Teenage Angst die dem Projekt zugrunde liegt.") They disliked the production on "Let Down" and said the EP "may still sound a bit rough around the edges", (Note: This quote is a translation of the original text: "mag noch etwas rough around the edges") but concluded by writing that it is one of the best digicore releases of the year. The EP was included in Pitchfork's list of the "Best Progressive Pop Music" of the year; Cat Zhang called it "an explosive ride through adolescence". The staff from laut.de considered it the seventh best EP of 2021; their writer said it "contributes to maintaining hyperpop's optimism". (Note: This quote is a translation of the original text: "Optimismus für Hyperpop aufrecht zu erhalten")

Following its release, Teen Week has been viewed as a milestone in digicore by audiences, and Zhang called it a "lodestar of SoundCloud's digicore scene". It was considered the 14th best hyperpop release of all time by The Line of Best Fit in 2022; Noah Simon said the EP was the first digicore release to set new standards and shape the sound of future projects in the genre. He lauded its ability to showcase the many key elements of the digicore sound, and felt Remover "perfected" them. He further stated, "It displayed the potential for what a digicore album could be. It was a full artistic statement, not just a loose assemblage of chaotic singles". In 2024, the staff from Paste deemed Teen Week the 37th best EP of all time. Leah Weinstein said that "every sound vies for your attention regardless of how many layers of bitcrushing it's been through". Music critic Kieran Press-Reynolds, writing for Business Insider called it Remover's "first major break". Jordan Darville from The Fader described it as "a watershed achievement" in hyperpop and digicore and felt it stands out for merging genres to express teenage angst.

== Track listing ==
All tracks are written and produced by Jane Remover.

Teen Week track listing
No.	Title	Length
1.	"Let Down"	3:09
2.	"Homeswitcher" (with Kmoe)	2:25
3.	"52 Blue Mondays"	3:21
4.	"Dysphoria"	3:00
5.	"Cartridge"	2:51
6.	"Beast Friend"	3:27
7.	"Woodside Gardens 16 December 2012"	2:39
8.	"Seventeen"	4:00
Total length:		24:52

Abridged version track listing
No.	Title	Length
1.	"Homeswitcher" (with Kmoe)	2:25
2.	"52 Blue Mondays"	3:21
3.	"Woodside Gardens 16 December 2012"	2:39
4.	"Seventeen"	4:00
Total length:		12:25

== Personnel ==
Credits adapted from SoundCloud.

- Jane Remover – songwriting, production, mixing
- Kmoe – additional production, feature ("Homeswitcher")
