= Anima (garden) =

Coordinates: 31°24′7″N 7°49′37″W

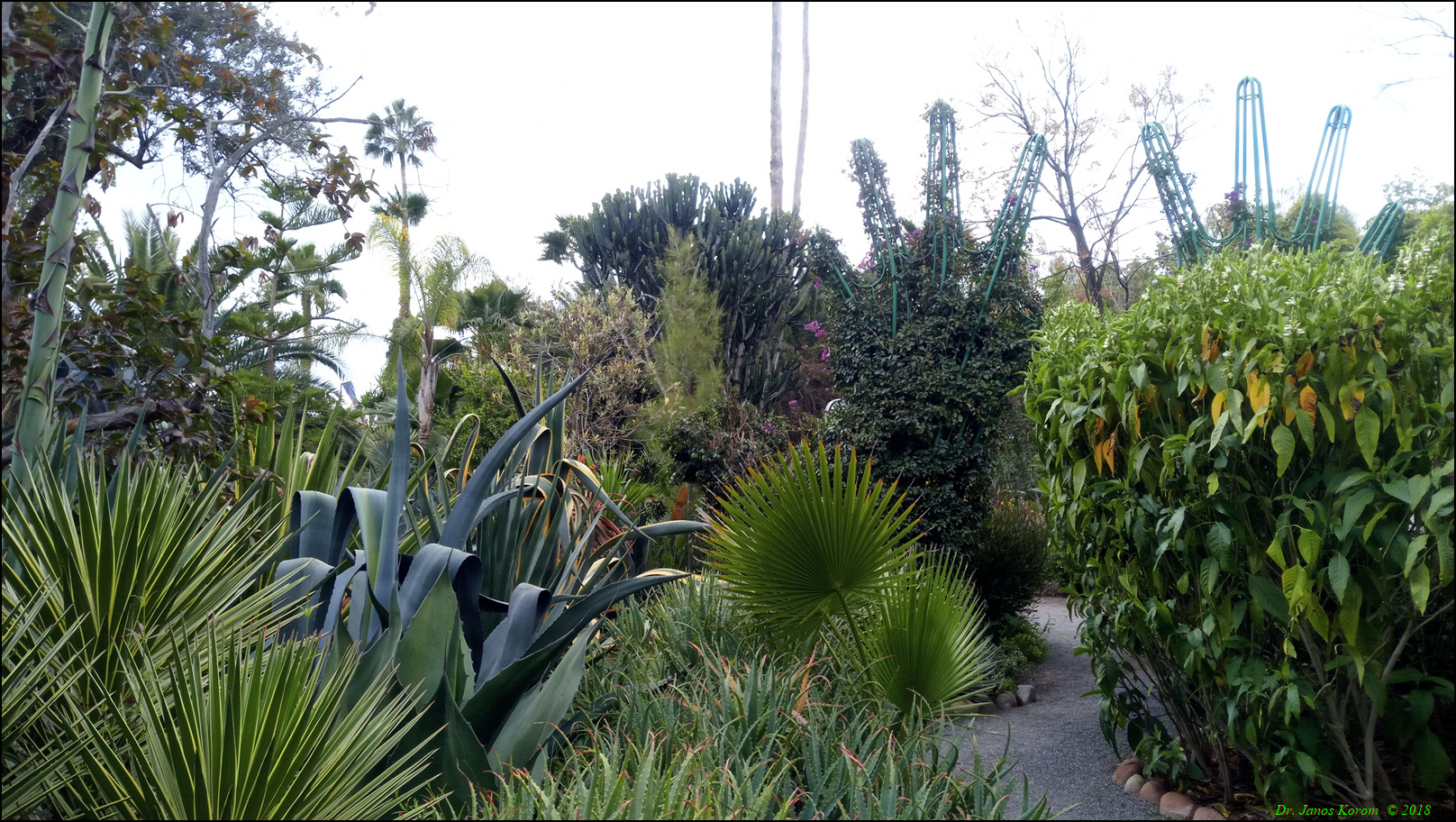
Nature in ANIMA (2018)

ANIMA (also known as the André Heller Garden or Anima Garden) is a botanical and sculpture garden in the Ourika Valley, near Marrakesh, Morocco. It was created by the Austrian artist André Heller and opened to the public in 2016. ANIMA combines botanical displays with sculptures and artworks by international artists, including Pablo Picasso and Keith Haring.

The garden was developed over a period of six years and covers an area of approximately three hectares. It was created on previously barren land at the foothills of the Atlas Mountains and is conceived as an artistic garden in which vegetation, sculpture, architecture and water features form an integrated environment.
