= Estimated sign =

Mark (℮) to declare approximate contents

℮o

Estimated sign
- In Unicode: U+212E ℮ ESTIMATED SYMBOL

Different from
- Different from: U+0065 e LATIN SMALL LETTER E

Estimated symbol specification

The estimated sign or estimated symbol, ℮ (officially, the ℮-mark or the final EC verification mark in EU law) can be found on most prepackaged products in the European Union (EU). Its use declares that the prepackage fulfils EU Directive 76/211/EEC, which specifies the maximum permitted tolerances in package content.

The shape and dimensions of the ℮-mark are defined in EU Directive 2009/34/EC. The ℮-mark is also used on prepackages in the United Kingdom, Australia and South Africa. It must be placed in the same field of vision as the nominal weight or volume quantity, for example, "1 mg ℮" or "1 L ℮".

== Functions ==
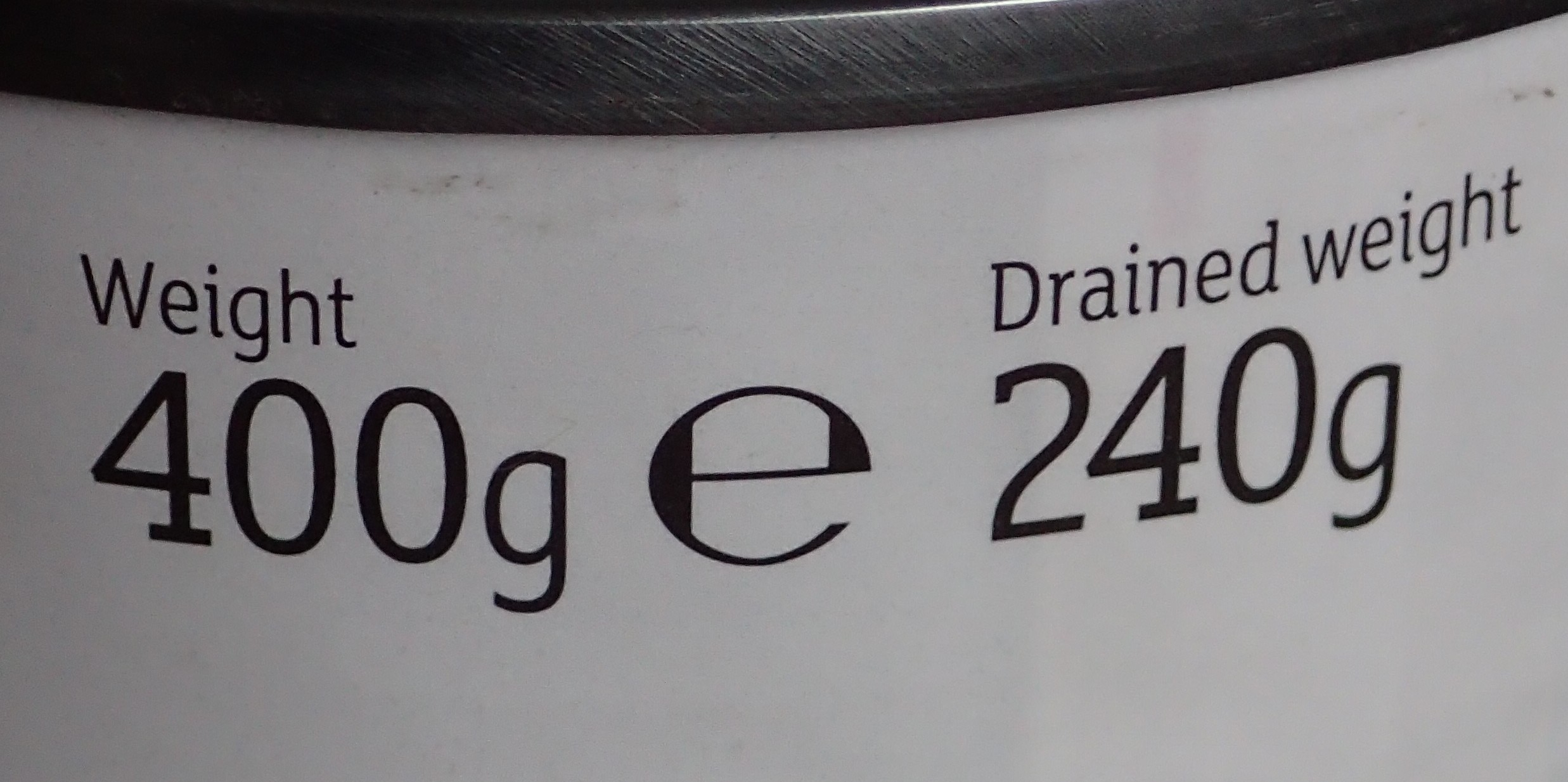
EU ℮-mark next to the weight of the contents of a can

Use of the estimated sign declares that:

- the average quantity of product in a batch of prepackages shall not be less than the nominal quantity stated on the label;
- the proportion of individual prepackages having a negative error greater than the tolerable negative error shall be sufficiently small for batches of prepackages to satisfy the requirements of the official reference test as specified in legislation;
- none of the prepackages marked have a negative error greater than twice the tolerable negative error (since no such prepackage may bear the sign).

The scope of the directive is limited to prepackages that have a predetermined nominal weight of between 5 g and 10 kg or volume of 5 mL and 10 L, are filled without the purchaser present, and in which the quantity cannot be altered without opening or destroying the packing material.

The sign looks like a stylised lowercase letter e and its shape is precisely defined by the European Union Directive 2009/34/EC. It must be placed in the same field of vision as the nominal quantity. The sign has been added to the Unicode list of characters as U+212E ℮ ESTIMATED SYMBOL.

== Tolerable negative error ==
Error tolerance decreases as nominal quantity increases, by alternating intervals of a given percentage error with intervals of a given amount error: these interpolate between the stepwise decreases in percentage error. The estimated sign indicates that the average quantity of product in a batch of prepackages is not less than the nominal quantity stated on the label.

The tolerable negative error is related to the nominal quantity and varies between 9% on prepackages nominally 50 g or 50 mL or less, to 1.5% on prepackages nominally 1 kg (or 1 L) or more. The tolerable error decreases as nominal quantity increases, and is done by alternating intervals where there is a percentage error and intervals where there is a fixed error (and thus over those intervals the percentage error decreases).

Calculated TNEs and the relevant weights
Pack nominal weight, in grams	(approximate imperial equivalent)	Tolerable negative error		Less TNE	Less 2×TNE
Pack nominal weight, in grams	(approximate imperial equivalent)	As %	As g, rounded to nearest 0.1g	most must weigh more than	none may less than
14	1/2 oz	9.00%	1.3	12.7	11.4
28	1 oz	9.00%	2.5	25.5	23
85	3 oz		4.5	80.5	76
113	4 oz ( 1/4 lb)	4.50%	5.1	107.9	102.8
142	5 oz	4.50%	6.4	135.6	129.2
170	6 oz	4.50%	7.7	162.3	154.6
199	7 oz	4.50%	9	190	181
227	8 oz ( 1/2 lb)		9	218	209
340	12 oz ( 3/4 lb)	3.00%	10.2	329.8	319.6
454	1 lb (16 oz)	3.00%	13.6	440.4	426.8
680	1 lb 8 oz (1 1/2 lb)		15	665	650
907	2 lb		15	892	877
1000	2.2 lb		15	985	970

Table of tolerable negative errors
Nominal quantity in g or mL	Tolerable negative error
5–50	9%
50–100	4.5 units
100–200	4.5%
200–300	9 units
300–500	3%
500–1000	15 units
1000–10000	1.5%

== See also ==
- CE marking (stylized)
- EC identification and health marks
- E (Ecco2k album)
