= Ourika River =

Ourika
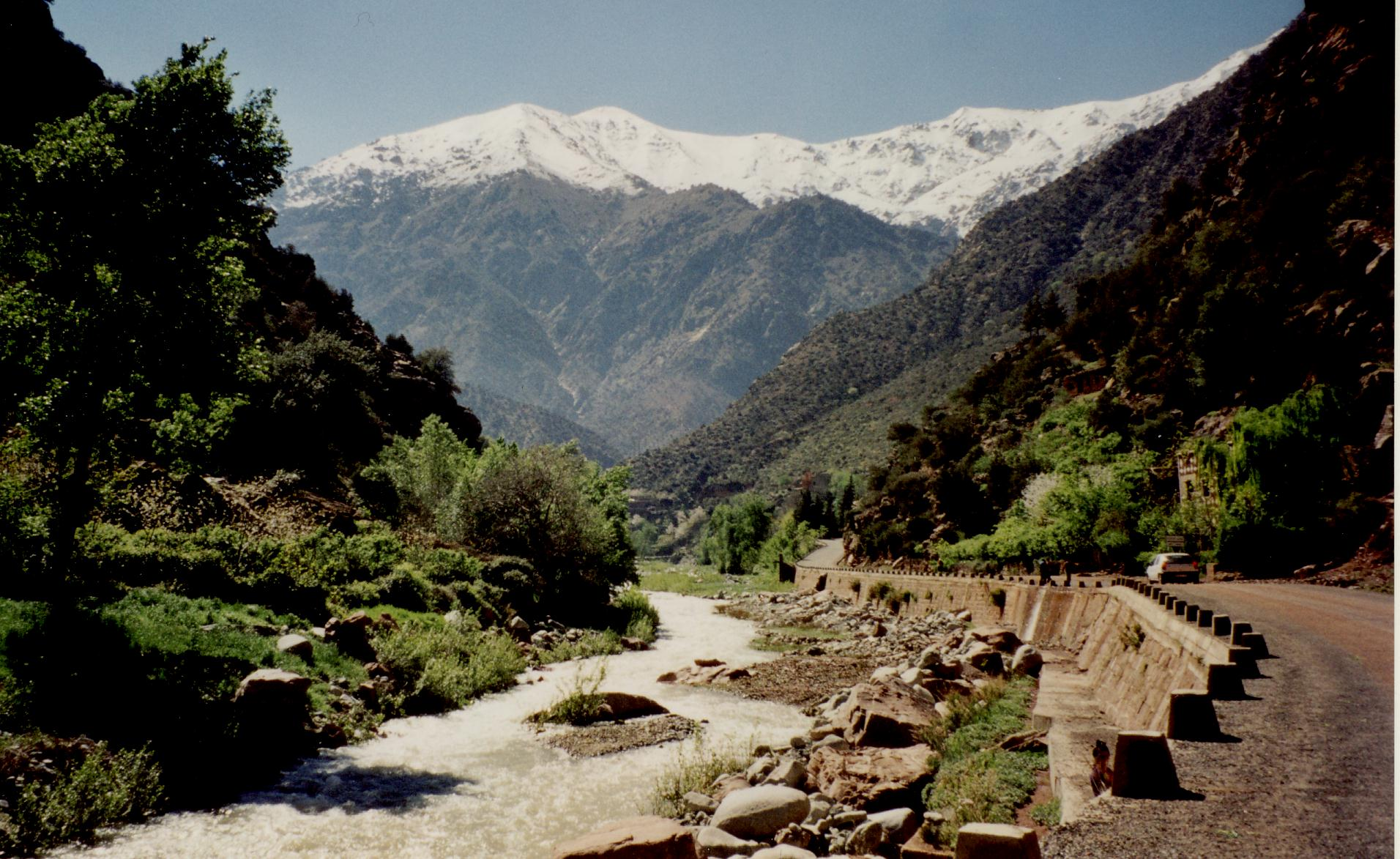

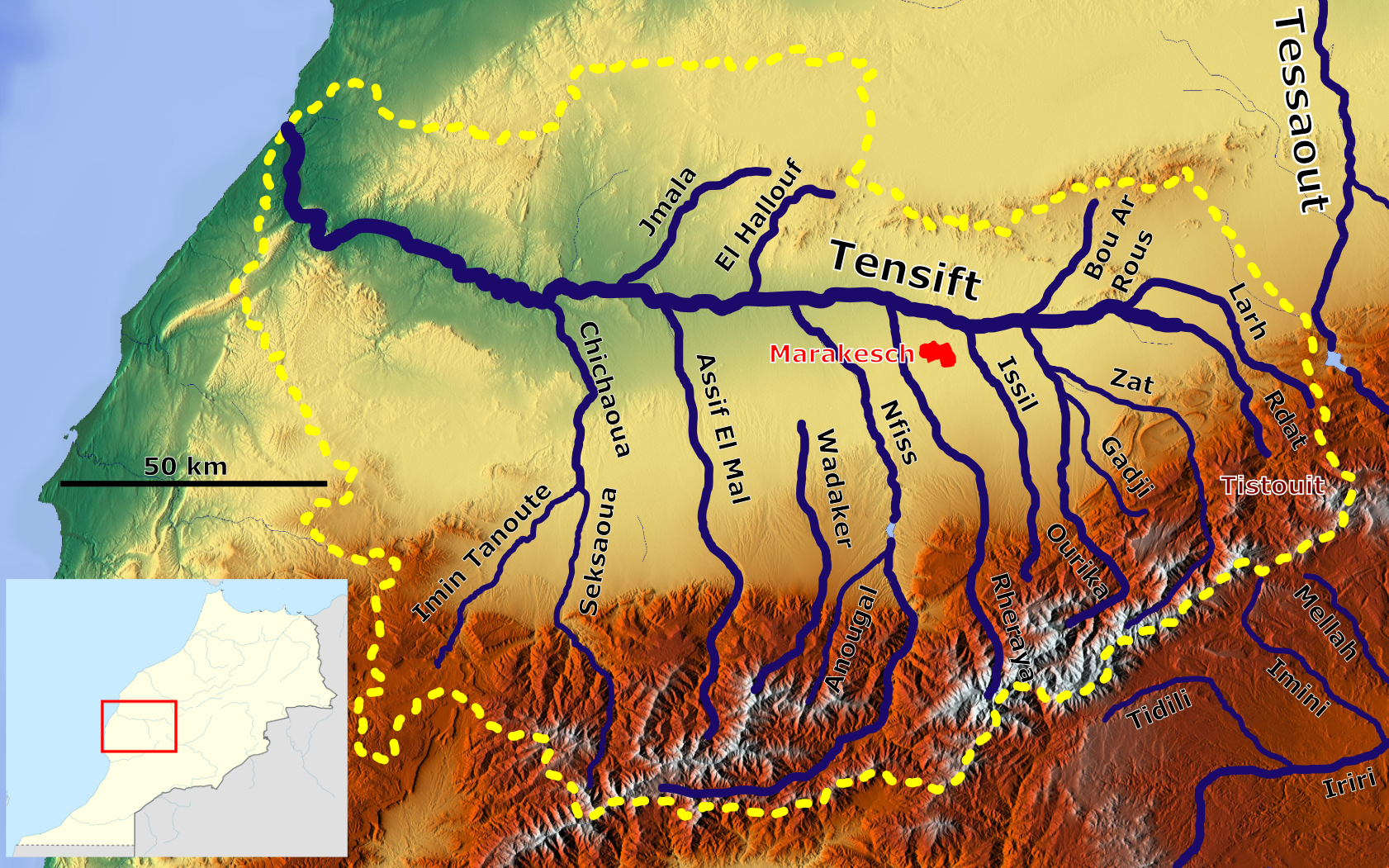
- The watershed of Oued Tensift with Oued Ourika (center right)
- Native name: Standard Moroccan Tamazight: ⴰⵙⵉⴼ ⵏ ⵓⵡⵔⵉⴽⵏ

Ourika River (Arabic: نهر أوريكا; Standard Moroccan Tamazight: ⴰⵙⵉⴼ ⵏ ⵓⵡⵔⵉⴽⵏ) is a river in Morocco, at 31.4°N 7.783333°W. It rises in the High Atlas and flows through the Ourika Valley, 30 km from Marrakesh.

== Natural history ==
A number of interesting plants have been recorded in this valley beginning in the late 19th century including Fraxinus dimorpha. This valley is the sole location within the High Atlas Range where the endangered primate Barbary macaque, Macaca sylvanus is known to occur; this primate is found in the Middle Atlas and a few disjunctive populations in Algeria and Gibraltar.

The region is inhabited by Berber people who practice a traditional way of life. Despite its proximity to Marrakesh, it is still considered relatively "unspoiled".

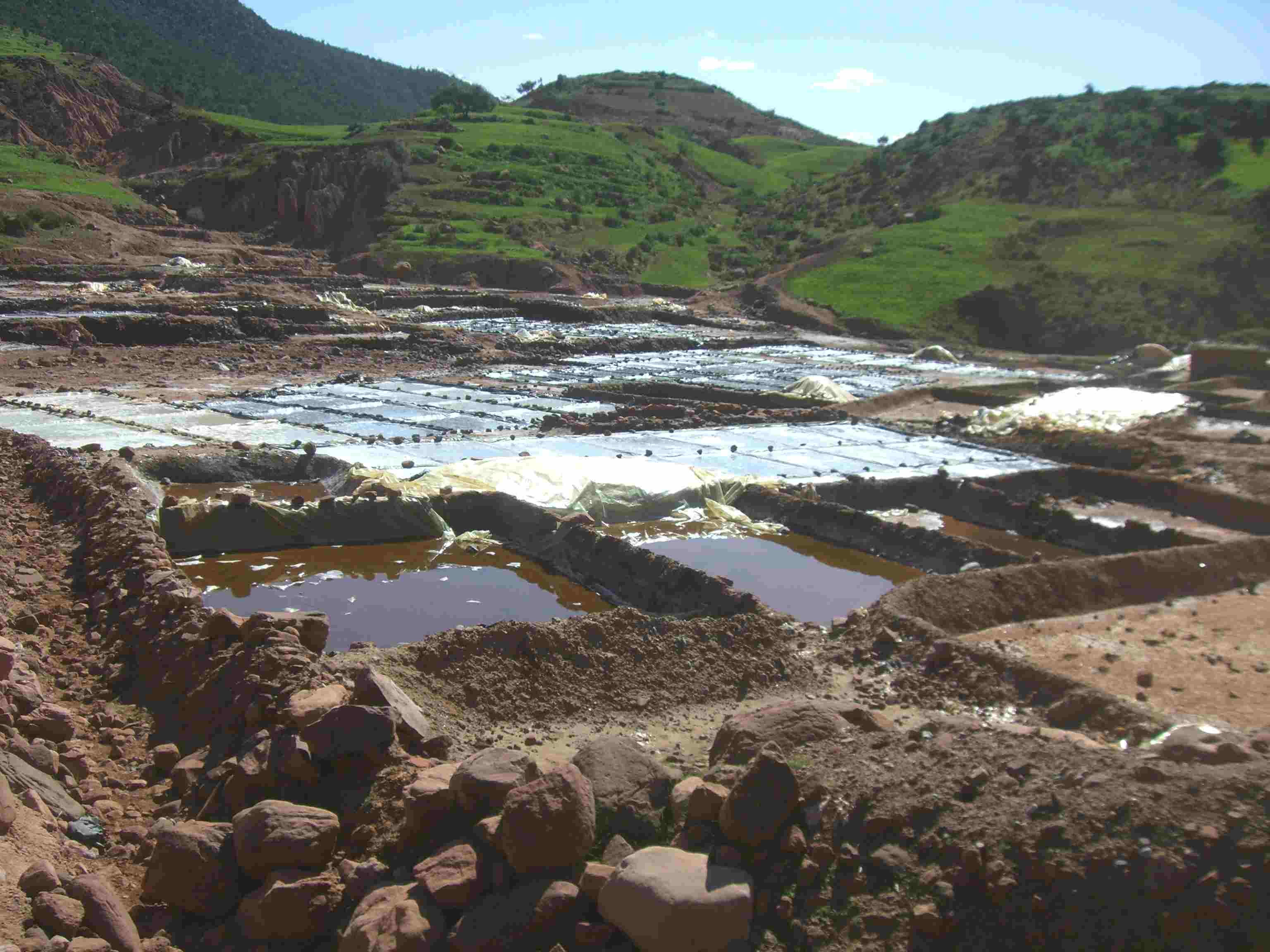
Salt production in Ourika Valley

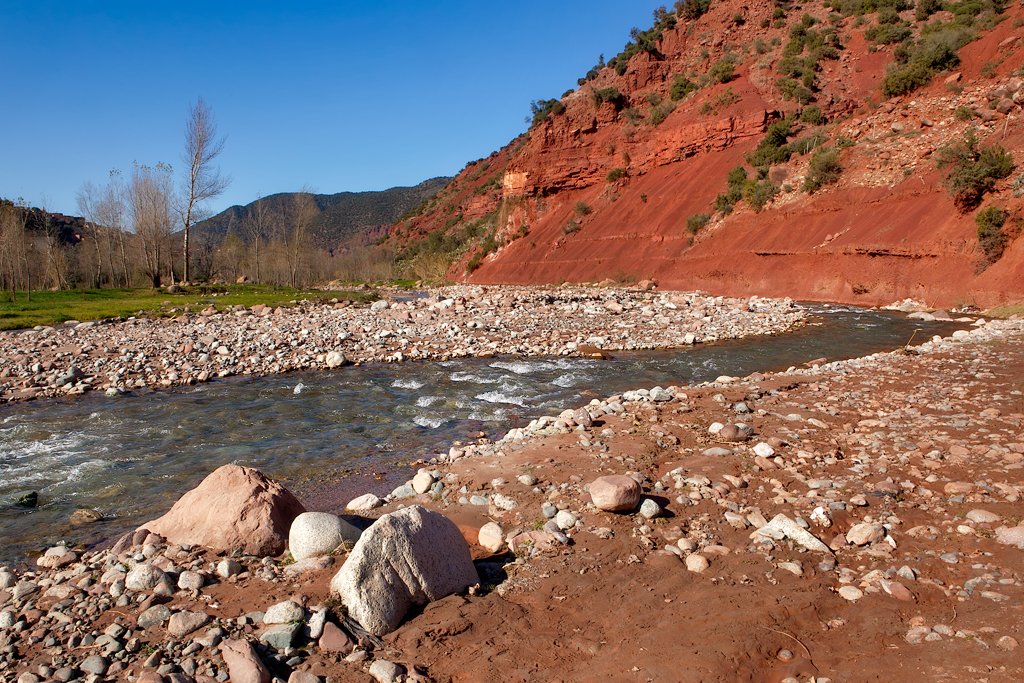
Ourika river itself

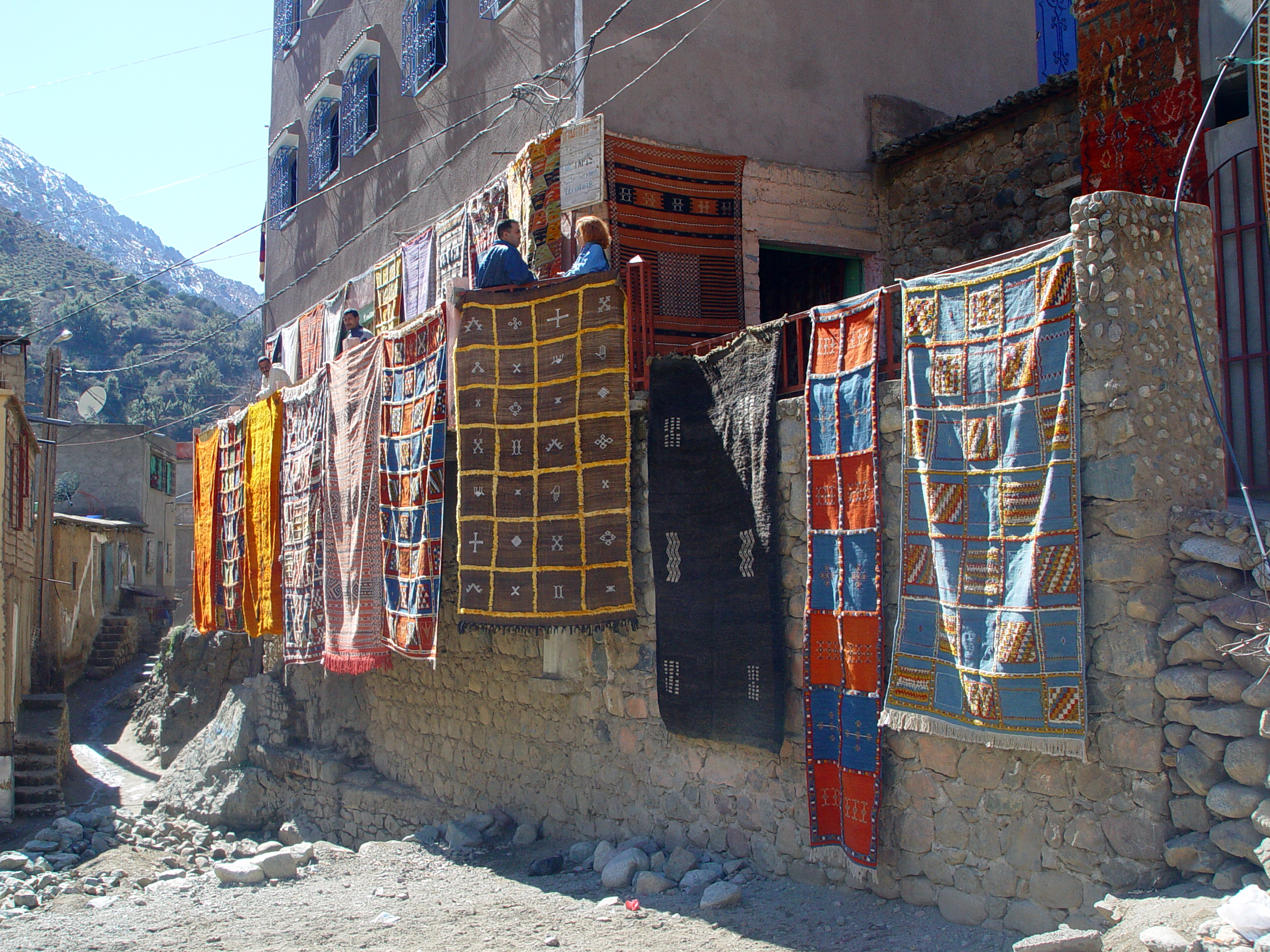
Drying carpets at a Berber village factory in Ourika Valley
