= Trash Island (album) =

Studio album by Drain Gang
- Released: 12 September 2019
- Genres: Cloud rap; pop
- Length: 22:04
- Label: Year0001
- Producers: Whitearmor; Mechatok; Lusi

Drain Gang chronology
| D&G (2017) | Trash Island (2019) |

Bladee chronology
| Icedancer (2018) | Trash Island (2019) | Exeter (2020) |

Ecco2k chronology
| D&G (2017) | Trash Island (2019) | E (2019) |

Thaiboy Digital chronology
| D&G (2017) | Trash Island (2019) | Legendary Member (2019) |

Trash Island is a collaborative studio album by the Swedish hip-hop collective Drain Gang, released on 12 September 2019 through Year0001. Performed by the collective's members Bladee, Ecco2k, and Thaiboy Digital, the album includes a guest appearance by frequent collaborator Yung Lean. A cloud rap and pop album, it was primarily produced by Drain Gang's producer Whitearmor, with contributions from Mechatok and Lusi. Compared to the lo-fi of Drain Gang's previous work, Trash Island has a more polished and melodic sound. It was recorded during a visit by Drain Gang to Bangkok, Thailand, after visa complications forced Thaiboy Digital to leave Sweden in 2015.

== Background and release ==
The Swedish hip hop collective Drain Gang formed in Stockholm in 2013. It consists of rappers Bladee, Ecco2k, and Thaiboy Digital, as well as producer Whitearmor. Through collaborations with fellow Swedish rapper Yung Lean, the group began to gain recognition, and released the project GTBSG that same year. In 2015, visa complications forced Thaiboy Digital to leave Sweden and move to Bangkok, Thailand. Drain Gang released their second album, D&G, in 2017.

Trash Island was recorded in Bangkok, when Drain Gang were visiting Thaiboy Digital. The album was primarily produced by Whitearmor, with contributions from producers Mechatok and Lusi. Its artwork was created by Ecco2k. Trash Island was released on 12 September 2019 through Year0001.

== Composition ==
Trash Island was described as cloud rap and "futuristic pop" by critics. Dazed magazine considered it a sonic shift from the lo-fi of Drain Gang's earlier work, to a more polished, melodic sound. Its opening track, "1:1", contains a guest appearance from fellow Swedish rapper and frequent Drain Gang collaborator Yung Lean. Bladee is absent from the track, with Ecco2k taking the lead, and Thaiboy Digital delivering a hook-like verse. The following two tracks see Thaiboy Digital taking the lead. On "30th Floor", he sings a duet with Bladee, and on "Waterfall", he sings the chorus. On Trash Island's fourth song, "Victim", Bladee repeats a minimalist hook, and Ecco2k delivers a verse about battling destructive urges. The song features an instrumental which The Fader's Raphael Helfand wrote "burrows sneakily into one’s brain and sticks around." The fifth song, "Western Union", is built around Ecco2k's hook. The following track, "The Void", features a sparse, atmospheric sound, with echoing vocals and kick drums. Led by Bladee, it contains dark, depressive, and introspective lyrics. By comparison, the final two tracks "Acid Rain" and "You Lose" show a more hopeful tone.

== Critical reception ==
Professional ratings
Review scores
| Source | Rating |
|---|---|
| RapReviews | 6.5/10 |

In a positive review, Steve Juon of RapReviews described Trash Island as "music designed for Instagram reels and TikTok videos." He praised the album's brevity, calling it a casual listening experience. Juon was impressed by the production by Whitearmor, and considered it the album's biggest strength. He felt indifferent toward the vocal performances, saying "the rappers involved have nothing terribly intriguing to say". Helfand named Trash Island Drain Gang's "tightest, most cohesive" group project. He described the song "Western Union" as "the perfect posse cut", and considered the album's final two tracks to be its weakest.

Trash Island was described as "iconic" by Sophie L Walker of The Line of Best Fit, who also described track "Victim" as a "classic". Keegan Brady of Rolling Stone described "Western Union" as a "widely beloved track". Helfand wrote in 2024 that the album "sparked the Drain Gang revolution".

== Track listing ==
All tracks produced by Whitearmor; "Acid Rain" and "You Lose" also produced by Mechatok and Lusi, respectively.

| No. | Title | Artists | Length |
|---|---|---|---|
| 1. | "1:1" (featuring Yung Lean) | Ecco2k; Thaiboy Digital | 3:16 |
| 2. | "30th Floor" | Thaiboy Digital; Bladee | 2:09 |
| 3. | "Waterfall" | Thaiboy Digital; Bladee; Ecco2k | 3:34 |
| 4. | "Victim" | Bladee; Thaiboy Digital; Ecco2k | 2:33 |
| 5. | "Western Union" | Ecco2k; Thaiboy Digital; Bladee | 2:00 |
| 6. | "The Void" | Bladee; Ecco2k; Thaiboy Digital | 3:31 |
| 7. | "Acid Rain" | Bladee; Ecco2k | 2:24 |
| 8. | "You Lose" | Ecco2k; Bladee; Thaiboy Digital | 2:37 |
| Total length: | | | 22:04 |
