= Eytys =

Swedish fashion brand

- Company type: Private company
- Industry: Fashion
- Founded: 2013
- Founders: Max Schiller, creative director Jonathan Hirschfeld, CEO
- Headquarters: Stockholm, Sweden
- Website: www.eytys.com

Eytys (stylized as EYTYS, and pronounced as "eighties") is a fashion brand based in Stockholm, Sweden. It was launched in 2013 by Max Schiller and Jonathan Hirschfeld as a unisex sneaker and footwear label. The brand later expanded its genderless direction with a line of jeans in 2017, and has since 2019 released full seasonal ready-to-wear collections.

== Collaborations ==
In 2016, Eytys released a limited-run sneaker together with Swedish rapper Yung Lean and artist collective Sad Boys.

Following its expansion into clothing, the brand released a joint collection with H&M in 2019 that offered both sneakers and ready-to-wear.

A capsule collection made with Japanese fashion designer Michiko Koshino was also released in 2019, featuring items inspired by 1990s rave culture.

The brand has also collaborated with editor and creative director Luis Venegas on his magazine EY! Magateen for its 2020 and 2021 publications, featuring local models and personalities from Israel and Australia.

During the early parts of his music career, British-Swedish singer and model Ecco2k also worked as a designer and in-house photo editor at the brand.
