= PXE (EP) =

EP by Ecco2k
- Released: 31 March 2021
- Genres: Pop; electronic; glitch; hip-hop
- Length: 10:12
- Label: Year0001
- Producer: Ecco2k

Ecco2k chronology
E (2019)	PXE (2021)	Crest (2022)

PXE is the second extended play by the British-Swedish rapper Ecco2k, released on 31 March 2021 by Year0001.

== Production and composition ==
A surprise album, PXE was accompanied by a video from artist and animator Freddy Carrasco, where Ecco2k meets up with an alter ego named Echo while hanging out on a transmission tower. The visuals were inspired by anime and the dialogue box from the Pokémon games. The album's title was taken from the idea of "pixie music". Unlike his previous album E, PXE was produced entirely by Ecco2k. It was the first project he finished upon returning to Sweden. Ecco2k said the album is "more about sincerity, being raw and unfiltered," adding "it's about being okay with the way that I am."

== Reception ==
Professional ratings
Review scores
Source	Rating
Pitchfork	7/10

In a 7/10 review for Pitchfork, Ben Dandridge-Lemco wrote that, "with glitchy stops and starts that attract and repel, PXE sounds like an exciting and exploratory new direction", and that the album is "a testament to Ecco2k's evolution as an all-around artist that it feels like there could be even more to say." The Fader staff considered "In the Flesh" the 96th best track of 2021.

== Track listing ==
All tracks are written by Zak Arogundade.

No.	Title	Length
1.	"PXE"	1:27
2.	"In the Flesh"	2:03
3.	"Jalouse"	2:12
4.	"No***'s Song"	1:30
5.	"Big Air"	3:00
Total length:		10:12

CD hidden track
No.	Title	Length
6.	"(Hidden Track)"	2:17
Total length:		12:29

== Personnel ==
- Zak Arogundade – production, mixing, art direction
- Robin Schmidt – mastering
- Freddy Carrasco – artwork
- Hendrik Schneider – photography
