= Ureshino =

Ureshino may refer to:

- Ureshino, Saga
- Ureshino, Mie
- Ureshino opening
- Ureshino-Onsen Station
- Akihiko Ureshino (born 1971), Japanese novelist
- 52260 Ureshino, as asteroid
