= Ecco2k =

British-Swedish rapper (born 1994)

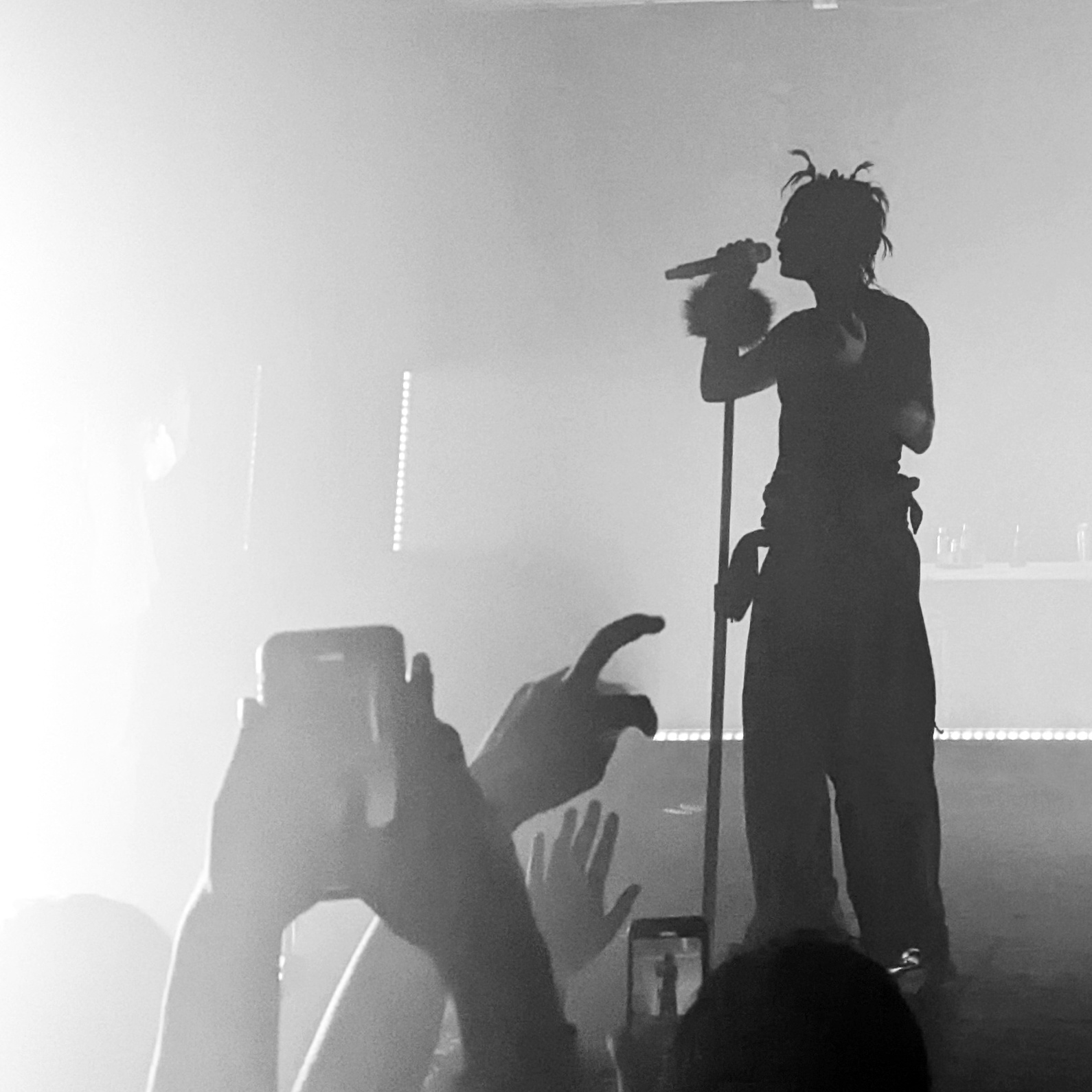
- Ecco2k in 2022

Background information
- Born: Zak Arogundade; 23 October 1994 (age 32); Stockholm, Sweden
- Genres: Pop; cloud rap; hip-hop; experimental; ambient
- Occupations: Rapper; singer-songwriter; record producer; visual artist; fashion designer
- Years active: 2013–present
- Labels: Year0001 (former); Trash Island; 9th. (Ninth)
- Member of: Drain Gang

Zak Arogundade (born 23 October 1994), known professionally as Ecco2k, is a British-Swedish rapper and singer-songwriter. Notable as a founding member of the hip-hop music collective Drain Gang, his lyricism is conscious and intersectional—often discussing themes of queerness, mental health, drug use, and racialization.

Born in Stockholm, Sweden and raised between its Hornstull neighborhood and London, England, Arogundade founded the band Krossad with Benjamin Reichwald (Bladee), his then-classmate, in 2004. Three years later, he founded his first fashion brand, Alaska, and later joined the Swedish shoe brand Eytys as a designer. He founded Drain Gang with childhood friends Reichwald, Thanapat Bunleang (Thaiboy Digital) and Ludwig Rosenberg (Whitearmor) in 2013.

Arogundade appeared on albums with Drain Gang and directed music videos before releasing his debut solo studio album, E, in 2019. He released the EP PXE in 2021, collaborative studio album Crest with Reichwald in 2022, and his second studio album, Echo, in 2026. Arogundade is a private person, choosing to retain a secretive public image.

== Early life ==
Zak Arogundade was born in Stockholm, Sweden, on 23 October 1994. His mother is a Swedish makeup artist, while his father is a British graphic designer, writer, and architect of Nigerian heritage. For a short time, he lived with his father in London, United Kingdom; he spent most of his childhood with his mother in the Hornstull area of Stockholm.

Arogundade had his first experiences with visual art at age five, when his father gifted him a graphics software program and taught him how to use it; Arogundade created album covers and logos for imaginary bands. In 2004, he became classmates with Reichwald and founded the punk-oriented project Krossad ("crushed" in Swedish) the same year. They released a demo CD in 2007. That same year, Arogundade created a fashion label, Alaska, a streetwear brand. Although he was only 16 years old, he managed to develop the brand through online communication with Chinese factory managers who were unaware of his age. This experience led him to join the Swedish sneaker brand Eytys.

== Career ==
=== 2013–2019: Origins, D&G and Trash Island ===
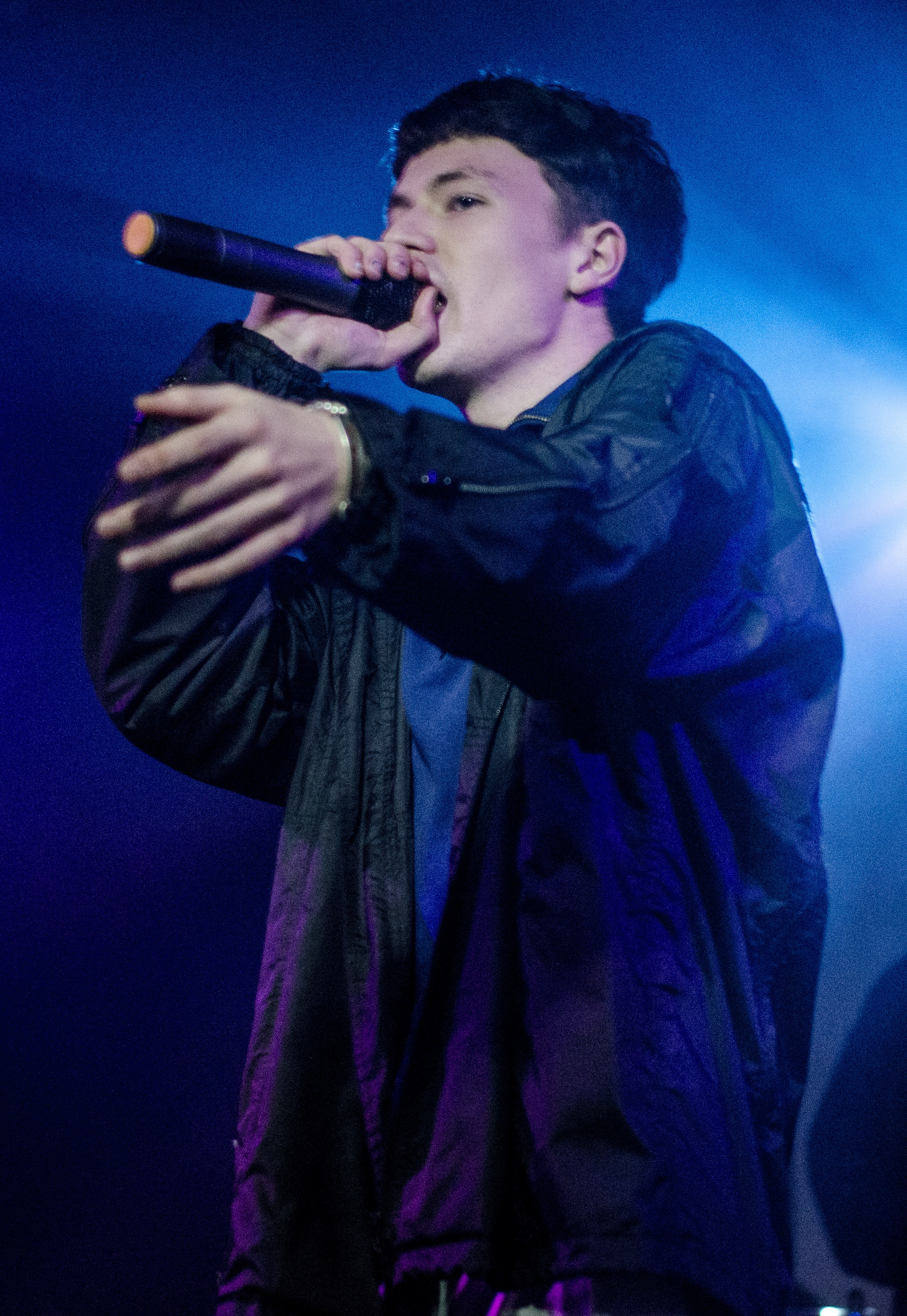
Benjamin Reichwald (Bladee, pictured in 2016), a frequent collaborator of Arogundade

In 2013, Arogundade founded the Drain Gang collective, first called Gravity Boys, with childhood friends Bladee, Thaiboy Digital, and Whitearmor, adopting the alias Ecco2k. The four had been a part of the musical group Smög Boys. The name "Ecco2k" was inspired by the titular character of the Ecco the Dolphin video game series. That same year, Arogundade became Yung Lean's creative director. Still in 2013, Arogundade started his music career by releasing the singles "Bleach", "Hold Me Down Like Gravity", and "Mirage"; "Hold Me Down Like Gravity" received a music video directed by Arogundade himself.

In 2014, Arogundade founded the fashion brand g'LOSS, under which he designed Drain Gang merchandise. Drain Gang signed with Year0001 the following year in 2015. In August 2017, Arogundade co-released the Drain Gang collaborative album D&G. In the same month he was involved in the presentation of Varg²™'s showcase at Berlin Atonal, which ran from 16 to 20 August. Months later on 11 November, Arogundade released an instrumental EP with three tracks, titled Crush Resist or alternatively as ((CR_2015)). Around this time, Arogundade began to perform solo live sets for the first time. In 2018, he modelled at Paris Fashion Week for Alyx Studio; he also appeared at London Fashion Week's "Challenge the Fabric" competition as a panelist.

On 12 September 2019, Ecco2k released Drain Gang's second collaborative album, Trash Island, with Reichwald and Bunleang. The album was recorded when Drain Gang was visiting Thaiboy Digital in Bangkok, Thailand. Arogundade made the album's artwork. Its tracks were produced by Rosenberg with contributions from Mechatok and Lusi.

=== 2019–2020: E ===
Cover for E (2019)

On 27 November 2019, Arogundade released his debut solo studio album, E, which was a surprise album. To record it, Arogundade had to leave his day job as a designer and photo retoucher at Eytys. It was recorded in Stockholm, Berlin, Los Angeles, London, Falun, and Bangkok, and preceded by singles "AAA Powerline" in February 2018 and "Fruit Bleed Juice" in November 2019, with the latter receiving a music video. The album featured guest production from Yves Tumor, Mechatok, and Rosenberg. E was first issued on CD in July 2020 then was issued on vinyl in both June 2021 and December 2022, with the second release featuring artwork from French artist David Rappeneau.

In 2020, Arogundade toured Europe and released more music videos for E songs: "Peroxide" on 29 January and "Security!" on 30 July. That year, he also released singles "Girls Just Want to Have Fun" with Reichwald on 24 February and "Pollen" on 17 September, in which Arogundade sings in Swedish.

=== 2021–2025: PXE and Crest ===
On 31 March 2021, Arogundade released a surprise EP, PXE, fully accompanied by a video from artist and animator Freddy Carrasco. Unlike E, PXE was entirely produced by Arogundade, who said the EP sounded like "throwing a car battery into a washing machine". Arogundade said PXE came after a period of self-discovery, resulting in an understanding of "what [he] wanted to say and how [he] wanted to say it". The EP was named after the kind of "pixie music" which captured Arogundade's "mental space" when composing it—embodying a "kind of wild, trickster energy".

On 19 January 2022, he released the standalone single "Amygdala" with Reichwald. On 17 March, they released a collaborative studio album, Crest, which was recorded in the Swedish countryside. The Fader staff considered it the 22nd best album of 2022, while Pitchfork included it in their list of best progressive pop music of the year. After the album's release, Arogundade toured worldwide with Drain Gang in their first world tour as a collective.

Arogundade left the Year0001 label in 2023. On 19 April 2024, Arogundade released a collaborative single with Reichwald and Bunleang, "TL;DR". Arogundade headed the art direction and executive production of Lean's fourth studio album, Jonatan, which released on 2 May 2025. On 14 May, Arogundade released the song "MAKKA" with British rapper fakemink, produced by longtime collaborator Mechatok. He performed at the Sydney Opera House on 1 June. On 12 June, Arogundade was featured alongside Reichwald on Mechatok's "Expression on Your Face" from his debut studio album Wide Awake. Alessandra Rincon writing for Ones to Watch said the "unique" vocal performance added "depth to the track, creating a dynamic interplay between the three artists".

=== 2026–present: Echo ===
Following a 5-year hiatus from solo work as the first track since PXE in 2021, during which Arogundade's retirement from music had been speculated by fans, Arogundade released the single "Aldehydes and Ketones", produced by longtime Sad Boys collaborator Gud on 22 October 2026. The song was accompanied by a self-directed, "dystopian" music video, filmed across twelve countries over six years, in which Arogundade portrays a character named "Echo" exploring industrial, urban, and partially constructed environments. On 3 November, Arogundade released a second single "Sky Burial," produced by Rosenberg and accompanied by another self-directed music video. On 10 November, Arogundade announced the release of his second studio album, Echo, for 12 November, which would include the previous two singles.

== Artistry ==
Arogundade is part of Drain Gang, a group of electronic and cloud rap musicians which rose to prominence in the mid-2010s SoundCloud era. However, Arogundade's musical style has been described as distinct from the other members and their associated genres, incorporating elements of ambient music, avant-garde music, and experimental rap. Although Drain Gang's music is intimate, their lyrics often reflect universal human experiences, rather than specifically their own. Arogundade has maintained a separation between himself and his music, explaining that he does not see Ecco2k as representative of who he is as a person. Jayson Greene of Pitchfork wrote that Arogundade produced "dissociation music" with "numb disorientation, but with flutey, high, fairy-like voices flitting about the mix", and that he "sounds less like a human and more like a pixelated sprite." Greene added: "The immersion in smoother and more hospitable worlds than the real one is everywhere." Writing for the same website, Nadine Smith noted Arogundade's "fluttering, almost angelic falsetto." David Crone of AllMusic said that, in 2013, Arogundade's style was "rough yet original, combining distant, hollowed-out vocals with cloudy instrumentals and emotive lyricism." He added that over the decade, Arogundade "embraced technological, forward-thinking sounds taking influence from the rising hyperpop and hyper-rap subgenres," consolidating his futuristic style with E in 2019.

Like other members of Drain Gang, Arogundade is a self-taught musician. Arogundade has said he produces his works towards personal goals rather than Western values of "a single and correct answer to everything," including to maximize "how much commercially valuable work [he] can produce in a given time." As a designer and editor, Arogundade directs and edits most of his own music videos—many of which feature industrial and technology aesthetics. He has also directed and edited multiple music videos for other artists, including Tumor. Commenting on his video work, he said he attempts to "express that there is beauty and magic here, but without putting special effects on it," which he likened to a "documentarian, naturalist style." Applying the sentiment to both his visual and musical work, which he does not view as "separate," Arogundade has said he wants "to illustrate that there is more [in his work] than what you see."

== Public image ==
Initially, Arogundade attempted to maintain privacy and secrecy regarding his personal life; until 2018, he kept his Instagram account private, as he dislikes making his personal information public. Although he has attempted to distance himself from Drain Gang's "cult following" and "obsessive fanbase" in the past, his fans have hacked his cellphone and social media accounts, leaked his music, and contacted his relatives. He commented that he found it "strange... to be such a big part of other people's lives". He has been impersonated on Facebook at least twice.

=== Political views ===
Despite the members of Drain Gang not subscribing to right-wing or white supremacist ideologies, their fanbase was still significantly composed of alt-right people, especially visible during the 2016 United States presidential election. However, Reichwald and Ecco2k have increasingly incorporated queer and intersectional themes into their work, including Arogundade's feminine presentation in the "Amygdala" music video in 2020. Arogundade has additionally explored themes of mental health, drug use, and racial dynamics in his work; he has publicly expressed supporting the Black Lives Matter movement, including to attend a march in Stockholm. The inclusion of these themes increased the visibility of Drain Gang's LGBTQ listenership and helped nonbinary, queer, and transgender people embrace their own identities. Cassidy George of 032c wrote: "Drain Gang’s ability to articulate a strain of suffering that is specific to the internet age has bred a fandom encompassing the two most extreme poles of the contemporary political spectrum".

In 2026, Arogundade said that "he has and will always vote left", criticized the rise of nationalism in Europe and expressed opposition to countries refusing to accept refugees. He added: "There's some stuff—like people being reluctant to call themselves feminists or to say they're pro-Palestine—that, to me, is kind of comparable to being like, 'Yeah, I'm a Nazi'. That's just anti-human on a pretty fundamental level."

== Discography ==
Solo albums

- E (2019)
- Echo (2026)

Collaborative albums

- D&G (2017) (with Bladee and Thaiboy Digital)
- Trash Island (2019) (with Bladee and Thaiboy Digital)
- Crest (2022) (with Bladee)
