= Kartlis Deda =

Sculpture

Coordinates: 41°41′17.0″N 44°48′16.5″E

Mother Georgian
- Kartvlis Deda (Georgian); ქართვლის დედა (Georgian)
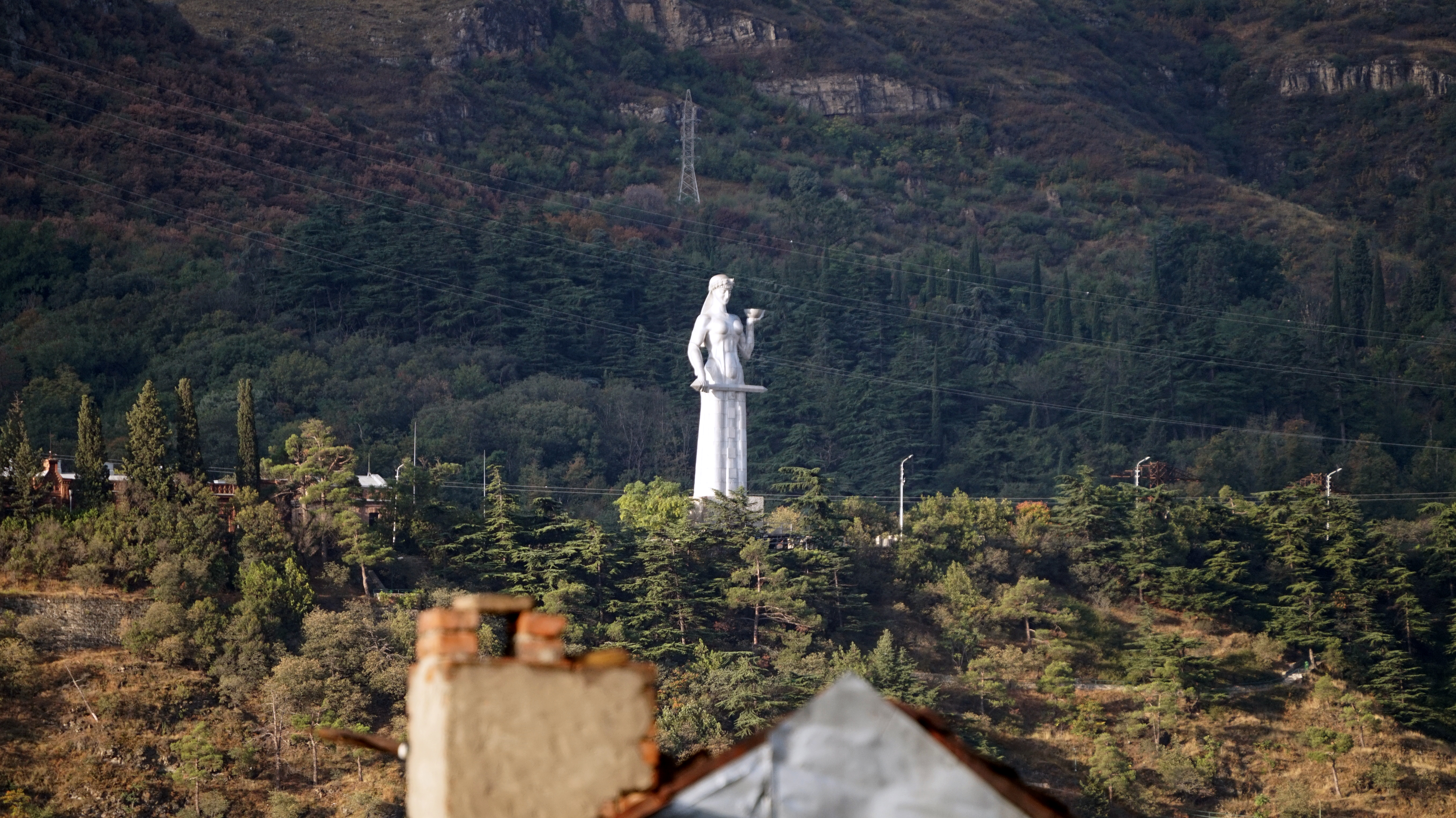
- The monument in 2016

- Location within Georgia
- Location: Sololaki Hill, Tbilisi, Georgia

History
- Built: 1958

Site notes
- Height: 20 meters (66 feet)
- Sculptor: Elguja Amashukeli

Kartlis Deda (Georgian: ქართვლის დედა; Mother of Kartvel or Mother of Georgians) is a monument in Georgia's capital Tbilisi.

The statue was erected on the top of Sololaki hill in 1958, the year Tbilisi celebrated its 1500th anniversary. Prominent Georgian sculptor Elguja Amashukeli designed the twenty-meter aluminium figure of a woman in Georgian national dress.

== Symbolism ==
She symbolizes the Georgian national character: in her left hand she holds a bowl of wine to greet those who come as friends, and in her right hand is a sword for those who come as enemies.

== History ==
In 1966 Elguja Amashukeli was awarded the Shota Rustaveli State Prize for this sculpture. He called the statue "Capital", and it commonly became known as "Mother of Kartvel". The accessories of the sculpture, the cup with wine and sword, are an expression of the history of our city, Tbilisi, the endless battles with the enemies and the welcoming of friendly guests.

The original statue erected on Sololaki Hill in 1958 was a wooden allegorical statue that would temporarily decorate the capital. Later it was decided to become permanent and the wood texture was covered with aluminum in 1963 to limit environmental damage. In 1997, the old statue was replaced with a new one.

== Gallery ==
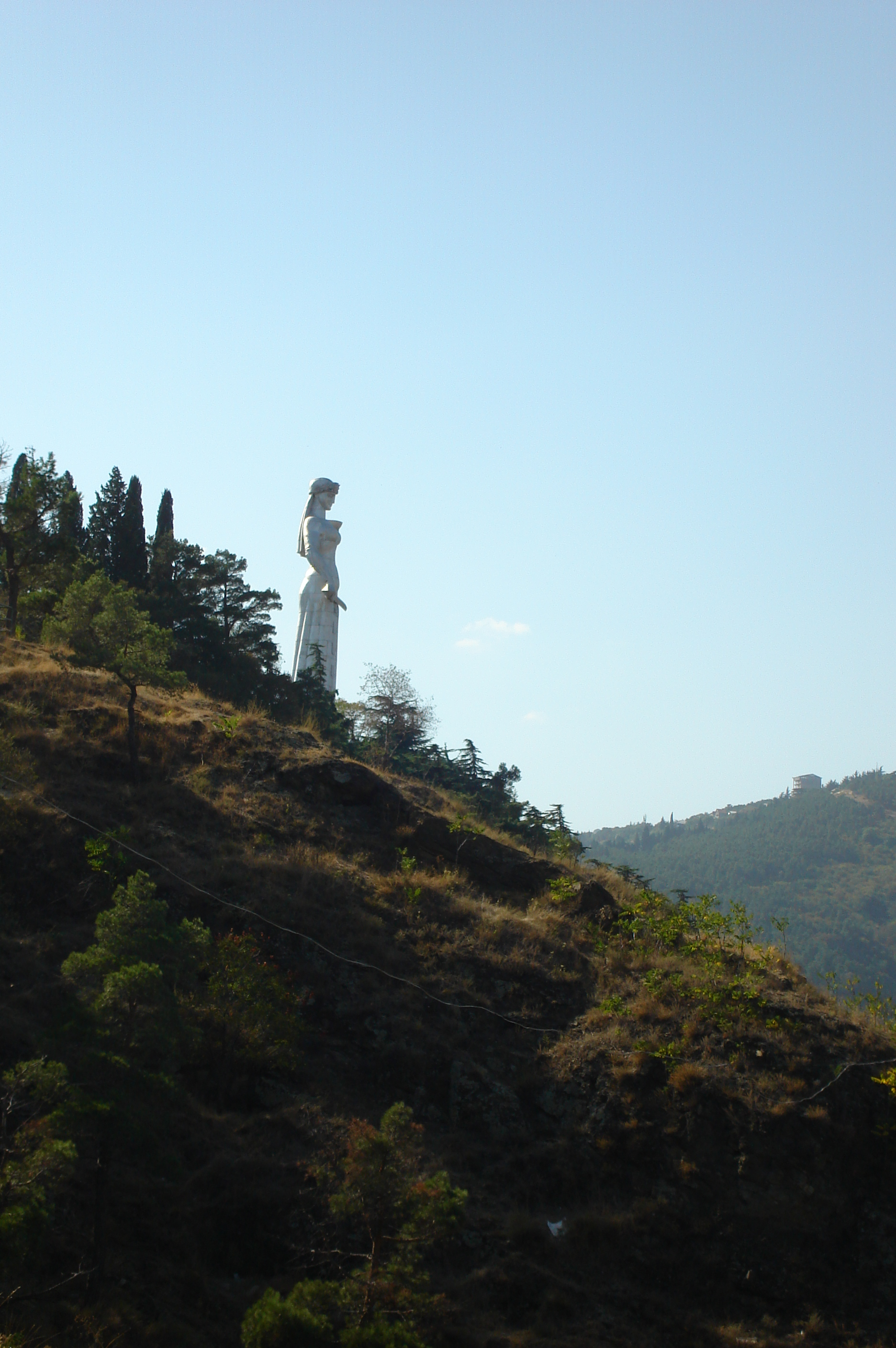
Side view with the hill

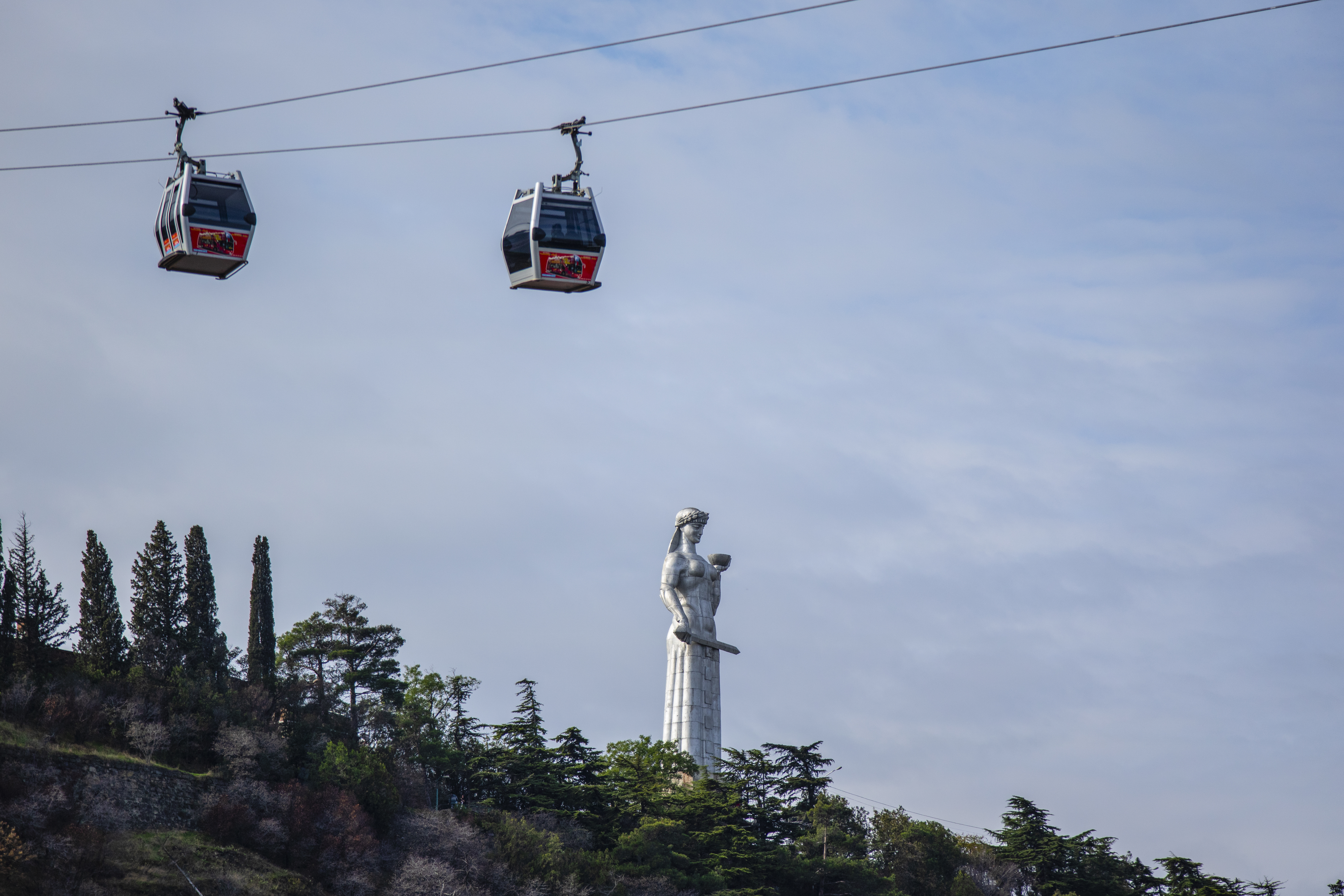
Statue with cable cars in the foreground

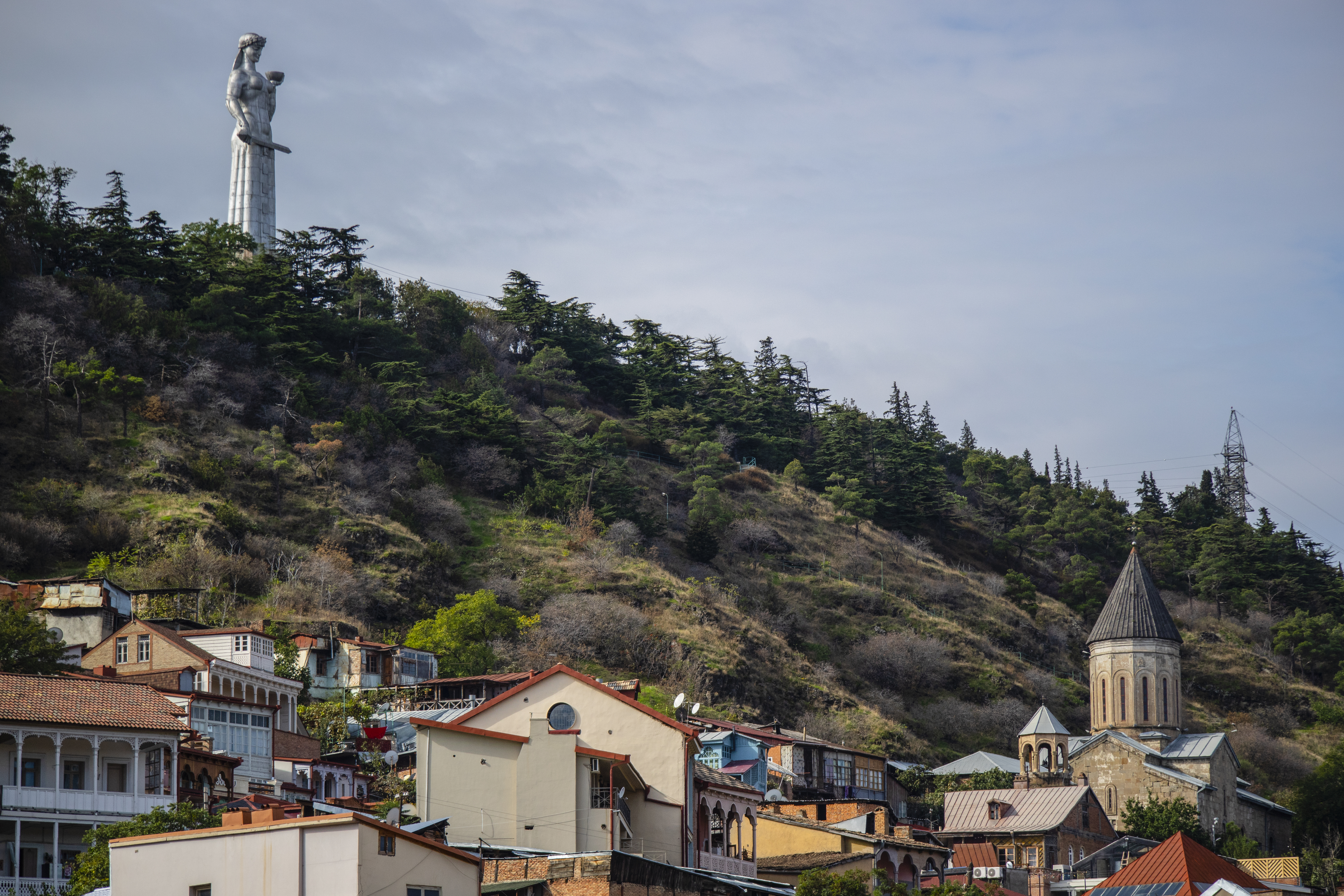
The statue from the bottom of the hill, side view

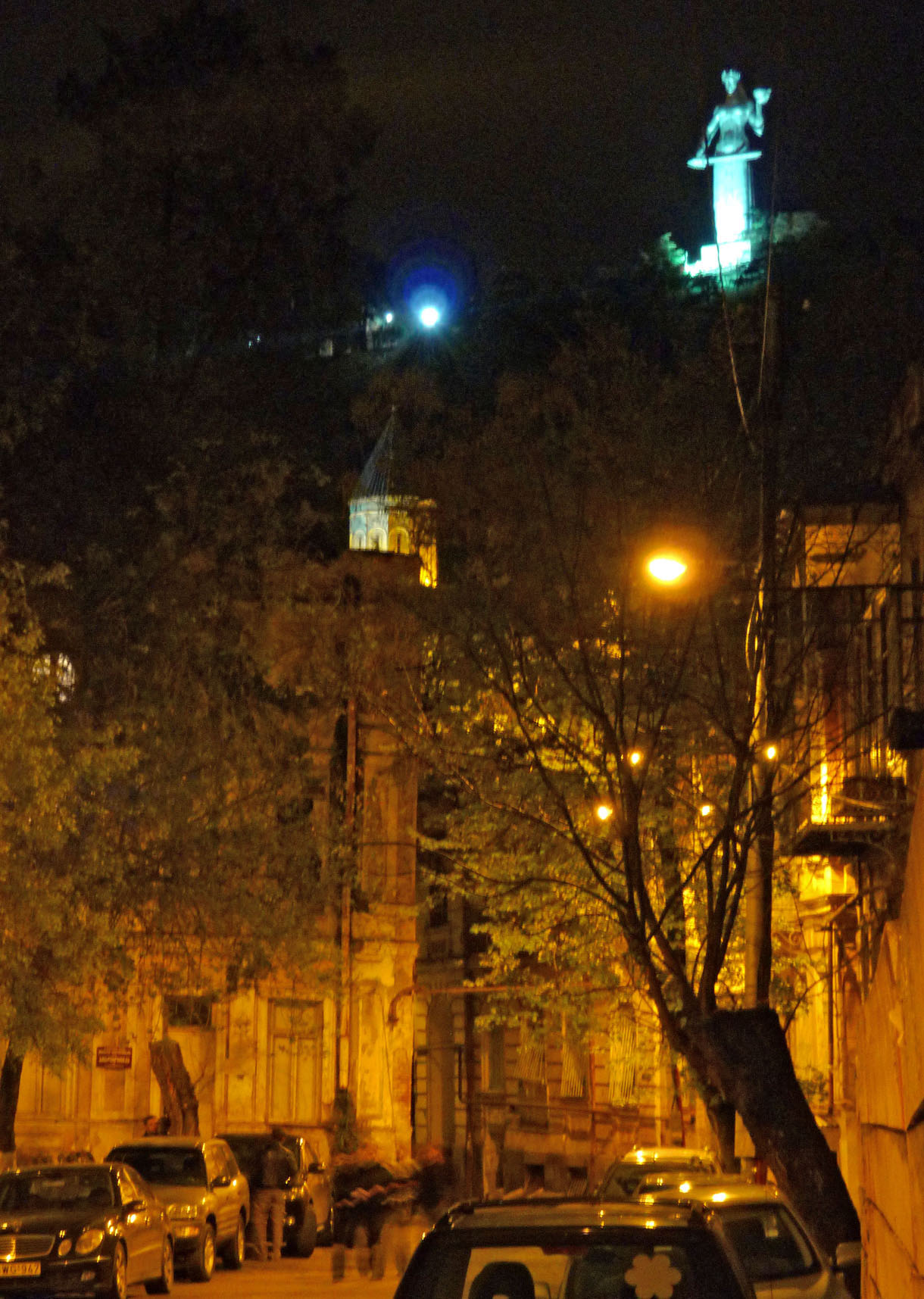
Statue from the bottom of the hill, night view

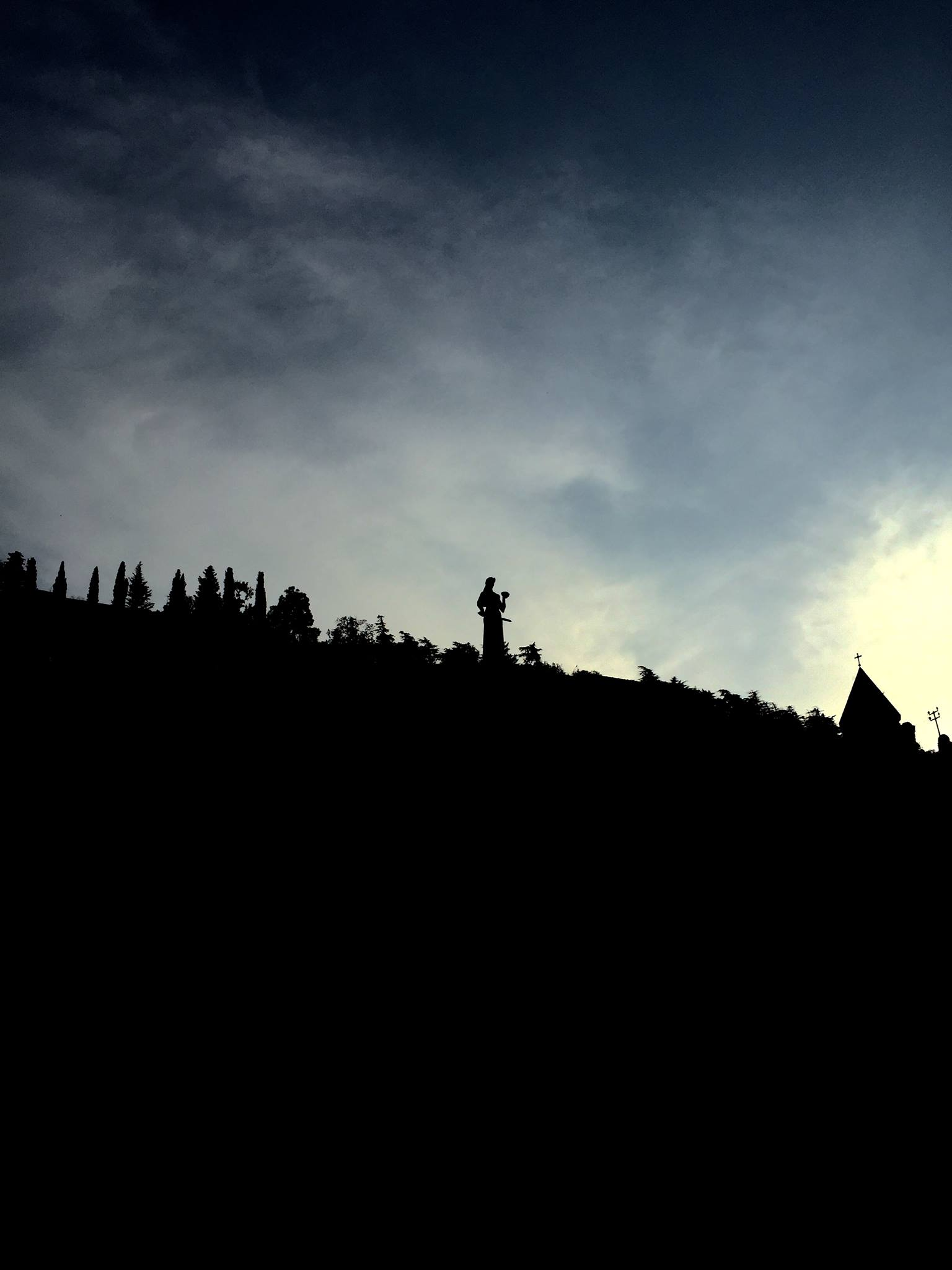
Statue at twilight

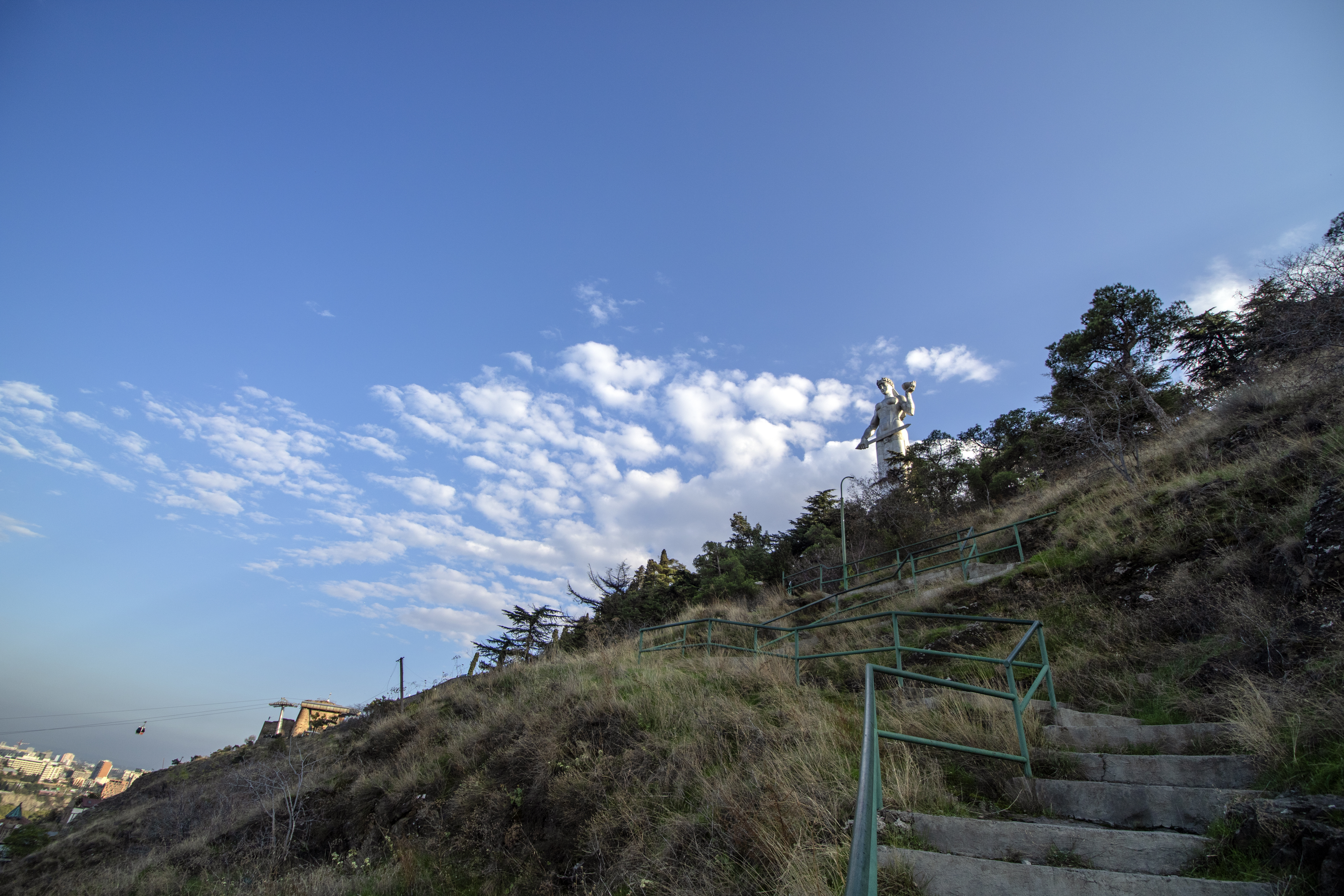
Statue from stairwell

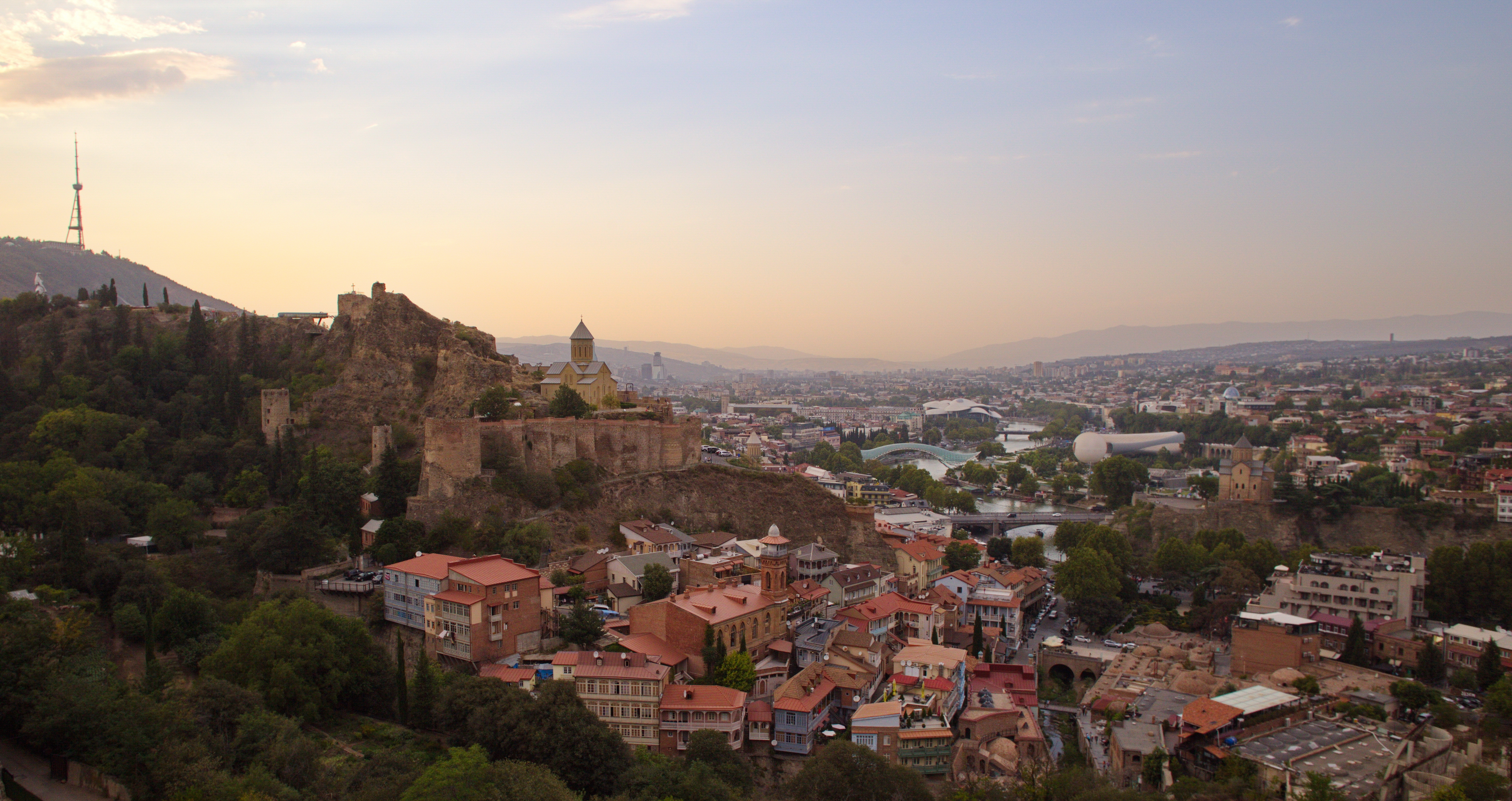
View of the statue (far left) in relation to the city of Tbilisi

View from the west (1975)

== See also ==
- List of tallest statues
- Mother Armenia
- Mother Ukraine
