= Ourika Valley =

Valley in the Atlas Mountains, Morocco

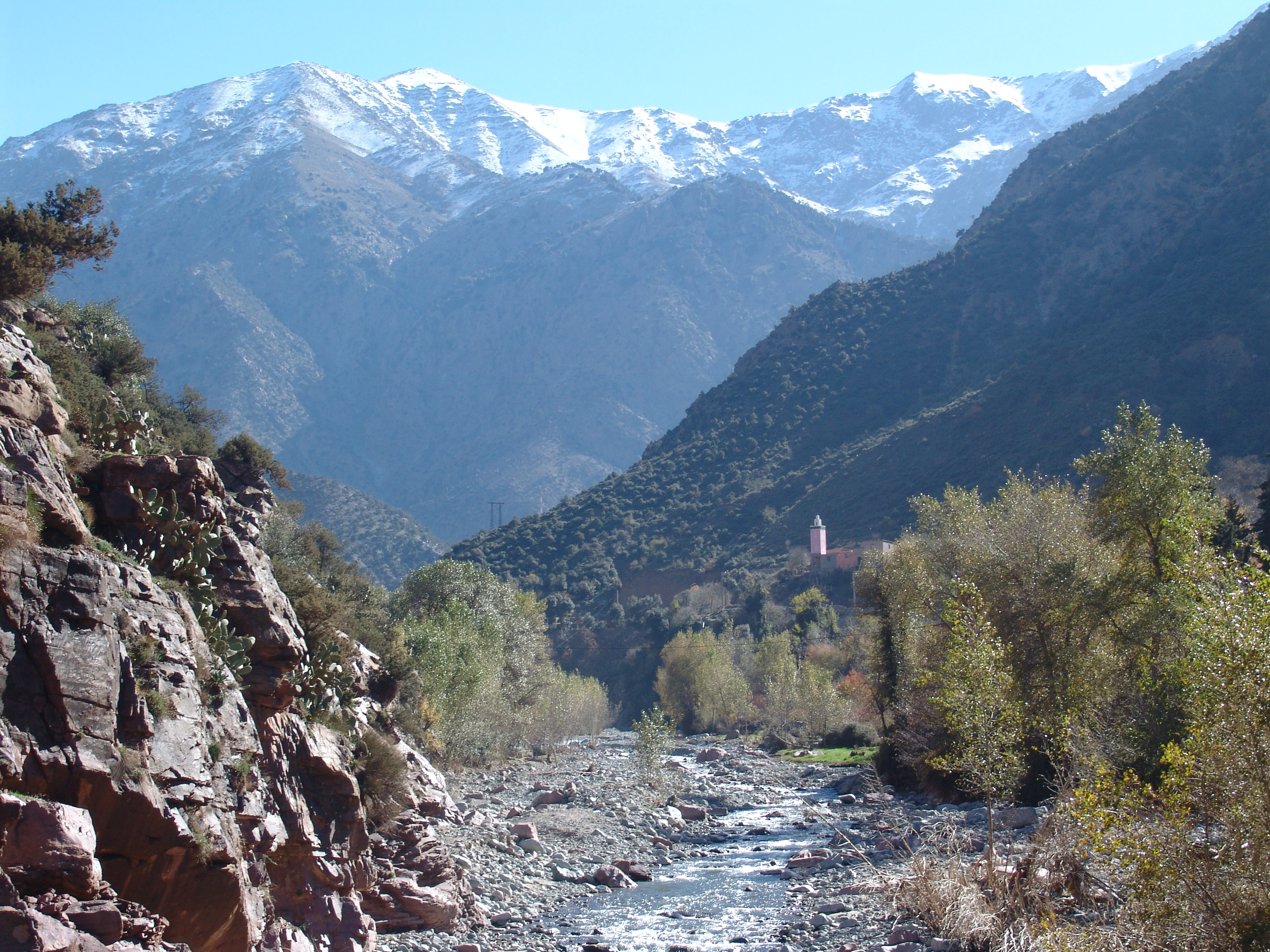
- Ourika Valley

- Location within Morocco

Naming
- Native name: وادي أوريكا (Arabic)

Geography
- Coordinates: 31°20′37″N 7°45′05″W
- Interactive map of Ourika Valley

Ourika Valley is a valley in the Moroccan High Atlas along the Ourika River. It is located around 30 km from Marrakesh, and is essentially populated by Berber people speaking Shilha. Despite its proximity to Marrakesh, it is still considered a relatively well-preserved valley, by its very nature it preserves the traditional mountain way of life.

== History ==
Ourika is the name of one of the most famous tribes, written by Ibn Khaldoun.

== Monuments and touristic sites ==
=== Setti-Fatma ===
Setti-Fatma is the last small town (or douar) which is accessible by the paved route. It is the departure point for many excursions to the nearby mountains. The most prized and most easy hike consists of mounting the length of a mountain torrent in order to discover the cascades.

=== Tnine-de-l’Ourika ===
It is a little village (or douar) without great architectural interest. It is however the center of the weekly traditional market (or souk), taking place every Monday (or tnine in Arabic).

=== ANIMA Garden ===
Among the valley’s attractions is Anima Garden, a botanical and sculpture garden established by Austrian artist André Heller on formerly arid land.

== See also ==
- Oukaimden
