= E (Ecco2k album) =

Studio album by Ecco2k
- Released: 27 November 2019
- Recorded: 2017–2019
- Genres: Pop; hip-hop; experimental; ambient; electronic
- Length: 30:23
- Label: Year0001
- Producers: Gud; Whitearmor; Shanti; Mechatok

Ecco2k chronology
Trash Island (2019)	E (2019)	PXE (2021)

Singles from E
- 1. "AAA Powerline" Released: 2 February 2018; 2. "Fruit Bleed Juice" Released: 25 November 2019

E (stylized as an estimated sign, ℮) is the debut studio album by the British-Swedish rapper Ecco2k. A surprise album, it was released on 27 November 2019 through Year0001. Previously known for his work on other people's projects, Ecco2k began working on the album after leaving his day job at Eytys. It was recorded across multiple cities and executive-produced by Gud and Whitearmor. Musically, multiple reviewers noted the album's contrast with Ecco2k's previous works, in addition to its futuristic sound and personal lyrical themes. Reviewers described E as bringing Ecco2k into the spotlight, and The Fader said it was a "standout release" for 2019. In 2025, it appeared in the Scottish Albums and UK Independent Albums charts.

== Background and release ==
I still feel like a manic perfectionist, but my idea of perfection has changed as I've gotten to know myself better. I let chaos back in. That's what allowed E to happen.

— Ecco2k, 2019

Before the release of E, Ecco2k had maintained a "mysterious" figure. Releasing music under that pseudonym since 2013, he was known for his participation on other people's projects, including as a member of Drain Gang, as the creative director of Yung Lean and as the music video editor of Yves Tumor. (Note: Attributed to multiple references:) Ecco2k described the winter of 2018, when the album was still in its early stages, as "a period of rapid growth and self-discovery"; he had just left his day job as a designer and photo retoucher at Eytys. Following this, he learned to prioritise self-care in his creative practice.

E was recorded in Stockholm, Berlin, Los Angeles, London, Falun, and Bangkok. Ecco2k had to purposefully seclude himself from collaborators and friends. He described the process as "the first time where [he] started to get assisted". The album was executive-produced by Gud and Whitearmor. The cover art features an estimated sign. It was preceded by singles "AAA Powerline" and "Fruit Bleed Juice", with the latter receiving a music video. E was released on 27 November 2019, accompanied by a press release where Ecco2k said: "I find something new in me every day. Here's what I've found so far". After its release, Ecco2k toured Europe. On 29 January 2020, he released a music video "Peroxide", which was recorded at the Lillgrund Wind Farm. On 30 July, he released a music video for "Security!".

== Composition ==
Multiple critics noted that E demonstrated a change from Ecco2k's previous rap and hip-hop productions; Dazed and Pitchfork writer Nadine Smith described it as contemporary pop, with the latter adding that it was the most pop-like of the Stockholm rap scene until then. Yannik Gölz of laut.de said that it is hip-hop so deconstructed that it resembled a fusion between experimental and ambient music. Other reviewers found the album futuristic. David Crone of AllMusic wrote that E consolidated the futuristic sound Ecco2k was developing that decade, while Gölz described it as a mix between hip-hop and futuristic electronic. Anthony Fantano of The Needle Drop described it as futuristic and new age-like, blending elements from Yung Lean's Unknown Death 2002, trap, art pop, glitch, experimental electronic, and PC Music aesthetics. The Quietus's Zac Cazes highlighted the album's balance between psychedelic electronica and dream pop. Torsten Ingvaldsen of Hypebeast said that E contained the elements that made Ecco2k achieve "cult fame within the worlds of avant-pop and cloud rap". Laird Borrelli-Persson of Vogue said that, despite its "atmospheric production", "this isn't music for somnambulists; there's a sense of urgency even to the dreamy tracks". Jordan Darville of The Fader described E as a "project of subliminal bangers", with a feel that was "regal-yet-desolate, like a marble sculpture of some unspeakable tragedy".

Laird Borrelli-Persson of Vogue noted that, while E addresses universal topics, the album is highly personal. Thomas Sobolik of The Face said that E feels like a direct connection to Ecco2k's thoughts, with vivid lyrics and honest delivery. He further added that the songs address "romantic longing, substance abuse, insomnia and existential dread in a redemptive arc delivered through oblique lyrics that follow their own dream logic". Fantano described the songwriting as "impressionistic". Nöjesguiden writer Levi Hielle-Bergstrom noted the album's contrasts, including the charming melodies and experimental productions existing alongside fragile lyrics and the mix between love lyrics and lyrics about destructiveness. Similarly, Gölz said that the album, while minimalistic, is still sensorily maximalist, and Ingvaldsen said that the "melodious instrumentals propel [Ecco2k's] hazy lyricism forth". According to Borrelli-Persson, the lyrics explore the differences between perception and reality, including the differences between people's social and inner selves. Smith felt that the lyrics "twinge with anguish and self-loathing". Borrelli-Persson said that, although Ecco2k has embraced his differences as strengths, he reveals his vulnerability in these tracks. Zac Cazes of The Quietus noted that Ecco2k sings in an extremely high auto-tuned falsetto, with Gölz saying that Ecco2k's light helium-like voice is central to E.

== Songs ==
E begins with "AAA Powerline", which centers around the repeated line "Zip-tied up / Can't move my arms." Smith described it as an example of a track on the album with "phrases repeated like fading memories turned over and over again in your mind". The second track, "Peroxide", is a futuristic pop song where Ecco2k ruminates on his skin color. Sobolik wrote that the track establishes the foundation for E's "bracing self-portrayal", with "Ecco [baring] Arogundade's early encounters with otherness". According to Sobolik, Ecco2k narrates his deep, anxious confusion, but ultimately embraces his strength, singing: "No peroxide, I stay dark." Smith said that the line "They all stare at me / I don't care at all" demonstrates Ecco2k's self-acceptance and commitment to self-expression. The next song is "Fragile", which Fantano described as the most new age inspired song on the album with its "gorgeous and pristine layers of synths". He also described its lyrics as "disturbing and surreal". The fourth track, "Bliss Fields", is not a song, but a "skit" or interlude, where Ecco2k says: "I feel like I'm flying and sinking at the same time. Like I'm being pulled from below and from above. In every direction, at once." This phrase was taken from Ecco2k's Notes diary.

"Fruit Bleed Juice" is E's fifth track. Describing it as a chaotic ambient recording, Gölz suggested it feels more like immersive cinema than a conventional song. The subsequent song, "Cc", contains a "futuristic trap beat that's so cold it's sub-zero", according to Fantano, while also presenting Ecco2k's vocals in a glitchy manner. On "Calcium", E's seventh track, Ecco2k blends light rapping with pop-punk vocal elements over beats reminiscent of Charli XCX's style; Smith felt that the track could have a mainstream appeal. It is followed by "Sugar & Diesel", a traditional rap song according to Gölz, and then by "Don't Ask". On "Security!", the album's tenth track, Ecco2k's expresses his internal struggles, lamenting, "Every time I look in the mirror I see monsters," and yearning to hide an inner perceived ugliness: "How did you get so perfect? / I wish that I was perfect." "Time", according to Gölz, has electronic beats and is one of the most danceable on the album, with its lyrics presenting themes of hedonism, self-destruction, and excess. Fantano described it as containing "slightly aggressive rap flows" and intelligent dance music-like "glistening layers of electronics". Borrelli-Persson said that it "evokes the sweaty, beyond-tired feeling of a magical night fading into [the] morning". On "Blue Eyes", the album's final track in its standard edition, Ecco2k addresses the white Swedish gaze, while distorted screams serve as the backing vocals.

== Critical reception ==
Professional ratings
Review scores
Source	Rating
laut.de	4/5 stars
The Needle Drop	7/10 (Note: Fantano gave it a "strong 6 to a light 7".)
Pitchfork	7.4/10

Some reviewers described E as bringing Ecco2k into the spotlight, while Thomas Sobolik of The Face said that "E is Arogundade's first definitive musical statement, an album that recounts life-spanning experiences and molds the cloud-rap and electronic sounds he and his friends pioneered into a palate that's distinctly his." Nöjesguiden writer Levi Hielle-Bergstrom praised E's peculiarity as it ventures into unexplored domains, and called Ecco2k a visionary. Ingvaldsen said that Ecco2k "ebbs and flows between his inner turmoil and hopes for better days, promulgating an evolution of his esoteric artistry".

Commenting on Ecco2k's mystery figure, Zac Cazes wrote to The Quietus that E "does little to dispel the artist's sense of mystery", while also highlighting its varied production and praising it as Gud and Whitearmor's "most accomplished effort". Yannik Gölz of laut.de described it as a unique album with a compelling listening experience. Anthony Fantano of The Needle Drop felt that E had more potential, with some songs feeling one-dimensional, though recognizing that the album had some "beautiful" sounds and ideas. In retrospect, Jordan Darville of The Fader described E as "a standout release of 2019". In 2025, E appeared in two charts by the Official Charts Company: the Scottish Albums at 95 and the UK Independent Albums at 36.

== Track listing ==
E track listing
No.	Title	Writer(s)	Producer(s)	Length
1.	"AAA Powerline"	Zak Arogundade; Sean Bowie	Shanti	4:12
2.	"Peroxide"	Arogundade; Carl-Mikael Berlander	Gud	3:34
3.	"Fragile"	Arogundade; Berlander	Gud	2:53
4.	"Bliss Fields"	Arogundade; Berlander	Gud	0:22
5.	"Fruit Bleed Juice"	Arogundade; Bowie	Shanti	1:12
6.	"Cc"	Arogundade; Berlander; Ludwig Rosenberg	Gud; Whitearmor	2:34
7.	"Calcium"	Arogundade; Rosenberg	Whitearmor	3:44
8.	"Sugar & Diesel"	Arogundade; Rosenberg	Whitearmor	3:19
9.	"Don't Ask"	Arogundade; Rosenberg	Whitearmor	2:20
10.	"Security!"	Arogundade; Timur Tokdemir	Mechatok; Gud	2:35
11.	"Time"	Arogundade; Berlander	Gud	2:01
12.	"Blue Eyes"	Arogundade; Berlander; Rosenberg	Gud	1:33
Total length:				30:23

Physical edition bonus track
No.	Title	Writer(s)	Producer(s)	Length
13.	"Life After Life"	Arogundade; Rosenberg	Whitearmor; Gud	2:22
Total length:				32:45

== Personnel ==
- Gud – executive production, mixing
- Whitearmor – executive production
- Robin Schmidt – mastering
- Zak Arogundade – creative direction, art direction
- Victor Svedberg – additional layouting
- Daniel Sannwald – photography

== Charts ==
Chart performance for E
Chart (2025)	Peak position
Scottish Albums (Official Charts)	95
UK Independent Albums (Official Charts)	36
