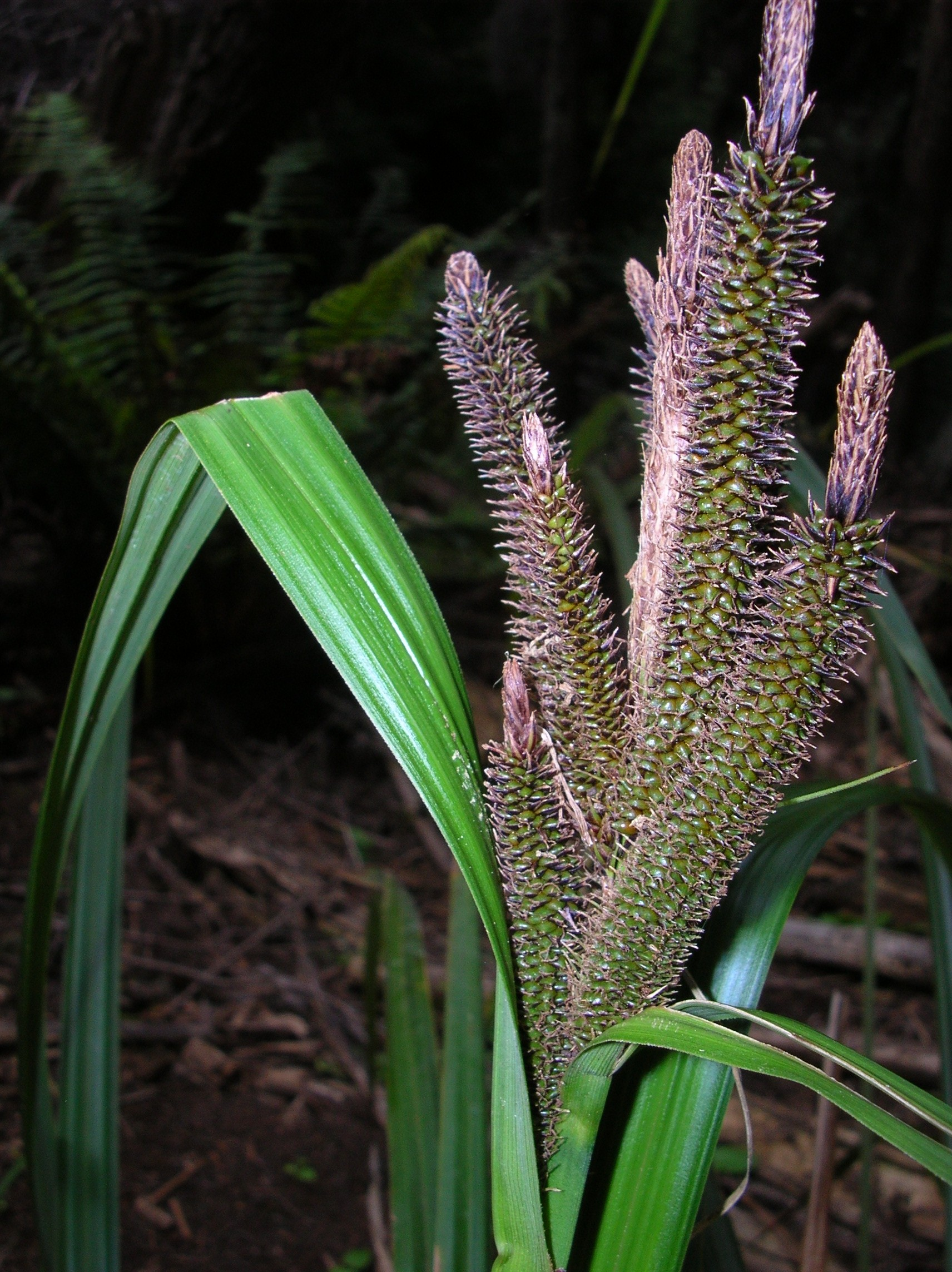
- At Polipoli Spring State Recreation Area, Maui

Scientific classification
- Kingdom: Plantae
- Clade: Tracheophytes
- Clade: Angiosperms
- Clade: Monocots
- Clade: Commelinids
- Order: Poales
- Family: Cyperaceae
- Genus: Carex
- Species: C. alligata

Binomial name
- Carex alligata Boott

Synonyms
- Carex pluvia R.W.Krauss; Carex sandwicensis Boeckeler

= Carex alligata =

Species of grass-like plant

Carex alligata, the Hawaiʻi sedge, is a species of sedge that is endemic to Hawaii.

It was first described in 1867 by American botanist Francis Boott (1792–1863).

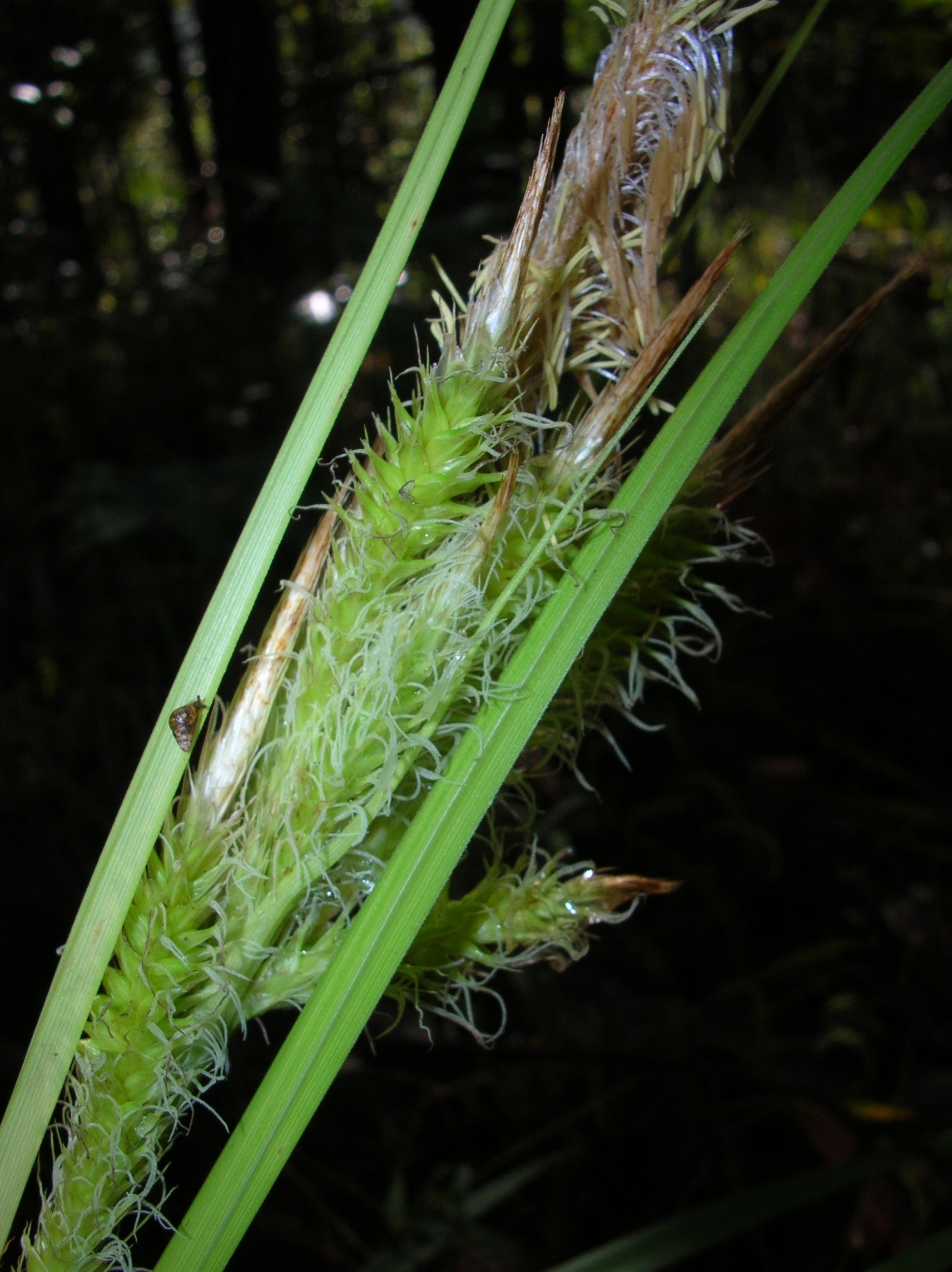
In flower

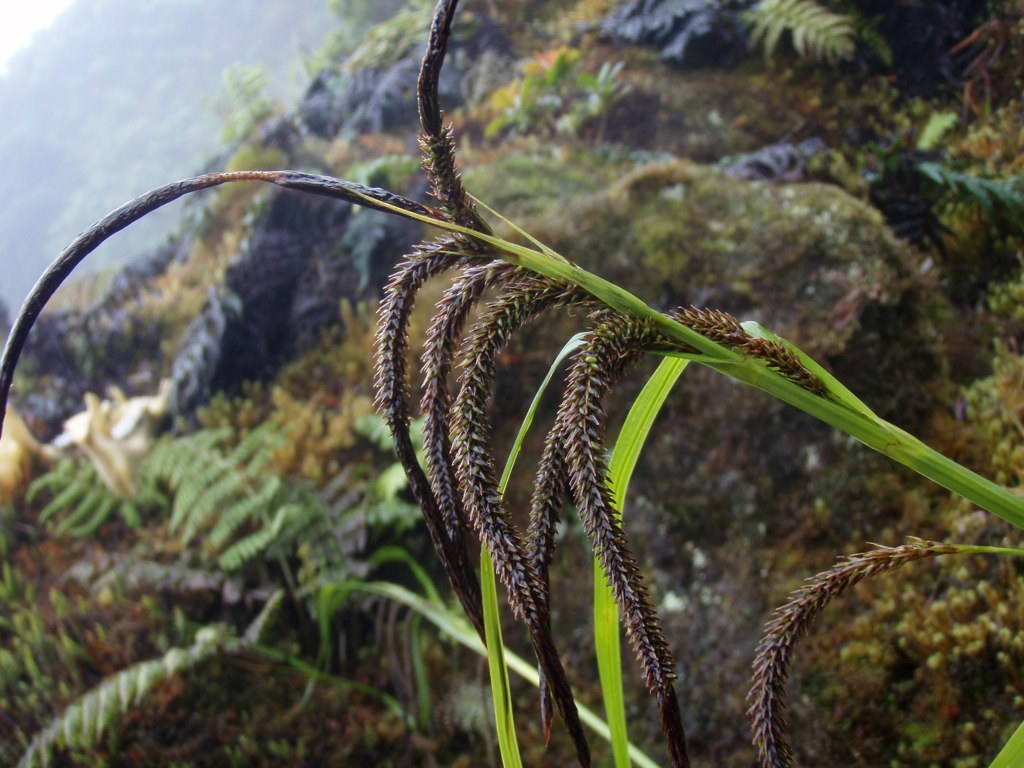
At Mount Waialeale, Kauai
