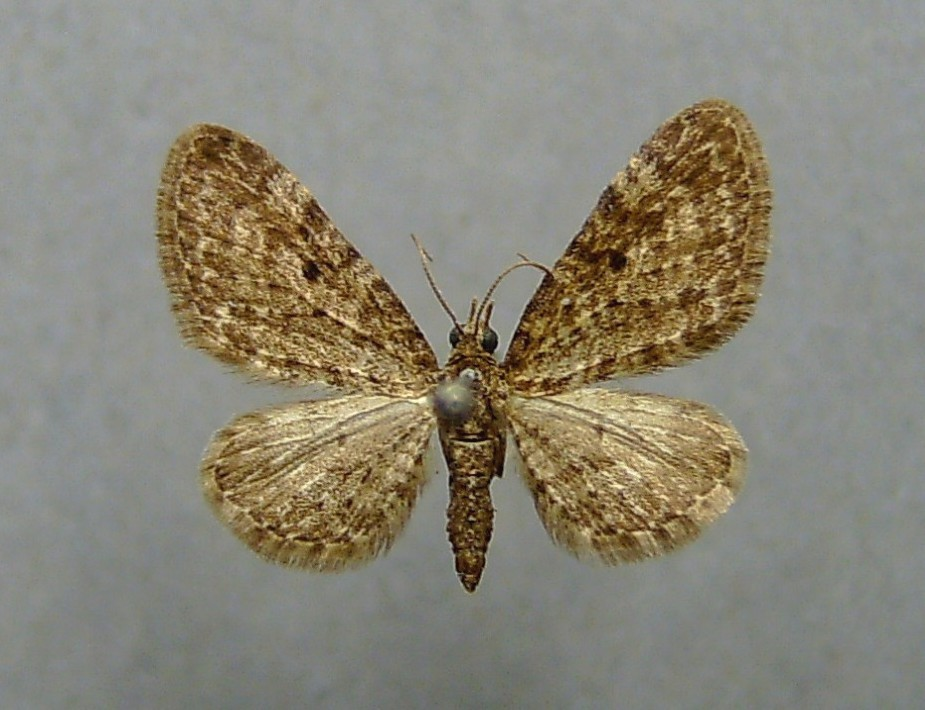

Scientific classification
- Domain: Eukaryota
- Kingdom: Animalia
- Phylum: Arthropoda
- Class: Insecta
- Order: Lepidoptera
- Family: Geometridae
- Genus: Eupithecia
- Species: E. silenata

Binomial name
- Eupithecia silenata Assmann, 1848

= Eupithecia silenata =

Species of moth

Eupithecia silenata is a moth of the family Geometridae. It is found in the mountainous areas of central and southern Europe, in the east, the range extends to the Krkonoše mountains and the Caucasus.

The wingspan is 17–21 mm. There is one generation per year with adults on wing from May to June.

The larvae feed on Silene vulgaris species. Larvae can be found from July to September. It overwinters as a pupa.
