= Museum of Natural History, University of Wrocław =

Natural history museum in Poland

- Muzeum Przyrodnicze Uniwersytetu Wrocławskiego
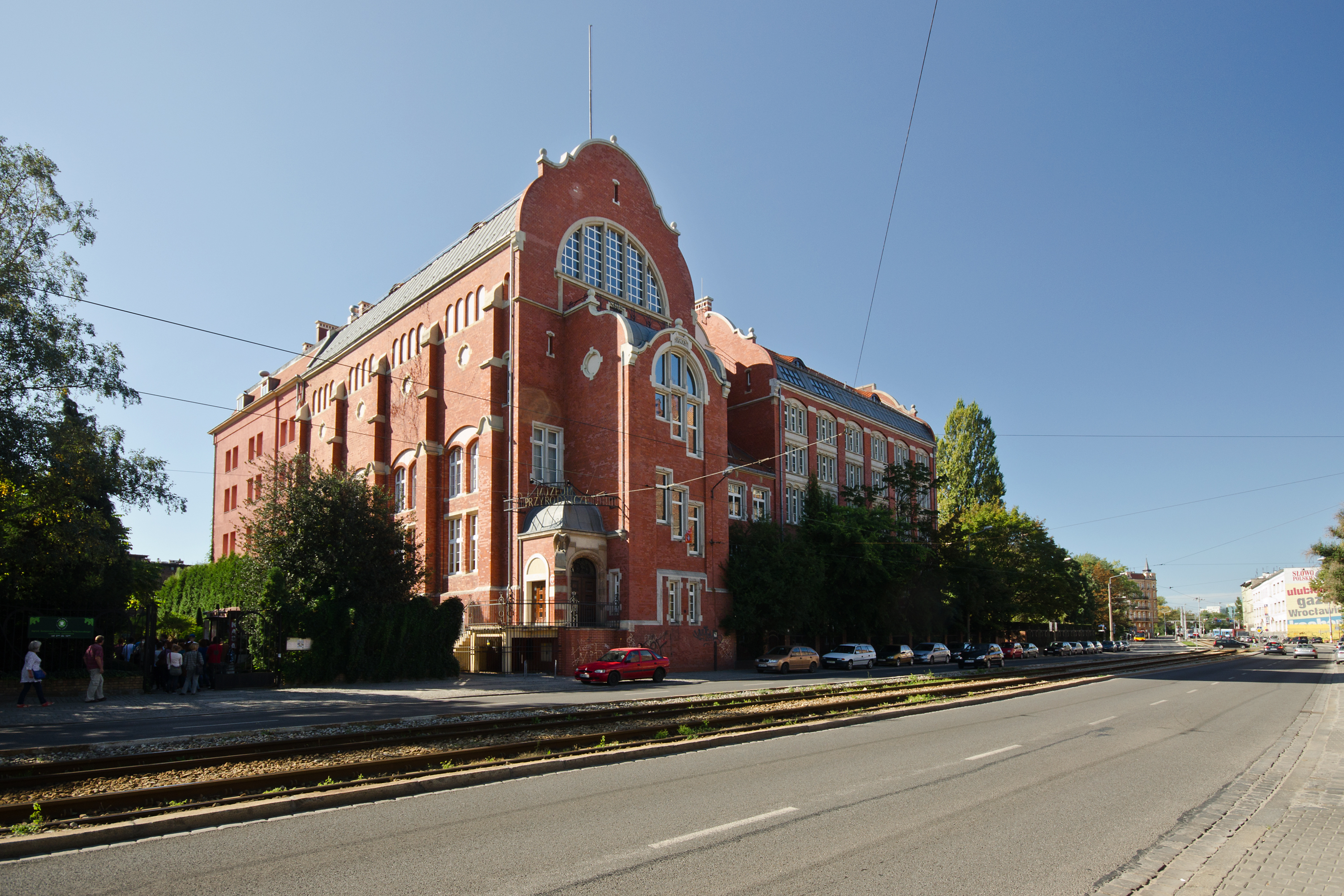
- Established: 1814
- Location: Sienkiewicza 21; 50-335 Wrocław, Poland
- Coordinates: 51°07′01″N 17°02′47″E
- Type: Natural history museum
- Director: Jan Kotusz
- Website: www.muzeum-przyrodnicze.uni.wroc.pl

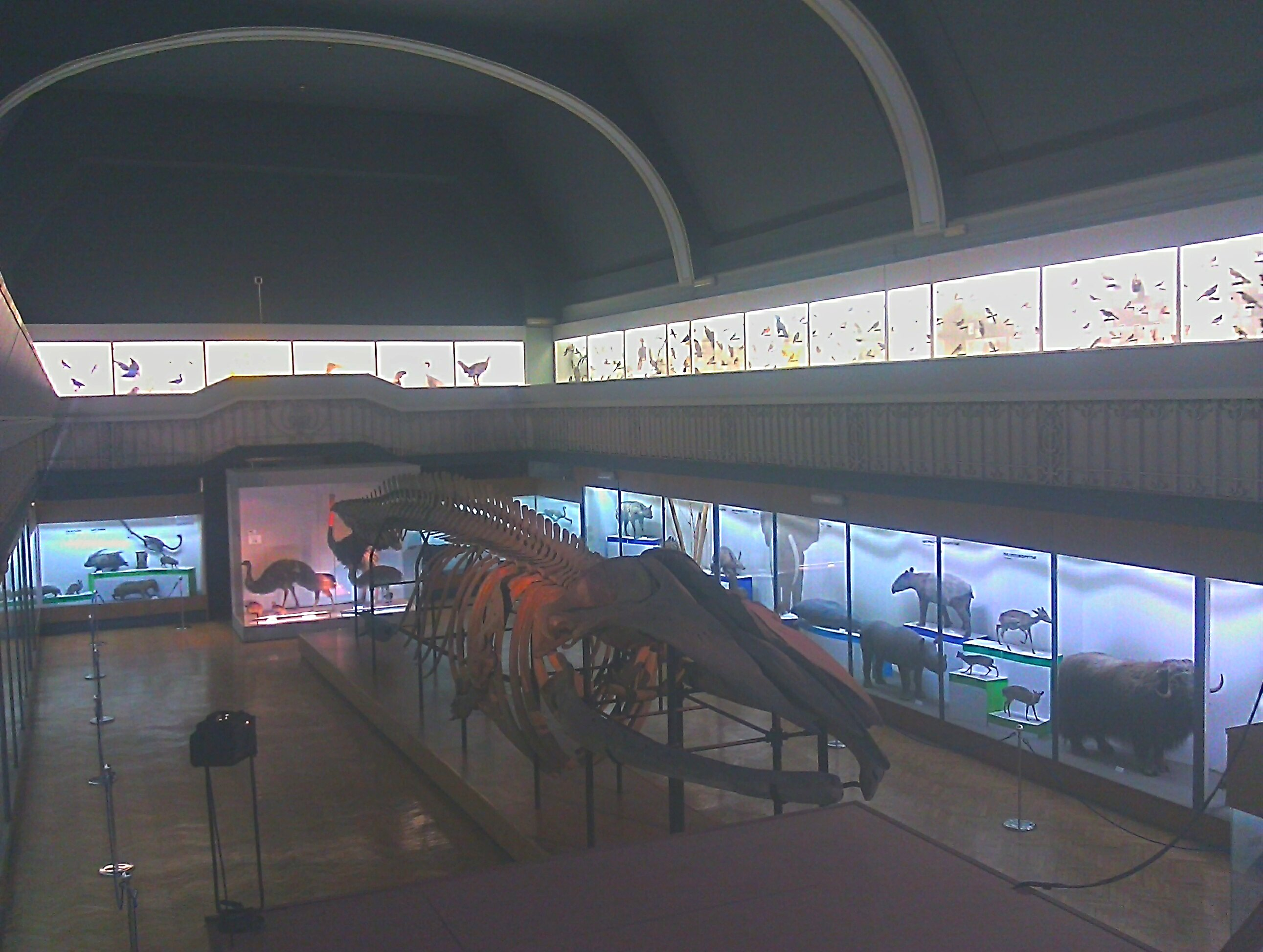
One of the exhibitions, showing a complete skeleton of a blue whale

The Museum of Natural History, University of Wrocław (Polish: Muzeum Przyrodnicze Uniwersytetu Wrocławskiego) is a large natural history museum at the University of Wrocław, in Wrocław, Poland.

The museums insect collections include:

- Friedrich Wilhelm Niepelt's collection of exotic butterflies (South America, Sunda Archipelago and tropical Africa)
- Johann Ludwig Christian Gravenhorst, Ichneumonidae
- Rudolph Dittrich, Hymenoptera
- Max Wiskott, Palaearctic Lepidoptera
- Jan Noskiewicz, Hymenoptera
- Hermann Julius Kolbe, Coleoptera
- Jadwiga Zlotorzycka, Mallophaga
- August Assmann, Hemiptera, Palaearctic Lepidoptera.
