= Alexander von Lingelsheim =

Alexander von Lingelsheim (27 September 1874, in Arolsen – 5 March 1937, in Breslau) was a German botanist and pharmacist.

He studied natural sciences at the University of Breslau, and for many years he worked as an assistant in its botanical garden and museum (1904–29). In the meantime, he received his PhD from the University of Rostock (1906) and later taught classes at the Technische Hochschule Breslau (from 1910). Together with Rudolph Dittrich and Ferdinand Albin Pax he worked also in the field of cecidology (studying plant galls) and coedited the exsiccata series Herbarium cecidiologicum. In 1929 he founded a pharmacy in Breslau, and three years later, became an associate professor of pharmacognosy at the university.

In 1909 Ferdinand Albin Pax named the botanical genus Lingelsheimia in his honor. In 1920 he became a member of the Deutsche Akademie der Naturforscher Leopoldina.

== Selected works ==
- Vorarbeiten zu einer Monographie der Gattung Fraxinus, 1907 – On the genus Fraxinus.
- Oleaceae-Oleoideae-Fraxineae und Oleaceae-Oleoideae-Syringeae, 1920 – Oleaceae-Oleoideae-Fraxineae and Oleaceae-Oleoideae-Syringeae.
