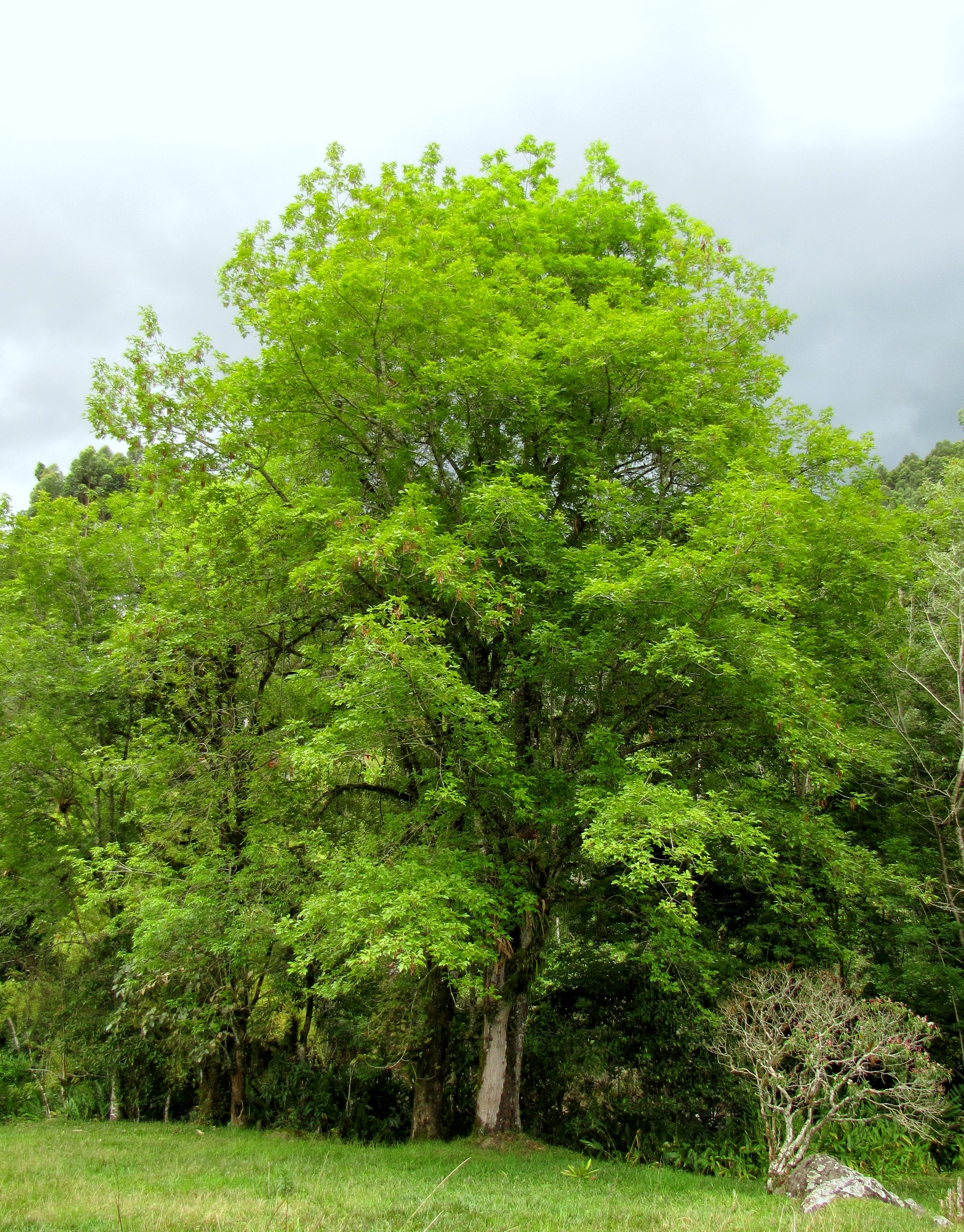

Conservation status
- Least Concern (IUCN 3.1)

Scientific classification
- Kingdom: Plantae
- Clade: Tracheophytes
- Clade: Angiosperms
- Clade: Eudicots
- Clade: Asterids
- Order: Lamiales
- Family: Oleaceae
- Genus: Fraxinus
- Section: Fraxinus sect. Melioides
- Species: F. uhdei

Binomial name
- Fraxinus uhdei (Wenz.) Lingelsh

Synonyms
- Fraxinus americana var. uhdei Wenz.; Fraxinus cavekiana Standl. & Steyerm.; Fraxinus chiapensis Lundell; Fraxinus hondurensis Standl.; Fraxinus ovalifolia (Wenz.) Lingelsh.; Fraxinus uhdei var. pseudoperiptera Lingelsh.; Fraxinus uhdei var. typica Lingelsh.

= Fraxinus uhdei =

Species of flowering plant

Fraxinus uhdei, commonly known as tropical ash or Shamel ash, is a species of tree native to Mexico and Central America. It is commonly planted as a street tree in Mexico and the southwestern United States. It has also been planted and spread from cultivation in Hawaii, where it is now considered an invasive species.

Like other species in the section Melioides, Fraxinus uhdei is dioecious, with male and female flowers produced on separate individuals.

== Taxonomy ==
The tropical ash was originally described as a variety of Fraxinus americana (white ash) by Theodor Wenzig in 1883 and was separated as a different species in 1907 by Alexander von Lingelsheim. The specific epithet uhdei refers to Carl Uhde, a German plant collector who explored Mexico in the 1840s.

Fraxinus uhdei is locally known as fresno blanco in Spanish; other English vernacular names include Hawaiian ash and Mexican ash. The name Shamel ash refers to Archie Shamel, who introduced the trees to California in the 1920s. It is known as urapan in Colombia, where it was introduced in the 1950s.

== Ecology ==
A dieback caused by a phytoplasma was recorded in Colombia and Ecuador in 2004.
