= Jan Noskiewicz =

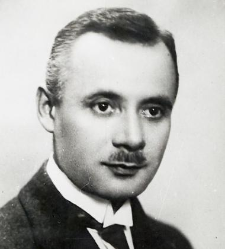
Jan Noskiewicz in c. 1935

Jan Noskiewicz (8 October 1890 – 27 August 1963) was a Polish entomologist specialising in Hymenoptera and Strepsiptera.

Noskiewicz, born in Sanok, was the son of August, a postal clerk, and Michalina. He was professor of Systematic Zoology and Zoogeography at the University of Breslau (now University of Wrocław) from 1946 – 1961. He died in Warsaw and was buried in Rembertów.

His collection of 30,000 Aculeata specimens, including holotypes, syntypes and paratypes of is in Museum of Natural History, University of Wrocław.

== Works ==
Jan Noskiewicz With G. Poluszynski. 1928. Embryologische Untersuchungen an Strepsipteren. I. Teil: Embryogenesis der Gattung Stylops Kirby. Akad. Umiejetnosci, Cl. des Sci. Math. et Nat., Bul. Internatl. Ser. B (1927): 1093-1227 (1928).
