= Paweł Kempka =

Polish lawyer, national activist, and local government official

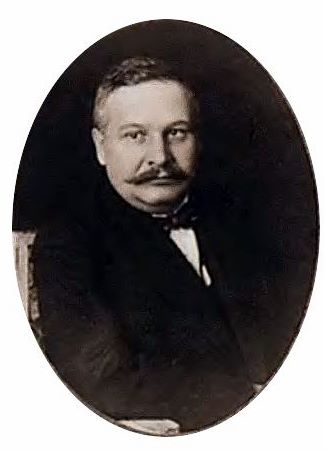
- Born: June 4, 1886; Brynów
- Died: October 29, 1972 (aged 86); Chorzów
- Resting place: St. Hedwig's cemetery in Chorzów
- Education: University of Wrocław
- Occupations: notary, lawyer, district judge, politician
- Political party: Polish Christian Democratic Party; Alliance of Democrats
- Spouse: Helena Zofia Kempka
- Children: Dobrochna Kempka, Stanisław Kempka, Maria Kempka, Franciszka Kempka
- Parents: Franciszek Kempka (father); Zofia Kempka (mother)
- Honours: Order of Polonia Restituta

Signature
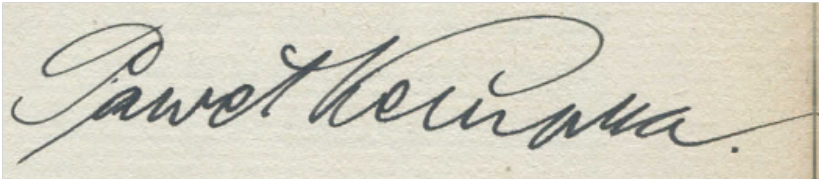

Paweł Kempka (born 4 June 1886 in Brynów, died 29 October 1972 in Chorzów) was a Polish lawyer, national activist, and local government official. He was a co-creator of the legal system of the Silesian Voivodeship, MP to the Silesian Parliament representing the Polish Christian Democratic Party, and the first president of the Alliance of Democrats in Chorzów.

== Biography ==
=== Youth and education ===
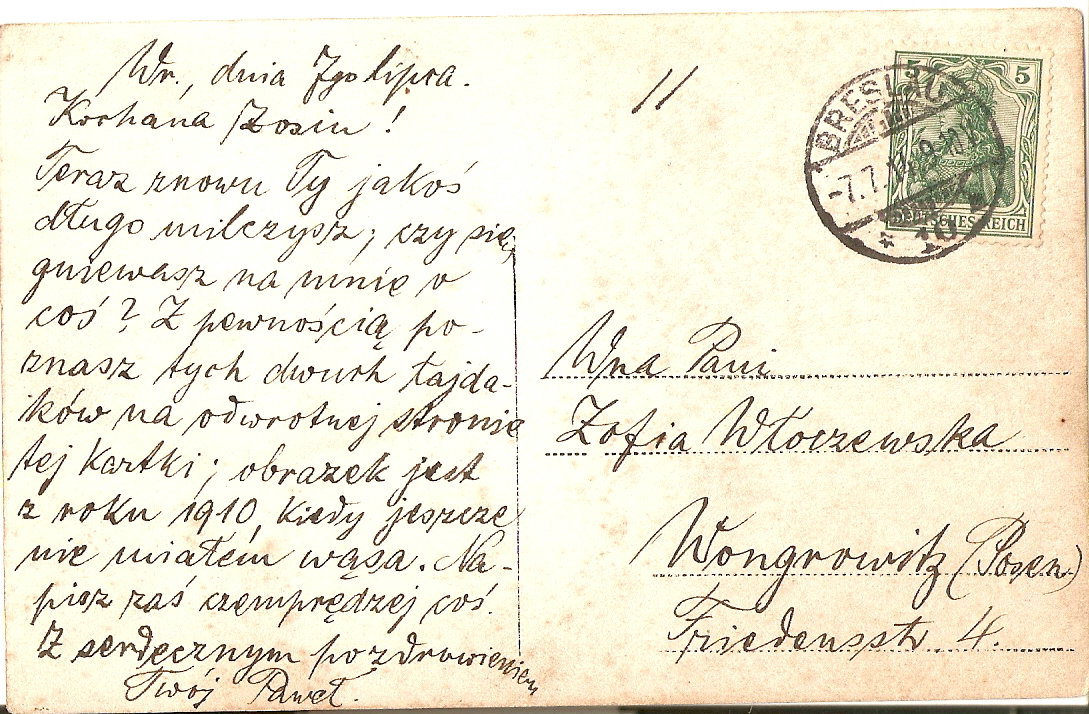
Postcard written to Helena Zofia Włoczewska during his studies in Wrocław

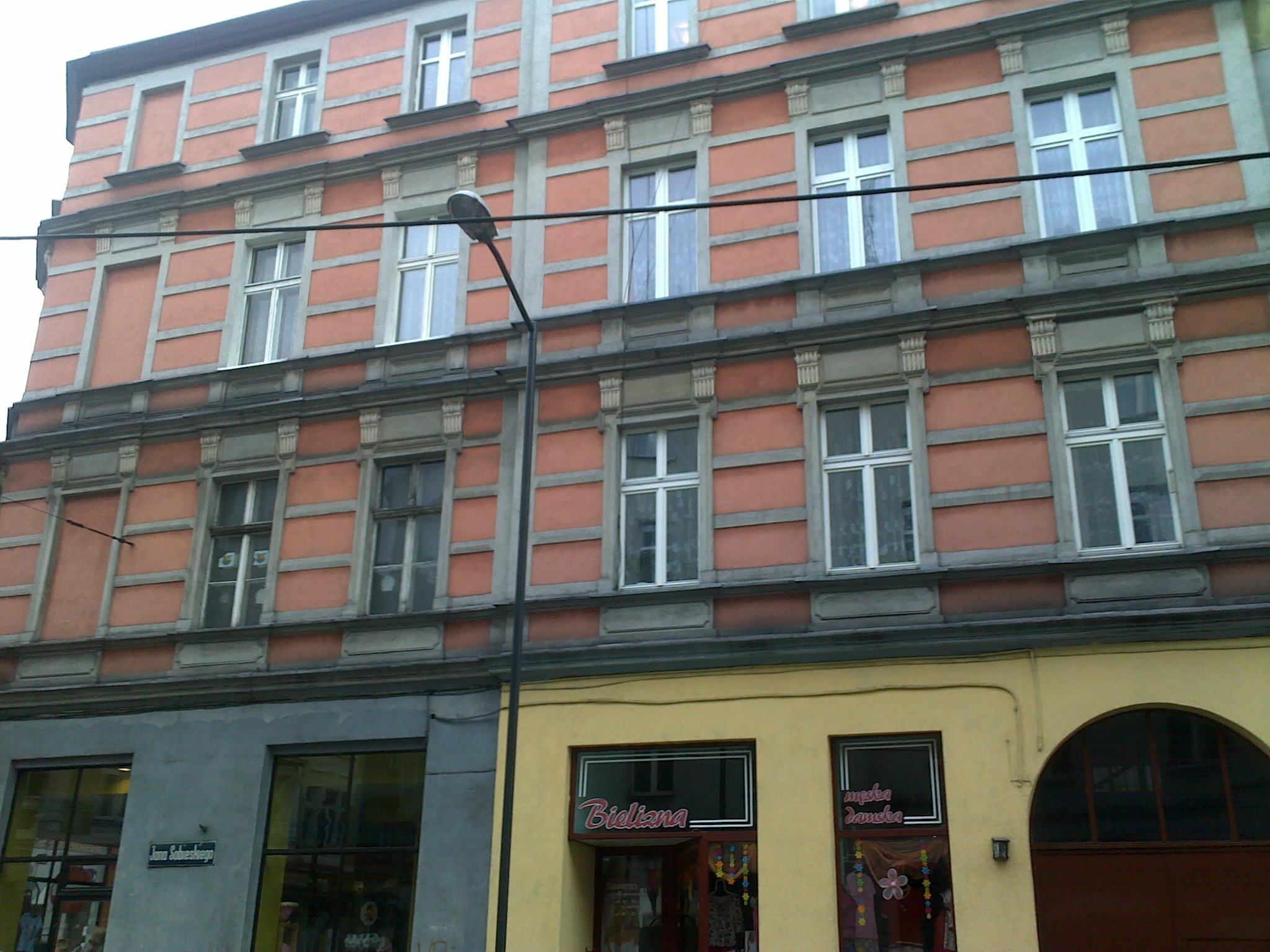
Tenement house where the Kempka family lived (Chorzów, Sobieski Street)

Paweł Kempka was born to Franciszek Kempka, a miner by profession, and Zofia (née Mildner). He was born in Brynów, now a district of Katowice, and grew up in a family with Silesian traditions.

He attended elementary school in Brynów from 1892 to 1898 and continued his education at a gymnasium in Katowice from 1899 to 1907. Kempka then studied law at the University of Wrocław between 1908 and 1913. After completing his studies, he underwent legal training from 1914 to 1916 in Bierutów and Bytom. From 1916 to 1918, he served as a deputy lawyer in Gniezno. In March 1919, he passed his assessor exam.

Officially, from 1 November 1919, he held the position of commissary mayor of Gniezno. However, from March 16, he personally signed all documents, even though Zygmunt Rabski was still formally the mayor. Kempka stepped down from the mayoral position on 3 March 1920. According to other sources, he had been in this role since 11 June 1917.

=== Activities during the Silesian Uprisings ===
In March 1920, Kempka returned to Upper Silesia and moved with his family to Katowice. From 1 March 1920 to 1 May 1921, he worked at the Polish Plebiscite Commission in Bytom as the head of the Administrative Department. During this time, he began collaborating with Wojciech Korfanty and joined the Polish Christian Democratic Party. During the Third Silesian Uprising, he served as the head of civil administration in the Polish Plebiscite Commission. He was a member of the eight-person Self-Government Commission of the Polish Plebiscite Commission, tasked with developing the legal system for Silesian Voivodeship. His responsibilities included tax and administrative matters. At Korfanty's request, Kempka became the delegate of the Polish Plebiscite Commission in Warsaw and was authorized to enter into agreements with the central government. He arrived in the capital around 7 July 1920. During this period, he conducted negotiations with Deputy Minister of Finance Roman Rybarski, accepting proposed financial solutions that were to be legislatively regulated under the organic statute. On 5 July 1921, Kempka was appointed an official in the Administrative Department of the Supreme People's Council in Katowice. On 6 February 1922, he was appointed a presidential official of this body. He ceased his role as head of the Administrative and Self-Government Department on 7 August 1922. Subsequently, he served as a senior provincial counselor, responsible for preparing the organization of two departments of the Silesian Provincial Office: Public Safety and Public Works, and Self-Government.

=== Member of the Silesian Parliament ===
In July 1922, Kempka moved with his family to Pszczyna, where he worked as a lawyer. On 24 September 1922, he was elected to the Silesian Parliament from the Katowice electoral district. He is considered one of the most active members of the Polish Christian Democratic Party in the Silesian Parliament. Kempka worked in various parliamentary committees: agrarian, control (which he chaired), legislative, housing, national minorities, special, and cooperative committees.

He was re-elected to the second term of the Silesian Parliament on 11 May 1930 from the Królewska Huta electoral district. Out of 10 sessions, he missed only one. During this time, he was a member of the administrative and self-government committee and vice-chairman of the legal and electoral committees. On 23 November 1930, he was re-elected from the same electoral district. Kempka chaired three parliamentary committees: the extraordinary constitutional committee, the special committee for parceling, and the rules committee. He was also vice-chairman of the electoral committee and secretary of the legal committee and the special committee for settlements between the Silesian treasury and the national treasury. He also served on the committee for religious denominations and public enlightenment. Kempka held his parliamentary seat until 26 March 1935, at the end of the third term of the Silesian Parliament.

Kempka also engaged in local government activities in Tarnowskie Góry. In May 1924, he moved to this city, serving as a city councilor and chairman of the city council from 1926 to 1931. His tenure in local government ended in 1931 after the Sanation authorities deprived him of his notarial office in 1930.

In 1931, he moved to Królewska Huta (now Chorzów) and worked as a lawyer and notary until the outbreak of World War II, after which he solely practiced as a notary.

=== World War II period ===
In the early days of the occupation, Kempka was imprisoned by German forces as a hostage. During World War II, he refused to sign the Deutsche Volksliste, resulting in the loss of his notarial office and all his property. During an interrogation, a German officer persistently tried to persuade him to sign the Volksliste, pointing out his German-sounding name. However, Paweł Kempka refused. During the conversation, he remarked that although he did not know Mickiewicz, Słowacki, and other Polish national poets very well, since he did not learn about them in the German school, he would nonetheless quote a passage from the German poet Goethe. It was a fragment that stated one does not choose their homeland, but rather, one carries it in their heart. The German officer abandoned further attempts. Paweł Kempka narrowly avoided being sent to a concentration camp. The German labor office assigned him to the Grundstückgesellschaft (a company managing real estate) in Katowice as a legal advisor.

=== Post-War period ===
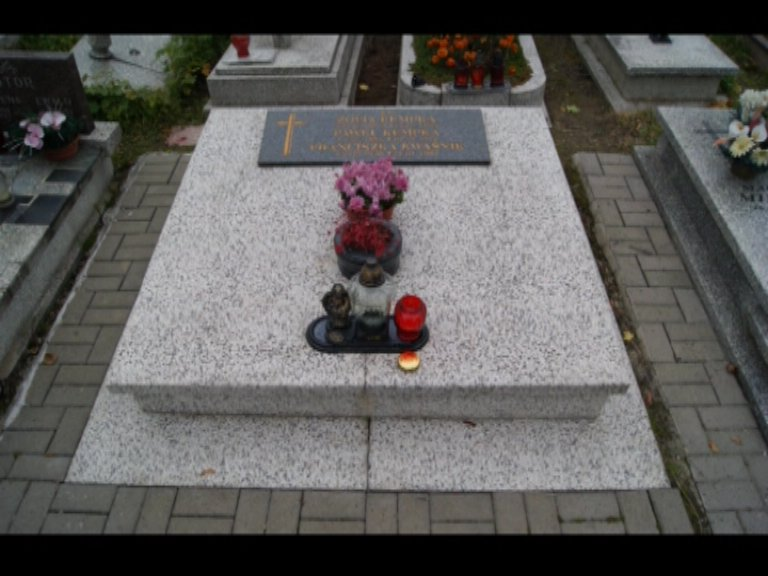
Grave of Paweł Kempka

After the liberation of Chorzów, Kempka worked as a city councilor. He reopened his notarial office in August 1945. In 1951, he was appointed a notary at the State Notary Office in Chorzów. In February 1945, Kempka founded the local circle of the Alliance of Democrats and became its first president. He also worked at the National Bank of Poland, served as a district judge, and was president of the Association of Private Property Owners. Kempka was buried at St. Jadwiga's Cemetery in Chorzów.

Kempka and other former members of Christian Democracy living in Chorzów were monitored under the codename 1 by the authorities from 19 September 1945 due to suspicions of anti-communist sentiments. In late 1945, Kempka's activities reflected a mix of post-war enthusiasm and hope for social changes, alongside fear of the new regime and its repressive measures. This led to the election of Roman Grabianowski as the new chairman of the Chorzów circle of the Alliance of Democrats on 18 November 1945, with Kempka remaining on the board until mid-1948 and later serving on the Audit Committee until 1955. In the 1960s, Kempka was visited by Jerzy Jóźwiak. During their conversations, Kempka showed great interest in the activities of the Alliance of Democrats, reminiscing about its early days after the liberation of Chorzów from Nazi occupation. He spoke fondly of his colleagues and the enthusiasm and hope people had for regained independence, while lamenting the later oppressive political system, especially during the Stalinist era.

== Political views ==
Paweł Kempka was a proponent of Silesia's return to Poland and a co-author and defender of Silesian Voivodeship. In the Silesian Parliament, he defended the rights of the poorest population. He advocated for the enactment of a Silesian constitution, the unification of Silesia with Poland, and the regulation of administrative practices to protect Silesian officials. He opposed Michał Grażyński and Józef Piłsudski.

After World War II, he opposed the renewal of the Labour Faction's activities because he was against the fragmentation of democratic groups.

== Private life ==
Paweł Kempka was a friend of Wojciech Korfanty. In 1919, he married Helena Zofia Włoczewska, and the couple had four children: Dobrochna (a pharmacist), Stanisław (an architect), Maria (a master of Polish philology), and Franciszka (a Germanist). Wojciech Korfanty was the godfather of Stanisław. During the war, Dobrochna and Stanisław were deported for forced labor in Germany, Maria was forced to work in a factory, and 14-year-old Franciszka worked as a domestic helper.

== Orders and decorations ==
On 2 May 1923, he received the Knight's Cross of the Order of Polonia Restituta, and on 16 July 1965, he was awarded the Officer's Cross of the Order of Polonia Restituta. However, he did not want to wear the latter, as it was given by the communist authorities, and he valued the pre-war order more. During the ceremony, the Officer's Cross was presented to him by Jan Grzbiela, who in 1939 was the mayor of Tarnowskie Góry and the commander of the city's defense. During World War II, Grzbiela was active in the Home Army and was appointed voivode of Opole by the emigrant government. After the war, he joined the Alliance of Democrats.

== Commemoration ==
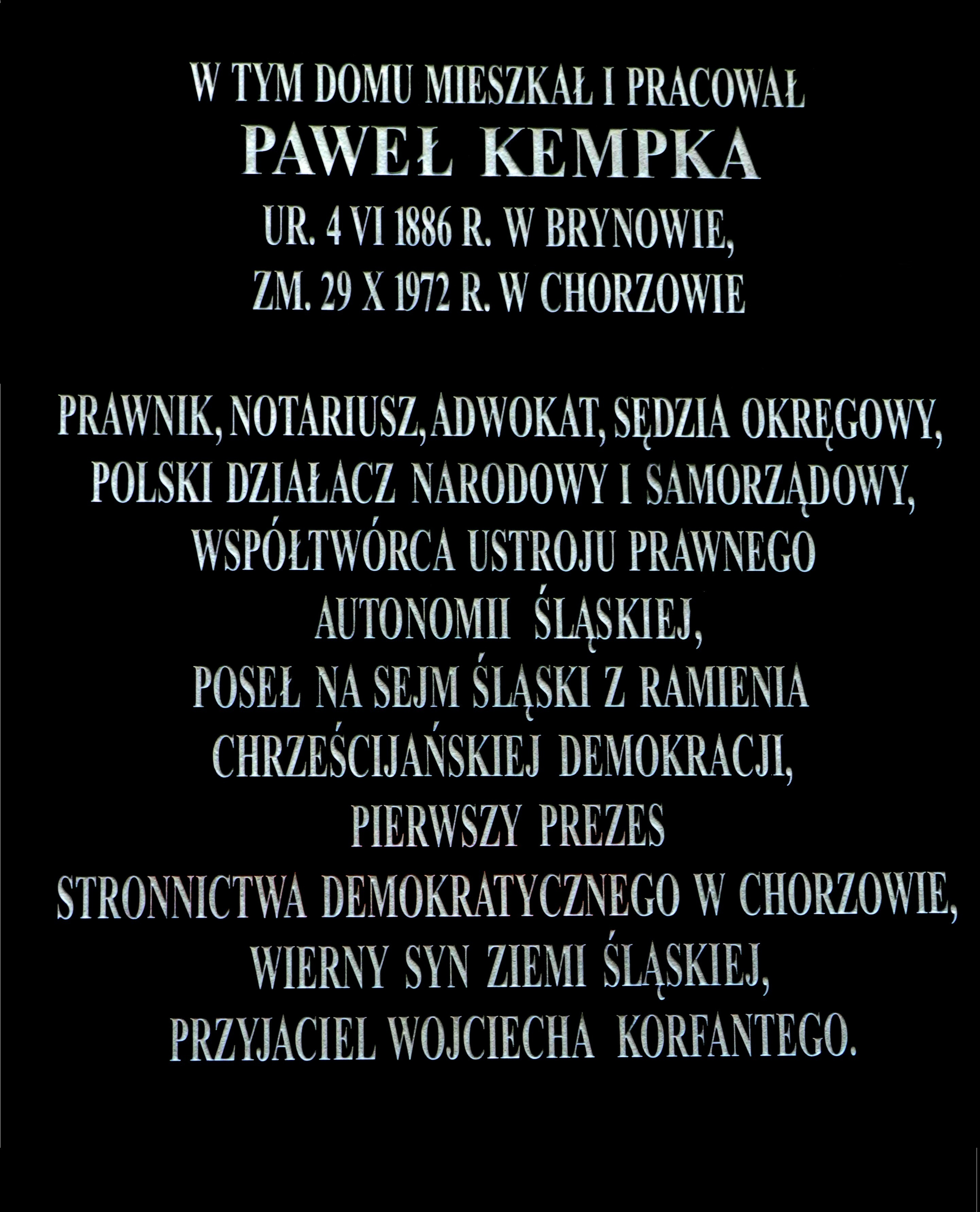
Plaque dedicated to the memory of Paweł Kempka placed on the building of a tenement house on Sobieski Street in Chorzów

In 1988, the Polish Post in Chorzów issued a commemorative postmark featuring Paweł Kempka: Paweł Kempka – first president of the Alliance of Democrats in Chorzów.

On the 40th anniversary of Paweł Kempka's death, the Chorzów Enthusiasts Association, along with Kempka's family, organized a socio-cultural event titled Paweł Kempka – we remember. As part of the event, a plaque was unveiled on the building at 1 Sobieski Street in Chorzów, where Kempka lived and worked, and a commemorative postmark was issued to mark the occasion.

In 2021, the Silesian Uprisings Film Encyclopedia produced a short documentary film titled Paweł Kempka – a deputy from Królewska Huta.

== Bibliography ==
- Marcoń, Witold (2011). Paweł Kempka - szkic do portretu. Zeszyty Tarnogórskie (in Polish). Tarnowskie Góry: Instytut Tarnogórski. ISBN 978-83-87470-37-1.
