= Waldemar Kozuschek =

German-Polish surgeon (1930–2009)

Waldemar Kozuschek (10 May 1930 – 10 August 2009) was a German-Polish surgeon and professor, who performed the first kidney transplant in Poland.

== Early life and education ==
Kozuschek was born in 1930 in Gleiwitz, Weimar Germany (Gliwice, Poland). He did his medical studies at the Faculty of Medicine of the University of Wrocław, studying surgery under Wiktor Brossa and nephrology under Zdzisław Wiktor. He graduated from Wrocław University and its Medical Academy in 1954. He then worked at the Municipal Hospital under Julian Czerwiakowski, in the same city, specializing in general surgery. Ten years later, Kozuschek obtained his Ph.D. from the same alma mater, which was followed by habilitation in 1970 at the Silesian Medical Academy in Katowice.

== Career ==
Kozuschek and his family left the Polish People's Republic and immigrated to West Germany, where, by 1972, he found a position at the University of Bonn. He worked there at first as an assistant professor and eventually was promoted to the deputy head of the Department of Surgery. From 1975 to 1996, Kozuschek worked at first as associate professor at the Ruhr University Bochum and in 1978 was promoted to full professor. He then became the head of the University's Hospital and between 1982 and 1985 served as vice dean and dean of the Faculty of Medicine as well as a member of the university senate from 1983 to 1989. Kozuschek joined Surgery Clinic in Bochum in 1993 in which he founded an internationally known organ transplant center, which was the first one where kidney and liver transplants were performed side-by-side with pancreatic cancer studies.

During his career, Kozuschek had collaborated with the University of Strasbourg, Nice and Windhoek as well as Wrocław University of Environmental and Life Sciences and Wrocław Medical University. He is known for the first kidney transplant in Poland that happened in 1965 as well as successful kidney transplant operation on a living donor in 1966. He was also a co-founder of the German-Polish Society of the University of Wrocław.

He died in Bochum, Germany.
