= Ruth Baum =

Jewish Polish-Israeli writer and journalist (1922–2022)

- רות באום
- Ruth Baum
- Born: December 26, 1922; Warsaw, Poland
- Died: February 22, 2022 (aged 99); Haifa, Israel
- Education: University of Wrocław
- Occupations: Writer and Journalist
- Writing career
- Language: Polish

Ruth Baum (Hebrew: רות באום; 26 December 1922 – 22 February 2022) was a Jewish Polish-Israeli writer and journalist.

== Biography ==
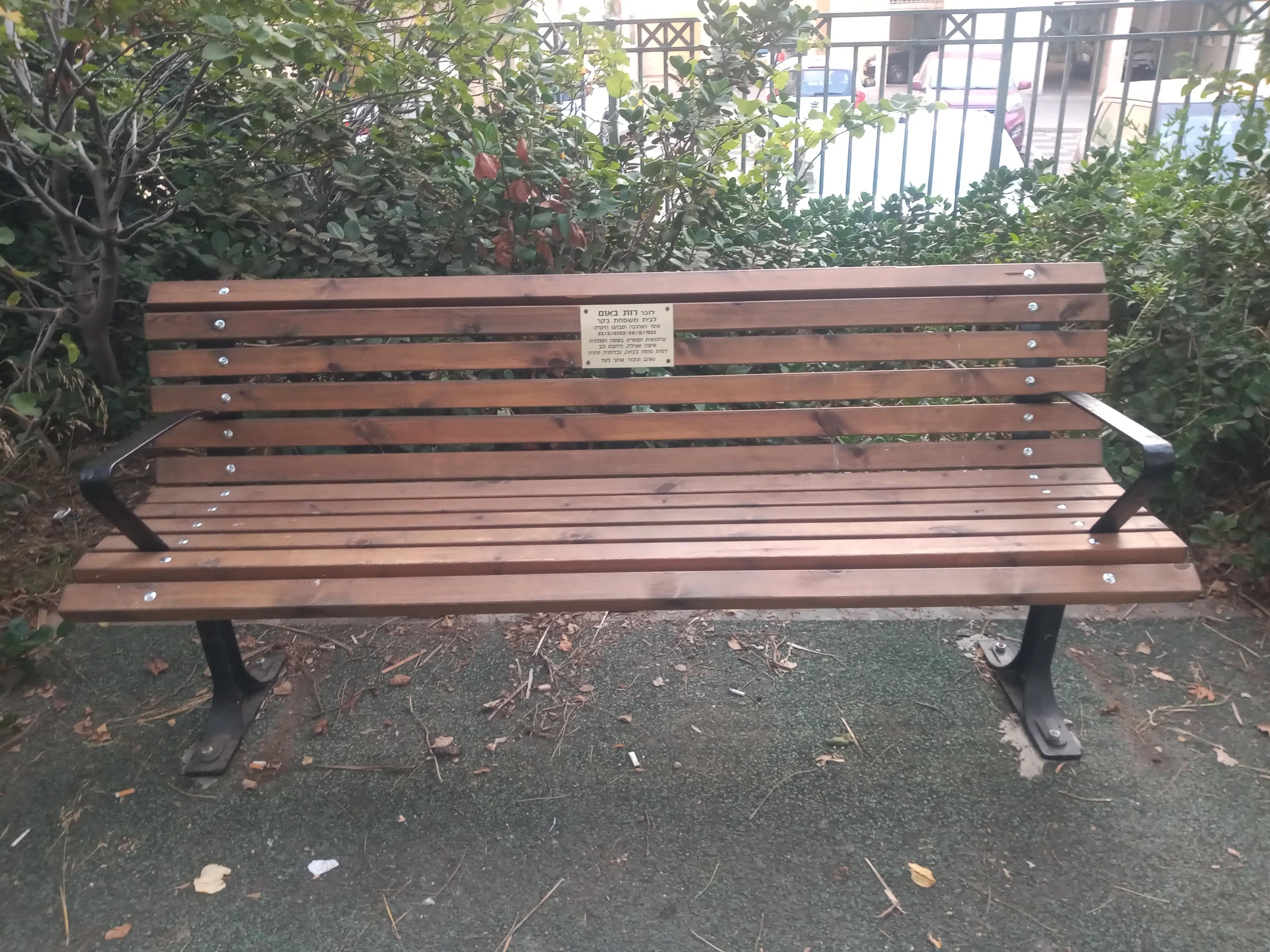
Park bench in her memory in Haifa, Israel

She was born on 26 December 1922, in Warsaw, Poland, to the Becker family.

In 1937, she started publishing stories in the children's newspaper "Mały Przegląd", a supplement of Nasz Przeglad edited by Janusz Korczak

During the Second World War she escaped to the USSR, where she worked in the mines as well as a translator in a German prison camp near Orsk. In addition, she started to publish short stories, translated to Russian, about her school experiences.

After the war she returned to Wrocław, where she studied literature and Polish philosophy at the University of Wrocław. She was a collaborator of the Polish Radio in Wrocław and the Fołks Sztyme weekly.

Baum felt conflicted staying in Poland after the war and decided to emigrate to Israel in 1957. She had trouble adapting to Hebrew and continued to write and work in the Polish language. She was a member of the Association of Polish Authors in Israel, and published stories and books in the Polish language.

During her time in Israel she wrote in the Polish newspaper Nowiny-Kurier, which was published in Israel, as well as the Contori magazine. Her stories were also published in Hebrew newspapers and she wrote four books.

Baum died on February 22, 2022, in Haifa, Israel. A typewriter is depicted on her gravestone, to show the invention that had the most impact on her life.

== Books ==
Books written by Baum (in Polish):

- "Unromantic Life: Stories" (Życie nieromantyczne : opowiadania) (1974)
- "The Thirteenth month: A Novel" (Trzynasty miesiąc roku : powieść) (1977)
- "The Heir's and other stories" (Syn dziedzica i inne opowiadania) (1999)
- "The Garden on the volcano" Ogród na wulkanie (2007)

Her stories also appear in "Portraits in Literature: The Jews of Poland, An Anthology"
