= Polipoli Spring State Recreation Area =

State park in Hawaii, United States

Coordinates: 20°40′50″N 156°19′57″W

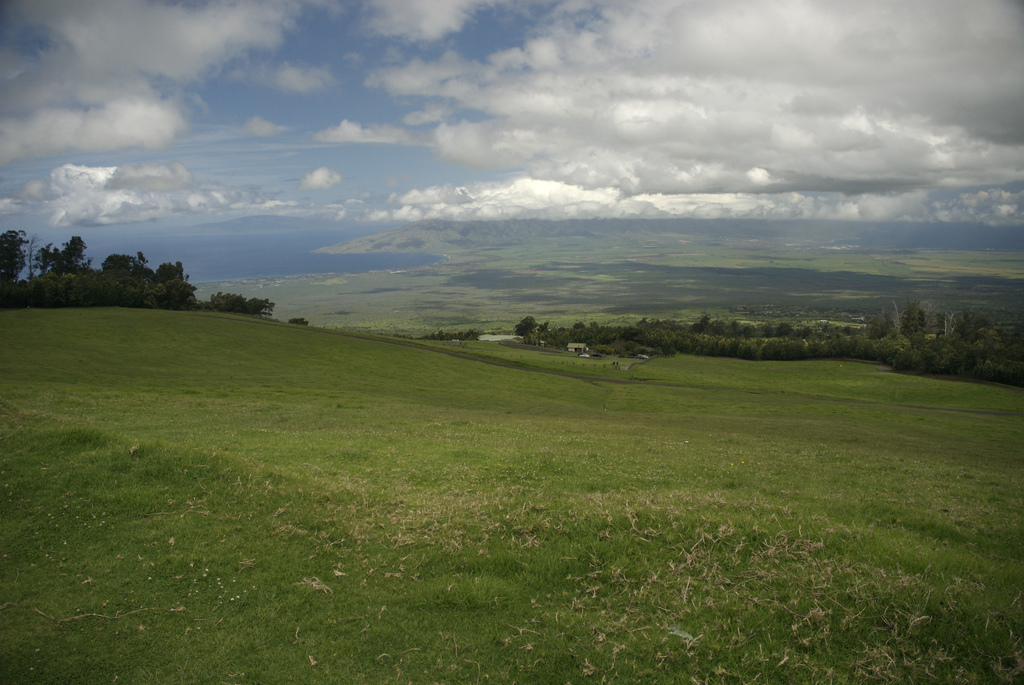
View down to Kihei, Maalaea, and windward Maui from the entrance to the park

The Polipoli Spring State Recreation Area is a state park of Hawaiʻi in the United States. It is on the island of Maui about ten miles from Kula up the slope of Haleakalā.

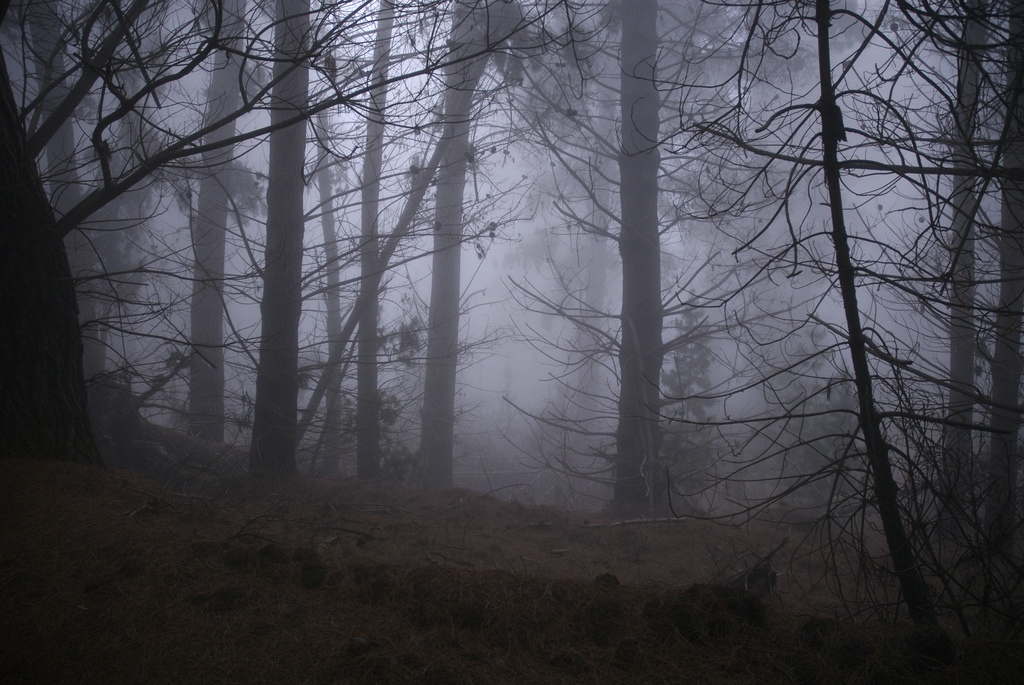
Humidity in the park can at times be exceptional

It covers about 10 acres of the 21,000-acre (85 km^{2}) Kula Forest Reserve. Located at about 6,200 feet (1,900 m) above sea level, it extends through the fog belt of the mountain forests. The high-elevation climate can be cold, with nighttime temperatures below freezing. The terrain is rough and use of a four-wheel drive vehicle is recommended.

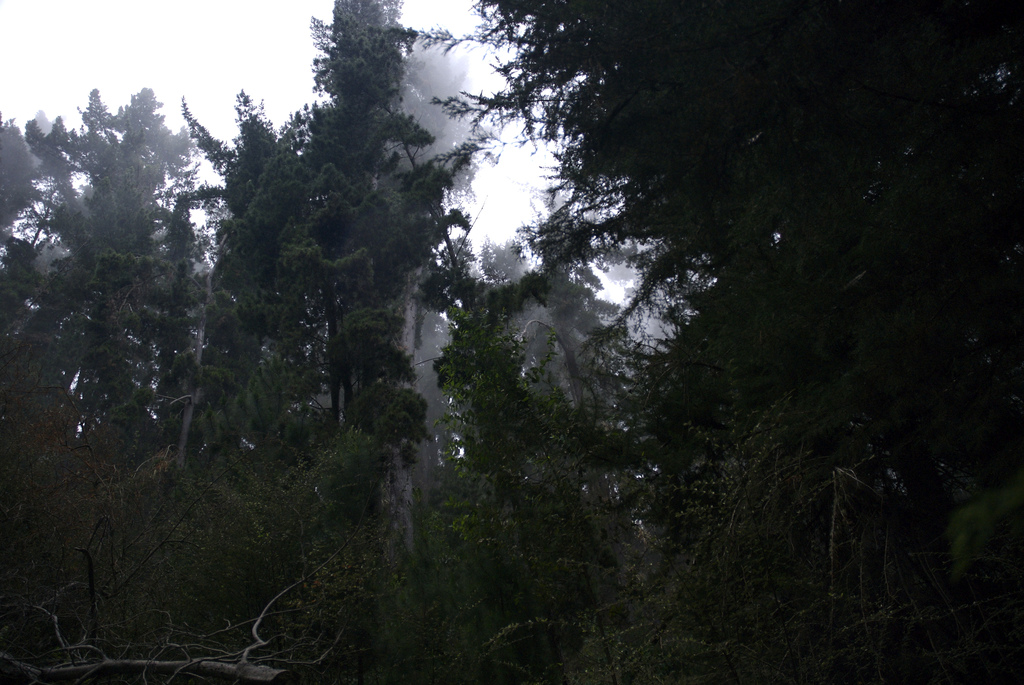
Very tall, non-native trees dominate the landscape, especially at higher elevations

There are four main trails. The Haleakalā Ridge Trail enters the recreation area. It features scrub, grassland, and forest habitat with cinder substrates. The adjacent Plum Trail is planted with plum and other trees. The Polipoli Trail, which starts within the recreation area, features various conifers. The Redwood Trail is used for mountain biking. Visitors can view redwoods and an old ranger's cabin.

The area was originally covered in dense forests of koa (Acacia koa), māmane (Sophora chrysophylla), and ʻōhiʻa lehua (Metrosideros polymorpha). When the park was established, it was devoid of trees and was subsequently reforested in the 1930s with pines, eucalyptus, tropical ash, cypress, China-fir, and coast redwood.

Activities in the park include off-roading, hiking, and hunting for wild boar and feral goats.
