= Rudolph Dittrich =

German entomologist

Rudolph Dittrich (23 December 1850 in Breslau – 19 December 1922 in Breslau) was a German entomologist specialising in Coleoptera and Hymenoptera. His Hymenoptera collection is in the Museum of Natural History Wroclaw University.

Dittrich worked also in the field of cecidology (studying plant galls) and edited the exsiccata work Herbarium cecidiologicum together with Ferdinand Albin Pax and later with F.A. Pax and Alexander von Lingelsheim.

== Works ==
Partial List

- Verzeichnis der bisher in Schlesien aufgefunden Hymenopteren. I. Apidae. Zeitschr. Entom. N.F (Breslau) 28: 19-54 (1903)
- Hymenopterologische Bemerkungen. III. Ein Beitrag zum Wirtzeichnis derIchneumoniden. Jahresh. Schles. Insektenkunde.2,38-46 (1909)
- Verzeichnis der bisher in Schlesien aufgefunden Hymenopteren. III. Rapacia. Jahr. Ver. Schles. Ins. Breslau, 4: 15-34
- Verzeichnis der bisher in Schlesien aufgefunden Hymenopteren. I. Apidae. Zeitschr. Entom. N.F (Breslau) 28: 19-54 (1911)
- Chalicodoma muraria F. in einem Steinbuch der Umgegend von Frankenstein. Jahr. Ver. Schles. Ins. Breslau, 14: 6
- Verzeichnis der bisher in Schlesien aufgefunden Hymenopteren. I. Apidae. Zeitschr. Entom. N.F (Breslau) 28: 19-54 (1924)
