= Siegmund Hadda =

German surgeon and physician

Siegmund Hadda (1882-1977) was a Jewish-German surgeon and chief physician at the Jewish Hospital in Breslau (now Wrocław) during the rise of the Nazi Regime. During the Nazi Regime, he and his family were in serious danger. In 1938/39 all his attempts to get a visa for a country of asylum failed in spite of his award during World War I, his good relationship with the church and foreign contacts. However, despite all the misfortune and their incarceration in the concentration camp Theresienstadt, he and his wife were among the few Jews who were redeemed at the last moment by Switzerland.

== Early life and education ==
Hadda was born in the Prussian garrison town Cosel in 1882 to parents of Jewish faith. They operated a restaurant and sold sewing machines in Oberschlesien. Hadda's life was greatly influenced by physician Professor Johann von Mikulitz when he treated Hadda's father, inspiring Hadda to become a doctor.

In 1901, Hadda began his medical studies at the University of Wrocław where his teachers were students of Mikulicz: Alexander Tietze, Reinbach, Ferdinand Sauerbruch and Gottstein.

== Career ==
=== Jewish Hospital in Breslau ===
In 1906, Gottstein became head of the Surgical Department at the Jewish Hospital and hired Hadda. The hospital re-opened in 1903/04 in a new building spurred on by the Jewish fraternity Chevra kadisha. The Jewish fraternity helped fill in gaps of the Jewish social net that were removed by the Edict of Tolerance of Emperor Josef ll in 1781. During his tenure, Hadda published more than 40 scientific papers and witnessed surgeries that have gone down in history, such as the Foerster's operation (performed by Otfrid Foerster), a treatment for spastic paralysis by resection of spinal roots. He also worked with many notable doctors including Carl Fried, Ludwig Guttmann and Otfrid Foerster. During his holidays, Hadda visited different clinics abroad like Paris in 1909 and London in 1910. In 1912 he met, among others, Alexis Carrel, the founder of vascular surgery and later a Nobel Laureate, in the United States. He was also a guest at the Mayo Clinic.

In the years following World War I, he had a stable working environment at the Jewish Hospital and became head of the surgical department. Hadda left the institution in 1943 when it was dissolved due to the Nazi Regime and the rise of anti-Semitism.

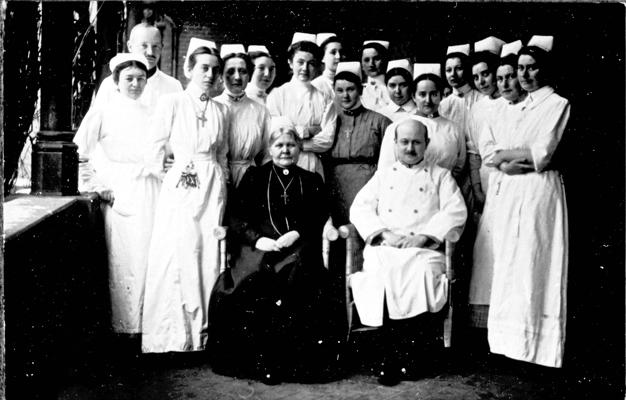
Dr Siegmund Hadda and staff nurses at the Jewish hospital, Breslau

=== World War I ===
In the years during World War I, Hadda became head of two military hospitals and received awards. He had to hide his pacifist outlook so as not to stand out as a nonconformist. He described the serious injuries of his patients, for example, the gaseous gangrene infections against which there was a feeling of helplessness. In the early autumn of 1917, he elucidated to the malnutrition of the civilian population resulting in susceptibility to infections like the influenza epidemic.

== World War II ==
=== The Nazi Government and the Jewish Hospital ===
Events that were specifically recognized by Hadda as turning points:

- Hitler's March to the Feldherrnhalle in Munich, 1933; this first gave the impression of an unsuccessful copy of Mussolini's March on Rome.
- The surprising growth of the NSDAP as the second strongest party in September 1930.
- The failure of 3 Chancellors in the economic crisis and their fatal proposal to the President to appoint Hitler as Chancellor.

A quote by Hadda about the last point: “The black day of Germany on 30 January 1933...from which we are still suffering the after-effects today...Hindenburg...had confirmed Hitler as Chancellor, ...."

About Hitler's speech that day Hadda said: "Unfortunately, I didn’t foresee what the consequences of this speech would be because I was still trusting in the decency of the German people, with whom I was born and grew up. It is inconceivable for me even today, how quickly the great majority of the German people were able to fall under the influence of the mass hypnosis of Nazism.”

In 1934 as a result of the school board's hurried obedience to the Nazi Party, Hadda's daughter Lotte was forced to leave the school she was attending. She was able to go to another school but according to the testimony of her classmate B. Grenzow, she also had difficulties there which made it partly hard for her to graduate. In the previous year a friend of Hadda's son had been killed and the offender was released from prison shortly after. Not only did such arbitrary acts as these horrify Hadda but also the parallel suspension of the fundamental rights embellished with the “ordinance for the protection of People and State”.

As a matter of fact, the Jewish Hospital was able to do something against this new threat. As early as 1933 it hired doctors who had been dismissed from other hospitals. In 1935 Hadda became head of surgery in a completely normal way. The outer threatening world was able to be shielded by an inner world of family, community, school friends, classmates, colleagues and grateful patients. This shield of protection must have been extraordinarily strong. Even more than his colleague Fried, Hadda repeatedly took refuge in the notion that, “the worst is over; it can't get worse than this.”

According to Professor Abraham Ascher in his book 'A Community under Siege - the Jews of Breslau under Nazism "Had it not been for Siegmund Hadda, the Jewish Hospital of Breslau, one of the two most prized achievements of the Jewish community, would probably not have remained open for as long as it did, until well into1943".

=== Searching for ways of escape ===
So it wasn't until 1938 that Hadda tried to apply for a visa for himself and his wife to visit England, however, out of a sense of duty he changed his mind again. Many Jewish citizens were deported to the Buchenwald concentration camp during an arrest campaign in June 1938. These arrests took place before the Pogrom night (“night of broken glass”) 8-10. November 38.

Doctor Hadda was so busy looking after those who had injuries, intestinal disorders or other internal damage after their dismissal from a four-week imprisonment that he postponed the planning of his own departure. Reassuring himself he wrote, “the idea that such crimes would be repeated and eventually carried out systematically and regularly still seemed so unlikely to me.”

It was still possible for Hadda to drive to England that same August in 1938. There he was able – as he writes – to obtain legal entry for his children, even though he was not able to for himself. At the very same time the family lost their own house through a forced sale.

It wasn't until after all these events that the Pogrom night took place. This entailed renewed deportations to Buchenwald (Carl Fried was among those deported, Hadda witnessed his arrest). Most Jewish doctors lost their license to practice on 1 October 1938 (Hadda was one of the few exceptions). Their passports were taken away from them starting on 26 October.

Hadda drove to Berlin a few days after the Pogrom night. He wasn't able to even get an admittance pass at the US and British embassies. Being the honest person he was, he refused a bribe offer. He then tried to at least obtain the existing entry permits for his children, he succeeded, but with dramatic obstacles.

The pressure, which the two colleagues Hadda and Fried were suffering under, must have become so extreme for Fried, because of his experience in the concentration camp, that he and his wife no longer had any doubt about leaving the country even under the worst conditions. All head physicians of the Jewish Hospital except for Hadda were allowed to leave the country at the last minute.

=== Deportation to Theresienstadt ===
The clinic continued to operate under Hadda's leadership up to the eviction order on 31 August 1939. At that time unimaginable scenes were occurring. Hadda remained active, despite countless harassments and repeated removals of the gravely ill. His brother Moritz, the architect, was murdered. Hadda and his wife were among the last 18 Jews deported from Breslau/Wrocław to Theresienstadt. This former fortification was a transit camp for the annihilation of Jews but also for those who were not yet supposed to be murdered.

There were always small glimmers of hope for him and he was able to be used in his profession. Only some of the few remaining doctors were granted this privilege. He was even able to visit a Jewish worship service. He described the problems that the inmates had because of malnutrition “Because everyone suffered greatly from hunger.” Poor diet resulted in avitaminosis especially vitamin D deficiency: osteomalacia; “Sufferers who were unable to stand up.” X-rays showed the so-called “transformation zones” as described and named after Looser (Zurich) in 1920. The so-called ‘Milkman Syndrome’ describes the symmetrical manifestation. A special arrangement for package deliveries had been made between the Danish King and the Gestapo and these packages also contained urgently needed vitamins.

When Hadda wrote about the horrors of the prison camp, he told about his experience in having to face Mr. Eichmann once again, as the entire medical profession had to come before him in 1944. “Springer (chief surgeon at the main hospital) and I were the last two doctors in line because we were arranged according to rank and job. In front of us one doctor after the other was sentenced to Auschwitz, according to the list lying in front of Eichmann. After answering Eichmann’s question that I had been working in the main hospital he said, ‘Go back to work and tell Springer he can also go back.’ - The number of internees shrunk considerably in early 1945.

=== The Liberation ===
Then on 3 February 1945 something incredible happened. Hadda heard the rumor that transportation to Switzerland was being organised by the Swiss government. The suspicion was so great that the offer of liberation was yet another Nazi act of cruelty and that the trains would go to Auschwitz instead that only 1650 of 6000 invited candidates actually registered to board the trains. After leaving Theresienstadt the carriages travelled via Eger and Nuremberg and reached Kreuzlingen, Switzerland. Hadda later found out that Himmler and the Swiss Federal Council future had agreed to arrange for future transportation from the camp but that Hitler put a stop to the plan.

He was soon able to live with his wife again and pursue his profession. Because his licences to practice in Germany were not acceptable to the Swiss authorities, he had to start over once again as a junior doctor. After a one-year stay in Switzerland, the Haddas were able to travel to the USA via England. He overcame a considerable amount of bureaucratic hurdles in New York and was able to work as a doctor there until his 77th birthday. He survived his wife, who died in 1970, and lived until the age of 95.

His colleague Carl Fried travelled back to Germany once again in 1956. He spoke little about his time under the Nazi regime. Currently we only know that he described his feelings and impressions in poems exclusively. But they are written with impressive clarity

Siegmund Hadda never visited Germany again and explained why he didn't want to be on German soil anymore, “I would suspect every man middle-aged or older to be the possible murderer of my loved ones.”

== Personal life ==
He married in 1914 and had 3 children, George, Eva, Lotte. In 1977, he died in New York, where he worked in his own practice.
