= University of Wrocław =

Public university in Wrocław, Poland

Coordinates: 51°6′49″N 17°2′0″E

- Uniwersytet Wrocławski
- Latin: Universitas Wratislaviensis
- Former names: German: Leopoldina, Universität Breslau, Schlesische Friedrich-Wilhelms-Universität zu Breslau (before 1945)
- Type: Public
- Established: 21 October 1702; 323 years ago (reorganised 1945)
- President: Robert Olkiewicz
- Administrative staff: 3,569
- Students: 20,293 (12.2023)
- Location: Wrocław, Lower Silesian Voivodeship, Poland
- Campus: Urban
- Colors: Blue
- Website: uwr.edu.pl

The University of Wrocław (Polish: Uniwersytet Wrocławski, UWr; Latin: Universitas Wratislaviensis) is a public research university in Wrocław, Poland. It is the largest institution of higher learning in the Lower Silesian Voivodeship, with over 100,000 graduates since 1945, including some 1,900 researchers, among whom many have received the highest awards for their contributions to the development of scientific scholarship.

The university was established in 1701 and reconstituted in its current form in 1945, as a direct successor to the previous German University of Breslau. Following the territorial changes of Poland's borders, academics primarily from the Jan Kazimierz University of Lwów restored the university building, which had been heavily damaged in the 1945 Battle of Breslau.

== History ==
=== Leopoldina ===
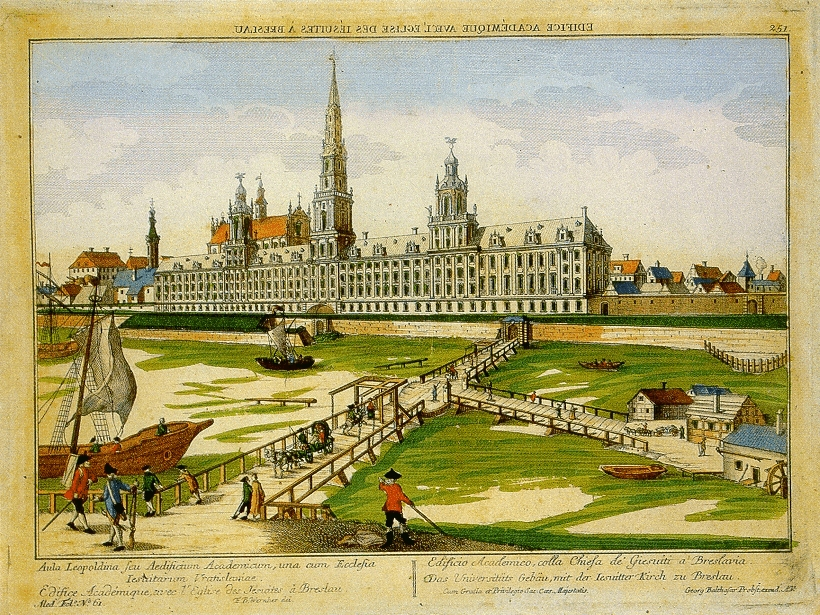
Proposed design of Leopoldina (never fully completed), 1760

The oldest mention of a university in Wrocław comes from the foundation deed signed on 20 July 1505 for the Generale litterarum Gymnasium in Wrocław by King Vladislaus II of Hungary (Polish: Władysław II Jagiellończyk) of the Polish Jagiellonian dynasty. However, the new academic institution requested by the town council was not built, because the King's deed was rejected by Pope Julius II for political reasons. Also, the numerous wars and opposition from the University of Kraków might have played a role. The first successful founding deed known as the Aurea bulla fundationis Universitatis Wratislaviensis was signed two centuries later, on 1 October 1702, by the Holy Roman Emperor Leopold I of the House of Austria, King of Hungary and Bohemia.

The predecessor facilities, which existed since 1638, were converted into Jesuit school, and finally, upon instigation of the Jesuits and with the support of the Silesian Oberamtsrat (Second Secretary) Johannes Adrian von Plencken, donated as a university in 1702 by Emperor Leopold I as a School of Philosophy and Catholic Theology with the designated name Leopoldina. On 15 November 1702, the university opened. Johannes Adrian von Plencken also became chancellor of the university. As a Catholic institute in Protestant Breslau, the new university was an important instrument of the Counter-Reformation in Silesia. After Silesia passed to Prussia, the university lost its ideological character, but remained a religious institution for the education of Catholic clergy in Prussia.

=== Silesian Friedrich Wilhelm University in Breslau ===
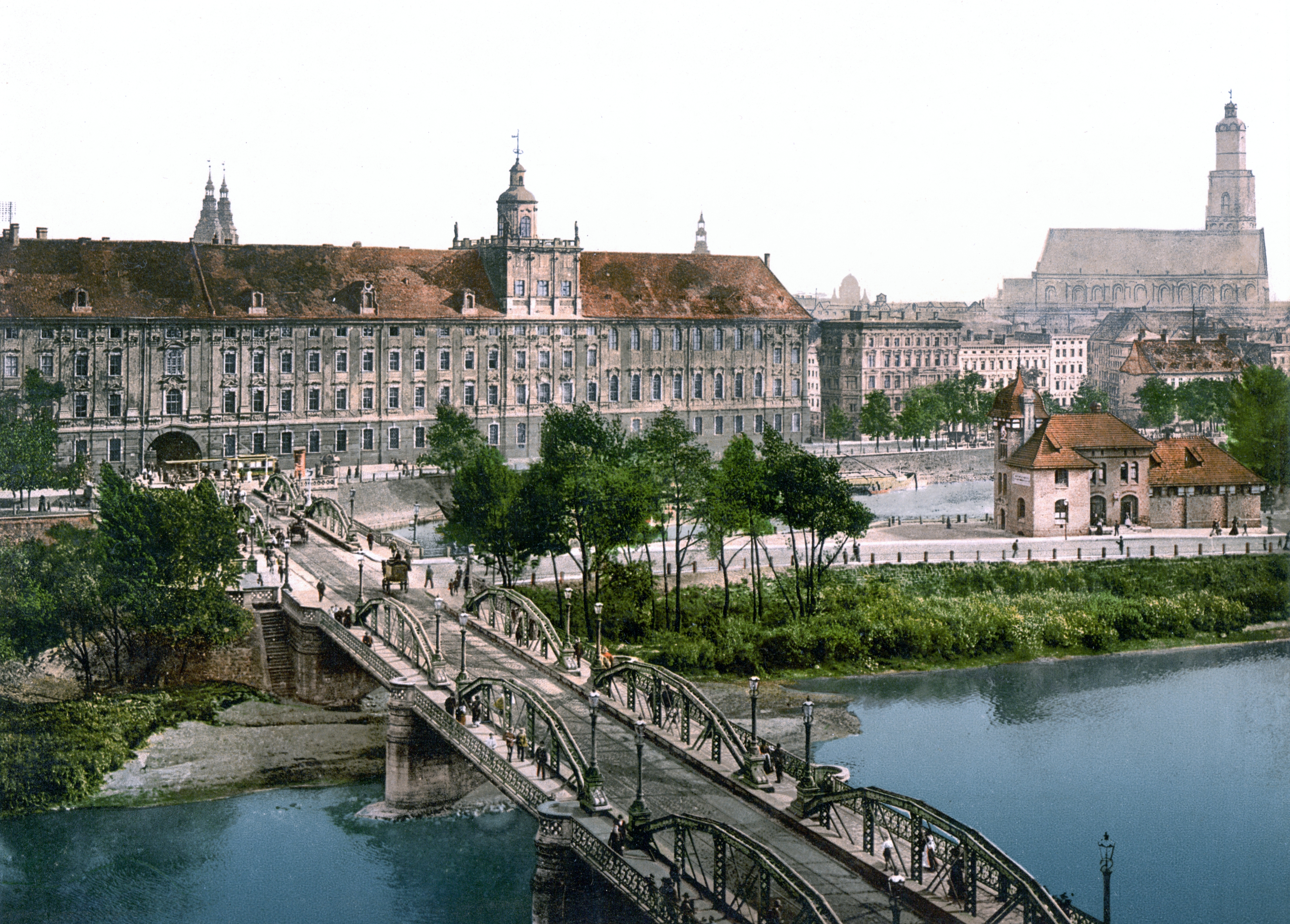
The University of Breslau, 19th century

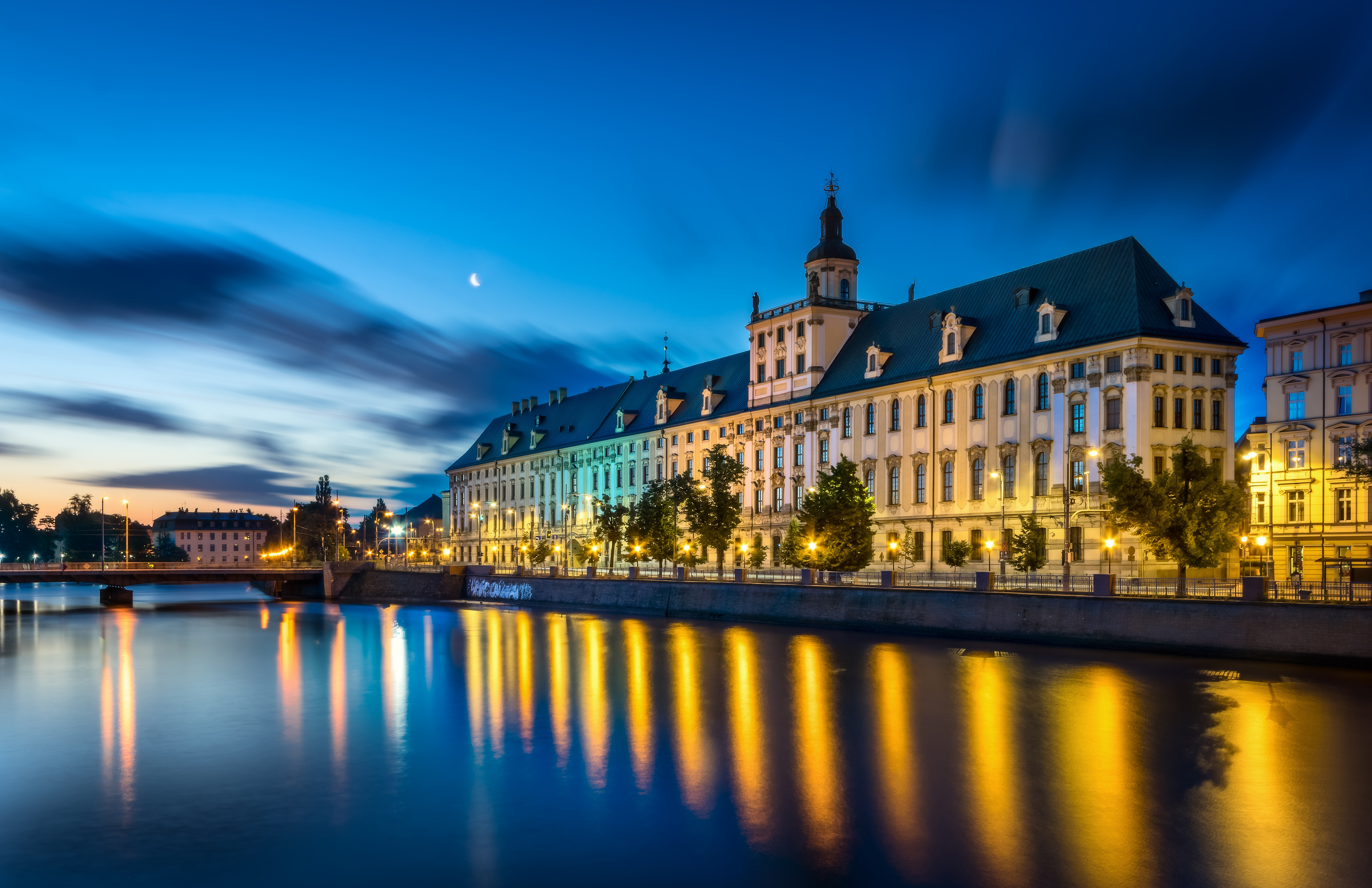
The main building of the University of Wrocław

After the defeat of Prussia by Napoleon and the subsequent reorganisation of the Prussian state, the academy was merged on 3 August 1811 with the Protestant Viadrina University, previously located in Frankfurt (Oder), and re-established in Breslau as the Königliche Universität zu Breslau – Universitas litterarum Vratislaviensis (in 1911 named the Schlesische Friedrich-Wilhelms-Universität zu Breslau, to honour the founder Frederick William III of Prussia). At first, the conjoint academy had five faculties: philosophy, medicine, law, Protestant theology, and Catholic theology.

Connected with the university were three theological seminars, a philological seminar, a seminar for German Philology, another seminar for Romanic and English philology, an historical seminar, a mathematical-physical one, a legal state seminar, and a scientific seminar. From 1842, the university also had a chair of Slavic Studies. The university had twelve different scientific institutes, six clinical centers, and three collections. An agricultural institute with ten teachers and forty-four students, comprising a chemical veterinary institute, a veterinary institute, and a technological institute, was added to the university in 1881. In 1884, the university had 1,481 students in attendance, with a faculty numbering 131.

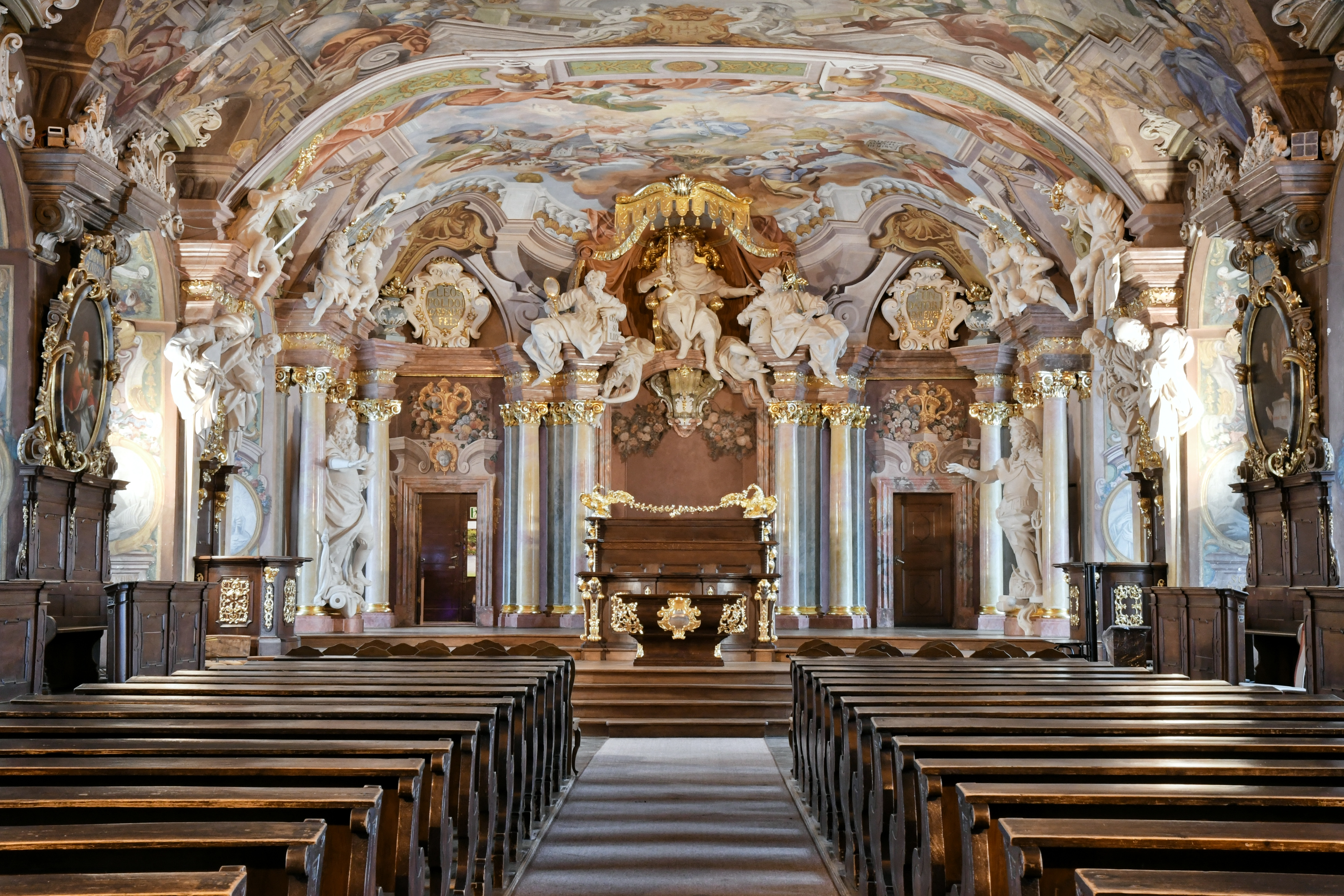
Aula Leopoldina

The library in 1885 consisted of approximately 400,000 works, including about 2,400 incunabula, approximately 250 Aldines, and 2,840 manuscripts. These volumes came from the libraries of the former universities of Frankfurt and Breslau and from disestablished monasteries, and also included the oriental collections of the Bibliotheca Habichtiana and the academic Leseinstitut.

In addition, the university owned an observatory; a five-hectare botanical garden; a botanical museum and a zoological garden founded in 1862 by a joint-stock company; a natural history museum; zoological, chemical, and physical collections; the chemical laboratory; the physiological plant; a mineralogical institute; an anatomical institute; clinical laboratories; a gallery (mostly from churches, monasteries, etc.) full of old German works; the museum of Silesian antiquities; and the state archives of Silesia.

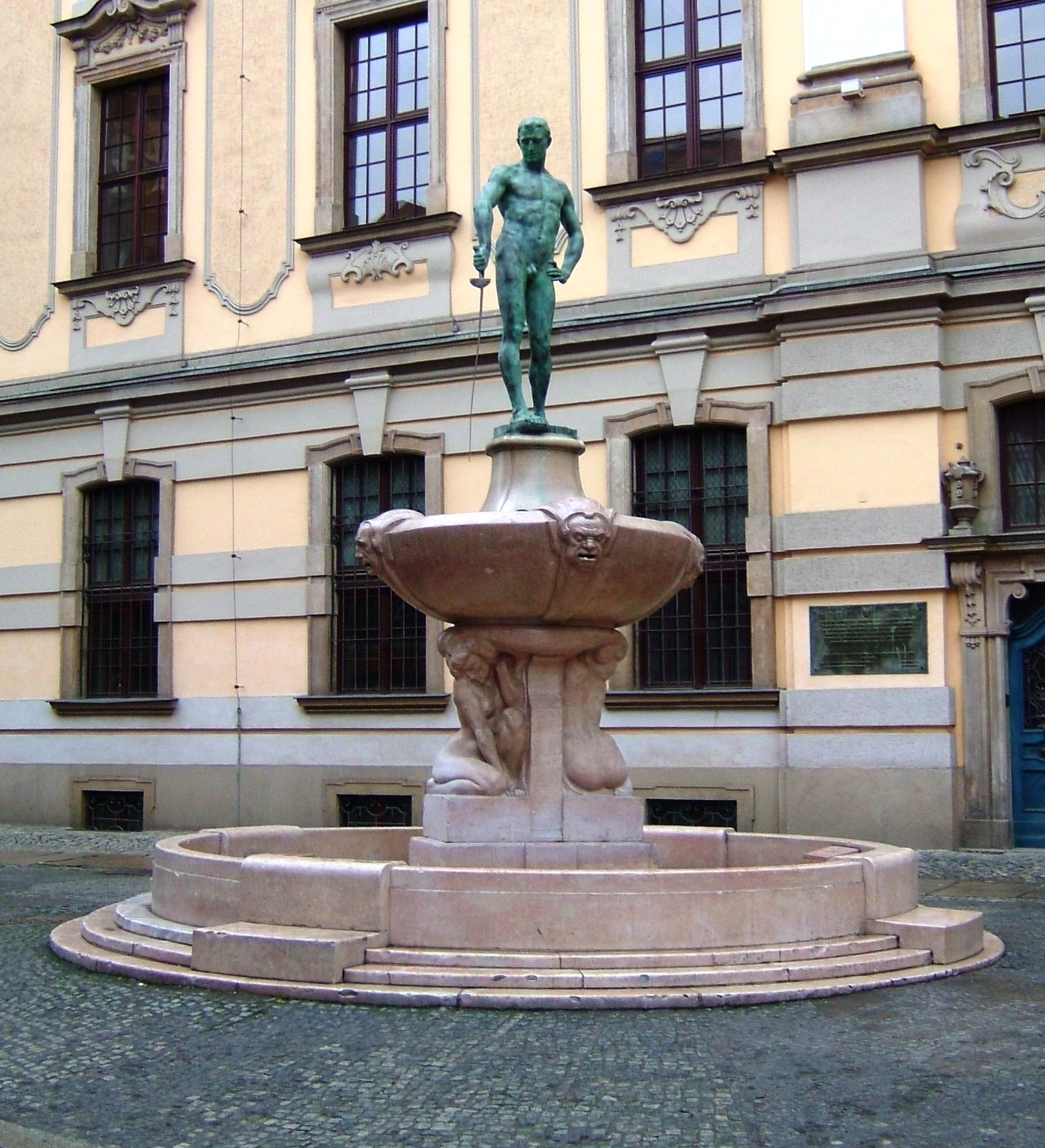
Fencer fountain on the university square, installed in 1904 and designed by Hugo Lederer

In the late 19th century, numerous internationally renowned and historically notable scholars lectured at the University of Breslau, Peter Gustav Lejeune Dirichlet, Ferdinand Cohn, and Gustav Kirchhoff among them. In 1817, Poles made up around 16% of the student body. At the end of the 19th century around 10% of the students were Polish and 16% were Jewish. This situation reflected the multi ethnic and international character of the university. Both minorities, as well as the German students, established their own student organisations, called Burschenschaften. Polish student organisations included Concordia, Polonia, and a branch of the Sokol association. Many of the students came from other areas of partitioned Poland. The Jewish students unions were the Viadrina (founded 1886) and the Student Union (1899). Teutonia, a German Burschenschaft founded in 1817, was actually one of the oldest student fraternities in Germany, founded only two years after the Urburschenschaft. The Polish fraternities were all eventually disbanded by the German professor Felix Dahn, and in 1913 Prussian authorities established a numerus clausus law that limited the number of Jews from non-German Eastern Europe (so called Ostjuden) that could study in Germany to at most 900. The University of Breslau was allowed to take 100. As Germany turned to Nazism, the university became influenced by Nazi ideology. Polish students were beaten by NSDAP members just for speaking Polish. In 1939, all Polish students were expelled and an official university declaration stated, "We are deeply convinced that [another] Polish foot will never cross the threshold of this German university". In that same year, German scholars from the university worked on a scholarly thesis of historical justification for a "plan of mass deportation in Eastern territories"; among the people involved was Walter Kuhn, a specialist of Ostforschung. Other projects during World War II involved creating evidence to justify German annexation of Polish territories, and presenting Kraków and Lublin as German cities.

In January 2015, the university restored 262 PhD degrees stripped during the Nazi period from Jews and other scholars seen as hostile to the Nazis.

=== University of Wrocław ===
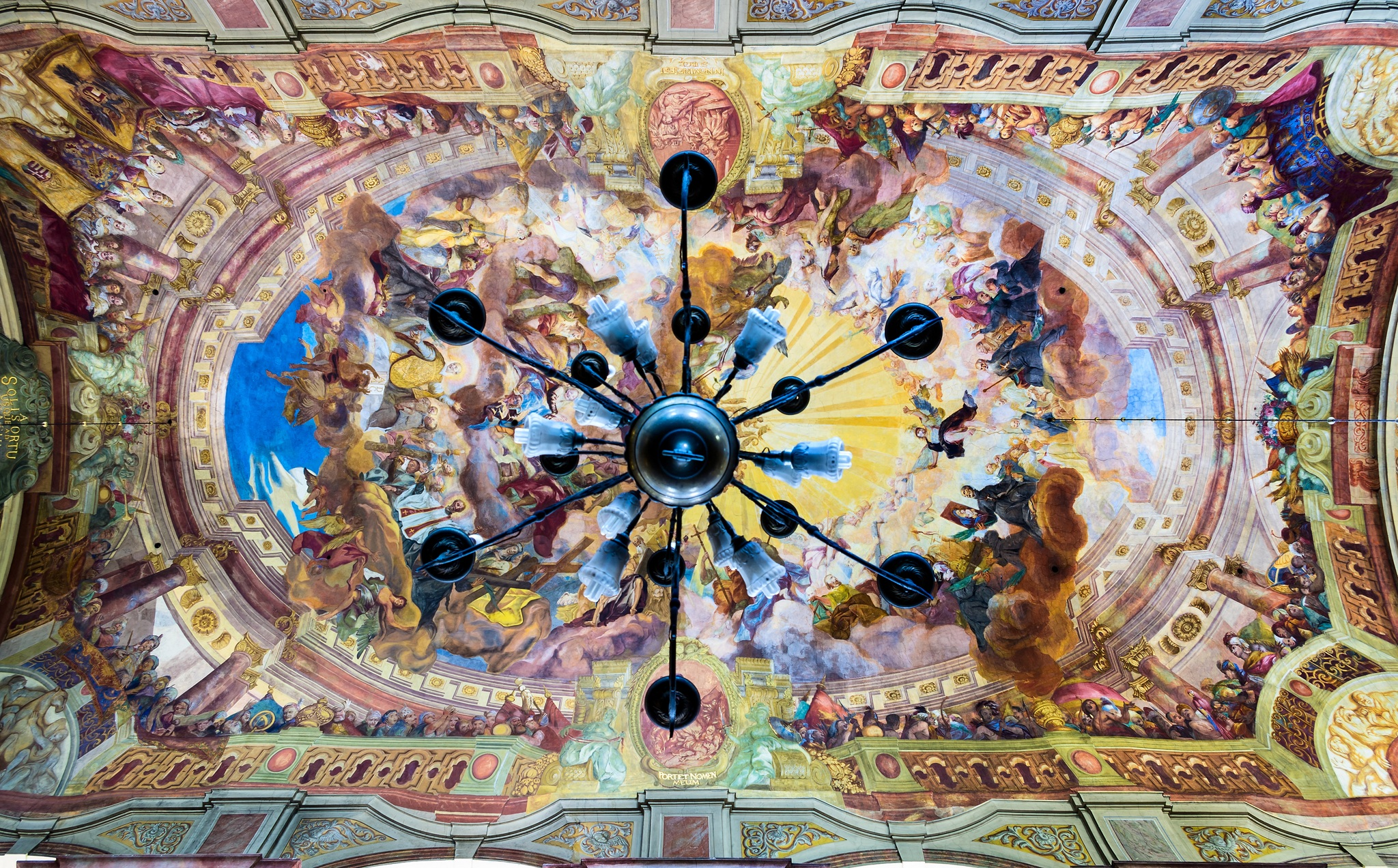
The University Church, vault

After the Siege of Breslau, the Red Army took the city in May 1945. Breslau, now known as Wrocław, became part of the Republic of Poland. The first Polish team of academics arrived in Wrocław in late May 1945 and took custody of the university buildings, which were 70% destroyed. Parts of the collection of the university library perished during the Soviet offensive in 1945, burned by soldiers on 10 May 1945, four days after the German garrison surrendered the city.

University rankings

Global – Overall
- CWTS World: 710
- QS World: 801–1000
- THE World: 801–1000
- USNWR Global: 833

Regional – Overall
- QS Emerging Europe and Central Asia: 49 (2022)

Very quickly, some buildings were repaired, and a cadre of professors was built up, many coming from prewar Polish Jan Kazimierz University of Lwów and Stefan Batory University of Wilno. Following postwar border shifts, thousands of former employees of the Lwów Library, the Jan Kazimierz University and Ossoliński National Institute moved to the city. In mid-1948, over 60% of professors at the Wrocław University and Polytechnic were from Kresy, with academics from prewar Lwów playing a particularly important role in the newly established Polish institutions of higher learning. Stanisław Kulczyński from the University of Lwów was nominated the first president of the two Polish universities in Wrocław, while Edward Sucharda from the Lwów Polytechnic became the vice-president.

The University of Wrocław was refounded as a Polish state university by the decree of the State National Council issued on 24 August 1945. The first lecture was given on 15 November 1945, by Ludwik Hirszfeld. Between 1952 and 1989 the university was named Bolesław Bierut University of Wrocław (Polish: Uniwersytet Wrocławski im. Bolesława Bieruta) after Bolesław Bierut, the communist President of the Republic of Poland (1947–52).

In 2015, nearly 80 years after the fact, the university restored academic degrees stripped from German Jews by the Nazis owing to German anti-Semitism. "Wroclaw University estimates that in total some 262 people suffered a similar fate."

== Faculties ==
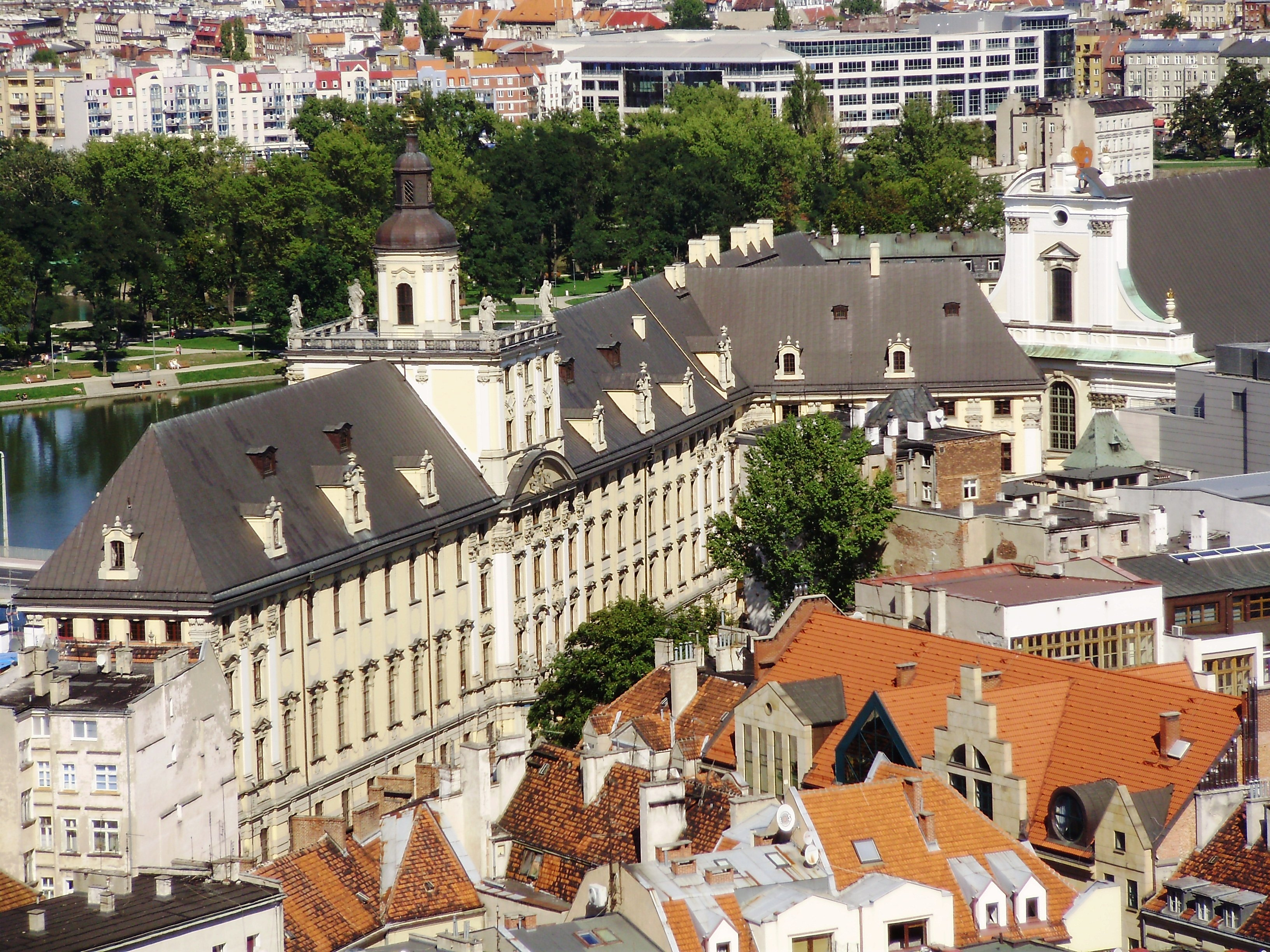
Collegium Maximum of the University of Wrocław seen from the Old Town

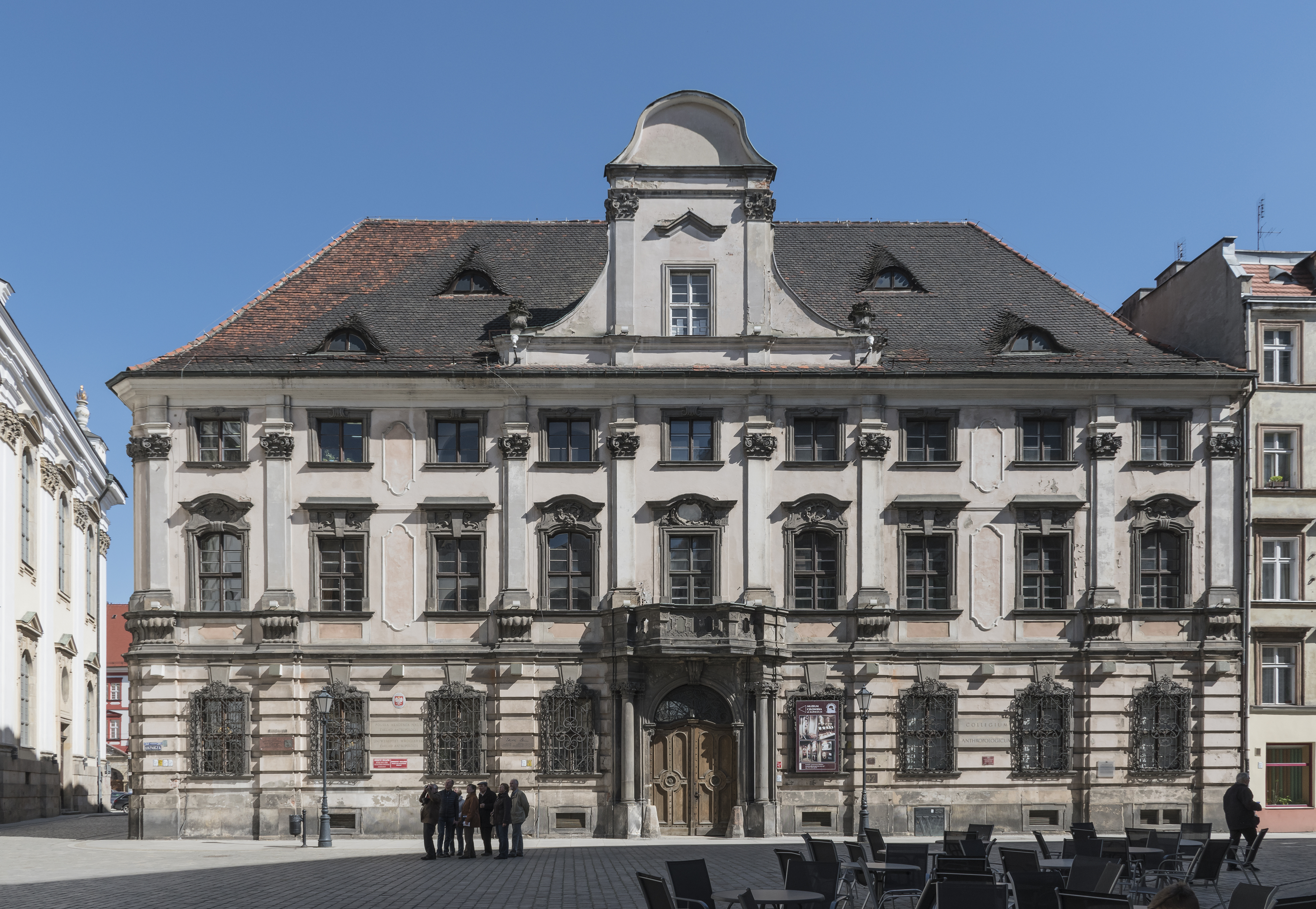
Collegium Anthropologicum on Kuźnicza Street

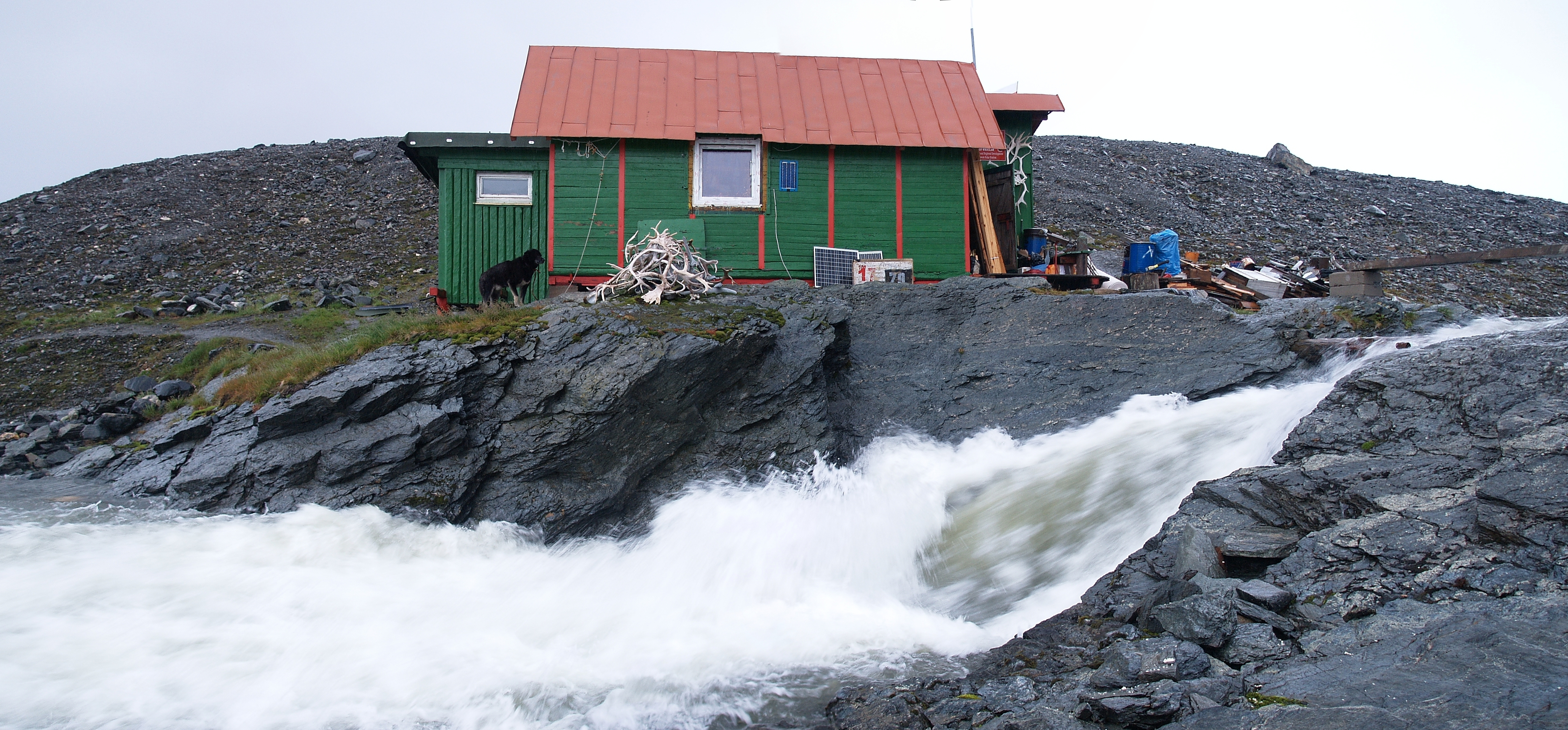
Stanisław Baranowski Spitsbergen Polar Station

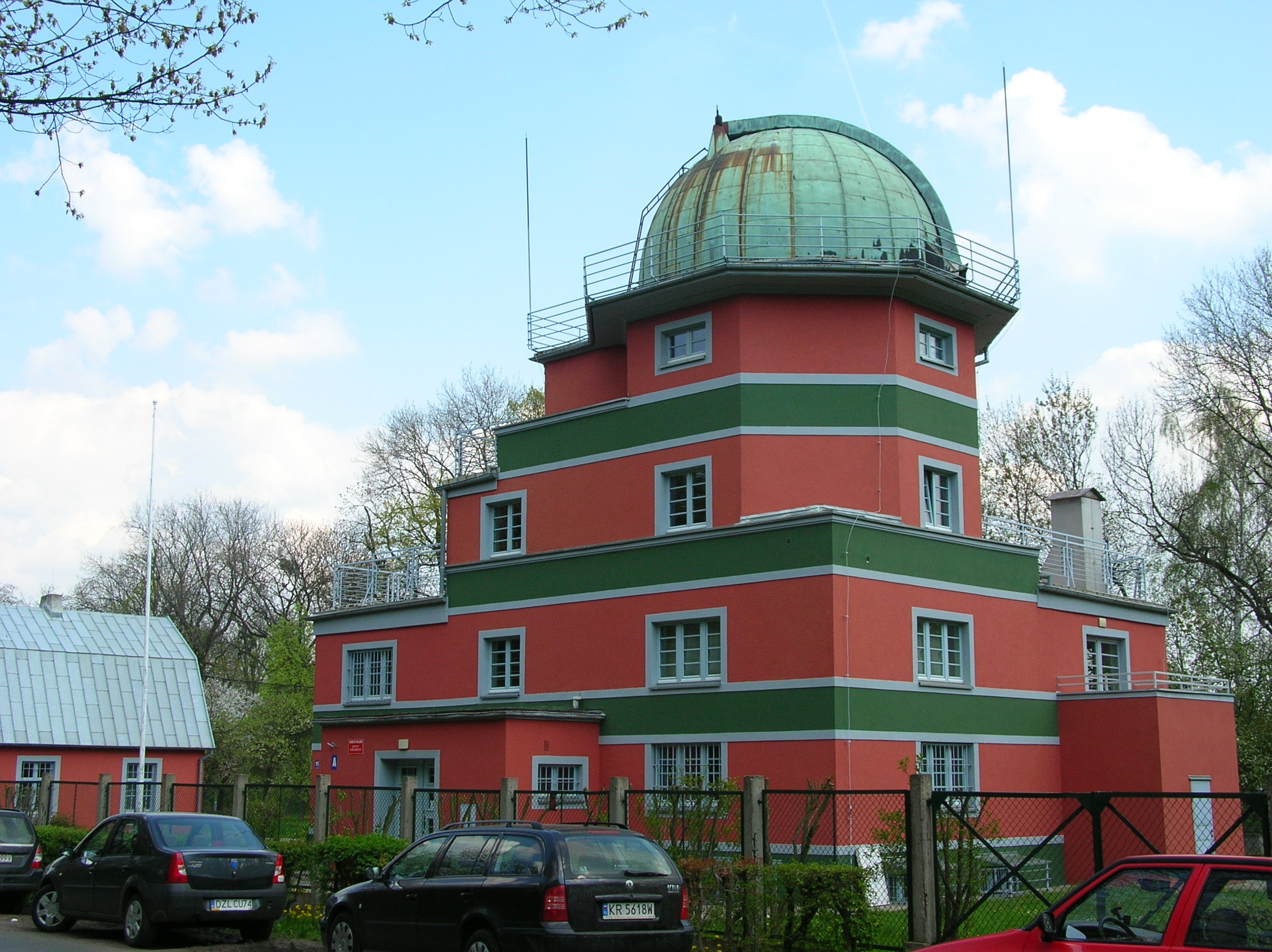
Astronomical Institute of the Wrocław University

There are 10 faculties that provide 44 areas of study, in which the language medium is mostly in Polish, with only some in English. The University of Wrocław provides Bachelor, Master, and Doctoral level programmes. The degree certificates awarded by UWr are recognised globally.

- Faculty of Biotechnology
- Faculty of Chemistry
- Faculty of Philology
- Faculty of Physics and Astronomy
- Faculty of Mathematics and Computer Science
- Faculty of Biological Sciences
- Faculty of History and Pedagogy
- Faculty of Earth and Environmental Sciences
- Faculty of Social Sciences
- Faculty of Law, Administration and Economics

== Rectors ==
- Stanisław Kulczyński (1945–1951)
- Jan Mydlarski (1951–1953)
- Edward Marczewski (1953–1957)
- Kazimierz Szarski (1957–1959)
- Witold Świda (1959–1962)
- Alfred Jahn (1962–1968)
- Włodzimierz Berutowicz (1968–1971)
- Marian Orzechowski (1971–1975)
- Kazimierz Urbanik (1975–1981)
- Józef Łukaszewicz (1981–1982)
- Henryk Ratajczak (1982–1984)
- Jan Mozrzymas (1984–1987)
- Mieczysław Klimowicz (1987–1990)
- Wojciech Wrzesiński (1990–1995)
- Roman Duda (1995–1999)
- Romuald Gelles (1999–2002)
- Zdzisław Latajka (2002–2005)
- Leszek Pacholski (2005–2008)
- Marek Bojarski (2008–2016)
- Adam Jezierski (2016–2020)
- Przemysław Wiszewski (2020–2022)
- Robert Olkiewicz (since 2022)

== Notable alumni and staff ==
- Albert Wojciech Adamkiewicz
- Adolf Anderssen
- Adam Asnyk
- Grzegorz Braun
- Ruth Baum
- Mateusz Morawiecki
- Paweł Marchewka
- Kamil Bortniczuk
- Robert Bunsen
- Florian Ceynowa
- Hans Cloos
- Stephan Cohn-Vossen
- Jan Dzierżon
- Norbert Elias
- August von Fallersleben
- Heinz von Foerster
- Heinz Fraenkel-Conrat
- Gustav Freytag
- August Froehlich
- Otto von Gierke
- Adolph Eduard Grube
- Fritz Haber
- Siegmund Hadda
- Clara Immerwahr
- Otto Jaekel
- Jan Kasprowicz
- Paweł Kempka
- Gustav Kirchhoff
- Stanisław Knapowski
- Bronisław Knaster
- Adolf Kober
- Wojciech Korfanty
- Urszula Kozioł
- Waldemar Kozuschek
- Marek Krajewski
- Emil Krebs
- Moshe Kunitz
- Otto Küstner
- Hans Lammers
- Ferdinand Lassalle
- Kurt Lischka
- Jan Łopuszańki
- Jerzy Łoś
- Michaelis Machol
- Kazimierz Marcinkiewicz
- Edward Marczewski
- Antoni Matuszkiewicz
- Henry J. Messing
- Gustav Meyer
- Julius Lothar Meyer
- Jan Mikusiński
- Jan Miodek
- Karol Modzelewski
- Jan Mycielski
- Jan Noskiewicz
- Barbara Piasecka Johnson
- Stanisław Potrzebowski
- Jan Evangelista Purkyně
- Eugen Rosenstock-Huessy
- Friedlieb Ferdinand Runge
- Wojciech Samotij
- Joseph Schacht
- Rudolf Schnackenburg
- Karel Slavíček
- Władysław Ślebodziński
- Karl Slotta
- Edith Stein (Saint Teresa Benedicta of the Cross)
- Charles Proteus Steinmetz
- Hugo Steinhaus
- Otto Stern
- Paul Tillich
- Carl Wernicke
- Mieczysław Wolfke
- Seweryn Wysłouch
- Konrad Wytrychowski
- Johannes Zukertort

Honorary Doctorates

- Johannes Brahms

== See also ==
- Wrocław University of Technology
- List of early modern universities in Europe
- List of Jesuit sites
- Academic Festival Overture
