= August Assmann =

German entomologist

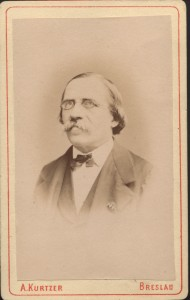
August Assmann

August Assmann (1819-1898) was a German entomologist who specialised in fossil insects of Lepidoptera and Hemiptera.

His collections are in the Museum of Natural History at University of Wrocław.

== Publications ==
Partial list

- 1847 Berichtigung und Ergänzung der schlesischen Lepidopteren Fauna Ent. Z. Breslau Lepid. (1) 1: 2-6
- 1854. Verzeichniss der 1847 bei Constantinopel u. Brussa gefundenen Schmetterlinge. Zeitschrift für Entomologie 8:14-17.
- 1870. Paleontologie. Beitrage zur Insekten-Fauna der Vorwelt Einleitung. 1 Beitrag. Die fossilen Insekten des tertiaren (miocenen) Thonlagers von Schossnitz bei Kanth in Schles. Z. Entomol. (Breslau). N.F. Ser. 2. Bd 1. S. 42-43
- 1870. Paleontologie. Beitrage zur Insekten-Fauna der Vorwelt Einleitung. 2 Beitrag. Fossile Insekten aus der tertiaren (oligocenen) Braunkohle von Naumburg am Bober. Z. Entomol. (Breslau). N.F. 1.1-62.
