= Underground hip-hop =

Umbrella term for hip-hop that rejects mainstream aesthetics

Underground hip-hop (also known as underground rap) is a scene and style of hip-hop music that is defined as being countercultural in nature, existing outside of and in contrast to the sounds, style and aesthetics of mainstream hip-hop. Despite this, underground artists have often reached widespread success and popularity through internet virality, critical acclaim, or appearances on the Billboard charts.

Originally associated with conscious, experimental and progressive rap, the term later shifted to refer to several trap-descendant internet rap scenes and music that emerged during the late 2000s and 2010s.

== Etymology ==
In 2026, the blog Pigeons & Planes published an article regarding the semantic change of the term "underground rap" in the 2020s online rap scene. Mano Sundaresan the Head of Editorial Content at of Pitchfork and co-founder of the blog No Bells has described modern underground hip-hop as falling into two camps, an "underground that's truly independent and truly DIY that caters to very specific audiences" and an underground scene of "party-adjacent artists who sprang up during the Covid era in these cordoned off bubbles on the internet".

== History ==
=== 1980s–2000s: Origins ===
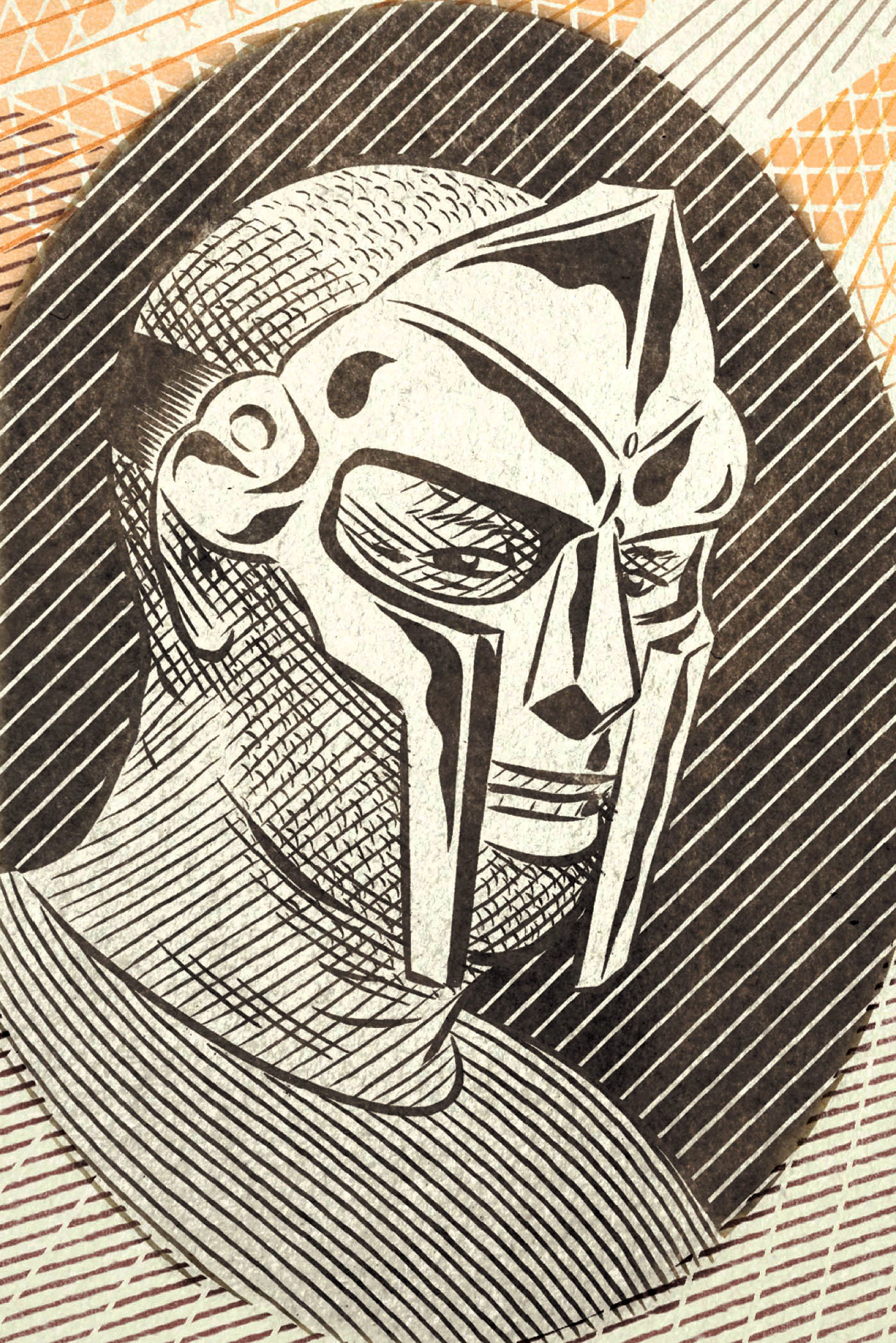
MF Doom portrait illustration from a poster promoting his 2011 Born Like This tour of the UK

Although hip-hop originally emerged from New York's underground music scene during the early 1970s, by the end of the decade, the genre began to gain wider commercial success and mainstream attention through the prominence of disco-rap, which prompted early underground artists to explore more experimental approaches to their work. In 1983, Rammellzee and K-Rob released the single "Beat Bop", which was produced and arranged by Jean-Michel Basquiat. Though it remained largely underground, the track was later described as a blueprint for the "apocalyptic, witty, and experimental" style of later experimental hip-hop artists such as Antipop Consortium and El-P.

By the late 1980s, as hip-hop became more prominent, young artists began to create and release music independently, as many were unable to obtain record deals. The Stretch Armstrong and Bobbito Show, a radio show that was broadcast on WKCR (and later WQHT), which ran from 1990 to 1999, became well known for welcoming unsigned artists on to the show to freestyle a verse, which resulted in wider publicity and possibly even a record deal for that artist. Across the United States, several regional underground hip-hop scenes emerged, most notably on the East and West Coasts, as well as in the South, which included the Houston, Atlanta and Memphis rap scenes. This era saw the emergence of styles such as horrorcore and nerdcore. Subsequently, underground hip-hop artists such as Jedi Mind Tricks, Kool Keith, B. Dolan, Diabolic, Immortal Technique, Insane Clown Posse, Del the Funky Homosapien, and Hieroglyphics later emerged, incorporating lo-fi production techniques and conscious lyricism. By the late 1990s, progressive rap acts such as Black Star and Juggaknots became notable in the scene, alongside traditional underground hip-hop artists like Aesop Rock, Artifacts, People Under the Stairs, CunninLynguists, and Rob Sonic.

By the early 2000s, artists such as MF Doom, Edan, Clouddead, Dälek and Madlib, gained wider notoriety, which brought the underground scene to wider audiences as well as contributed to the wider proliferation of the sound, style and aesthetics that would become associated with underground hip-hop.

=== Late 2000s–2010s: Digital Age ===
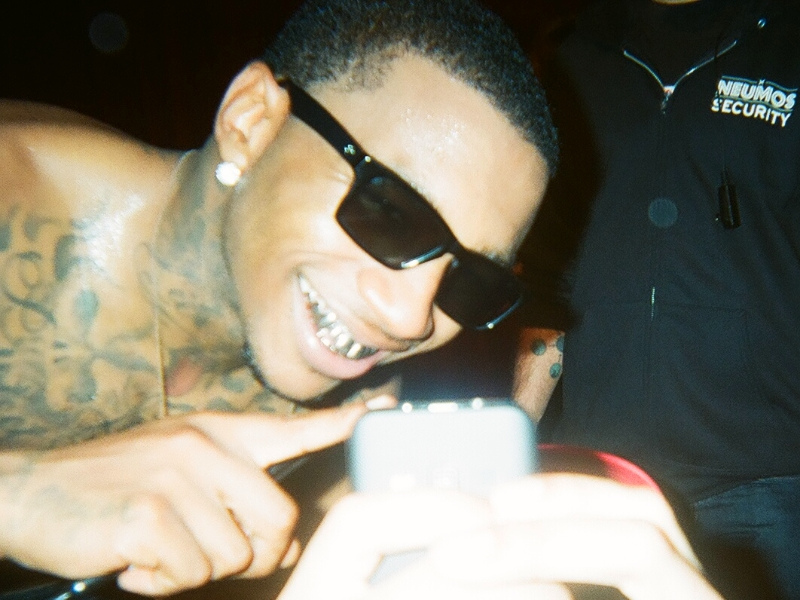
Lil B credited as "the godfather of internet rap"

During the late 2000s, young artists began leveraging the internet to promote their independently released music through online social media platforms like Myspace and the music distribution website DatPiff. Through these channels, California-based rapper Lil B, and producer Clams Casino have been credited with pioneering the trap-based subgenre cloud rap, which became a staple and major influence of what will later be defined as "internet rap", a categorization of hip-hop artists with sounds and communities that were developed from and alongside internet culture. As internet rap began to gain more traction, specifically due to the increasing popularity of audio streaming service SoundCloud, underground hip-hop began to shift away from conscious lyricism and traditional hip-hop instrumentals and more towards trap subgenres.

Despite this shift, artists such as Zelooperz, Mach-Hommy, Billy Woods, Ka, Elucid, Earl Sweatshirt, the Alchemist and collective Armand Hammer continued releasing music with the traditional underground sound, building on traditional hip-hop production and an emphasis on conscious or abstract lyricism. Contemporaneous non-trap based developments in online underground rap during this period, included experimental and industrial hip-hop artists such as Death Grips, JPEGMAFIA, Clipping and Injury Reserve.

In 2012, Black Kray's Goth Money alongside Wicca Phase's GothBoiClique and cloud rap pioneer Bones, would later draw influences from witch house, subsequently leading to the development of emo rap. Additionally, Kray's early collaborations with Working on Dying contributed to the development of tread music. By 2013, Swedish cloud rap artist Yung Lean's track Ginseng Strip 2002 went viral online, influencing a new generation of underground internet rappers. The Swedish online rap collective Drain Gang, consisting of Bladee, Ecco2k, Thaiboy Digital, and Whitearmor, further influenced the development of underground online rap music.

The shift of underground hip-hop towards its online-based sound continued throughout the mid-2010s with the outgrowth of mumble rap, a style pioneered by artists such as Playboi Carti and Lil Uzi Vert, who brought the new underground sound to the forefront of hip-hop and internet culture. Playboi Carti's success in the late 2010s led to him founding Opium, an Atlanta-based record label and collective, resulting in the subsequent emergence of artists such as Ken Carson and Destroy Lonely, who both reached wider popularity in the early 2020s. Due to Opium's popularity, influence and online cult following, the underground rap scene pioneered a punk-inspired fashion style colloquially known as "opiumcore", which has been noted as being influential to later high fashion and streetwear trends.

=== 2020s ===
Throughout the early 2020s, underground hip-hop continued developing its sound by expanding on subgenres of trap, primarily plugg and rage and keeping its culture aligned with that of the internet, with Rolling Stone describing the 2020s underground rap scene as "extremely online". From plugg emerged the pluggnb microgenre and artists such as Summrs, Tana, Kankan, Iayze and Autumn!, as well as rage influenced artists such as Yeat, OsamaSon, Yung Fazo, Prettifun, and Che, many of whom later reached widespread success.

Writing for Pitchfork, music critic Kieran Press-Reynolds stated that the underground scene in the early 2020s was "splintering every which way, from wailing digicore to bitcrushed hexD." He credited Reptilian Club Boyz as being alongside other groups in "the nexus for a new vanguard".

The influence of hyperpop led to subsequent trap-based microgenres that emerged or primarily developed during the early 2020s, such as sigilkore, jerk, rage, hexD, digicore and krushclub. Notable artists in these scenes include Luci4, Xaviersobased, Nettspend, Yabujin, Yhapojj, Jane Remover, Lucy Bedroque, Rich Amiri, and Bleood. Online collectives such as Novagang, Jewelxxet, and Surf Gang were considered influential.

The traditional underground sound has maintained relevance as well, due to continued releases from the Alchemist, and the increasing popularity of artists such as Billy Woods, Mike, Mavi, and Redveil.

== Regional scenes ==
=== United Kingdom ===
During the late 2010s to early 2020s, a new rap scene emerged in the United Kingdom, with notable acts including EsDeeKid, Fakemink, Rico Ace, Fimiguerrero, Feng, Lancey Foux, Jim Legxacy, YT, Kwes E, Niko B, Skaiwater, SINN6R, Finessekid, Phreshboyswag, and Ledbyher. The scene is heavily inspired by internet rap subgenres such as cloud rap, plugg, rage and jerk. Despite its "underground" label, the movement has gained traction on social media.

=== Canada ===
The Canadian underground rap scene was spearheaded by Vancouver rapper, Eric Reprid and Toronto rapper Twentythree.

=== Asia ===
In China, artists Bloodz Boi, Billionhappy and Jackzebra spearheaded a local Chinese underground rap scene. In Thailand, artists Illslick and Youngohm emerged.

=== Latin America ===
In Argentina, the underground rap scene was spearheaded by the SwaggerBoyz collective led by rappers AgusFortnite2008 and Stiffy. Writing for Rolling Stone magazine, music journalist Reanna Cruz described the Argentinian underground rap scene as "post-hyperpop". The scene is centered around Buenos Aires. Writing for Pitchfork, music journalist Kieran Press-Reynolds noted internet cross-pollination and the election of Javier Milei, described as "a Trump-like" figure "casting a shadow over everything".

== See also ==
- List of Internet rap collectives
