= Finessekid =

British rapper

- Also known as: FK
- Born: Glodi Mampuli; October 2001 (age 25)
- Origin: Lambeth, South London, England
- Genres: UK Underground; drill; rage; trap; jerk rap
- Occupations: Rapper; fashion designer; visual director
- Years active: 2024-present
- Website: https://www.usneverdem.com/

Glodi Mampuli (born October 2001), known professionally as Finessekid or simply FK, is a British rapper from Lambeth, South London. He is known for his unorthodox approach to UK Rap, blending elements of drill, trap, rage and club.

== Career ==
In October 2025, Mampuli collaborated with Skepta on the single "Sirens (From Ireland)". Later in November, he made a cameo appearance in the music video for Central Cee's "Booga". On 15 December 2025, Complex ranked his self-titled EP Finessekid at number 22 on its list of "Complex UK's Best Albums of 2025".

In January 2026, Mampuli released the collaborative single "Mightjuss" with Lancey Foux. He was nominated for Best Newcomer at the 2026 MOBO Awards alongside other UK Underground artists including YT, Jim Legxacy and EsDeeKid in that same month. Early in August, he featured on Len Lucci's Goldenboy and later on Lancey Foux's The Time of Our Lives. At the end of August, he performed his first solo set at Reading Festival. In October 2026, he made an appearance on Chase and Status's Generic Everything alongside Blanco. In November 2026, Mampuli featured on Skepta's The Fork and Knife.

== Artistry ==
Mampuli's musical style incorporates production styles from electronic dance elements alongside heavy bass.

Notion highlighted how Mampuli's lyrics detail his personal background and early life, where on "Linked In" he references his time at college prior to pursuing music. Other music outlets have also described his delivery as conversational and playful.
