= Feng (rapper) =

British rapper and record producer (born 2006)

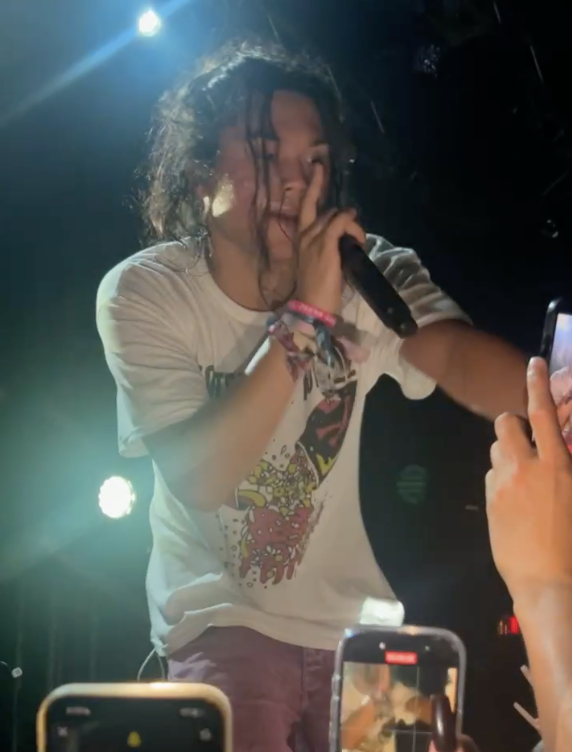
- Feneley performing at The Pearl, 2026

Background information
- Born: Travas Alan Feneley; March 31, 2006 (age 20)
- Origin: Croydon, England
- Genre: UK underground rap
- Occupations: Rapper; record producer
- Instrument: Vocals
- Years active: 2024–present

Travas Alan Feneley (born 31 March 2006), known professionally as Feng, is a British rapper and record producer. His debut EP, What the Feng (2025), brought him to popularity in the UK underground rap scene.

== Life and career ==
Travis Alan Feneley was raised in Croydon in South London. He is a born-again Christian. He played football in secondary school as a midfielder. Before becoming an engineer, he worked as a lifeguard in Purley, as a video editor, and in a post-school intern program. He also started a YouTube channel, where he showed himself learning how to use FL Studio and making rap songs on BandLab. Growing up, Feng was introduced to music at an early age by his older brothers, who introduced him to artists such as Tyler, The Creator, and Foster the People among others.

Feng began producing music in 2019 and released his debut single as a rapper in August 2024. Feng's songs "Damn Phone" and "M.I.A.", a tribute to the singer of the same name, were both released in 2024. He released debut mixtape, What the Feng, in February 2025. His single "Princess" and a music video for his song "Kids from the West" were also released that year. He soon rose to prominence as part of a wave of UK underground rappers from the United Kingdom, including Fakemink and YT. Robert Moran of The Age wrote that, by late 2025, he and Fakemink were being hailed as "Britain's new musical saviours" and that "internet hyperbolists" considered him to be "the future of music". Feng made his Rolling Loud debut in Orlando, Florida, on May 10, 2026.

Feng’s debut album, Weekend Rockstar, was released on Friday, February 13, 2026. In an article published by The Fader, Feng was listed as one of the 32 coolest rappers of 2026.

== Musical style ==
Alphonse Pierre of Pitchfork described Feng's music on What the Feng as having "the fadedness of old Piff Gang and the coming-of-age spirit of early Mac Miller". India Roby of The Fader wrote in 2025 that his music ranged from jerk to "Scouse rap" and also had "a bit of an indie-pop-meets-hip-hop sound". For Complex, Antonio Johri described his songs as combining "glossy synthesizers with hyperactive 808s" and as paying homage to the "electronic-rap" of the 2010s. Feng's motivational lyrics often focus on themes of positivity, hedonism, and encouraging people to be themselves. His songs are typically around one minute long. Vivian Medithi of The Fader wrote how Feng "stood out among his cohort for his neon, indie-pop-meets-hip-hop sound and incandescent lyrics, part diary, part pep talk."

== Personal life ==
Feneley is half-English, half-Filipino. As of 2026, he is based in Brixton.

In an interview with Interview, Feneley stated that he enjoys watching films and that his favourites are Whiplash, American Beauty, Catch Me If You Can, Shawshank Redemption,and Limitless among many others.

== Discography ==
=== Extended plays ===
List of extended plays with selected details
Title	Details
What the Feng	Released: 14 February 2025; Label: Self-released; Format: Digital download, streaming
Weekend Rockstar	Released: 13 February 2026; Label: Self-released; Format: Digital download, streaming
Summer at Camp Lakepine	Released: 21 August 2026; Label: Self-released; Format: Digital download, streaming

=== Singles ===
List of singles, showing year released and album title
Title	Year	Album
"Friends"	2024	Non-album singles
"Devil Horns and a Halo"	2024	Non-album singles
"New Grime"	2024	Non-album singles
"Coming of Age"	2024	Non-album singles
"Weekend"	2024	Non-album singles
"Girl"	2024	Non-album singles
"Primrose Hill"	2024	Non-album singles
"Walk in the Park"	2024	Non-album singles
"M.I.A."	2024	Non-album singles
"Poem to Above"	2024	Non-album singles
"Damn Phone"	2024	Non-album singles
"Metamorphosis"	2024	Non-album singles
"Pink"	2024	Non-album singles
"Funeral Arguments" (with Llondon Actress)	2024	Non-album singles
"Who Do U Wanna Be"	2025	What the Feng
"Princess"	2025	Non-album singles
"Shooters" (with Sixzino)	2025	Non-album singles
"Teenage Dreamer"	2025	Non-album singles
"XOXO"	2025	Non-album singles
"When I Met You"	2025	Non-album singles
"Cali Crazy"	2026	Non-album singles
"J*b"	2026	Weekend Rockstar

== Tours ==
=== Headlining ===
- Weekend Rockstar Tour (2026)
