= Zukovstheworld =

British rapper (born 2003)

- Also known as: Max Castles
- Born: Kwasi Frempong-Manso; 23 February 2003 (age 23)
- Origin: Thornton Heath, South London
- Genre: UK underground rap
- Occupations: Rapper; record producer
- Instrument: Vocals
- Years active: 2024–present
- Label: Epic Records

Kwasi Frempong-Manso (born 23 February 2003), known professionally as Zukovstheworld, is a British rapper, singer and producer from Thornton Heath, South London. British magazine Dazed credited Frempong-Manso as a "pioneer" of the UK Underground scene.

== Early life ==
Kwasi Frempong-Manso was born 23 February 2003 in Thornton Heath, South London. He is of Ghanaian descent.

== Career ==
British magazine Dazed labeled the song "Dirty Denim" as a "standout track", adding that, "Zuko croons train-of-thought lyrics [...] choruses oscillate between chart-ready melodies and virtually unintelligible, and production flirts the line between underground rap distortion and glittery EDM clarity."

British magazine The Face described Frempong-Manso as "a prominent figure in the UK rap underground". Frempong-Manso has collaborated with artists such as Fakemink and Fimiguerrero. Dazed stated that "Zuko was UK Ug before UK Ug", adding that he provided Fakemink "some of his first features back when he was known as 9090gate, hopped on Wraith9 beats long before Timothée Chalamet had ever heard of EsDeeKid, and has been fusing DIY punk and indie sensibilities with trap and rage beats as far back as 2022." On 28 November 2025, Frempong-Manso self-released his debut album, titled End Of The World.

== Musical style and artistry ==
Frempong-Manso has described his sound as "avant-pop", stating he had previously made indie music, "guitar stuff with elements of electronic music and modern rap nuances". Clash magazine described Frempong-Manso as one of the scene's "underground prodigies". His work has been compared to Black Kray and Working on Dying.

The Face labeled Frempong-Manso's song "Eating Bullets" as making use of "studio effects to chop-up and mutate his smokey singing voice as a gentle synth-pop track gives way to hissing guitars". Adding that, "This must be the new sound he recently referred to as 'avant-pop'."

== Influence ==
British magazine Dazed credited Frempong-Manso as a pioneer of the "UK Ug scene".

On 5 December 2025, British newspaper The Guardian featured Frempong-Manso's song "Friday Night" on a Spotify playlist for the UK underground rap scene. Dazed featured his song "Eating Bullets" on their playlist.
