= UK underground rap =

2020s British hip-hop music scene and style

- Other names: UK underground; UK UG; Overground; UK's rap revolution
- Stylistic origins: UK rap; trap; cloud rap; hip-hop; plugg; rage; jerk
- Cultural origins: 2020s, United Kingdom
- Typical instruments: Drum machine; Synthesizer; Sampler; Auto-Tune; Vocals; Roland TR-808

Other topics
- Underground hip-hop; SoundCloud rap; road rap; alternative hip-hop; grime; British Invasion; Second British Invasion; Cool Britannia; UK drill; Afroswing; bassline

UK underground rap (also referred to as UK underground, UK UG, or Overground) is a UK rap scene that emerged in London during the early 2020s. The scene differs from earlier waves of underground UK hip-hop through its strong influence from American internet rap genres such as cloud rap, plugg, rage and jerk.

Much like the Britpop, mod or punk movements, the scene places Britishness at the forefront, with many artists of foreign backgrounds, especially Black British artists, reclaiming the Union Jack and British cultural imagery as an act of defiance against the far-right's use of the Union Jack. Speaking with The Guardian, director Lauzza added that young people were "creating our own Britain and our own culture that we can be proud of".

Notable artists associated with the scene include EsDeeKid, Fakemink, Rico Ace, Fimiguerrero, Feng, Lancey Foux, Jim Legxacy, and YT. The scene has achieved significant critical and commercial success, and much like the name "indie" rock, the term "underground" is now often used to refer to the genre stylistically rather than denoting popularity. The scene has been called "the UK's rap revolution".

== Characteristics ==
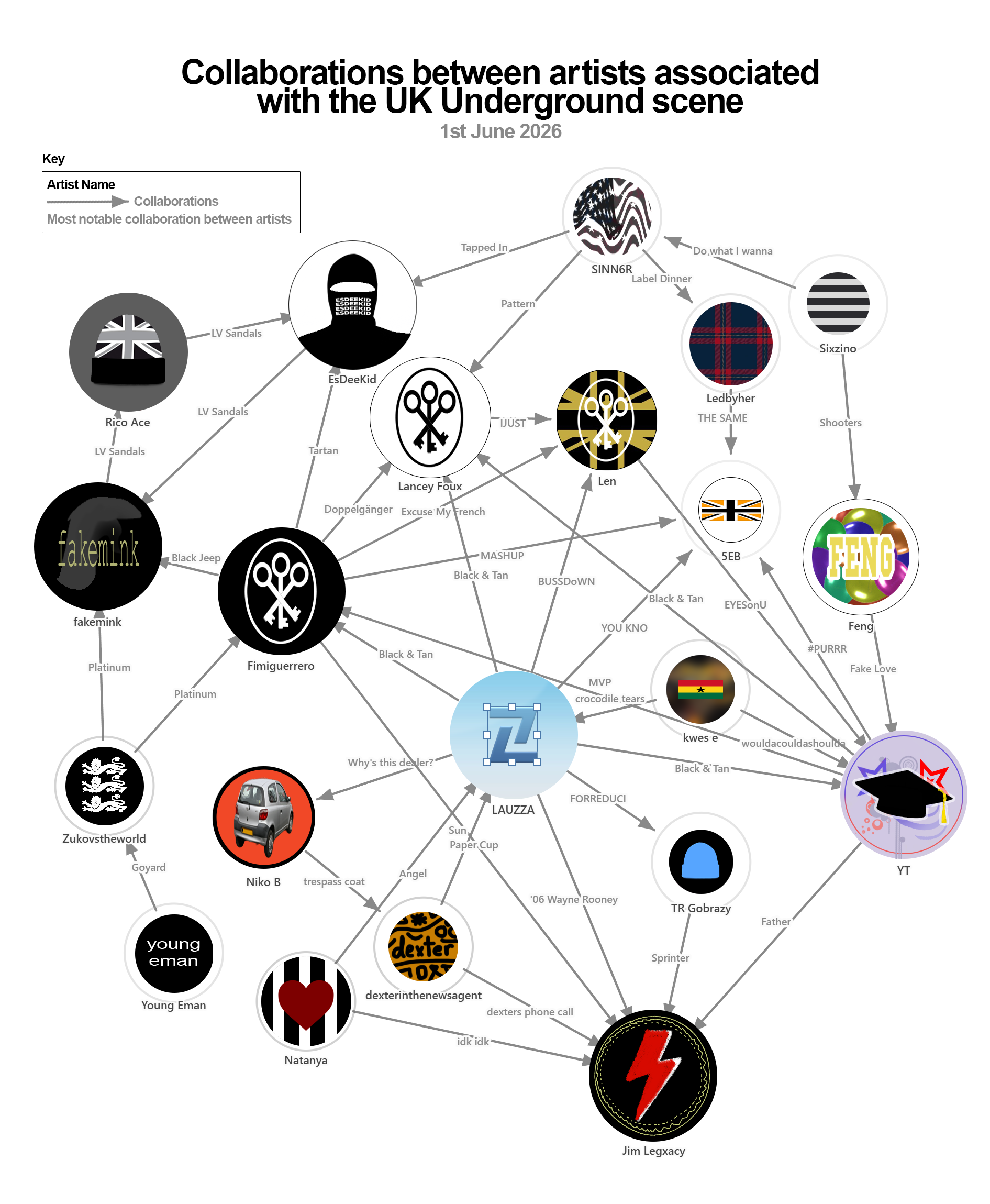
The interconnected nature of the scene has been described as one of its defining features.

The interconnected and collaborative nature of the scene is one of its defining features. The Fader has stated that it separates the scene from previous British scenes such as grime, afrobeats and drill. Romford rapper YT added that most members of the scene are "legitimate friends, not simply coworkers." In 2026, Culted magazine stated that the scene was becoming "increasingly connected".

The scene draws heavily from American rap, with artists often referencing American brands, pop culture and athletes. However, the scene maintains a strong regional British identity, with many artists rapping about everyday life in modern Britain and using their natural regional accents rather than adopting Americanised accents historically used by some British acts. EsDeeKid, for example, has been noted for rapping in a "thick" Scouse accent. Other artists have similarly embraced local identity, with Jim Legxacy and YT frequently expressing pride in being Londoners, and in their respective London boroughs.

"Best Decision"
An audio sample of a mid-2020s UK underground beat.

British magazine Dazed noted that several artists in the scene were from Generation Z and had been robbed of their youth due to the impact of the COVID-19 pandemic. In 2025, 86% of UK underground listeners on SoundCloud were from Gen Z. Director Lauzza added that "The news is just negative, negative, negative: it can be very draining for the average young person." and "We’re all just reaching for the last time we remember being truly happy, when you could come home from school and slap on FIFA and nothing else mattered."

== Etymology ==
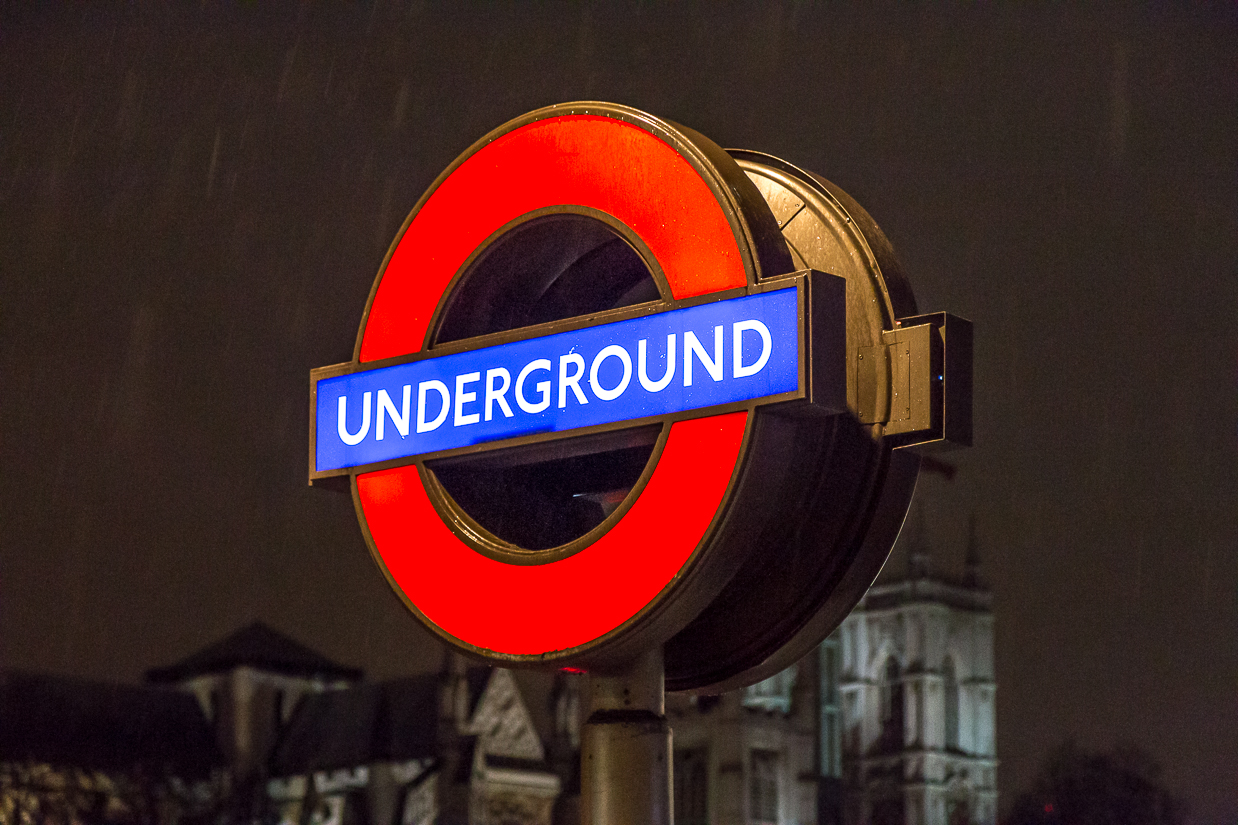
The visual identity of the London Underground and Overground networks has been adopted by some UK underground rap artists due to coincidences in naming.

The UK underground rap scene has been referred to by publications as "UK UG" and "the UK's rap revolution". The genre is sometimes simply referred to as "UK Underground". Much like "indie" rock, the term "underground" is often used to refer to the genre stylistically rather than denoting popularity.

Some artists and publications have advocated for a new name for the scene to differentiate it from other UK underground scenes. Lancey Foux, a pioneer of the style, has argued that "underground" as a label is "very restrictive", adding that "EsDeeKid is one of the biggest UK artists, so why would you call him underground?" Foux suggested the name "Overground" to describe the new scene and sound, the term being a reference to the London Overground train network. The Fader added that "[This] cohort has the goal of reshaping the overground in their distinct vision."

== History ==
=== 2021–2023: Origins ===
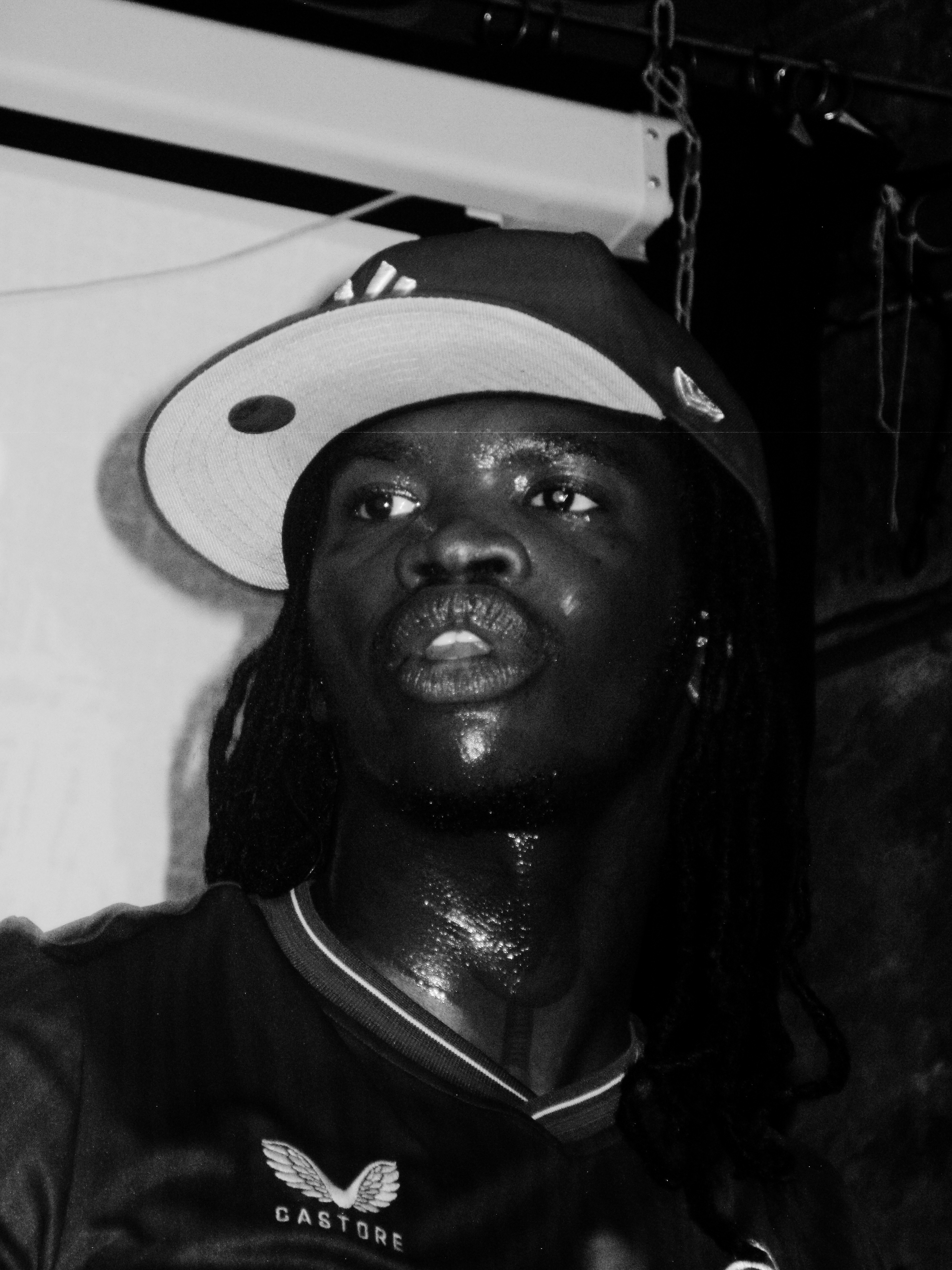
Stratford rapper Lancey Foux has been called "fundamental" to the scene's initial success and referred to as the "godfather" of the movement.

According to The Guardian, London rapper Lancey Foux was "fundamental" to the scene's initial growth and has been described as "The Godfather of UK UG". British DJ Kenny Allstar stated "He started in 2015, and couldn't be boxed in: not drill, or Afroswing, or trap. He was more outlandish with his approach to the music, using heavy melodic vibes with distorted beats. It created a new wave."

The scene began growing through the rising popularity of the plugg sound in 2021. The single "Arc'teryx" by Romford rapper YT has been cited as the song that "heralded the new scene's subsumption of American rap traditions mixed in with splashes of homegrown flavor".

South London rapper Zukovstheworld has been called a pioneer of the style. British magazine Dazed stated that "Zuko was UK Ug before UK Ug" and added that he "gave Fakemink some of his first features... hopped on Wraith9 beats long before Timothée Chalamet had ever heard of EsDeeKid, and has been fusing DIY punk and indie sensibilities with trap and rage beats as far back as 2022."

British rapper Phreshboyswag has been labelled as a key figure in the rise of the UK underground rap scene, although The Fader noted that he was more associated with the New York jerk revival scene.

=== 2024–2026: Rise to mainstream ===
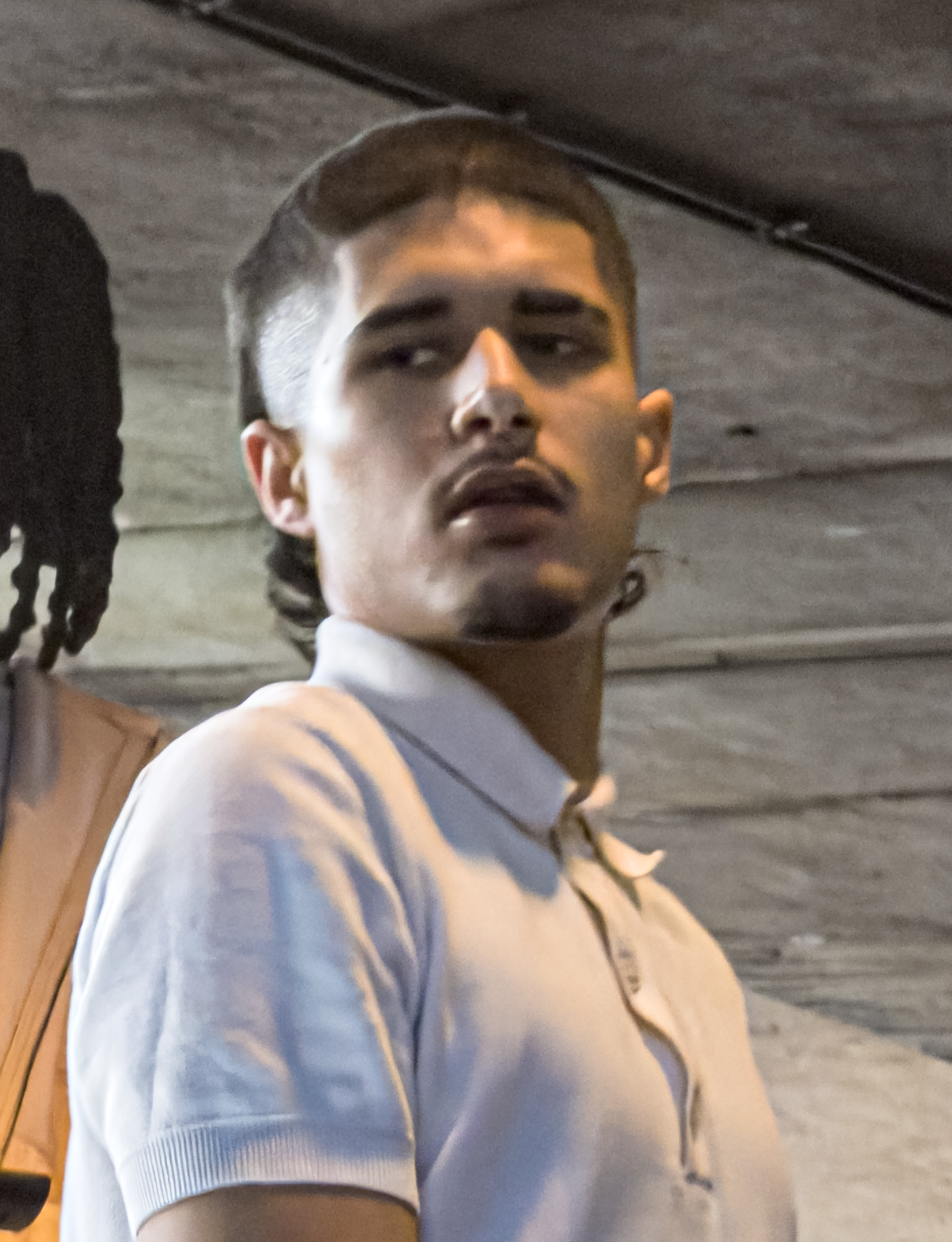
Essex rapper Fakemink has been called the face of the movement.

While rooted in the US, jerk music began to gain momentum in the UK in 2024. Led by artists like Fakemink, as well as YT with his single "Black and Tan", whose music video made use of the Frutiger Metro aesthetic. The song was dubbed a "crowning jewel" of the jerk revival, with the release being quickly followed by the single "Prada or Celine". English singer-songwriter PinkPantheress was later inspired by the music video's visual direction and collaborated with the video's director, Lauzza, for her future releases. YT's releases were followed by further major contributions in the genre by artists such as Jim Legxacy, EsDeeKid, Len, and Fimiguerrero.

The scene was further popularised by English rapper Fakemink, described as the "man-of-the-moment" by Dazed. Fakemink titled his debut mixtape London's Saviour because he wanted to "change" the London music scene which he had previously described as "all trash". He pioneered a microgenre dubbed "moody jerk" and has been labelled a "critical darling". In 2025, the scene gained wider attention with the commercial breakthrough of EsDeeKid, whose single "Phantom" reached the UK Top 20 and whose debut mixtape Rebel later became Spotify’s most streamed hip-hop album globally during November 2025. The Guardian stated that to the "outside world" EsDeeKid's rise "seemed to happen overnight". A month after Rebel released, Jim Legxacy released his critically acclaimed mixtape Black British Music (2025), which charted in 47 countries and peaked at number 3 on the UK R&B Chart.

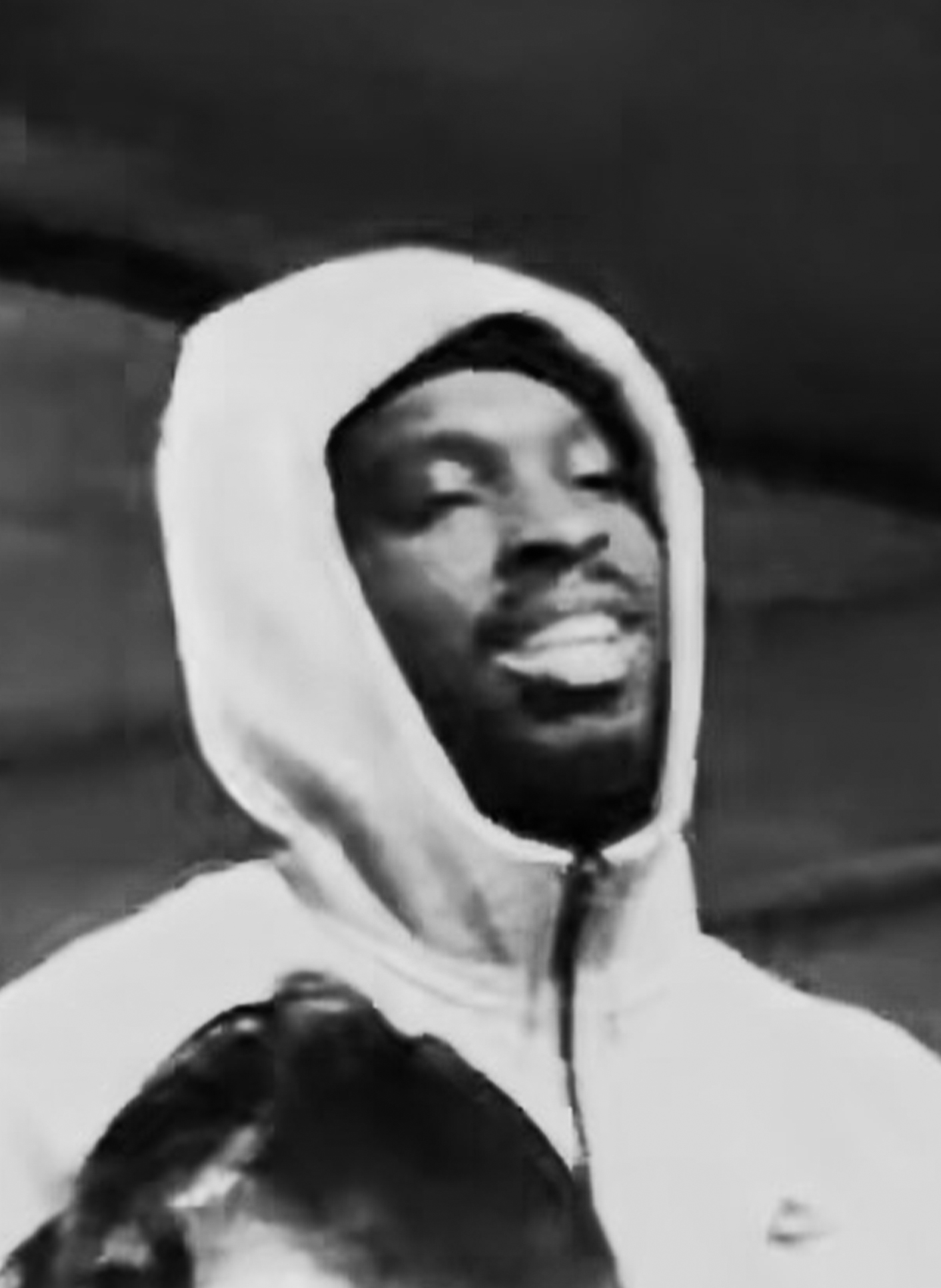
East London rapper Fimiguerrero has been credited with helping shape the scene's fusion of jerk and rage music.

On the music streaming service SoundCloud, UK underground rap listens rose by "nearly 300%" throughout 2025, making it the platform's fastest-growing rap movement in both the United Kingdom and the United States.

Several major publications, including The Wall Street Journal and The Guardian described the movement as a "new British Invasion", with the latter stating "with US rap in the doldrums, the time is ripe for another British Invasion". English rapper YT added "We know that we’re undeniable and that this shift is inevitable."

== Fashion and visual arts ==
The UK underground rap scene has been noted for having its own visual language and "cultural ecosystem." In 2026, Culted magazine stated that luxury brands were increasingly looking towards British underground artists when "searching for the next face of youth culture."

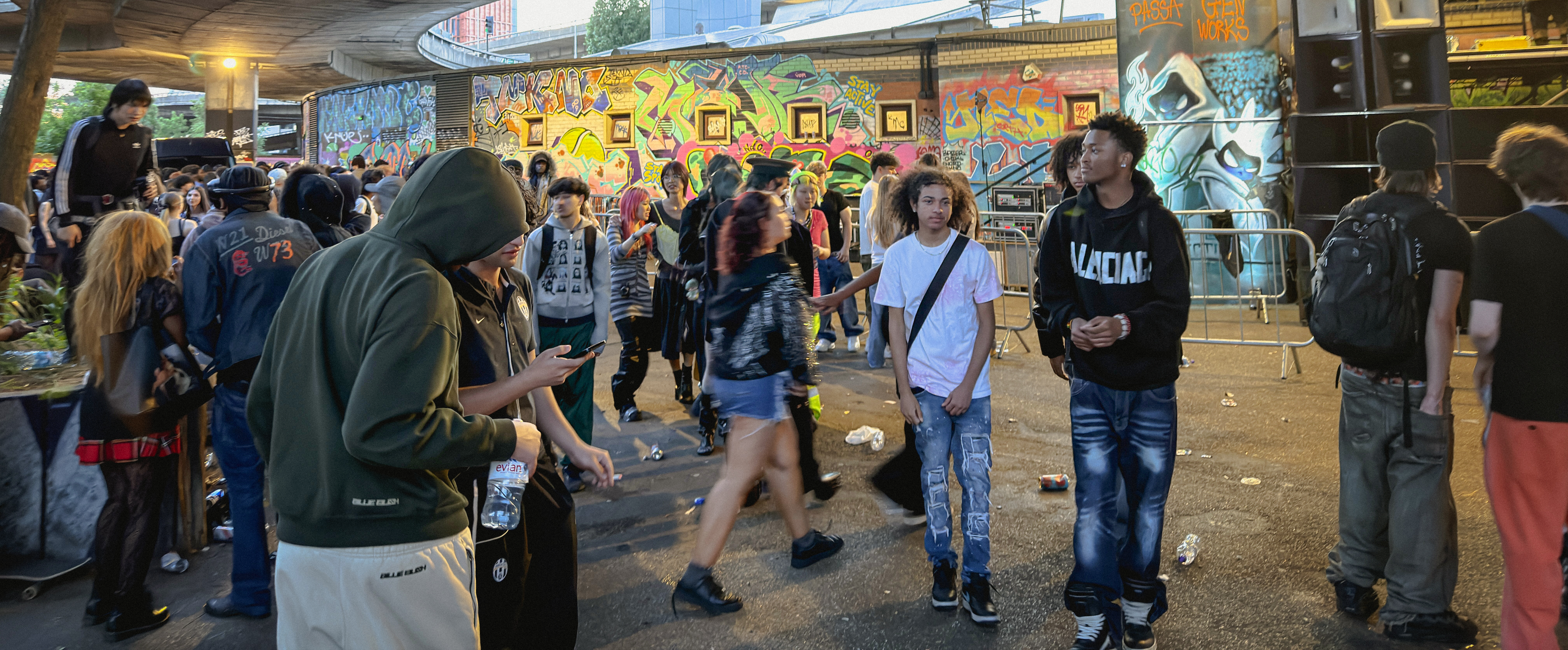
Concertgoers at a UK underground rap pop-up concert in London, 2026

The movement emphasises openness and a "punk approach" to creativity. Listeners of the genre typically wear dark, baggy outfits that take inspiration from the Cool Britannia, rage, scene and grime movements. Tartan patterns are sometimes implemented, largely due to the popularity of Fimiguerrero, Ledbyher and Pinkpantheress, who all make use of the pattern in their artwork. Photographer Mosy McDermott noted that "people in this subculture all have such diverse styles and looks" and that listeners and artists' outfits would often "represent a bit of their personality".

Figures in the movement have also operated as fashion designers to anchor their visual identities in music. For instance, North London rapper Elijah Aike runs his own independent clothing label called Aikeremiokha, which has been featured in London's underground subcultural runway showcases alongside other contemporary youth brands.

== Associated acts ==
Notable musical artists and producers associated with the scene include EsDeeKid, Fakemink, Rico Ace, Fimiguerrero, Feng, Lancey Foux, Jim Legxacy, Niko B, YT, Fixupboy, Skaiwater, Pixy, Yukan, Saam Sultan, SINN6R, Len Lucci, BXKS, PureSnow, Ledbyher, Kwes E, 5EB, Phreshboyswag, Chy Cartier, Zukovstheworld, TeeboFG, TR Gobrazy, Young Eman, Finessekid, Ciel, N4T, Ceebo, Slew, Oopsy, Llondon Actress, Nori, Moriah Mensah, Bloody Shield, 300SkullsAndCounting, Svn4vr, Cityboymoe, Snoa, Elijah Aike, Jawnino, and Wraith9.

Notable visual artists and directors associated with the scene include Laurie Lotus (known as "Lauzza"), Christian Thomas Irving (known as "CTi"), Rohan Dil, and directing duo "Burnermunde", which is composed of Arran Ashan and Mustafa Mohamoud.

Dean Blunt's experimental hip hop approach under the alias Babyfather has been cited as serving as an influence for modern internet rap artists, including Fakemink and American rapper Nettspend. Blunt blended subversion-heavy lofi elements and an independent, internet-native approach, which were adopted by UK underground artists.

Ashbeck and Zino Vinci are sometimes associated with the scene, though they typically operate within a distinct sub-genre focused on alternative UK hip-hop music rather than the plugg, rage or unorthodox experimentation of the UK underground movement.

Several high-profile musicians and public figures showed praise for artists associated with the scene during its rise, in particular for Fakemink, Jim Legxacy and EsDeeKid. This includes Drake, Frank Ocean, Playboi Carti, Clairo, Dave, Skepta, PinkPantheress, Timothée Chalamet, and Hunter Biden.

== Local scenes ==
=== London ===
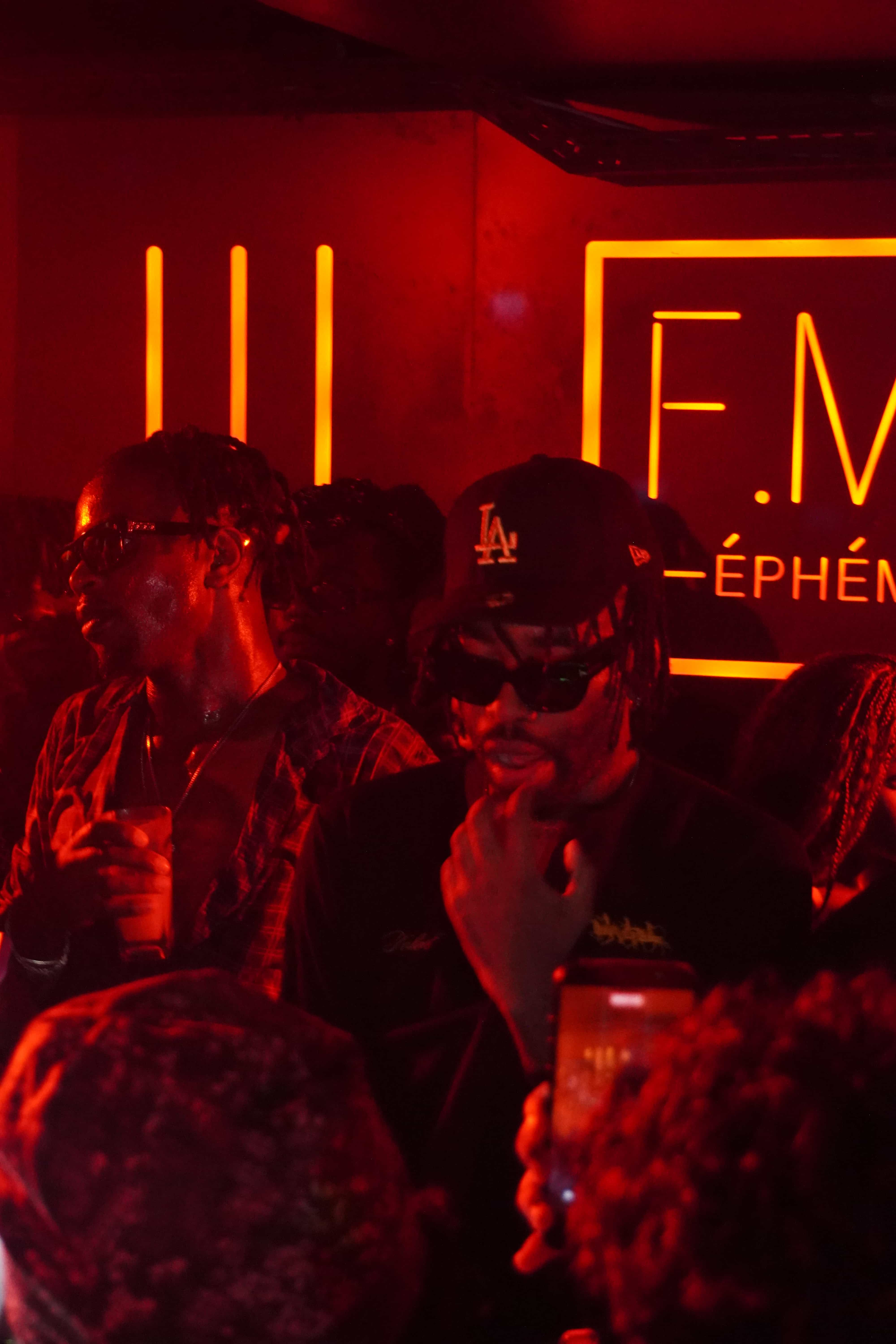
YT (left) and Len Lucci (right) are two UKUG rappers from London known for jerk and afrobeats inspired music, respectively

London is the most influential city within the UK underground scene, with many of its most significant contributions originating from South and East London. However, the scene is notable for producing successful acts from across the city and from a wide range of ethnic backgrounds. Artists associated with the scene include Jim Legxacy from Lewisham, YT from Havering, Fimiguerrero from Greenwich, and Ledbyher from Norfolk.

Local identity is a recurring theme among London's artists, many of whom frequently reference their local culture and environment. This includes the London boroughs, public transport systems such as the London Underground rail lines, the "London Look" by Rimmel London, the city's weather, and everyday life in the capital. Examples include Jim Legxacy's single Cold Lewisham Roses, Fakemink's mixtape London's Saviour, YT's single Take Me Back To London Where It's Raining, among others.

London is also a major hub in the counterculture movement associated with the UK underground, with major influences on the scene's fashion, graphic design and politics. "This is the time to be young in London" is a common sentiment among members of the movement.

=== Leicester ===
Snoa, from Leicester, has been labelled by The Guardian as "prolific even by the standards of underground rap", and noted him for releasing a considerable amount of music while keeping it at a "remarkably high level". He released the album 2il De4th Du Us 7art in 2025 which became "a classic of the cloud-rap genre". His music has drawn comparisons to Playboi Carti, Che, Bladee and OsamaSon.

=== Hertfordshire ===
Svn4vr is a singer-songwriter from Hertfordshire whose personal lyrics often explore his Christian faith. In a review for Pitchfork, his mixtape Herts On Fire was noted for its spontaneous vocalisation while describing his songwriting as "DAW-native".

Another musician associated with the area is Nori, hailing from the city of St Albans. His musical style is characterised by video game textures inspired by The Legend of Zelda, and he also cites Wiley as an influence.

=== Yorkshire ===
Young Eman is a rapper hailing from the city of Sheffield, who gained initial traction from the single "Popstar in da Bits", and whose aesthetic choices are drawn from early 2000s youth culture. In a review for NME, his debut mixtape Bine is characterised by sounds of electronica, trance, rage and trap, adding that he finds "beauty in the chaos" of the project's aggressive production.

=== Scotland ===
Scotland's most notable underground rapper is Bloody Shield, hailing from Fife. Dazed have noted that his music takes inspiration from Skrillex, Flux Pavilion and Dizzee Rascal. In 2026, he released the mixtape Year of the Horse, which blends sounds of electronic, hardcore, emo rap and grime delivered in his native Scottish accent.

== Notable releases ==
- Rebel, a mixtape by EsDeeKid.
- Black British Music (2025), a mixtape by Jim Legxacy.
- OI!, a mixtape by YT.
- What The Feng, an EP by Feng.
- CONGLOMERATE, a collaborative mixtape by Fimiguerrero, Len Lucci, and Lancey Foux.
- Terrified, a studio album by Fakemink.
- #FEDERAL, an album by SINN6R.
- "Easter Pink", a single by Fakemink.
- "LV Sandals", a single by EsDeeKid, Fakemink and Rico Ace.
- Fingers Crossed, a mixtape by Kwes E.
- The Elephant, a mixtape by Ledbyher.
- Amnesia, a collaborative album by Jawnino and Surf Gang.

== See also ==
- SoundCloud rap
- Alternative hip-hop
- British Invasion
- Second British Invasion
- Third British Invasion
- Bassline
- Road rap
