= Kwes E =

British rapper and record producer

- Born: Elorm Kwesi Ahorsu; October 2000 (age 26); Ghana
- Origin: Canterbury, Kent, England
- Genres: UK Underground; Jerk; plugg; Alternative R&B; alté
- Occupations: Rapper; songwriter; record producer; audio engineer
- Years active: 2019-present
- Label: Independent
- Website: https://vowelism.store/

Elorm Kwesi Ahorsu (born October 2000), known professionally as Kwes E (stylised in lowercase), is a British rapper and music producer from Canterbury, Kent. He initially gained recognition with projects such as "Juggin" and his 2025 studio album, Fingers Crossed. He has been associated with the UK Underground scene working closely with fellow rapper YT, and his musical style has been described as a fusion of jerk rap, R&B and alté with West African percussion.

== Early life ==
Ahorsu grew up in a Ghanaian household in Kent, having moved there at the age of five, and started producing his own beats during his late teens using borrowed equipment from a friend. While attending grammar school, he belonged to a tight-knit musical circle collaborating with students, which included singer PinkPantheress from the neighbouring girls' school.

== Career ==
Ahorsu began making music in 2019. In August 2020, he released his debut mixtape E.T: Volume One, in collaboration with YT. Dazed noted the project as a debut to "the UK's bouncy alt-rap scene", comparing the track "Pint w the Lads" to West Coast hip-hop.

Ahorsu gained wider attention in May 2022 when Pitchfork featured his single "Crocodile Tears" in The Ones column, comparing its melancholic atmosphere to Drain Gang.

On 6 March 2025, Ahorsu was featured in PlaqueBoyMax's UK Underground livestream alongside other music figures including YT, Jim Legxacy, Fimiguerrero and Len Lucci.

In October 2025, Ahorsu released the studio album Fingers Crossed. In a review for Pitchfork, critic Olivier Lafontant gave it a rating of 6.7 out of 10 and commended his "knack for earworms" and Pan-African themes while noting repetition in his lyrics. The project peaked at number 8 on the UK Independent Album Breakers Chart and number 9 on the UK Hip Hop and R&B Albums Chart, spending two weeks on the latter.

== Artistry ==
Pitchfork highlighted that the tracks on Fingers Crossed utilise auto-tune, synthesizers and afrobeats. Additionally, critics compared Ahorsu's lyrics to Meek Mill, alongside musical inspiration from jerk, amapiano and highlife.

Ahorsu has also cited Lucki, Drake, Skepta, Kendrick Lamar and Big L as influences to his music.

== Discography ==
=== Studio albums ===
Title	Details
Off Topic	Released: 29 November 2024; Formats: Digital download, streaming
Fingers Crossed	Released: 17 October 2025; Formats: CD, Digital download, streaming
