= Waves (Killa Ki and Lancey Foux song) =

2019 song by Killa Ki and Lancey Foux

Song by Killa Ki ft Lancey Foux
- Released: December 20, 2019
- Recorded: 2019
- Studio: Fumez The Engineer studio
- Genre: New wave, hip hop, rap
- Length: 3:54
- Songwriter(s): Killa Ki, Lancey Foux
- Producer(s): J Merlin

"Waves" is song performed by Killa Ki. The song features the notable Lancey Foux. The song was written by Killa Ki and Lancey Foux and produced by J Merlin and engineered by Fumez the Engineer. The song is a mid-tempo new wave hip hop song that uses a varied instrumentation, including keyboards and Latin percussion. The song was released in December 2019 in the United Kingdom as the sixth track on the Farda album which was Killa Ki last album before venturing into the Fashion industry studying for his master's degree.

== Background ==
This is the first time Killa Ki and Lancey Foux collaborated on a song, In 2015 Lancey Foux said in his interview with Videl Holness that Killa Ki had a big influence on him which explains the sense of realness and love of luxury and fashion. The song delves into themes of extravagance, hedonism, and self-assured confidence. The lyrics paint a vivid picture of a lifestyle filled with opulence, partying, and a sense of invincibility.

The song is composed in the key of E minor, with a time signature set in common time, and moves at a moderate tempo of 120 beats per minute.
