= YT (rapper) =

British rapper (born 2001)

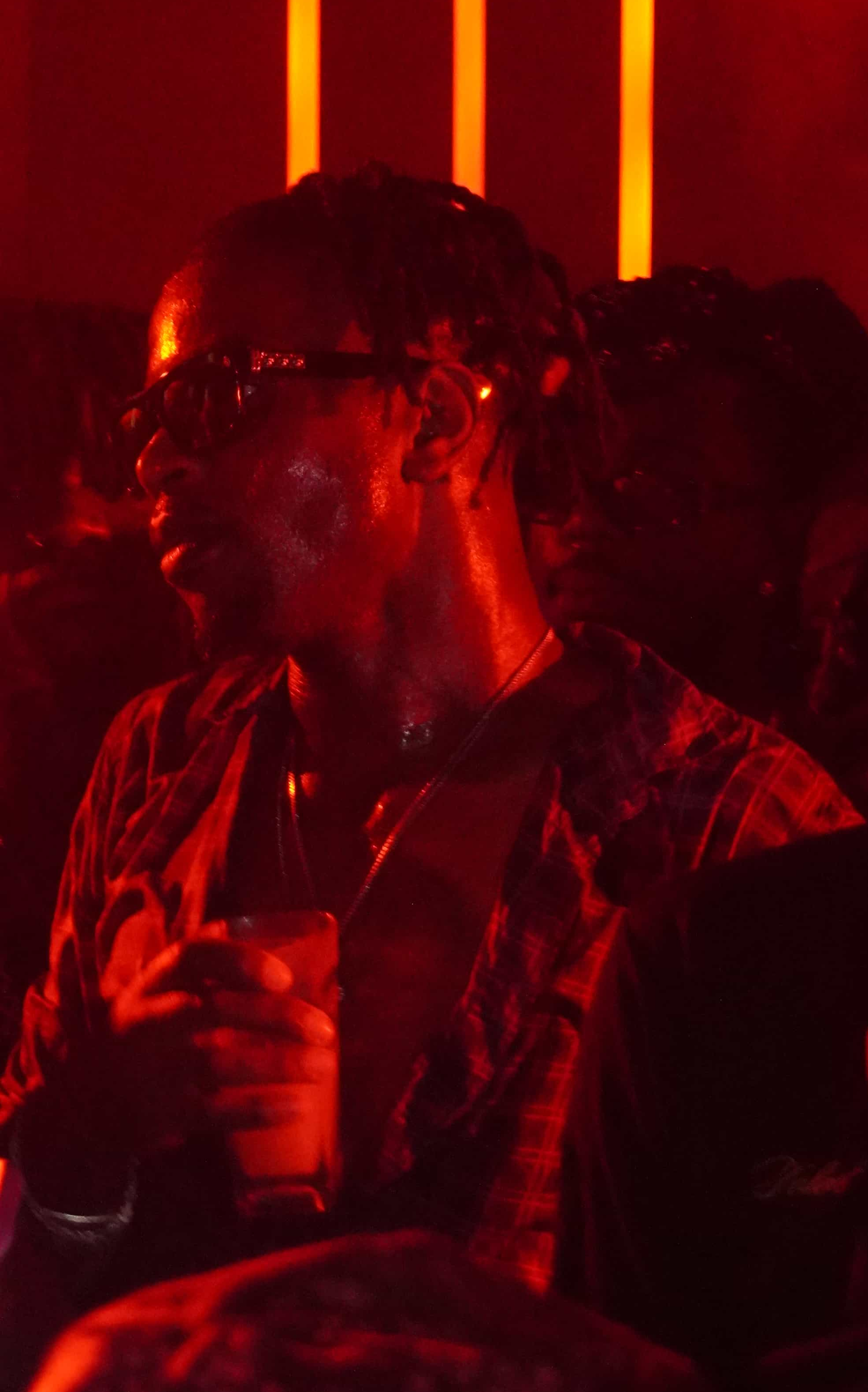
- Fola-Alade in 2026

Background information
- Also known as: Tolafola, Yung Tolz
- Born: Oluwatola Joseph Fola-Alade; May 5, 2001 (age 25); Romford, East London, England
- Genres: Jerk; Overground; plugg; trap
- Occupations: Rapper, songwriter
- Years active: 2016–present
- Label: Independent
- Website: tolafola.me

Oluwatola Joseph Fola-Alade (born May 5, 2001), known professionally as YT, is a British rapper, producer and songwriter from Romford, East London. He first gained popularity in 2021 with his viral single "Arc'teryx", and later through jerk music and becoming a pioneer in the UK underground rap scene.

== Early life and education ==
Fola-Alade was raised in a Nigerian family in East London. He attended Harrow School and later studied Philosophy and French at the University of Oxford, graduating in 2023.

== Career ==
In 2016, YT began making music as a teenager, recording on GarageBand and voice memos, while rapping on "type beats" found on YouTube. Later attending the University of Oxford, YT continued releasing material.

YT's wider public breakthrough came with the 2021 single "Arc'teryx", referencing the Canadian clothing company of the same name. The song went viral online, with Pitchfork selecting the single for its "The Ones" spotlight that same year. In 2023, YT released the mixtape #STILLSWAGGIN and later the album Real Life. Directly following his graduation period, he also released the single "The One (Just Got My Degree)".

In late 2024, YT released "Black & Tan" (featuring Lancey Foux), which was followed by a music video that garnered attention online due to its use of Y2K aesthetics. The song was described by NME as a "boisterous new-age jerk classic", and was followed by the single "Prada or Celine". In 2025, Dazed described YT as one of the leading artists of the "new UK rap revolution", "owning UK rap's swag" by the Fader, while Washington Square News labelled him "the future of UK rap".

On March 6, 2025, YT appeared alongside UK rap contemporaries Len, Fimiguerrero, Jim Legxacy and Kwes E on a Twitch live stream hosted by PlaqueBoyMax. On March 20, 2025, PlaqueBoyMax released 5$tar Sessions: London, an EP that included "1000 (spin again)," the song YT recorded on the live stream.

On March 28, 2025, YT released the mixtape OI!. The album was produced by fellow UK rapper/producer Kwes E. Dazed Magazine said OI! was "at the cutting edge of UK rap sonics,..." but "also a big old throwback." Kyann-Sian Williams rated the album four out of five stars wrote for NME that OI! "is YT at his most electrifying" but that "five mixtapes deep, that same rush is starting to feel like it could soon start to pack less of a punch."

== Artistry ==
=== Influences and musical style ===
YT is one of the faces of the 2020s UK underground hip-hop scene and has been compared to his peers in the genre. YT's digital sound is similar to other British artists like Fimiguerrero, Len, and Lancey Foux. His music often draws from American 2010s jerk rap, with other influences from rage and plugg rap. The first music YT grew up listening to was gospel music, but he says that all types of music inspire him. YT credits the 2016 XXL Freshman Class and SoundCloud rap era as being the impetus for his desire to make music. He began making music while bored in the summer and rapped over "type beats" he'd find on YouTube and use GarageBand on his mom's laptop when she was away to make songs to post to SoundCloud. YT says some of his biggest individual inspirations in music are Playboi Carti, Xaviersobased, Yhapojj, Young Sam, The Rej3ctz, Marvel Inc and Kanye West.

=== Visual style ===
YT, along with much of the UK underground hip-hop scene, is often associated with Y2K visual aesthetics. The 2023 music video for "#PURRR," directed by British video director Lauzza, borrows heavily from American music videos of the 2000s and early 2010s. Other Lauzza directed videos, including "Prada and Celine", "MVP" with Fimiguerrero and "Black & Tan" featuring Lancey Foux, borrow from Frutiger Metro aesthetics, with the former being based on menus and gameplay from the 2005 basketball video game NBA Street V3.

== Discography ==
=== Albums ===
Title	Album details
Cul De Trap	Released: September 5, 2019; Label: Self-released; Format: Digital download, streaming
e.t: volume one	Released: August 13, 2020; Label: Self-released; Format: Digital download, streaming
Tmilli	Released: October 7, 2021; Label: Self-released; Format: Digital download, streaming
Real Life	Released: February 10, 2023; Label: Self-released; Format: Digital download, streaming

=== Mixtapes ===
Title	Album details
#STILLSWAGGIN	Released: October 23, 2023; Label: Self-released; Format: Digital download, streaming
OI!	Released: March 28, 2025; Label: Self-released; Format: Digital download, streaming, CD, LP

=== Extended plays ===
Title	EP details
Unprotected Flex	Released: 2018; Label: Self-released; Format: Digital download, streaming
Game Over	Released: 2018; Label: Self-released; Format: Digital download, streaming
Sss < / 3	Released: 2019; Label: Self-released; Format: Digital download, streaming
Unprotected Flex Vol. 2	Released: 2019; Label: Self-released; Format: Digital download, streaming
Sss2 < / 3	Released: 2021; Label: Self-released; Format: Digital download, streaming
C2rcn	Released: 2021; Label: Self-released; Format: Digital download, streaming
Nowhere to Go	Released: 2022; Label: Self-released; Format: Digital download, streaming
#SWAGRENAISSANCE	Released: 2023; Label: Self-released; Format: Digital download, streaming
#B4OI!	Released: 2025; Label: Self-released; Format: Digital download, streaming

== Awards and nominations ==
Award	Year	Category	Nominee(s) / Work(s)	Results
MOBO Awards	2026	Best Newcomer	Himself	Nominated
