= Notion (magazine) =

Music magazine and fashion magazine

- October 2017 cover featuring Demi Lovato
- Editor: Kitty Robson
- Categories: Music; fashion; culture
- Frequency: Bi-annual
- Publisher: Notion London Limited
- Total circulation: 65,000
- Founded: 2004
- Based in: United Kingdom & United States
- Language: English
- Website: notion.online
- ISSN: 1745-1760
- OCLC: 225922027

Notion is a globally distributed, bi-annual music and fashion magazine, founded in 2004.

== About ==
Notion was founded by Billy Hussein (Managing Director), alternatively known as Billy Notion, and Nicholas Douglas (Creative Director). Contributors to the magazine also write for other publications including The Guardian, Drowned In Sound, Pop Justice and The Huffington Post.

The magazine has an established 'Introducing' section featuring up-and-coming artists alongside new music and fashion stories. The centre section of the magazine includes longer music features, notably in-depth interviews with established artists and fashion editorials. The last section of the magazine is devoted to culture and one-off features. Artists to have been previously featured on the cover include Demi Lovato, Miley Cyrus, Pharrell Williams, Adam Lambert, Lindsay Lohan, Ariana Grande, Joey Badass, The Weeknd, Bastille, Bruno Mars, Jessie J, Pixie Lott and Carly Rae Jepsen.

== Notion New Music Awards ==
Notion launched an award ceremony in 2025, titled the Notion New Music Awards. The accolades are voted for by a panel of "respected voices across music and culture" and intend to celebrate upcoming talent within the British music industry.

=== 2025 winners ===
Best New Pop	Best New Rap / Hip-Hop
Say Now; Alessi Rose; Chloe Qisha; Erin LeCount; Girl Group	Pozer; FinesseKid; Frozemode; Killowen; Ledbyher
Best New Alternative	Best New Afrobeats / Amapiano
Bricknasty; Beattie; TTSSFU; Unflirt; Westside Cowboy	Brazy; Bloody Civilian; Elestee; Nqobilé; Skyla Tylaa
Best New Electronic	Best New R&B
Silva Bumpa; Amaliah; Cheetah; KTmelodies; Mia Koden	Demae; Anaiis; BINA.; Dré Six; Skye Newman
Best New Jazz / Funk / Soul
Sekou; Ife Ogunjobi; Ni Maxine; Poppy Daniels; Sienna Spiro
