= Culture of London =

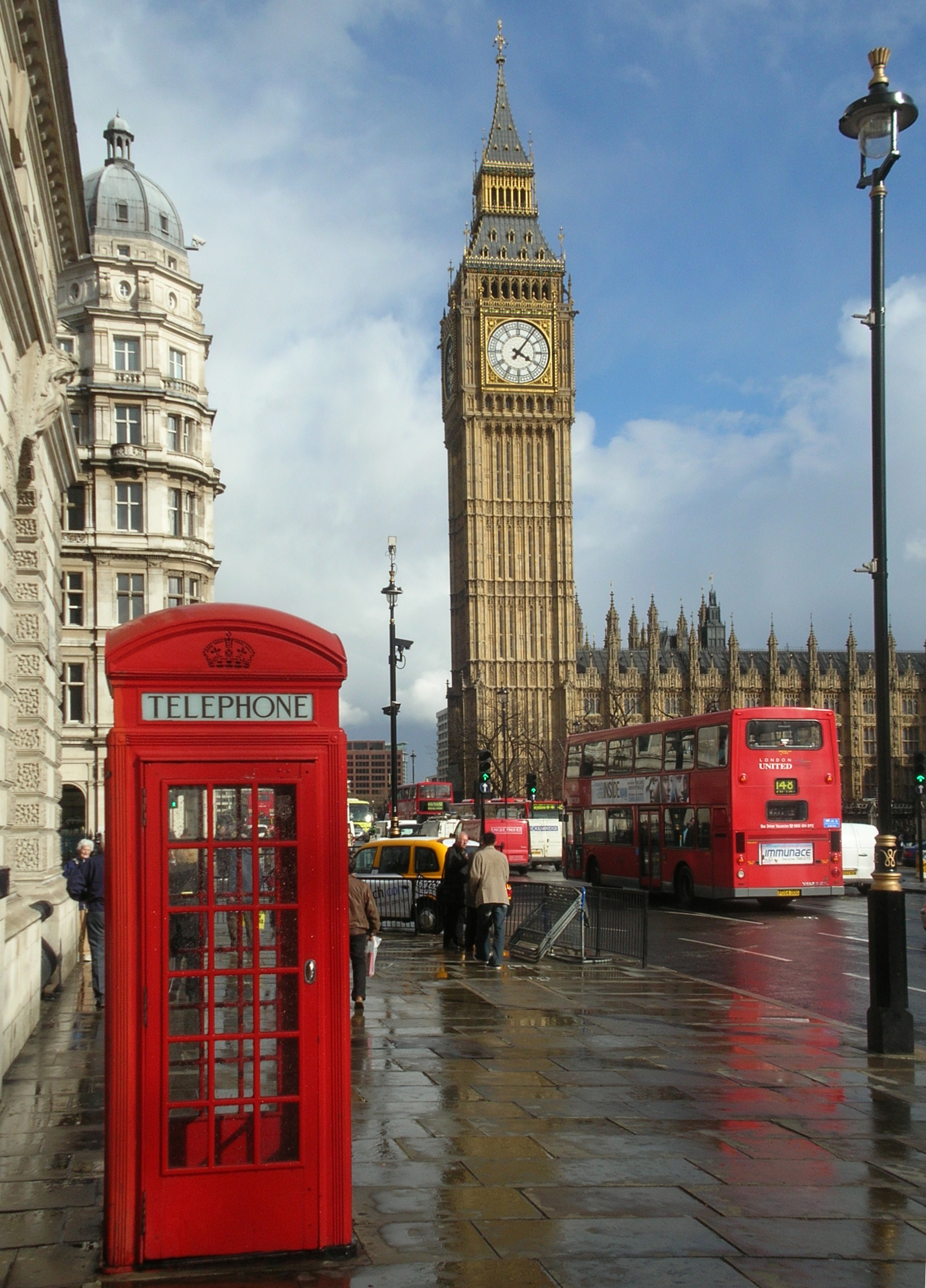
Three cultural icons of London: a K2 red telephone box, Big Ben and a red double-decker bus

The urban culture of London concerns the music, museums, festivals, and lifestyle within London, the capital city of the United Kingdom. The city is known for its theatre quarter, and its West End theatre district has given the name to "West End theatre", the strand of mainstream professional theatre staged in the large theatres in London. London is also home to cultural attractions such as the British Museum, the Tate Galleries, the National Gallery, the Notting Hill Carnival, and The O2.

London has, alongside New York, been described as the cultural capital of the world.

Through music, comedy and theatre. London has a nightlife with approximately 25.6 events per thousand people with 44.1% of those events being theatre based.

A variety of landmarks and objects are cultural icons associated with London, such as Big Ben, Buckingham Palace, and the tube map. Many other British cultural icons are strongly associated with London in the minds of visiting tourists, including the red telephone box, the AEC Routemaster bus, the black taxi, and the Union Flag.

The city is home to many nationalities, and the diversity of cultures has shaped the city's culture over time.

== Music ==
=== Classical and opera ===
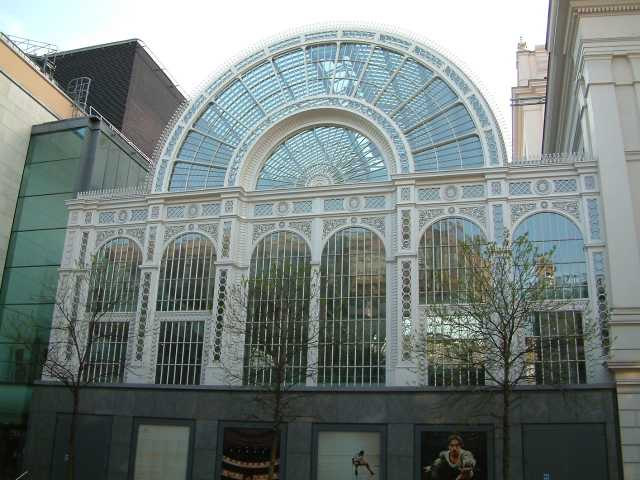
Floral Hall of the Royal Opera House

There are three major concert halls in the capital. One of these is the Barbican Hall at Barbican Centre; which is home to the London Symphony Orchestra (LSO) and BBC Symphony Orchestra. The Royal Festival Hall, based at the South Bank Centre along with the Queen Elizabeth Hall and the Hayward Gallery is home to the London Philharmonic Orchestra (LPO), and the Philharmonia. The final and largest of all venues is the Royal Albert Hall, which hosts the BBC Proms each summer. The Royal Philharmonic Orchestra (RPO) is also based in London at Cadogan Hall. Founded in 1994, the London Metropolitan Orchestra is a studio orchestra specialising in sound recordings of film music for British and international film and television productions.

There are also several chamber orchestras, some of which specialise in period instrument performances, including the Orchestra of the Age of Enlightenment, and the Academy of St Martin in the Fields. Chamber music venues include the Purcell Room at the South Bank Centre; the Wigmore Hall and Smith Square Hall.

A number of choirs have originated in London, varying in size and musical style. Among the city's large symphonic concert choirs are the London Philharmonic Choir and London Symphony Chorus, which have their origins as the choral sections of the LPO and the LSO, the London Chorus, London Voices and the Bach Choir. Smaller vocal groups in London include the Holst Singers and the choir of the English Concert. There is also a long tradition of choral singing in Christian churches and cathedrals, and among the choirs associated with London churches are the choirs of St Paul's Cathedral, Westminster Abbey and Westminster Cathedral, which sing daily services.

The Royal Opera House at Covent Garden is home to the Royal Opera and the Royal Ballet companies. The other main opera company is the English National Opera at the London Coliseum. In the summer opera is performed in a temporary pavilion by Opera Holland Park, and there are occasional performances by visiting opera companies and small freelance professional opera companies.

=== Popular music ===
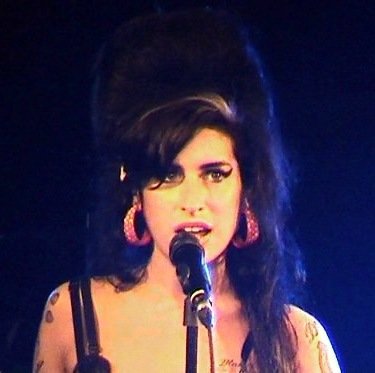
Amy Winehouse was a singer-songwriter from Southgate, north London.

London is famous for its rock scene, and was the starting point of some of the greatest 60s and 70s artists such as David Bowie, Iron Maiden, The Clash, Led Zeppelin, Renaissance, Fleetwood Mac, the Sex Pistols, The Who, Pink Floyd, Queen and popular 90s acts like Blur and Coldplay. Most major bands' tours will pass through London as well, favourite venues being the Brixton Academy, the O2 Arena, and the Hammersmith Apollo.

In addition to spawning the bands mentioned above, London, in its capacity as the UK's cultural centre, has served as the base of a number of internationally important acts, including The Beatles (see Abbey Road) and Elton John, as well as being instrumental in the birth of dance music.

London is also known for spawning numerous successful pop acts, including the Spice Girls, Cliff Richard, The Rolling Stones, One Direction and Little Mix.

London also has a thriving urban scene, mainly throughout the 21st century. Soul singers like Amy Winehouse and Lemar have found themselves chart, and international success. R&B singers such as the Sugababes, Leona Lewis, Taio Cruz, Adele, Dua Lipa, Rita Ora, Jessie J, Little Mix, Jay Sean and Alexandra Burke are also extremely popular. London also has a strong rap scene; rappers including Wiley and Dizzee Rascal among others.

London has had many thriving underground scenes throughout history. Genres include UK garage, drum and bass, dubstep, grime and UK underground.

== Festivals ==
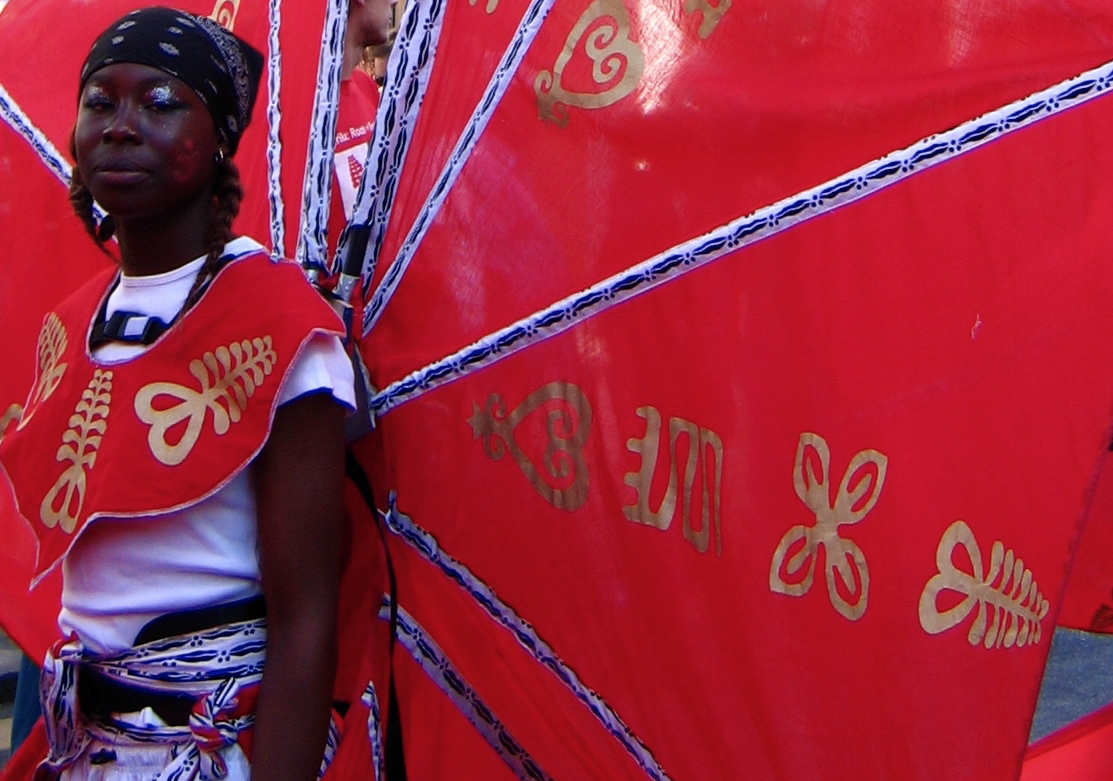
Girl in costume at the Notting Hill Carnival

London hosts several festivals, fairs and carnivals throughout the year with over 40 free festivals each year. The most famous is the Notting Hill Carnival, the world's second largest carnival. The carnival takes place over the August bank holiday weekend, and attracts almost 1 million people. It has a distinctly Afro-Caribbean flavour, and highlights include a competition between London's steelpan bands and a 3-mile street parade with dancing and music.

London also hosts the Carnaval Del Pueblo, Europe's greatest Latin American Festival, held on the first Sunday of August each year. Seven countries participate in this street procession, which ends in Burgess Park. Live music, dance, and Funfairs go up to 9:30 pm.

There are also large parades held on Saint George's Day (23 April) and Saint Patrick's Day (17 March). The Dance Umbrella is held every October, and features a variety of dance companies putting on displays across London. In addition there are many smaller fairs and parades, including the Christmas Without Cruelty Fayre, a fair held annually to promote animal rights.

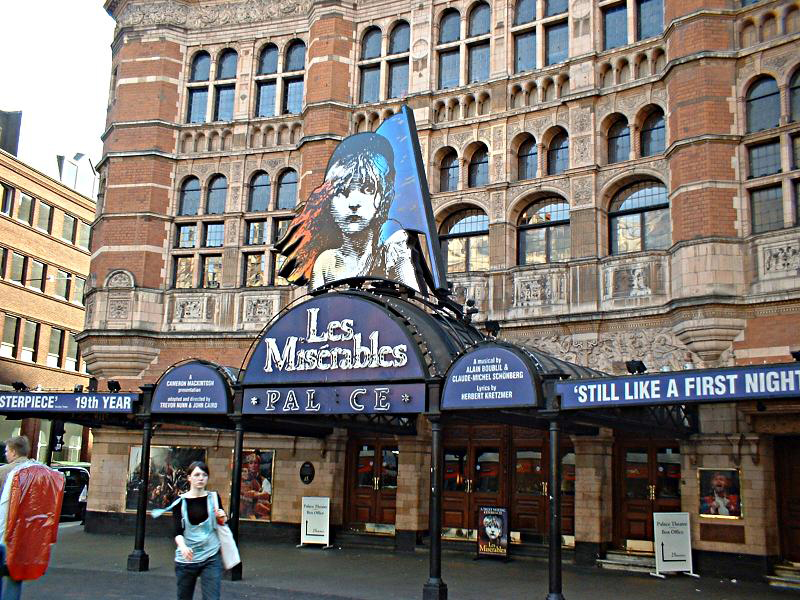
Les Misérables at the Palace Theatre

== Theatre and dance ==
There are over three dozen major theatres, most concentrated in the West End. West End theatres are commercial ventures that host predominantly Musical Theatre shows but genres such as comedy and serious drama are sometimes shown. The subsidised or non-commercial theatre is vibrant in the capital with theatres like the National Theatre and Shakespeare's Globe both of which are based on the South Bank, the Barbican in the city, the Royal Court Theatre in Chelsea which specialises in new drama, and the Old Vic; and Young Vic, both in Lambeth. The Royal Shakespeare Company which is based in Stratford, presents seasons in London as well. Smaller fringe theatres like Battersea Arts Centre, Bloomsbury Theatre, Almeida Theatre and Tricycle Theatre are also popular.

The capital also boasts a successful dance and physical theatre scene, home to two ballet companies; the Royal Ballet based at the Royal Opera House and English National Ballet based in Kensington, performing at the London Coliseum. Sadler's Wells Theatre on Rosebery Avenue in Islington exclusively shows dance performances throughout the year ranging from existing and new contemporary companies, musical theatre, and touring ballet companies. Dance performances also take place at the Barbican Centre, Peacock Theatre (Sadler's Wells), and the Queen Elizabeth Hall. Rambert, Richard Alston Dance Company, Candoco, and Siobhan Davies Dance are all based in London as well as choreographers such as Matthew Bourne, Wayne McGregor, Lloyd Newson, and Hofesh Shechter also basing their companies within the capital.

== Cinema ==
=== Film ===
London has been used frequently both as a filming location and as a film setting. These have ranged from historical recreations of the Victorian London of Charles Dickens and Sherlock Holmes, to the romantic comedies of Bridget Jones's Diary and Notting Hill, by way of crime films, spy thrillers, science fiction and the "swinging London" films of the 1960s.

Because of the dominant role played by the city in the British media, many British films are set in London. It has also been used many times in American films, and often recreated on a Hollywood studio backlot.

=== Cinemas and film festivals ===
The first screening of a film in the United Kingdom and London was at the Regent Street Cinema, which first opened in 1896. Today, there are several cinemas in London including the Prince Charles Cinema, the reopened Regent Street Cinema and BFI Southbank, and the Peckhamplex. London hosts and has hosted several film festivals, including the London Film Festival.

Several cinemas and film festivals in London are dedicated to showing films associated with specific communities, including the London Indian Film Festival and EbonyLife Place.

== Museums and art galleries ==
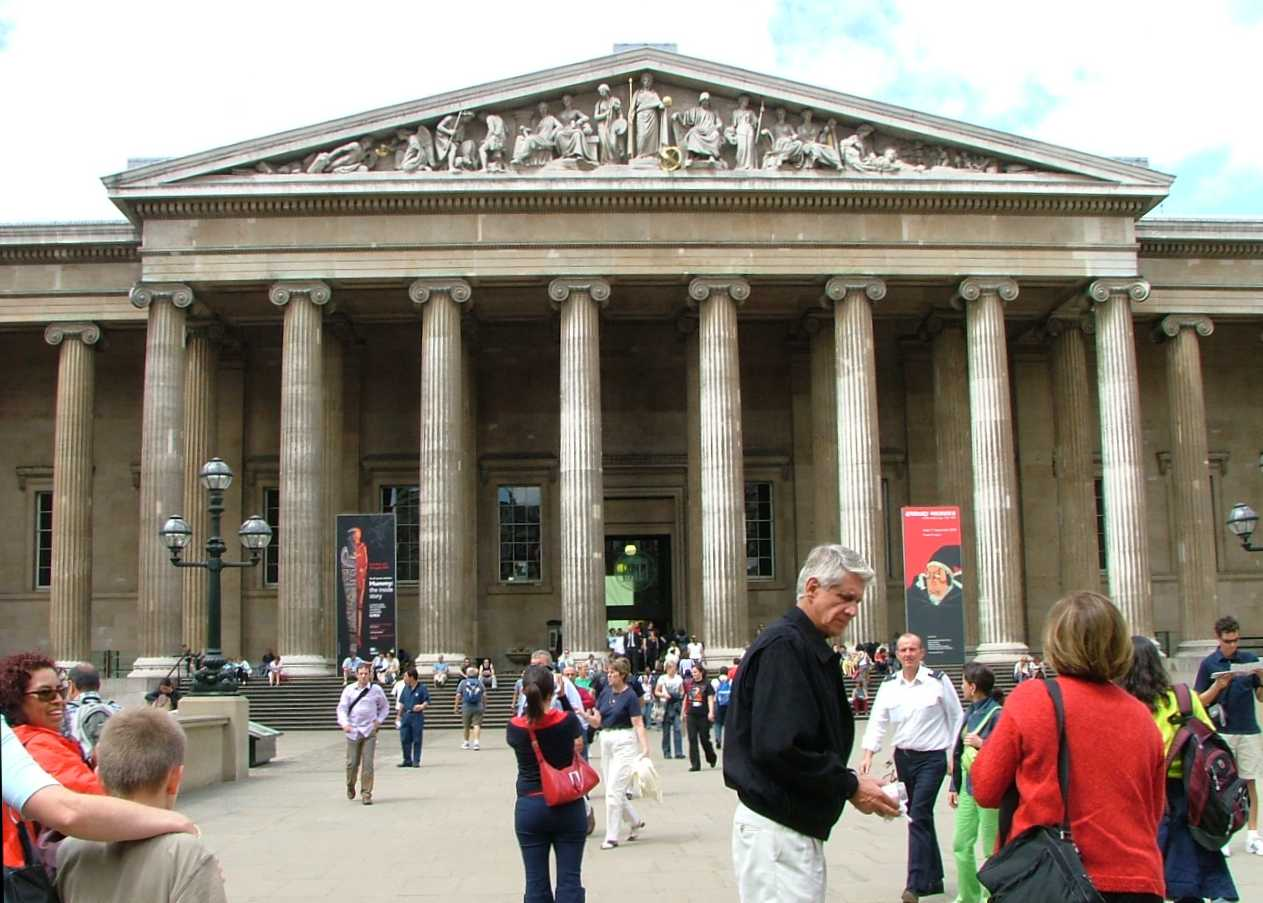
Main entrance to the British Museum

London is home to over 240 museums, galleries, and other institutions, many of which are free of admission charges and are major tourist attractions as well as playing a research role. The first of these to be established was the British Museum in Bloomsbury, in 1753. Originally containing antiquities, natural history specimens and the national library, the museum now has 8 million artefacts from around the globe. Also of eighteenth-century foundation is the Royal Academy of Arts; its summer exhibition has been an annual fixture on the London social calendar since 1769.

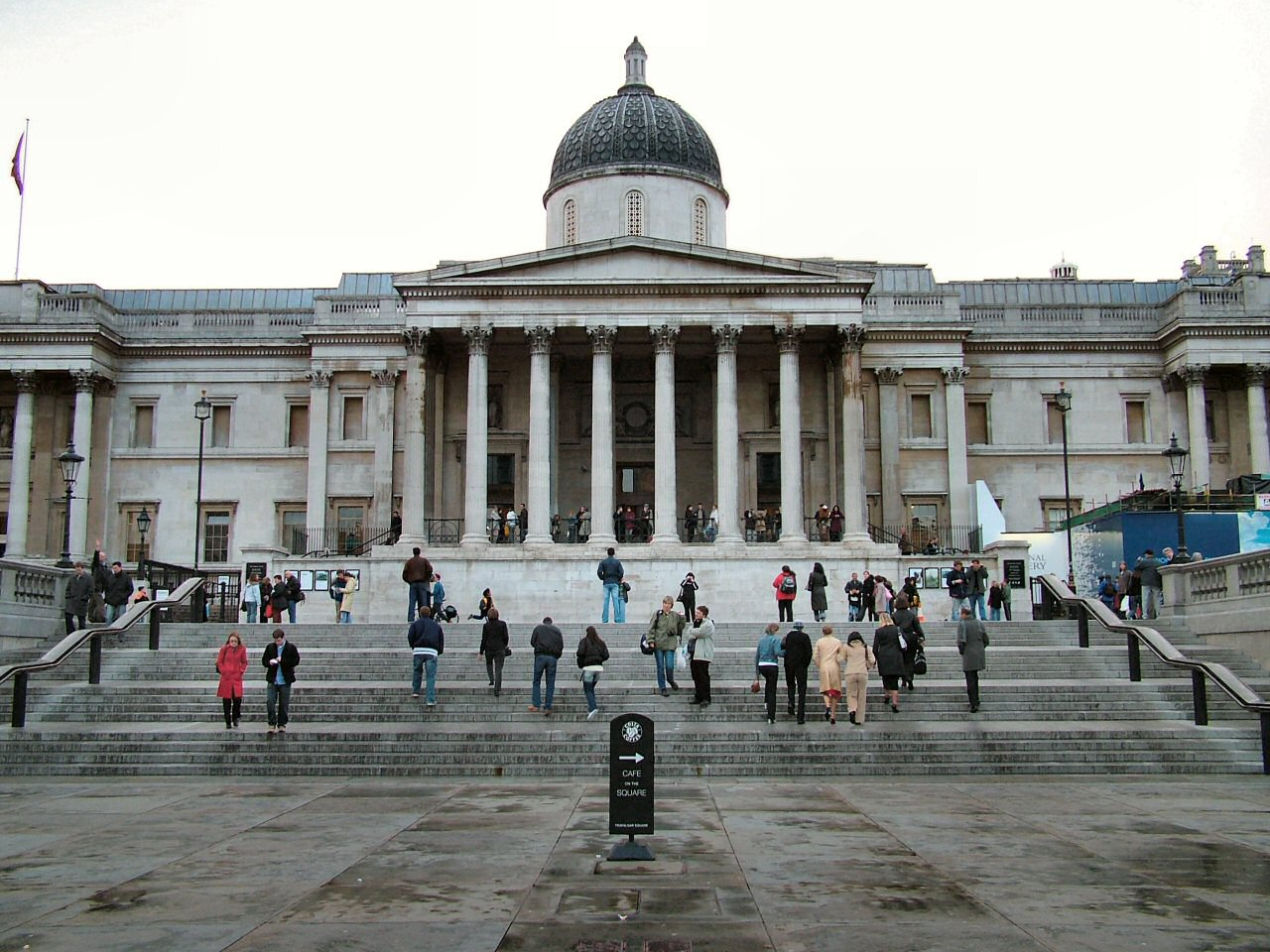
The National Gallery from Trafalgar Square

In 1824 the National Gallery, London was founded to house the British National collection of Western Art to 1900, and now occupies a prominent position in Trafalgar Square.

Other major collections of pre-1900 art are The Wallace Collection; the Courtauld Gallery at the Courtauld Institute of Art; and Dulwich Picture Gallery. The national collection of post-1900 art is at Tate Modern and the national collection of British Art is at Tate Britain. The National Portrait Gallery has a major collection dedicated to prominent British people from all periods. The Royal Academy's temporary exhibitions are also important.

In addition to Tate Modern major contemporary art venues include White Cube, the Saatchi Gallery, and The ICA.

In the latter half of the nineteenth century the locale of South Kensington was developed as "Albertopolis", a cultural and scientific quarter. Three major national museums are located there: the Victoria and Albert Museum (for the applied and Decorative arts), the Natural History Museum and the Science Museum. The national gallery of British art is at Tate Britain, originally established as an annexe of the National Gallery in 1897. The Tate Gallery, as it was formerly known, also became a major centre for modern art; in 2000 this collection moved to Tate Modern, a new gallery housed in the former Bankside Power Station. London's museums of military and maritime history also opened in the twentieth century: the Imperial War Museum in 1917, and the National Maritime Museum in 1934.

London has several smaller museums of note. The Dulwich Picture Gallery was the first purpose-built public art gallery in England, opening in 1817. Its architect, Sir John Soane, turned his own house in Lincoln's Inn Fields into a museum and architectural showcase, known as the Soane Museum. The Wallace Collection is a notable small collection of Old Master paintings and furniture, with an emphasis on French works. The Courtauld Institute of Art, which pioneered the study of art history in Britain from its foundation in 1932, is now located in Somerset House, the former premises of the Royal Academy. The Museum of London, charting the capital's history, has been located in the Barbican complex since 1976; a sister museum, the London Museum Docklands, opened in 2003.

== Libraries ==
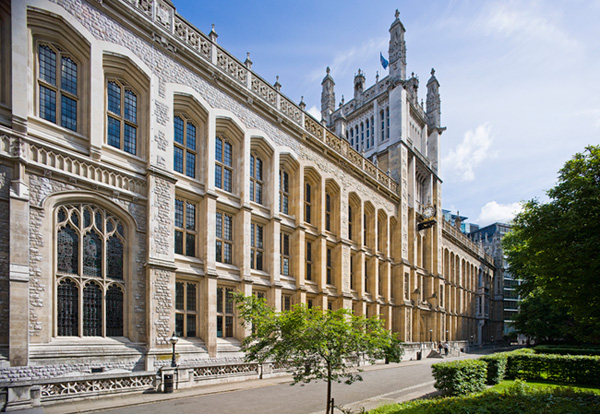
Maughan Library, King's College London

The British Library, located on Euston Road in St Pancras is the largest library in the world. It is the national library of the United Kingdom and is a legal deposit library. There are many local public libraries across London, with each borough having its own library system, joined through the London Libraries network. Some notable local libraries include Kensington Central Library and the Barbican Library. There are also private subscription libraries, including the London Library.

There are many research libraries in London, including the Wellcome Library and Dana Centre. There are also many university libraries, including the British Library of Political and Economic Science at the London School of Economics (LSE), the Abdus Salam Library at Imperial College, the Maughan Library at King's College, and the Senate House Libraries at the University of London. Many learned institutions host a library such as the Inner Temple Library, and the Houses of Parliament contains the House of Commons Library and the House of Lords Library.

== Night-life ==
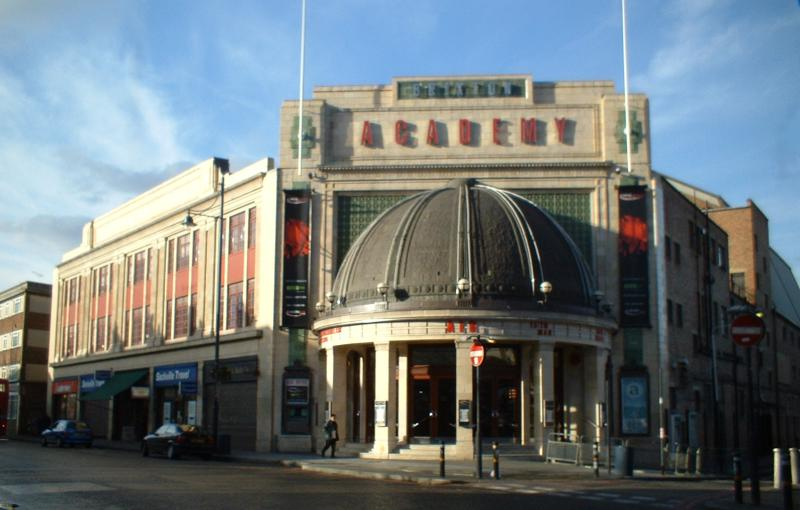
Brixton Academy

Apart from the pubs and clubs, there are many music venues. Among the best known are Shepherd's Bush Empire, Brixton Academy, Hammersmith Apollo, Wembley Arena, the Marquee Club, The UCL Bloomsbury, the Royal Albert Hall and the London Astoria, which has now closed. Between 2007 and 2015, London lost 35% of its grassroots music venues, threatening the city's role as an incubator of new musical talent. London is home to many clubs such as the Ministry of Sound.

London also has a thriving LGBT community with a high number of venues catering to gays and lesbians, such as G-A-Y, The Black Cap, the Coleherne and Heaven. However, London lost 58% of its LGBTQ+ night time venues between 2006 and 2017. Spaces catering to black and minority ethnic (BAME) LGBTQ+ people have been disproportionately vulnerable to closure.

Comedy is widely popular with the capital having around 100 venues showing alternative comedy. London is also home to The Comedy Store one of the longest running comedy venues in the world.

== Sport ==
London is the home of many professional sport teams and has hosted various international sporting events, including the Summer Olympics in 1908, 1948, and 2012. Football is very popular and London is home to Wembley Stadium as well as club stadiums such as the Emirates Stadium, Stamford Bridge, the Olympic Stadium, and Tottenham Hotspur Stadium. Cricket grounds such as Lord's and The Oval are in London and rugby league and rugby union are popular team sports in the city. The Boat Race and the Wimbledon Championships, among the most famous contests in rowing and tennis, respectively, occur in London. The Olympic Stadium also hosts athletics events.

== Cultural influence ==
Because of its history and fame, London has frequently been depicted in various forms of media. As such, cultural tourism is growing as London became the second most visited city in the world in 2017, and many travellers come to the capital to enjoy the British way of living. Culture tourism generates £3.2 billion per year for London's economy and supports around 80,000 jobs. This is why London has recently been promoted as a cultural centre to attract a greater amount of tourists, and compete with cities such as Tokyo, Paris and New York.

== See also ==
- Architecture of London
