= Young Eman =

British rapper and record producer

- Also known as: Eline De Sainté Vherodia
- Born: Emmanuel Manunure c. 2005 (Age 20); Sheffield, England
- Genres: UK Underground; rage; trap; cloud rap; electronica
- Occupations: Rapper; music producer; songwriter
- Years active: 2021-present
- Label: September Recordings
- Website: https://www.binebinebine.com/

Emmanuel Manunure (born c. 2005), known professionally as Young Eman, is a British rapper and music producer from Manor, Sheffield. Dazed has highlighted his role within the UK Underground movement following his single "Popstar in da Bits". In late 2026, he released his debut mixtape Bine under September Recordings, with NME noting elements of electronica, trance and trap.

== Early life ==
Manunure cites Skepta, Labrinth, N-Dubz, Rae Sremmurd and Travis Scott as his earliest musical influences alongside his older brother, whom he would watch record music during his childhood. He started producing at the age of 11. Manunure is of Zimbabwean descent.

== Career ==
=== 2021-2022: Early cyphers and independent releases ===
Manunure first gained recognition at the age of 17, appearing in the Blackbox "Hardest U18s Cypher".

=== 2023-2024: "Eazi" and EA Sports FC 24 ===
In September 2023, Manunure released the single "Eazi", which was featured on the official soundtrack for EA Sports FC 24. Critics compared the track's vocal style to early J Hus.

In August 2024, Manunure performed alongside Skaiwater at Antagonist Festival.

=== 2025-Present: Solo recognition and Bine ===
In January 2025, he released the single "My Yah!", which earned co-signs from Tiffany Calver, Wolfacejoeyy and Young T and Bugsey. In February, he released the EP Steeze Kills, with Mixtape Madness highlighting its grunge-inspired production.

In a March 2025 interview with Clash, Manunure expressed uncertainty about his music career, stating he "might never release music again" and noting an interest in fashion and jewellery.

Later in December 2025, his standalone single "Popstar in da Bits" gained attention on social media, with music outlets noting its portrayal of British youth culture and comparing the track's accompanying music video to Channel U. In June 2026, Manunure followed it with the single "Misfit Life", with The Fader highlighting the track's aggressive 808s and comparing its melodic style to Trippie Redd and Stormzy. Later in October 2026, he released his debut mixtape, Bine.

== Artistry ==
=== Influences and musical style ===
Manunure frequently utilizes vocal manipulation for his delivery, such as altering his pitch to become Eline De Sainté Vherodia for "Popstar in da Bits". The lyrical content on Bine contains themes surrounding nihilism, paranoia and guilt which NME notes sit "beneath his riotous antics", contrasting with the heavy bass and distorted synthesizers of the production.

=== Visual style ===
Manunure's aesthetic choices are inspired by early 2000s "chav" culture, incorporating elements such as digital cameras and cropped puffer jackets. Dazed noted despite initial criticism, it has been recontextualized as a symbol of "digital rebellion". In September 2026, he made his official runway debut for John Richmond at London Fashion Week inspired by Alexander McQueen.
