= Ledbyher =

British rapper and record producer

- Born: Rachel Aisyah Diack; 9 November 2003 (age 23); Ingolstadt, Germany
- Origin: King's Lynn, England
- Genres: Jerk; alternative R&B; drill; grunge; neo soul
- Occupations: Rapper; record producer
- Years active: 2020–present
- Label: Island
- Website: https://www.ledbyher.co.uk/

Rachel Aisyah Diack (born 9 November 2003), known professionally as Ledbyher, is a British rapper, songwriter and record producer. Cited by The Guardian as a member of the UK underground rap scene, she describes her musical style as "bedroom drill". Her work is characterized by a "wispy, sung-spoken" delivery and ethereal, lo-fi instrumentals. Her debut extended play Cunch was released in 2023, before she signed to Island Records and released the mixtape The Elephant in 2026.

== Early life ==
Diack was born in Ingolstadt, Germany, where her father was stationed with the Royal Air Force. At age three, she relocated with her mother to Medan, Indonesia, before later moving to a council house in the countryside of King's Lynn, Norfolk. She has both Indonesian and Scottish ancestry. She began producing music at the age of fourteen, producing R&B instrumentals for her sister Anjeli. She relocated to London at the age of 19 to pursue a professional music career. She also began studying film at the University of London.

== Career ==
Diack released her debut EP, Cunch, in 2023. She then signed to Island Records and released her mixtape The Elephant in February 2026. She released the single "Dirty Rumours", which was produced by Clams Casino and Tony Seltzer, in June 2026. She released the Midwinter EP in November 2026.

== Artistry ==
Diack has described her musical style as "bedroom drill" and "lady trap".

She cites William Wordsworth's autobiographical poem "The Prelude" as inspiration for her stagename.

== Discography ==
=== Mixtapes ===
Title	Details
The Elephant	Released: 13 February 2026; Label: Island Records; Formats: Digital download, vinyl

=== Extended plays ===
Title	Details
Cunch	Released: 18 August 2023; Label: BE83 Music; Formats: Digital download
Midwinter	Released: 20 November 2026; Label: Island; Formats: Digital download

== Awards and nominations ==
- 2025 — Nominated: 'Best New Rap/Hip-Hop' (Notion New Music Awards)
- 2025 — Winner: 'Best Low Budget' for "Leeches" (London Music Video Awards)
