= Phreshboyswag =

British rapper

phreshboyswag
- Also known as: Mack Hello, Mack Davies
- Born: Mackenzie Ian Anderson
- Genre: Jerk
- Occupations: Rapper; producer
- Years active: 2019–present
- Formerly of: 1c34
- Website: phreshboyswag.net

Mackenzie Ian Anderson, known professionally as phreshboyswag (stylised in lowercase), is a British rapper and record producer. He had previously been a member of American rapper Xaviersobased's collective 1c34.

British magazine The Face, labeled Anderson's single "Inspire" as a "jerk anthem". In 2023, he released his debut album Rock Bottom, followed by his second album VIP. In 2026, he released his third album, party boy.

== Career ==
Anderson began his career in London, England. However, he shortly moved to New York City where he joined American rapper Xaviersobased's collective 1c34. According to music journalist Samuel Hyland, Anderson was later scheduled for a sold-out show in Bushwick, Brooklyn, but removed from the bill due to an online controversy.

In 2023, Anderson released his debut album Rock Bottom, which according to Hyland featured "dystopian jerk beats, cooked up by snare-happy nihilists like Clay10 and ss3bby." The album cover artwork featured actress Chloe Cherry smoking marijuana with an Instagram filter. The song "Hottie" was featured on Pitchfork's head of editorial content and co-founder of No Bells blog Mano Sundaresan's list of "favorite songs of 2023".

New York magazine The Fader labeled him as a "key moment" in the rise of the UK underground rap scene, stating that he was more associated with the New York jerk revival than the London music scene.

In 2024, music journalist Kieran Press-Reynolds, writing for British magazine The Face, labeled Anderson's song "Inspire" (2023) as a "jerk anthem". That same year, 1c34 had cut ties with the rapper after abuse allegations circulated online. The Fader stated that Anderson had incorporated elements of the indie sleaze aesthetic. Trill magazine credited Anderson with popularizing the aesthetic in the 2020s underground rap scene. Anderson has been affiliated with the London rap collective Dogworld.

According to Pitchfork, American rapper Nettspend had featured Anderson on a song which made use of a beat later found on Xaviersobased's 2024 mixtape With 2 on the track "what zit tooya".

== Influence ==
British rapper Fakemink cited Phreshboyswag as an influence.

American rapper OsamaSon has feuded with Anderson, eventually referencing him on his song "Waffle House" from his 2025 album Jump Out.

In an article about the Marxist TikTok meme account thomasankarafan, music journalist Kieran Press-Reynolds cites a video of rappers Xaviersobased and Phreshboyswag dancing in "giddy circles" as a commenter asks "Is Phresh Trotsky?"

== Discography ==
=== Albums ===
Title	Album details
Rock Bottom	Released: April 10, 2023; Label: Self-released; Format: Digital download, streaming
VIP	Released: May 10, 2024; Label: Self-released; Format: Digital download, streaming
party boy	Released: June 23, 2026; Label: Self-released; Format: Digital download, streaming

=== EPs ===
Title	EP details
i have really bad attachment issues	Released: March 1, 2023; Label: Self-released; Format: Digital download, streaming
phreshboyxpo with jtxpo	Released: 2023; Label: Self-released; Format: Digital download, streaming
my autumn diary 🍂📚	Released: September 17, 2024; Label: Self-released; Format: Digital download, streaming
