= Burnermunde =

British surrealist filmmaking duo

Arran Ashan and Mustafa 'Musti' Mohamoud, known collectively as Burnermunde, are a London-based filmmaking duo. They are known for their surreal, absurd and satirical comedic themes and distinct editing style, which reflect a social realist view of contemporary London.

== History ==
Ashan and Mohamoud became aware of each other through Instagram, and first collaborated on a music video. They later bonded over shared subcultures, artistic vision, love of cinema, and inspirations such as Chris Morris and Sean Baker. After individually directing a string of music videos for musicians they were acquainted with, including Sainté and Jim Legxacy, Ashan and Mohamoud became frustrated with commercial work and decided to collaborate on creating their own films.

In May 2026, Burnermunde were commissioned to direct an advertisement for the Nike/Palace Skateboards collaboration, featuring English footballer Wayne Rooney. In the same year, they directed the opening credits for Saturday Night Live UK.

== Artistry ==
Burnermunde have adopted a deliberately low-budget approach to filmmaking, frequently using readily available technology and amateur performers. Their 2026 short film HufflePuff was produced for approximately £60, with half of the budget spent on the electronic cigarette featured in the film and the remainder used to cast the actor playing its salesman "Peter Paneer", whom they found through Craigslist.

The name Burnermunde combines "burner", referring to a secondary or anonymous Instagram account, with munde, a Punjabi word meaning "boys".

== Filmography ==
Year	Title	Writers	Directors	Notes
2024	6 TILL 6	Yes	Yes	Documentary
2025	STATE	Yes	Yes	Short Film
2026	HufflePuff		Yes	Short Film
2026	W*NKER		Yes	Short Film
2026	BEG		Yes	Short Film
2026	INJECTION		Yes	Documentary
