= Jerk (music genre) =

Hip-hop microgenre from the early 2020s

- Other names: Nu-jerk; jerk revival
- Stylistic origins: Pluggnb; trap; plugg; lowend; cloud rap; digicore; jerk rap; hyphy
- Cultural origins: c. 2020; New York City, United States
- Typical instruments: Digital audio workstation; drum machine; autotune; synthesizer; sampler
- Derivative forms: Jugg

Subgenres
- Hoodtrap; vampjerk

Regional scenes
- United Kingdom

Other topics
- Internet rap; microgenre; 2k13 Hood EDM; underground rap; sigilkore

Jerk is a subgenre of hip-hop that emerged in New York City during the early 2020s. It draws inspiration from the original 2000s wave of jerk rap and street dance culture.

Notable artists associated with the scene include Xaviersobased, Phreshboyswag, Nettspend, Fakemink, Islurwhenitalk, FearDorian, YT, EsDeeKid, Yhapojj and Jim Legxacy. The genre achieved success in the United Kingdom, where it helped give rise to the UK underground rap scene.

== Characteristics ==
Writing for British magazine The Face, music journalist Kieran Press-Reynolds described jerk as "fidgety rhythms, staggered snares and mangled vocals", and noted that a variety of jerk rappers "boast" but also showcase "a quirky and sensitive lyrical undercurrent [that] tends to lurk beneath the tough-guy facade".

According to New York magazine The Fader, although Xaviersobased and his collective 1c34 are credited with spearheading the jerk genre, he never listened to the original wave of jerk rap and is more inspired by Milwaukee hip-hop's lowend scene in his "percussion choices".

== History ==
=== Origins ===
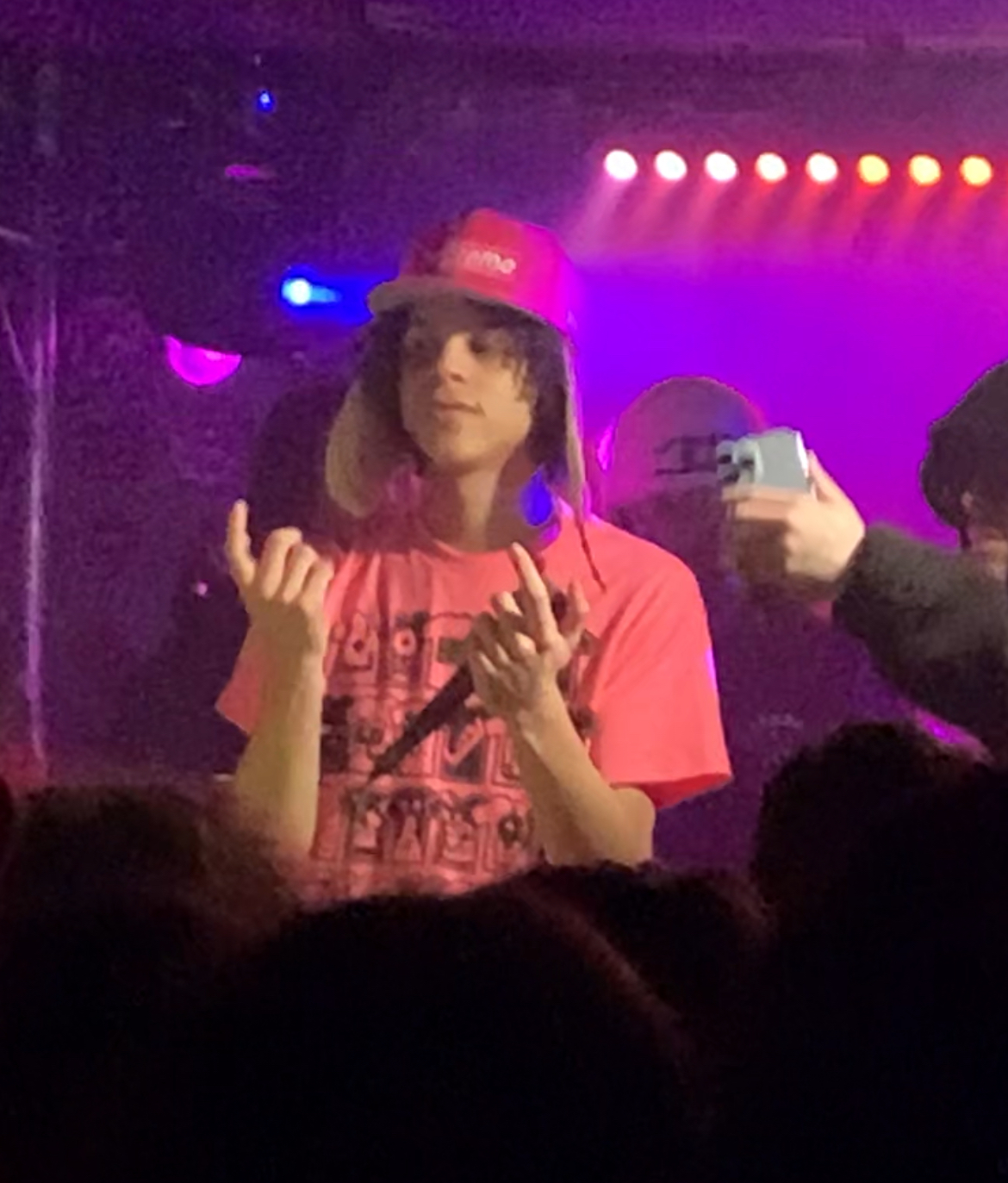
Xaviersobased performing at Baby's All Right in Brooklyn, NY on February 2, 2023

In 2021, New York rapper Xaviersobased formed the collective 1c34, who reimagined the sound of jerk rap into a completely different style, adapting its framework to fit the evolving aesthetics of underground rap. They are credited with spearheading and popularizing the movement which was then further developed by Californian producer kashpaint. This new style of jerk rap blended elements of cloud rap, digicore, lowend and plugg.

Writing for The Face, music critic Kieran Press-Reynolds labelled tracks such as Xaviersobased's "Patchmade" (2022), Phreshboyswag's "Inspire" (2023), and Nettspend's "Shine N Peace" (2023) as "jerk anthems". Artists such as Yhapojj, ksuuvi, Bloody!, idkcap, percosits, Tenkay, Nettspend and FearDorian further contributed to the movement. "Underground heroes" like Duwap Kaine later drew influence from the style, releasing the album DuwapSoBased in 2023. Artists Islurwhenitalk and Subiibabii were credited with pioneering the "vampjerk" style, which drew from the subgenre of hip-hop music sigilkore.

=== Regional scenes ===
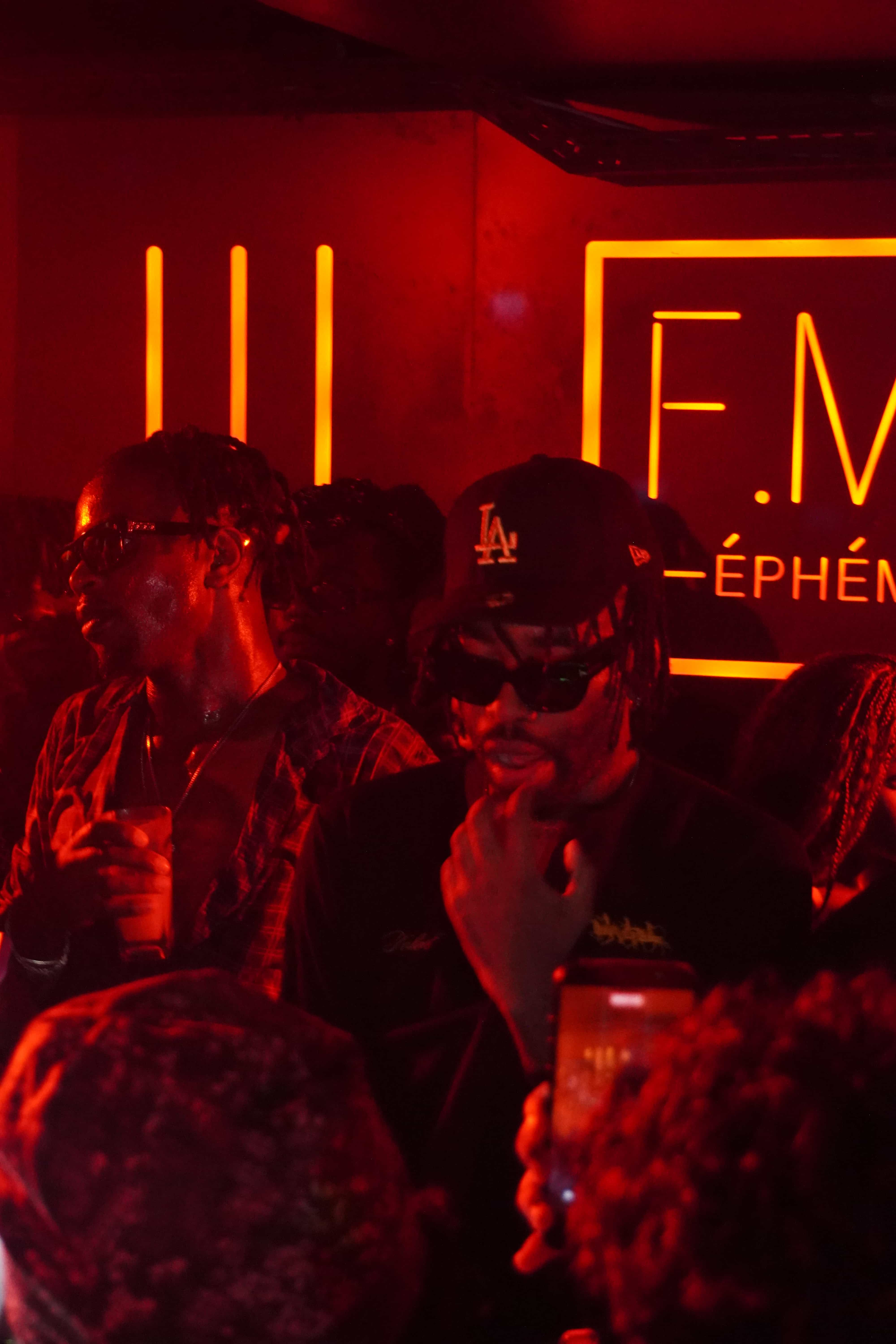
British rappers YT and Len Lucci at a listening party, 2026

While rooted in the US, the jerk scene gained further momentum in the UK underground rap scene, with the movement being regarded as a "new UK rap revolution". The British jerk scene saw wider popularity in 2024, being spearheaded by artists like Fakemink as well as YT with his singles "Black and Tan" and "Prada or Celine". These releases were followed by further contributions in the genre by artists such as Jim Legxacy, EsDeeKid, Len Lucci, and Fimiguerrero.

== Influence ==
Writing for Dazed magazine, music journalist Solomon Pace-McCarick noted rapper Cortisa Star as drawing influences from jerk in her production choices.

== Related genres ==
=== Jugg rap ===
Jugg rap (also known as Jugg) is a microgenre that draws from the "twitchy snare rhythms" of jerk. While writing for Pitchfork, Press-Reynolds stated that the style's "breakout smash" was the song "everyday is the same" by rapper ocelot, who drew inspiration from rapper Islurwhenitalk "a sigilkore deity who pioneered this sort of ultra-twitchy, rhythmic meltdown that's as much dance music as rap". Artists such as ss3bby, xannaholik, fauxf6r, 5lim and Heymylan, on top of the collective 25r3set, have also been noted as influential in the development of the genre. The style is characterized by "sequences of sound effects and sidechained bass that swallows everything". The term "FXspam" has also been used on SoundCloud to describe the scene for its use of "degraded samples".

== See also ==
- Internet rap
- Hyperpop
