= Len Lucci =

British rapper (born 1999)

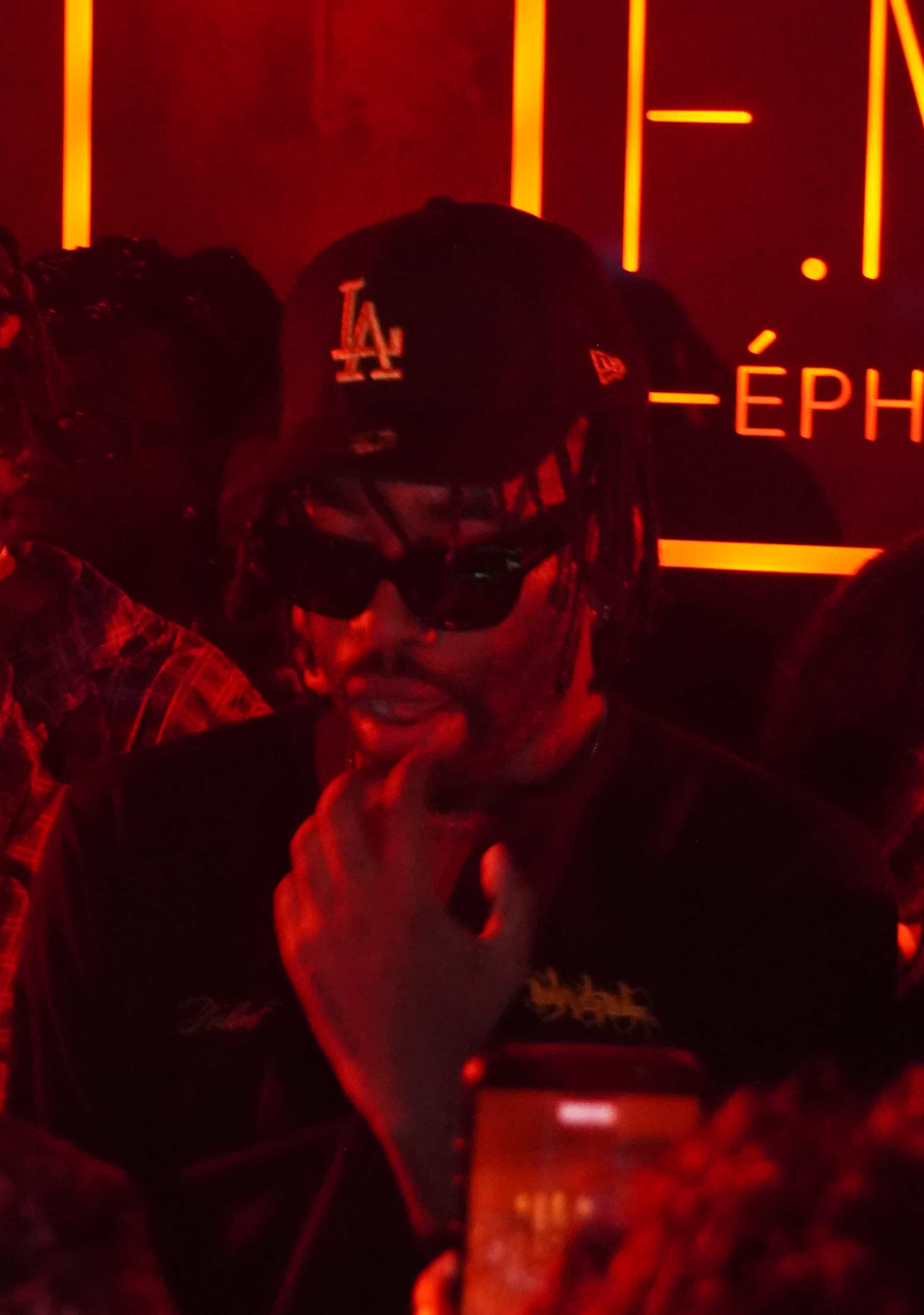
- Len Lucci in 2026

Background information
- Also known as: Len; rubiangozai; Julio Lennon
- Born: Tenison Lawani; November 25, 1999 (age 26); Stockwell, Lambeth, London
- Genres: UK hip hop; Afrobeats; UK underground rap
- Years active: 2018–present
- Labels: Lizzy; BE83

Tenison Lawani (born 25 November 1999), known professionally as Len Lucci or simply Len, is a British rapper from Stockwell, London Borough of Lambeth. A member of the UK underground rap scene, he is known for his eclectic and experimental sound inspired by Afrobeats.

His notable releases include his debut studio album, Cobalt: SoMuchMore (2024), and the collaborative mixtape Conglomerate (2024) with Fimiguerrero and Lancey Foux.

== Early life ==
Lucci was born on 25 November 1999, in Stockwell, London Borough of Lambeth. He is of Nigerian descent. His mother introduced him to R&B artists such as Luther Vandross, Chaka Khan, Michael Jackson, and Usher, while he got into gangsta rap such as 50 Cent, Max B, Lil Wayne from his father. Len stated that 808s & Heartbreak by Kanye West was the album that "opened [his] eyes." He began rapping in 2016 while still in school and began recording seriously and uploading music to SoundCloud in 2017, when he was in college learning music technology. Len retaught himself production after finishing his education because he realized that much of what was taught was linear and formulaic.

== Career ==
Lucci began to take creating music more seriously during the COVID-19 pandemic. He first gained success in 2022 with his songs "Where's My Bradda!?" and "Sleep". He released his second mixtape, Dead End, on 28 April 2022. His next project, Methmuzik, Vol. 2, was released on 25 November and made use of a dark, grimy atmosphere. Lucci followed it up with Lehgoland on 27 July 2023, which had a more upbeat, summer sound.

Lucci released his debut studio album, Cobalt: SoMuchMore, on 26 April 2024. On 8 November, he released a collaborative mixtape, Conglomerate, with Fimiguerrero and Lancey Foux. He released his sophomore album, Goldenboy, on 14 August 2026 after several delays.

== Influences and artistry ==
Lucci has been described as incorporating a diverse sound palette into his music, including alté, afroswing, afrobeats, lo-fi, and trap. His earlier work such as his 2019 mixtape Miles Away From Miles was more trap-inspired, with Playboi Carti-esque beats with less, although some experimentation. Lucci's 2022 single "Solace" took influence from rave culture, jungle music, and drum and bass. He names Max B, Future, Kanye West, 50 Cent, Young Thug, Drake, Skepta, Dimzy from 67, Swift from Smoke Boys, and Lancey Foux as his biggest influences.

== Discography ==
=== Studio albums ===
Title	Details
Cobalt: SoMuchMore	Released: 26 April 2024; Label: Lizzy Records; Formats: CD, Digital download
Goldenboy	Released: 14 August 2026; Label: Lizzy Records; Formats: Digital download

=== Mixtapes ===
Title	Details
Miles Away From Mars	Released: 19 July 2019; Label: Self-released; Formats: Digital download
Dead End	Released: 28 April 2022; Label: Self-released; Formats: Digital download
Methmuzik, Vol. 2	Released: 25 November 2022; Label: Self-released; Formats: Digital download
Lehgoland	Released: 27 July 2023; Label: BE83 Music; Formats: Digital download
Conglomerate (with Fimiguerrero and Lancey Foux)	Released: 8 November 2024; Label: Lizzy Records; Formats: Cassette, CD, Digital download

=== Extended plays ===
Title	Details
Before I Leave	Released: 5 November 2018; Label: Self-released; Formats: Digital download
