= Fimiguerrero =

British-Nigerian rapper (born 2001)

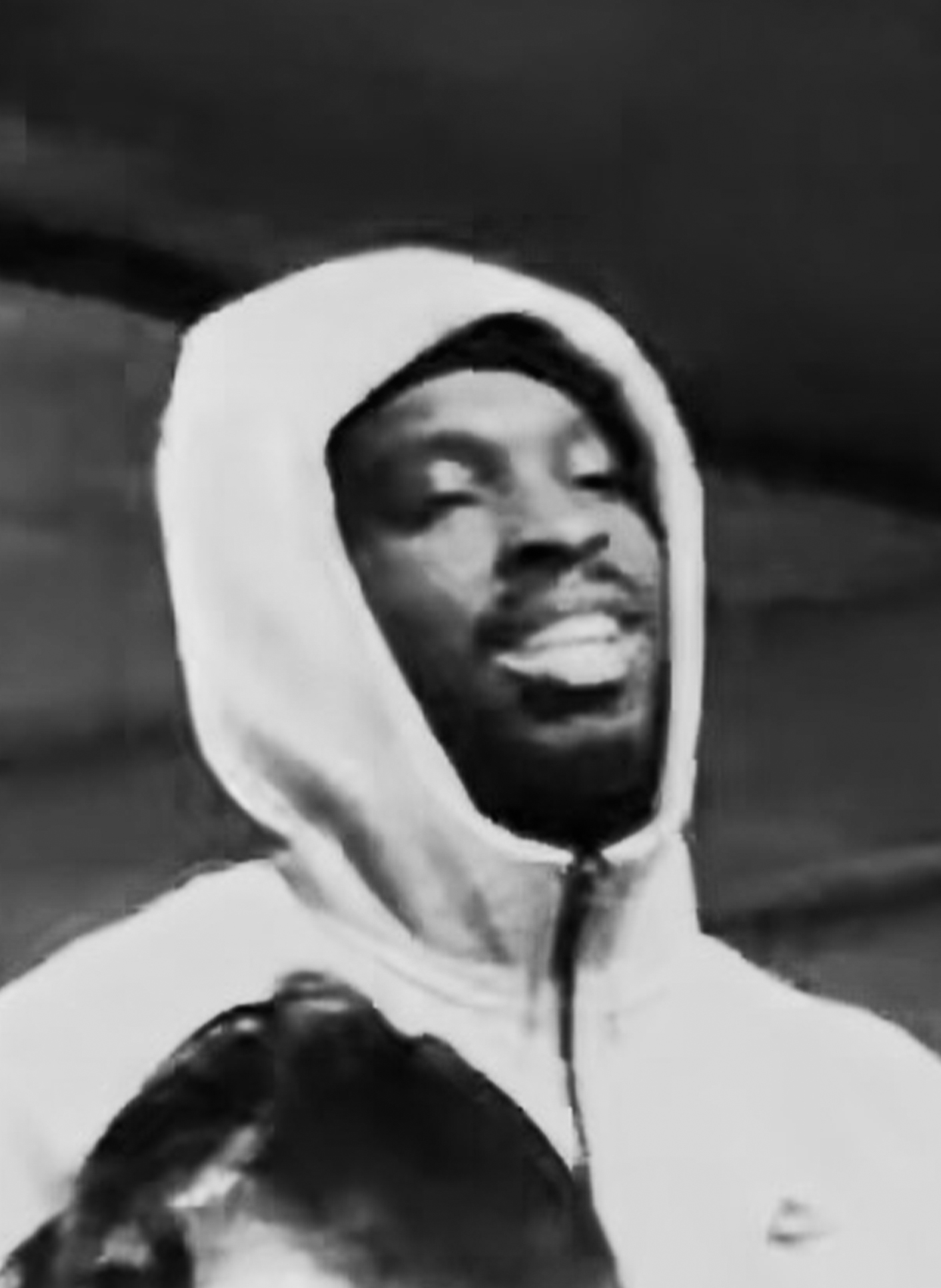
- Akinola in 2026

Background information
- Born: Fimihan Uthman Akinola; February 24, 2001 (age 25); Nigeria
- Genres: UK underground; UK hip hop; rage; jerk
- Years active: 2019–present
- Labels: XV; Lizzy

Fimihan Uthman Akinola (born 24 February 2001), better known as Fimiguerrero, is a British-Nigerian rapper. A member of the UK underground rap scene, he has released multiple mixtapes, including Conglomerate, a collaboration with Lancey Foux and Len. Akinola's music has been described as a blend of rage and "eclectic hyper-jerk".

== Early life ==
Fimihan Uthman Akinola was born on 24 February 2001, in Nigeria. He moved to Greenwich in London with his mother and brother when he was three months old. They later moved around to Thamesmead, Newham, and briefly, Kent. He first started recording music after stealing a microphone on his fifteenth birthday and using headphones from his school computer lab. Akinola studied fashion marketing in university and had to repeat his first year twice. He eventually dropped out to pursue music.

== Career ==
After dropping out of university, Fimiguerrero traveled to record in cities such as Manchester and Copenhagen, releasing multiple projects. He released two projects in 2023, the extended play Black and the mixtape Immigrant. The former contained a feature from rapper Lancey Foux.

On 16 August 2024, Fimiguerrero released his fifth mixtape, New World Order. On 8 November, he released a collaborative mixtape, Conglomerate, with Lancey Foux and Len to critical acclaim.

On 7 June 2026, Fimiguerrero released the EP The Statue Of A Fool, which featured Bassvictim and Fakemink. His next mixtape is planned to be titled Lost City.

== Influences and artistry ==
Akinola grew up listening to grime and UK drill along with his mother's collection of fuji music, Whitney Houston, and Celine Dion. When describing Akinola's 2023 projects Black and Immigrant, Ethan Herlock of the magazine Wonderland noted that consisted of rage with touches of Atlanta trap, plugg, club rap, Afroswing, and cloud rap. Akinola has also released music influenced by the jerk subgenre, including his 2024 collaborative mixtape, Conglomerate, which was described by Kieran Press-Reynolds of Pitchfork as "eclectic hyper-jerk".

== Discography ==
=== Mixtapes ===
Title	Details
Human Anatomy	Released: 21 August 2019; Label: XV; Formats: Digital download
Fimiguerrero	Released: 2 August 2021; Label: XV; Formats: Digital download
No Way Out	Released: 31 December 2021; Label: XV; Formats: Digital download
Immigrant	Released: 6 July 2023; Label: XV; Formats: Digital download
New World Order	Released: 16 August 2024; Label: XV, Lizzy; Formats: Digital download
Conglomerate (with Len and Lancey Foux)	Released: 8 November 2024; Label: Lizzy; Formats: Cassette, CD, Digital download

=== Extended plays ===
Title	Details
kʌnt	Released: 29 March 2022; Label: XV; Formats: Digital download
Black	Released: 24 February 2023; Label: XV; Formats: Digital download
The Statue of a Fool	Released: 17 June 2026; Label: Lizzy Records; Formats: Digital download
