= Lancey Foux =

British rapper (born 1995)

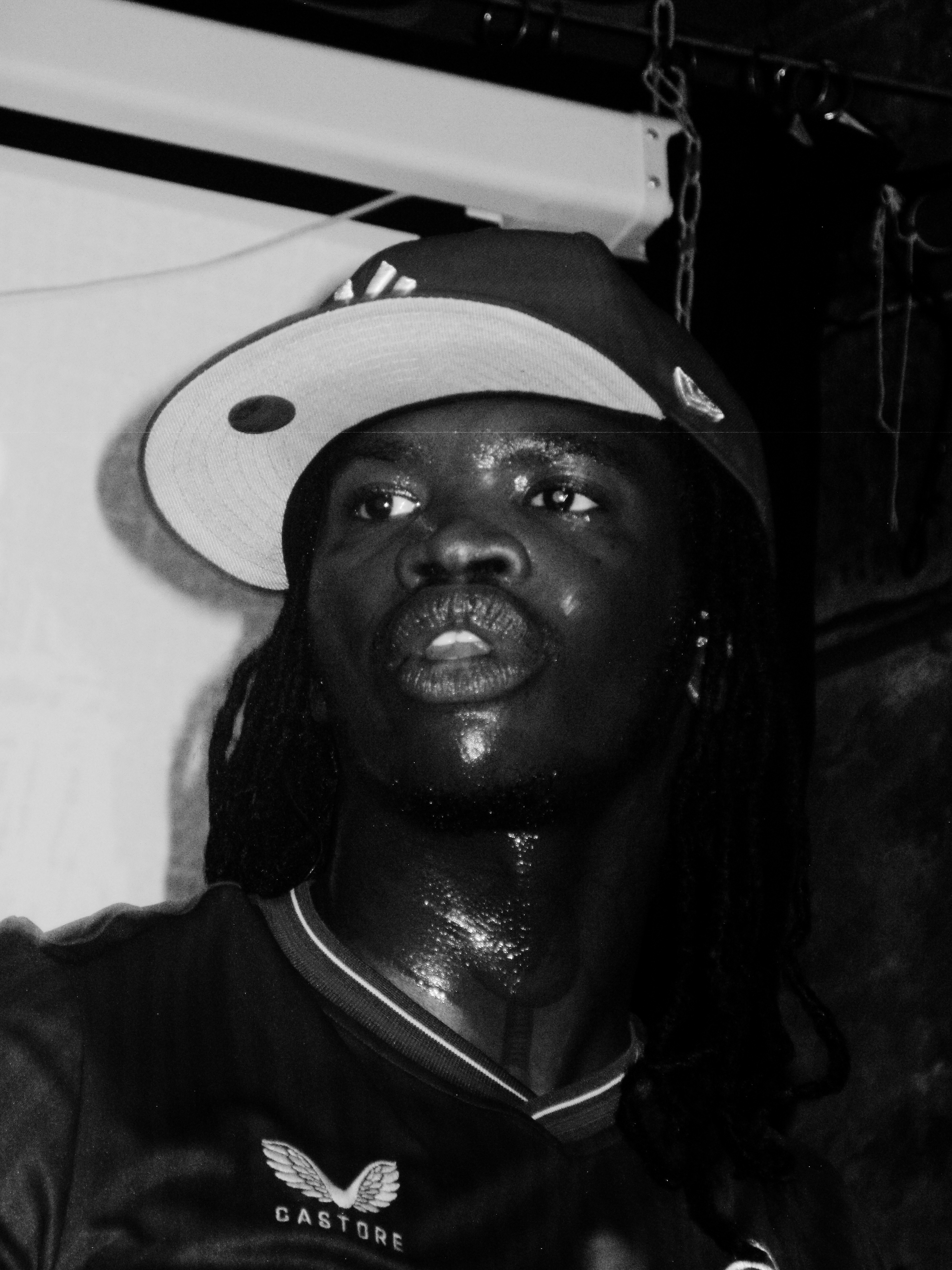
- Lancey Foux in 2023

Background information
- Born: Lance O. Omal; 30 November 1995 (age 30); Stratford, London, England
- Genres: Trap; cloud rap; rage; alternative R&B; pop rap
- Occupations: Rapper; singer; songwriter; record producer; model; designer
- Years active: 2015–present
- Labels: RCA; PSYKETEAM
- Partner: Leomie Anderson (2016–2023)

Lance O. Omal (born 30 November 1995), known professionally as Lancey Foux, is a British rapper and singer from Stratford, London. The Guardian credited Omal with being "fundamental" to the development of the UK underground rap scene.

== Personal life ==
Lance O. Omal was born in East London to parents of Ugandan descent. He dated British model Leomie Anderson from 2016 to 2023.

== Career ==
=== 2015–2017: Online beginnings and solo debut ===
Foux began his music career in 2015 by freestyling over YouTube beats from his bedroom. In the same year, he released his debut studio album Pink. Two weeks later, he released a single titled "About It". Later that year, he released his sophomore studio album TEEN SKUM. After two years of releasing singles on SoundCloud, he released a collaborative studio album with English producer Nyge titled First Day at Nursery.

=== 2018–2020: Too Far Alive and Pink II & Friend or Foux ===
By early 2018, Foux started using a different style which he utilized on his album Too Far Alive. Three months later, he released Pink II, the sequel to his debut album, which contained a feature from British rapper Skepta on "Dyed 2WICE". He soon joined Skepta's SK LEVEL Europe tour.

Foux performed at US hip-hop festival Rolling Loud in 2019 and modelled for Jordan and A-COLD-WALL*, MISBHV, Trapstar, and Naomi Campbell's 2019 Fashion for Relief Gala. He also appeared on the track "Animal Instinct", which appeared on Skepta's fifth studio album Ignorance Is Bliss. He released his fifth studio album, Friend or Foux, on 6 December 2019.

In 2020, months after releasing his project Friend or Foux, Foux cancelled his tour prematurely due to the COVID-19 pandemic. Later in June, he went onto release a pair of singles addressing the Black Lives Matter movement, "TIME FOR WAR !I" and "RELAX !I", the former which was on the first version of his 2022 project, LIFE IN HELL.

In December 2020, Lancey Foux released a single, "Poison", featuring close friend Bakar.

=== 2021–2026: First Degree, LIVE.EVIL, Life in Hell, BACK2DATRAP, FIRST DEGREE: 2ND CHARGE & THE TIME OF OUR LIVES ===
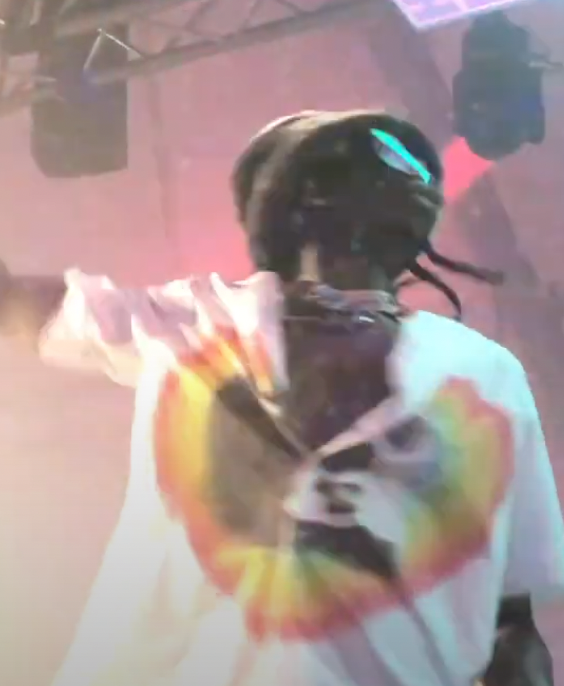
Lancey Foux performing in April 2022

In January 2021, Lancey Foux released the second promotional single for his upcoming album, titled "Steelo Flow". One month later, Lancey Foux released another single titled "DONT TALK", which was the lead single for his mixtape FIRST DEGREE.

In November 2021, Foux released a mixtape titled LIVE.EVIL. The project received two features from American rappers Lil Yachty on the third track "OUTTAMYMIND!" and 24kGoldn on the last track "BIG SWAG".

In January 2022, Foux modelled for Matthew M Williams's brand 1017 ALYX 9SM in Milan, Italy. He released his sixth studio album, LIFE IN HELL, on 28 October 2022. It featured the hit single, "LANCEY OR LANCEY", which sparked a viral TikTok trend in summer 2023.

On 8 September 2023 Foux released his third mixtape BACK2DATRAP, a collaborative effort with British producer Bally and a sole feature from Sexyy Red on the lead single "MMM HMM".

In 2024, Foux collaborated with New Zealand producer 9lives on the song ABU DHABI.

On 8 November 2024, he released a collaborative mixtape with British rappers Fimiguerrero and Len titled CONGLOMERATE. The mixtape was released via Sincere’s Lizzy Records and peaked at #23 on the UK Albums Chart, a first for all three acts. Lancey has later stated feeling of being more of an “executive producer” of Conglomerate rather than just a joint artist in his interview with Niall Smith for NME, saying he “only has vocals on five tracks”.

On 26 February 2026, he released the album FIRST DEGREE: 2ND CHARGE.

On 28 August 2026, he released the album THE TIME OF OUR LIVES.

== Discography ==
Studio albums

Title	Album details
Pink	Released: 9 September 2015; Format: Digital download, streaming
Teen Skum	Released: 29 November 2015; Format: Streaming
First Day at Nursery (with Nyge)	Released: 14 July 2017; Format: Digital download, streaming
Too Far Alive	Released: 12 March 2018; Format: Streaming
Pink II	Released: 6 July 2018; Format: Digital download, streaming
Friend or Foux	Released: 6 December 2019; Label: Universal Music; Format: Digital download, streaming
Life in Hell	Released: 28 October 2022; Format: Digital download, streaming
The Time of Our Lives	Released: 28 August 2026; Format: Digital download, streaming
