= List of 2026 albums (January–June) =

The following is a list of albums, EPs, and mixtapes released in the first half of 2026. These albums are (1) original, i.e. excluding reissues, remasters, and compilations of previously released recordings, and (2) notable, defined as having received significant coverage from reliable sources independent of the subject.

For additional information about bands formed, reformed, disbanded, or on hiatus, for deaths of musicians, and for links to musical awards, see 2026 in music.

For information on albums released in the second half of 2026, see List of 2026 albums (July–December).

== First quarter ==
=== January ===
List of albums released in January 2026
Go to: February | March | April | May | June | Back to top
Release date	Artist	Album	Genre	Label	Ref.
January 1	Joost Klein	Kleinkunst	Gabberpop, happy hardcore, Eurotrance		
January 1	Rawayana	¿Dónde es el after?		Brocoli Records, Rimas	
January 2	Paleface Swiss	The Wilted EP	Beatdown hardcore, nu metalcore, deathcore	Blood Blast Distribution	
January 5	Petra	Hope	Christian metal	Girder Music	
January 5	Cxmmxns (Ben Fielding and Reuben Morgan)	The Commons Chapel: Where Two or Three Are Gathered	Worship		
January 5	Vince Gill	Brown's Diner Bar		MCA	
January 7	Chuu	XO, My Cyberlove		ATRP	
January 7	Euphoria Again and Dogwood Tales	Destination Heaven		Born Loser Records	
January 7	Sondre Lerche	Turning Up the Heat Again		PLZ	
January 9	Alter Bridge	Alter Bridge		Napalm	
January 9	Beyond the Black	Break the Silence	Power metal, symphonic metal	Nuclear Blast	
January 9	Blue	Reflections		Blue Blood International, Cooking Vinyl	
January 9	The Cribs	Selling a Vibe	Indie rock	PIAS	
January 9	Dry Cleaning	Secret Love	Post-punk, spoken word	4AD	
January 9	French Montana and Max B	Coke Wave 3.5: Narcos		Coke Boys Records	
January 9	Jenny on Holiday	Quicksand Heart	Alternative pop, synth-pop	Transgressive	
January 9	The Kid Laroi	Before I Forget	R&B	Columbia	
January 9	Mon Rovîa	Bloodline			
January 9	The Protomen	Act III: This City Made Us	Rock opera, progressive rock	Sound Machine Records	
January 9	Pullman	III		Western Vinyl	
January 9	Sault	Chapter 1			
January 9	Zach Bryan	With Heaven on Top		Belting Bronco, Warner	
January 9	Zu	Ferrum Sidereum		House of Mythology	
January 12	Alpha Drive One	Euphoria		WakeOne	
January 13	Luísa Sonza, Roberto Menescal, and Toquinho	Bossa Sempre Nova	Bossa nova	Sony Music Brazil	
January 14	Evilgiane	Giane 2			
January 15	@onefive	Doh Yoh		Avex Trax	
January 15	Robbie Williams	Britpop		Columbia	
January 15	Skrillex	Kora			
January 15	They Might Be Giants	Eyeball		Idlewild Recordings	
January 15	Tyler Ramsey and Carl Broemel	Celestun			
January 16	Alice Merton	Visions	Pop	Paper Plane	
January 16	ASAP Rocky	Don't Be Dumb	Experimental hip-hop	AWGE, ASAP Worldwide, RCA	
January 16	Cavetown	Running with Scissors	Hyperpop, bedroom pop, dream pop	Futures Music Group	
January 16	Courtney Marie Andrews	Valentine		Loose Future Records	
January 16	DZ Deathrays	Easing Out of Control		DZ Worldwide	
January 16	Edenbridge	Set the Dark on Fire		Steamhammer/SPV	
January 16	Enhypen	The Sin: Vanish		Belift Lab	
January 16	I Promised the World	I Promised the World		Rise	
January 16	The James Hunter Six	Off the Fence		Easy Eye Sound	
January 16	Jana Horn	Jana Horn		No Quarter Records	
January 16	Jon Hopkins and Biggi Hilmars	Wilding (Original Soundtrack)		Domino Soundtracks	
January 16	Julianna Barwick and Mary Lattimore	Tragic Magic	Ambient	inFiné	
January 16	Kid Kapichi	Fearless Nature		Spinefarm	
January 16	Kreator	Krushers of the World		Nuclear Blast	
January 16	Langhorne Slim	The Dreamin' Kind		Dualtone	
January 16	Lexa Gates	I Am			
January 16	Madison Beer	Locket	Pop, R&B	Epic	
January 16	Michael League, Pedrito Martinez & Antonio Sánchez	Elipsis		GroundUP	
January 16	My Ruin	Declaration of Resistance		Magick Room	
January 16	Nat & Alex Wolff	Nat & Alex Wolff		Coup D'Etat Recordings, Broke	
January 16	Ov Sulfur	Endless		Century Media	
January 16	Peaer	Doppelgänger		Danger Collective Records	
January 16	Peter Peter	Heated Rivalry (Original Series Soundtrack)		Milan	
January 16	Richard Marx	After Hours	Jazz, easy listening	Richard Marx Inc.	
January 16	Sassy 009	Dreamer+		Heaven-Sent, PIAS	
January 16	Sleaford Mods	The Demise of Planet X		Rough Trade	
January 16	Smiley and Baka Not Nice	Heartless			
January 16	Soen	Reliance	Alternative metal, progressive metal, progressive rock	Silver Lining Music	
January 16	Together Pangea	Eat Myself		Nettwerk	
January 16	Westside Cowboy	So Much Country 'Till We Get There		Adventure Recordings	
January 16	Wiz Khalifa	Khaotic			
January 16	Xiu Xiu	Xiu Mutha Fuckin' Xiu: Vol. 1		Polyvinyl	
January 16	YoungBoy Never Broke Again	Slime Cry	Hip-hop, trap	Never Broke Again, Motown	
January 19	Exo	Reverxe	K-pop	SM	
January 21	Artio	Soul Rot		LAB	
January 21	Earth and Black Noise	Geometry of Murder: Extra Capsular Extraction Inversions		Fire	
January 23	42 Dugg	Part 3		4PF, CMG, Interscope	
January 23	54-40	Porto			
January 23	Agnes	Beautiful Madness			
January 23	Ari Lennox	Vacancy	R&B, soul	Interscope	
January 23	Callum Beattie	Indi			
January 23	Craven Faults	Sidings		The Leaf Label	
January 23	Crystal Lake	The Weight of Sound	Metalcore, deathcore	Century Media	
January 23	Currensy	Everywhere You Look		Jet Life Recordings	
January 23	The Damned	Not Like Everybody Else	Rock	earMusic	
January 23	The Format	Boycott Heaven		The Vanity Label	
January 23	Gesaffelstein	Enter the Gamma		Columbia	
January 23	Goldfinger	Nine Lives	Pop-punk, ska punk	Big Noise	
January 23	The Hara	The Fallout		Mascot	
January 23	IDK	E.T.D.S.		Broke, Rhymesayers	
January 23	Jamie MacDonald	Jamie MacDonald		Capitol CMG	
January 23	Jamie O'Neal	Gypsum		Audium, BFD Records	
January 23	Julian Lage	Scenes from Above	Jazz	Blue Note	
January 23	Lil Gotit and Lil Keed	Fraternal: Gotit Edition			
January 23	Louis Tomlinson	How Did I Get Here?		BMG	
January 23	Lucinda Williams	World's Gone Wrong		Highway 20 Records	
January 23	Megadeth	Megadeth		BlkIIBlk, Frontiers	
January 23	Mika	Hyperlove	Pop, electropop, synth-pop	Republic	
January 23	The Paper Kites	If You Go There, I Hope You Find It		Wonderlick, Sony Music	
January 23	Pelican	Ascending		Run for Cover	
January 23	Poppy	Empty Hands	Metalcore, alternative metal, industrial metal	Sumerian	
January 23	PVA	No More Like This		It's All for Fun Records	
January 23	Roc Marciano	656			
January 23	Searows	Death in the Business of Whaling		Last Recordings on Earth	
January 23	Sky Valley Mistress	Luna Mausoleum	Blues rock, desert rock	New Heavy Sounds	
January 23	Textures	Genotype	Progressive metalcore, djent	Kscope	
January 23	Van Morrison	Somebody Tried to Sell Me a Bridge	Blues	Orangefield Records	
January 23	Wizkid and Asake	Real, Vol. 1	Afrobeats, afro fusion	Starboy, Giran Republic	
January 26	KiiiKiii	Delulu Pack		Starship	
January 28	Hanabie.	Hot Topic			
January 28	J. Cole	Birthday Blizzard '26			
January 29	Fakemink	The Boy Who Cried Terrified		EtnaVeraVela	
January 29	My Morning Jacket	Peacelands			
January 30	A. G. Cook	The Moment (The Score)	Electronic, techno, ambient	A24 Music	
January 30	Ailbhe Reddy	Kiss Big			
January 30	Buzzcocks	Attitude Adjustment	Power pop, punk rock	Cherry Red	
January 30	By Storm	My Ghosts Go Ghost	Experimental hip-hop	DeadAir, By(e) Storm	
January 30	Cast	Yeah Yeah Yeah		Scruff of the Neck Records	
January 30	DaBaby	Be More Grateful		South Coast Music Group, Interscope	
January 30	Demob Happy	The Grown Ups Are Talking		Milk Parlour Records	
January 30	Don Toliver	Octane	Alternative hip-hop, trap	Donnway & Co, Cactus Jack, Atlantic	
January 30	Francis Rossi	The Accidental		earMusic	
January 30	Geologist	Can I Get a Pack of Camel Lights?		Drag City	
January 30	James Walsh	It's All Happening			
January 30	Joel Ross	Gospel Music	Jazz	Blue Note	
January 30	Jordan Ward	Backward		ARTium, Interscope	
January 30	Joseph	Closer to Happy			
January 30	Joyce Manor	I Used to Go to This Bar		Epitaph	
January 30	Kula Shaker	Wormslayer			
January 30	Labrinth	Cosmic Opera: Act I		Columbia	
January 30	Lande Hekt	Lucky Now		Tapete	
January 30	The Molotovs	Wasted on Youth	Rock, punk	Marshall	
January 30	Nafe Smallz	It's Not You, It's Me			
January 30	Onewe	Studio We: Recording #4		RBW	
January 30	Radium Dolls	Wound Up			
January 30	Robin Trower	One Moment in Time: Live in the USA		Artone, Provogue	
January 30	Sébastien Tellier	Kiss the Beast		Because	
January 30	Shackleton	Euphoria Bound		AD 93	
January 30	Softcult	When a Flower Doesn't Grow		Easy Life Records	
January 30	Terrace Martin	Passion			
January 30	The Soft Pink Truth	Can Such Delightful Times Go on Forever?		Thrill Jockey	
January 30	Therion	Con Orquesta		Napalm	
January 30	We the Kingdom	Dear Jesus	Folk rock	Capitol CMG, Sparrow	
January 30	Whitelands	Sunlight Echoes		Sonic Cathedral	
January 30	Xaviersobased	Xavier	New York hip-hop, jerk, cloud rap	1-Chance, Surf Gang, Atlantic	
January 30	Ye Vagabonds	All Tied Together		River Lea	
January 30	Yumi Zouma	No Love Lost to Kindness		Nettwerk	

=== February ===
List of albums released in February 2026
Go to: January | March | April | May | June | Back to top
Release date	Artist	Album	Genre	Label	Ref.
February 2	Cory Wong	Lost in the Wonder			
February 4	Asher White	Jessica Pratt			
February 4	C.Y.M. and Abby Sage	My Whole World		Roma Recordings	
February 4	Freya Skye	Stardust		Hollywood	
February 4	Joshua Chuquimia Crampton	Anata	Experimental		
February 4	MiSaMo	Play		JYP, Warner Japan	
February 5	Clawfinger	Before We All Die		Reigning Phoenix	
February 5	Eugene Mirman	Here Comes the Whimsy		Pretty Good Friends Records	
February 6	Ateez	Golden Hour: Part.4	K-pop	KQ, RCA, Legacy	
February 6	Beverly Glenn-Copeland	Laughter in Summer	Experimental	Transgressive	
February 6	Big Big Train	Woodcut		Inside Out	
February 6	Charlotte Day Wilson	Patchwork		Stone Woman Records, XL	
February 6	Chuquimamani-Condori	Luzmila Edits			
February 6	Daphni	Butterfly		Jiaolong	
February 6	Dream Nails	You Wish		Marshall Records	
February 6	Dirt Buyer	Dirt Buyer III		Bayonet Records	
February 6	Ella Mai	Do You Still Love Me?	R&B	10Summers Records, Interscope	
February 6	Ellur	At Home in My Mind		Dance to the Radio	
February 6	Illenium	Odyssey		Republic	
February 6	Jay Buchanan	Weapons of Beauty		Sacred Tongue Records	
February 6	J. Cole	The Fall-Off	Hip-hop	Dreamville, Interscope	
February 6	John Craigie	I Swam Here		Zabriskie Point Records	
February 6	Joji	Piss in the Wind	Alternative R&B, trip hop	Palace Creek, VMG	
February 6	Juice Crew	Bobby Digital Presents: Juice Crew All Stars			
February 6	Karnivool	In Verses		Cymatic Records	
February 6	Keli Holiday	Capital Fiction		Keli Holiday	
February 6	KMFDM	Enemy	Electro-industrial, industrial rock, industrial metal	Metropolis	
February 6	Mandy, Indiana	Urgh		Sacred Bones	
February 6	Mayhem	Liturgy of Death	Black metal	Century Media	
February 6	Nick Jonas	Sunday Best		Republic	
February 6	Puscifer	Normal Isn't		Puscifer Entertainment, Alchemy Recordings	
February 6	Rafael Anton Irisarri	Points of Inaccessibility		Black Knoll Editions	
February 6	Ratboys	Singin' to an Empty Chair		New West	
February 6	Ron Carter and Ricky Dillard	Sweet, Sweet Spirit			
February 6	Silversun Pickups	Tenterhooks	Alternative rock, dream pop, indie rock	New Machine Recordings	
February 6	Tigran Hamasyan	Manifeste	Jazz	Naïve	
February 6	Ulrika Spacek	Expo		Full Time Hobby	
February 6	Wolverine	Anomalies		Music Theories Recordings	
February 11	Sk8star	Designer Junkie	Rage, trap	4th & B'way, Island	
February 12	Ray Stevens	Ray Stevens Favorites Old and New		Curb	
February 12	Sahara Hotnights	No One Ever Really Changes		Polydor, Universal	
February 13	Angel Dust	Cold 2 the Touch		Run for Cover	
February 13	Ásgeir	Julia		One Little Independent	
February 13	August Ponthier	Everywhere Isn't Texas		Nowhereland Sounds	
February 13	Bic Runga	Red Sunset		Bic Runga	
February 13	Brent Faiyaz	Icon	R&B	ISO Supremacy, UnitedMasters	
February 13	Charli XCX	Wuthering Heights		Atlantic	
February 13	Claire Rosinkranz	My Lover			
February 13	Converge	Love Is Not Enough	Hardcore punk, metalcore, sludge metal	Deathwish, Epitaph	
February 13	Danny L Harle	Cerulean		XL	
February 13	Femtanyl	Man Bites Dog	Digital hardcore	Entitii Records	
February 13	Feng	Weekend Rockstar		Regularisperfect	
February 13	Gogol Bordello	We Mean It, Man!	Gypsy punk, post-punk, folk punk	Casa Gogol Records	
February 13	Sir Spyro	2nd SQ		Deep Medi Musik	
February 13	Hemlocke Springs	The Apple Tree Under the Sea		AWAL	
February 13	Howling Bells	Strange Life		Nude	
February 13	Jill Scott	To Whom This May Concern	R&B, neo soul	Blues Babe, Human Re Sources	
February 13	Ledbyher	The Elephant			
February 13	The Lone Bellow	What a Time to Be Alive			
February 13	Mariachi El Bronx	Mariachi El Bronx IV		ATO	
February 13	Melissa Aldana	Filin		Blue Note	
February 13	Ms Banks	South Ldn Lover Girl			
February 13	Neba Solo and Benego Diakité	A Djinn and a Hunter Went Walking		Nonesuch	
February 13	Nina Badrić	Moji ljudi		Aquarius	
February 13	The Nude Party	Look Who's Back			
February 13	The Paranoid Style	Known Associates		Bar/None	
February 13	Remember Sports	The Refrigerator		Get Better	
February 13	Rufige Kru	Metal Giants		London	
February 13	Sarah Kinsley	Fleeting		Verve Forecast, Fontana	
February 13	Stetson, Fox & Dunn	Nethering		Envision Records, Invada	
February 13	Story of the Year	A.R.S.O.N.		SharpTone	
February 13	Tiana Major9	November Scorpio			
February 17	Willow	Petal Rock Black	Jazz fusion	Three Six Zero	
February 18	Lightning Strikes	The King Is Victorious			
February 18	Lovebites	Outstanding Power			
February 18	U2	Days of Ash	Rock	Island	
February 20	Absolutely	Paracosm	R&B, pop	Epic	
February 20	Apparat	A Hum of Maybe	Electronic	Mute	
February 20	Baby Keem	Casino	Hip-hop	PGLang, Columbia	
February 20	The Band of Heathens	Country Sides			
February 20	Elevation Worship	So Be It	Contemporary worship	Elevation Worship Records	
February 20	The Enemy	Social Disguises			
February 20	Exhumed	Red Asphalt		Relapse	
February 20	Hen Ogledd	Discombobulated	Alternative rock, experimental	Domino	
February 20	Hilary Duff	Luck... or Something		Atlantic	
February 20	Larry June, Currensy and the Alchemist	Spiral Staircases		Freeminded, Jet Life, Empire	
February 20	Leigh-Anne	My Ego Told Me To	Pop, R&B	Virgin Music	
February 20	May-a	Goodbye (If You Call That Gone)		Sony Australia	
February 20	Megan Moroney	Cloud 9	Country	Sony Music, Columbia	
February 20	Meg Mac	It's My Party		EMI Australia	
February 20	The Messthetics and James Brandon Lewis	Deface the Currency		Impulse!	
February 20	Michael Monroe	Outerstellar		Silver Lining Music	
February 20	Mirah	Dedication		Double Double Whammy	
February 20	Moby	Future Quiet	Ambient	BMG	
February 20	Mothica	Somewhere in Between		SharpTone	
February 20	Mumford & Sons	Prizefighter		Island	
February 20	Naïka	Eclesia		AWAL	
February 20	Nathan Fake	Evaporator	Electronic	InFiné	
February 20	New Found Glory	Listen Up!		Pure Noise	
February 20	Peaches	No Lube So Rude		Kill Rock Stars	
February 20	Squirtgun	Ghostly Sunflowers		Pirates Press	
February 20	Stone	Autonomy			
February 20	Sylosis	The New Flesh	Melodic death metal	Nuclear Blast	
February 20	Tom Busby	Rockhampton Hangover		Tom Busby	
February 20	Toys That Kill	Triple Sabotage		Recess	
February 20	Yungblud	Idols II		Locomotion, Island	
February 23	Ive	Revive+		Starship	
February 23	NCT JNJM	Both Sides	Hip-hop, R&B	SM	
February 24	Ceremony	Live at the Hollywood Palladium		Relapse	
February 27	Bibi Club	Amaro		Secret City	
February 27	Bill Callahan	My Days of 58	Alternative rock, indie folk, Americana	Drag City	
February 27	Bill Frisell	In My Dreams	Folk, jazz	Blue Note	
February 27	Blackpink	Deadline		YG	
February 27	Bruno Mars	The Romantic		Atlantic	
February 27	Buck Meek	The Mirror		4AD	
February 27	Carpenter Brut	Leather Temple			
February 27	Caterina Barbieri and Bendik Giske	At Source		Light-years	
February 27	Common Holly	They Will Draw Halos Around Our Heads		Keeled Scales, Paper Bag	
February 27	Crooked Fingers	Swet Deth			
February 27	Cryptic Shift	Overspace & Supertime		Metal Blade	
February 27	Deathcrash	Somersaults		Untitled (Recs)	
February 27	Donovan Woods	Squander Your Gifts			
February 27	Em Beihold	Tales of a Failed Shapeshifter		Republic	
February 27	Erin LeCount	Pareidolia		Atlantic	
February 27	Geese	Live at Third Man Records		Third Man	
February 27	Gena (Liv.e and Karriem Riggins)	The Pleasure Is Yours	Neo soul, hip-hop	Lex	
February 27	Gorillaz	The Mountain	World, synth-pop, psychedelia	Kong Records	
February 27	Heavenly	Highway to Heavenly		Fletcher Records, Skep Wax Records	
February 27	Hey Colossus	Heaven Was Wild			
February 27	Iron & Wine	Hen's Teeth		Sub Pop	
February 27	Kiss Facility (Mayah Alkhateri and Sega Bodega)	Khazna		Ambient Tweets	
February 27	Kwes	Kinds		Warp	
February 27	Lala Lala	Heaven 2		Sub Pop	
February 27	Ludovico Einaudi	Solo Piano		Decca	
February 27	Maria BC	Marathon	Ambient	Sacred Bones	
February 27	Mitski	Nothing's About to Happen to Me	Americana, art pop	Dead Oceans	
February 27	Motorpsycho	The Gaia II Space Corps	Psychedelic rock, hard rock	Det Nordenfjeldske Grammofonselskab	
February 27	Neal Morse Band	L.I.F.T.	Progressive rock	InsideOut, Century Media	
February 27	Nine Inch Nails	Tron Ares: Divergence		Interscope, Walt Disney, The Null Corporation	
February 27	Nothing	A Short History of Decay		Run for Cover	
February 27	Ólafur Arnalds	Sunrise Session III			
February 27	Pacific Avenue	Lovesick Sentimental		BMG	
February 27	Paul Gilbert	Wroc		Music Theories Records	
February 27	Ritt Momney	Base			
February 27	RJD2 and Supastition	According To...		Electrical Connections, Eavesdrop Music	
February 27	Rob Zombie	The Great Satan	Industrial metal, groove metal, thrash metal	Nuclear Blast	
February 27	Ruoska	Kade			
February 27	Shane Parish	Autechre Guitar	Acoustic, avant-garde	Palilalia Records	
February 27	Slagmaur	Hulders Ritual		Prophecy Productions	
February 27	Stephen O'Malley	Spheres Collapser			
February 27	Telenova	The Warning		EMI Australia	
February 27	A Thousand Horses	White Flag Down			
February 27	Varials	Where the Light Leaves	Hardcore punk, nu metal, metalcore	Fearless	
February 27	Voxtrot	Dreamers in Exile		Cult Hero Records	
February 27	The Wave Pictures	Gained / Lost			
February 27	A Wilhelm Scream	Cheap Heat		Creator-Destructor Records	
February 28	Juliana Hatfield and Eric Payne	Bets			

=== March ===
List of albums released in March 2026
Go to: January | February | April | May | June | Back to top
Release date	Artist	Album	Genre	Label	Ref.
March 1	Twin Peaks	Freezing in Chicago — Live at Thalia Hall, December 31st, 2017			
March 2	Quelle Chris	Happy Place			
March 3	John Pizzarelli	Dear Mr. Bennett		Green Hill Music	
March 6	Aaron Hibell	Synchronicity		Astralwerks	
March 6	Blackbraid	Nocturnal Womb			
March 6	Black Stone Cherry	Celebrate		Mascot	
March 6	Bonnie "Prince" Billy	We Are Together Again	Country	Domino, No Quarter Records	
March 6	Bosse-de-Nage	Hidden Fires Burn Hottest		The Flenser	
March 6	Cobrah	Torn		Atlantic	
March 6	Daniel Avery	Tremor (Midnight Versions)		Domino	
March 6	Erra	Silence Outlives the Earth	Progressive metalcore, djent	UNFD	
March 6	Flying Lotus	Big Mama	Electronic	Brainfeeder	
March 6	Gnarls Barkley	Atlanta		Atlantic, 10K Projects	
March 6	Gregory Uhlmann	Extra Stars		International Anthem	
March 6	Gum	Blue Gum Way		p(doom)	
March 6	Harry Styles	Kiss All the Time. Disco, Occasionally.		Columbia	
March 6	H.R and New Age Doom	Angels Against Angels			
March 6	Hunter Hayes	Evergreen			
March 6	Jenn Grant	Queen of the Strait			
March 6	Joshua Idehen	I Know You're Hurting, Everyone Is Hurting, Everyone Is Trying, You Have Got to Try	Electronic, dance, spoken word	Heavenly, PIAS	
March 6	Lost Society	Hell Is a State of Mind	Nu metal, metalcore	Nuclear Blast	
March 6	Morrissey	Make-Up Is a Lie		Sire, Warner	
March 6	Nettspend	Early Life Crisis	Rage, trap	Grade A, Interscope	
March 6	Osees	Cara Maluco		Deathgod Corp	
March 6	Prong	Live and Uncleansed		Steamhammer	
March 6	The Scythe	Strictly 4 the Scythe		Loma Vista	
March 6	Shabaka	Of the Earth		Shabaka Records	
March 6	Squeeze	Trixies		BMG	
March 6	Status/Non-Status	Big Changes		You've Changed	
March 6	Surfbort	Reality Star		TODO Records	
March 6	Tanya Tagaq	Saputjiji		Six Shooter	
March 6	Teenage Bottlerocket	Invisible Man		Pirates Press	
March 6	Various artists	Help(2)		War Child	
March 6	Vial	Hellhound		Trout Hole	
March 6	William Clark Green	Watterson Hall	Texas country, red dirt	Bill Grease Records	
March 6	Yebba	Jean		RCA	
March 8	Edo Maajka and Jazz Orkestar HRT-a	I Like to Dance		Dostava Zvuka	
March 10	Lice	Miami Lice: Season Four		Rhymesayers	
March 12	Health	R-Type II			
March 12	Moenia	Temporal		OCESA Seitrack, Promotodo México	
March 13	Alexis Taylor	Paris in the Spring		Night Time Stories	
March 13	Anjimile	You're Free to Go		4AD	
March 13	Art School Girlfriend	Lean In		Fiction	
March 13	Asia	Asia – Live in England		Frontiers Music Srl	
March 13	Beccy Cole	Through the Haze		ABC Music	
March 13	Ben Wendel	Barcode	Jazz	Edition	
March 13	Bill Orcutt	Music in Continuous Motion		Palilalia Records	
March 13	The Black Crowes	A Pound of Feathers		Silver Arrow	
March 13	Brigitte Calls Me Baby	Irreversible		ATO	
March 13	Bruiser Wolf	Push & Paint		Fake Shore Drive Records, Sheefy LLC	
March 13	Chalk	Crystalpunk	Post-punk, electronic rock, dance-punk	Alter Music	
March 13	Crack Cloud	Peace and Purpose		Meat Machine	
March 13	Cut Worms	Transmitter			
March 13	Daniel Romano's Outfit	Preservers of the Pearl		You've Changed	
March 13	Elucid and Sebb Bash	I Guess U Had to Be There	Hip-hop	Backwoodz Studioz	
March 13	Eric Cantona	Perfect Imperfection		Barclay, Fontana	
March 13	Foy Vance	The Wake		Rounder	
March 13	The Fray	A Light That Waits			
March 13	Gong	Bright Spirit		Kscope	
March 13	Gotthard	More Stereo Crush			
March 13	Haute and Freddy	Big Disgrace		Atlantic	
March 13	Jack Harlow	Monica	R&B	Atlantic	
March 13	James Blake	Trying Times		Good Boy Records	
March 13	Johnny Blue Skies & the Dark Clouds	Mutiny After Midnight		High Top Mountain, Atlantic Outpost	
March 13	Kim Gordon	Play Me	Trap, industrial, trip hop	Matador	
March 13	Lamb of God	Into Oblivion	Groove metal, metalcore	Century Media, Epic	
March 13	Laurel Halo	Midnight Zone		Awe	
March 13	Leven Kali	LK99		Def Jam	
March 13	The Monochrome Set	Lotus Bridge		Tapete	
March 13	Monstrosity	Screams from Beneath the Surface		Metal Blade	
March 13	Nili Brosh	Eventide			
March 13	The Notwist	News from Planet Zombie		Morr Music	
March 13	The Orielles	Only You Left		Heavenly	
March 13	P1Harmony	Unique		FNC	
March 13	The Scratch	Pull Like a Dog		Music for Nations, Sony Music Ireland	
March 13	Soft Machine	Thirteen	Jazz fusion	MoonJune	
March 13	Sweet Pill	Still There's a Glow		Hopeless	
March 13	Tinariwen	Hoggar	African blues, world	Wedge Record	
March 13	UnityTX	Somewhere, In Between...		Pure Noise	
March 13	Yonaka	Until You're Satisfied	Rock	Distiller Records	
March 16	Sophie May	Stars and Teeth			
March 17	Anthony Green	Reconcile at the Tile Works, Recorded Live		Born Losers	
March 17	Dropkick Murphys and Haywire	New England Forever		Dummy Luck Music, Play It Again Sam	
March 19	Ca7riel & Paco Amoroso	Free Spirits	Latin	5020 Records	
March 20	Alex Isley	When the City Sleeps		Free Lunch	
March 20	Anna Calvi	Is This All There Is?		Domino	
March 20	Avalon Emerson & the Charm	Written into Changes	Dream pop, synth-pop, electronica	Dead Oceans	
March 20	Axel Rudi Pell	Ghost Town		SPV/Steamhammer	
March 20	Aysanabee	Timelines		Ishkōdé Records	
March 20	Bad Dreems	Ultra Dundee		Gutto Records	
March 20	Boiled in Lead	King of the Dogwoods		Omnium Records	
March 20	BTS	Arirang		Big Hit	
March 20	Damaged Bug	Zuzax		Deathgod Corp	
March 20	The Dandy Warhols	Pin Ups		Beat the World, Little Cloud Records	
March 20	Dan Sultan	Live at Tubowgule (Sydney Opera House)		Mushroom Music	
March 20	The Dear Hunter	Sunya			
March 20	Dylan Brady	Needle Guy		Dog Show Records, Atlantic	
March 20	Ego Ella May	Good Intentions			
March 20	Exodus	Goliath	Thrash metal	Napalm	
March 20	Girl Group	Little Sticky Pictures		Boys Boys Boys	
March 20	Gladie	No Need to Be Lonely		Get Better	
March 20	Grace Ives	Girlfriend	Pop	True Panther, Polyvinyl	
March 20	Haircut One Hundred	Boxing the Compass			
March 20	Hurray for the Riff Raff	Live Forever		Nonesuch	
March 20	Joshua Burnside	It's Not Going to Be Okay		Joshua Burnside	
March 20	Kid Cudi	Have U Bn 2 Heaven @ Nite			
March 20	Ladytron	Paradises	Electronic	Nettwerk	
March 20	Luke Combs	The Way I Am	Country	Sony Music Nashville	
March 20	Manchester Orchestra	Union Chapel, London, England		Loma Vista	
March 20	Mclusky	I Sure Am Getting Sick of this Bowling Alley		Ipecac	
March 20	Mike Will Made It	R3set	Hip-hop	Eardrummer Records, Giant	
March 20	Morgan Evans	Steel Town	Country	VMG	
March 20	Naomi Scott	F.I.G		Alter Music	
March 20	Nessa Barrett	Jesus Loves a Primadonna	Alternative pop, dark pop, pop-rock	Warner	
March 20	Neurosis	An Undying Love for a Burning World	Post-metal, sludge metal, post-hardcore	Neurot	
March 20	Peach PRC	Porcelain		Island Australia, Republic	
March 20	Poison the Well	Peace in Place	Metalcore	SharpTone	
March 20	Samara Cyn	Detour			
March 20	Selah Sue and the Gallands	Movin'			
March 20	Son Little	Cityfolk	Soul	Anti-	
March 20	St. Vincent	Live in London!		Total Pleasure, Virgin Music Group	
March 20	Tedeschi Trucks Band	Future Soul		Fantasy	
March 20	Tyketto	Closer to the Sun		Silver Lining Music	
March 20	Underscores	U	Pop, hyperpop, dance-pop	Mom + Pop	
March 20	William Crighton	Colonial Drift		ABC Music	
March 20	Zhu	Black Midas			
March 23	Model/Actriz	Swan Songs		True Panther	
March 23	Yuna	Ice Cream		JYP	
March 24	Baby Dont Cry	After Cry		P Nation	
March 27	The Academy Is...	Almost There	Pop rock	I Surrender Records	
March 27	Actress and Suzanne Ciani	Concrète Waves		Werkdiscs	
March 27	Adult	Kissing Luck Goodbye		Dais	
March 27	Ashley Monroe	Dear Nashville		Mountainrose Sparrow	
March 27	Bernard Butler, Norman Blake, and James Grant	Murmurs		355 Recordings	
March 27	Black Label Society	Engines of Demolition		MNRK	
March 27	The Boxer Rebellion	The Second I'm Asleep			
March 27	Bugoy Drilon	Anthems		Bugoy Drilon, 314 Studios	
March 27	Buzzy Lee	Shoulder to Shoulder			
March 27	Cannons	Everything Glows			
March 27	Carnivore A.D.	Transmutation		Apostasy Records	
March 27	Central Cee	All Roads Lead Home	UK hip-hop, UK drill	Columbia	
March 27	The Casualties	Detonate		Hellcat	
March 27	Chamber	This is Goodbye...		Pure Noise	
March 27	Charlie Puth	Whatever's Clever!	Pop	Atlantic	
March 27	Charlotte Cornfield	Hurts Like Hell		Next Door Records, Merge	
March 27	Che	Fully Loaded		10K	
March 27	Cry Club	High Voltage Anxiety			
March 27	Courtney Barnett	Creature of Habit		Mom + Pop	
March 27	Dälek	Brilliance of a Falling Moon		Ipecac	
March 27	Dave Harrington and Tim Mislock	Isle of Palms		Maximum Overdub	
March 27	David Gray	Nightjar			
March 27	Don Broco	Nightmare Tripping	Nu metal, metalcore, rock	Fearless	
March 27	Elmiene	Sounds for Someone		Def Jam	
March 27	Fcukers	Ö		Ninja Tune	
March 27	Fetty Wap	Zavier			
March 27	Flatland Cavalry	Work of Heart		Lost Highway	
March 27	Flea	Honora	Jazz	Nonesuch	
March 27	Free Throw	Moments Before the Wind		Wax Bodega	
March 27	Good Riddance	Before the World Caves In		Fat Wreck Chords	
March 27	Hellripper	Coronach		Century Media	
March 27	Holy Fuck	Event Beat		AWAL	
March 27	Irreversible Entanglements	Future Present Past		Impulse!	
March 27	Jim Lauderdale	Country Super Hits Volume 2		SkyCrunch	
March 27	José González	Against the Dying of the Light		Mute	
March 27	Justine Skye	Candy		Warner	
March 27	King Tuff	Moo		Mup Records, Thirty Tigers	
March 27	Konradsen	Hunt, Gather		777 Music Records	
March 27	Kyle Falconer	Lovely Night of Terror		Modern Sky Records, Run On Records	
March 27	Lauren Auder	Whole World as Vigil			
March 27	Lava La Rue	Do You Know Everything?			
March 27	Lion's Share	Inferno		Metalville Records	
March 27	Lou Gramm	Released		HNE Records Ltd, Cherry Red	
March 27	Mallavora	What If Better Never Comes?		Church Road	
March 27	Melanie Martinez	Hades	Dark pop	Atlantic	
March 27	Melissa Etheridge	Rise		Sun Records	
March 27	Memorials (Verity Susman and Matthew Simms)	All Clouds Bring Not Rain		Fire	
March 27	Myrath	Wilderness of Mirrors	Progressive metal, power metal	earMUSIC	
March 27	Needtobreathe	The Long Surrender		MCA Nashville	
March 27	The New Pornographers	The Former Site Of	Indie folk	Merge	
March 27	Paula Kelley	Blinking as the Starlight Burns Out		Wharf Cat Records	
March 27	Raye	This Music May Contain Hope		Human Re Sources	
March 27	Robyn	Sexistential		Young	
March 27	Rum.gold	Is There Anybody Home?			
March 27	Seafret	Fear of Emotion		Nettwerk	
March 27	Slayyyter	Worst Girl in America		Records, Columbia	
March 27	Sluice	Companion		Mtn Laurel Recording Co.	
March 27	Snail Mail	Ricochet		Matador	
March 27	Suzi Quatro	Freedom		Chrysalis	
March 27	Threat Signal	Revelations		Agonia Records	
March 27	Tigers Jaw	Lost on You	Emo, indie rock	Hopeless	
March 27	Tom Misch	Full Circle			
March 27	Tommee Profitt	The Resurrection of a King		Capitol CMG	
March 27	The Twilight Sad	It's the Long Goodbye	Post-punk, indie rock	Rock Action	
March 27	Ty Myers	Heavy on the Soul			
March 27	Winterfylleth	The Unyielding Season		Napalm	
March 27	Yeat	ADL	Hip-hop	Lyfestyle Corporation, Field Trip, Capitol	
March 28	Kanye West	Bully	Hip-hop	YZY, Gamma	
March 30	Irene	Biggest Fan		SM, Kakao	
March 30	Jessie Reyez	Still Paid			
March 31	Amerikan Kaos	The Sheeple Swing		Metal Department	

== Second quarter ==
=== April ===
List of albums released in April 2026
Go to: January | February | March | May | June | Back to top
Release date	Artist	Album	Genre	Label	Ref.
April 2	Afroman	Freedom of Speech			
April 3	Angine de Poitrine	Vol. II	Experimental rock	Angine de Poitrine	
April 3	Arlo Parks	Ambiguous Desire		Transgressive	
April 3	Beatrice Deer	Inuit Legend		Uummati Records	
April 3	Ber	Good, Like It Should Be			
April 3	The Bevis Frond	Horrorful Heights		Fire	
April 3	Bon Iver	Volumes: One (Selections from Music Concerts 2019–2023 Bon Iver 6 Piece Band)		Jagjaguwar	
April 3	Bruce Hornsby and the Noisemakers	Indigo Park		Zappo Productions, Thirty Tigers	
April 3	The Builders and the Butchers	No Tomorrow		Badman Recording Co	
April 3	Charley Crockett	Age of the Ram		Island, Lone Star Rider Records	
April 3	Codefendants	Lifers			
April 3	Corrosion of Conformity	Good God / Baad Man		Nuclear Blast	
April 3	Dermot Kennedy	The Weight of the Woods		Island	
April 3	Earl Sweatshirt, Mike and Surf Gang	Pompeii // Utility	Hip-hop	10K, Tan Cressida, Surf Gang Records	
April 3	Good Kid	Can We Hang Out Sometime?	Indie rock	Good People Record Co.	
April 3	Grade 2	Talk About It			
April 3	Green Carnation	A Dark Poem, Pt. II: Sanguis	Doom metal, gothic metal, progressive metal	Season of Mist	
April 3	Green Carnation	A Dark Poem, Pt. III: The Messiah Complex	Gothic metal, progressive doom	Season of Mist	
April 3	Joe Pernice	Sunny, I Was Wrong		New West	
April 3	Katie Alice Greer	Perfect Woman Sound Machine, Vol. 1		GAK Records	
April 3	Lantlôs	Nowhere in Between Forever		Prophecy Productions	
April 3	Los Thuthanaka (Chuquimamani-Condori and Joshua Chuquimia Crampton)	Waq'a			
April 3	Maria Taylor	Story's End		Million Stars	
April 3	Michael Sweet	The Master Plan		Frontiers	
April 3	Nervosa	Slave Machine		Napalm	
April 3	Nine Vicious	Emotions	Hip-hop	Studio Addicts, Create Music	
April 3	Omah Lay	Clarity of Mind			
April 3	Population II	Gimmicks		Bonsound	
April 3	Los Retros	Odisea		Stones Throw	
April 3	Sam Barber	Broken View		Atlantic	
April 3	Sunn O)))	Sunn O)))		Sub Pop	
April 3	Swae Lee	Same Difference			
April 3	Tiffany Day	Halo	Hyperpop		
April 3	T.O.P	Another Dimension		Topspot Pictures	
April 3	Thundercat	Distracted		Brainfeeder	
April 3	U2	Easter Lily	Rock	Island	
April 3	Wendy Eisenberg	Wendy Eisenberg	Folk rock, country pop	Joyful Noise	
April 3	Zachary Baker	Dark Horse		Vngnz Records	
April 6	KickFlip	My First Kick		JYP	
April 7	Luísa Sonza	Brutal Paraíso	Pop	Sony Music	
April 8	Attila	Concrete Throne			
April 8	Hulvey	Could Be Tonight		Reach	
April 8	Party Wave	Dawn Patrol		River House Records	
April 9	Bini	Signals			
April 10	Alfie Boe	Face Myself			
April 10	Archspire	Too Fast to Die			
April 10	As Everything Unfolds	Did You Ask to Be Set Free?		Century Media	
April 10	Bilmuri	Kinda Hard		Columbia	
April 10	Bodysnatcher	Hell Is Here, Hell Is Home		MNRK	
April 10	Broadside	Nowhere, At Last		Thriller	
April 10	Ella Langley	Dandelion	Country	Sawgod Records, Columbia	
April 10	Enter Shikari	Lose Your Self		SO Recordings, Civilians	
April 10	Gregg Allman Band	Great As Ever: Live in Philadelphia '86	Rock	Sawright	
April 10	Hannah Lew	Hannah Lew	Synth-pop	Night School Records	
April 10	Holly Humberstone	Cruel World	Pop	Polydor	
April 10	I Am the Avalanche	The Horror Show		Equal Vision	
April 10	Immolation	Descent	Death metal	Nuclear Blast	
April 10	Joe Jackson	Hope and Fury		Sharp Practice Records, earMusic	
April 10	Leo Gassmann	Vita Vera Paradiso			
April 10	Lime Garden	Maybe Not Tonight		So Young Records	
April 10	Long Distance Calling	The Phantom Void		earMusic	
April 10	The Maine	Joy Next Door			
April 10	Mei Semones	Kurage		Bayonet Records	
April 10	Melechesh	Sentinels of Shamash		Reigning Phoenix	
April 10	Melvins and Napalm Death	Savage Imperial Death March		Ipecac	
April 10	Metal Church	Dead to Rights		Rat Pak Records	
April 10	My New Band Believe	My New Band Believe	Chamber pop, art rock	Rough Trade	
April 10	The Pictish Trail	Life Slime		Fire	
April 10	Serena Brancale	Sacro		Isola degli Artisti, Atlantic Records Italy, Warner Music Italy	
April 10	Snoop Dogg	10 Til' Midnight		Death Row, Gamma	
April 10	Squarepusher	Kammerkonzert		Warp	
April 10	Tigercub	Nets to Catch the Wind		Loosegroove	
April 10	T'Pau	Be Wonderful		Gnatfish Records	
April 10	Vomitory	In Death Throes		Metal Blade	
April 10	WU LYF	A Wave That Will Never Break			
April 13	Lone	Hyperphantasia			
April 13	Tomorrow X Together	7th Year: A Moment of Stillness in the Thorns		Hybe	
April 13	Wargasm	Live in London 2025			
April 14	Om Unit	Oracles		Local Action	
April 14	They Might Be Giants	The World Is to Dig	Alternative rock	Idlewild Records	
April 15	Heyoon	Seriously Unserious			
April 16	Anitta	Equilibrium		Republic	
April 16	Crystal Murray	Anatomy of a Cry			
April 17	Anne Hathaway	Mother Mary: Greatest Hits		A24 Music	
April 17	Arkells	Between Us		Universal Music Canada	
April 17	Brother Cane	Magnolia Medicine		Double Dragon Records	
April 17	Cameron Whitcomb	Deep Water			
April 17	Charley	The Chronicles of a Serial Idealist		EMI Music Australia	
April 17	Crimson Glory	Chasing the Hydra		BraveWords Records	
April 17	Crippled Black Phoenix	Sceaduhelm		Season of Mist	
April 17	Finn Askew	Blueboy			
April 17	Frog	Frog for Sale		Audio Antihero, Tape Wormies	
April 17	From Ashes to New	Reflections		Better Noise	
April 17	Hardline	Shout		Steamhammer/SPV	
April 17	Hermitude	Eight		Heavy Weather	
April 17	Honey Dijon	Nightlife			
April 17	Jessie Ware	Superbloom		EMI	
April 17	Kuru	Backstage Hologram	Trap	DeadAir	
April 17	The Last Ten Seconds of Life	The Dead Ones		Metal Blade	
April 17	LØLØ	God Forbid a Girl Spits Out Her Feelings!	Pop rock	Fearless	
April 17	Matt Corby	Tragic Magic		Island Australia	
April 17	M.I.A.	M.I.7	Pop, Christian	Ohmni Music	
April 17	Nine Inch Noize	Nine Inch Noize	Industrial rock	The Null Corporation, Boysnoize	
April 17	Prince Daddy & the Hyena	Hotwire Trip Switch		Counter Intuitive	
April 17	Nekrogoblikon	The Boiling Sea			
April 17	Seether	Beneath the Surface		Concord	
April 17	Skindred	You Got This		Earache	
April 17	Sofia Isella	Something Is a Shell			
April 17	Souled American	Sanctions		Jealous Butcher Records	
April 17	Tanya Donelly and Chris Brokaw	The Undone Is Done Again		Fire	
April 17	Teen Suicide	Nude Descending Staircase Headless		Run for Cover	
April 17	Tiga	HotLife	Electronic, dance		
April 17	Thundermother	Live'n'Alive		Napalm	
April 17	Tomora	Come Closer	Electronica, trip hop, techno	Capitol	
April 17	Væb	Væbout		Alda Musicis	
April 17	Vanessa Carlton	Veils		Liberman Records	
April 17	Wage War	It Calls Me by Name	Metalcore	Fearless	
April 17	Yaya Bey	Fidelity	R&B	Drink sum wtr	
April 17	Zayn	Konnakol	Pop, R&B	Mercury, Island	
April 18	Air	Moon Safari – The Athens Concert			
April 18	Collective Soul	Touch and Go		Fuzze-Flex Records	
April 18	Look Outside Your Window	Look Outside Your Window			
April 18	Dallas Good and Richard Reed Parry	Were "The Watchtowers"		Yep Roc	
April 18	DoPE (Chuck D and John Densmore)	No Country for Old Men		Org Music	
April 18	Roy Hargrove	Bern	Jazz	Time Traveler Recordings	
April 20	Steve Asheim	Volume One		SteevoRecords	
April 21	Azealia Banks	Zenzealia		Pleasure Place	
April 22	Akon	Beautiful Day		Konvict Kulture	
April 22	Dorian Electra	Dorian Electra			
April 23	Vomit Forth	In the Name of the Father			
April 24	The Amity Affliction	House of Cards		Pure Noise	
April 24	Angélique Kidjo	Hope!!		Warner	
April 24	Angelo De Augustine	Angel in Plainclothes		Asthmatic Kitty	
April 24	Atreyu	The End Is Not the End	Alternative metal, metalcore	Spinefarm	
April 24	At the Gates	The Ghost of a Future Dead		Century Media	
April 24	The Cab	Chasing Crowns			
April 24	Cadence Weapon	Forager		Six Shooter	
April 24	Carla dal Forno	Confession		Kallista Records	
April 24	Cavs	Sojourn		p(doom)	
April 24	Dale Watson	Unwanted		Forty Below Records	
April 24	Doug Gillard	Parallel Stride		Dromedary Records	
April 24	Elegant Weapons	Evolution		Exciter Records	
April 24	Failure	Location Lost			
April 24	Fatboi Sharif and Child Actor	Crayola Circles		Backwoodz Studioz	
April 24	Foo Fighters	Your Favorite Toy		Roswell, RCA	
April 24	Friko	Something Worth Waiting For	Indie rock	ATO	
April 24	Gia Margaret	Singing		Jagjaguwar	
April 24	Glen Hansard	Don't Settle – Transmissions East		Plateau Records, Secretly	
April 24	Gus G	Steel Burner		Metal Department Records	
April 24	Guvna B	This Bed I Made			
April 24	Hrishikesh Hirway	In the Last Hour of Light			
April 24	Irmin Schmidt	Requiem		Mute, Future Days	
April 24	Jason Aldean	Songs About Us	Country, country rock	BBR, Macon Music	
April 24	John Corabi	New Day		Frontiers	
April 24	Julia Cumming	Julia		Partisan	
April 24	Kehlani	Kehlani		Atlantic, TSNMI	
April 24	Lightning Bolt and OOIOO	The Horizon Spirals / The Horizon Viral		Thrill Jockey	
April 24	Meghan Trainor	Toy with Me		Epic	
April 24	Metric	Romanticize the Dive		Thirty Tigers	
April 24	Mikaela Davis	Graceland Way		Kill Rock Stars	
April 24	The Milk Carton Kids	Lost Cause Lover Fool		Far Cry Records, Thirty Tigers	
April 24	Miss Grit	Under My Umbrella		Mute	
April 24	Noah Kahan	The Great Divide	Folk, folk rock, Americana	Mercury	
April 24	Nxdia	Lovemesick			
April 24	Oliver Tree	Love You Madly Hate You Badly		Atlantic	
April 24	Plini	An Unnameable Desire			
April 24	Portrayal of Guilt	...Beginning of the End		Run for Cover	
April 24	Ringo Starr	Long Long Road	Country rock, country	UMe	
April 24	Reverend and the Makers	Is This How Happiness Feels?			
April 24	Ruby Fields	Small Achievements		Ruby Fields	
April 24	The Saddest Landscape	Alone with Heaven		Iodine	
April 24	Sepultura	The Cloud of Unknowing		Nuclear Blast	
April 24	Setting	Setting		Thrill Jockey	
April 24	Six Feet Under	Next to Die		Metal Blade	
April 24	Terror	Still Suffer	Hardcore punk	Flatspot Records	
April 24	Trueno	Turr4zo			
April 24	White Denim	13		Bella Union	
April 24	White Fence	Orange		Drag City	
April 24	Yoasobi	E-Side 4		Echoes, Sony Japan	
April 28	Truthpaste	I Don't Know Either		Dirty Hit, Memorials of Distinction	
April 29	Duendita	Existential Thottie		10K Global	
April 30	Illit	Mamihlapinatapai		Belift Lab	
April 30	Octo Octa	Sigils for Survival		T4T LUV NRG	
April 30	Oddisee and Heno	From Takoma with Love		Outer Note	
April 30	One Ok Rock	Live from Japan Detox Tour 2025			

=== May ===
List of albums released in May 2026
Go to: January | February | March | April | June | Back to top
Release date	Artist	Album	Genre	Label	Ref.
May 1	American Football	American Football	Post-rock, emo	Polyvinyl	
May 1	Ana Roxanne	Poem 1		Kranky	
May 1	Asake	M$ney		Empire	
May 1	The Black Keys	Peaches!		Easy Eye Sound, Warner	
May 1	Blarf	Film Scores for Films That Don't Exist		Stones Throw	
May 1	Bonner Kramer and Thurston Moore	They Came Like Swallows – Seven Requiems for the Children of Gaza	Ambient, avant-rock	Silver Current	
May 1	The Boo Radleys	In Spite of Everything		Boostr Records	
May 1	The Claypool Lennon Delirium	The Great Parrot-Ox and the Golden Egg of Empathy		ATO	
May 1	The Dead Daisies	Live Plus Five			
May 1	Dodgy	Hello Beautiful			
May 1	Durand Bernarr	Bernarr			
May 1	Emma Louise	Sunshine for Happiness			
May 1	Ernest	Deep Blue		Big Loud	
May 1	Geordie Gordon	River Round		Victory Pool Records	
May 1	Haste the Day	Dissenter		Solid State	
May 1	Hiss Golden Messenger	I'm People		Chrysalis	
May 1	Isaiah Rashad	It's Been Awful		TDE, Warner	
May 1	Jesca Hoop	Long Wave Home		Last Laugh Records, Republic of Music Records	
May 1	Kacey Musgraves	Middle of Nowhere		Lost Highway	
May 1	Kneecap	Fenian		Heavenly	
May 1	Laibach	Musick		Mute	
May 1	Lair of the Minotaur	I Hail I		The Grind-House Records	
May 1	Lip Critic	Theft World	Digital hardcore, electro-punk	Partisan	
May 1	Maya Hawke	Maitreya Corso		Mom + Pop	
May 1	Melanie C	Sweat	Dance	Virgin Music	
May 1	North West	N0rth4evr	Rage	Gamma	
May 1	Oteil Burbridge and Lamar Williams Jr.	The Offering		Floki Studios	
May 1	People I've Met	Bunny		Interscope	
May 1	Rachael Fahim	Who You Are		Island Australia, Universal Australia	
May 1	Rita Wilson	Sound of a Woman		Sing it Loud Records	
May 1	Seefeel	Sol.Hz		Warp	
May 1	Sevendust	One	Alternative metal, hard rock	Napalm	
May 1	Tauren Wells	Breathe on It		Sparrow, Capitol CMG	
May 1	Toadies	The Charmer		Spaceflight Records	
May 1	Tori Amos	In Times of Dragons		Universal, Fontana	
May 1	Trials	Hendle		Island Australia	
May 1	Venom	Into Oblivion	Heavy metal, thrash metal, black metal	Noise, BMG	
May 1	Weird Nightmare	Hoopla		Sub Pop	
May 1	Young the Giant	Victory Garden			
May 1	Youbet	Youbet		Hardly Art	
May 1	Zara Larsson	Midnight Sun: Girls Trip		Sommer House, Epic	
May 2	Upsammy and Valentina Magaletti	Seismo		PAN	
May 4	Cortis	GreenGreen		Big Hit	
May 4	Babymonster	Choom		YG	
May 5	Alabaster DePlume	Dear Children of Our Children, I Knew: Epilogue		International Anthem	
May 7	Blue Lab Beats	The Blue Lab Beats Show			
May 7	Carín León	Muda			
May 8	Abigail Lapell	Shadow Child			
May 8	Aldous Harding	Train on the Island		4AD	
May 8	Amy Grant	The Me That Remains	Folk pop	Thirty Tigers	
May 8	Ashley McBryde	Wild		Warner Music Nashville	
May 8	Basement	Wired		Run for Cover	
May 8	Black Veil Brides	Vindicate		Spinefarm	
May 8	Broken Social Scene	Remember the Humans		Arts & Crafts	
May 8	Brother Wallace	Electric Love	Soul, R&B	ATO	
May 8	Chinese American Bear	Dim Sum & Then Some		Moshi Moshi	
May 8	Chris Brown	Brown	R&B	RCA, CBE	
May 8	Cola	Cost of Living Adjustment		Fire Talk Records	
May 8	Crashdïet	Art of Chaos		Ninetone	
May 8	Croz Boyce (Avey Tare and Geologist)	Croz Boyce		Domino	
May 8	Darkthrone	Pre-Historic Metal		Peaceville	
May 8	Daughn Gibson	Lake Mary Not Mysterious			
May 8	Deb Never	Arcade		Giant Music	
May 8	Draconian	In Somnolent Ruin	Gothic metal, doom metal	Napalm	
May 8	Fire-Toolz	Lavender Networks		Warp	
May 8	The Flatliners	Cold World		Rude Records, Equal Vision	
May 8	Frozen Soul	No Place of Warmth		Century Media	
May 8	Glaive and Kurtains	God Save the Three		Broke	
May 8	India Ramey	Villain Era	Country	Copaco, Blue Élan	
May 8	Ingested	Denigration		Metal Blade	
May 8	Josh Groban	Cinematic		Reprise	
May 8	Josiah and the Bonnevilles	As Is		Rounder	
May 8	The Jungle Giants	Experiencing Feelings of Joy		Amplifire Music	
May 8	Koyo	Barely Here		Pure Noise	
May 8	The Lemon Twigs	Look for Your Mind!	Power pop, psychedelic rock	Captured Tracks	
May 8	Linda Perry	Let It Die Here		670 Records, Kill Rock Stars	
May 8	Little Simz	Sugar Girl			
May 8	Loraine James	Detached from the Rest of You	Electronic, IDM, glitch	Hyperdub	
May 8	Lykke Li	The Afterparty		Neon Gold, Futures	
May 8	Max Cooper	Feeling Is Structure			
May 8	Muna	Dancing on the Wall	Pop	Saddest Factory, Secretly Records	
May 8	Namasenda	Limbo		Year0001	
May 8	Neil Diamond	Wild at Heart		Capitol, Universal	
May 8	Nicholas Krgovich	Boss Tape		Orindal Records	
May 8	Olof Dreijer	Loud Boom		DH2	
May 8	Panopticon	Det Hjemsøkte Hjertet		Bind Rune, Nordvis	
May 8	Royal & the Serpent	Emptiness Is Godly		Atlantic	
May 8	Runo Plum	Bloom Again		Winspear	
May 8	Seu Jorge	The Other Side			
May 8	Shye Ben Tzur and Jonny Greenwood with the Rajasthan Express	Ranjha		World Circuit Records, BMG	
May 8	Social Distortion	Born to Kill	Punk rock, rock and roll	Epitaph	
May 8	Stephen Sanchez	Love, Love, Love		Mercury	
May 8	Thaiboy Digital and Swedm®	Paradise	EDM, trance	Bank of Star Sound System	
May 8	War on Women	Time Under Tension		Smartpunk	
May 8	Zsela, Daniel Aged, and Taul Katz	4 Dreams			
May 11	Nmixx	Heavy Serenade		JYP, Republic	
May 12	Gun Outfit	Process & Reality		Upset the Rhythm	
May 13	Kwes Darko	God of the Youth			
May 14	Lady Gaga	Apple Music Live: Mayhem Requiem		Interscope	
May 14	Leroy	Status Update Music	Dariacore, EDM	Jane Remover	
May 14	Porches	Mask			
May 14	Salem	Red Dragon		Many Hats	
May 15	49 Winchester	Change of Plans	Alternative country, Americana	MCA Nashville, Lucille Records	
May 15	Acid Reign	Daze of the Week			
May 15	The All-American Rejects	Sandbox		Slick Shoes Records	
May 15	Bnyx	Genesis FM			
May 15	Brooke Fraser	Eat	Worship	Sparrow, Academy Records, Capitol CMG	
May 15	Crown Lands	Apocalypse		Inside Out	
May 15	Dead Pony	Eat My Dust!		ADA	
May 15	Drake	Habibti	R&B	OVO, Republic	
May 15	Drake	Iceman	Hip-hop	OVO, Republic	
May 15	Drake	Maid of Honour	Dance	OVO, Republic	
May 15	Dua Saleh	Of Earth & Wires	Pop, R&B	Ghostly International	
May 15	The Field	Now You Exist		Studio Barnhus	
May 15	Genesis Owusu	Redstar Wu & the Worldwide Scourge	Neo soul, alt-pop, synth-punk	Ourness	
May 15	The Hoosiers	Compassion		Crab Race	
May 15	Ikkimel	Poppstar			
May 15	Jungle Rot	Cruel Face of War		Unique Leader Records	
May 15	Kevin Morby	Little Wide Open		Dead Oceans	
May 15	Kreidler	Schemes		Bureau B	
May 15	Lucki	Dr*gs R Bad	Hip-hop	Empire	
May 15	Maluma	Loco X Volver			
May 15	Martyn	Music for Existing			
May 15	Mirador	The Gathering at Badon Hill		Republic	
May 15	Mya	Retrospect		Planet 9	
May 15	Periphery	A Pale White Dot		3DOT Records	
May 15	Peter Frampton	Carry the Light		UMe	
May 15	Pro-Pain	Stone Cold Anger		Napalm	
May 15	Robin Beck	Living Proof		Frontiers Music	
May 15	Ryan Bingham & The Texas Gentlemen	They Call Us the Lucky Ones		The Bingham Recording Company, Thirty Tigers	
May 15	Smerz	Easy EP			
May 15	Spencer Krug	Same Fangs		Pronounced Kroog	
May 15	Stella Lefty	Is This Heaven?	Country pop, indie folk	Atlantic Outpost	
May 15	Tank and the Bangas	The Last Balloon		Verve Forecast	
May 15	Towa Bird	Gentleman		Interscope, Polydor	
May 15	The Virginmarys	Beyond the House of Fires			
May 18	Itzy	Motto		JYP, Republic	
May 18	Taeyong	Wyld		SM	
May 19	Balming Tiger	Gongbu			
May 19	I.O.I	I.O.I: Loop		Swing	
May 19	Xikers	Route Zero: The Ora		KQ	
May 21	The Coral	388			
May 21	JPEGMafia	Experimental Rap	Experimental hip-hop	AWAL	
May 22	6lack	Love Is the New Gangsta		LVRN, Interscope	
May 22	A	Prang		Cooking Vinyl	
May 22	Aja Monet	The Color of the Rain		Drink sum wtr	
May 22	Alela Diane	Who's Keeping Time?		Fluff and Gravy Records, Loose Music	
May 22	Ali Sethi and Gregory Rogove	Room Jhoom			
May 22	Alt Blk Era	Our World		LAB	
May 22	Armored Saint	Emotion Factory Reset	Heavy metal	Metal Blade	
May 22	Ayreon	30th Anniversary - An Amazing Flight Through Time		Music Theories Recordings	
May 22	Bill Orcutt and Mabe Fratti	Almost Waking	Experimental	Unheard of Hope	
May 22	Bladee	Sulfur Surfer	Cloud rap	Trash Island	
May 22	Bleachers	Everyone for Ten Minutes		Dirty Hit	
May 22	Cabaret Voltaire	But What Time Is It Really?			
May 22	Christian Nodal	Bandera Blanca		JG Music, Sony Music México	
May 22	Crash of Rhinos	Logbook		12:01 Recordings, To Lose la Track, Storm Chasers, Stiff Slack	
May 22	Dimmu Borgir	Grand Serpent Rising		Nuclear Blast	
May 22	Dua Lipa	Dua Lipa - Live from Mexico			
May 22	Ecca Vandal	Looking for People to Unfollow		Loma Vista	
May 22	Ed O'Brien	Blue Morpho		Transgressive	
May 22	Erik Grönwall	Bad Bones			
May 22	Fakemink	Terrified	Cloud rap	EtnaVeraVela	
May 22	Future Islands	From a Hole in the Floor to a Fountain of Youth		4AD	
May 22	Kingswood	Midnight Mavericks		ABC Music	
May 22	Le Sserafim	Pureflow Pt. 1		Source, YG Plus, Geffen	
May 22	Lowertown	Ugly Duckling Union		Summer Shade Records	
May 22	Maisie Peters	Florescence		Gingerbread Man, Asylum	
May 22	Marisa Anderson	The Anthology of Unamerican Folk Music		Thrill Jockey	
May 22	Marmozets	Co.War.Dice.		Alcopop!	
May 22	Moses Sumney and Joseph Shirley	Is God Is		Lakeshore	
May 22	Nashville Pussy	10 Inches of Pussy Season 1		Slinging Pig Records	
May 22	Tim Kasher's Home Phone	Sponges of Experience		Born Losers	
May 22	Veeze	Y'all Won			
May 22	Visible Cloaks	Paradessence		RVNG Intl.	
May 22	Vision Divine	A Clockwork Reverie		Scarlet	
May 25	RaiNao	Marcriá	Reggaeton, Latin pop, R&B	Rimas	
May 26	And2ble	Sequence 01: Curiosity		YH	
May 26	Eddy Current Suppression Ring	In Light of Recent Events			
May 26	Feeble Little Horse	Bitknot	Indie rock, shoegaze	Saddle Creek	
May 27	Ayase	Dialogue		Echoes, Sony Japan	
May 28	'68	They Are Survived			
May 29	Aespa	Lemonade		SM, Kakao	
May 29	All Them Witches	House of Mirrors			
May 29	Boards of Canada	Inferno		Warp	
May 29	The Bug Club	Every Single Muscle	Garage punk	Sub Pop	
May 29	Dark Divine	Undead Melody		Thriller	
May 29	David Torn	Now I Imagine a Place Not the Same		Kou Records	
May 29	Devin Townsend	The Moth	Symphonic metal, avant-garde metal, progressive metal	Inside Out, HevyDevy	
May 29	Digitalism	Optimism			
May 29	Dogstar	All In Now		Dillon Street Records	
May 29	Ear	Rumspringa	Electronica	A24 Music	
May 29	Elder	Through Zero		Blues Funeral Records, Stickman Records	
May 29	Francis of Delirium	Run, Run Pure Beauty		Dalliance Recordings	
May 29	Freya Ridings	Mother of Pearl		BMG	
May 29	Greg Mendez	Beauty Land		Dead Oceans	
May 29	Guided by Voices	Crawlspace of the Pantheon		GBV Inc	
May 29	Iceage	For Love of Grace & the Hereafter	Indie rock, post-punk	Mexican Summer	
May 29	Joakim Berg	Framtiden som aldrig blev av	Pop rock	UMG	
May 29	Joe Lovano	Paramount Quartet	Jazz	ECM	
May 29	Kiefer Sutherland	Grey			
May 29	Kim Petras	Detour		Amigo, BunHead Records	
May 29	Kurt Vile	Philadelphia's Been Good to Me		Verve Forecast	
May 29	Labrinth	Cosmic Opera Act II			
May 29	Latto	Big Mama	Hip-hop	RCA, Steamcut Records	
May 29	Lenka	Good Days	Pop	Skipalong	
May 29	Lynch Mob	The Final Ride		Frontiers	
May 29	Neil Young and the Chrome Hearts	As Time Explodes			
May 29	Paul McCartney	The Boys of Dungeon Lane		MPL, Capitol	
May 29	The Real McKenzies	Sings on Yer Bike		Coretex Records	
May 29	Renée Fleming and Béla Fleck	The Fiddle and the Drum	Americana, folk, bluegrass	Thirty Tigers	
May 29	Rodney Atkins	True South		Curb	
May 29	Shinedown	Eight	Hard rock	Atlantic	
May 29	Sparta	Cut a Silhouette		Equal Vision, Dine Alone	
May 29	Static Dress	Injury Episode			
May 29	Turnover	Down on Earth			
May 29	Violet Grohl	Be Sweet to Me	Alternative rock, grunge	Auroura Records, Republic	
May 29	Willie Nelson	Dream Chaser	Country	Sony Music	

=== June ===
List of albums released in June 2026
Go to: January | February | March | April | May | Back to top
Release date	Artist	Album	Genre	Label	Ref.
June 1	Meovv	Bite Now		The Black Label	
June 1	Shinee	Atmos		SM	
June 3	Siiickbrain	Houndstooth		Nowhere Records	
June 4	Tender	Where the Waves Break		Nettwerk	
June 5	The 69 Eyes	I Survive		BlkIIBlk	
June 5	100 Demons	Embrace the Black Light			
June 5	August Burns Red	Season of Surrender	Metalcore	Fearless	
June 5	Barry Manilow	What a Time		Stiletto Entertainment	
June 5	Bedouine	Neon Summer Skin		Thirty Tigers	
June 5	Big Special	O'Joy!		SO Recordings	
June 5	Converge	Hum of Hurt	Metalcore	Epitaph	
June 5	Cyhra	Requiem for a Pipe Dream		Reigning Phoenix	
June 5	Dea Matrona	Hate That I Care			
June 5	Death Cab for Cutie	I Built You a Tower		Anti-	
June 5	Deer Tick	Coin-O-Matic		ATO	
June 5	DJ Seinfeld	If This Is It		Ninja Tune	
June 5	The Dwarves	Jenkem		Greedy Records	
June 5	Eleanor Shanley and Mike Hanrahan	The Ghost of You			
June 5	Ella Hunt	Blindspot		Historical Fiction Records	
June 5	Evanescence	Sanctuary		BMG	
June 5	Evergrey	Architects of a New Weave		Napalm	
June 5	Fink	The City Is Coming to Erase It All		R'Coup'D	
June 5	Fucked Up	Grass Can Move Stones Part 2: Year of the Monkey		Hidden World	
June 5	Grey DeLisle and Les Greene	Grey & Greene		Hummin'bird Records, CRS	
June 5	Holly Humberstone	It's a Real Cruel World		Polydor	
June 5	HorsegiirL	Nature Is Healing		RCA	
June 5	Isabel LaRosa	Promising New Woman			
June 5	Jalen Ngonda	Doctrine of Love		Daptone	
June 5	Jared James Nichols	Louder Than Fate		Frontiers	
June 5	Jared Mattson and Ruban Nielson	Fear		Jagjaguwar	
June 5	Jeff Goldblum and the Mildred Snitzer Orchestra	Night Blooms		Fontana	
June 5	Jo Dee Messina	Bridges	Country	Dreambound Records	
June 5	Laura Marling	Laura Sings Raffi			
June 5	Lee "Scratch" Perry and Mouse on Mars	Spatial, No Problem		Domino	
June 5	Liz Lawrence	Vespers		Chrysalis	
June 5	Lizzo	Bitch		Nice Life, Atlantic	
June 5	Malcolm Todd	Do That Again	Indie pop	Columbia	
June 5	Modest Mouse	An Eraser and a Maze	Indie rock	Glacial Pace	
June 5	Niall Horan	Dinner Party		Capitol	
June 5	of Montreal	Aethermead		Polyvinyl	
June 5	Old Crow Medicine Show	Union Made		Hartland Records	
June 5	Osees	Off Course		Deathgod Records	
June 5	Poppy Ackroyd	Liminal		One Little Independent	
June 5	The Red Clay Strays	Grateful		HBYCO Records, RCA	
June 5	Roger Sanchez	Spectrum		Undr The Radr, Stealth Recordings	
June 5	Rosa Walton	Tell Me It's a Dream	Synth-pop, indie pop, alternative pop	Transgressive	
June 5	Seahaven	Seahaven		Pure Noise	
June 5	Shane Embury	Bridge to Resolution		Dissonance Productions	
June 5	Skrillex	Soma		Owsla	
June 5	Slift	Fantasia		Sub Pop	
June 5	Thomas Bangalter	Mirage			
June 5	Vika and Linda	Where Do You Come From?		Mushroom Music	
June 5	Vince Staples	Cry Baby		Loma Vista	
June 5	Vybz Kartel	God & Time	Dancehall	TJ Records, Vybz Kartel Musik	
June 5	Widowspeak	Roses		Captured Tracks	
June 5	Wu-Lu and Poison Anna	Bakerz Dozen		Warp	
June 5	Zoh Amba	Eyes Full		Matador	
June 8	BoyNextDoor	Home		KOZ Entertainment	
June 10	Baauer	U		LuckyMe	
June 10	Otoboke Beaver	Is the New Album Out Yet?		Damably	
June 11	YHWH Nailgun	Magazine		4AD	
June 12	Alex Amen	Sun of Amen		ATO	
June 12	Ambrose Akinmusire and Mary Halvorson	Slo-Mo Neon Luminate Hoverings		Nonesuch	
June 12	Bebe Rexha	Dirty Blonde		Empire	
June 12	Big Brave	In Grief or in Hope			
June 12	Big D and the Kids Table	The Good Ole American Saturday Night		SideOneDummy	
June 12	Blxst	Labor of Love		Empire, International Blxst	
June 12	The Bobby Lees	New Self		Epitaph	
June 12	CFCF	L.U.V. (Life in Ultra Violet)		BGM Solutions	
June 12	Dagny	Dancefloor Erotica		Little Daggers Records	
June 12	Dirty Heads	7 Seas		Better Noise Music	
June 12	Des Rocs	To Hell and Back		Sumerian	
June 12	Embrace	Avalanche		Cooking Vinyl	
June 12	Fleshcrawl	Epitome of Carnage		Distortion Music Group	
June 12	Fruit Bats	The Landfill		Merge	
June 12	Genghis Tron	Signal Fire		Relapse	
June 12	Goose	Big Modern!		No Coincidence Records	
June 12	Hayley Kiyoko	Girls Like Girls			
June 12	Horse Lords	Demand to Be Taken to Heaven Alive!		RVNG Intl.	
June 12	Jessie Reyez	A Little Vengeance		FMLY, Island	
June 12	Jesse Welles	Masks Off			
June 12	Johnny Orlando	Songs for Young Lovers			
June 12	Jon Spencer	Songs of Personal Loss and Protest		Shove Records	
June 12	Josh Pyke	Kingdom Within		ADA	
June 12	Keith Urban	Flow State	Yacht rock		
June 12	Kelsey Lu	So Help Me God		Dirty Hit	
June 12	Khemmis	Khemmis		Nuclear Blast	
June 12	Mekons	Horrorble (Mekons vs. Tony Maimone in Dub Conference)		Fire	
June 12	Midland	Stages		Blue Highway Records	
June 12	Mike Campbell & The Dirty Knobs	Mission of Mercy			
June 12	Mon Laferte	Femme Fatale Vol. 2		Sony Music Latin	
June 12	Olivia Rodrigo	You Seem Pretty Sad for a Girl So in Love		Geffen	
June 12	Piebald	Tales for the Rages		Iodine	
June 12	Pussy Riot	CYKA			
June 12	Rachel Bolan	Gargoyle of the Garden State		earMusic	
June 12	Ruel	Kicking My Feet & Screaming			
June 12	La Sécurité	Bingo!		Bella Union, Mothland Records	
June 12	Sleeping with Sirens	An Ending in Itself	Post-hardcore, alternative rock, pop-punk	Rise	
June 12	Sonny Fodera	Can We Do It All Again?		Solotoko	
June 12	South Summit	Run It Back			
June 12	Spacey Jane	Exit Wounds		AWAL, Concord	
June 12	Spread Eagle	The Brutal Divine		Frontiers	
June 12	Still Remains	Spirit Breaker		Arson Theory	
June 12	Stitched Up Heart	Medusa			
June 12	Sublime	Until the Sun Explodes		Atlantic	
June 12	Tarja Turunen	Frisson Noir	Symphonic metal	earMUSIC	
June 12	Tori Kelly	God Must Really Love Me	Pop, R&B, gospel	Epic	
June 12	Wiki	Ancient History	Hip-hop	Wikset Enterprise	
June 12	Yes	Aurora	Progressive rock	InsideOut, Sony	
June 15	Riize	II		SM, RCA	
June 19	Ama	Ama		ISO Supremacy, Pulse Records	
June 19	Belvedere	Seven Years of Bad Luck		Thousand Islands Records	
June 19	Big Freedia and Sophie	Released at Last			
June 19	Graham Coxon	Castle Park	Power pop, garage rock	Transgressive	
June 19	Hard-Fi	Sweating Someone Else's Fever		V2	
June 19	Honestav	Sweet American Boy		Rebel Music, Gamma	
June 19	Jon Batiste	Black Mozart (Batiste Piano Series, Vol. 2)		Decca	
June 19	The Limiñanas	Live at Beaubourg		Because Music	
June 19	Natasha Hamilton	Extraction		Morpho Records	
June 19	Matt Proxy	Trojan Horse	Experimental hip-hop	Listen to the Kids	
June 19	Myles Smith	My Mess, My Heart, My Life		Sony Music UK, It's Okay to Feel	
June 19	PJ Morton	Saturday Night/Sunday Morning		Morton Records, SRG-ILS Group	
June 19	Pond	Terrestrials		Mangovision, Secretly Distribution	
June 19	Pyncher	I Really Mean It This Time		Heist or Hit	
June 19	Swim Deep	Hum		Submarine Cat Records	
June 19	Tierra Whack	Whack's Museum			
June 19	Tucker Zimmerman	Dream Me a Dream		Big Potato Records	
June 19	The War and Treaty	The Story of Michael and Tanya		Atlantic Outpost	
June 19	Warning	Rituals of Shame		Relapse	
June 19	YG	The Gentlemen's Club	West coast hip-hop	4Hunnid, 10K Projects	
June 21	Pz'	No Turning Back	Rage, trap	Banjul Music Group	
June 26	Alewya	Zero			
June 26	American Aquarium	New Ways to Lose		Losing Side Records, Thirty Tigers	
June 26	Amberian Dawn	Temptation's Gates		Napalm	
June 26	Au/Ra	Heartcore		Polydor	
June 26	Beth Orton	The Ground Above		Partisan	
June 26	The Bouncing Souls	Born to Be			
June 26	Brutalismus 3000	Harmony		Live from Earth, Columbia	
June 26	Butthole Surfers	After the Astronaut		Sunset Blvd	
June 26	Cécile McLorin Salvant	With Every Breath I Take	Jazz	Nonesuch	
June 26	Chanel Beads	Your Day Will Come		Jagjaguwar	
June 26	Cody Johnson	Banks of the Trinity			
June 26	Damien Dempsey	Holywell			
June 26	Dan Deacon	Little Brother (Original Sountrack)			
June 26	Dean Brody	The Tenth Album (Side A)		Starseed	
June 26	Debbii Dawson	Where Have All the Good Men Gone?		RCA	
June 26	Downtown Boys	Public Luxury	Punk rock	Sub Pop	
June 26	Exploring Birdsong	Every House We Built		Long Branch	
June 26	Fiddlehead	Baby I'll Change		Run for Cover	
June 26	Georgia Webster	Everything Must Go!			
June 26	Girl Trouble	As Is		K, Wig Out Records	
June 26	Go-Jo	The Go-Jo Variety Show		Chugg Music	
June 26	Gold Panda	Ton Up		Studio Barnhus	
June 26	Hooligan Hefs	Sixth Sense		New Level	
June 26	Ibeyi	Offering			
June 26	Junius	Sotera		Prosthetic	
June 26	Katie Noonan	Alone but All One		Katie Noonan	
June 26	Kita Alexander	Rage		Warner Music Australia	
June 26	Kwn	And All Pride Aside		RCA	
June 26	Madeon	Victory	New rave, electropop	Mom + Pop	
June 26	Masterplan	Metalmorphosis	Power metal	Frontiers	
June 26	Maxo Kream	O.Y.N		Persona Money Global, Empire	
June 26	Mico	When the Lights Turn On		Columbia, Wasted Years	
June 26	Mortiis	Ghosts of Europa		Prophecy	
June 26	Mr. Fantasy	Fantasyland		Mr. Fantasy	
June 26	Muse	The Wow! Signal		Warner	
June 26	Naomi Sharon	No Sleep in Paradise		OVO Sound	
June 26	Nectar Woode	Naturally		RCA, Since 93	
June 26	Pearl and the Oysters	Monkey Mind		Stones Throw	
June 26	The Pretty Reckless	Dear God	Hard rock	Fearless	
June 26	Las Robertas	All We Need Is Now		Kanine	
June 26	Rodney Crowell	Then Again		New West	
June 26	Ryan Beatty	Sweet Fortune		Atlantic	
June 26	Sekou	In a World We Don't Belong Pt. 2			
June 26	Siamese	Dissolution		Long Branch Records	
June 26	Sincere Engineer	Probable Claws		Hopeless	
June 26	Some Velvet Sidewalk	Critters Encore		K	
June 26	Stephan Moccio	Scenes from a Velvet Room		Decca	
June 26	Switchfoot	Forever Now		BMG	
June 26	Tasha	You Are Spring		Bayonet Records	
June 26	Temples	Bliss		V2	
June 26	T.I.	Kill the King		Grand Hustle, Empire	
June 26	Tift Merritt	Sugar		One Riot	
June 26	Willow Avalon	Pink Pocket Pistol		Atlantic Outpost, Assemble Sound	
June 26	Yoasobi	The Book For,		Echoes, Sony Japan	
June 26	YoungBoy Never Broke Again	More Leaks 2		Never Broke Again, Motown	
