= List of 2026 albums =

For lists of 2026 albums, see:

- List of 2026 albums (January–June)
- List of 2026 albums (July–December)
