= Sluice (disambiguation) =

A sluice is a water channel containing a sluice gate (a type of lock to manage the water flow and water level).

== Places ==
- Sluice, Pakistan, a village in the Punjab, Pakistan
- Sluice Art Fair, a London-based biennial contemporary art fair
- Sluice Creek, a tributary of Dennis Creek in Cape May County, New Jersey, US
- Sluice Boxes State Park, a public recreation area in the Little Belt Mountains of Montana, US
- Sluice Point, Nova Scotia, a community in Nova Scotia, Canada

== Other uses ==
- Sluicing, a linguistic phenomenon
- Sluice box, a device used in placer mining
- Sluice (musician), stage name of American indie rock musician Justin Edward Morris

== See also ==
- Sluis – municipality in Zeeland, the Netherlands
