= Hex Dealer =

Studio album by Lip Critic
- Released: May 17, 2024
- Genre: Digital hardcore; electro-punk
- Length: 31:51
- Language: English
- Label: Partisan, Universal Music

Lip Critic chronology
Lip Critic II (2020)	Hex Dealer (2024)	Theft World (2026)

Singles from Hex Dealer
- 1. "It's The Magic" Released: October 24, 2023; 2. "The Heart" Released: January 16, 2024; 3. "Milky Max" Released: February 21, 2024; 4. "In The Wawa (Convinced I Am God)" Released: April 2, 2024

Hex Dealer is the debut full-length studio album by American electro-punk band Lip Critic. It was received positively by critics.

== Reception ==
According to the review aggregator Metacritic, Hex Dealer received "universal acclaim" based on a weighted average score of 84 out of 100 from 5 critic scores. Anna Zanes interviewed Lip Critic in Alternative Press and characterized the release as "replete with their trademark manic energy and irreverent ethos" that results in a "dizzying rush that rides on snarky punk spirit, and takes us through 12 dopamine-inducing tracks". Julia Mason of Clash Music scored the album an 8 out of 10, writing that "Lip Critic have produced an album loaded with imagination and creativity". Jack Butler-Terry of DIY rated it 3.5 out of 5 stars, writing that it justified the hype the band has received and it "establishes Lip Critic as ones to watch". Anagricel Duran of NME scored Hex Dealer 5 out of 5 stars, characterizing it as a "wildly imaginative debut" with songs that are both "freewheeling and fun" and "thrillingly dark". Grace Robins-Somerville of Paste rated it a 7.9 out of 10 that combines trenchant critiques of capitalism with being "a silly, goofy album by a silly, goofy band". Paste also published a profile of the band by Matt Mitchell that called the release "one of the freakiest, crunchiest, grossest albums of 2024". Editors at Pitchfork scored it 7.7 out of 10 and critic Jaeden Pinder called it "a master class in genre-hopping, running the gamut of drum’n’bass, hip-hop, and ska" and praised the band's inclusion of comedy in the lyrics.

Staff at Consequence of Sound included it among the best albums of May, with Sun Noor writing that it "amplifies the generational struggle for liberation", and it was ranked 29 on a June 4 list of the best albums of the year so far, where Jonah Krueger called it "aggressive, danceable, and moshable in all the right ways".

== Track listing ==
No.	Title	Length
1.	"It's the Magic"	4:26
2.	"Love Will Redeem You"	2:33
3.	"The Heart"	2:35
4.	"Bork Pelly"	3:00
5.	"Spirit Bomber"	2:35
6.	"Death Lurking"	3:50
7.	"Milky Max"	2:30
8.	"Sermon"	2:17
9.	"I'm Alive"	1:53
10.	"My Wife and the Goblin"	1:41
11.	"In the Wawa (Convinced I Am God)"	2:19
12.	"Toxin Dodger"	2:12

== Personnel ==
Lip Critic

- Danny Eberle – drums
- Bret Kaser – synthesizer, vocals, mixing
- Connor Kleitz – synthesizer, vocals
- Ilan Natter – drums, mixing

Additional personnel

- Izzy Da Fonseca – vocals on "Death Lurking"
- GHÖSH – vocals on "Bork Pelly"
- ID.Sus – vocals on "Bork Pelly"
- Andrew Yanchyshyn – audio mastering

== See also ==
- 2024 in American music
- 2024 in rock music
- List of 2024 albums
