= Spike Field =

Studio album by Maria BC
- Released: October 20, 2023
- Genre: experimental
- Length: 48:33
- Label: Sacred Bones

Maria BC chronology
Hyaline (2022)	Spike Field (2023)	Marathon (2026)

Spike Field is the second studio album by American musician Maria BC. It was released on October 20, 2023, by Sacred Bones Records.

== Background ==
On August 29, 2023, Maria BC announced the release of her second studio album, along with the two singles "Amber" and "Watcher".

== Critical reception ==
Professional ratings
Aggregate scores
Source	Rating
Metacritic	79/100
Review scores
Source	Rating
AllMusic	3/5 stars
Paste	9.1/10
Pitchfork	7.8/10
Sputnikmusic	4/5 stars

Spike Field was met with "generally favorable" reviews from critics. At Metacritic, which assigns a weighted average rating out of 100 to reviews from mainstream publications, this release received an average score of 79, based on 8 reviews.

At Paste, writer Rachel Saywitz gave the album a 9.1 out of 10, calling it "the most hopeful record Maria BC has made." Hannah Jocelyn of Pitchfork wrote: "Spike Field is a lonely record, but it demands close listening for the moments when the light breaks through."

=== Accolades ===
Publications' year-end list appearances for Spike Field
Critic/Publication	List	Rank	Ref
Paste	Paste's Top 50 Albums of 2023	14	
Still Listening	Still Listening's Top 50 Albums of 2023	18	

== Track listing ==
Spike Field track listing
No.	Title	Length
1.	"Amber"	3:53
2.	"Watcher"	3:04
3.	"(A Backlit Door)"	0:51
4.	"Haruspex"	5:19
5.	"Return to Sender"	3:21
6.	"Tire Iron"	3:49
7.	"Daydrinker"	3:58
8.	"Tied"	4:15
9.	"= Still"	5:13
10.	"Lacuna"	4:16
11.	"Mercury"	4:08
12.	"Spike Field"	6:26
