= Marathon (Maria BC album) =

2026 studio album

Studio album by Maria BC
- Released: February 27, 2026
- Recorded: 2024–2025
- Genre: Ambient
- Length: 37:24
- Label: Sacred Bones
- Producer: Maria BC

Maria BC chronology
Spike Field (2023)	Marathon (2026)

Marathon is the third studio album by the American musician Maria BC. It was released on February 27, 2026, through Sacred Bones Records to generally favorable reviews.

== Reception ==
Professional ratings
Aggregate scores
Source	Rating
Metacritic	78/100
Review scores
Source	Rating
AllMusic	3.5/5 stars
Clash	7/10
Mojo	4/5 stars
Paste	B
Pitchfork	7.4/10
The Skinny	4/5 stars

According to the review aggregator Metacritic, Marathon received "generally favorable reviews" based on a weighted average score of 78 out of 100 from 7 critic scores. Writing for The Quietus, Amanda Farah described the album as a "very textural composition," and that Maria BC has "pulled back sharply on the production, and these decisions build a low-simmering, tense mood in a gentle guise."

== Track listing ==
All music is composed by Maria BC; "Port Authority" co-composed by Ruairi O'Brien.

Marathon track listing
No.	Title	Length
1.	"Marathon"	3:01
2.	"As the Earth Turns"	2:55
3.	"Peacemaking"	3:23
4.	"Safety"	2:16
5.	"Rare"	3:21
6.	"Port Authority"	1:18
7.	"The Sound"	3:31
8.	"Sabotage"	4:21
9.	"June"	1:23
10.	"Night & Day"	4:25
11.	"May This Rain"	3:21
12.	"Channels"	1:23
13.	"Miami"	2:49
Total length:		37:27

== Personnel ==
Credits are adapted from the album's liner notes and Tidal.

- Maria BC – acoustic guitar, bass, electric guitar, percussion, piano, synthesizer, zither, production, engineering (all tracks); vocals (tracks 1–5, 7, 8, 10, 11, 13)
- Ruairi O'Brien – mixing (all tracks), percussion (2, 3, 13)
- Greg Obis – mastering
- Cole Pulice – saxophone (10)
- Saber Sutphin – album art
- Mercy Charlotte Reise – layout
