= I Know You're Hurting, Everyone Is Hurting, Everyone Is Trying, You Have Got to Try =

Studio album by Joshua Idehen
- Released: 6 March 2026
- Genres: Electronic; dance; spoken word
- Length: 47:22
- Labels: Heavenly, PIAS
- Producer: Ludvig Parment

Singles from I Know You're Hurting, Everyone Is Hurting, Everyone Is Trying, You Have Got to Try
- 1. "It Always Was" Released: 6 October 2025; 2. "Don't Let It Get You Down" Released: 18 November 2025; 3. "This Is the Place" Released: 22 January 2026

I Know You're Hurting, Everyone Is Hurting, Everyone Is Trying, You Have Got to Try is the debut solo studio album by the British spoken-word artist Joshua Idehen. It was released on 6 March 2026 through Heavenly Recordings under exclusive licence to PIAS. The album was made with Idehen's creative partner Ludvig Parment and follows Idehen's 2024 track "Mum Does the Washing".

The album combines spoken word with electronic, dance, house, gospel, jazz, and club-music elements. Its lyrics address community, masculinity, friendship, personal change, grief, joy, and collective resilience. It was preceded by the singles "It Always Was", "Don't Let It Get You Down", and "This Is the Place". The album received generally favourable reviews from music critics and reached number two on the UK Dance Albums Chart and UK Independent Album Breakers Chart.

== Background ==
Idehen is a British-born, Stockholm-based writer, poet, and performer. Before the album, he had worked in London's poetry scene for nearly two decades and had collaborated with projects including Benin City, Sons of Kemet, and The Comet Is Coming. The album was Idehen's debut for the Heavenly Recordings, and was made with Ludvig Parment, who had also worked with Idehen on "Mum Does the Washing".

The Guardian profiled Idehen in October 2025 before the album's release. In the interview, Idehen discussed being born in London, growing up partly in Nigeria, returning to the United Kingdom as a young adult, and later living in Stockholm with his daughter. The same profile described his forthcoming album as an optimistic record built from soul samples and house beats, and stated that it would be released in March 2026 on Heavenly Recordings.

== Music and lyrics ==
Critics described I Know You're Hurting, Everyone Is Hurting, Everyone Is Trying, You Have Got to Try as a record that places spoken-word writing within club and electronic arrangements. Pitchfork listed the album's genre as electronic, writing that it uses club music to address gender equality, personal transformation, and communal uplift. Jesse Dorris wrote in Pitchfork that Parment's production ranges from gospel and jazz to UK garage and filter house, and discussed "Turn It Around", "It Always Was", "This Is the Place", "Brother", and "Whatever Comes" as examples of the album's interest in transformation, masculinity, and dance music.

Rob Hakimian of Beats Per Minute described the album as a dancefloor-focused record with soul-sample-backed house songs, personal storytelling, and a positive tone. He wrote that "Mum Does the Washing" sits at the album's centre, while "My Love", "Brother", "Everything Everywhere All at Once", and "Turn It Around" show the album's changes in tempo and emotional focus. John Bradbury of the 13th Floor described the record as a fusion of spoken word and electronic textures, writing that Parment's production uses bass, percussion, synthesisers, and gradual variation around Idehen's voice. Finlay Harrison of Clash called the album a dance-influenced spoken-word record and wrote that Parment's sampled grooves and production helped make Idehen's emotional writing suitable for club settings. Joe Muggs of The Arts Desk described the album as moving across piano rave, UK garage, and euphoric techno while retaining Idehen's background in spoken-word performance.

== Release and promotion ==
Idehen announced I Know You're Hurting, Everyone Is Hurting, Everyone Is Trying, You Have Got to Try on 6 October 2025, alongside "It Always Was", as the first single from the album. "Don't Let It Get You Down" followed on 18 November 2025 as the next single from the album. A third single, "This Is the Place", was released on 22 January 2026.

The album was released on 6 March 2026. Heavenly announced UK and European touring around the album cycle, including spring 2026 headline dates and support dates with Baxter Dury. On the Official Charts Company specialist charts, the album reached number 2 on the UK Dance Albums Chart and UK Independent Album Breakers Chart, number 7 on the UK Independent Albums Chart, number 10 on the UK Record Store Chart, and number 19 on the Scottish Albums Chart.

== Critical reception ==
Professional ratings
Aggregate scores
Source	Rating
Metacritic	79/100
Review scores
Source	Rating
The Arts Desk	4/5 stars
Beats per Minute	80%
Clash	8/10
The Wee Review	5/5 stars

I Know You're Hurting, Everyone Is Hurting, Everyone Is Trying, You Have Got to Try received positive reviews from critics, who praised the album's optimism, dance-music setting, and use of spoken-word performance. At Metacritic, which assigns a normalized rating out of 100 to reviews from mainstream critics, the album received a score of 79 based on four critic reviews, indicating "generally favorable" reception.

Dorris wrote in Pitchfork that the album is earnest and sometimes sentimental, but highlighted its connection between club music, masculinity, friendship, and personal change. Hakimian gave the album a score of 80% for Beats Per Minute, writing that its emotional storytelling and dancefloor focus made its affirmative tone effective despite occasional excess. Harrison gave the album 8 out of 10 in Clash, describing it as a raw and joyful record whose church and rave associations suited Idehen's performance style. Muggs gave the album four stars in the Arts Desk, praising its mixture of rave-related styles and spoken-word directness while identifying "Mum Does the Washing" and "Choose Yourself" as weaker tracks. Lorna Irvine of the Wee Review gave the album five stars, describing it as a bold and humorous record that combines existential subject matter with dance-oriented arrangements.

Bradbury wrote for The 13th Floor that the album is an immersive spoken-word and electronic record about community and endurance. He singled out "Mum Does the Washing" as central to the album and described the final stretch, including "Everything Everywhere All at Once", "Turn It Around", and "What Is Redemption", as moving toward a quieter but unresolved sense of resolution. In the Observer's albums-of-the-week column, the album was discussed in relation to the earlier success of "Mum Does the Washing" and to songs about personal flaws, friendship, and emotional support, including "My Love", "Brother", and "Whatever Comes".

== Track listing ==
Track titles and lengths are adapted from Apple Music.

I Know You're Hurting, Everyone Is Hurting, Everyone Is Trying, You Have Got to Try track listing
No.	Title	Length
1.	"You Wanna Dance Or What?" (featuring Tommy McGee)	3:00
2.	"Interlude - It Won't Always Be Like This"	0:16
3.	"It Always Was"	2:32
4.	"This Is the Place"	3:16
5.	"Interlude - What You Need to Hear" (featuring Charlotte Manning)	1:44
6.	"Could Be Forever"	3:01
7.	"Mum Does the Washing"	3:52
8.	"Don't Let It Get You Down"	2:59
9.	"My Love" (featuring Amanda Bergman)	3:36
10.	"Interlude - How I Found Forgiveness"	1:27
11.	"Brother"	3:29
12.	"Whatever Comes"	3:35
13.	"Choose Yourself"	2:40
14.	"Everything Everywhere All at Once"	3:38
15.	"Everything Everywhere All at Once Reprise"	1:47
16.	"Turn It Around"	3:25
17.	"What Is Redemption"	2:55

== Charts ==
Chart performance for I Know You're Hurting, Everyone Is Hurting, Everyone Is Trying, You Have Got to Try
Chart (2026)	Peak position
Scottish Albums (Official Charts)	19
UK Albums Sales (OCC)	17
UK Album Downloads (Official Charts)	15
UK Physical Albums (OCC)	19
UK Vinyl Albums (OCC)	21
UK Record Store (OCC)	10
UK Dance Albums (Official Charts)	2
UK Independent Albums (Official Charts)	7
UK Independent Album Breakers (OCC)	2

== Personnel ==
Credits are adapted from Bandcamp, Apple Music and Heavenly Recordings.

- Joshua Idehen - vocals, spoken word
- Ludvig Parment - production
- Amanda Bergman - vocals on "My Love"
- Charlotte Manning - writing contribution, featured appearance on "Interlude - What You Need to Hear"
- Leone Ross - writing contribution
- Tommy McGee - featured appearance on "You Wanna Dance Or What?"
- Pete Fraser - saxophone
- Shabaka Hutchings - flute
