= Craven Faults =

British electronic musician

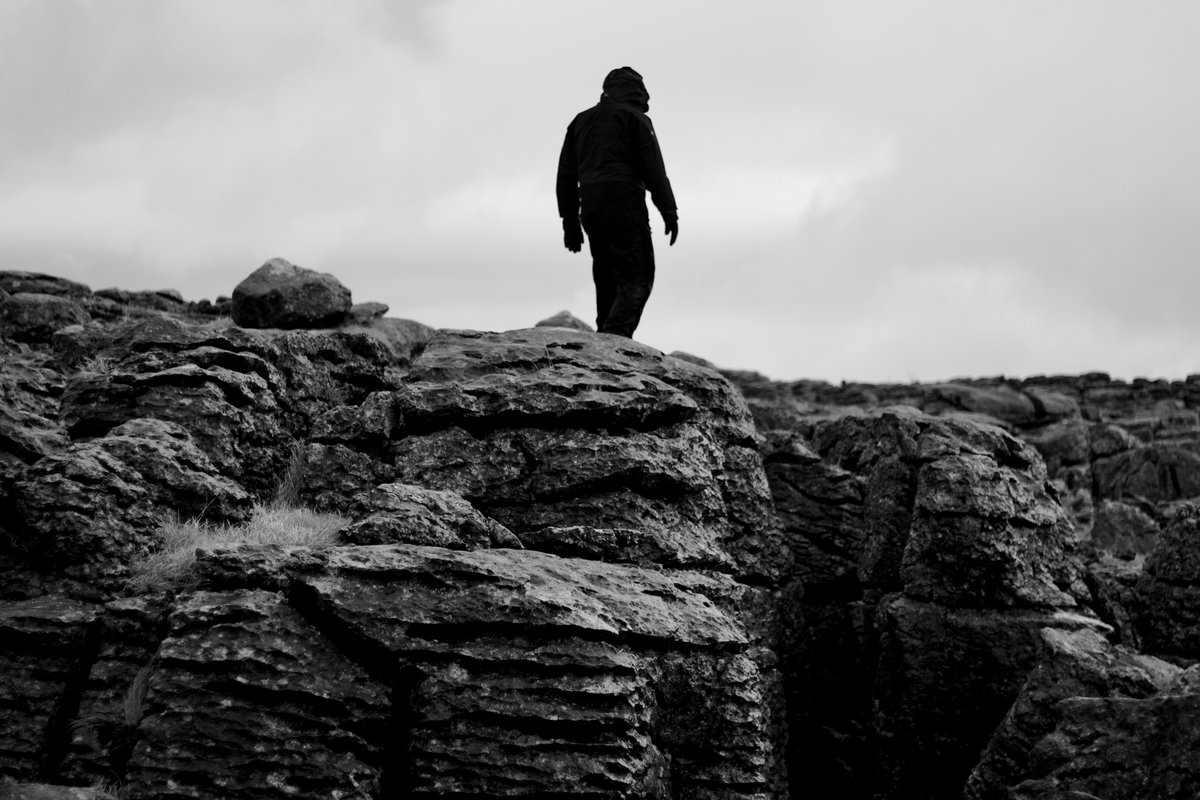
- Craven Faults profile image from Bandcamp

Background information
- Genres: Ambient music, Krautrock, Electronic,
- Instruments: Synthesizer, keyboard, Field recording
- Years active: 2017 - present

Craven Faults is a British electronic artist and producer known for combining analogue synthesizers, electronics and field recordings to create music that draws from ambient music, Krautrock and electronica. The name is taken from the Craven Fault System in the Pennines and much of his music draws inspiration from the landscapes of Yorkshire, where he resides.

== Career ==
Little is known about the enigmatic Craven Faults. He emerged with the release of Netherfield Works on the Lowfold Works label in 2017, followed by Springhead Works and Nunroyd Works in 2019. The pieces on these EPs range from seven to seventeen minutes in length and establish a signature sound of long-form, often hypnotic instrumental works. Later in 2019 he released Lowfold Works Trilogy (a collections of these three EPs) and Lowfold Reworks, made up of three remixes of tracks from these EPs. Lowfold Works Trilogy was later released as a vinyl box set in 2022.

In January 2020 Craven Faults released his debut album Erratics & Unconformities, beginning a relationship with Yorkshire-based label The Leaf Label. The Line of Best Fit called the album a "tour-de-force". Live Works was released in September 2020. The first three tracks were released digitally in 2020, and followed up with a limited 4 track vinyl release in 2022. In May 2023 Craven Faults released his second full-length album Standers, also on The Leaf Label, which Loud and Quiet heralded as a "hypnotic, idiosyncratic gem".

In September 2023 Craven Faults made his live debut with four sold-out performances at Thwaite Watermill in Leeds, West Yorkshire. On 1 May 2023, twelve days before the release of Standers, Craven Faults made a 75-minute broadcast on YouTube, featuring live footage of a field of sheep and a new, improvised piece of music. The track was subsequently titled ‘May Birching’ and added as a bonus track to the Standers release on Bandcamp. An edition of 100 cassettes of the track was made available at the Thwaite Watermill shows.

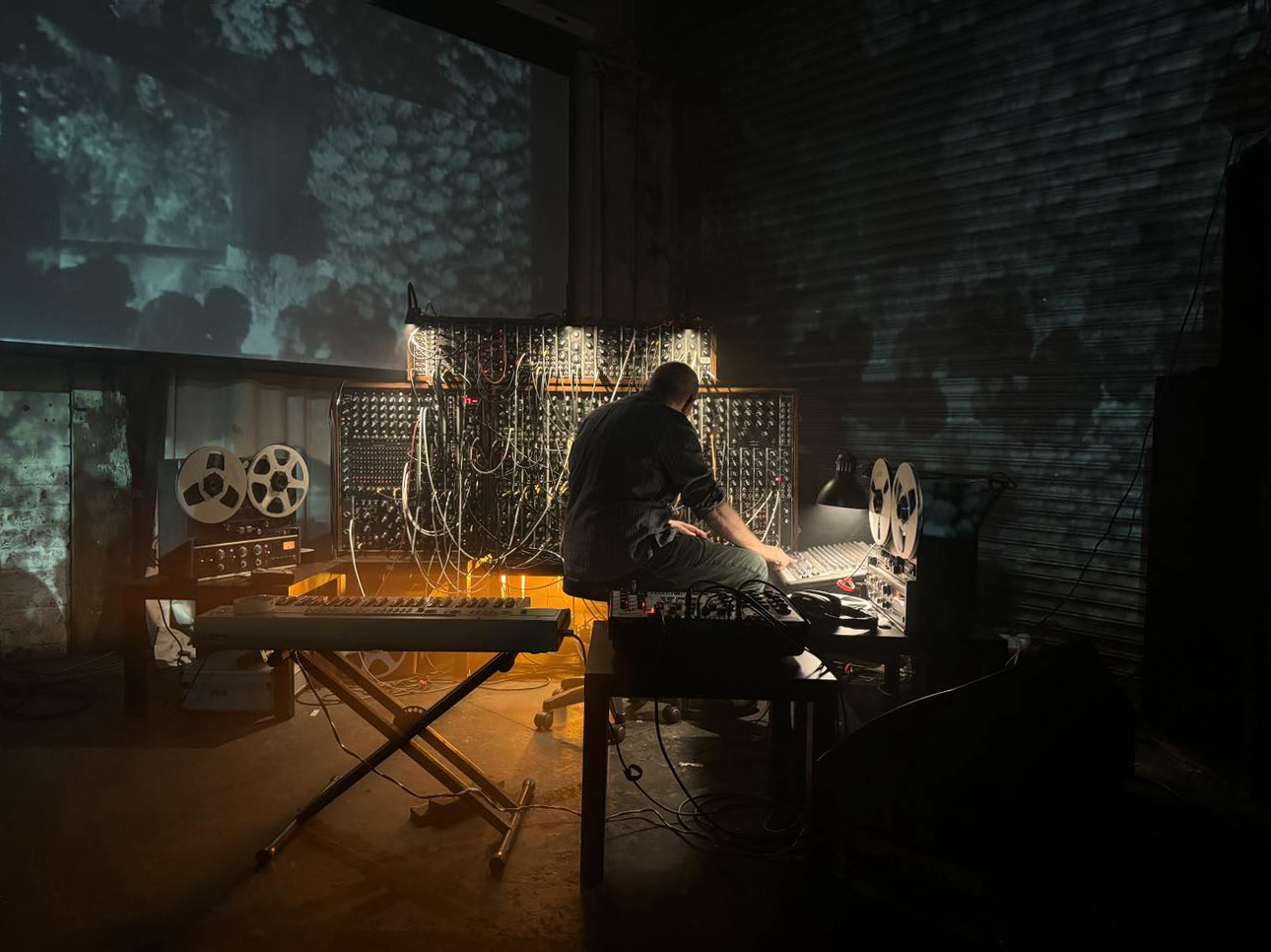
Craven Faults live performance at The White Hotel Salford, on 8 November 2024

In February 2024, Craven Faults played a live show at Studio 9294 in London.

In October 2024 Craven Faults released Bounds. Following loosely in the footsteps of 2020's Enclosures, it's another 37-minute journey through Northern England via a lifetime obsessing at the fringes of popular culture. Bounds was made available in five vinyl editions: four limited edition colored vinyl and one unlimited edition black vinyl.

In November 2024, Craven Faults played live shows at The Cube in Bristol and The White Hotel in Salford.

In March 2025, he played two shows at the Rymer Auditorium at the University of York in the UK.

== Discography ==
=== Albums ===
- Erratics & Unconformities (2020, The Leaf Label)
- Live Works (2020, Lowfold Works)
- Standers (2023, The Leaf Label)
- May Birching (2023, Lowfold Works)
- Sidings (2026, The Leaf Label)

=== Mini albums ===
- Enclosures (2020, The Leaf Label)
- Bounds (2024, The Leaf Label)

=== EPs ===
- Netherfield Works (2017, Lowfold Works)
- Springhead Works (2019, Lowfold Works)
- Nunroyd Works (2019, Lowfold Works)
- Lowfold Reworks (2019, Lowfold Works)
