= Every Single Muscle =

Studio album by the Bug Club
- Released: 29 May 2026
- Studios: Rat Trap Studios, Cardiff
- Genre: Garage punk
- Length: 41:10
- Label: Sub Pop
- Producer: Tom Rees

The Bug Club chronology
Very Human Features (2025)	Every Single Muscle (2026)

Singles from Every Single Muscle
- 1. "Watching the Omnibus" Released: 18 February 2026; 2. "Yours (If You Want Me)" Released: 25 March 2026; 3. "A Good Day for Dying" Released: 29 April 2026

Every Single Muscle is a studio album by the Welsh indie rock band the Bug Club. It was released on 29 May 2026 through Sub Pop. The album was produced and mixed by Tom Rees at Rat Trap Studios in Cardiff and mastered by Mikey Young. It reached number 24 on the Official Independent Albums Chart and number 11 on the Official Independent Album Breakers Chart in the United Kingdom.

The album was announced in February 2026 with the single "Watching the Omnibus", followed by "Yours (If You Want Me)" in March and "A Good Day for Dying" in April. Every Single Muscle received generally positive reviews from critics, who described it as a short-song rock album with garage-punk foundations and mid-album turns toward twee pop and post-punk, with lyrics repeatedly concerned with bodies and self-consciousness.

== Background and release ==
The Bug Club signed to Sub Pop before releasing On the Intricate Inner Workings of the System in 2024, followed by Very Human Features in 2025.

On 18 February 2026, the band announced Every Single Muscle and released "Watching the Omnibus" as its lead single. "Yours (If You Want Me)" followed on 25 March. On 29 April, Sub Pop released "A Good Day for Dying" as another single from the album. The album was released on 29 May 2026 on CD, LP, and digital services. Sub Pop listed a limited Loser Edition vinyl pressing in opaque blue in North America and blue vinyl in the United Kingdom and European Union. Ross Willmett illustrated the cover art.

== Music and lyrics ==
Every Single Muscle contains 18 tracks and has a running time of 41 minutes and 10 seconds. Sub Pop described the record as an album of garage-punk songs and wrote that many tracks run under two minutes. Billie Estrine of the Skinny wrote that the album emphasizes a more punk-directed form of the band's guitar music, while Pitchfork's Alex Robert Ross described its middle section as built from short bursts of twee pop and post-punk.

Ross wrote that the album is not presented as a concept album, but that its focus on the human body recurs through the songs and artwork. Sub Pop's album description similarly framed the record around the human form and a detached, comic view of being a person. Estrine wrote that Sam Willmett and Tilly Harris's lyrics remain direct even as the band's tempos and guitar parts become more unsettled.

Jiffy Marx of Scene Point Blank compared the album's rock style to Guided by Voices and a less psychedelic version of the Velvet Underground, and singled out the contrast between Willmett and Harris's vocals as a central part of the band's sound. Stereogum's Chris DeVille described "Yours (If You Want Me)" as a harmonised rock song that followed the album's February lead single.

== Critical reception ==
Professional ratings
Review scores
Source	Rating
Pitchfork	7.2/10
The Skinny	4/5 stars
Spectrum Culture	3.5/5 stars

Estrine gave Every Single Muscle four stars out of five in the Skinny, writing that the band's lyrical directness remained present in its quicker and more abrasive songs. In Treble, Elliot Burr described the album as a body-themed set of garage rock songs and highlighted the band's rapid pacing and dense hooks.

Writing for Pitchfork, Ross focused on the album's body imagery and wrote that the band's direct lyrical approach was partly a misdirection from underlying themes of vulnerability, loneliness, and mortality. Ross identified "Yours (If You Want Me)" as the album's standout track, describing it as a duet that gives the record an emotional point of connection after its more awkward and comic material.

== Track listing ==
All lyrics are written by Sam Willmett; all music is composed by Sam Willmett and Tilly Harris.

Every Single Muscle track listing
No.	Title	Length
1.	"Miss Wales 2012"	1:29
2.	"A Good Day for Dying"	3:03
3.	"Make It Count"	2:44
4.	"Cut to Black"	1:30
5.	"Full Range of Motion"	1:32
6.	"Pretty as a Magazine"	2:18
7.	"Look Like Me"	2:26
8.	"How Can We Be Friends"	1:35
9.	"Every Single Muscle"	1:59
10.	"Shiny and Wet"	4:08
11.	"Semi-Automatic"	1:53
12.	"In My Short Life"	1:40
13.	"Watching the Omnibus"	1:19
14.	"It's Our Manager David"	2:12
15.	"Yours (If You Want Me)"	2:27
16.	"All My Clothes Fell Off"	2:42
17.	"Third Best Friend"	3:36
18.	"My Uncle Warren Drives a Passat"	2:37
Total length:		41:10

== Personnel ==
Credits are adapted from Tidal.

=== The Bug Club ===
- Sam Willmett – guitar, vocals, arrangement
- Tilly Harris – bass guitar, vocals, arrangement

=== Additional contributors ===
- Tom Rees – drums, production, engineering, mixing
- Mikey Young – mastering
- Ross Willmett – artwork

== Charts ==
Chart positions are from Official Charts.

Chart performance for Every Single Muscle
Chart	Peak position
Scottish Albums (OCC)	97
UK Album Sales (OCC)	76
UK Album Downloads (OCC)	63
UK Physical Albums (OCC)	82
UK Independent Albums (OCC)	24
UK Independent Album Breakers (OCC)	11
