= The Bug Club =

Welsh indie rock band

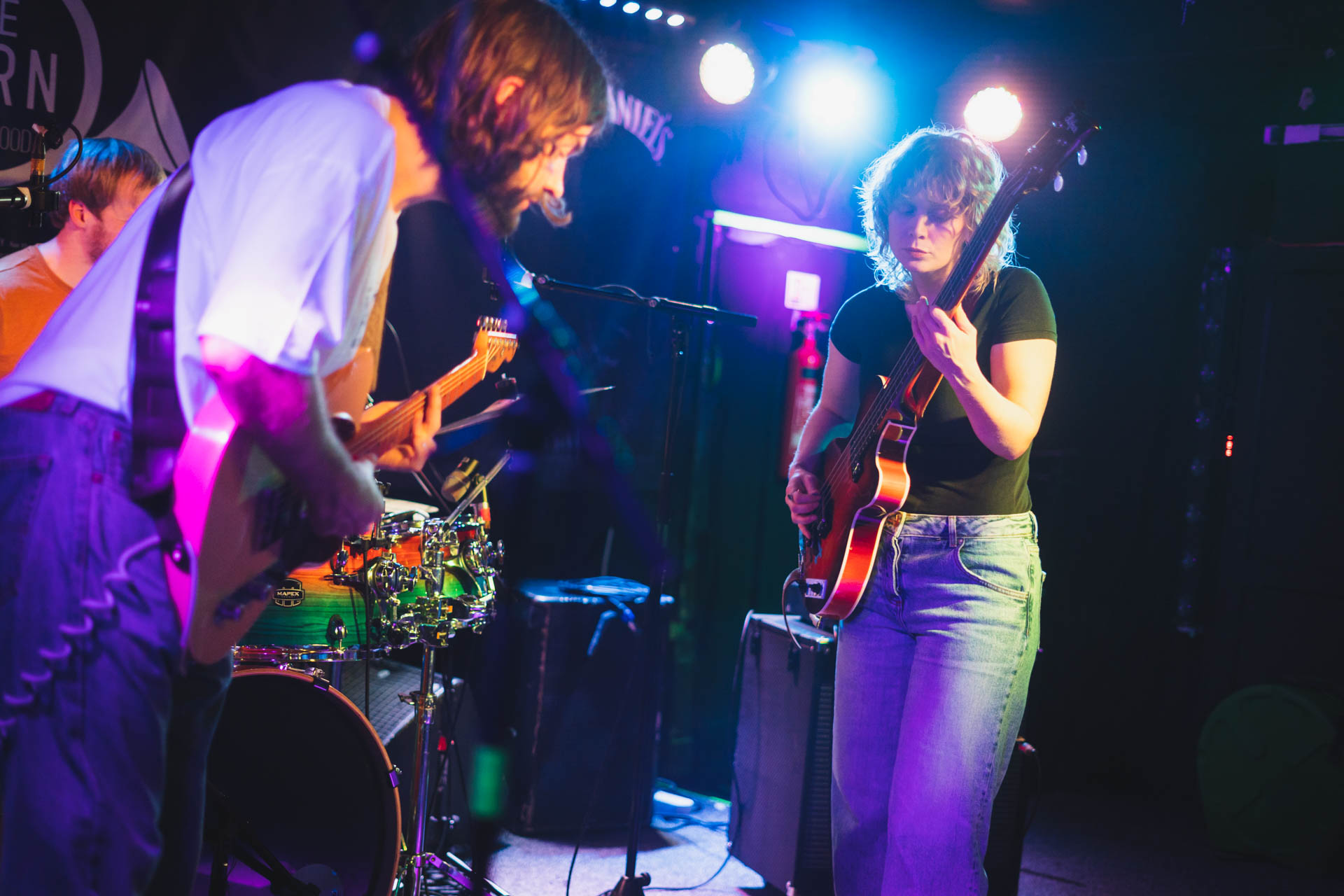
- The Bug Club at The Horn in St Albans in 2022

Background information
- Origin: Caldicot, Monmouthshire, Wales
- Genres: Indie rock; indie pop
- Years active: 2016-present
- Labels: Bingo Records; We Are Busy Bodies; Sub Pop
- Members: Sam Willmett; Tilly Harris
- Past members: Ross Willmett; Ed Hayes; Dan Matthew
- Website: thebugclub.bandcamp.com

The Bug Club is a Welsh indie rock band from Caldicot, Monmouthshire, Great Britain. Formed in 2016, the current lineup consists of Sam Willmett (guitar, vocals) and Tilly Harris (bass, vocals). Initially playing blues music, the band now has a contemporary indie rock sound and is signed to Sub Pop.

== History ==
Sam Willmett and Tilly Harris met in school when they were 14 and quickly started playing music together. The band officially formed in 2016 while they were in university when they were joined by Sam's brother, Ross. The name originates from Ross' childhood group of friends who collected bugs, which the band considered funny and named themselves after. Initially playing blues music written by Ross, the band mostly performed small gigs in Wales, including supporting Status Quo at a gig in Caldicot Castle. Early on, the band were joined by Ed Hayes on bass guitar and Dan Matthew on drums.

The Bug Club self-released two self-titled EPs, one with the full lineup. The lyrics and visuals for the EPs were done by Ross Willmett. After the release of the EPs, the lineup changed, with only Sam Willmett, Tilly Harris and Dan Matthew remaining. They continued to play blues-style music at minor gigs in the Cardiff college scene for the remainder of the decade, gradually turning towards an indie rock style.

They released their debut single, "We Don't Need Room For Loving", in April 2021, followed by the EP Launching Moondream One later that month. Both on Sheffield-based record label Bingo Records. Another single, "Checkmate", was also released to promote the EP. The cover art for the EP, singles, as well as every release since then was done by Ben Hall of Mr Ben & the Bens, as was the production done by Tom Rees of Buzzard Buzzard Buzzard.

The band released their second EP on Bingo Records, Pure Particles, on the 12th of November, 2021, supported by singles "The Fixer" and "My Baby Loves Rock & Roll Music".

The band started out 2022 by releasing the Intelectuals EP and touring the UK, as well as performing in Madrid. After releasing a double single titled Two Beauties, the band announced their debut album, Green Dream In F#, promoted by another UK tour and two singles, "It's Art" and "Love is a Painting", both of which were their most successful releases to date with consistent radio play and hundreds of thousands of online listens. The album was released on October 14, 2022, to critical acclaim. Around the time of Green Dream's promotion, the band signed to We Are Busy Bodies for their North American releases.

Towards the end of the year, the band made their international debut in the Netherlands following radio interviews and performances returning multiple times to perform in cities such as Utrecht and Amsterdam.

In January and February 2023, The Bug Club performed a series of shows under the pseudonym Mr Anyway's Holey Spirits. The shows were recorded and released as a live album titled Mr Anyway's Holey Spirits Perform! One Foot in Bethlehem, featuring entirely new music intended to never be played again. The band continued to perform under their normal name, playing numerous shows in the UK.

Following the release of a picture disc aptly titled Picture This! in April 2023, their second studio album Rare Birds: Hour Of Song was released on October 20, 2023, and was more experimental than their previous work, with spoken word interludes, more diverse genres and new instrumentation. It is also their longest work to date, being slightly longer than an hour.

On March 7, 2024, the band announced that their longtime drummer, Dan Matthew, was leaving the band to focus on his family life.

After signing to US label Sub Pop the band announced that their third album, On The Intricate Inner Workings Of The System…, would be released on 30 August. It was again recorded with Buzzard Buzzard Buzzard's Tom Rees at his Rat Trap studio in Cardiff.

Following the release of their single "Have You Ever Been To Wales" in February 2025, the band's next album, Very Human Features was announced to be released in June 2025.

On February 10, 2026, the band announced their seventh studio album Every Single Muscle would be released in May. The announcement coincided with the release of the album's lead single "Watching the Omnibus", followed by the release of another single, "Yours (If You Want Me)", the next month.

== Discography ==
=== Studio albums ===
- Green Dream In F# (2022)
- Rare Birds: Hour Of Song (2023)
- On the Intricate Inner Workings of the System (2024)
- Very Human Features (2025)
- Every Single Muscle (2026)

=== Extended plays ===
- Launching Moondream One (2021)
- Pure Particles (2021)
- Intelectuals (2022)

=== Live albums ===
- Mr Anyway's Holey Spirits Perform! One Foot In Bethlehem (2023)

=== Singles ===
- Quality Pints (2024)
- Lonsdale Slipons (2024)
- A Bit Like James Bond (2024)
- How to Be a Confidante (2025)
- Appropriate Emotions (2025)
- Have U Ever Been 2 Wales (2025)
