= Maria BC =

American ambient musician

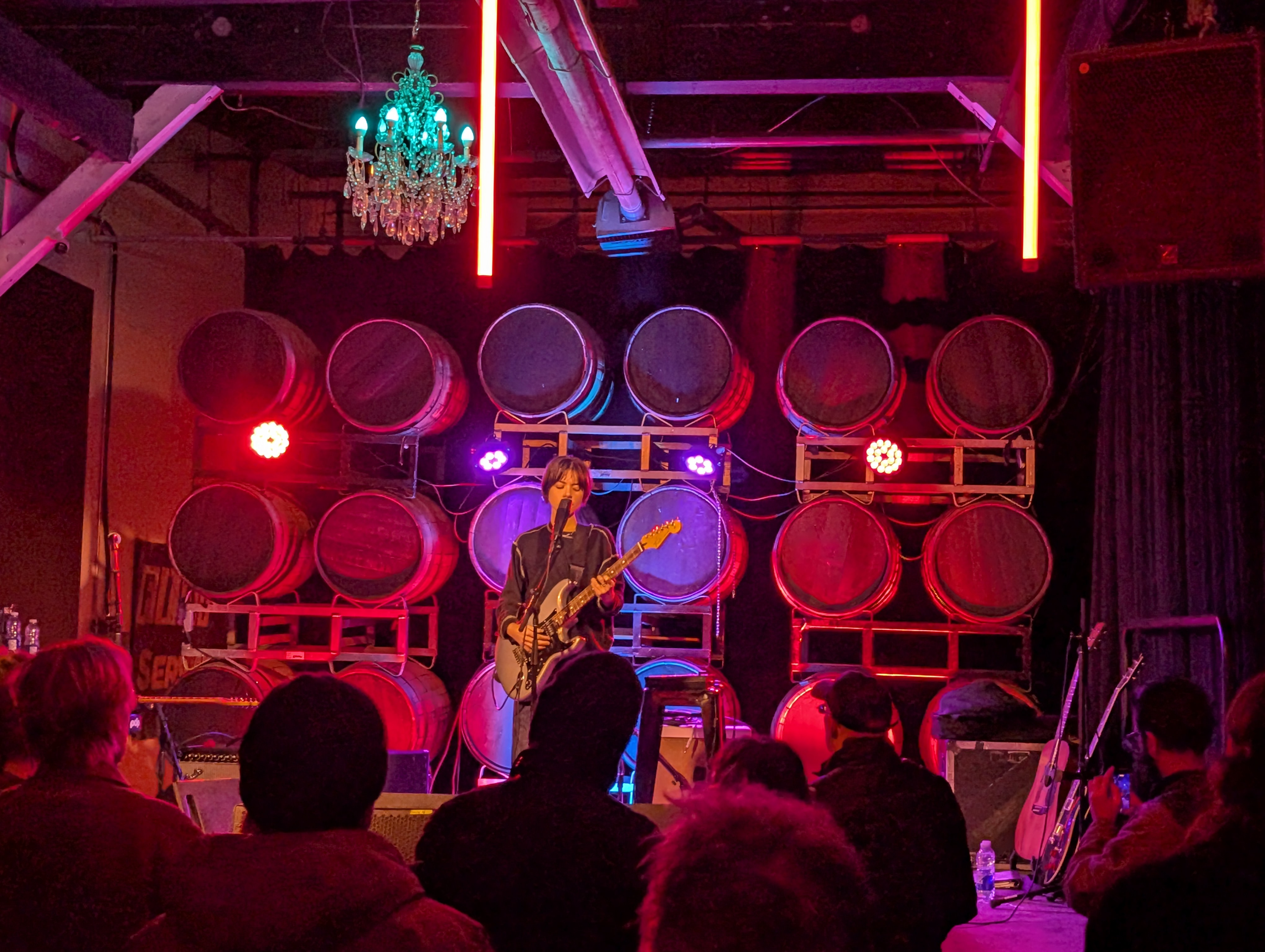

Background information
- Genres: Ambient; folk
- Years active: 2020–present
- Label: Sacred Bones
- Website: mariabc.bandcamp.com

Maria BC is an American ambient musician and singer who is currently based in Oakland, California.

== History ==
Maria BC was trained growing up as a mezzo-soprano. Their father was a musician in the local church. They released their debut EP, Devil's Rain, in 2021. The title track received praise from Pitchfork. They announced their debut album, Hyaline, in early 2022. The album was released on May 27 of that year through Father/Daughter Records. The album was named one of Pitchfork's "7 New Albums You Should Listen to Now" upon release., as well as "Album of the Week" from Stereogum. Following the release of this album, They released a remix album, Hyaline Remixes, in November 2022.

In 2023, Maria BC announced that they had signed to Sacred Bones Records. In addition to the signing, they announced their second full-length album, titled Spike Field. Two songs were released alongside the album announcement, "Amber" and "Watcher".

In addition to their solo music, Maria BC has also collaborated with Rachika Nayar, featuring on two tracks from her debut album, as well as performing in the artist's touring band. Their third album, Marathon, released on February 27, 2026.

== Discography ==
=== Albums ===
Year	Title	Record Label
2022	Hyaline	Father/Daughter Records
2023	Spike Field	Sacred Bones Records
2026	Marathon	Sacred Bones Records

=== EPs ===
- Devil's Rain (Fear of Missing Out, 2022)
- Hyaline Remixes (Father/Daughter Records, 2022)
