= Lip Critic =

American band

- Origin: Brooklyn, New York, United States
- Genres: Post-punk; Electropunk; Post-Industrial; Digital hardcore
- Years active: 2018–present
- Labels: Cruel Nature; Partisan
- Spinoffs: MKULTRA
- Members: Danny Eberle; Bret Kaser; Connor Kleitz; Michael Sandvig
- Past members: Ilan Natter
- Website: www.lipcritic.com

Lip Critic is an electropunk band from Brooklyn, New York. They are currently signed to Partisan Records.

The band utilises two drummers, alongside samplers and vocals.

The band started playing together in 2018. They chose the name "Lip Critic" as it sounded like "Dada-esque nonsense". They released two EPs - 2019's Kill Lip Critic and 2020's Lip Critic II.

In 2024 they released their debut album Hex Dealer to critical acclaim.

The band started work on a follow-up, but this was scrapped after their interactions with a fan who had stolen Bret Kaser's identity, and believed the band was sending him secret messages. They used this as the basis for their second album, Theft World, which was released in 2026. To promote the album, they carried out a series of concerts in non-traditional venues, such as a laundromat, a basement and a boxing ring.

== Band members ==
=== Current members ===
- Bret Kaser – vocals, samplers, occasional live drums (2018-present)
- Connor Klietz – samplers (2018-present)
- Danny Eberle – drums, occasional live vocals (2018-present)
- Michael Sandvig – drums (2024-present)

=== Past members ===
- Ilan Natter – drums (2018-2024)

== Discography ==
=== Albums ===
- Hex Dealer (2024)
- Theft World (2026)

=== EPs ===
- Kill Lip Critic (2019)
- Lip Critic II (2020)
- Lip Critic: Truth Revealed (2021)
