= Truthpaste =

English rock band

- Origin: Manchester, England
- Genres: Art rock; Indie folk; Indie rock
- Years active: 2024–present
- Labels: Dirty Hit; Memorials of Distinction
- Members: Esmé Lark; Theo Murchie; Claire Sun; Euan McNeill; James Ballarò
- Website: truthpaste.band

Truthpaste is an English rock band formed Manchester and now based in London. The band is composed of vocalist and saxophonist Esmé Lark; bassist, guitarist, and vocalist Euan McNeill; guitarist and vocalist Theo Murchie; violinist and vocalist Claire Sun; and guitarist, synth, and lapsteel player James Ballarò. Their sound has been described as a mixture of folk, pop, and electronic music.

== History ==
The band met whilst they were all at university in Manchester. Before the band was formed, Murchie was in a band called Rattletooth—who who recorded an album with Nathan Shawyer, the producer of I Don't Know Either—Ballarò and Murchie were in a band called Drivers, Lark was in a band called the Herbs, and Sun was a DJ under the moniker DJ ford fiesta.

In March 2025, the band released their debut single "See You Around", which Steve Lamacq called "one of his favourite releases of the 2025". It was followed by the single "Bleary Eyes", in September 2025. In April 2026, they release their debut EP I Don't Know Either, which had singles "Bus Song" and "Friendship Is The Truth".
