= Theft World =

2026 studio album by Lip Critic

Studio album by Lip Critic
- Released: May 1, 2026
- Genres: Digital hardcore; electro-punk
- Length: 31:16
- Label: Partisan
- Producer: Lip Critic

Lip Critic chronology
Hex Dealer (2024)	Theft World (2026)

Singles from Theft World
- 1. "Legs in a Snare" Released: February 10, 2026; 2. "Jackpot" Released: March 11, 2026; 3. "Talon" Released: April 9, 2026

Theft World is the second studio album by the American electro-punk band Lip Critic. It was released through Partisan Records on May 1, 2026.

== Background ==
While the band was touring in support of their previous album, Hex Dealer, frontman Bret Kaser found out that his identity had been stolen. The thief had used his personal information to make hundreds of purchases, including all of Lip Critic's Bandcamp discography. When they tracked the culprit down, it turned out to be a young fan in a Five Nights at Freddy's hoodie, who believed Lip Critic's music contained hidden codes for an elaborate scavenger hunt. In lieu of legal action, they took the fan to a halal restaurant and recorded him, where he described an elaborate mythology that he believed was contained in Lip Critic's music. He described a variety of characters and liminal spaces that "initially seemed incoherent but gradually became captivating".

Although the band had already been working on material for a new album, it "felt dull compared to the vivid, accidental universe the fan had invented", leading them to scrap what they had and "create the album he believed already existed". "It's an insane situation, but you got make the best of it", said Kaser. "You got to make lemons with lemonade". According to a press release from the band, "Theft World is an ode to the power and pervasiveness of stealing [...] It's about taking something ugly and using it to make something cute. It's about eating an absurd world and falling in love with it as you digest".

== Promotion ==
The album's lead single, "Legs in a Snare", was released on February 10, 2026, accompanied by a music video on their YouTube channel, directed by Colter Fellows. In the video, as described by Neville Hardman from Alternative Press, "Kaser travels around Manhattan's Financial District with a camera fixed to his head, devised by Fellows using Beastgrip, and meets a cast of demented characters". Rob Hakimian from Beats Per Minute called it "a satisfying and sumptuous shapeshifter of a track", while Jonah Kreuger from Consequence described it as "a live wire of a tune", and "another helping of Lip Critic's propulsive, unpredictable electro-punk". John Amen from The Line of Best Fit wrote, "If with Hex Dealer, they kept the engine revved, so to speak, for fear of stalling out, here they trust that well-oiled V8, knowing that its horsepower and reliable components will carry them where they need to go".

== Track listing ==
All lyrics are written by Bret Kaser; all music is composed by Lip Critic.

Theft World track listing
No.	Title	Length
1.	"Two Lucks"	2:50
2.	"Jackpot"	3:17
3.	"Debt Forest"	2:38
4.	"Talon"	3:37
5.	"Charity Dinner"	2:44
6.	"Drumming with Izzy"	1:47
7.	"My Blush (Strength of the Critic)"	2:59
8.	"Shoplifting"	3:02
9.	"Legs in a Snare"	3:14
10.	"Yard Sale (230 Take)"	1:46
11.	"200 Bottles on Eviction"	3:17
Total length:		31:16

== Personnel ==
Credits are adapted from the album's liner notes and Tidal.

=== Lip Critic ===
- Danny Eberle – drums, production, mixing
- Bret Kaser – vocals, sampler, production, mixing, engineering
- Connor Kleitz – sampler, production, mixing (all tracks); vocals (track 7)

=== Additional contributors ===
- Joe Ippolito – engineering (all tracks), guitar (5)
- Heba Kadry – mastering
- Daniel Barback – additional bass (1)
- Isabella Da Fonseca – additional vocals (4, 7, 11), additional drums (6)
