= Hannah Lew (album) =

Studio album by Hannah Lew
- Released: April 10, 2026
- Recorded: 2023–2025
- Studios: The Best House, Oakland, California
- Genre: Synth-pop
- Length: 30:38
- Label: Night School
- Producer: Maryam Qudus

Hannah Lew is the debut solo studio album by the American musician Hannah Lew, released on April 10, 2026, on the Glasgow-based independent label Night School Records. The album was produced and mixed by Maryam Qudus and mastered by Sarah Register.

Hannah Lew received generally favorable reviews from independent music publications, with critics drawing comparisons to early-1980s synth-pop acts including New Order and Fad Gadget.

== Background and recording ==
Hannah Lew is based in the San Francisco Bay Area and had previously released music with Grass Widow and Cold Beat. Hannah Lew is her first solo album.

Lew wrote, recorded, and performed all of the album's songs between 2023 and 2025, working at her home in Richmond, California, and at The Best House in Oakland. Maryam Qudus produced and mixed the record; additional vocals on "Sunday" and "Another Twilight" were recorded by Chris Coady, and Sarah Register handled mastering.

The album was preceded by the lead single "Another Twilight", which Lew announced alongside the album on January 14, 2026. A second single, "Sunday", followed with a video directed by Luciano Talpini Aita, and a third single, "Replica", was previewed by Flood Magazine.

== Critical reception ==
Hannah Lew was reviewed by Bandcamp Daily, AllMusic, BrooklynVegan, and Spectrum Culture. Writing for Bandcamp Daily, Jennifer Kelly compared the album's "strobe-lit tunes" to "end-of-the-Cold-War outfits like New Order and Fad Gadget." Bill Pearis of BrooklynVegan, in his Indie Basement column, called it "what might be her most fully realized album to date." AllMusic's Heather Phares gave the album four out of five stars and described it as "the Cold Beat leader's captivating solo debut." Spectrum Culture was more critical, characterizing the album as veering into "'80s synth pop wallpaper."

The album was also featured on KEXP's "Midnight in a Perfect World" series.

== Track listing ==
All songs written by Hannah Lew.

No.	Title	Length
1.	"Time Wasted"	3:10
2.	"Sunday"	3:39
3.	"Another Twilight"	3:50
4.	"Siloed"	3:15
5.	"Replica"	3:42
6.	"Damaged Melody"	2:33
7.	"Move In Silence"	3:21
8.	"Distance Of The Moon"	3:51
9.	"The Clock"	3:17
Total length:		30:38

== Personnel ==
Credits adapted from the album's liner notes.

- Hannah Lew - vocals, songwriting, performance, recording
- Maryam Qudus - production, mixing, additional synthesizers
- Sarah Register - mastering
- Chris Coady - vocal recording on "Sunday" and "Another Twilight"
- Andrew Kerwin - guitar
- Adam Charles Miller - additional synthesizers
- Mikal Oor - additional synthesizers
- Luciano Talpini Aita - additional synthesizers
- Steven Bryan - backing vocals on "Siloed"
- Christina Files - percussion on "Sunday"
