= Zoh Amba =

American free jazz musician and composer

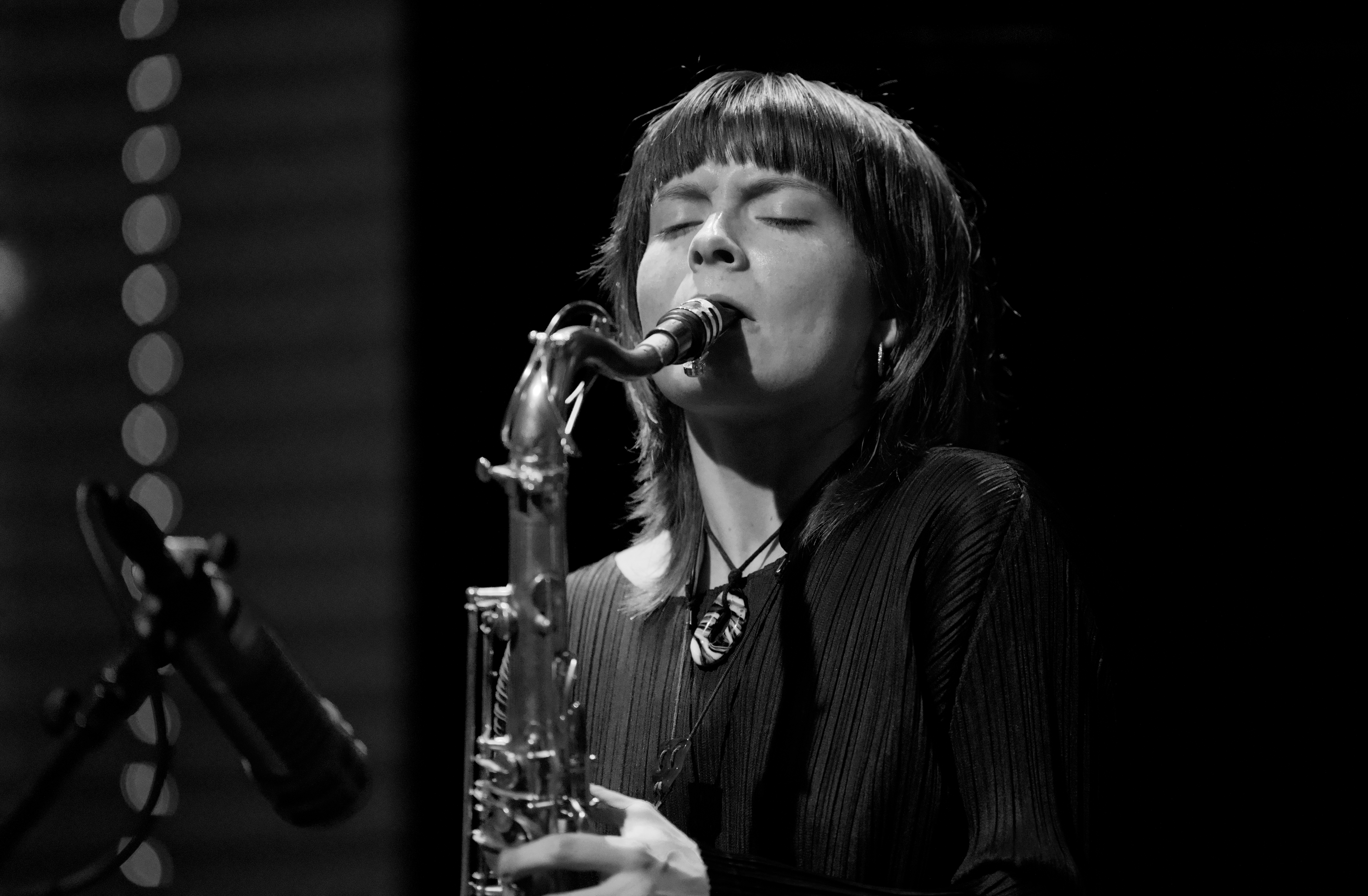
Amba in 2024

Zoh Amba (born Britni Hamrick) is an American free jazz musician and composer from Kingsport, Tennessee. A participant in the avant-garde jazz world often compared to Albert Ayler, they play saxophone, flute, guitar, and piano.

Growing up, they would often play their saxophone in the woods. After dropping out of the San Francisco Conservatory of Music, they studied under David Murray.

John Zorn produced their first record, O, Sun, on Tzadik Records which was released in 2022. Their second album, O Life, O Light Vol. 1, was released in 2024 on 577 Records. In June 2025, Amba's album Sun was released on Smalltown Supersound label. On the 2026 album Eyes Full, released by Matador Records, Amba explores a country-influenced singer-songwriter style.

Spirituality informs their music and they are an Advaita Vedanta practitioner. Amba's name, meaning mother, was given to them during a retreat.
