= Setting (band) =

Instrumental band from North Carolina, United States

- Origin: Durham, North Carolina, United States
- Genres: Experimental
- Years active: 2021–present
- Labels: Thrill Jockey, Paradise of Bachelors
- Members: Nathan Bowles; Jaime Fennelly; Joe Westerlund
- Website: settingsounds.com

Setting is an American instrumental band from Durham, North Carolina.

== History ==
=== Beginnings and Shone a Rainbow Light On (2021-2023) ===
The band was formed in Durham in 2021 by three musicians playing together in the midst of the COVID-19 pandemic. Bandmembers Nathan Bowles, Jaime Fennelly, and Joe Westerlund all play multiple instruments, but Westerlund and Bowles had performed as a percussion duo prior to the formation of the trio.

Shone a Rainbow Light On is the debut studio album by Setting. It was released on September 29, 2023, by Paradise of Bachelors.

Professional ratings
Aggregate scores
Source	Rating
Metacritic	84/100
Review scores
Source	Rating
Pitchfork	7.1/10
Spectrum Culture	78%

Shone a Rainbow Light On was met with positive reviews from critics. At Metacritic, which assigns a weighted average rating out of 100 to reviews from mainstream publications, this release received an average score of 84, based on 6 reviews, which the website categorized as "universal acclaim".

Daniel Hignell of The Quietus wrote of the album: "The sort of record for which the phrase 'organic drones' was built, Setting have produced a beguiling, earthen record that slots neatly into the pantheon of meandering new-age ambiance. A sort of less ostentatious, less cheesy take on Popol Vuh. The album is reminiscent of some of the more obscure instrumental records on the Constellation label, conjuring a world that is neither as minimal as drone nor as lively as kraut-rock, a passive, repetitive, slow-burning folk aesthetic.

=== Recent activity (2024-present) ===
The band's studio album was followed by two album releases of live performances, one from a show at Black Mountain College Museum and one from a performance at the Asheville, North Carolina venue Eulogy.

== Discography ==
- Shone a Rainbow Light On (Paradise of Bachelors, 2023)
- at Black Mountain College Museum (2023)
- at Eulogy (2024)
- at Public Records (2025)
- Setting (Thrill Jockey, 2026)

== Accolades ==
	Critic/Publication	List	Rank	Ref
Uncut	Uncut's Best Albums of 2023 (for Shone a Rainbow Light On)	—		

== Track listing ==
Shone a Rainbow Light On track listing
No.	Title	Length
1.	"We Center"	13:27
2.	"Zoetropics"	7:46
3.	"A Sun Harp"	10:16
4.	"Fog Glossaries"	48:46
Total length:		40:15
