= People I've Met =

American alternative rock band

People I've Met is an American alternative rock band based in New York City. The trio consists of vocalist and guitarist Moses Martin, drummer Orlando Wiltshire, and bassist Andrew Suster. The band released its debut single, "Promise", in December 2025 through Interscope Records, followed by "For Hire" in early 2026.

== History ==
=== Formation and early years ===
The band's origins trace back to the middle-school years of drummer Orlando Wiltshire and bassist Andrew Suster, who performed together in their school's jazz band. During high school, the duo began making music in Wiltshire's garage and later invited vocalist and guitarist Moses Martin to join them. The group initially performed under the name DANCER and began taking their music more seriously toward the end of high school and into college, when they played their first official shows.

=== 2025: Debut single and touring ===
In the summer of 2025, People I've Met supported the Australian band Royel Otis on select dates of their United States tour. Following the tour, the band released its debut single, "Promise", on December 5, 2025, through Interscope Records. The song was produced by the band and Noah Conrad, known for his work with Chappell Roan. An accompanying music video featuring footage of the band in New York City was released simultaneously. The band has also performed a series of shows at the Brooklyn venue Baby's All Right.

=== 2026: "For Hire" ===
In early 2026, the band returned with their second single, "For Hire". The track was released on January 28, 2026, continuing their collaboration with producer Noah Conrad.

== Musical style and influences ==
The band's debut single "Promise" has been described as a mix of unfiltered feeling and elevated songcraft, blending moody, melodic elements with raw intensity. The track incorporates synthesizers, live drums, guitar, and piano. The follow-up single, "For Hire", was noted for its energetic and melodic indie rock sound.

== Members ==
- Moses Martin – lead vocals, guitars, piano
- Andrew Suster – bass guitar, synthesizer, piano, backing vocals
- Orlando Wiltshire – drums, backing vocals

== Discography ==
Singles

• "Promise" (2025)

• "For Hire" (2026)

• "Loving One" (2026)
