= Dirt Buyer III =

Studio album by Dirt Buyer
- Released: February 6, 2026
- Recorded: 2023
- Studio: Studio G
- Genre: Emo; slowcore; folk
- Length: 30:59
- Label: Bayonet
- Producer: Hayden Ticehurst; Chris Cubeta

Dirt Buyer chronology
Dirt Buyer II (2023)	Dirt Buyer III (2026)

Singles from Dirt Buyer III
- 1. "Betchu Won't" Released: October 2, 2025; 2. "Get to Choose" Released: November 18, 2025; 3. "Baseball" Released: December 11, 2025; 4. "Bullshit Fuck" Released: January 14, 2026

Dirt Buyer III is the second studio album by the American musician Joe Sutkowski, under his alias Dirt Buyer, released on February 6, 2026, by Bayonet Records. With no guest appearances, production was handled by Hayden Ticehurst and Chris Cubeta. It was written from 2023 to 2026, after Sutkowski had decided to work on new material following the release of Dirt Buyer II; it was supported by two singles: "Get to Choose", and "Baseball". The album explores themes of isolation and childhood angst.

== Background and recording ==
Following the release of their debut studio album, Dirt Buyer II in 2023. Joe Sutkowski had written the songs and headed to the studio to record new material for Dirt Buyer III. Sutkowski had expressed that when he was writing the album, "I was just taking time to write as many songs as I could. I didn’t know what it was going to be.” Its lyrics explores themes of isolation and childhood angst.

== Composition ==
Dirt Buyer III is an emo and folk album with elements of slowcore. Sutkowski wrote Dirt Buyer III alongside its producers and engineers, Hayden Ticehurst and Chris Cubeta. BrooklynVegan's Andrew Sacher wrote that "Get To Choose" "jumps from the lo-fi slacker rock of Dirt Buyer’s first two albums into something much higher-fi".

== Release and promotion ==
Sutkowski had announced Dirt Buyer III, the follow-up to Dirt Buyer II (2023) in 2025. On October 2, 2025, Dirt Buyer released the lead single "Betchu Won't". It was later followed by "Get to Choose" on November 18, 2025. In an interview with BrooklynVegan, Sutkowski stated; “This song is about feeling very alone in a situation I didn’t want to be in, but not knowing how to communicate that,” says. “It’s like being really, really tiny and screaming, but you’re too small and nobody can hear you.” "Baseball" would release on December 11, 2025 as the third single. In a press release, Sutkowski explained that the song is "about growing up with certain expectations and adhering to them for no reason other than doing what you’re told" and subsequently "gaining autonomy and independence." "Bullshit Fuck" would release on January 14, 2026, as the fourth and final single.

== Critical reception ==
Professional ratings
Review scores
Source	Rating
Pitchfork	6.5/10

Writing for Pitchfork, Billie Bugara gave the record a score of 6.5 out of 10 and wrote the album was "best at its heaviest, when traumatic tales drowned in waves of distortion and instrumental layering are surrounded by subdued passages that bridge their corrosive cores. While Matt Mitchell writing for Paste wrote "In his stupor of guitar mania on Dirt Buyer III, which covers [...] with a vast and stormy brilliance, Dirt Buyer squares American’s pastime in overdrive."

== Track listing ==
All tracks are written by Joe Sutkowski.

No.	Title	Length
1.	"Baseball"	2:59
2.	"For Me"	3:10
3.	"Halfway"	2:51
4.	"Bullshit Fuck"	3:15
5.	"Betchu Won't"	2:06
6.	"Get to Choose"	3:04
7.	"Wait on the World"	2:45
8.	"Multizeal"	2:13
9.	"Me Before You"	2:21
10.	"Old as Sin"	2:04
11.	"When You Were a Kid"	4:06
Total length:		30:59

== Personnel ==
Credits adapted from Tidal and Bandcamp.

- Joe Sutkowski – vocals, electric guitar (all tracks); bass (tracks 1, 2, 4, 6–11), synthesizer (1, 2, 10)
- Chris Cubeta – recording, production (all tracks); bass (3, 5), synthesizer (3), electric guitar (6)
- Hayden Ticehurst – recording, production
- Ruben Cohen – mastering
- Preston Fulks – drums
- Ruben Radlauer – drums (2)
