= Sidings (album) =

Studio album by Craven Faults
- Released: 23 January 2026
- Length: 1:08:00
- Label: The Leaf Label

Craven Faults chronology
May Birching (2023)	Sidings (2026)

Sidings is the third studio album by British electronic musician Craven Faults. It was released on 26 January 2026, by the Leaf Label.

== Critical reception ==
Professional ratings
Aggregate scores
Source	Rating
Metacritic	78/100
Review scores
Source	Rating
Pitchfork	7.5/10
Spectrum Culture	80%

Sidings was met with "generally favorable" reviews from critics. At Metacritic, which assigns a weighted average rating out of 100 to reviews from mainstream publications, this release received an average score of 78, based on 5 reviews.

== Track listing ==
Sidings track listing
No.	Title	Length
1.	"Ganger"	16:20
2.	"Stoneyman"	14:25
3.	"Yard Loup"	3:21
4.	"Three Loaning End"	4:56
5.	"Up Goods Distant, Down Goods Home"	4:31
6.	"Incline Huttes"	6:01
7.	"Drover Hole Sike"	3:29
8.	"Far Closes"	15:39
Total length:		1:08:00

== Charts ==
Chart performance for Sidings
Chart (2026)	Peak position
Scottish Albums (Official Charts)	60
UK Album Downloads (Official Charts)	4
UK Independent Albums (Official Charts)	9
UK Vinyl Albums (OCC)	24
