= Sluice (musician) =

American indie rock musician

- Also known as: Sluice
- Born: Justin Edward Morris; Winston-Salem, North Carolina, United States
- Genres: Indie rock; Folk
- Years active: 2019–present
- Label: Ruination Record Co.

Sluice is the stage name of American indie rock musician Justin Edward Morris.

== History ==
Morris is from Winston-Salem, North Carolina. Morris attended Richard J. Reynolds High School. Morris was originally in a band with friends during college. Morris moved from North Carolina to New York, where he was living with future Sluice drummer, Avery Sullivan. All residents of the building they were living in moved out while Morris and Sullivan were living there, so they used the basement as a recording studio to make a record. Morris released his first album as Sluice in 2019. Morris released his second album as Sluice, Radial Gate, in 2023 through Ruination Record Co. The album was named one of The Guardian's "The best albums of 2023 so far". The album received a 7.2 out of 10 rating from Pitchfork. Morris opened for Indigo De Souza on her 2023 headlining tour.
