= Smallwood =

Smallwood may refer to:

== People ==
- Alastair Smallwood (1892–1985), American rugby player
- Arwin D. Smallwood, American historian
- Benjamin Franklin Smallwood (1829–1891), Choctaw chief
- Bernie Smallwood (1927–2017), Australian footballer
- Carol Smallwood (born 1939), American poet
- Claire Smallwood, American freeskier
- Clifford Smallwood (1915–1979)
- Denis Smallwood (1918–1997), British RAF commander
- Donavon Smallwood (born 1994), American photographer
- Ed Smallwood (1937–2002), American basketball player
- Edward Smallwood (1861–1939), English coal merchant and politician
- E. Mary Smallwood (1919–2023), British classical historian
- Frank Smallwood (1867–1919), English cricketer and British Army officer
- Fred Smallwood (1910–1965), Welsh footballer
- Gerald Smallwood (1889–1977), British Army general
- George Smallwood (1945–2016), American funk musician
- Gia Lewis-Smallwood (born 1979), American track and field athlete
- Gracelyn Smallwood (born 1951), Australian professor of nursing and midwifery
- Harold Smallwood (1915–1985), American sprinter
- James L. Smallwood (1845–1885), American educator and barber
- Jim Smallwood (born 1971), American politician
- Joan Smallwood (born 1950), Canadian politician
- Joey Smallwood (1900–1991), Canadian politician from Newfoundland
- Jonathan Smallwood (1975–2025), British psychologist and academic
- Jordan Smallwood, American vocalist and drummer for Goodbye Elliott
- Kathy Smallwood-Cook (born 1960), British sprinter
- Kendrick Smallwood (born 2004), American track athlete
- Lola Smallwood-Cuevas, American politician
- Louis Smallwood (1896–?), American baseball player
- Martha R. Field (née Smallwood, 1854–1898), American journalist
- Matthew Smallwood (1614–1683), English Anglican priest
- Namir Smallwood, American stage and film actor
- Neil Smallwood (born 1966), English professional footballer
- Norah Smallwood (1909–1984), English publisher
- Norma Smallwood (1909–1966), American beauty pageant contestant
- Rod Smallwood (born 1950), English music manager
- Rod Smallwood (medical engineer) (born 1945), British medical engineer
- Samora Smallwood, Canadian actress and writer
- Samuel Nicholas Smallwood (1772–1824), American mayor from Washington D.C.
- Shannon Smallwood, Canadian chief justice
- Sheri Smallwood Gilligan (born 1963), American politician
- Stephanie E. Smallwood, American historian
- Thomas Smallwood (1801–1883), American slavery abolitionist
- Thomas Smallwood (basketball) (born 1995), French basketball player
- Thornton Smallwood, American football coach
- Tom Smallwood (born 1977), American ten-pin bowler
- Tucker Smallwood (born 1944), American actor
- Vivian Smallwood (1933–2017), American hip-hop artist known as "Rappin' Granny"
- Walt Smallwood (1893–1967), baseball player
- Wendell Smallwood (born 1994), American football player
- William Smallwood (1732–1792), American general and politician
- William Martin Smallwood (1873–1949), American biologist and professor
- William R. Smallwood (1928–2001), Canadian politician from Newfoundland
- Yawin Smallwood (born 1991), American football player

=== Disambiguation pages ===
- John Smallwood (disambiguation)
- Richard Smallwood (disambiguation)
- Robert Smallwood (disambiguation)

== Fictional characters ==
- Debra Jo Smallwood from The Simpsons episode "A Streetcar Named Marge" (1992)
- Lady Elizabeth Smallwood from the British mystery crime drama television series Sherlock
- Marrina Smallwood, Marvel Comics superhero
- Sam Smallwood from the British soap opera Hollyoaks
- Tyler Smallwood from The Vampire Diaries novel series (renamed to Tyler Lockwood in the television show)

== Places ==
- Smallwood, Cheshire, England
- Smallwood, Worcestershire, England
- Smallwood, New York, USA
- Smallwood Township, Jasper County, Illinois
- Smallwood Reservoir, Labrador, Canada
- Benjamin Franklin Smallwood House, Oklahoma, USA
- Eli Smallwood House, North Carolina, USA
- Fort Smallwood Park, Maryland, USA
- Ted Smallwood Store, Florida, USA

== Other ==
- Dink Smallwood, computer role-playing game
- MV Joseph and Clara Smallwood, Marine Atlantic passenger ferry operating in the Gulf of St. Lawrence
- Smallwood, Reynolds, Stewart, Stewart, Architecture Firm, Atlanta, branded as Smallwood

== See also ==
- Littlewood, a surname and a list of people with the name
