= Littlewood =

Littlewood is a surname, and may refer to:

- Alison Littlewood, British author
- Angela Littlewood (born 1949), English shot putter
- Barclay Littlewood (born 1978), British entrepreneur
- Chic Littlewood (1930–2015), New Zealand actor
- Clayton Littlewood (born 1963), English author
- David Littlewood (born 1955), English cricketer
- Dominic Littlewood (born 1965), British television presenter and entrepreneur
- Dudley E. Littlewood (1903–1979), British mathematician
- France Littlewood (1863–1941), British socialist
- George Littlewood Sr. (1857–1928), English cricketer
- George Littlewood Jr. (1882–1917), English cricketer
- Harry Littlewood (1921–2003), English actor
- Herbert Littlewood (1858–1925), English cricketer
- Ivan Littlewood (1902–1951), New Zealand rugby player
- Jesse Littlewood (1878–1942), English cricketer
- Jessica Littlewood, Canadian politician
- Joan Littlewood (1914–2002), British actress and theatre director
- John Edensor Littlewood (1885–1977), British mathematician
- John Littlewood (chess player) (1931–2009), British chess player
- Leslie Littlewood (1906–1989), British trade unionist
- Louise Littlewood, Australian politician
- Mark Littlewood (born 1972), Director General of the Institute of Economic Affairs
- Mike Littlewood (born 1966), American college baseball coach
- Norman Littlewood (1933–1989), British chess player
- Peter Littlewood (1955–2026), British physicist
- Rick Littlewood (1940–2018), New Zealand judoka
- Roland Littlewood (1947–2025), British anthropologist, psychiatrist and academic
- Stewart Littlewood (1905–1977), English footballer
- William Littlewood, American engineer
- Yvonne Littlewood (1927–2023), British television director

== See also ==
- Littlewoods, retail company
- Smallwood (disambiguation)
