= Charmaine =

Charmaine may refer to:

- Charmaine, a character in What Price Glory?
- "Charmaine" (song), the theme song for the 1926 adaptation of What Price Glory
- "Charmaine" (rap song), a 2006 song by Plan B
- Charmaine (musician), a Christian pop singer

== People with the given name ==
- Charmaine Ayoku, (born 2002), English singer-songwriter better known as Dexter in the Newsagent
- Charmaine Bingwa, Zimbabwean-Australian actor, writer and director
- Charmaine Borg (born 1990), Canadian politician
- Charmaine Cree, Australian Paralympic athlete
- Charmaine Dean (born 1958), statistician from Trinidad, president of Statistical Society of Canada
- Charmaine Dragun (1978–2007), Australian broadcast journalist and presenter
- Charmaine Li (born 1983), Chinese actress
- Charmaine Marchand-Stiaes, American politician
- Charmaine Pountney, New Zealand educator
- Charmaine Scotty, Nauruan politician
- Charmaine Sheh (born 1975), Chinese actress
- Charmaine Fong (born 1980), Chinese singer and actress
- Charmaine 'Ilaiū Talei
- Charmaine (musician)
- Charmaine (rapper)
- Charmaine Bennell
- Charmaine Brooks

== See also ==
- Charlaine
