= Idk Idk =

2026 single by Jim Legxacy

Single by Jim Legxacy
- Written: 2025
- Released: 24 March 2026
- Genre: UK rap; jerk
- Length: 2:26
- Label: Self-released
- Songwriters: Jim Legxacy; Joe Stanley; .nathan.; Henes; Boyred; Vuko; Saint Demarcus; Flowers in Narnia; Prodkavin
- Producers: Jim Legxacy; .nathan.; Joe Stanley; Vuko; Henes; Boyred; Saint Demarcus

Jim Legxacy singles chronology
| "Stick" (2025) | "Idk Idk" (2026) |

"Idk Idk" (stylized in all lowercase) is a song by British rapper and singer Jim Legxacy, self-released on 24 March 2026. It was his first release following his acclaimed mixtape Black British Music (2025) the previous year and marked a change in his lyricism from extrospective to introspective. Legxacy raps on an upbeat jerk instrumental about doubt and anxiety; the single was accompanied by a music video and was praised by critics.

== Background and release ==
In 2025, Legxacy released the critically acclaimed mixtape Black British Music (2025). He first previewed "Idk Idk" alongside other unreleased music at a pop-up event in South London earlier that year. The song's music video, directed by Rohan Dil, incorporated a mixed-media, 2010s-throwback aesthetic and follows Legxacy and his friends having fun around London.

== Composition and lyrics ==
"Idk Idk" marks a shift in Jim Legxacy's lyricism from his previous project, Black British Music (2025), which was more outward-looking and extrospective. "Idk Idk" is hopeful and introspective, being described by Complex as "exploring uncertainty, pressure, and the emotional weight that comes with growth." He also alludes to his late younger sister.

The song has an upbeat jerk instrumental and is built on a looping refrain and reflects on questions posed by Legxacy of doubt and anxiety. It begins with a soulful sample of female vocals before leading into "jumpy synths" and Legxacy's blend of melodic singing and rapping. Stereogum described the song's beat as "nervous and jittery lo-fi before layering on more and more elements until it becomes life-affirming, gospel-adjacent dance music." The song also incorporates harmonies from English singer Natanya.

== Reception ==
Andrew White of Complex noted that the song's shift in tone could signal a closing of the themes brought up in Black British Music (2025) and a start of a future trajectory for Legxacy. On the contrary, HotNewHipHop writer Alexander Cole stated that the song would have been a hit single off the mixtape and that Legxacy had finally found his sound.
