= Father (Jim Legxacy song) =

2025 single by Jim Legxacy

Single by Jim Legxacy

from the album Black British Music (2025)
- Released: 27 February 2025
- Genre: UK rap; chipmunk soul
- Length: 1:47
- Label: XL Recordings
- Songwriters: Jim Legxacy; George Smallwood
- Producers: Baby Cashy; Jim Legxacy; Joe Stanley; YT

Jim Legxacy singles chronology
"Aggressive" (2024)	"Father" (2025)	"Stick" (2025)

"Father" (stylized in all lowercase) is a song by British rapper and singer Jim Legxacy from his second mixtape Black British Music (2025). It was released on 27 February 2025, through XL Recordings, as the mixtape's lead single, and his second release on the record label since signing in October 2024. He posted a teaser of "Father" at the time, which led to anticipation for its release. The song was produced by Legxacy, Baby Cashy, Joe Stanley, and YT.

Throughout the song, which samples George Smallwood's "I Love My Father" (1981), Legxacy sing-raps about growing up without a father and his teenage life on the streets of Lewisham. "Father" is generally categorised as UK rap and chipmunk soul. The music video for "Father" was released the same day as the single, which showcases Legxacy with Frutiger Aero-style visuals that detail his childhood in 2000s London.

"Father" received positive reviews from music critics, considering it to represent Legxacy's versatility and vulnerability. Commercially, the song peaked at number twelve on the UK Official Independent Singles Breakers chart and was later nominated for Video of the Year at the MOBO Awards 2026.

== Background and release ==
In October 2024, UK rapper and singer Jim Legxacy signed with British record label XL Recordings after a series of self-released singles. His debut single on the label, "Aggressive", was released on 7 October 2024 and received positive reviews from music critics. During that year, Legxacy posted a teaser of "Father", leading to fans anticipating for its release.

On 27 February 2025, Legxacy released "Father" as the debut single for his second mixtape Black British Music (2025), with an accompanying music video directed by Lauzza. With distribution from XL Records, it was initially the second single for the mixtape, but "Aggressive" was cut out for unknown reasons. The cover art for "Father" is a photograph of Legxacy's biological father. On 18 July 2025, Black British Music (2025) was released, with "Father" serving as the seventh track on the mixtape.

== Music and lyrics ==
"Father"
A 10-second sample of "Father", which emphasizes a chipmunk soul style with Legxacy's "singsong" rap style.

Legxacy co-produced "Father" with Cashy, Joe Stanley, and YT. It is built on a sped-up sample of George Smallwood's disco-soul song "I Love My Father" (1981) in less than two minutes. Legxacy manipulated the song from being about "unconditional love for a flawed figure into his own tale about absentee dads" with a chipmunk soul sound.

"Father" begins with an intro stating, "Black British music/We’ve been making asses shake since the Windrush." Featuring only eight bars, Legxacy raps in a "dizzy singsong" style about growing up without a father. He vividly describes his teenage years on the streets of Lewisham, where he's "rolling up a blunt" and "scheming for the funds". Legxacy mentions that he was "on the block" while listening to Mitski, connecting to his unconventional music influences that contrasts his lifestyle at the time. Wonderland described "Father" as a "magnificent mash-up of sorrowful reflections, cheek-laden one-liners and choppy samples."

== Reception ==
HotNewHipHop writer Devin Morton complimented "Father" as showcasing Legxacy's versatility and vulnerability, stating that that his music combined various influences. He compared his vocal style to Drake and Mitski. Pitchfork writer Alphonso Pierre included the music video for "Father" as an example of UK rappers' use of Y2K nostalgia. Megan Lapierre of Exclaim! included the song as an example of Legxacy's use of "both precision and experimental joie de vere". Commercially, "Father" peaked at number twelve on the UK Official Independent Singles Breakers chart, on the week of 13 March 2025.

"Father" received recognition in year-end best song lists. Complex UK ranked father at number three on their "Best Songs of 2025" list. Dazed ranked "Father" at number five on their "20 Best Tracks of 2025" list, considering it to be thematically impressive and contain a diverse range of influences. Slant ranked the song at number 49 on their "The 50 Best Songs of 2025" list, considering the song as an example of "ruminative and introspective" tracks.

== Music video ==
Directed by Lauzza, the music video's visuals resemble a collage based on a "humdrum 2000s London childhood", where Legxacy is shown in "detailed illustrations of chicken shops, bus stops, and the classroom." After he catches a city bus to ride to school with a uniform, Legxacy is seen "goofing off in class with his friends" and playing Xbox in his bedroom. Rolling Stone writer Jeff Ihaza said that the music video is based on the early 2000s graphic design aesthetic Frutiger Aero, which defined an era of British youth culture. The music video later received a nomination for Video of the Year at the MOBO Awards 2026.

== Personnel ==
Credits were adapted from Tidal.

- Jim Legxacy – vocals, writing, production, mixing engineer
- George Smallwood – writing (sample)
- Baby Cashy – production
- Joe Stanley – production
- YT – production
- Freeze – mastering, mixing engineer

== Charts ==
Chart (2025)	Peak position
UK Independent Singles Breakers Chart (Official Charts)	12
