= Unctuous =

Unctuous may refer to:

- Unctuous (monster), a character in Big Bad Beetleborgs and Power Rangers in Space

== See also ==
- Father Todd Unctious, character in Father Ted
