= Jesse Littlewood =

English cricketer

Jesse Littlewood (8 April 1878 — 27 October 1942) was an English cricketer. He was a left-handed bowler who played first-class cricket for Essex. He was born in Holmfirth and died in Kidderminster.

Littlewood made one first-class appearance for the team, against Derbyshire in 1905. Littlewood had previously made three appearances for Lancashire's Second XI and one for Essex's Second XI between 1899 and 1903.

Littlewood's brother, George and father, also named George were also first-class cricketers.
