= Homeless N*gga Pop Music =

Mixtape by Jim Legxacy
- Released: 26 April 2023
- Genres: Afrobeats; emo; drill; grime; glitch; UK garage
- Length: 25:09
- Label: (!)

Jim Legxacy chronology
Citadel (2021)	Homeless N*gga Pop Music (2023)	Black British Music (2025) (2025)

Singles from Homeless N*gga Pop Music
- 1. "Eye Tell (!)" Released: 31 March 2022; 2. "Hit It Light It Twist It" Released: 19 May 2022; 3. "DJ" Released: 20 October 2022; 4. "Old Place" Released: 2 March 2023

Homeless N*gga Pop Music (shortened to HNPM) is the debut mixtape by British rapper and record producer Jim Legxacy. It was released on 26 April 2023.

== Release ==
On 31 March 2022, Jim Legxacy released the mixtape's first single, titled "Eye Tell (!)". The track was listed as The Fader's 15th best song of 2022. On 19 May 2022, he released the mixtape's second single, titled "Hit It Light It Twist It". On 20 October 2022, he release the mixtape's third single, titled "DJ". On 2 March 2023, he released the mixtape's fourth and final single, titled "Old Place".

== Critical reception ==
Professional ratings
Review scores
Source	Rating
The Arts Desk	5/5 stars
NME	5/5 stars
Pitchfork	7.8/10

=== Accolades ===
Select year-end rankings of Homeless N*gga Pop Music
Critic/Publication	List	Rank	Ref.
Complex UK	Best Albums Of 2023	7	
Crack	The Top 50 Albums of the Year	1	
Dazed	The 20 best albums of 2023	14	
The Fader	The 50 best albums of 2023	46	
Gorilla vs. Bear	Albums of 2023	25	
The Guardian	The 50 best albums of 2023	42	
Paste	The 25 Best Hip-Hop Albums of 2023	—N/a	

== Track listing ==
All tracks written and produced by Jim Legxacy unless listed.

No.	Title	Writer(s)	Producer(s)	Length
1.	"DJ"			2:15
2.	"Candy Reign (!)"	Aine Morris; Robert Dixon		2:18
3.	"Amnesia111"			2:35
4.	"Mileys Riddim (Has Been Removed Off Streaming Services Since 10 September 2026)"			1:59
5.	"Eye Tell (!)"			2:10
6.	"Old Place"			1:38
7.	"Block Hug"		Jim Legxacy; Kare; TRTheProducer	2:52
8.	"Ur Marges Crib"
9.	"Fake Smiles"		Legxacy; Phil	2:37
10.	"Call Ur Dad"		Legxacy; Fil Yonder; Phil	1:22
11.	"Homeless Nigga Pop Music"			1:29
12.	"Hit It Light It Twist It"			1:54
Total length:				25:09

=== Notes ===
- "Dj" contains a sample of "Homerton B" as performed by Unknown T.
- "Candy reign (!)" contains a sample of "Candy Rain" as performed by Soul for Real and an interpolation of "Wifey" as performed by Tinie Tempah.
- "Mileys riddim" contains a sample of "Ordinary Girl" as performed by Miley Cyrus.
- "OId place" contains a sample of "Grip & Ride" as performed by Harlem Spartans.
- "Block hug" contains a sample of "Let’s Lurk" as performed by 67 and Giggs.
- "Hit it light it twist it" contains a sample of "Nasty" as performed by Skepta.
