= Charlayne =

Charlayne is a given name. Notable people with this name include the following:

- Charlayne Hunter-Gault (born 1942), American journalist
- Charlayne Woodard, referrent of Charlaine Woodard (born 1953), American playwright and actress

== See also ==
- Charlaine
- Charlyne
- Charmayne James
