= Stick (Jim Legxacy song) =

Single by Jim Legxacy

from the album Black British Music (2025)
- Released: 10 April 2025
- Genre: Grime; R&B
- Length: 2:19
- Label: XL Recordings
- Composers: Jim Legxacy; Joe Stanley
- Lyricist: Jim Legxacy
- Producers: Jim Legxacy; Joe Stanley

Jim Legxacy singles chronology
"Father" (2025)	"Stick" (2025)	"Idk Idk" (2026)

"Stick" (stylized in all lowercase) is a song by British rapper and producer Jim Legxacy from his second mixtape, Black British Music (2025). It was premiered during a livestream with American streamer and rapper PlaqueBoyMax before being released as the mixtape's second single on 10 April 2025 via XL Recordings. Legxacy had signed with the record label the previous year for the singles "Aggressive" and "Father", officially teasing the mixtape after releasing the former.

"Stick" is an uptempo track that music critics noted as not having a distinct genre, though it features influences from genres such as grime and R&B. Lyrically, the song focuses on Legxacy's life before his music career and the struggles he faced, with the chorus being sung by co-composer and producer Joe Stanley. "Stick" received acclaim from critics, who often praised its catchiness and vulnerable lyrics.

== Background and recording ==
In October 2024, Jim Legxacy signed with British record label XL Recordings after a series of self-released singles. His debut single on the label, "Aggressive", was released on 7 October 2024 and received positive reviews from music critics. Shortly after signing, he began teasing his second mixtape, Black British Music (2025), which originally had "2024" in the title's parenthesis. "Father" was subsequently released as the mixtape's lead single on 27 February 2025. Both singles were accompanied by music videos upon their release. Prior to its release, "Stick" was previewed on a livestream with American streamer and rapper PlaqueBoyMax.

The lyric to "Stick" was written by Legxacy, who composed and co-produced it with British record producer Joe Stanley. The song was engineered and programmed by Legxacy, mixed by Freeze, and mastered by Beau Thomas. Stanley served as a studio musician and laid the track's synthesiser.

== Composition and lyrics ==
"Stick"
A 17-second sample of "Stick", featuring its lo-fi production and Stanley's background harmonies.

Musically, "Stick" is an uptempo track with unpolished production, featuring layered lo-fi guitars and overlapping vocals. Tanz Jeyacheya of Clash described its style as not having a genre, describing it as "everything and nothing" while noting that most would consider it a mix of grime, indie, and R&B. HotNewHipHop's Devin Morton believed that Legxacy took "some inspiration from artists like Drake and Frank Ocean," but felt that the final song is still recognizably his style. Legxacy had previously acknowledged Ocean as an influence in a 2020 interview with Equate. The song features vocal samples from "Going Through It" by Skepta, with the line "Man I been going through it" being looped throughout.

The chorus to "Stick" is sung by Stanley, whose harmonies are similar to that usually associated gospel music. In the verses, Legxacy shades fellow artists who "bite swag" and are confused on why it never gets them fame. He discusses his life during the "come-up" of his career, mentioning being evicted, hanging around drug dealers, and having to leave a female partner after the "rain came and he crashed out." The second verse features the catchy refrain of "stick, stick, stick".

== Release and reception ==
"Stick" was released on 10 April 2025 as the second single from Black British Music. It was released alongside a music video directed by frequent collaborator Rohan Dil, portions of which were shot using a BlackBerry cell phone. The video received positive reviews, with New Wave Magazine calling it "effortlessly cool". Black British Music released on 18 July 2025 and featured "Stick" as its second track.

Upon its release as a single, "Stick" received acclaim from music critics. Jeyacheya described it as an "anthem of chaos, heartbreak, and Black British becoming", praising the song's "outside the limits of genre" style of production and lyrical vulnerability, which reminds us that Black Britishness is vast, vulnerable, and here to stay." In particular, he complimented the lyrics for not using masculinity as "armour." In his review, Morton called it "another quality single" and an "overall" good track from Legxacy. Music blog When the Horn Blows named the song "one of the crown jewels of Black British Music" and "easily one of the best tracks to come out of the UK" in 2025. Chris DeVille of Stereogum wrote that "Stick" exceeded the "ultra-catchy and ultra-hard" standards set by Legxacy's previous work.
