= Black British Music (2025) =

2025 mixtape by Jim Legxacy

Mixtape by Jim Legxacy
- Released: 18 July 2025
- Genres: UK rap, UK underground rap
- Length: 34:55
- Label: XL
- Producers: Jim Legxacy; Baby Cashy; BoyRed; Cole YoursTruly; Cppo; DameDame*; Dre Denim; Fritz!; Fumez; Henes; Phil Hamilton; Hoskins; Jkarri; J Moon; Kiri; Lucid; Nathan; Rahitsbkay; Sai on the Beat; Joe Stanley; YT

Jim Legxacy chronology
Homeless N*gga Pop Music (2023)	Black British Music (2025) (2025)

Singles from Black British Music (2025)
- 1. "Father" Released: 27 February 2025; 2. "Stick" Released: 10 April 2025; 3. "3x" Released: 18 July 2025; 4. "'06 Wayne Rooney" Released: 6 November 2025

Black British Music (2025) is the second mixtape by British rapper and producer Jim Legxacy, released on 18 July 2025 through XL Recordings. The follow-up to his mixtape Homeless N*gga Pop Music (2023), it features guest appearances from fellow British musicians Dave, Fimiguerrero, and Dexter in the Newsagent. Legxacy primarily handled production himself, alongside Joe Stanley, Cppo, J Moon, and Dre Denim, among others.

Black British Music (2025) received critical acclaim, featuring on multiple year-end lists, and debuted at number 29 on the UK Albums Chart.

== Background and release ==
On 8 July 2025, Jim Legxacy announced that Black British Music (2025) would be released on 18 July.

== Composition ==
=== Overview ===
Black British Music is an experimental rap album, with reviewer Mehan Jayasuriya writing how the album sees Legxacy combine "audio moodboards, stitching together spidery emo guitar lines, Afrobeat drums, recognizable samples, and of-the-moment rhythms like Jersey club."

== Promotion ==
=== Singles ===
On 27 February 2025, Jim Legxacy released the first single, "Father", on streaming services.

"Stick", the second single, was released on 10 April 2025.

"3x", featuring fellow British rapper Dave, was released as the third single alongside the album release on 18 July 2025.

"'06 Wayne Rooney" was released as the fourth single alongside an accompanying music video on 6 November 2025.

== Critical reception ==
Professional ratings
Aggregate scores
Source	Rating
Metacritic	90/100
Review scores
Source	Rating
Clash	9/10
The Guardian	5/5 stars
NME	5/5 stars
Paste	8/10
Pitchfork	7.8/10
Rolling Stone	4/5 stars

According to the review aggregator Metacritic, Black British Music (2025) received "universal acclaim" based on a weighted average score of 90 out of 100 from 6 critic scores. Pitchfork called the album "some of Legxacy's best production and songwriting yet; he's beginning to sound like the second coming of cut-and-paste icon Jai Paul. Here, Legxacy is at his best when commanding tracks that are propulsive and chaotic: Samples collide headfirst, drums snap with the force of fingers on pads, drops overpower everything in the mix". NME called it a "potential future classic". Sheldon Pearce of NPR described the album as "a jumbled, marvelous survey of 21st century U.K. rap, identifying connective tissue with Afrobeats, emo, drill and garage." Jon Caramanica of The New York Times called the album a "homage to the last two decades of Black British music." The Economist included the album in their top 10 albums of 2025, describing it as "the most intriguing British hip-hop release of the year".

=== Year-end lists ===
List of year‑end rankings, with publication, list, ranking and reference shown
Publication	List	Rank	Ref.
Billboard	The 50 Best Albums of 2025	21	
British GQ	20 Best Albums of 2025	No ranking given	
Clash	Top 60 Albums of the Year 2025	5	
Complex	The 50 Best Albums of 2025	5	
Complex UK	Best Albums Of 2025	1	
Crack	The Top 50 Albums of 2025	4	
Dazed	The Best Albums of 2025	3	
DJ Mag	Top Albums of 2025	No ranking given	
Dork	Albums of the Year 2025	37	
The Economist	The Top 10 Albums of 2025	No ranking given	
The Fader	The 50 Best Albums of 2025	18	
Gorilla vs. Bear	Albums of 2025	17	
HotNewHipHop	The 40 Best Rap Albums of 2025	11	
The Line of Best Fit	2025 Albums of the Year	4	
Loud and Quiet	Albums of the Year 2025	4	
The New York Times	Best Albums of 2025	2	
NME	The 50 Best Albums of 2025	14	
Paste	The 50 Best Albums of 2025	25	
Paste	The 25 Best Rap Albums of 2025	12	
Rolling Stone	The 100 Best Albums of 2025	38	
Rolling Stone	The Best Hip-Hop Albums of 2025	4	
Rolling Stone UK	25 Best Albums of 2025	No ranking given	
The Quietus	Albums of the Year 2025	41	
Stereogum	The 10 Best Rap Albums Of 2025	5	

== Track listing ==
Credits adapted from Tidal.

No.	Title	Writer(s)	Producer(s)	Length
1.	"Context"	James Olaloye; Joe Stanley; Lucien Dunne	Jim Legxacy; Lucid	1:59
2.	"Stick"	Olaloye; Stanley	Legxacy; Stanley	2:19
3.	"New David Bowie"	Olaloye; Julian Arnone; Justice Ude; Jon Bellion; Jason Cornet; Jason Johnson; Stefan Johnson	Legxacy; BoyRed; Cppo; Baby Cashy	2:14
4.	"Sun" (with Fimiguerrero)	Olaloye; Fimihan Akinola; Stanley; Karan Behl; Bryan Kabangale; Phil Hamilton	Legxacy; Stanley; Fumez; Rahitsbkay; Hamilton; Lucid; Cole YoursTruly	3:04
5.	"'06 Wayne Rooney"	Olaloye; Stanley; Jay Mooncie	J Moon	2:40
6.	"Issues of Trust"	Olaloye	Legxacy; Stanley	2:00
7.	"Father"	Olaloye; George Smallwood	Legxacy; Baby Cashy; YT	1:46
8.	"D.B.A.B"	Olaloye; Mooncie	J Moon	2:36
9.	"Big Time Forward"	Olaloye; Mooncie; Mark Lawumsai	Legxacy; J Moon; Sai on the Beat	1:45
10.	"SOS"	Olaloye; Nathan Osai-Prempeh; Stanley; Bob Robinson; Dill Aitchison; Joshua Gaskin-Brown; Joe Thomas; Joshua Thompson; Nolan Ogbebor; Tim Kelley	Legxacy; Nathan; Stanley; Kiri; Phil; Jkarri	2:16
11.	"I Just Banged a Snus in Canada Water"	Olaloye; Ude; Oluwatimilehim Bakare-Temison	Legxacy; Cppo; Kare	2:12
12.	"Dexters Phone Call" (with Dexter in the Newsagent)	Charmaine Ayoku; Olaloye; Andre Denim; Adam Fritzler; Stanley	Legxacy; Dre Denim; Fritz!; Stanley	2:32
13.	"3x" (with Dave)	Olaloye; David Omoregie; Stanley; Kieran Henney; Ude; Ogbebor	Legxacy; Stanley; Henes; Hoskins; Cppo	2:40
14.	"Tiger Driver '91"	Olaloye; Stanley; Denim; Madison Nadurata	Legxacy; Stanley; Dre Denim	2:06
15.	"Brief"	Olaloye; Barbara Hyouhat; Edith Nelson	Legxacy; DameDame*; Stanley	2:39
Total length:				34:55

=== Notes ===
- All track titles are stylised in lowercase; for example, "Context" is stylised as "context".
- "Stick" features additional vocals from Joe Stanley and vocal samples of "Going Through It", written by Joseph Adenuga and Stewart Mullings and performed by Skepta.
- "New David Bowie" contains a sample of "Wash", written by Jon Bellion, Jason Cornet, Jason Johnson, Stef Johnson and Pete Nappi, and performed by Bellion.
- "Sun" features an interpolation of "Did You See", written by Momodou Jallow and Jonathan Mensah and performed by J Hus.
- "06 Wayne Rooney" features an interpolation of "Hey Ya!", written by André Benjamin and performed by Outkast.
- "Father" features a sample of "I Love My Father", written and performed by George Smallwood.
- "D.B.A.B" features an interpolation of "Warning" written and performed by Errol Bellot as Kojo Funds; which also interpolates "Informer", written by Darrin O'Brien, Shawn Moltke, Edmond Leary, Terri Moltke and Jeffrey Silva, and performed by Snow.
- "SOS" features a sample of "Missing You", written by Joe Thomas, Tim Kelley and Bob Robinson, as performed by Case.
- "3x" features an interpolation of "Wanna Know", written by David Omoregie, Fraser T. Smith and Tyrell Paul, and performed by Dave.

== Personnel ==
Credits adapted from Tidal.

=== Vocals ===
- Jim Legxacy – lead vocals
- Fimiguerrero – vocals (4)
- Dexter in the Newsagent – vocals (12)
- Dave – vocals (13)

=== Musicians ===
- Joe Stanley – synthesizer (1, 2), programming (1, 14), guitar (4)
- Jim Legxacy – programming (2–4, 6, 11–13, 15), synthesizer (14)
- BoyRed – programming (3)
- Cppo – programming (3, 11, 13)
- Cole YoursTruly – guitar (4)
- Fumez – programming (4)
- J Moon – programming (5, 8), guitar (5, 9), synthesizer (8)
- Baby Cashy – programming (7)
- YT – programming (7)
- Sai on the Beat – bass guitar (9)
- Kiri – guitar (10)
- Phil – strings (10)
- Jkarri – synthesizer (10)
- Kare – programming (11)
- Dre Denim – programming (12)
- Fritz! – programming (12)
- Hoskins – guitar, programming (13)
- Henes – programming (13)
- DameDame* (Barbara Hyouhat, Edith Nelson) – piano, programming (15)

=== Technical ===
- Lexxx – mastering engineer (1, 4–6, 9, 11, 12, 14, 15), mixing engineer (1, 4–6, 8, 9, 11, 12, 14, 15), recording engineer (8)
- Beau Thomas – mastering engineer (2)
- Freeze – mastering engineer (3, 7, 13), mixing engineer (2, 3, 7, 13)
- Nickie Jon Pabón – mastering engineer, mixing engineer (10)
- Jim Legxacy – mixing engineer (7), recording engineer (2)

== Charts ==
Chart performance for Black British Music (2025)
Chart (2025)	Peak position
UK Albums (Official Charts)	29
UK Independent Albums (Official Charts)	13
UK R&B Albums (Official Charts)	3
