= Jim Legxacy =

British rapper and record producer

- Born: James Folorunso Ifeanyi Olaloye; June 8, 1999 (age 27); Lewisham, London, England
- Genres: UK rap; alternative rap; grime; alternative rock; alternative R&B
- Occupations: Rapper; singer; songwriter; record producer
- Years active: 2019–present
- Label: XL Recordings
- Website: www.jimlegxacy.com

James Folorunso Ifeanyi Olaloye (born June 8, 1999) known professionally as Jim Legxacy (pronounced "legacy"), is a British rapper, singer, and record producer from Catford, London Borough of Lewisham. He has been associated with the rise of the UK underground scene.

He has released three EPs and two mixtapes, the latest of which, Black British Music (2025), was on XL Recordings and his first on a label. His music has been described as mixing "rap, lo-fi, emo, Afrobeat and eclectic samples."

As of April 2026, Legxacy is currently working on his upcoming debut album.

== Early life ==
Olaloye is of Nigerian descent and was raised in the London Borough of Lewisham. Prior to his music career, he attended art school and aimed to pursue a career as a graphic designer.

== Career ==
Legxacy began making music at 19, after hearing Kanye West's album The Life of Pablo. He released his first EP, Dynasty Program: A Metrical Composition Inspired by the Nights Spent as the Raiider, in 2019. BTO!, his second EP, released in 2020. He released his Citadel EP in 2021 and performed his first live show at The Waiting Room in Islington in December 2021. His debut mixtape, Homeless N*gga Pop Music, was released on 26 April 2023. Legxacy co-wrote, co-produced, and contributed background vocals on the 2023 song "Sprinter" for Central Cee and Dave. It became the longest-running number-one rap song in the UK, holding the position for 10 weeks.

On 4 July 2024, he released the song "nothings changed (!)" and dedicated it to the memory of his sister, Atinuke Olaloye, who had died of sickle cell anaemia the previous year. He is credited on two tracks from Fred Again's 2024 album Ten Days, including a feature on the album's second single "Ten." His second mixtape, Black British Music (2025), was released via XL Recordings on 18 July 2025 and was his first on a label.

Legxacy featured and voice acted in the Lego "stop-motion-slash-talk show" web series Pick a Piece alongside Jorja Smith and Ninajirachi.

== Artistry ==
Legxacy's music was described by Georgia Mulraine for DJ Mag as mixing "rap, lo-fi, emo, Afrobeat and eclectic samples". Niall Smith, writing for NME, said Black British Music (2025) blends "grime, R&B, Afro-fusion, UK rap and folk".

He has cited JPEGMafia, MF Doom, Bon Iver, Frank Ocean, SZA, and Kendrick Lamar as influences on his music.

Mehan Jayasuriya, writing for Pitchfork, describes his production style as "stitching together spidery emo guitar lines, Afrobeat drums, recognizable samples, and of-the-moment rhythms like Jersey club". Jayasuriya goes on to describe Legxacy's vocals, "he can sing with a gentle flutter, rap ferociously, and do just about everything in between".

Grant Sharples for Paste, in reference to Legxacy's stylistic progression, says, "while black british music largely adheres to the Afrobeats-emo fusion he cemented on hnpm, he adapts that blend in fresh ways, whether it’s through acoustic balladry, lush alt-pop, or anthemic Britpop".

== Discography ==
=== Mixtapes ===
List of mixtapes, with selected chart positions, sales figures and certifications
Title	Mixtape details	Peak chart positions		
Title	Mixtape details	UK	UK R&B	UK Ind.
Homeless N*gga Pop Music	Released: 26 April 2023; Label: (!); Format: Digital download, streaming, LP, CD	—	—	—
Black British Music (2025)	Released: 18 July 2025; Label: XL Recordings; Format: CD, LP, digital download, NFC, streaming	31	3	13
"—" denotes a recording that did not chart in that territory.

=== Extended plays ===
List of extended plays, with selected chart positions, sales figures and certifications
Title	EP details
Dynasty Program: A Metrical Composition Inspired by the Nights Spent as the Raiider	Released: 1 November 2019; Label: Raiider; Formats: Digital download, streaming
BTO!	Released: 13 October 2020; Label: OHX; Formats: Digital download, streaming
Citadel	Released: 3 December 2021; Label: OHX; Formats: Digital download, streaming

=== Singles ===
==== As lead artist ====
List of singles as lead artist, with selected chart positions, year released and album name shown
Title	Year	Peak chart positions		Album
Title	Year	UK	UK R&B	Album
"Willyoustabmeinmyheart"	2019	—	—	Dynasty Program: A Metrical Composition Inspired by the Nights Spent As the Raiider
"Cold Lewisham Roses"	2021	—	—	Citadel
"Andromeda"	2021	—	—	Citadel
"Eye Tell (!)"	2022	—	—	Homeless N*gga Pop Music
"Hit It Light It Twist It"	2022	—	—	Homeless N*gga Pop Music
"Candy Reign (!)"	2022	—	—	Homeless N*gga Pop Music
"Dj"	2022	—	—	Homeless N*gga Pop Music
"Old Place"	2023	—	—	Non-album singles
"Amnesia111"	2023	—	—	Non-album singles
"Nothings Changed (!)"	2024	—	—	Non-album singles
"Aggressive"	2024	—	—	Non-album singles
"Father"	2025	—	—	Black British Music (2025)
"Stick"	2025	—	—	Black British Music (2025)
"3x" (featuring Dave)	2025	72	21	Black British Music (2025)
"'06 Wayne Rooney"	2025	—	—	Black British Music (2025)
"Idk Idk"	2026	—	—	TBA
"—" denotes a recording that did not chart in that territory.

==== As featured artist ====
List of singles as a featured artist, with selected chart positions, year released and album name shown
Title	Year	Album
"Ten" (Fred Again featuring Jozzy and Jim Legxacy)	2024	Ten Days

=== Other charted songs ===
List of other charted songs, with selected chart positions, showing year released and album name
Title	Year	Peak chart positions			Album
Title	Year	UK	UK R&B	NZ Hot	Album
"No Weapons" (Dave featuring Jim Legxacy)	2025	72	34	14	The Boy Who Played the Harp

=== Guest appearances ===
List of non-single guest appearances, with other performing artists, showing year released and album name
Title	Year	Other performer(s)	Album
"Nostalgia99Till16"	2020	P.S. 4080	Day 0
"Walk Through the Fire"	2025	Chri$DaPrince	Like Never before

=== Production discography ===
List of production and songwriting credits (excluding guest appearances, interpolations, and samples)
Track(s)	Year	Credit	Artist(s)	Album
1. "Power Trip"	2020	Songwriter, co-producer (with Wayward)	Jim Legxacy	BTO!
3. "Despite Pain"	2020	Songwriter, co-producer (with Wayward)	Jim Legxacy	BTO!
1. "Kkardachev Scale"	2021	Songwriter, co-producer (with Comboy & Evelavted)	Jim Legxacy	Citadel
2. "Andromeda"	2021	Songwriter, co-producer (with Comboy & Jay Blu)	Jim Legxacy	Citadel
3. "Ghost Recon"	2021	Songwriter, co-producer (with Comboy)	Jim Legxacy	Citadel
4. "Cold Lewisham Roses"	2021	Songwriter, co-producer (with Comboy & WVLDF_DJ)	Jim Legxacy	Citadel
5. "Anubis Cruger"	2021	Songwriter, producer	Jim Legxacy	Citadel
6. "The day I Broke My Bike"	2021	Songwriter, co-producer (with Alex Noorari & Andy J)	Jim Legxacy	Citadel
7. "I Don’t Like How Star Wars Treated John Boyega"	2021	Songwriter, co-producer (with Jonah)	Jim Legxacy	Citadel
8. "Corpses (!)"	2021	Songwriter, producer	Jim Legxacy	Citadel
9. "Partners in Crime"	2021	Songwriter, co-producer (with Comboy, Alex Noorari, Andy J, Mack Woodling & Tejy)	Jim Legxacy	Citadel
10. "Nero Playing the Fiddle from the Citadel"	2021	Songwriter, co-producer (with Comboy)	Jim Legxacy	Citadel
"Eye Tell (!)"	2022	Songwriter, producer	Jim Legxacy	Non-album single
1. "DJ"	2023	Songwriter, producer	Jim Legxacy	Homeless N*gga Pop Music
2. "Candy Reign (!)"	2023	Songwriter, producer	Jim Legxacy	Homeless N*gga Pop Music
3. "Amnesia111"	2023	Songwriter, producer	Jim Legxacy	Homeless N*gga Pop Music
4. "Mileys Riddim"	2023	Songwriter, producer	Jim Legxacy	Homeless N*gga Pop Music
5. "Eye Tell (!)"	2023	Songwriter, producer	Jim Legxacy	Homeless N*gga Pop Music
6. "Old Place"	2023	Songwriter, producer	Jim Legxacy	Homeless N*gga Pop Music
7. "Block Hug"	2023	Songwriter, co-producer (with Kare & TRTheProducer)	Jim Legxacy	Homeless N*gga Pop Music
8. "Ur Marges Crib"	2023	Songwriter, producer	Jim Legxacy	Homeless N*gga Pop Music
9. "Fake Smiles"	2023	Songwriter, co-producer (with Phil)	Jim Legxacy	Homeless N*gga Pop Music
10. "Call Ur Dad"	2023	Songwriter, co-producer (with Phil & Fil Yonder)	Jim Legxacy	Homeless N*gga Pop Music
11. "Homeless Nigga Pop Music"	2023	Songwriter, producer	Jim Legxacy	Homeless N*gga Pop Music
12. "Hit It Light It Twist It"	2023	Songwriter, producer	Jim Legxacy	Homeless N*gga Pop Music
"Sprinter"	2023	Songwriter, co-producer (with Dave, Kyle Evans, Jonny Leslie, Jo Caleb & TR The Producer)	Dave & Central Cee	Split Decision
6. "Form 696"	2024	Songwriter, co-producer (with M1OnTheBeat & King Wizard)	Headie One	The Last One
7."Recall/Why You Look so Tired"	2024	Songwriter, co-producer (with M1OnTheBeat, Ka7ton8, NatsGotTracks & TR The Producer)	Headie One	The Last One
1. "Context"	2025	Songwriter, co-producer (with Lucid)	Jim Legxacy	Black British Music (2025)
2. "Stick"	2025	Songwriter, co-producer (with Stanley)	Jim Legxacy	Black British Music (2025)
3. "New David Bowie"	2025	Songwriter, co-producer (with BoyRed, Cppo & Baby Cashy)	Jim Legxacy	Black British Music (2025)
4. "Sun"; (with Fimiguerrero)	2025	Songwriter, co-producer (with Lucid, Stanley, Fumez, Rahitsbkay, Hamilton & Cole YoursTruly)	Jim Legxacy	Black British Music (2025)
6. "Issues of Trust" Olaloye	2025	Songwriter, co-producer (with Stanley)	Jim Legxacy	Black British Music (2025)
7. "Father"	2025	Songwriter, co-producer (with Baby Cashy & YT)	Jim Legxacy	Black British Music (2025)
9. "Big Time Forward"	2025	Songwriter, co-producer (with J Moon & Sai on the Beat)	Jim Legxacy	Black British Music (2025)
10. "SOS"	2025	Songwriter, co-producer (with Phil, Nathan, Stanley, Kiri & Jkarri)	Jim Legxacy	Black British Music (2025)
11. "I Just Banged a Snus in Canada Water"	2025	Songwriter, co-producer (with Cppo & Kare)	Jim Legxacy	Black British Music (2025)
12. "Dexters Phone Call"; (with Dexter in the Newsagent)	2025	Songwriter, co-producer (with Stanley, Dre Denim & Fritz!)	Jim Legxacy	Black British Music (2025)
13. "3x"; (featuring Dave)	2025	Songwriter, co-producer (with Stanley, Cppo, Henes & Hoskins)	Jim Legxacy	Black British Music (2025)
14. "Tiger Driver '91"	2025	Songwriter, co-producer (with Stanley & Dre Denim)	Jim Legxacy	Black British Music (2025)
15. "Brief"	2025	Songwriter, co-producer (with Stanley & DameDame*)	Jim Legxacy	Black British Music (2025)
3. "No Weapons"; (featuring Jim Legxacy)	2025	Songwriter, co-producer (with Dave, Jo Caleb, Jonny Leslie, Kyle Evans & .nathan)	Dave	The Boy Who Played the Harp
5. "Raindance"; (featuring Tems)	2025	Additional producer	Dave	The Boy Who Played the Harp

== Awards and nominations ==
Award	Year	Recipient(s) and nominee(s)	Category	Result	Ref.
BBC Radio 1	2026	Himself	Sound of 2026	Runner-up	
Brit Awards	2026	Himself	Best New Artist	Nominated	
Brit Awards	2026	Himself	Best Hip Hop/Grime/Rap Act	Nominated	
Brit Awards	2026	Himself	Best R&B Act	Nominated	
MOBO Awards	2026	Himself	Best Male Act	Won	
MOBO Awards	2026	Himself	Best Newcomer	Nominated	
MOBO Awards	2026	"3x" (with Dave)	Song of the Year	Nominated	
MOBO Awards	2026	"Father"	Video of the Year	Nominated	
