= Charlaine =

Charlaine is a given name. Notable people with this name include the following:

- Charlaine Harris (born 1951), American author
- Charlaine Edith Karalus, birthname of Janet Pilgrim (model) (1934–2017), American model
- Charlaine Woodard, birthname of Charlayne Woodard (born 1953), American playwright and actress

== See also ==
- Charline (name)
- Charmaine (disambiguation)
- Charlayne
