= Claire Smallwood =

American freeskier

Claire Smallwood is an American freeskier as well as executive director and co-founder of SheJumps, a women's outdoor recreation-focused nonprofit organization facilitating the participation of women and girls in outdoor activities through free and low-cost outdoor education. Smallwood was born in Santa Fe, New Mexico to a family of ranchers, entrepreneurs, and farmers. She is a graduate of Lewis & Clark College in Portland, Oregon.

Smallwood founded SheJumps along with professional freeskier Lynsey Dyer and journalist Vanessa Pierce.

At its 2014 Women + Sports Summit, ESPNW awarded her a $10,000 Everyday Heroes grant in recognition of her work.
