= Big Bad Beetleborgs =

1990s American children's superhero television series

- Also known as: Saban's Big Bad Beetleborgs
- Genre: Action/adventure; Comedy horror Science fiction Superhero; Tokusatsu
- Created by: Haim Saban; Shuki Levy; Toei Company
- Based on: Juukou B-Fighter & B-Fighter Kabuto by Toei Company
- Starring: Wesley Barker; Herbie Baez; Shannon Chandler; Brittany Konarzewski; Billy Forester; Vivian Smallwood; Kim Delgado; Elizabeth Z. Lund; Channe Nolen; Christopher Cho; Claudine Barros; Marshal Hilton; Blake Torney; David Fletcher; Joe Hackett; Frank Tahoe; Lina Godouse
- Theme music composer: Jeremy Sweet; Billy Forester
- Composers: Jeremy Sweet; Barry Trop; Inon Zur; Shuki Levy; Kussa Mahchi
- Countries of origin: United States; Japan
- Original language: English
- No. of seasons: 2
- No. of episodes: 88 (list of episodes)

Production
- Executive producers: Haim Saban; Shuki Levy; Lance H. Robbins
- Producer: Robert Hughes
- Production locations: California (Santa Paula & Los Angeles); Japan (Saitama, Kyoto, Yokohama and Tokyo)
- Running time: 30 minutes
- Production companies: Saban Entertainment; Renaissance-Atlantic Films; Toei Company; Bugboy Productions, Inc.

Original release
- Network: FOX (Fox Kids)
- Release: September 7, 1996 – March 2, 1998

Related
- VR Troopers

Big Bad Beetleborgs (later Beetleborgs Metallix for Season 2) is an American live-action superhero television series by Saban Entertainment and was co-produced with Renaissance-Atlantic Films, Toei Company and Bugboy Productions. Two seasons aired on Fox Kids from September 7, 1996, to March 2, 1998.

The series adapted combat footage from the Metal Hero tokusatsu-series Juukou B-Fighter (first season) and B-Fighter Kabuto (second season). Unlike its contemporaries, such as Power Rangers, the show had a greater emphasis on sitcom elements, rather than a villain of the week.

== Synopsis ==
=== Season 1 ===
In the fictional town of Charterville, three kids — Andrew "Drew" McCormick (Wesley Barker), his younger sister Josephine "Jo" McCormick (Shannon Chandler, later Brittany Konarzewski), and their best friend Roland Williams (Herbie Baez) — enter the haunted Hillhurst Mansion after accepting a dare from two rich bullies, Van and Trip. They discover that the mansion is inhabited by actual monsters who intend to eat them. In the midst of a chase, the kids accidentally bump into a pipe organ, releasing a phasm named Flabber (Billy Forester), who had been trapped inside of it. Out of gratitude for freeing him, Flabber offers to grant the kids one wish. Their wish is to become their favorite comic book heroes, the Big Bad Beetleborgs, but this also brings the Beetleborgs' archenemies, the Magnavores, into the real world. Throughout the season, the Magnavores' leader, Vexor, summons monsters from the comic books to battle the Beetleborgs.

Later, Vexor creates Shadowborg, who briefly takes away the Beetleborgs' powers, prompting them to ask the comics' creator, Art Fortunes, to create the White Blaster Beetleborg and Drew's new Mega Blue mode to help them. The team later meets a new kid in town, Josh Baldwin (Warren Berkow), who becomes the new Beetleborg and helps the team until he loses his powers after Shadowborg was destroyed.

In the penultimate episode of the first season, the Magnavores steal a picture of a new villain named Nukus from Art Fortunes' office, and bring him to life in hope that he will help them destroy the Beetleborgs, through his creation of Borgslayer, a hybrid of all the Magnavore monsters. Unbeknownst to the Magnavores, Nukus was actually plotting to get rid of them, and tells Trip and Van how to defeat Borgslayer, and orders them to take the information to the Beetleborgs, who succeed in destroying Borgslayer, causing the Magnavores to be swept back into the comics.

=== Season 2 ===
After the Beetleborgs destroy Borgslayer and the Magnavores, Nukus has challenged them. Despite Art's warning that Nukus is too powerful, the Beetleborgs face him anyway, and Nukus quickly wipes them out, destroying their armor, weapons, and powers in one fell swoop.

Nukus soon discovers that his creator is actually Art's incarcerated brother, Les Fortunes. He subsequently busts Les out of prison and uses some of Les' drawings to summon his own group of villains called the Crustaceans. Les now serves Nukus by creating new monsters for him to use. In response, Art creates new powers, armor, vehicles, and weapons, which Flabber then brings to life again for the kids, who rechristen themselves as the Beetleborgs Metallix.

The battle between the Beetleborgs and the Crustaceans would later escalate after the Fortunes brothers dig up a time capsule containing the Lost Comic, a story that both brothers worked on when they were children which featured the Astral Sword that could summon and control the all-mighty Roboborg if one manages to gather the eight Astral Coins. Nukus summons his own evil team of Borgs from the Lost Comic called the Mantrons, while the Beetleborgs are reinforced by the Astral Borgs. After many battles, the Beetleborgs finally get their hands on the Astral Sword and all eight coins, using it to summon Roboborg, who demonstrates his powers by sending the Mantrons back to the Lost Comic.

To fight Roboborg, the Crustaceans eventually created their own giant robot named Boron, while Nukus and Vilor gain upgraded Mega forms. Boron could be summoned and controlled with the Astral Axe. As a response to Nukus' and Vilor's new Mega forms, the Beetleborgs were given an upgrade by Roboborg who fused their Metallix powers with their original powers creating the Mega Spectra Beetleborgs. Vilor's "mega" form did not last long, and he quietly returns to his original look without explanation while Mega Nukus retained his upgraded look.

The series concluded with the Beetleborgs gaining the enemy Boron as an ally, stripping Nukus of his greatest weapon during the fight against Repgillian, while Les Fortunes willingly decides to return to Charterville Prison, disabling his ability to create new monsters out of illustrations.

== Characters ==
=== Beetleborgs ===
- Andrew "Drew" McCormick (portrayed by Wesley Barker) is the Blue Stinger Beetleborg, later the Chromium Gold Beetleborg in the second season, and the leader of the Beetleborgs. He was granted the ability of telekinesis by Flabber, which he activates by nodding his head, and pointing at an object. Drew received an upgrade, Mega Blue Beetleborg, after he used the energy axis that powered Shadowborg on his original armor. After Roboborg arrived, Drew received a new upgrade, Mega Spectra Chromium Gold Beetleborg, after Nukus and Vilor went Mega themselves. His armor was modeled after a male Japanese rhinoceros beetle.
- Roland Williams (portrayed by Herbie Baez) is the Green Hunter Beetleborg, later the Titanium Silver Beetleborg in the second season, and the best friend of the McCormick kids. His family owns the local comic book shop named Zoom Comics, where he, Jo, and Drew usually hang out. He was granted the ability of super speed by Flabber, which he activates by snapping his fingers. After Roboborg arrived, Roland received an upgrade, Mega Spectra Titanium Silver Beetleborg, after Nukus and Vilor went Mega themselves. His armor was modeled after a male stag beetle.
- Josephine "Jo" McCormick (portrayed by Shannon Chandler in episodes 1–39, Brittany Konarzewski for the rest of the series) is the Red Striker Beetleborg and later the Platinum Purple Beetleborg in the second season. She is Drew's younger sister. She was granted the ability of super strength by Flabber, which she activates by cracking her knuckles. After Roboborg arrived, Jo received an upgrade, Mega Spectra Platinum Purple Beetleborg, after Nukus and Vilor went Mega themselves. Her Red Striker armor was modeled after a female Japanese rhinoceros beetle, and her Platinum Purple armor after a ladybug. Jo is often shown wearing a baseball cap backwards. A unique casting change occurred and instead of an official departure removing the character Jo from the cast, when Shannon Chandler left the series, her character remained. In the 39th episode of Season 1, Wolfgang (while playing with a magic book) accidentally cast a spell that caused Jo to change in appearance permanently. Brittany Konarzewski took over Chandler's role in the guise of actually being the original Jo with a new look and voice. To counteract this, Flabber used his magic to make her look and sound the way she always had, but it did not work on anyone who actually watched the spell being cast. Flabber, Drew, Roland, and Jo herself saw Jo in her new appearance, but the Hilhurst monsters as well as everyone else saw her as she looked before. According to Flabber, the spell would eventually wear off, which was never shown in the series.
- Josh Baldwin (portrayed by Warren Berkow) is the White Blaster Beetleborg, and he was granted the ability of invisibility by Flabber, which he activates it by dusting his hands. He was on the team for a very short period of time. The White Blaster Beetleborg was created after Shadowborg, an evil clone of the Beetleborgs, stole their powers. He succeeded in getting their powers back, but it was soon discovered that the White Blaster and Shadowborg were linked in a fashion of yin and yang mainly because the White Blaster powers were created solely to battle Shadowborg, meaning if one was destroyed, the other would lose his power forever. Josh and Drew were rivals for Heather's attention. Josh accompanied the Beetleborgs in the final battle against Shadowborg, where he transformed for the final time. Shadowborg was defeated by Drew (in his Mega Blue Beetleborg form) and due to the link, Josh lost his powers at which point, he returned to a normal life, but has suggested to Art Fortunes that he should include the White Blaster Beetleborg in his later comics alongside the Mega Blue Beetleborg form. It was hinted that Jo had a crush on him. His armour was modeled after a Hercules beetle.

=== Hillhurst Inhabitants ===
An old mansion outside of Charterville had fallen into disrepair since the death of Old Man Hillhurst and became home to some rather goofy monsters. With the exception of Flabber, all the monsters attempt to eat any humans who trespass in their home. As a running gag, they never learn their lesson about trying to go after the Beetleborgs who always manage to outwit or clobber them.

- Flabber (portrayed by Billy Forester) is a phantasm (phasm) who was trapped inside a pipe organ and was freed by the kids. Out of gratitude, he granted their wish to become their comic book heroes, the Big Bad Beetleborgs. This event also unintentionally released the Magnavores. He also acts as an advisor and best friend, and offers needed magic to the kids when fighting the Magnavores and later the Crustaceans, although his magic does not always work the way he might hope. He is the head of the Hillhurst Mansion and is usually the one to keep the house monsters in check by trying to keep them from eating the kids. The producers of the show said that he was based on Elvis Presley.
- Mums (voiced by Michael Sorich in the pilot episode, performed by Blake Torney in later episodes) is a 5,000-year-old Egyptian mummy, who used to be a prince. He can unwrap his bandages to reveal a "Grim Reaper"-like form.
- Frankenbeans (performed by David Fletcher) (called "Frankie" for short) is a strange, lumbering Frankenstein's monster-type monster. He was once kidnapped by the Magnavores on Halloween and held for ransom in exchange for the Beetleborgs' Beetle Bonders. He allows Wolfie to stay in a dog house kept in his room. He has no brain and little ability to speak, often roaring or saying toddler-like sentences. His creator Dr. Baron von Frankenbeans showed up in a few episodes. His name is a play on franks and beans.
- Count Fangula (portrayed by Joe Hackett): Loosely modeled after Count Dracula, Count Fangula is a vampire (albeit one of questionable aptitude in the Dark Arts). He seems to be the only one who can understand what Wolfie may be saying. He mentioned in Wolfie's introductory episode that they were roommates "in the old country".
- The Pipettes (portrayed by Traci Bellusci) are a multicolored spirit-like trio of ladies who live in the pipe organ and they act as Flabber's back-up singers.
- Ghoulum (performed by Dan Letlow) is a living stone statue monster who resides in Hillhurst Mansion and has little to say or do other than what statues do best, stand in place. While not the most active monster of Hillhurst Mansion on rare occasions, he would join in on the other monsters' mischief.
- Wolfgang "Wolfie" Smith (performed by Frank Tahoe, voiced by Michael Sorich in the first appearance, Scott Page-Pagter in later appearances) is a werewolf and is treated more like a family dog than a monster at Hillhurst. Only Fangula can translate what Wolfie is saying most of the time since Fangula was once Wolfie's roommate.
- Little Ghoul (portrayed by Lina Godouse) is a Jawa-like ghoul who was the latest addition to the Hillhurst group in season two. She lives in the basement and rarely comes out. As the niece of the Grim Reaper, Little Ghoul is a grim reaper-in-training who loves collecting. She also has a short temper, which scares the other monsters even more than her true appearance under her hood. She has little to no respect for anyone, but has a great deal of respect for the Astralborgs.

=== Supporting characters ===
- "Nano" Williams (portrayed by Vivian Smallwood) is Roland's paternal grandmother, Aaron's mother, and Abbie's mother-in-law. Nano is one hip granny and a trained martial artist. When she is not running Zoom Comics or practicing her moves, she is often seen riding her motorcycle. Nano often helps out the kids when they are in a jam. If nothing else, she enjoys teasing her son Aaron.
- Aaron Williams (portrayed by Kim Delgado) is Roland's father, Abbie's husband, and Nano's son. He ran Zoom Comics full-time and is often embarrassed by his mother's antics. Aaron was soon called away on business halfway through season one, leaving the shop in the hands of his wife Abbie.
- Abbie Williams (portrayed by Channe Nolen) is Roland's mother, Aaron's wife, and Nano's daughter-in-law. She primarily works as a real estate agent. When her husband Aaron left on business, she assumed running Zoom Comics. She and her mother in-law do not always see eye to eye, and she did not always know how to run a comic book shop. With a little help from Flabber's magic, Abbie's heart opened up and rekindled fond childhood memories of a comic she once loved reading. She ran the shop for the remainder of the series.
- Heather (portrayed by Elizabeth Z. Lund) is Drew's crush. No matter what happened, Drew could never really tell Heather about his feelings for her. She would sometimes help out at the comic shop, and she also enjoyed reading comics. During the Shadowborg saga, she developed a crush on Josh. She stopped appearing early in season two and is never mentioned again.
- Trip and Van (portrayed by Todd Hurst and Patrick Seaborn) are two brothers who come from a rich family, who constantly pester the kids' daily lives by flaunting their wealth and self-acclaimed superiority. Trip was the smarter of the two whereas Van was a bit slow. They often came up with get-rich-quick schemes, ways to humiliate the kids, or simply to cause trouble. They were the ones who dared Jo, Roland, and Drew to enter Hillhurst, which led to them becoming Beetleborgs. During the Borgslayer fiasco, they left town to go live at their father's country estate. Beforehand, Nukus forced them to return to town and tell the Beetleborgs how to defeat Borgslayer in order to get rid of the Magnavores. The two of them stopped appearing after season one and are only mentioned once in season two.
  - Dudley (portrayed by Dudley Davis) is a butler/chauffeur who works for Trip and Van's family. He is unwittingly dragged into Trip and Van's schemes on occasion. Like Trip and Van, Dudley is not seen again after season one.
- Dr. Baron von Frankenbeans (portrayed by Don Altman) is a mad scientist who is based on Victor Frankenstein and is the creator of Frankenbeans. He treated the monsters like servants. Whenever he announced his full name, he would be spotlighted by moonlight as lightning would flash and a wolf would howl outside (even if it was daylight). He first appeared to visit his son and do medical treatment on the monsters. Frankenbeans later helped the Beetleborgs by giving them a suggestion on how to defeat Cyber-Serpent by opening fire on him while he is standing over his comic. In "Operation Frankenbeans", Frankenbeans returned where he implanted a new brain into Frankenbeans when the other Hillhurst monster started to get annoyed with his incompetence and stupidity. While it made Frankenbeans smart, it also made him not see Frankenbeans as his father. This lasted until Frankenbeans fell down the stairs, hit his head, and go back to his original intellect. In "Bride of Frankenbeans", Frankenbeans returned where he had assembled a mate for Frankenbeans (who was based on the Bride of Frankenstein). Even though the Beetleborgs stopped Crimson Creep from crashing the wedding, Frankenbeans' relationship with the "bride" was short and she was deactivated and dismantled by Frankenbeans. In "Son of Frankenbeans", Dr. Frankenbeans returns, having created a "brother" for the younger Frankenbeans. In "Experiment of Evil", Frankenbeans creates the "Monster Mother: Root of all Evil" for the Hillhurst monster who wanted to end the danger posed to their home. He claims that in order to defeat evil, one must be eviler.
- Arthur "Art" Fortunes (portrayed by Rigg Kennedy) is the creator of the Beetleborgs comics who shows up time and time again with new ways to help the kids since the Shadowborg fiasco. He often collaborates with Flabber's magic to bring new arsenal to the kids. Art Fortunes has a brother named Les Fortunes where they had a sibling rivalry. When they were young, Art and Les had a brief collaboration on the "Lost Comic" where Art created the Astralborgs and Les created the Mantrons. A running gag is that the Hillhurst monsters focus on trying to eat him instead of the kids when they are out fighting the villains.
- Karato and Silver Ray (voiced by an uncredited Richard Epcar and Lex Lang) are two other comic book superheroes who the kids are fans of and are stated to be good Beetleborgs monsters. When the Magnavores released an army of monsters while trying to kidnap Art Fortunes from a comic book convention, the Beetleborgs were afraid of being unable to beat them all by themselves. Flabber agreed to use his magic on just that one occasion to summon other superheroes from the comics to help.
- Astralborgs are four heroes of the Lost Comic who were created by Art Fortunes and Les Fortunes. When the Beetleborgs acquired their coins, they are able to summon the Astralborgs to help them fight Nukus' forces.
  - Dragonborg (voiced by Doug Stone impersonating Sean Connery): Modeled after a dragonfly, Dragonborg is the leader of the Astralborgs. His astral laser comes with a powerful sting.
  - Fireborg (voiced by Gene Holliday) is an Astralborg who is modeled after a firefly. He can shoot balls of fire from his fingertips.
  - Lightingborg (voiced by Richard Epcar) is an Astralborg who is modeled after a cicada. He can shoot electrical currents from the blades of his two swords or the antennae on his helmet.
  - Ladyborg (voiced by Barbara Goodson) is an Astralborg who is modeled after a butterfly. Her large cannon opens up like a flower to fire a powerful beam.

=== Villains ===
==== Magnavores ====
The Magnavores (2–53) are the first set of villains the Beetleborgs faced, who originated from the Beetleborgs comic series. They were released due to Flabber granting the kids' wish which unintentionally released them. While in Charterville, the Magnavores use the old Charterville cemetery as their lair. By the end of Season One, the Magnavores are sent back into the comics as a side effect of Borgslayer's destruction.

- Vexor (first performed by Rick Tane and later by Kisu, voiced by Joseph Pilato) is the leader of the Magnavores. He loses patience with his Magnavores' incompetence and does not appear in every episode. He appeared to have been destroyed by the combined efforts of all three Beetleborgs stabbing their Beetle Battlers into his body and pulling him to the ground, after Drew battled with and destroyed Shadowborg, but quickly revived himself, sprouting a new body and face and even managed to grow giant. In his following appearance, he somehow switched back to his old self/appearance.
- Typhus (performed by Kyle Jordan, voiced by Dave "Foots" Footman) is a Chimera-like humanoid monster with a blue whale-like flattop, clam-like shoulders, and a left frog-like leg. He prefers brawn over brain and his blue whale-like flattop is an extra mouth with which he eats food or other objects. In battle, he sometimes wields a sword-like weapon that latches to his arm or his mouth. This weapon can also blast lasers when latched to his extra mouth. On one occasion, he emitted bees from his extra mouth. He was temporarily turned into Mega Typhus who had horns, clam-like features, and a left crab-like claw.
- Noxic (performed by Lee Whey, voiced by Steve Prince) is an android with coils for hair who wears a white labcoat-like jacket. He can control machinery and other objects by removing his head and attaching it to them. In a dream of his, Noxic took control of a bulldozer with his head and tried to destroy the Beetleborgs. He later used this same technique to take control of Ghoulum, when he went bad from the "Bad Potion". He has an unseen wicked friend from the comic books as well named Dr. Cackle who created the Bad Potion. Noxic prefers to eat donuts all day long instead of doing Vexor's bidding. He has an older brother named Super Noxic, though technically Noxic was created first. In battle, he sometimes wields an umbrella-like weapon.
- Jara (performed by Balinda English in U.S. Footage, voiced by Rajia Baroudi) is a female humanoid clad in red attire and a white mask who speaks with a Russian accent. Despite her face being remade 3-dimensional, she cannot consume food or smile in the real world because the mouth on her mask could never open (she emphasizes this by saying that she has no mouth). Jara sometimes wields a whip that when cracked releases destructive energy.
- Shadowborg (voiced by Bob Papenbrook) (26–31) is an evil, black Beetleborg created by Vexor from ionic DNA and insectite material stolen from the Blue Stinger Beetleborg's armor. Not only is Shadowborg created from the basic materials as Blue Stinger, but he is enhanced with some of the powers of the other Beetleborgs. Shadowborg can run faster than the Green Hunter, jump higher than Red Striker, and remain underwater for 51 minutes. Shadowborg's architectural armor is modeled after a longhorn beetle. With his Shadow Claw, Shadowborg can cut through any substance known to the planet. He was finally destroyed by the Blue Stinger Beetleborg in his Mega Blue Form.
- Scabs (3–53) are a yellow-black creatures who are the foot soldiers of the Magnavores. Unlike in most Saban adaptations, these grunt soldiers were barely used.
- Magnavore Jet Fighters (3–53) are air-borne, wasp-resembling machine jets, who are summoned to attack the Beetleborgs on several occasions.
- Magnavores' Monsters are the monsters who came from the Beetleborgs comics and are brought out by the Magnavores.
  - Borgslayer (simultaneously voiced by Bob Papenbrook and Dave Mallow) is the final monster of Season One. After Nukus was brought to life, he brought out 14 previous Beetleborgs monsters from their respective issues. After Kombat Gnat and Dicehead were defeated by the Beetleborgs, Nukus fused the energies harvested from the monsters that he then sent back to the comics and the Beetleborgs' lasers together to create Borgslayer to battle the Beetleborgs. Borgslayer resembled a composite monster with Hypnomaniac's head and the faces of Shadowborg and several monsters on its head, torso, and arms. Borgslayer proved to be too powerful as he destroyed Gargantis with little to no trouble while the Magnavore Jet Fighters destroyed the Beetle Battle Base and all 3 A.V.'s. The only way to defeat Borgslayer was for the Beetleborgs to triangulate their firepower. By doing so, Borgslayer was finished and the residual energy from the explosion managed to suck all the Magnavores and Vexor back into the comic book world forever.

==== Crustaceans ====
The Crustaceans (52–88) are villains created by Les Fortunes and the second set of villains the Beetleborgs faced. After the Magnavores were defeated, the "Crustaceans" used the old Charterville cemetery as their lair.

- Nukus (performed and voiced by Christopher Cho) (52–81): A creation of Les Fortunes, Nukus is the Triceratops-based Overlord of the 2nd Dimension. His drawing was hidden away in Art Fortune's vault until the Magnavores took the picture and Vexor brought him to life, but Nukus quickly set a plan to dispose the Magnavores and take over as the new villain by creating Borgslayer. After Borgslayer was destroyed and the Magnavores returned to the comics, Nukus went to confront the Beetleborgs, destroying both the paper he came out of and the Beetleborgs' original armor, weapons, and powers. When he raided Hillhurst, Nukus turned Flabber into ice and discovered Art Fortunes with another picture of Nukus which was actually drawn by his brother Les. With this knowledge, Nukus broke Les out of prison, brought Horribelle, Vilor, and the Dregs to life, and used Les' skills to create deadly monsters that could be brought to life with the use of his sword where he would say the name of Les' creation and quote "Arise" where the drawing came to life. He later gained a mega form called Mega Nukus (81–88) from touching Les Fortunes' transmographier device which he destroyed soon after to ensure no one else received an upgrade from it.
- Horribelle (performed and voiced by Claudine Barros) (54–88) is a sword-toting insectoid-armored fighter and Nukus' right-hand woman who was brought to life by Nukus from Les' drawing of her. Like Nukus, she can summon a face-mask in battle. She also wields two swords that resemble mantis arms. Horribelle once rebelled against the Crustaceans by having Les Fortunes create the Astral Axe so she could control its powers out of a scorn for not receiving a mega form like the main male villains.
- Vilor (performed by Kyle Jordan, voiced by Dave "Foots" Footman) (54–88) is a anglerfish-based and trident-toting fighter created by Les in prison and brought to life by Nukus. Vilor briefly gains a second form called Super Vilor, who wields a trident. Then he would later gain a brief megaform called Mega Vilor who sported a small torso, a white mask, and a black cape.
- Lester "Les" Fortunes (portrayed by Marshal Hilton) (54–88) is the black sheep in the Fortunes family and Art's older brother who has the same artistic talents as his brother. When they were young, Les and Art had a brief collaboration on the "Lost Comic" where Art created the Astralborgs and Les created the Mantrons. Les was responsible for drawing the picture of Nukus which the Magnavores brought to life. He was serving time in prison when Nukus recruited him to his cause. Despite creating the Crustacean monsters and their arsenal, Les never gets any respect or credit for it. After Repgillian's destruction, Les and Nukus part ways after the former decides to return to prison for "peace and quiet".
- Mantrons (75–82) are an evil counterparts of the Astralborgs. Created by Les Fortunes as a child to rival Art Fortunes' Astralborgs in their only collaboration the Lost Comic, they were there to aid Nukus in his plans to get Roboborg who ultimately made it to the good hands of the Beetleborgs. In "Roboborg" (part 8 of the Lost Comic saga), the Mantrons were finally sent back to the Lost Comic for good by the combined attacks of the Beetleborgs, Astralborgs, and Roboborg.
  - Scorpix (voiced by Bob Papenbrook): Modeled after a scorpion, Scorpix is the leader of the Mantrons.
  - Centipix (voiced by Lee Hondo Woodford) is a Mantron who is modeled after a centipede.
  - Mantix (voiced by Ezra Weisz) is a Mantron who is modeled after a mantis.
  - Hornix (voiced by Neil Kaplan) is a Mantron who is modeled after a hornet.
- Dregs (55–88) are an assorted monsters who were created by Les Fortunes and brought to life by Nukus. Dregs came in two groups. One group was based on land animals and wore brown slacks and black boots (consisting of the Ptera Dreg, the Spider Dreg, and the Stego Dreg). The other was based on sea creatures and wore blue spandex pants and white boots (consisting of the Fish Dreg, Jellyfish Dreg, and Squid Dreg).
- Worm Tanks (55–88) are giant worm-like vehicles summoned to attack the Beetleborgs on several occasions.
- Crustacean Jet Fighters (56–88) are air-borne machines based on the design of the Worm Tank summoned to attack the Beetleborgs on several occasions.
- Crustaceans' Monsters are a monsters who are drawn up by Les Fortunes and brought to life by Nukus.
  - Repgillian (voiced by Anne Britt Makebakken) is the final monster that the Beetleborgs faced. Repgillian was created from mixing toxic chemicals, Les' old drawings (consisting of Changeling, Fernzilla, Torch Mouth, Ultra Vulture, and Triplesaurus Rex), and Nukus' powers. When sent to Charterville, the monster attacked the city in its giant size. This reptilian creature was more powerful than anything the Beetleborgs had ever faced and even Roboborg had trouble when he fought her. In a last-ditch effort, Roland stole the Astral Ax from the Crustaceans and called on Boron, which subsequently caused Boron to switch sides and join the Beetleborgs' side. It took the combination of the Mega Spectra Beetleborgs, Roboborg, and Boron to finally destroy Repgillian.

== Production ==
Like other adaptations produced by Saban Entertainment, some of the original source footage was altered for Beetleborgs. The Input Magnums, the original B-Fighters' guns, were changed to the Sonic Lasers and were colored bright red and purple, due to how the Input Magnums looked very realistic, but the colors of the guns changed from time to time due to the blending in of the B-Fighter footage. In Metallix, the Data Laser's colors remained unchanged (silver and black), but the toyline changed the weapons to a white-and-blue color scheme. More violent scenes from B-Fighter were either covered up with large, Batman-esque sound effects or were cut out through comic-book-panel transitions.

Big Bad Beetleborgs and Beetleborgs Metallix ended after the Saban crew were left with no more Juukou B-Fighter and B-Fighter Kabuto footage to adapt. Their predecessor VR Troopers also ended for the same reason.

=== Music ===
The show's theme music was performed by Jeremy Sweet and series star Billy Forester. A newer version of the song was made for the Beetleborgs Metallix episodes. The background score was credited to Shuki Levy and Haim Saban (under the alias Kussa Mahchi). It had compositions written by Inon Zur (only credited as a music producer), who had just joined Saban Entertainment. Several of the show's compositions were also used on Saban's concurrent Power Rangers Turbo (1997). Currently, Beetleborgs has never had any official soundtrack releases.

=== Filming locations ===
The show was filmed in a number of locations. Much of the show was filmed in Santa Paula, California, a small rural town in Ventura County.

== Power Rangers Turbo vs. Beetleborgs Metallix ==
In 1997, Acclaim Comics published a one-shot entitled Power Rangers Turbo vs. Beetleborgs Metallix featuring the Beetleborgs battling the Turbo Rangers before teaming with them against Divatox and Nukus.

== Release history ==
After ending a two-season run on the Fox network, the series was rerun on UPN Kids from 1998 to 1999. In Australia, Big Bad Beetleborgs began airing on Network Ten's Cheez TV morning block during February 1998. In Europe, the series aired on the international version of Fox Kids, which was later rebranded as Jetix. It was aired on GMA Network in the Philippines from 1997 to 1999. In 2010, as part of the sale of the Power Rangers franchise, the copyright for Beetleborgs was transferred from BVS Entertainment to Saban Capital Group. In 2018, the rights were transferred to Hasbro, as part of the acquisition of the Power Rangers brand, which included related intellectual property and content libraries previously owned by Saban Properties.

In 2011, all episodes of Big Bad Beetleborgs and Beetleborgs Metallix were made available on Netflix until February 1, 2021.

There have been three VHS releases in the US and Australia: The Curse of Shadow Borg, The Vampire Files, and Metallix – The Movie. They were all released by 20th Century Fox Home Entertainment.

Shout! Factory began putting the series out on DVD with the October 16, 2012 release of Beetleborgs: Season 1, Part 1. Season 1, Part 2 was released on February 12, 2013 and was followed by Season 2, Part 1 on June 11. Season 2, Part 2 was released on May 5, 2015.

The series was added to Plex in 2025.

DVD name	Ep #	Release date
Beetleborgs: Season 1, Part 1	27	October 16, 2012
Beetleborgs: Season 1, Part 2	26	February 12, 2013
Beetleborgs: Season 2, Part 1	18	June 11, 2013
Beetleborgs: Season 2, Part 2	17	May 5, 2015
