= List of Big Bad Beetleborgs episodes =

Big Bad Beetleborgs (later Beetleborgs Metallix) is an American live-action television series by Saban Entertainment and was co-produced with Renaissance-Atlantic Films, Toei Company and Bugboy Productions. It originally aired on Fox Kids. It premiered on September 7, 1996 and ended on March 2, 1998, with a total of 88 episodes over the course of two seasons.

== Series overview ==
Season	Episodes	Originally released	
Season	Episodes	First released	Last released
1	53	September 7, 1996	May 20, 1997
2	35	September 8, 1997	March 2, 1998

== Episodes ==
=== Season 1 (1996–97): Big Bad Beetleborgs ===
No. overall	No. in season	Title	Directed by	Written by	Original release date
1	1	"Beetle Rock"	Shuki Levy	Shell Danielson, Shuki Levy	September 7, 1996
2	2	"Beetle Rock"	Shuki Levy	Shell Danielson, Shuki Levy	September 7, 1996
Drew, Roland, and Jo are hanging out at Zoom Comics when local bullies Van and Trip dare them to go into the old abandoned Hillhurst House. The three kids free Flabber from his organ, and are each granted one wish. They choose to become their favorite comic book heroes, the Beetleborgs, but now have to deal with the evil Magnavores that have escaped from the comic book world.
3	3	"TNT for Two"	John Putch	M.A. Evans	September 9, 1996
Van and Trip hire a demolition company to destroy Hillhurst, while the Magnavores send Jet Fighters to attack the Beetleborgs.
4	4	"The Ghost is Toast"	John Putch	Margo McCahon	September 10, 1996
Van and Trip hire a phasm hunter to take out Flabber. To help out, the Magnavores call out the monster Terror Bear, a mace-wielding monster with a surprising sweet tooth, to destroy the Beetleborgs.
5	5	"The Treasure of Hillhurst Mansion"	John Putch	Paul Corrigan, Brad Walsh	September 11, 1996
Flabber's handkerchief is discovered to be a treasure map, which is fought for by the Hillhurst monsters, Van and Trip, and the Magnavores. To give them an edge over the hunt, the Magnavores call in the Green Cannon Machine to get rid of the competition.
6	6	"Never Cry Werewolf"	Gabe Torres	M.A. Evans	September 12, 1996
Wolfgang appears in town, and the Magnavores try to bring him towards their side.
7	7	"Say the Magic Word"	John Putch	Paul Corrigan, Brad Walsh	September 13, 1996
Trying to teach Drew magic, Jo is accidentally turned invisible by Flabber's spell book. Using this to their advantage, the Magnavores call in the samurai themed Sword Warrior monster to destroy the Beetleborgs.
8	8	"Lights, Camera, Too Much Action"	Gabe Torres	Jennifer Heftler, Lisa Page	September 14, 1996
A moviemaker wants to use Hillhurst for a horror movie, and an insect monster sent by the Magnavores, Graxxis lands the monster role.
9	9	"Nano in the House"	John Putch	Clifford Herbert	September 16, 1996
Nano finds an amulet which causes all who see it to become slaves to the holder, including the Hillhurst monsters, but the original owner of the amulet, LottaMuggs from the comics, wants it back.
10	10	"Locomotion Commotion"	John Putch	Taylor Grant	September 17, 1996
The Magnavores want to sabotage a train station, so Vexor orders Garganturat to kidnap Heather so she can be his bride.
11	11	"Cat-tastrophy"	Worth Keeter	Margo McCahon	September 18, 1996
Drew gets his DNA altered with that of a cat monster, Firecat, and slowly begins to turn into a werecat and loses the ability to become the Blue Stinger Beetleborg. Now the others have to not only get Drew back to normal, but also have to prevent Firecat from becoming even stronger.
12	12	"Drew and Flabber's Less Than Fabulous Adventure"	Worth Keeter	Bob Allen	September 19, 1996
Drew wishes to get an amulet from a comic book for Heather, who he has a crush on, so he and Flabber go into the comic to attempt to capture it from Queen Magna. The Magnavores see this as a golden opportunity to get rid of the Beetleborgs by trapping Drew and Flabber inside the comic, and attacking with a squad of Jet Fighters. Fortunately for Jo and Roland, Drew returns with the Gartantis the Attack Mobile Carrier.
13	13	"Ghouls Just Wanna Have Fun"	Worth Keeter	Jennifer Heftler, Lisa Page	September 20, 1996
A Magnavore spy known as Monsterella is sent to Hillhurst to go undercover as a maid.
14	14	"It's a Bad, Bad, Bad, Bad World"	Doug Campbell	M.A. Evans	September 21, 1996
Jo is turned into a Mr. Hyde-like monster by a Magnavore chemical.
15	15	"The Hunchback of Hillhurst"	Doug Campbell	Taylor Grant	September 23, 1996
The star quarterback of University of Notre Dame, who is also a hunchback, gets amnesia and winds up in the Hillhurst attic.
16	16	"The Littlest Brattleborg"	Doug Campbell	Paul Corrigan, Brad Walsh	September 27, 1996
Drew and Jo's cousin Oliver shows up in town, and is later kidnapped when Noxic of the Magnavores mistakes his costume for a real Beetleborg. Inspired by the boy's obsession with taking pictures, Vexor calls in Photominator to destroy the Beetleborgs.
17	17	"Haunted Hideout"	Terence H. Winkless	Margo McCahon	September 28, 1996
Two bank robbers attempt to hide in Hillhurst, but Flabber gives them a taste of his own justice. Meanwhile the Magnavores bring the Mace Warrior monster from the comics to life, and causes a forest fire to destroy Hillhurst Manor.
18	18	"Monster Rock"	Terence H. Winkless	Koji Kataoka, Oak O'Connor	October 4, 1996
The rock band Torpedo tries practicing new tunes in Hillhurst and gets an unexpected inspiration when the monsters mess with their instruments. Inspired, the Magnavores call on Amphead to wreck the town.
19	19	"Convention Dimension"	Terence H. Winkless	M.A. Evans	October 5, 1996
The Beetleborgs go to a comic book convention where Beetleborgs creator Art Fortunes will be making an appearance, while Vexor plans to have him kidnapped. With the kids present, Vexor calls in an assortment of monsters, Wingar, Cataclazmic, and Goldex to hold them off. Realizing the kids need back up, Flabber calls in Karato and Silver Ray to help out.
20	20	"Root of All Evil"	Gabe Torres	Toni Gallagher	October 11, 1996
Flabber creates an intelligent plant for the kids to use in their science project. Seeing the plant's potential, Vexor calls in the Venus Claptrap monster to steal it.
21	21	"The Doctor Is In"	Gabe Torres	David Fletcher	October 18, 1996
Frankenbeans' creator Dr. Baron Von Frankenbeans visits Hillhurst and tries to "fix" Frankenbeans' friend. Meanwhile, a seemingly invincible snake monster, Cyber-Serpant, whose weakness may not be found out until next month's issue, is unleashed to wreak havoc.
22	22	"Space Case"	Jeff Burr	M.A. Evans	October 19, 1996
Aliens arrive at Hillhurst and disguise themselves as reporters to interview the monsters, who they mistake for humans.
23	23	"The Brain in the Attic"	Jeff Burr	Margo McCahon	October 25, 1996
The brain of the monster Dicehead is placed in the Hillhurse attic, causing whoever is holding it long enough to receive their worst nightmare. The Beetleborgs need to keep it away from Dicehead or risk fighting a far more intelligent monster.
24	24	"Bye, Bye Frankie"	Gabe Torres	Joel M. Barkow, Louis J. Zivot	October 31, 1996
Frankenbeans escapes into town on Halloween night, so the kids go off to bring him back. Seeing the opportunity, Vexor calls in Grenade Guy to capture Frankenbeans first.
25	25	"Fangs Over Charterville"	Jeff Burr	Bob Allen	November 2, 1996
After several failed attempts, Count Fangula finally catches the constantly invading Van and Trip and turns them into vampires. Now not only do the kids have to turn Trip and Van back to normal, but they also have to deal with the hungry Porkasaurus monster.
26	26	"Curse of the Shadowborg (Part 1)"	Gabe Torres	M.A. Evans	November 11, 1996
Using a piece of the Blue Stinger Beetleborg's armor, Vexor creates the sinister Shadowborg, his own Beetleborg. During their first fight, Shadowborg quickly overpowers the Beetleborgs, and steals their powers, turning them into gems.
27	27	"The Rise of the Blaster Borg (Part 2)"	Gabe Torres	Margo McCahon	November 12, 1996
The Beetleborg powers are stolen by Shadowborg and the kids seek out Art Fortunes for help. After convincing, Art decides to create a White Blaster Beetleborg.
28	28	"The Revenge of Vexor (Part 3)"	Gabe Torres	Elizabeth Cooper	November 13, 1996
The new kid in Charterville, Josh Baldwin, is asked to become the new White Blaster Beetleborg.
29	29	"A Friend in Need (Part 4)"	Gabe Torres	Margo McCahon	November 14, 1996
Josh recaptures the stolen Beetleborgs' powers, but feels he cannot handle being a Beetleborg himself. He might be their only hope, however, when Drew's new Thunder Stinger weapon cannot help the Beetleborgs deal with a legion of their previously defeated foes.
30	30	"Raiders of the Tomb (Part 5)"	John Putch	J.P. Chanda, Peter Lebow	November 15, 1996
Jo discovers the Magnavores' secret hideout in the Charterville cemetery, so Drew and Josh break in to try to find Shadowborg's power source, Vexor's energy Axis. The duo steal it, only to fight the monster Detestro, forcing Drew to use the Axis on himself to become the Mega Blue Beetleborg.
31	31	"Big Rumble in Charterville (Part 6)"	John Putch	M.A. Evans	November 16, 1996
After gaining new powers from Vexor's power device, Drew uses them in his battle against Shadowborg, which not only destroys him, but also depowers Josh as his powers were only meant to destroy Shadowborg.
32	32	"Yo Ho Borgs"	Douglas Sloan	Joel M. Barkow, Louis J. Zivot	November 25, 1996
Flabber brings Blackbeard the pirate into the present to help with the kids' history project. Learning of this, the Magnavores call in Cataclaws to impersonate the famous pirate.
33	33	"Christmas Bells and Phasm's Spells"	Gabe Torres	Shell Danielson	December 21, 1996
While the kids help Flabber celebrate Christmas for the first time, the Magnavores engage in some classic Yuletise villainy by attempting to steal Christmas.
34	34	"Pet Problems"	Douglas Sloan	Taylor Grant	March 21, 1997
Wolfgang is given a large purple fanged pet for his birthday. Meanwhile, the Magnavores release Mucant to steal people's dogs for ransom.
35	35	"Phantom of Hillhurst"	Douglas Sloan	Joel M. Barkow, Louis J. Zivot	March 27, 1997
An old friend of Flabber's, The Phantom, intends to kidnap Jo, who resembles his long lost love, and make her his new singing student.
36	36	"Operation Frankenbeans"	John Putch	David Fletcher	March 28, 1997
Dr. Baron Von Frankenbeans, Frankie's creator, returns, and gives his "son" an operation to increase his intelligence, but it also turns him into an unbearable snob. Meanwhile, Vexor uses a new strategy to defeat the Beetleborgs: keeping them too busy fighting so they will neglect their schoolwork and fail, with help from the moth like Furocious.
37	37	"The Curse of Mums' Tomb"	John Putch	Joel M. Barkow, Louis J. Zivot	April 3, 1997
Two archaeologists who were responsible for awakening Mums from eternal slumber many years ago beg him to remove the curse he gave them. Wanting the curse for themselves, the Magnavores call in the android swordsman Skullhead to get it.
38	38	"This Old Ghost"	John Putch	M.A. Evans	April 4, 1997
The ghost of Old Man Hillhurst loses his peace and quiet in the grave (naturally due to Magnavore monster Malvax with his poor trumpet playing skills) and returns to his mansion, but first tries to get rid of its current inhabitants.
39	39	"Jo's Strange Change"	Brian Thomas Jones	J.P. Chanda, Peter Lebow	April 10, 1997
Jo falls victim to Flabber's spell book, as Wolfgang casts an permanent appearance-altering spell on her. Meanwhile, the monsters quarrel over who is the scariest, and the Magnavore monster Hammerhands to take down the team. This episode marks Shannon Chandler's last appearance as Jo.
40	40	"She Wolf"	Brian Thomas Jones	M.A. Evans	April 11, 1997
Wolfgang turns Jara into a werewolf and the two go out to terrorize Charterville, prompting the kids to bring them in. From this point on Brittany Konarzewski would take over the role of Jo.
41	41	"Something Fishy"	Worth Keeter	Clifford Herbert, Elizabeth Cooper	April 17, 1997
The kids believe that a local legend of a fish creature, known as Charterville Charlie, is running loose, and are hesitant do destroy it, thinking it would be a huge scientific discovery. Roland, however, quickly learns that Charlie is actually the Swamp Scumoid monster from the newest issue of the comics.
42	42	"Bride of Frankenbeans"	Brian Thomas Jones	Joel M. Barkow, Louis J. Zivot	April 18, 1997
Doctor Frankenbeans plans to entitle his fortune to his "son", if he marries the bride he built for him, but the bride is only interested in his money. To crash the wedding, Vexor calls in the Crimson Creep monster.
43	43	"Fangula's Last Bite"	Worth Keeter	Clifford Herbert	April 21, 1997
Fangula falls out of favor from Vlad, the Commissioner of Vampires for failing to create more vampires and may be taken back to where he came from, but Unctous, the crab like monster, is called in to kidnap Vlad.
44	44	"The Good, the Bad, and the Scary"	Worth Keeter	Bob Allen	April 25, 1997
A spell causes the Beetleborgs and Magnavores to become mind-swapped (Roland=Typhus, Drew=Noxic, Jo=Jara). As the Beetleborgs now, Jara, Noxic and Thypus use the Beetleborg powers to wreak havoc, especially with help from the improved Super Grenade Guy monster.
45	45	"Buggin' Out"	Gabe Torres	M.A. Evans	April 28, 1997
Flabber finds a sketch of a transportation device left behind by Art Fortunes, and decides to take it for a test run. Things go awry when the device causes him to fuse with Vexor's insect monster, Kombat Gnat. The Beetleborgs are faced with a difficult dilemma: let Charterville get destroyed by Kombat Gnat or fight Kombat Gnat (which means having to fight Flabber) and risk losing Flabber forever. Kombat Gnat is destroyed and sent back by the Beetleborgs' weapons, but Flabber somehow survives, much to the happy surprise of the kids and Hillhurst monsters.
46	46	"Svengali, By Golly"	Gabe Torres	Joel M. Barkow, Louis J. Zivot	May 2, 1997
After failing to capture Flabber, Jara, Noxic, and Thypus are cast out of Vexor's services, while a hypnotist monster, Hypnomanic (voiced by Joe Ochman), is taken out of the comic book to find new recruits.
47	47	"Big Bad Luck"	Gabe Torres	Koji Kataoka, Oak O'Connor	May 5, 1997
The Magnavores and the cycloid Evil Eye monster torment the Hillhurst monsters with a machine that causes several misfortunes.
48	48	"A Monster is Born"	Worth Keeter	J.P. Chanda, Peter Lebow	May 9, 1997
The Monsters find a baby on the steps of Hillhurst, driving them mad, but the baby is the Rocket Man monster, looking to destroy the Beetleborgs.
49	49	"Norman Nussbaum: Vampire Hunter"	Worth Keeter	David Fletcher	May 12, 1997
A young boy who comes from many generations of vampire hunters goes after Fangula. Meanwhile, the Magnavores pull out all the stops to destroy the Beetleborgs.
50	50	"Brotherly Fright"	Worth Keeter	Joel M. Barkow, Louis J. Zivot	May 16, 1997
Noxic's brother Super Noxic (voiced by Steve Prince) shows up at Hillhurse disguised to be a fitness trainer named Hurt-ules.
51	51	"Fright Files"	James Mathers	M.A. Evans	May 19, 1997
An author of children's books visits Hillhurst for inspiration, until he himself is transformed into a monster. Meanwhile, Typhus uses Vexor's new device to transform into Super Typhus.
52	52	"Borgslayer! (Part 1)"	James Mathers	Margo McCahon	May 20, 1997
A year after the three children became Beetleborgs, Flabber is re-imprisoned in the organ, and the Magnavores find the monster Nukus in Art Fortune's office. Nukus immediately takes charge of a full-blown attack which involves bringing back all the previously destroyed monsters and fusing them all into the lumbering Borgslayer (voiced by Bob Papenbrook and Dave Mallow).
53	53	"Vexor's Last Laugh (Part 2)"	James Mathers	Margo McCahon	May 21, 1997
The Beetleborgs' luck changes when Flabber is re-released, but Nukus' plans have robbed the Beetleborgs of the AVs and Gartantis. Unbeknownst to anyone, Nukus tells Trip and Van how to destroy Borgslayer, which also sends the Magnavores back to the comics too. At the end of the episode, Nukus arrives at Hillhurst to fight the Beetleborgs himself, against Art's wishes.

=== Season 2 (1997–98): Beetleborgs Metallix ===
No. overall	No. in season	Title	Directed by	Written by	Original release date
54	1	"Crush of the Crustaceans (Part 3)"	James Mathers	Margo McCahon	September 8, 1997
Nukus destroys the Beetleborgs' armor, weapons, and powers, and turns Flabber into ice. While the kids try to persuade Art Fortunes to draw new armor, weapons, and powers for them, Nukus frees Fortunes' twisted brother Les from jail and summons some of Les' drawn monsters into the real world.
55	2	"Metallix Rising (Part 4)"	James Mathers	Margo McCahon	September 9, 1997
Nukus, along with new fellow villains Vilor and Horribelle and the Dregs, takes Les Fortunes to the Charterville Cemetery, in order to have a new army of monsters drawn for him. Back at Hillhurst, the kids eventually manage to save Flabber (after they discover a useful spell that can turn them into beetles), who uses some creativity from Art Fortunes to grant them their new Metallix powers. The new Beetleborgs Metallix confront Nukus, but the newly drawn Worm Tanks cause some serious trouble for them.
56	3	"Battle Station Alert (Part 5)"	James Mathers	Margo McCahon	September 10, 1997
The Crustaceans kidnap Art Fortunes, but the kids use the Bug Out spell to sneak into the Charterville Cemetery and rescue him. Art then draws a new Battle Station and new Battle Vehicles so that the Beetleborgs will be able to face the Worm Tanks and the Crustacean Jet Fighters that Les drew for Nukus. For this episode and beyond, the new villains, Les Fortunes, and the Hillhurst Monsters are now credited in the opening titles, which utilize a brand new logo as well as a brand new theme song.
57	4	"Ghoul Trouble"	John Putch	M.A. Evans	September 11, 1997
A mysterious presence disrupts the harmony in Hillhurst, as it steals Flabber's precious spellbook. The presence turns out to be a Ghoul named Little Ghoul, who wants to live in the house. Meanwhile, the Crustaceans set a trap for the Beetleborgs using amphibious Aqualung monster.
58	5	"Totally Slammin' Sector Cycles"	John Putch	Bob Allen	September 12, 1997
The Crustaceans summon the Hagfish of Gar, a monster who can put children under its control with its song as well as spew slime, and Nukus attempts to use it to brainwash all the children of Charterville (including Drew, Jo, Heather, and Roland) by sending them through an "Evil Archway". With the Battle Station left inoperable by Hagfish's song, Flabber provides the children with three new motorcycles, called Sector Cycles.
59	6	"Headless Over Heels"	John Putch	Joel M. Barkow, Louis J. Zivot	September 15, 1997
An old acquaintance of Wolfgang's, who had lost his head after sneezing at the werewolf's fleas, visits Hillhurst to get his head back. Nukus believes that the headless ghost is an ally of the Beetleborgs and attacks before they do.
60	7	"Monster Imposter"	Gabe Torres	Jonathan Cuba	September 16, 1997
In order to get to Flabber and prevent him from assisting the Beetleborgs with magical help, the Crustaceans use the serpentine Changeling, that can turn into any monster of the Hillhurst and therefore can sneak into the house without being recognized.
61	8	"Horror Hotel"	Gabe Torres	Taylor Grant	September 17, 1997
The monsters have to raise money for Hillhurst and they turn the house into a hotel for monsters. Nukus takes advantage of the situation and sends a plant-like creature called Furnzilla to destroy the Beetleborgs by pretending to be a hag.
62	9	"Les is More"	Gabe Torres	Peter Lebrow, J-P Chanda	September 18, 1997
Les draws a monster named Roo-thless, whom he thinks will defeat the Beetleborgs, much to Nukus' displeasure. Vilor uses Nukus' sword to bring Roo-thless to life anyway, unaware that since Nukus was not the one to bring him out, a portal will open in 24 hours that will send all 2D creations back to their world. With no other choice, the Crustaceans have to team up with the Beetleborgs or be sent back to the pages.
63	10	"Sunset Boo-levard"	Brian Thomas Jones	Joel M. Barkow, Louis J. Zivot	September 19, 1997
An aging starlet from Hollywood's silent era (and now ghost) shows up at Hillhurst, to see her fan Fangs wanting to make a comeback. At the same time, Nukus calls in the Ultimate Conqueror monster, which the Beetleborgs may not be able to beat.
64	11	"Extra...Beetleborgs Revealed"	Brian Thomas Jones	Kojo Katoaka, Oak O'Connor	September 22, 1997
An anxious journalist seeks out the Beetleborgs' secret identities and finds them. With the help of the monsters, the kids have to keep her quiet about this, even if it means going through the newly created Torch Mouth monster to do it.
65	12	"Who's That Ghoul?"	Brian Thomas Jones	M.A. Evans	September 23, 1997
Deadly Nightshade, a Transylvanian bounty hunter, comes to Hillhurst. He wants to capture Little Ghoul for stealing a magic wand from a witch who mistreated her. Flabber calls in the Beetleborgs to force him out, but Nightshade then teams up with the Crustaceans and Les' latest monster, Ultra Vulture, to get the wand for themselves.
66	13	"Attack of the Brain Suckers"	Worth Keeter	Margo McCahon	September 24, 1997
Les' latest creation, the Brain Sucker, becomes the star of a new comic book series, which ends up outselling that of the Beetleborgs'. This newfound popularity leads to the Brain Sucker monster going on a brain-sucking rampage, all the way to Hillhurst.
67	14	"Don't Fear the Reaper"	Joel M. Barkow, Louis J. Zivot	Worth Keeter	September 29, 1997
Little Ghoul's uncle, the Grim Reaper, comes to Hillhurst, but he does not want to kill anyone, but rather choose a replacement. The House Monsters compete for his favor, but Nukus wants to gain the position himself by wiping them out with Les' Monster Smasher.
68	15	"The Old Gray Flabber"	Clifford Herbert	Worth Keeter	October 3, 1997
Horribelle leaves a portrait of Flabber on the front porch. When Flabber retrieves it, he constantly glances at it to see his beautiful self. One thing he does not know is that the painting is sucking the life out of him, making him older and weaker. He refuses to destroy it because he was so handsome in the portrait, but the Beetleborgs have to do something before it is too late. To keep the kids away, Nukus releases the Triplesaurus Rex on Charterville to speed up the process.
69	16	"Son of Frankenbeans"	Gabe Torres	David Fletcher	October 10, 1997
Dr. Baron Von Frankenbeans sends his latest creation, a younger version of Frankenbeans known as "Little Frankie" (voiced by Robert Axelrod) to live with his "big brother" at Hillhurst doing his trip. Meanwhile, the kids are constantly trying to prove to one another about who is the best Beetleborg, putting them at risk of being Piranha Khan's next meal.
70	17	"How Does Your Garden Grow?"	Gabe Torres	Elizabeth Ann Cooper	October 20, 1997
Little Ghoul takes up some abnormal gardening after Horribelle leaves the Seed of Evil at Hillhurst. The seed grows into a cactus (which Little Ghoul names it Emily), and then into a full female cactus monster capable of aging anyone, including the other monsters. Whether Little Ghoul likes it or not, the Beetleborgs have to destroy Emily, or everyone will age out.
71	18	"The Curse of the Mummy's Mommy"	Gabe Torres	Karyn Naumo, Tom Milo	October 30, 1997
Mums' mommy, who is also a mummy, comes to town, with a cursed ring that turns Fang into a monstrous bat, one recruited by the Crustaceans.
72	19	"Halloween Haunted House of Horrors"	Worth Keeter	Jonathan Cuba	October 31, 1997
Mums lures local kids to the manor on Halloween, prompting the Beetleborgs to prevent them from being the Hillhurst monsters next meal. Seeing the opportunity, Nukus releases El Scorpio to crash the party.
73	20	"Booger Man"	Worth Keeter	Taylor Grant	November 3, 1997
The Booger Man, a nightmare inducing monster, appears at Hillhurst to give the house monsters nightmares, but Nukus captures him so he will give Les a nightmare, one to inspire the creation of Shellator.
74	21	"The Poe and the Pendulum"	Worth Keeter	Joel M. Barkow, Louis J. Zivot	November 6, 1997
After a huge lunch the monsters at Hillhurst fall asleep, but are rudely awakened by a raven, which announces the arrival of the famous writer Edgar Allan Poe, whose presence at Hillhurst is followed by a series of weird events, in which nothing is as it seems to be. Meanwhile, Nukus has Les draw up the Mole Monster to steal Edgar's latest book.
75	22	"The Lost Comic (Part 1)"	Gabe Torres	Margo McCahon	November 7, 1997
Tired of creating, Les tries to quit the Crustaceans, only to come up with a plan: when Art and Les Fortunes were children, they produced a homemade comic book together. As their only collaboration, this led to the creation of the powerful Astral Sword which summons the all-powerful RoboBorg. Les leads the Crustaceans in a quest to find where he buried it years ago. Art and the Beetleborgs are also in pursuit for it. Within its pages are the predecessors to the Beetleborgs, the Astralborgs and Mantrons.
76	23	"Enter the Dragon Borg (Part 2)"	Gabe Torres	Steve W. Sessions	November 10, 1997
The Monsters have stolen the four Astral Coins in the Beetleborgs position. While trying to get them back, the Mantrons poison Flabber, preventing the kids powers from working. Fortunately, one of the Astral Coins summons the heroic Dragonborg to help.
77	24	"To Foretell the Truth (Part 3)"	Gabe Torres	M.A. Evans	November 14, 1997
Flabber calls in a psychic to figure out where the Astral Coins are. Also, the Beetleborgs gain a new Astral Borg ally, in Fireborg.
78	25	"Wolfie's Wild Ride (Part 4)"	Nils Molitor	Peter Lebow, J-P Chanda	November 17, 1997
Wolfgang wants to come along with the Beetleborgs and the Astral Borgs to see what it is like to be in the middle of a battle against other comic monsters.
79	26	"Lady and the Champs (Part 5)"	Nils Molitor	Joel M. Barkow, Louis J. Zivot	November 21, 1997
Count Fangula is feeling ill and seems that he swallowed one of the Astral Coins. Horribelle, disguised as a nurse, attempts to retrieve it. Should Fangs manage to cough it up, the Beetleborgs will gain a new Astralborg ally, the Ladyborg.
80	27	"Astral Ransom (Part 6)"	Nils Molitorr	M.A. Evans	November 24, 1997
Flabber is kidnapped and the enemies want in return the Astral Sword and all 8 Astral Coins.
81	28	"Astral Ambush (Part 7)"	Tom Shelly	M.A. Evans	November 25, 1997
An ambush is done by the Crustaceans, now helped by the stronger Super Vilor, to eliminate the Astralborgs so they can get at the three puny Beetleborgs.
82	29	"Roboborg (Part 8)"	Tom Shelly	Heather McCahon	November 26, 1997
The 8 Astral Coins are reunited with the Astral Sword, leading to the summoning of the giant robot beetle fighting creature Roboborg.
83	30	"Mega Spectra Beetleborgs"	Tom Shelly	Joel M. Barkow, Louis J. Zivot	February 9, 1998
Nukus and Vilor get an upgrade, going Mega powered. To even things up, the Beetleborgs are given a power-boost by Roboborg, fusing their old powers with their Metallix ones, creating the Mega Spectra Beetleborgs and Mega-Spectra Sector Cycles.
84	31	"Battle of the Giants"	James Mathers	M.A. Evans	February 10, 1998
Les creates the Astral Ax, and with it, Roboborg's evil counterpart, known as Boron. Mega-Nukus pits Boron and Roboborg against one another.
85	32	"Robo Rumble"	James Mathers	Heather McCahon	February 16, 1998
Roboborg battles Boron on the moon.
86	33	"Super Fang"	James Mathers	Steven W. Sessions	February 17, 1998
Count Fangula becomes a super hero by helping out the Beetleborgs defeat their rivals/enemies.
87	34	"Experiment in Evil"	Tom Shelly	M.A. Evans	February 23, 1998
Dr. Baron Von Frankenbeans' latest creation, a mutant plant named Monster Mother, is sought by Mega-Nukus' forces, but the Crustaceans cannot control it.
88	35	"Mega Borg Power"	Tom Shelly	Heather McCahon	March 2, 1998
Nukus combines his magic and Les' drawings to create Repgillian, an incredibly powerful monster, one that can only be defeated by the combine efforts of RoboBorg and Boron. The only catch is the Crustaceans still have the Astral Axe, and they won't give it unless the kids give up their Bonders.
