= Richard Smallwood =

Richard Smallwood may refer to:

- Richard Smallwood (doctor) (1937–2024), Chief Medical Officer of Australia
- Richard Smallwood (footballer) (born 1990), English footballer
- Richard Smallwood (musician) (1948–2025), American gospel musician
