= Thomas Smallwood (basketball) =

American basketball player

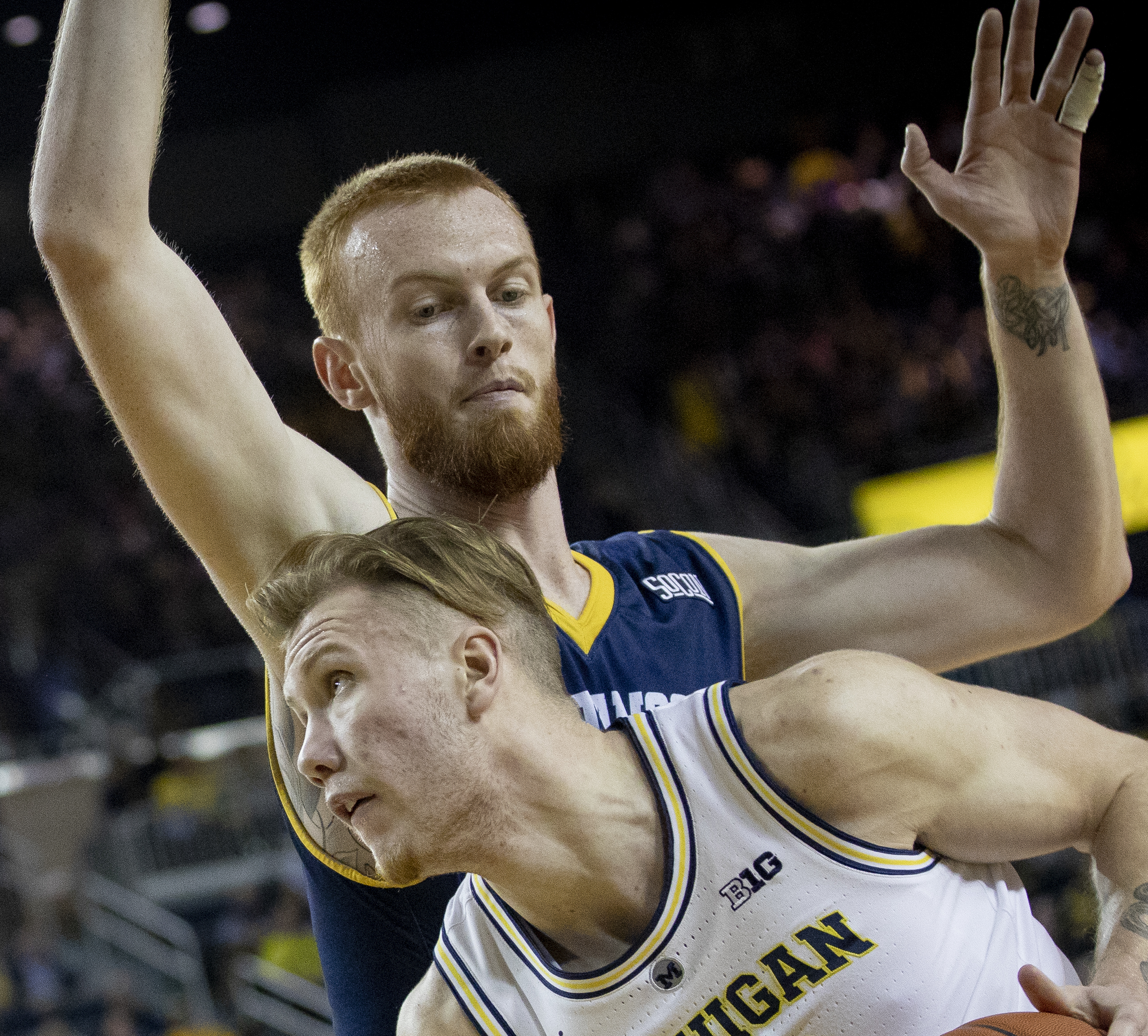
- Smallwood (top) in November 2018

CB Menorca
- Position: Center
- League: LEB Plata

Personal information
- Born: 30 March 1995 (age 31) Roanne, France
- Listed height: 213 cm (7 ft 0 in)
- Listed weight: 109 kg (240 lb)

Career information
- College: UAB (2015–2018); Chattanooga (2018–2019)
- NBA draft: 2019: undrafted
- Playing career: 2019–present

Career history
- 2019–2020: ESSM Le Portel
- 2020: Aris Leeuwarden
- 2020–2021: Tours
- 2021–2022: CB Menorca
- 2022–2023: CB Prat
- 2023–present: Laguna Sharks Bucuresti

Thomas Max Smallwood (born 30 March 1995) is a French professional basketball player for CB Menorca of the LEB Plata. Standing at 213 cm (7 ft 0 in), he plays as center.

== College career ==
As a freshman, Smallwood averaged 3.9 points and 1.9 rebounds per game. Following his junior season, he transferred to Chattanooga, becoming the program's first graduate transfer. Smallwood averaged six points per game.

== Professional career ==
Smallwood started his professional career with ESSM Le Portel in his native France.

In August 2020, Smallwood signed a one-year contract with Aris Leeuwarden of the Dutch Basketball League (DBL). He played one game with Aris before the season was suspended due to the COVID-19 pandemic. He left Aris to sign with Union Tours Basket Metropole in France. Smallwood averaged 6.3 points and 3.0 rebounds per game. On August 27, 2021, he signed with CB Menorca of the LEB Plata.
