= Rappin' Granny =

American hip-hop musician (1933–2017)

- Born: Vivian Lee Smallwood; June 18, 1933; Los Angeles, California, U.S.
- Origin: Castaic, California, U.S.
- Died: July 22, 2017 (aged 84) Castaic, California, U.S.
- Genres: Hip hop
- Occupations: Musician; Actress
- Instrument: Guitar
- Years active: 1989–2017

Vivian Smallwood (June 18, 1933 – July 22, 2017), known by her stage name Rappin' Granny, was an American grandmother who performed hip-hop music. She lived in Castaic, California, near Los Angeles.

Outside of being known for portraying "Nano" Williams in Big Bad Beetleborgs, Smallwood was a contestant on the NBC television series America's Got Talent during the 2006 season.

== Career ==
=== Rapping ===
Smallwood was employed as a postal worker and began rapping in the mid-1980s. She took first place in a rap contest at a South-Central Los Angeles roller rink with an anti-drug themed rap. By 1988 she had formed a group with her son called Rappin' Granny and DJ Len. She won a Granny of the Year contest in Pasadena in 1988, performing a rap version of the song "The Little Old Lady from Pasadena". In 1989, she released a little-known, self-titled music video called "Rock-n-Soul". Smallwood was signed to Tandem Records in 1992. She released the single "You Didn't Use Your Blinker Fool" as a response to the DJ Jazzy Jeff & The Fresh Prince song "You Saw My Blinker". A brand of soda, Rappin Granny's Slammin Strawberry Hip Hop Pop, was named for her in 1995.

=== Acting ===
Smallwood had been a working Hollywood actress since the mid-1990s. She has appeared in numerous television shows with small parts and a few feature films. Some of her credits are, Everybody Hates Chris, Malcolm in the Middle, The Shield, and The Ladykillers. In Don't Be a Menace to South Central While Drinking Your Juice in the Hood (1996) she is credited as Vivian 'Rappin Granny' Smallwood. She also played Roland Williams' grandmother "Nano" in Big Bad Beetleborgs, a show on the former Fox Kids network.

In 2012, she appeared on the How I Met Your Mother episode "The Magician's Code: Part 1".

Smallwood was featured in the Apollo Theater's Apollo Circus of Soul in 2007.

==== America's Got Talent ====
Smallwood was a contestant on the NBC television series America's Got Talent and qualified on the August 16, 2006 season finale for the one-million-dollar grand prize. In her audition, Rappin' Granny gave a performance that was very popular among the crowd and the judges, all of whom (Brandy, David Hasselhoff, and Piers Morgan) advanced her to the next round by way of a unanimous vote. Smallwood then returned for the semifinal episode that aired July 26, 2006. After another crowd-pleasing song, the judges again put her through to the next round, by another unanimous vote. For the final round, Smallwood rode in on a motorcycle, but finished in the bottom half of the public vote.

== Personal life ==
Smallwood had 15 grandchildren and 9 great-grandchildren.

== Death ==
Vivian Smallwood died from natural causes at the age of 84 on July 22, 2017.

== Filmography ==
Year	Title	Role	Notes
1996	Don't Be a Menace to South Central While Drinking Your Juice in the Hood	Sister Williams	
1996-1998	Big Bad Beetleborgs	"Nano" Williams	46 episodes
2004	The Ladykillers	Tea Lady	
2004	Gas	Beatrice	
2005	Halfway Decent	Tom's Mom	
2005-2008	Everybody Hates Chris	Old Black Lady	9 episodes
2009	A Day in the Life	Granny	
2010	Dirty Girl	Shellie the Neighbor	
2012	Seeking a Friend for the End of the World	Speck's Mother	Uncredited, (final film role)
