= Charmaine Marchand-Stiaes =

American politician

Charmaine Marchand-Stiaes is an American politician. She served as a Democratic member of the Louisiana House of Representatives from 2004 to 2012. During her tenure, she highlighted the havoc wreaked by Hurricane Katrina on her constituents.
