= Barclay Littlewood =

British entrepreneur (born 1978)

- Born: 11 May 1978 (age 47); Huddersfield, England
- Occupations: Founder of Ukessays.com, Ukessay.com
- Years active: 1994–present

Barclay James Littlewood (born 1978 in Huddersfield) is a British barrister and entrepreneur who founded Ukessays.com, a commercial writing service which sells essays and other academic work. The work is sold over the Internet to students in the UK, the US and Western Europe. Despite criticism about the fact that students represent the work as their own, the company maintains copyright in all their work and they claim that the essays they sell are to be used as a study guide.

== Career ==
After training as a barrister at Gray's Inn, Littlewood set up his company in 2003, based in Arnold, Nottinghamshire.

The sale of academic work by Littlewood's and other companies has proved controversial and there have been frequent accusations in the media, especially from universities, that Littlewood's businesses encourage plagiarism. Littlewood claims that the essays are sold to aid students with their research.

== See also ==
- Essay mill
