= Lynsey Dyer =

American freestyle skier and big mountain skier

Personal information
- Nationality: American
- Born: March 13, 1983 (age 43)

Sport
- Sport: Skiing

Lynsey Dyer (born March 13, 1983) is an American freestyle skier and big mountain skier. She co-founded the non-profit SheJumps.org and founded the movie production and apparel company Unicorn Picnic, encouraging girls and women to participate in the outdoors through mentorship.

== Early life ==
Dyer grew up and learned to ski in Sun Valley, Idaho.

== Skiing ==
Dyer was the first woman to be on the cover of Freeskier Magazine. She has won several freesking competitions and awards including the 2004 International Free Skiers Association North American tour champion. In 2010, Powder Magazine awarded her Best Female Performance for her role in Magic Moments.

== Photography ==
Dyer took an iconic photo of four base jumpers leaping from Half Done in Yosemite National Park, including the late Dean Potter. The image was published as a double page spread in National Geographic Magazine and beyond.

== Film and television ==
Dyer has been in 18 ski films produced by film companies such as Warren Miller, (TGR), Sherpas Cinema, Rage, Generation Flinga, and Storm Shadow. Her most recent films include, "Under the Influence, "Tangerine Dream" "Catch Me If You Can", Rage Film's "Down Days", Warren Miller's "Children of Winter", and Teton Gravity Research's "Lost and Found".

Dyer produced, directed and starred in the first all female ski film "Pretty Faces" with the film production and apparel brand she founded, Unicorn Picnic. The film was released in 2014 to much acclaim after fundraising $113K on Kickstarter, the most ever raised for an action sports film which transformed the male dominated outdoor industry to be more inclusive of its 40% female market.

Dyer has hosted television shows such as Freestyle files for NBC, the Ski Tour for ESPN and Mountainfilm for Outside Television. She has been seen in television commercials ranging from Jeep to Nissan to Coors. She has been featured on the Weather Channel, Good Morning America and regional shows. Dyer starred in two shows on The Ski Channel for the 2009/2010 ski season. One was a talk show entitled Moguls and the other a journey show where she travels to Japan. In the Japan show, Lynsey was injured and had eye surgery in a Japanese hospital.

Lynsey starred on the Bravo show Après Ski.
