= Dexter in the Newsagent =

English singer-songwriter

- Born: Charmaine Ayoku; South London, England
- Genres: Alternative pop; alternative R&B; bedroom pop
- Years active: 2020–present
- Labels: AWAL; Common Knowledge
- Website: www.dexterinthenewsagent.com

Charmaine Ayoku, also known as Dexter in the Newsagent (stylized in all lowercase), is an English singer-songwriter. She became known through the EPs I Do Love a Good Sandwich (2021) and Fortune Cookie (2022) and released the mixtape Time Flies in 2025.

== Early life ==
Charmaine Ayoku was born in South West London, England, and is of Nigerian descent. Her parents met in Nigeria, and her mother moved to London, but her father was unable to accompany her due to visa issues. Thus, the family frequently flew out of the country to visit her father on his farm in Lagos. Ayoku attended a majority-white private school on a bursary.

== Career ==
After being inspired by a Rex Orange County concert at the Koko, Ayoku began taking making music seriously during the COVID-19 pandemic and began uploading covers to SoundCloud of musicians such as Beabadobee and Joji. The music she put out then was entirely self-created on her phone. The name "Dexter", a name she found funny, came from a desire to hide the project from her family—they only found out after her song "Blue Sky" aired on BBC Radio 1. "In the Newsagent" was added later to distinguish her from the TV series Dexter. Ayoku released her debut project, the EP I Do Love A Good Sandwich, on 4 August 2021, and followed it up with Fortune Cookie the following year, which leaned more into dance-pop. She was initially meant to pursue a degree in art history at the University of Manchester, but, as her popularity grew, she pulled out three days before classes started.

In July 2025, Ayoku collaborated with Jim Legxacy on "Dexters Phone Call", a song from the latter's mixtape Black British Music (2025). She opened for him and also Blood Orange later that year. On 7 November, she released the mixtape Time Flies. It was written in the period after her father's death and contained themes of introspection and hope for the future.

== Influences and artistry ==
Ayoku is influenced by Rex Orange County, Solange Knowles, Clairo, early PinkPantheress, Imogen Heap, SZA, Frank Ocean and Tyler, the Creator. Ayoku had initially wanted to make UK garage music, but her bedroom pop sound developed after collaboration with her producer.

== Discography ==
=== Mixtapes ===
Title	Details
Time Flies	Released: 7 November 2025; Label: Self-released; Formats: Digital download

=== Extended plays ===
Title	Details
I Do Love a Good Sandwich	Released: 4 August 2021; Label: Common Knowledge; Formats: Digital download
Fortune Cookie	Released: 30 September 2022; Label: AWAL, Rules the World Records; Formats: Digital download

=== Singles ===
Title	Year	Album
"Good Time"	2020	Non-album singles
"In the Dark"	2020	Non-album singles
"Same Way"	2020	Non-album singles
"For U"	2020	Non-album singles
"Maybe the Problem Is Me"	2021	Non-album singles
"Blue Skies"	2021	I Do Love a Good Sandwich
"Paper Cup/Different"	2022	Non-album singles
"Pressure"	2022	Fortune Cookie
"Closing the Door on Us"	2023	Non-album singles
"The Way/A While Now"	2023	Non-album singles
"More to me"	2023	Non-album singles
"Someone to you"	2024	Non-album singles
"With u"	2025	Time Flies
"Special"	2025	Time Flies
"Eighteen"	2025	Time Flies
"I told ya"	2025	Time Flies
"Fantasy"	2026	Non-album singles
"Edge of the World"	2026	Non-album singles

=== Guest appearances ===
List of guest appearances, with other performing artists, showing year released and album name
Title	Year	Other performer(s)	Album
"trespass coat"	2024	Niko B	Dog Eat Dog Food World
"dexter's phone call"	2025	Jim Legxacy	Black British Music (2025)
