= George Littlewood (cricketer, born 1857) =

English cricketer

George William Littlewood (10 May 1857 – 5 March 1928) was an English cricketer active in 1885 who played for Lancashire. He was born in Holmfirth and died in Oldham. He appeared in three first-class matches as a righthanded batsman and wicketkeeper. He scored 28 runs with a highest score of 8* and held four catches with three stumpings. He was the father of George H. Littlewood.
