= George Littlewood (cricketer, born 1882) =

English cricketer

George Hubert Littlewood (12 May 1882 – 20 December 1917) was an English cricketer active from 1902 to 1904 who played for Lancashire. He was born in Friarmere, Yorkshire and died in Oldham. He appeared in 14 first-class matches and bowled slow left arm orthodox. He scored 129 runs with a highest score of 42 and held twelve catches. He took 58 wickets with a best analysis of seven for 49. He was the son of George W. Littlewood.
