= George Smallwood =

American musician (1945–2016)

George Franklin Smallwood
- Born: 1945; Washington D.C.
- Died: 2 May 2016 (aged 70–71); Hyattsville, Maryland
- Occupation: Musician

George Franklin Smallwood (1945 – 2 May 2016), was an American singer, drummer and keyboard player whose musical output was a mix of country, soul, and funk. He self-released several singles, and one album, starting in the late 1970s. In the 2000s his work was rediscovered by record collectors, which led to reissues and new compilations being released.

== History ==
Smallwood was born in Washington D.C. at the end of 1945. He grew up in a musical family, his grandfather played fiddle and his father played guitar in a band that worked honky-tonks in rural Maryland. He attended St. Gabriel’s in Petworth and played baseball on the school team, of which he was the only black member.

He was a professional truck driver until 1968, when he was shot in the face and lost his sight.

Once Smallwood went blind, he devoted much of his time to music. He taught himself to sing and play keyboard. He recruited people he knew to join his band, including members of his family and his mailman, who turned out to be a pretty good bass player. During the 1970s and 1980s Smallwood and his group, Marshmellow Band, released six singles and an LP, Just 4 You. While not initially popular in the US, British Northern soul DJs discovered and began to play his songs.

By the late 2000s record collectors in the US had rediscovered his music, with Washington City Paper reporting in 2009 that copies of his album had recently been sold for as much as $1000. Labels such as Peoples Potential Unlimited and Jazzman began to reissue singles and put out compilation albums.

He died on 2 May 2016 of a heart attack. He had continued to perform locally until shortly before his death.

== Discography ==
=== Singles ===
- Touching Is My Thing / Overheard (1974)
- Mr. Sunshine
- Lady Disco (1978)
- Hey Jude / Roller Coaster (1984)

=== Albums ===
- Just 4 You (1981)
