= EsDeeKid discography =

- Studio albums: 1
- Singles: 17

The discography of British rapper EsDeeKid consists of one studio album and 17 singles. EsDeeKid's first known song was a feature on "Altered" by DualSpines, released in 2023. He began releasing standalone music in May 2024, releasing a remix of "Black Beatles" by Rae Sremmurd on SoundCloud. Other non-album singles he released include "Apathy", "Slurricane" (with Fakemink), "Number (N)ine Freestyle", "Gracias", "Palaces" (with Rico Ace), "Tapped In" (with SINN6R), "Ferragamo", "Bally" (with Rico Ace), "Little Kidda" and "Warmin' Up".

His 2024 single "Bally" featuring Rico Ace was highlighted in Pitchfork's "The Ones" column, where Alphonse Pierre described it as one of the year's standout tracks and named EsDeeKid one of the year's breakout stars. The song received international success and established his partnership with Rico Ace, who would later appear on some of his best-known tracks.

His debut album, Rebel, was released on 20 June 2025 through Lizzy Records. The project included the singles "LV Sandals", "5am", and "Phantom" alongside 8 other original tracks. Rebel charted in the United Kingdom, Ireland and several other European countries, reaching number 16 on the UK Albums Chart and appearing on national album charts in Austria, Belgium, Finland, Lithuania, the Netherlands, Norway, Sweden and Switzerland. His monthly listeners on streaming platforms such as Spotify and YouTube, also increased significantly.

As of March 2026, EsDeekid's most listened-to track on Spotify is "Phantom" (featuring Rico Ace). Since its release in March 2025, it has amassed over 250 million streams.

== Discography ==
=== Mixtapes ===
List of albums, with selected details and peak chart positions
| Title | Details | Peak chart positions | | | | | | | | | | Certifications |
| Title | Details | UK | BEL (FL) | FIN | IRE | LTU | NLD | NOR | SWE | SWI | US | Certifications |
|---|---|---|---|---|---|---|---|---|---|---|---|---|
| Rebel | Released: 20 June 2025; Label: XV, Lizzy; Format: Digital download, streaming | 8 | 22 | 10 | 11 | 1 | 18 | 11 | 12 | 6 | 23 | BPI: Gold |

=== Singles ===
List of singles, with selected peak chart positions
| Title | Year | Peak chart positions | | | | | | | | | | Certifications | Album |
| Title | Year | UK | UK Ind. | AUS | CAN | IRE | LTU | NZ | US | US R&B/HH | WW | Certifications | Album |
|---|---|---|---|---|---|---|---|---|---|---|---|---|---|
| "Apathy" | 2024 | — | — | — | — | — | — | — | — | — | — | | Non-album singles |
| "Slurricane" (with Fakemink) | 2024 | — | — | — | — | — | — | — | — | — | — | | Non-album singles |
| "Number (N)ine Freestyle" | 2024 | — | — | — | — | — | — | — | — | — | — | | Non-album singles |
| "Gracias" | 2024 | — | — | — | — | — | — | — | — | — | — | | Non-album singles |
| "Palaces" (with Rico Ace) | 2024 | — | — | — | — | — | — | — | — | — | — | | Non-album singles |
| "Tapped In" (featuring SINN6R) | 2024 | — | — | — | — | — | — | — | — | — | — | | Non-album singles |
| "Ferragamo" | 2024 | — | — | — | — | — | — | — | — | — | — | | Non-album singles |
| "Bally" (with Rico Ace) | 2024 | — | — | — | — | — | — | — | — | — | — | | Non-album singles |
| "Little Kidda" | 2024 | — | — | — | — | — | — | — | — | — | — | | Non-album singles |
| "Warmin' Up" | 2024 | — | — | — | — | — | — | — | — | — | — | | Non-album singles |
| "LV Sandals" (with Fakemink and Rico Ace) | 2025 | 99 | 12 | 90 | 83 | 80 | 10 | — | — (Note: "LV Sandals" did not enter the Billboard Hot 100, but peaked at number 9 on the Bubbling Under Hot 100 chart.) | 23 | — | BPI: Silver; RMNZ: Gold | Rebel |
| "Phantom" (with Rico Ace) | 2025 | 12 | 2 | 21 | 35 | 15 | 1 | 30 | 67 | 14 | 85 | BPI: Gold; ARIA: Gold; RMNZ: Gold | Rebel |
| "4 Raws" | 2025 | 20 | 4 | 21 | 26 | 26 | 5 | 28 | 28 | 8 | 38 | BPI: Silver; ARIA: Gold; RMNZ: Gold | Rebel |
| "Cali Man" (with Rico Ace) | 2025 | — | 17 | — | — | — | 35 | — | — | 48 | — | BPI: Silver | Rebel |
| "Century" | 2025 | 10 | 2 | 45 | 72 | 11 | 12 | — (Note: "Century" did not chart on the NZ Top 40 Singles Chart, but peaked at number 6 on the NZ Hot Singles Chart.) | — (Note: "Century" did not enter the Billboard Hot 100, but peaked at number 6 on the Bubbling Under Hot 100 chart.) | 20 | — | BPI: Silver; ARIA: Gold | TBA |
| "Omens" | 2026 | 75 | 27 | — | — | — | — | — (Note: "Omens" did not chart on the NZ Top 40 Singles Chart, but peaked at number 14 on the NZ Hot Singles Chart.) | — | — | — | | TBA |
| "Made It on Our Own" (with Yeat) | 2026 | — | — | — | 92 | — | — | — (Note: "Made It on Our Own" did not chart on the NZ Top 40 Singles Chart, but peaked at number 10 on the NZ Hot Singles Chart.) | — (Note: "Made It on Our Own" did not enter the Billboard Hot 100, but peaked at number 14 on the Bubbling Under Hot 100 chart.) | 39 | — | | Non-album single |
| "RockWave" | 2026 | — | — | — | — | — | — | — (Note: "RockWave" did not enter the NZ Top 40 Singles Chart, but it peaked at number 23 on the NZ Hot Singles Chart.) | — | — | — | | TBA |
"—" denotes a recording that did not chart in that territory.

=== Other charted songs ===
List of other charted songs, with selected peak chart positions
| Title | Year | Peak chart positions | | | | Album |
| Title | Year | UK Ind. | AUS | LTU | US R&B/HH | Album |
|---|---|---|---|---|---|---|
| "Mist" (with Rico Ace) | 2025 | 34 | — | 95 | 49 | Rebel |
| "Rottweiler" | 2025 | 15 | 82 | 45 | 42 | Rebel |
"—" denotes a recording that did not chart in that territory.

== Awards and nominations ==
| Organization | Year | Category | Nominated work | Result | Ref. |
|---|---|---|---|---|---|
| Berlin Music Video Awards | 2026 | Best Low Budget | "Century" | Pending | |
| BRIT Awards | 2026 | British Breakthrough Artist | Himself | Nominated | |
