= The Boy Who Cried Terrified =

EP by Fakemink
- Released: 29 January 2026
- Genres: Jerk; cloud rap; UK rap
- Length: 14:40
- Label: EtnaVeraVela
- Producers: Burial; Cranes; Fakemink; Flawed Mangoes; Liv; Moustafax2; Wraith9

Fakemink chronology
London's Saviour (2023)	The Boy Who Cried Terrified (2026)	Terrified (2026)

The Boy Who Cried Terrified (stylised as The Boy who cried Terrified .) is an extended play (EP) by the English rapper, Fakemink, released under EtnaVeraVela. It was released on his birthday, 29 January 2026, as a bridge between his 2026 album, titled Terrified. It is a seven-track EP that features production from Burial, Cranes, Liv, Moustafax2, Wraith9, and Fakemink himself.

== Background and release ==
Fakemink first rose to fame with the release of his 2023 album London's Saviour, and following his rise to stardom, he continued to maintain his fame with single releases such as "Easter Pink", "Makka", and "Givenchy".

In an interview with Zane Lowe on Apple Music, Fakemink reflected on his production style and whether he suffers from impostor syndrome. He shared that he wants to prove he can craft an "amazing self-produced album from scratch," citing Kanye West's performance of "They Say" as a major inspiration. Fakemink noted that seeing the performance "changed" him and pushed him to create his own beats.

== Critical reception ==
Professional ratings
Review scores
Source	Rating
The Needle Drop	6/10
Pitchfork	6.9/10

The Boy Who Cried Terrified received generally positive reviews from music critics.

== Track listing ==
The Boy Who Cried Terrified track listing
No.	Title	Writer(s)	Producer(s)	Length
1.	"Blow the Speaker"	Tina Temps; Harley Riecansky	Wraith9	2:25
2.	"Young Millionaire"	Temps; Evan Lo	Fakemink; Flawed Mangoes	1:51
3.	"Dumb"	Temps; Moustafa Moustafa	Fakemink; Moustafax2	1:37
4.	"Mr. Chow"	Temps; Moustafa	Fakemink; Moustafax2	2:26
5.	"The Mercer"	Temps; Moustafa	Fakemink; Moustafax2	1:35
6.	"Milk & Honey"	Temps; Harley Riecansky	Wraith9	2:05
7.	"FML"	Temps; Owen Jablonski; Gavin DeGraw; Will Bevan	Burial; Cranes	2:41
Total length:				14:40

Notes

- "FML" is stylised in lowercase.
- All tracks are stylised with a space followed by a full stop. For example, "Blow the Speaker" is stylised as "Blow the Speaker ."
