= Century (EsDeeKid song) =

2025 single by EsDeeKid

Single by EsDeeKid
- Released: 31 October 2025
- Genre: UK rap
- Length: 1:49
- Label: XV; Lizzy
- Songwriters: EsDeeKid; Cppo; Panafriqana
- Producers: Cppo; Panafriqana

EsDeeKid singles chronology
"Cali Man" (2025)	"Century" (2025)	"Omens" (2026)

Music video
- "Century" on YouTube

"Century" is a song by British rapper EsDeeKid, released on 31 October 2025. It was produced by Cppo and Panafriqana.

== Background ==
The song was produced by Cppo and Panafriqana, and is the first single released by EsDeeKid following his debut album, Rebel.

== Commercial performance ==
According to Luminate, the song earned 1.68 million official on-demand U.S. streams in the week of November 14–20, marking a two-week gain of 156%.

== Charts ==
Chart performance
Chart (2025–2026)	Peak position
Australia (ARIA)	45
Australia Hip Hop/R&B (ARIA)	7
Canada (Canadian Hot 100)	72
Czech Republic Singles Digital (ČNS IFPI)	55
Greece International (IFPI)	41
Ireland (IRMA)	11
Latvia Streaming (LaIPA)	9
Lithuania (AGATA)	12
Netherlands (Single Tip)	11
New Zealand Hot Singles (RMNZ)	6
Slovakia Singles Digital (ČNS IFPI)	37
UK Singles (Official Charts)	10
UK Indie (Official Charts)	2
UK Hip Hop/R&B (Official Charts)	2
US Bubbling Under Hot 100 (Billboard)	6
US Hot R&B/Hip-Hop Songs (Billboard)	20

== Certifications ==
Certifications for "Century"
Region	Certification	Certified units/sales
Australia (ARIA)	Gold	35,000^{‡}
^{‡} Sales+streaming figures based on certification alone.
