= Thaiboy Digital =

Thai rapper, singer, and producer

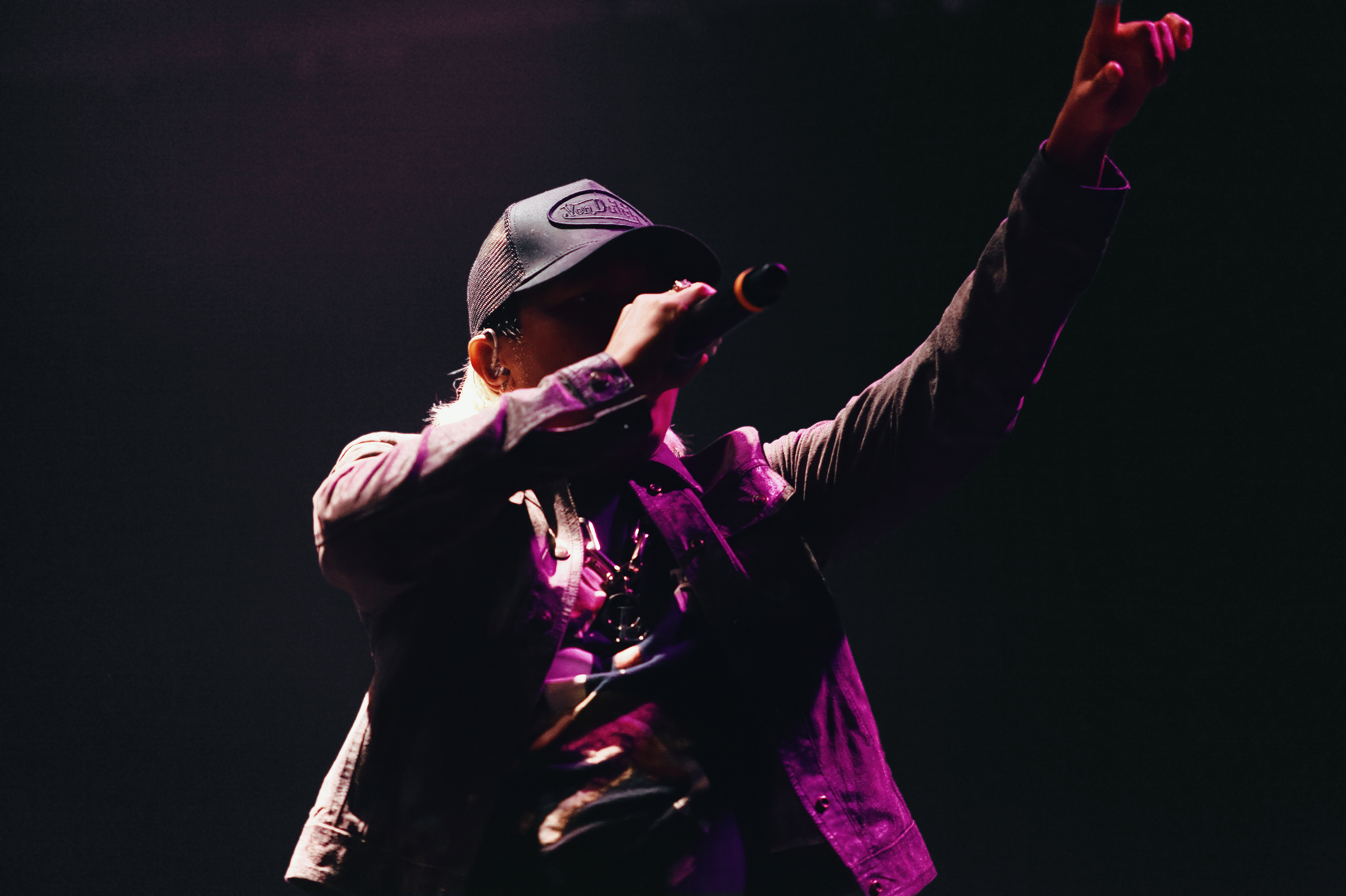
- Thaiboy Digital in June 2026

Background information
- Also known as: Thanapat Thaothawong; Thaiboy Goon; DJ Billybool; Nino
- Born: 1994 or 1995 (age 30–31); Khon Kaen, Thailand
- Origin: Stockholm, Sweden
- Genres: Cloud rap; trap; art pop; eurotrance
- Occupations: Rapper; singer; songwriter; record producer; fashion designer
- Instrument: Vocals
- Years active: 2010–present
- Labels: Year0001 (former); Bank of Star Sound System
- Member of: Drain Gang

Thanapat "Nino" Bunleang (born Khazitin G. Bonleunge), better known by his stage name Thaiboy Digital, is a Thai rapper, singer, songwriter, record producer, and fashion designer. Born in Khon Kaen, Thailand, Bunleang moved to Stockholm, Sweden at the age of eight and is now based in Bangkok. Bunleang, together with childhood friends Bladee, Ecco2k and Whitearmor is a founding member of the Swedish hip-hop collective Drain Gang. After working on multiple mixtapes, some of them collaborative efforts with other Drain Gang members, Bunleang released his debut studio album Legendary Member in 2019. He followed it up with Back 2 Life (2022) and Paradise (2026). In 2020, Bunleang started releasing music under the alias of DJ Billybool focusing on a eurotrance and hardcore techno sound, so far resulting in the EP My Fantasy World (2020), the full-length debut DYR (2025) and numerous DJ mixes.

== Biography ==
Bunleang was born in Khon Kaen, Thailand. Bunleang's family moved to Sweden at age 8 after his mother became a chef in the Austrian embassy in Stockholm. In his teen years, Bunleang became involved in the city's music scene, joining what would later become Drain Gang and collaborating with local artists including Yung Lean. Early influences include Californian rapper Lil B.

In 2015, Bunleang was forced to leave Sweden by Migrationsverket and return to Thailand due to a visa dispute, settling in Bangkok. Yung Lean attempted to intervene his deportation by starting a Change.org petition and called the Swedish officials "racist assholes." Back in his home country, Bunleang began recording with local Bangkok artists such as Younggu and Dandee, while remaining a member of Drain Gang and contributing to all of their subsequent releases, including the 2019 studio album Trash Island which was partially recorded in Bunleang's Bangkok apartment and partially in a villa on Ko Pha-ngan that the group rented for the summer. Talking retrospectively about the first few years back in Thailand more than a decade later, Bunleang described the time as his "dark ages", characterized by heavy partying and a lack of direction. But they also laid the groundwork for his following musical direction by reconnecting him with EDM, especially the local strands such as 3cha.

Bunleang launched the DJ Billybool alias in late 2019, releasing DJ mixes of the Thai electronic dance music genre 3cha. He was inspired to make EDM of his own after a particularly overwhelming period in the fall of 2019: While mourning the death of a close friend, he appeared to Bunleang in a dream "show[ing] him a new way to make music". At the same time his first daughter was born. Bunleang recalled seeing her heart rate at 138 BPM (beats per minute), a tempo commonly used in eurodance. DJ Billybool's debut EP, My Fantasy World, was inspired by Basshunter and Tiësto.

In 2022, after a hiatus of three years for Thaiboy Digital, Bunleang released his second album, Back 2 Life. The album follows his journey back to music after a few quiet years, with the theme of "seven years" recurring throughout the album, signifying his determination to make up for lost time.

In 2024 Bunleang cut ties with Year0001 alongside Yung Lean and the other members of Drain Gang. He later wrote the song "Dreaming Your Reality" about the experience, singing "I'm finally free from the shackles that chain me".

After uploading Nino Lifestyle 3Cha Mix, an introduction to 3cha, in October 2024, Bunleang finally released the debut album of DJ Billybool in 2025. DYR, which blends influences from eurodance, epadunk and 3cha, and sees Bunleang sing in Swedish for the first time, has been described as "globalist hyperpop". It was revealed in a 2026 interview that Bunleang is working together with long-time collaborator Whitearmor on another 3cha-inspired project. DYR was the first full-length release on Bunleang's own record label, Bank of Star Sound System (B.O.S.S.S.).

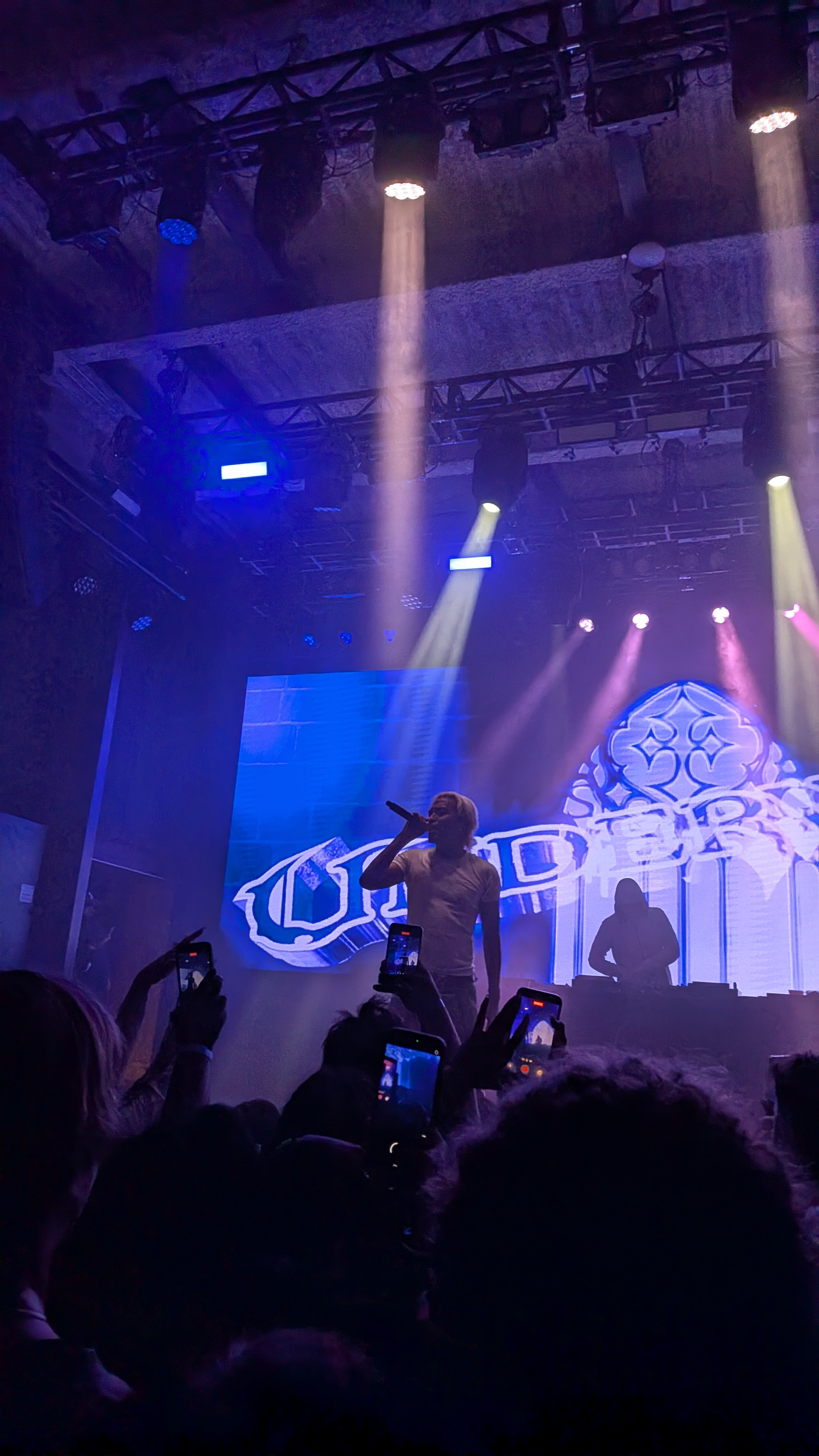
Thaiboy Digital performing the Underworld Tour in Chicago

Bunleang's third studio album as Thaiboy Digital, Paradise was released on May 8, 2026. Paradise is a collaborative effort with producer collective swedm®, consisting most likely (Note: The collective has been described as "anonymous" with online rumors surrounding the identities of the members. Other sources have simply named the three Drain Gang associates that are listed in this article.) of Eurohead, jamesjamesjames and Varg²™. The album is inspired by the dance music of urban Thailand and continues the work Bunleang has done as DJ Billybool, but moves the frame of reference from early 2000s eurotrance to the early 2010s, or, as Bunleang said, "everything before David Guetta's time". The album cover is a photo shot by Bladee of a sunset seen from Bunleang's apartment. Following the release of Paradise, Bunleang embarked on the Underworld Tour spanning nineteen concerts across North America and Europe .

== Personal life ==
Bunleang grew up with his maternal grandmother and step-grandfather in Khon Kaen. His mother, Aphantri, is half black, which caused bullying at school in Thailand. When Bunleang was five years old, his mother got a job as a chef at the Swiss embassy in Bangkok and brought him with her.

Bunleang got married on January 7, 2020 and his first child, a daughter, was born on February 9, 2020. His second daughter was born on May 1, 2024.

== Discography ==
=== As Thaiboy Digital ===
Studio albums

- 2019 – Legendary Member
- 2022 – Back 2 Life
- 2026 – Paradise (with swedm®)

Mixtapes

- 2014 – Tiger
- 2015 – Lord of Jewels (Return of the Goon)
- 2020 – Yin & Yang

Collaborative mixtapes

- 2013 – GTBSG Compilation (with Bladee, Ecco2k)
- 2016 – AvP (with Bladee)
- 2017 – D&G (with Bladee, Ecco2k)
- 2019 – Trash Island (with Bladee, Ecco2k)

Extended plays

- 2017 – S.O.S: Suicide or Sacrifice

=== As DJ Billybool ===
Studio albums

- 2025 – DYR

Mixtapes

- 2024 – EL DORADO MEGA MIX
- 2024 – TranceParty UK Mix
- 2024 – Nino Lifestyle หัวใจ บางระจัน 3Cha Mix
- 2025 – The Effect Mix

Extended plays

- 2020 – My Fantasy World
- 2023 – The Promised Future Remixes, Vol. 1

=== Guest appearances ===
- Bladee – "Ebay" (2013) (featuring Ecco2k)
- Bladee – "Deletee" (2014)
- Bladee – "Everlasting Flames" (2014)
- Bladee – "Butterfly" (2015 and 2016)
- Yung Lean – "How U Like Me Now?" (2016)
- Yung Lean – "King Cobra" (2018)
- Bladee – "Side by Side" (2018)
- Younggu – "Never Been" (2018) (featuring Twopee Southside, Rahboy)
- Woesum – "Violet Gold" (2021) (featuring Bladee, Yung Lean)
- Woesum – "Only Light" (2021)
- Woesum – Ying & Yang Remix - Remix (2021)
- Bladee – "Inspiration Comes" (2021)
- Yung Lean – "Starz2theRainbow" (2022)
- Bladee – "Requiem" (2023)
- Varg²™ – "Hitty" (2024)
- Bladee – "TL;DR" (2024)
- Bladee – "LUCKY LUKE" (2024)
