= Paradise (Thaiboy Digital and Swedm album) =

2026 album by Thaiboy Digital and Swedm

Studio album by Thaiboy Digital and Swedm®
- Released: 8 May 2026
- Genres: EDM; trance
- Length: 36:53
- Labels: Bank of Star Sound System; Swedm®
- Producer: Swedm®

Thaiboy Digital and Swedm® chronology
Back 2 Life (2022)	Paradise (2026)

Singles from Paradise
- 1. "Silk Road" Released: 6 March 2026; 2. "Euro Dollar Yen" Released: 31 March 2026; 3. "Irish Tears" Released: 17 April 2026

Paradise is a collaborative album between Thai rapper Thaiboy Digital and Swedish production collective Swedm®, including Varg²™, Eurohead, Skarp, and Jamesjamesjames. It was released on 8 May 2026 via Thaiboy Digital's own record label Bank of Star Sound System. The album would showcase a major shift in sound for Thaiboy Digital, embracing an optimistic and upbeat EDM and trance style. Three singles would be released leading up to the album, "Silk Road", "Euro Dollar Yen", and "Irish Tears".

Following the albums release, Thaiboy Digital would go on a tour of North America and Europe in promotion of the record along with Whitearmor and Eurohead.

== Reception ==
Nathan Evans of Pitchfork gave the album a 7.5, they noted the albums heavy influence from 2010's EDM, describing Swedm®'s production as splitting the atom of EDM to "find Swedish EDM’s roots in Dutch trance and Eurodance." Further, while praising much of the production work, they still felt that some of the tracks overstayed their welcome and druged up "memories of EDM’s excess." Raphael Helfand of The Fader also noted a major tonal shift from Thaiboy Digital's moodier past works in favor of an EDM-style, describing the album as "36 minutes of blissful hedonism."

== Track listing ==
Paradise track listing
No.	Title	Length
1.	"Welcome to Paradise"	0:49
2.	"Dreaming Your Reality"	2:46
3.	"Solitary" (featuring Bladee)	3:20
4.	"Zatoichi"	3:10
5.	"Come True"	2:58
6.	"Euro Dollar Yen"	2:37
7.	"Born Ready"	3:03
8.	"Irish Tears" (featuring Bladee)	4:30
9.	"Christian Louboutin"	2:19
10.	"Money Dance"	3:00
11.	"Surrendering to the Rhythm"	3:06
12.	"Silk Road"	2:33
13.	"Destiny"	2:42
Total length:		36:53
