= Legendary Member =

Studio album by Thaiboy Digital
- Released: 26 September 2019
- Genre: Cloud rap
- Length: 34:11
- Label: Year0001
- Producer: Gud; Whitearmor; RipSquad; Woesum

Thaiboy Digital chronology
Trash Island (2019)	Legendary Member (2019)	Back 2 Life (2022)

Legendary Member is the debut studio album by Thai rapper Thaiboy Digital of the Swedish music collective Drain Gang. It was released on 26 September 2019 on the record label Year0001. The album features artists Bladee, Ecco2k, and Yung Lean along with production credits from Gud, Whitearmor, Ripsquad and Woesum. It was recorded with Thaiboy Digital exchanging trips between London and Stockholm.

== Background ==
The album has Gud as executive producer, with Whitearmor, RipSquad and Woesum as co-producers. It was first announced a month before with the release of a single, "Lip Service", featuring Ecco2k, followed by the release of "Nervous" and "IDGAF". A music video for the album's title track was released in October. Thaiboy Digital later toured Australia. According to Thaiboy Digital, recording the album was one of his best experiences in a studio.

== Critical reception ==
Nadine Smith reviewed the album to Pitchfork, giving it a rating of 7.2/10. It was also reviewed by Zac Cazes of The Quietus.

== Track listing ==
All tracks are written by Thaiboy Digital.

No.	Title	Length
1.	"Drainstar Rock"	1:40
2.	"Nervous"	2:54
3.	"Can't Tell"	2:37
4.	"Kiss Me Through the Scope"	3:07
5.	"IDGAF"	3:19
6.	"Bentley" (featuring Bladee)	2:28
7.	"Kit Kat"	2:07
8.	"Lip Service" (featuring Ecco2k)	2:56
9.	"Beijing"	3:34
10.	"Spinnin"	3:41
11.	"Baby" (featuring Ecco2k)	3:08
12.	"Legendary Member" (featuring Bladee, Ecco2k and Yung Lean)	2:35
Total length:		34:06
