= Back 2 Life (Thaiboy Digital album) =

Studio album by Thaiboy Digital
- Released: 18 November 2022
- Length: 34:07
- Label: Year0001

Thaiboy Digital chronology
Legendary Member (2019)	Back 2 Life (2022)	Paradise (2026)

Professional ratings
Review scores
Source	Rating
Pitchfork	5.7/10

Back 2 Life is the second studio album by Thai rapper Thaiboy Digital, released on 18 November 2022 through Year0001. It was announced a month earlier with the release of the single "True Love" featuring Yung Lean. Dazed named it the 19th best album of the year.

== Track listing ==
No.	Title	Writer(s)	Producer(s)	Length
1.	"Dreamworld"	Cas van der Heijden; Thanapat Bunleang; Tobias Dekker	Outtatown; Loesoe	2:10
2.	"Back 2 Life"	Heijden; Rok Curkovic; Bunleang	Rok; Seal; Loesoe	3:44
3.	"All the Way" (featuring Yung Lean and Bladee)	Benjamin Reichwald; Jonatan Leandoer; Curkovic; Bunleang	Rok; Seal	3:15
4.	"Angel"	Heijden; Bunleang	Loesoe	3:00
5.	"Alive"	Heijden; Bunleang; Timur Tokdemir	Mechatok; Loesoe	2:49
6.	"Love Potion"	Heijden; Bunleang	Loesoe	1:59
7.	"Fate"	Heijden; Bunleang	Loesoe; Seal	3:00
8.	"True Love" (featuring Yung Lean)	Jonah Abraham; Leandoer; Curkovic; Bunleang	Rok; Abhraham	3:40
9.	"The Kingdom" (featuring Bladee)	Reichwald; Luis Cano; Bunleang	Lusi	2:04
10.	"3 Star Reunite" (featuring Bladee)	Reichwald; Curkovic; Bunleang	Rok	3:36
11.	"Mr. CEO"	Cano; Bunleang	Lusi	2:34
12.	"Never Change"	Ludwig Rosenberg; Bunleang	Whitearmor	2:12
Total length:				34:08
