= Terrified (Fakemink album) =

Studio album by Fakemink
- Released: 22 May 2026
- Genre: Cloud rap
- Length: 55:33
- Label: EtnaVeraVela
- Producer: Fakemink

Fakemink chronology
The Boy Who Cried Terrified (2026)	Terrified (2026)

Singles from Terrified
- 1. "Night , Blooming Jasmine ." Released: 17 April 2026

Professional ratings
Review scores
Source	Rating
NME	4/5 stars
Pitchfork	6.3/10

Terrified (stylised as Terrified .) is the debut studio album by English rapper Fakemink. It was released on 22 May 2026.

== Track listing ==
All tracks are written by Vincenzo Camille a.k.a. Fakemink, Roshina Coleman, and Tina Temps, except where noted; all tracks are produced by Fakemink.

No.	Title	Writer(s)	Length
1.	"Terrified ."		1:31
2.	"All Eyes on Me"		3:17
3.	"Playlist ."		2:38
4.	"Creep"		2:19
5.	"Like a Virgin"		2:34
6.	"Jungle-Affair ."	Camille; Coleman; Temps; Valeria Timbalari	1:37
7.	"51 Ttashpel Pony Ave ."	Camille; Coleman; Temps; Jackson Foote; Julia Capello	2:05
8.	"Hard Candy"		2:22
9.	"Rewind"		2:31
10.	"Essex Girls ."		2:50
11.	"Night , Blooming Jasmine ."		2:58
12.	"Wrong Relief"		2:21
13.	"Fire & Ice ."		7:02
14.	"Kiss of Death"		2:52
15.	"Creed ."		2:56
16.	"Tell Me What You're Missing ."		2:32
17.	"Forget Me Not ."		3:09
18.	"Rétard Angel ."	Camille; Coleman; Temps; Alexander Crossan; Tirzah Mastin	2:52
19.	"Etna ."		4:57
Total length:			55:33

== Charts ==
Chart performance for Terrified
Chart (2026)	Peak position
Australian Albums (ARIA)	90
Australian Hip Hop/R&B Albums (ARIA)	17
Irish Independent Albums (IRMA)	16
New Zealand Albums (RMNZ)	40
