= LV Sandals =

2025 single by EsDeeKid, Fakemink and Rico Ace

Single by EsDeeKid, Fakemink and Rico Ace

from the album Rebel
- Released: 6 February 2025
- Genre: UK rap; UK underground; jerk; trap
- Length: 1:51
- Label: XV; Lizzy
- Songwriters: EsDeeKid; Vincenzo Camille; Rico Ace
- Producer: Wraith9

EsDeeKid singles chronology
"Warmin' Up" (2024)	"LV Sandals" (2025)	"Phantom" (2025)

Fakemink singles chronology
"I'm Dead" (2025)	"LV Sandals" (2025)	"Face to Face" (2025)

Rico Ace singles chronology
"Gettin' It In" (2024)	"LV Sandals" (2025)	"Phantom" (2025)

Music video
- "LV Sandals" on YouTube

"LV Sandals" is a song by English rappers EsDeeKid, Fakemink and Rico Ace, released on 6 February 2025 as the lead single from EsDeeKid's debut studio album, Rebel (2025). It went viral on the video-sharing app TikTok, following which it became one of his breakout hits along with his songs "Phantom" and "4 Raws".

== Composition ==
The song contains a distorted lo-fi beat with "inexorable rhythmic force". It features verses from EsDeeKid and Rico Ace, while Fakemink performs the chorus, in which he stutters "L-L-L-Louis V sandals".

== Critical reception ==
GRM Daily described the song to be "featuring thorough flows and some forward-thinking production." The Guardian praised the song's line "In a kush coma, EsDeeKid fried, I'm a fookin' stoner", commenting it is "as satisfying an opening line as you're likely to hear this year, Merseyside musicality emanating from every word."

== Charts ==
Chart performance for "LV Sandals"
Chart (2025–2026)	Peak position
Australia (ARIA)	90
Australia Hip Hop/R&B (ARIA)	12
Canada (Canadian Hot 100)	83
Czech Republic Singles Digital (ČNS IFPI)	65
Greece International (IFPI)	42
Ireland (IRMA)	80
Latvia Streaming (LaIPA)	13
Lithuania (AGATA)	10
Slovakia Singles Digital (ČNS IFPI)	42
UK Singles (Official Charts)	99
UK Hip Hop/R&B (Official Charts)	8
UK Indie (Official Charts)	12
US Bubbling Under Hot 100 (Billboard)	9
US Hot R&B/Hip-Hop Songs (Billboard)	23

== Certifications ==
Certifications for "LV Sandals"
Region	Certification	Certified units/sales
New Zealand (RMNZ)	Gold	15,000^{‡}
^{‡} Sales+streaming figures based on certification alone.
