= Federal (SINN6R album) =

2025 album by SINN6R

#FEDERAL

Studio album by SINN6R, Honzza
- Released: November 21, 2025
- Genres: UK rap; trap
- Length: 18:32
- Labels: XV; Lizzy
- Producers: Cppo; js31; rameyvzk; Varg2TM; wtfriko_; wunof1ne; zoja

Singles from FEDERAL
- 1. "Personally" Released: October 8, 2025; 2. "Chilli" Released: October 22, 2025; 3. "Label Dinner" Released: November 21, 2025; 4. "Me & You" Released: November 21, 2025

#FEDERAL (stylized in all caps) is the second studio album by English rapper SINN6R, released on November 21, 2025, through XV and Lizzy Records. The album's production was handled by various producers, including Cppo, js31, Rameyvzk, Varg²™, Wtfriko_, Wunof1ne, and zoja. The album also features guest appearances from TeeboFG, Rico Ace, and Ledbyher. #FEDERAL is a trap-inspired album, which is characterized by its hedonistic and materialistic flows. The album's lead single, "Personally," was released on October 8, 2025. Upon release, #FEDERAL received critical acclaim amongst the underground rap scene.

A deluxe version of the album, #FEDERAL++, was released on March 12, 2026, featuring four extra songs and a feature from British rapper Lancey Foux.

== Composition ==
Federal is a trap-inspired album. According to Olivier Lafontant of Pitchfork, the project follows SINN6R's Opium-indebted mania of July's 2Often, which he described as being “marred by hamfisted hooks and DRACO.FM-type beats.” In contrast, Lafontant praised #FEDERAL for its progression in sound and execution, noting that the album is "more refined and distinct," and describing it as "full of trap-inspired hellscapes that spotlight his dexterous flows." Additionally, according to Davy Reed of The Face, he wrote how the album's sound has been described as heavily distorted and abrasive, with SINN6R delivering his verses with a cold, precise vocal style over aggressive drill-influenced production.

== Critical reception ==
Professional ratings
Review scores
Source	Rating
Pitchfork	8.0/10

Federal received critical acclaim, with Olivier Lafontant highlighting SINN6R's vocal presence, writing that the rapper's delivery is "bulldozing" and occupies much of the album's sonic space, contributing to an atmosphere that feels "nearly suffocating". The review also emphasized the album's vivid lyricism, with Lafontant noting SINN6R's ability to condense detailed narratives into single lines while maintaining a confrontational and self-assured tone. This balance between technical precision and abrasive confidence was cited as a defining feature of the record and a key factor in its impact within the UK underground rap scene. On "Me & You", featuring UK underground artist TeeboFG, SINN6R emphasizes his commitment to hedonism and escapism. On the hook, he contrasts violence with indulgence, rapping, "I pop pills, don't pop shells... I like raving," underscoring the track's focus on pleasure and excess. On the track "Personally", SINN6R presents a darker, more nihilistic perspective. Drawing influence from the US drill scene before Ilford producer 808Melo's sliding 808 innovations, SINN6R delivers narratives of street-level crime and childhood hardship with a disciplined, militaristic cadence reminiscent of an army drill sergeant.

== Charts ==
Chart performance for Federal
Chart (2026)	Peak position
UK Independent Albums Breakers (OCC)	18
UK R&B Albums (Official Charts)	11
