= Varg (band) =

German metal band

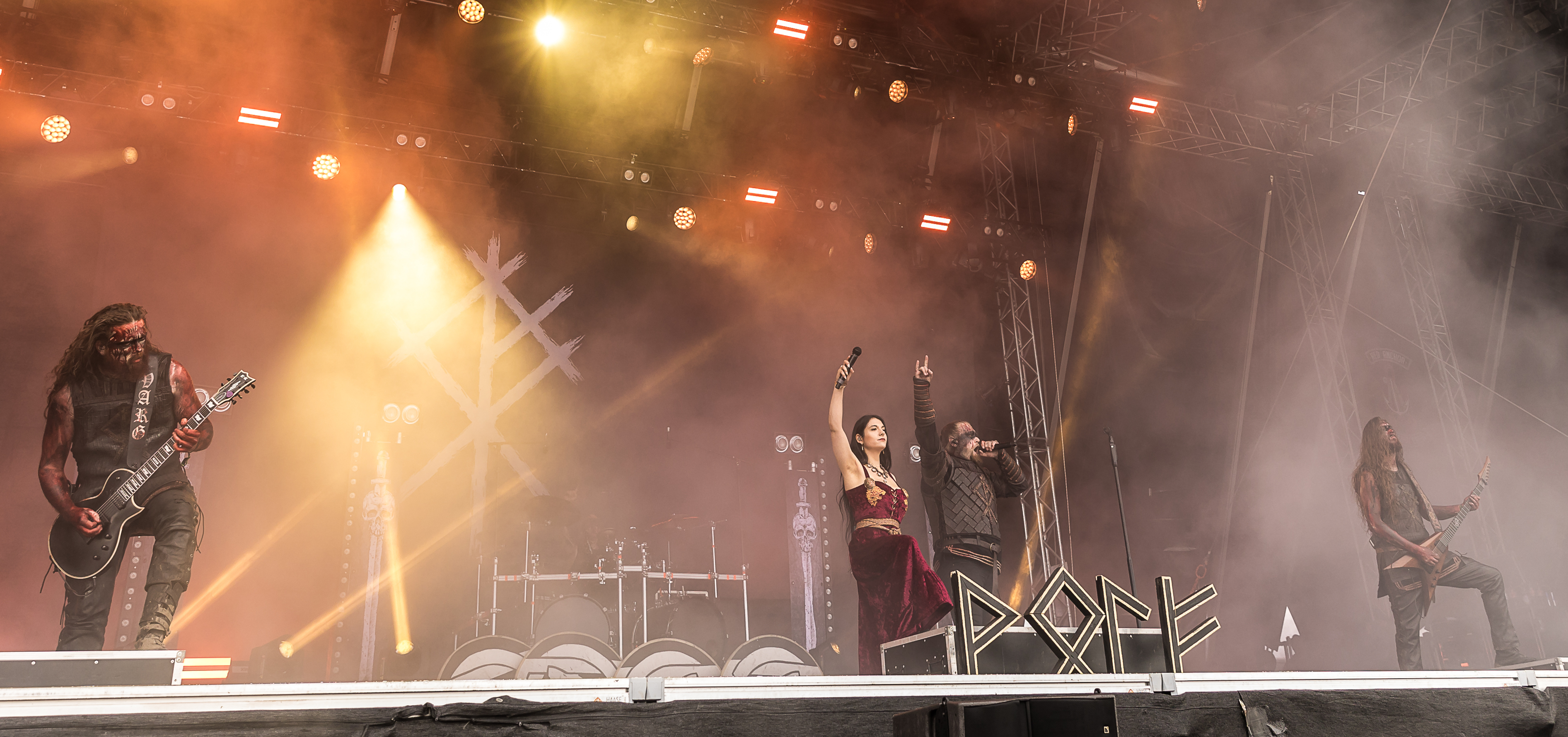
- Varg at Rockharz Open Air 2024

Background information
- Origin: Coburg, Bavaria, Germany
- Genres: Viking metal; melodic death metal; pagan metal; black metal (early)
- Years active: 2005–present
- Labels: Napalm, NoiseArt
- Members: Philipp "Freki" Seiler; Silvester "Fenrier" Grundmann; Zasch "Hati"; Jaqueline Toth "Fylgja"
- Past members: Timo "Managarm"; Basti "Draugr"; Thomas "Skoll" Winkelmann; Sebastian "Geri" Feick; Martin "Skalli" "Da'ath" "Frost" "Nivel"
- Website: varg.de

Varg is a German metal band from Coburg, Bavaria. The name means "wolf" in Swedish, and the band refers to its music as "wolf metal". The band's songs deal mainly with paganism and Nordic mythology.

== History ==
The band's logo

Varg was formed in 2005 in Coburg, Bavaria, by guitarist Philipp "Freki" Seiler and drummer Silvester "Fenrier" Grundmann. They were joined by bassist Nivel, vocalist Frost and guitarist Da'ath. In 2019, they issued a cease-and-desist letter to a Swedish techno artist of the same name, who had to change his pseudonym to Varg²™.

== Discography ==
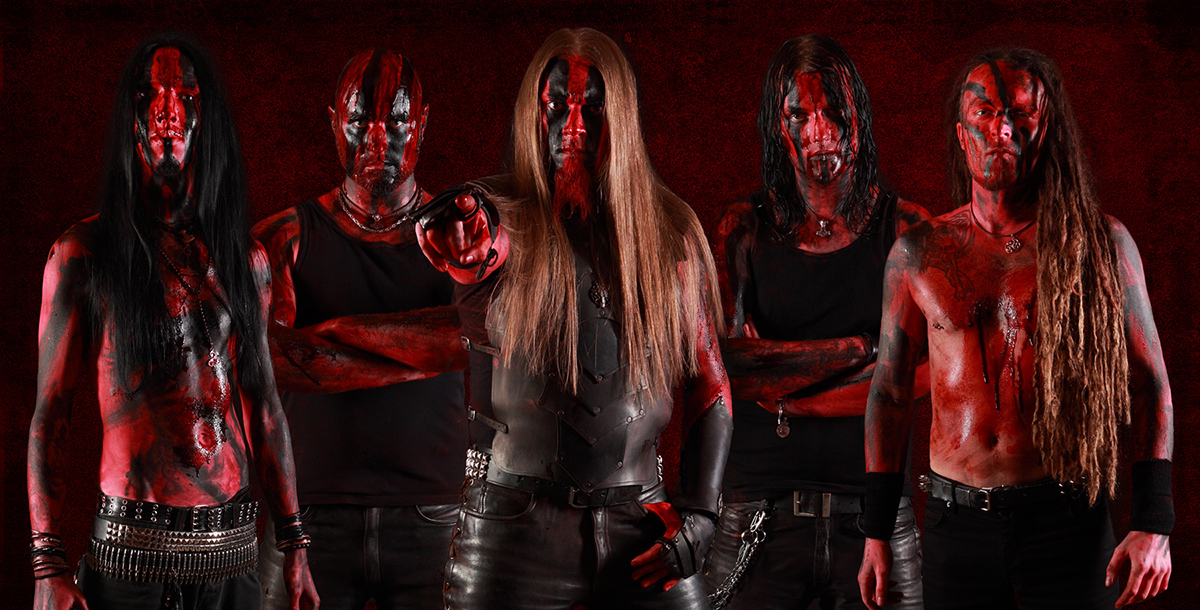
Official band photo, 2011

=== Demos ===
- 2006: Donareiche

=== Studio albums ===
- 2007: Wolfszeit (Heiden Klangwerke)
- 2008: Schildfront (split with Minas Morgul)
- 2008: Live am Wolfszeit Festival (live album)
- 2010: Blutaar (NoiseArt Records)
- 2011: Wolfskult (NoiseArt Records)
- 2012: Guten Tag (NoiseArt Records)
- 2016: Das Ende aller Lügen (Napalm Records)
- 2019: Wolfszeit II (Wolf Metal Records)
- 2020: Zeichen (Napalm Records)
- 2023: Ewige Wacht (Napalm Records)

=== EPs ===
- 2012: Legacy
- 2015: Rotkäppchen (Napalm Records)
- 2017: Götterdämmerung (Napalm Records)

=== Singles ===
- October 2022: Schildfront (Napalm Records)
- August 2023: Immer treu (Napalm Records)
