= Ursviken =

- Location within Västerbotten Location within Sweden
- Coordinates: 64°42′29″N 21°10′34″E
- Country: Sweden
- Province: Västerbotten
- County: Västerbotten County
- Municipality: Skellefteå Municipality

Area
  - Total: 3.72 km^{2} (1.44 sq mi)

Population (31 December 2010)
  - Total: 3,977
  - Density: 1,070/km^{2} (2,800/sq mi)
- Time zone: UTC+1 (CET)
  - Summer (DST): UTC+2 (CEST)

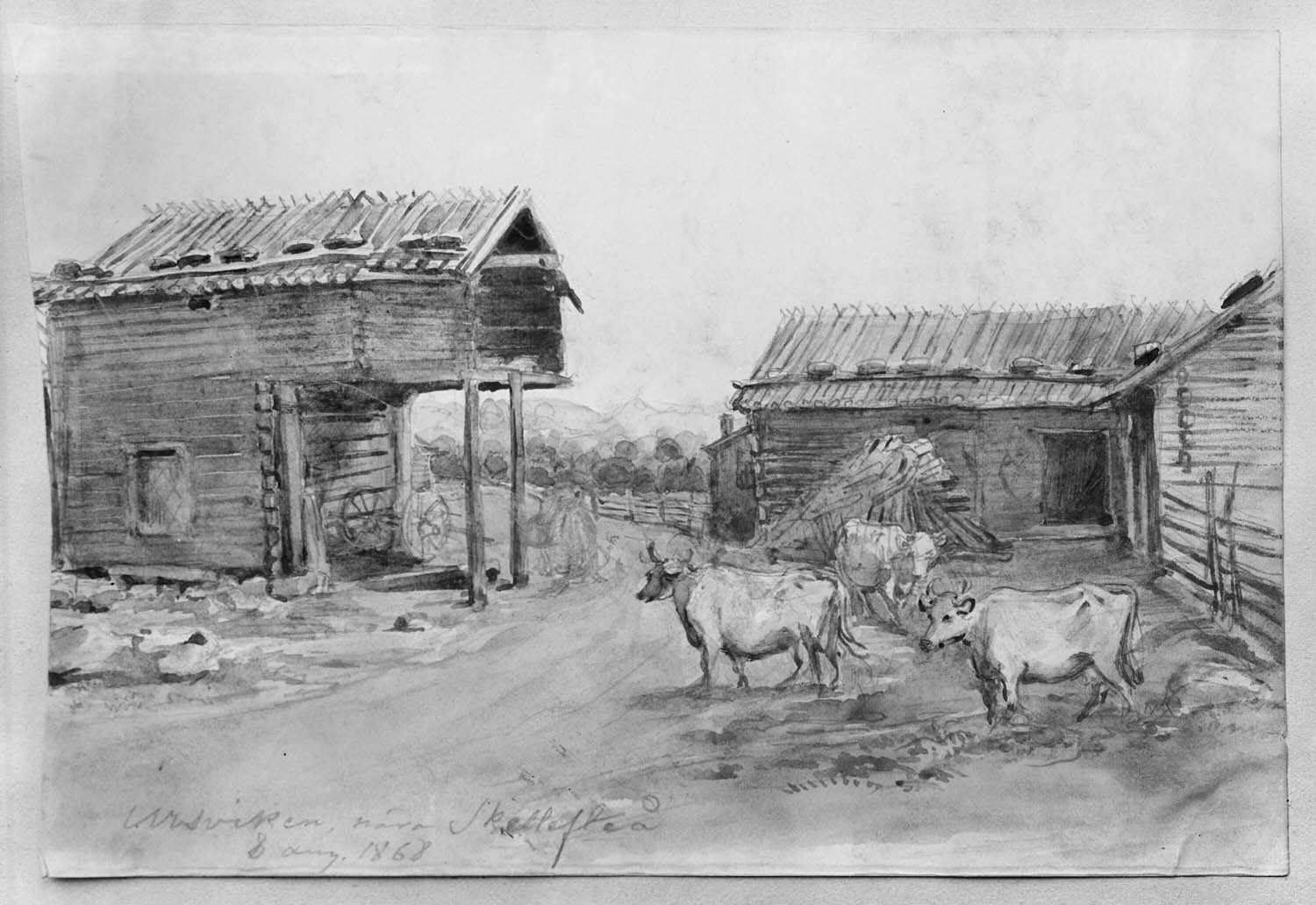
Buildings in Ursviken, by Fritz von Dardel 1868.

Ursviken (Swedish pronunciation: [ˈʉ̂ːʂˌviːkɛn]) is a locality situated in Skellefteå Municipality, Västerbotten County, Sweden with 3,977 inhabitants in 2010.
