= Easter Pink =

Single by Fakemink
- Released: 17 January 2025
- Genre: UK hip-hop; cloud rap; electroclash; electropop
- Length: 1:24
- Label: EtnaVeraVela
- Songwriter: Vincenzo Camille
- Producer: Suzy Sheer

Music video
- "Easter Pink" on YouTube

"Easter Pink" is a song by British rapper Fakemink. It was released as a single on 17 January 2025, through EtnaVeraVela. Produced by electronic duo Suzy Sheer, the song draws influences from cloud rap, bloghouse, and electroclash. The song received critical acclaim and contributed to Fakemink's popularity, as well as the broader popularity of the UK Underground scene.

== Music and production ==
"Easter Pink" was produced by electronic duo Suzy Sheer, who had previously collaborated with Snow Strippers and the online rap collective Surf Gang. Suzy Sheer's sound has been compared to blog-era music genres such as bloghouse, with Pitchfork's Walden Green describing their production on the song as "bloghouse meets cloud rap." Shaad D'Souza of The Guardian described the song's production as sounding like "euphoric flips of songs from the Skins soundtrack", feeling it "could pass for a mid-2000s indie dance hit if not for Fakemink's fast, very 2020s rapping", with additional comparisons to British indie rock band Bloc Party.

== Reception ==
"Easter Pink" received acclaim from music critics, who often praised its production and performance. Pitchfork ranked it as one of the "best new tracks" of 2025, with Green feeling that the song was made more captivating "by its supremely teenage gawkiness, the sense of something great discovering itself," comparing it to a clip of MGMT performing "Friends" while students at Wesleyan University. Music reviewer Shaad D'Souza gave it a similar ranking, noting that in theory, Fakemink "should be of a piece with the 2020s class of overstimulating Gen Z internet rappers such as Nettspend and OsamaSon. But although he is, in some sense, part of that scene, his music is also far more linear and melodic, and more indebted to the past."

Racket included the song on their Spotify playlist, with staff writer Keith Harris picking it "not so much for [Fakemink's] rhymes as for how the electroclashy throb that NYC production duo Suzy Sheer provides compliments his brash flow." Clash critic Robin Murray lauded its production, which he noted was done "with a verve and sense of style that prevents this being some sleazy retrograde step", as well as Fakemink's performance, which Murray called "87 seconds of blunt force charisma – the flows are sheer London, but there's a universality to tongue-in-cheek arrogance that fuels 'Easter Pink'". GRM Daily wrote that the song's release shows that Fakemink "continues to carve a unique lane for himself in the rap game," while Chris DeVille of Stereogum "[couldn't] wait to see him perform it at the Fader Fort."
