= Phantom (EsDeeKid and Rico Ace song) =

2025 single by EsDeeKid and Rico Ace

Single by EsDeeKid and Rico Ace

from the album Rebel
- Released: 7 March 2025
- Genre: UK rap; trap; jerk
- Length: 1:49
- Label: XV; Lizzy
- Songwriter: EsDeeKid
- Producer: Wraith9

EsDeeKid singles chronology
"LV Sandals" (2025)	"Phantom" (2025)	"4 Raws" (2025)

Rico Ace singles chronology
"LV Sandals" (2025)	"Phantom" (2025)	"Cali Man" (2025)

Music video
- "Phantom" on YouTube

"Phantom" is a song by English rappers EsDeeKid and Rico Ace, released on 7 March 2025 as the second single from the former's debut mixtape, Rebel (2025). Considered to be a sleeper hit, it went viral on the video-sharing app TikTok, following which it became one of EsDeeKid's breakout hits along with his songs "LV Sandals" and "4 Raws".

== Composition ==
The beat of the song is marked by "stop-and-slow drums", in addition to "haunting Digitone synth lines and blown-out 808s layered over hard trap and off-kilter Jerk grooves". In his signature thick scouse accent, EsDeeKid raps about the pressures of living in an inner-city environment.

== Critical reception ==
The Guardian described that the song's lyrics "come with catarrh-loosening k's, as if he's gobbing the words on to the pavement". Antonio Johri of Complex commented that the song has "some of the most intense, ear-catching beats in hip-hop" and "EsDee fires off bars like he's got endless breath, talking his shit while repping his hometown."

== Commercial performance ==
According to Luminate, the song earned 2.98 million official on-demand U.S. streams in the week of 14–20 November.

== Charts ==
Chart performance for "Phantom"
Chart (2025–2026)	Peak position
Australia (ARIA)	21
Australia Hip Hop/R&B (ARIA)	3
Austria (Ö3 Austria Top 40)	47
Canada (Canadian Hot 100)	35
Czech Republic Singles Digital (ČNS IFPI)	14
Finland (Suomen virallinen lista)	45
Germany (GfK)	81
Global 200 (Billboard)	85
Greece International (IFPI)	15
Ireland (IRMA)	15
Latvia Streaming (LaIPA)	4
Lithuania (AGATA)	1
Netherlands (Single Top 100)	89
New Zealand (Recorded Music NZ)	30
Norway (IFPI Norge)	59
Poland (Polish Streaming Top 100)	44
Portugal (AFP)	200
Slovakia Singles Digital (ČNS IFPI)	19
Sweden (Sverigetopplistan)	87
Switzerland (Schweizer Hitparade)	36
UK Singles (Official Charts)	12
UK Indie (Official Charts)	2
UK Hip Hop/R&B (Official Charts)	2
US Billboard Hot 100	67
US Hot R&B/Hip-Hop Songs (Billboard)	14

== Certifications ==
Certifications
Region	Certification	Certified units/sales
Australia (ARIA)	Gold	35,000^{‡}
New Zealand (RMNZ)	Gold	15,000^{‡}
Poland (ZPAV)	Gold	62,500^{‡}
United Kingdom (BPI)	Gold	400,000^{‡}
^{‡} Sales+streaming figures based on certification alone.
