= EsDeeKid =

British rapper

- Origin: Liverpool, England
- Genres: UK underground rap; cloud rap; trap; jerk
- Occupation: Rapper
- Works: Discography
- Years active: 2023–present

EsDeeKid is a British rapper from Liverpool, England. He released his debut mixtape, Rebel, in June 2025. He has been noted as a prominent figure in the UK underground rap scene. His music is characterised by his thick Scouse accent and draws inspiration from cloud rap. He covers his face with a balaclava, and keeps his name, appearance, and age private. He still lives in his council house. As of May 2026, EsDeeKid's single "Phantom" (with Rico Ace) has accumulated more than 300 million streams. His mixtape Rebel has charted in multiple European countries, as well as peaked at number 23 on the US Billboard 200, despite being released nearly five months before its debut on the chart.

His initial virality led to memes and jokes of EsDeeKid being Timothée Chalamet's alter ego due to the two sharing similar physical appearances. They later collaborated on a remix of EsDeeKid's song "4 Raws".

== Background ==
EsDeeKid originates from Liverpool. He performs with his face concealed by a balaclava and has not publicly disclosed his real name, age or detailed biographical information. Both interviews and reviews note that he rarely breaks character in public, maintaining an anonymous persona centred on dark visuals and minimal personal exposure.

His accent has been singled out by critics as one of his defining characteristics, helping to distinguish him within the wider field of UK rap. The Guardian's "Add to playlist" column described him as having a "magnificent Scouse accent" and "entertainingly debauched lyrics", noting his rapid rise from Liverpool's underground scene. Dazed interviewed fans who have highlighted his menacing stage presence, all-black clothing and masked image as central to his appeal.

== Career ==
=== 2023–2024: Early releases and recognition ===
EsDeeKid's first known song was a feature on "Altered" by DualSpines, released in 2023. He began releasing standalone music in May 2024, releasing a remix of "Black Beatles" by Rae Sremmurd on SoundCloud. Other non-album singles he released include "Apathy", "Slurricane" (with Fakemink), "Number (N)ine Freestyle", "Gracias", "Palaces" (with Rico Ace), "Tapped In" (with SINN6R), "Ferragamo", "Bally" (with Rico Ace), "Little Kidda" and "Warmin' Up".

His 2024 single "Bally" featuring Rico Ace was highlighted in Pitchfork's "The Ones" column, where Alphonse Pierre described it as one of the year's standout tracks and named EsDeeKid one of the year's breakout stars. The song received international success and established his partnership with Rico Ace, who would later appear on some of his best-known tracks.

=== 2025: Rebel and commercial breakthrough ===
His debut mixtape, Rebel, was released on 20 June 2025 through Lizzy Records. The project included the singles "LV Sandals", "5am", and "Phantom" alongside 8 other original tracks. Rebel charted in the United Kingdom, Ireland, and several other European countries, reaching number 16 on the UK Albums Chart and appearing on national album charts in Austria, Belgium, Finland, Lithuania, the Netherlands, Norway, Sweden, and Switzerland. His monthly listeners on streaming platforms such as Spotify and YouTube also increased significantly.

As of March 2026, EsDeekid's most listened-to track on Spotify is "Phantom" (featuring Rico Ace). Since its release in March 2025, it has amassed over 300 million streams.

==== Live performances ====
Following the release of Rebel, EsDeeKid launched his European tour in 2025, performing in the United Kingdom and continental Europe. Dazed described the run of dates as "career-defining", reporting that he rounded off the tour with a show at the Electric Ballroom in Camden Town, London. The Face described his London date on the Rebel tour as "legendary", highlighting intense mosh pits, a riotous atmosphere and fans showing up early to see his first major headline show in the city.

His shows prominently feature a heavy, almost rock-influenced live energy, with dark lighting, frequent moshing and EsDeeKid often appearing as a shadowy figure at the centre of the stage.

He is scheduled to embark on the "Council House Rat Tour" with Rico Ace in North America and Europe, beginning on 12 September 2026 in Charlotte, North Carolina and concluding on 11 December 2026 in Liverpool, England.

== Identity speculation ==
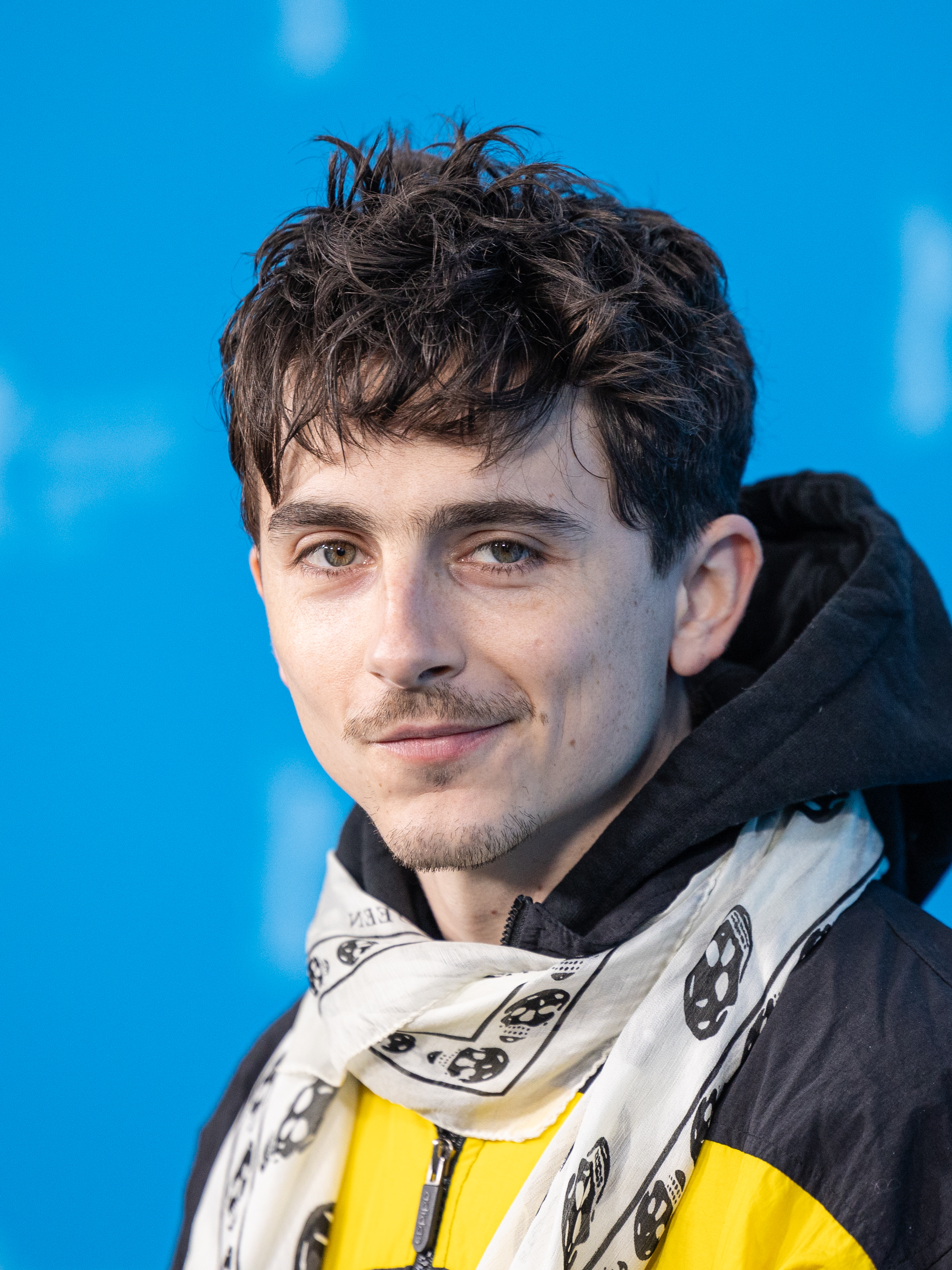
EsDeeKid has a physical resemblance to American actor Timothée Chalamet.

In November 2025, rumours began to circulate on TikTok that EsDeeKid's actual identity was American-French actor Timothée Chalamet, with internet users noting correlations between articles of clothing and physical similarities. The theory was widely reported in music and entertainment media, and became the subject of think pieces about anonymity in popular music and the role of online speculation in shaping artist narratives. However, pieces of investigative journalism indicated that a link between EsDeeKid and Chalamet was unlikely, citing an October 2025 concert in Milan that EsDeeKid performed while Chalamet was reported to be in New York City. Chalamet fuelled these rumours in a December 2025 interview with Heart FM, saying: "I got no comment on that. ... Two words: all will be revealed in due time." He later posted a snippet of a music video for a remix of EsDeeKid's single "4 Raws", featuring a rap verse from Chalamet himself, on his Twitter account.

Other rumours surrounding his identity have alleged that EsDeeKid previously went under the alias DualSpines, noting significant correlations between his and EsDeeKid's vocals on "Altered", released on December 11, 2023 through DualSpines' Soundcloud account.

In February 2026, Liverpool rapper Mazza L20 posted a picture on Instagram that he claimed showed the face of EsDeeKid, following a dispute over a song Mazza had released featuring him.

== Musical style ==
EsDeeKid's music combines elements of cloud rap and trap, with atmospheric, lo-fi production and heavy bass underpinning his delivery. His lyrics often centre on drug use, especially nightlife, relationships and designer fashion, themes that The Guardian described as "entertainingly debauched". Critics have noted that, although his subject matter can be repetitive, his vocal timbre, phrasing and accent make his performances distinctive.

Rebel was described by Tastemakers Music Magazine as drawing heavily on cloud-rap textures, with hazy synths and reverb-heavy beats that provide a backdrop for his slurred, melodic flows. Dazed and The Fader have situated him within a broader new underground of UK rap artists who move beyond drill into more experimental, internet-influenced sounds.

His collaborations with fellow underground artists such as Fakemink, Rico Ace and Fimiguerrero further root him in this scene, pairing his vocals with distorted, bass-heavy beats and unconventional song structures.

== Reception ==
EsDeeKid has received attention from a range of music publications. Pitchfork highlighted "Bally" as one of its "The Ones" picks and described him as a breakout artist for 2024.

In The Guardian's "Add to playlist" column, Ben Beaumont-Thomas and Laura Snapes praised his "magnificent scouse accent" and the energy of his tracks, particularly the single "LV Sandals", and compared his appeal to artists such as Playboi Carti. The Face has covered both his recorded output and live shows, describing his Rebel tour as "legendary" and noting the rapid growth of his streaming numbers and fanbase.

Dazed has devoted multiple features to EsDeeKid, profiling his fan community and positioning him within a lineage of artists with concealed identities. One article linked his popularity to the intrigue surrounding his anonymity.

Complex labeled EsDeeKid as the 14th best artist on their 100 Hottest Rappers Right Now in April 2026, with writer Antonio Johri writing how EsDeeKid is the de facto leader in the globally surging underground UK rap scene.

EsDeeKid was also featured on the cover of a magazine shoot for i-D.

On May 13, 2026, it was announced that EsDeeKid will be getting his own skin and song added into the popular video game Fortnite. It was released on May 15, 2026.

== Discography ==
- Rebel (2025)

== Awards and nominations ==
Organization	Year	Category	Nominated work	Result	Ref.
Berlin Music Video Awards	2026	Best Low Budget	"Century"	Nominated	
BRIT Awards	2026	British Breakthrough Artist	Himself	Nominated	
