= 4 Raws =

2025 single by EsDeeKid

Single by EsDeeKid

from the album Rebel
- Released: 20 June 2025
- Genre: UK underground rap; gangsta rap; drill
- Length: 2:26
- Label: XV; Lizzy
- Songwriters: EsDeeKid; Harley Riecansky
- Producer: Wraith9

EsDeeKid singles chronology
"Phantom" (2025)	"4 Raws" (2025)	"Cali Man" (2025)

"4 Raws" is a song by English rapper EsDeeKid and the third single from his debut mixtape, Rebel (2025). Considered to be a sleeper hit, it went viral on the video-sharing app TikTok, following which it became one of his breakout hits along with his songs "LV Sandals" and "Phantom".

== Composition ==
The song finds EsDeeKid rapping about his past, substance use and persona over a gritty beat. Stylistically, it has been compared to Music by Playboi Carti.

== Critical reception ==
Nathan Evans of Dazed wrote "Whether he's barking at the beat or slouching back, he uses every harsh quality of the accent to his advantage. 'I'm a burden, I'm a scumbag / I was raised in Liverpool's slums, lad,' he spits out on '4 Raws'. From the way he delivers it, you can tell he wouldn't have it any other way."

== Commercial performance ==
According to Luminate, the song earned over three million official on-demand U.S. streams in the week of November 14–20. On December 22, the song charted on the Billboard Hot 100 chart, making its debut at number 95.

During the tracking week ending January 24, 2026, the song reached a new peak at #28 on the Hot 100.

== Legacy ==
Professional wrestler Leon Slater debuted the song as his entrance theme music during the 2026 edition of Total Nonstop Action Wrestling (TNA)'s No Surrender event, and has since continued using it as his theme music.

=== Usage in media ===
The song was later added to the popular battle royale game, Fortnite, where “4 Raws” can be purchased in the EsDeeKid bundle for 3400 Vbucks or bought separately for 500 Vbucks. The song was later added to the NBA 2K27 video game. On the release day of GTA VI, it was revealed that the remix for "4 Raws" has been added to the game's soundtrack.

== Remixes ==
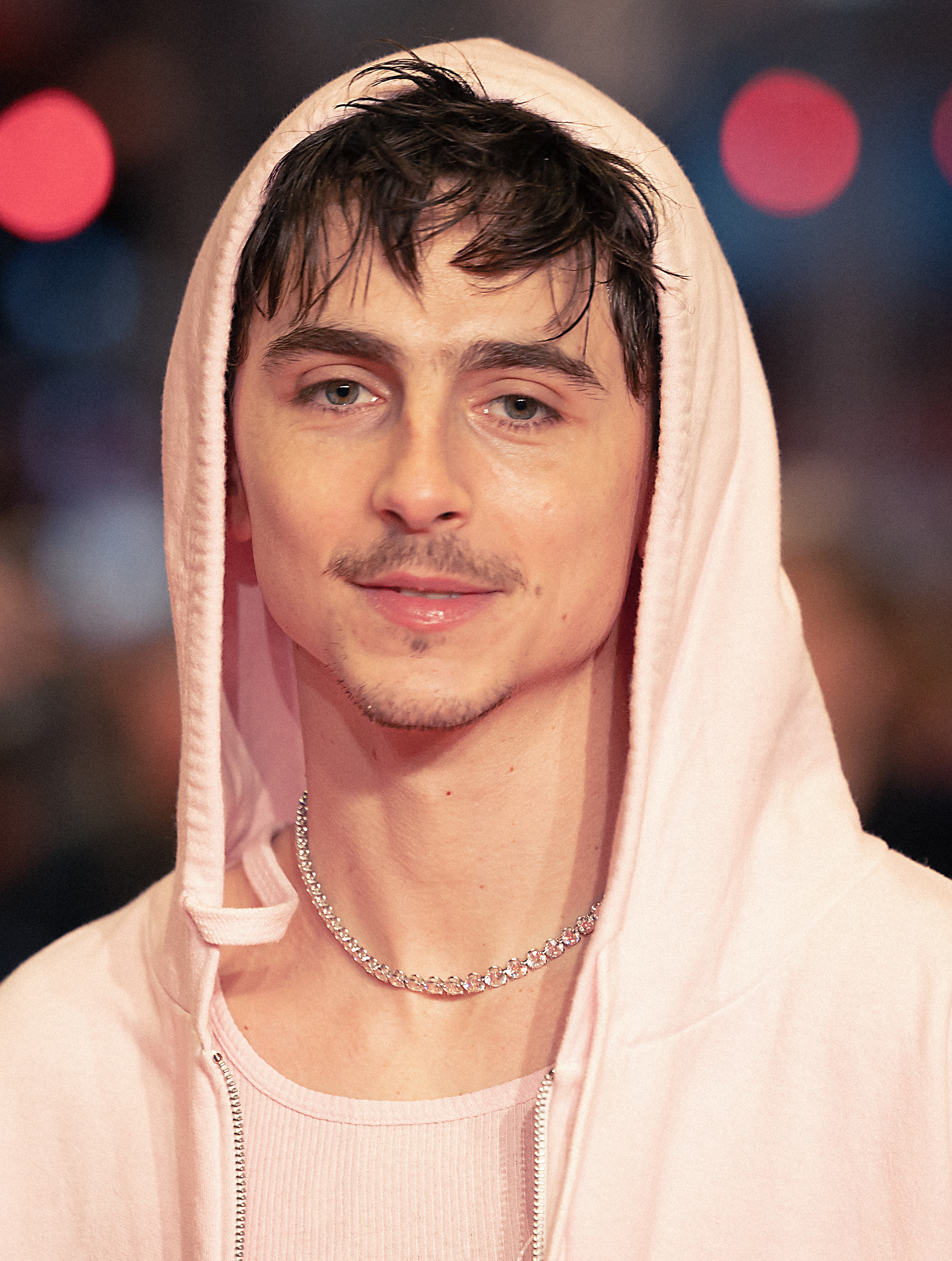
Timothée Chalamet contributed to the remix by having a full verse.

On 19 December 2025, despite not being released onto streaming platforms, EsDeeKid followed through with a surprise release of the remix for the track, which saw him feature the actor Timothée Chalamet on the track following the viral speculation that EsDeeKid was Chalamet in disguise, debunking that theory.

On 31 December 2025, the Chainsmokers released their version of a remix which garnered overwhelmingly negative reviews. EsDeeKid responded via X stating his discontent by saying the track was "getting NUKED", and shortly after was taken down from SoundCloud, as well as made private on YouTube.

== Charts ==
Chart performance for "4 Raws"
Chart (2025–2026)	Peak position
Australia (ARIA)	21
Australia Hip Hop/R&B (ARIA)	4
Austria (Ö3 Austria Top 40)	67
Canada (Canadian Hot 100)	26
Czech Republic Singles Digital (ČNS IFPI)	28
Global 200 (Billboard)	38
Greece International (IFPI)	9
Ireland (IRMA)	26
Latvia Streaming (LaIPA)	4
Lithuania (AGATA)	5
New Zealand (Recorded Music NZ)	28
Norway (IFPI Norge)	84
Poland (Polish Streaming Top 100)	66
Portugal (AFP)	143
Slovakia Singles Digital (ČNS IFPI)	33
Sweden Heatseeker (Sverigetopplistan)	4
Switzerland (Schweizer Hitparade)	57
UK Singles (Official Charts)	20
UK Hip Hop/R&B (Official Charts)	3
UK Independent (Official Charts)	4
US Billboard Hot 100	28
US Hot R&B/Hip-Hop Songs (Billboard)	8

== Certifications ==
Certifications
Region	Certification	Certified units/sales
Australia (ARIA)	Gold	35,000^{‡}
New Zealand (RMNZ)	Gold	15,000^{‡}
^{‡} Sales+streaming figures based on certification alone.
