= Varg²™ =

Swedish electronic musician

- Born: Jonas Rönnberg; Ursviken, Sweden
- Genres: electronic; techno; ambient
- Occupations: Record producer; DJ
- Labels: Northern Electronics; Posh Isolation; Cease 2 Exist; Year0001

Jonas Rönnberg, known by his stage name Varg²™ and previously as Varg, is a Swedish electronic musician.

== Career ==
Rönnberg grew up in the small village of Ursviken in northern Sweden.

In 2017, he released the studio album Nordic Flora Series, Pt. 3: Gore-Tex City, which contained features from Yung Lean and Chloe Wise and which he described as his "most honest and personal work to date". In 2018, Rönnberg offered the EP **** *** ****** in exchange for donations to children affected by the Yemeni civil war. Rönnberg previously used the pseudonym "Varg", but had to change it to "Varg²™" in 2019 following a cease and desist from the German band of the same name. Following his name change, he released the EP Body of Carbon in collaboration with Croatian Amor, and later the EP Fuck Varg.

In April 2024, he released the track "Is There a Place in Heaven for Boys like Me?" with musicians Skrillex and Bladee. It appeared on Rönnberg's album Nordic Flora Series, Part 6: Outlaw Music. In April 2025, Rönnberg made a guest appearance on Skrillex's Fuck U Skrillex alongside Whitearmor and Fred again, which was nominated for Best Dance/Electronic Album at the 68th Annual Grammy Awards. In November 2025, he managed production on SINN6R's #FEDERAL alongside Zoja and Cppo. Writing for Pitchfork, critic Olivier Lafontant described the project as featuring "trap-inspired hellscapes".

In 2026, Rönnberg produced the studio album Get Out Of My Head for PureSnow.
