= Rebel (mixtape) =

2025 album by EsDeeKid

Mixtape by EsDeeKid
- Released: 20 June 2025
- Genres: UK underground rap; UK rap; cloud rap; trap; jerk
- Length: 20:51
- Labels: XV; Lizzy
- Producer: Wraith9

Singles from Rebel
- 1. "LV Sandals" Released: 6 February 2025; 2. "Phantom" Released: 7 March 2025; 3. "4 Raws" Released: 20 June 2025; 4. "Cali Man" Released: 20 June 2025

Rebel is the debut mixtape by British rapper EsDeeKid. It was released through XV and Lizzy Records on 20 June 2025. It features guest appearances from fellow rappers Rico Ace, Fakemink, and Fimiguerrero, while its production was entirely handled by Wraith9.

Although considered a mixtape, Rebel became Spotify’s most streamed hip-hop album globally during November 2025. The mixtape has been credited with popularising the UK underground rap scene and introducing the Scouse accent to international listeners.

== Composition ==
Rebel is heavily influenced by EsDeeKid's experimental cloud rap sound, with elements of trap and jerk. Throughout the mixtape, the music is marked by synthesizers and reverb-heavy beats with 808s, while EsDeeKid raps about drug use, nightlife, and relationship woes.

== Critical reception ==
Professional ratings
Review scores
Source	Rating
AllMusic	3/5 stars
Pitchfork	6.6/10
Laut.de	4/5 stars

In a review for Pitchfork, Olivier Lafontant rated Rebel a 6.6 out of 10, writing that the mixtape gives only a small insight into EsDeeKid's true character, but sees him depict a heavy, "hard-nosed lifestyle of streetlit debauchery", making him one of the hottest faces of UK rap.

=== Year-end lists ===
Year-end lists
Publication	List	Rank	Ref.
Pitchfork	The 50 Best Albums of 2025	38	
Complex UK	Best Albums of 2025	8	
NME	Albums of the Year 2025	48	
Crack	The Top 50 Albums of 2025	2	
Complex	The 35 Best Hip-Hop Albums of 2025	26	

== Track listing ==
All tracks were produced by Wraith9.

Rebel track listing
No.	Title	Writer(s)	Length
1.	"4 Raws"	EsDeeKid; Harley "Wraith9" Riecansky	2:26
2.	"Cali Man" (with Rico Ace)	EsDeeKid; Rico Ace; Riecansky	1:48
3.	"Prague"	EsDeeKid; Riecansky; Cppo	1:37
4.	"Dirty"	EsDeeKid; Riecansky	1:45
5.	"LV Sandals" (with Fakemink and Rico Ace)	EsDeeKid; Vincenzo Camille; Rico Ace; Riecansky	1:51
6.	"Panic"	EsDeeKid; Riecansky	1:52
7.	"5am" (with Fimiguerrero)	EsDeeKid; Fimihan Akinola; Riecansky	2:01
8.	"Phantom" (with Rico Ace)	EsDeeKid; Rico Ace; Riecansky	1:49
9.	"Mist" (with Rico Ace)	EsDeeKid; Rico Ace; Riecansky	2:10
10.	"Rottweiler"	EsDeeKid; Riecansky	1:36
11.	"Tartan" (with Fimiguerrero)	EsDeeKid; Akinola; Riecansky	1:49
Total length:			20:51

== Charts ==
=== Weekly charts ===
Weekly chart performance for Rebel
Chart (2025–2026)	Peak position
Australian Albums (ARIA)	13
Australian Hip Hop/R&B Albums (ARIA)	2
Austrian Albums (Ö3 Austria)	8
Belgian Albums (Ultratop Flanders)	22
Belgian Albums (Ultratop Wallonia)	77
Canadian Albums (Billboard)	12
Czech Albums (ČNS IFPI)	4
Danish Albums (Hitlisten)	20
Dutch Albums (Album Top 100)	18
Finnish Albums (Suomen virallinen lista)	10
French Albums (SNEP)	110
German Albums (Offizielle Top 100)	18
German Hip-Hop Albums (Offizielle Top 100)	2
Hungarian Albums (MAHASZ)	6
Irish Albums (Official Charts)	11
Irish Independent Albums (IRMA)	1
Lithuanian Albums (AGATA)	1
Norwegian Albums (IFPI Norge)	11
Polish Albums (ZPAV)	4
Portuguese Albums (AFP)	22
Scottish Albums (Official Charts)	9
Spanish Albums (PROMUSICAE)	94
Swedish Albums (Sverigetopplistan)	12
Swedish Hip-Hop Albums (Sverigetopplistan)	1
Swiss Albums (Schweizer Hitparade)	6
UK Albums (Official Charts)	8
UK Independent Albums (Official Charts)	3
UK R&B Albums (Official Charts)	1
US Billboard 200	23
US Independent Albums (Billboard)	3
US Top R&B/Hip-Hop Albums (Billboard)	5

=== Year-end charts ===
Year-end chart performance for Rebel
Chart (2025)	Position
Icelandic Albums (Tónlistinn)	90

== Certifications ==
Certifications for Rebel
Region	Certification	Certified units/sales
Denmark (IFPI Danmark)	Gold	10,000^{‡}
United Kingdom (BPI)	Gold	100,000^{‡}
^{‡} Sales+streaming figures based on certification alone.
