= Sinn6r =

British rapper

- Born: Thai Sinclair; 2005 (age 20–21)
- Origin: London, England
- Genres: UK Underground; drill; rage; trap
- Occupations: Rapper; record producer
- Years active: 2019-present
- Labels: Lizzy; XV
- Website: https://www.sinn6r.co.uk/

Thai Sinclair (born 2005), known professionally as Sinn6r (stylized in uppercase), is a British rapper and record producer from South East London, England. Associated with the UK underground rap scene, his music has been characterised as featuring "trap-inspired hellscapes" and cadences influenced by American drill music.

Sinn6r has been credited with popularising the use of sliding 808s in the UK underground rap scene with his studio album #FEDERAL, building on a technique initially developed by 808Melo. He has collaborated with artists such as Lancey Foux, EsDeeKid and Rico Ace, and is signed to Lizzy Records.

== Career ==
Sinn6r released his debut studio album, 2Often, in July 2025.The project is characterised by Opium-inspired production, which has been compared to the Draco collective.

Later in November 2025, he released his second studio album, #FEDERAL, under XV Records.The production was managed by Zoja, Cppo and electronic musician, Varg²™, with features from Rico Ace, TeeboFG and Ledbyher. In a review for Pitchfork, the project was awarded an 8.0/10, commending its progression and vocal execution. This was followed by a deluxe edition titled #FEDERAL++ released in March 2026, which included four additional tracks with a feature from Lancey Foux on the single "Pattern". On 27 October 2026, Sinn6r joined 1300Saint for a recording session following the latter's debut headline show in London.

== Artistry ==
British magazine Dazed noted Sinn6r as drawing from "a broad church of references", including the likes of David Bowie, Skrillex and $uicide Boy$.

Lyrically, Sinn6r often delivers narratives that juxtapose street crime and vulnerability with themes of substance abuse and personal hardships, which he delivers over deadpan but dextrous flows while matching the abrasive, bass-heavy distortion of the beats.

== Discography ==
=== Studio albums ===
Title	Details
2Often	Released: 11 July 2025; Label: XV Records; Formats: Digital download, streaming
#FEDERAL	Released: 21 November 2025; Label: XV Records and Lizzy Records; Formats: Digital download, streaming
#FEDERAL++ (Deluxe)	Released: 12 March 2026; Label: XV Records and Lizzy Records; Formats: Digital download, streaming
