= Fakemink =

British rapper and producer (born 2005)

- Fakemink in 2026

Background information
- Also known as: 9090gate; gatevisions; londonssaviour; Etna
- Born: Vincenzo Nischal Camille Bhatia; 29 January 2005 (age 21); Ilford, East London, England
- Origin: London, England
- Genres: Cloud rap; UK underground rap
- Occupations: Rapper; record producer
- Years active: 2020–present
- Label: EtnaVeraVela

Vincenzo Nischal Camille Bhatia (born 29 January 2005), known professionally as Fakemink (stylised in lowercase) and previously 9090gate, is a British rapper and producer. He has been credited with popularising the UK underground rap scene.

His notable releases include the viral single "Easter Pink", his debut mixtape, London's Saviour, as well as the EP The Boy Who Cried Terrified. His debut studio album, Terrified, released on 22 May 2026.

== Early life ==
Vincenzo Nischal Camille Bhatia was born on 29 January 2005 in Ilford, East London and was raised there subsequently until the age of 5. After which, his family moved to the town of Basildon in Essex. He is of Indian Punjabi and Algerian descent. He began making music in FL Studio when he was nine years old, on a pirated version of FL Studio from his father's hard drive.

== Career ==
Camille began his career under the name 9090gate; his first track on Spotify, "Tropical Remix", was a collaborative effort with fellow British rapper EsDeeKid and was listed to have been released August 19th 2024.

Camille released his debut mixtape, London's Saviour, on 22 December 2023, shortly before adopting the stage name Fakemink. In 2024, he released over fifty singles. His 2025 single "Easter Pink" went viral and Pitchfork described it as "Bloghouse meets cloud rap."

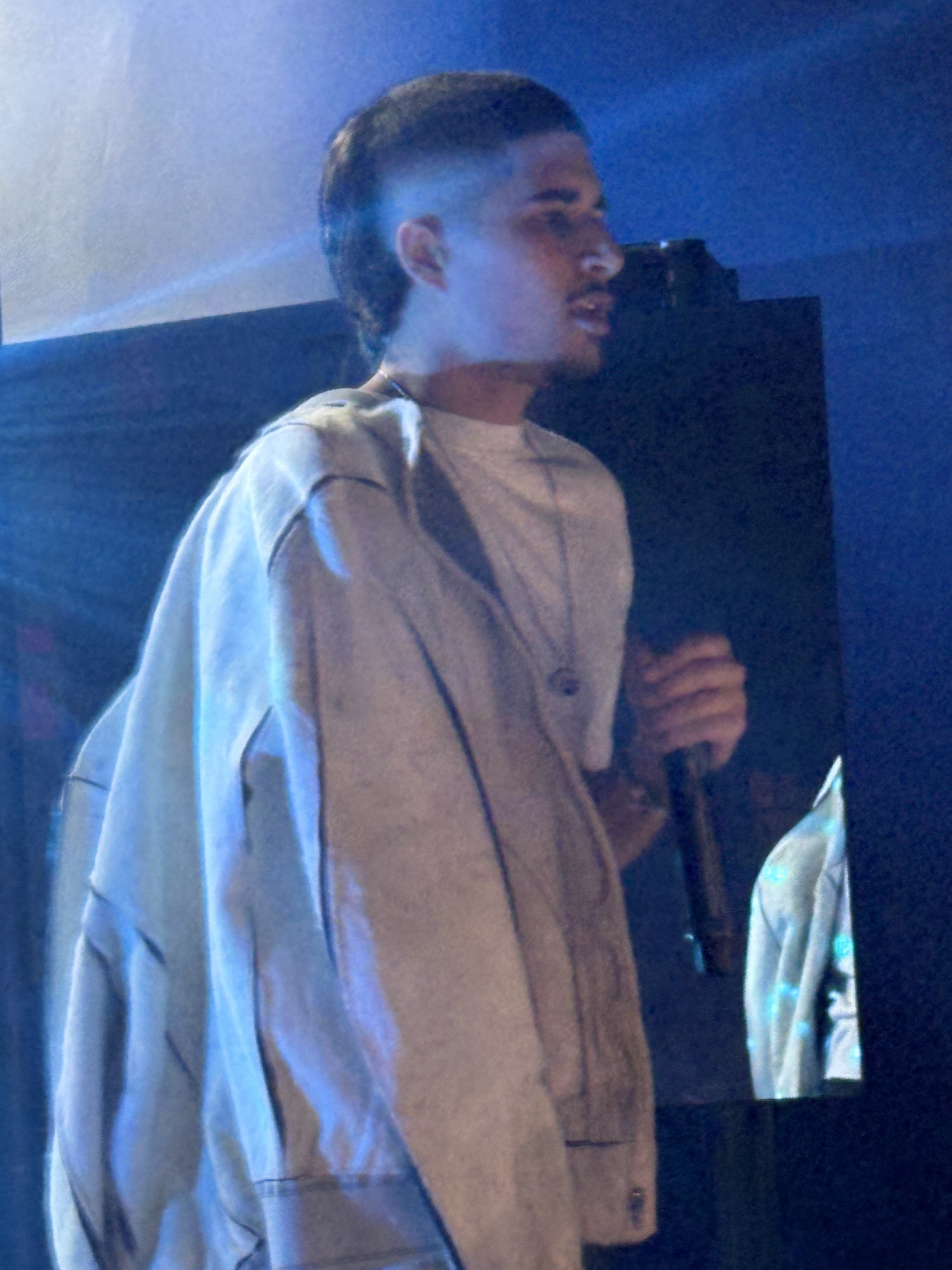
Fakemink performing at The Mod Club in Toronto, September 2025

On 12 July 2025, Canadian rapper Drake brought out Fakemink as a surprise guest at the Wireless Festival in London. Following his appearance, he was recognised by other musicians such as Clairo, Yung Lean, Yeat, Frank Ocean, and actor Timothée Chalamet. Fakemink was a friend of American rapper Nettspend and was set to release some collaborative work in the future, but he released a speculated diss track towards Nettspend on 6 October, titled "Look At Me", following an online conflict. On 14 October, Playboi Carti brought out Fakemink at the Crypto.com Arena during the former's Antagonist Tour. On 17 November, Fakemink was featured in a Supreme x True Religion Fall/Winter 2025 campaign. Fakemink also performed at Camp Flog Gnaw 2025 that same month.

An EP preceding his album Terrified, The Boy Who Cried Terrified, was released on 29 January 2026, Fakemink's 21st birthday. On 27 February, Fakemink made his fashion show debut with Gucci in Milan, with rappers such as Nettspend, Feng, and EsDeeKid, amongst others. Fakemink embarked on his North American and European "A Terrible Beauty" tour from April to July 2026 in support of his album Terrified. On 10 April 2026, Fakemink made his debut at Coachella 2026 where he performed at the Gobi Tent. Fakemink made his debut at Rolling Loud 2026 on 9 May 2026. His album Terrified (stylised as Terrified .) was released on 22 May 2026.

== Influences and artistry ==
Fakemink's music has been described as a "mellowed" version of the jerk microgenre, although he does not consider himself part of it. He describes Dean Blunt as the "best artist of all time". He also cites the drums from Drake's 2011 song "Headlines" as a major early influence. Fakemink's other influences include Imogen Heap, Kanye West, Yung Lean, Xaviersobased, Phreshboyswag, Drake, James Blunt, and The Futureheads. Wendela Rang of New Wave Magazine called Fakemink "The New Prince of Digital Nostalgia".

== Personal life ==
Camille is Muslim. He has said he abstains from alcohol both due to religious adherence and because he does not find it enjoyable.

== Discography ==
=== Studio albums ===
Title	Details	Peak chart positions		
Title	Details	AUS	IRE Indie	NZ
Terrified	Released: 22 May 2026; Label: EtnaVeraVela; Formats: CD, vinyl, digital download	90	16	40

=== Mixtapes ===
Title	Details
London's Saviour	Released: 22 December 2023; Label: EtnaVeraVela; Formats: Digital download

=== Extended plays ===
Title	Details
real hospitality	Released: 10 February 2023; Label: EtnaVeraVela; Formats: Digital download
Wild One	Released: 5 April 2024; Label: EtnaVeraVela; Formats: Digital download
Furever	Released: 10 June 2024; Label: EtnaVeraVela; Formats: Digital download
The Boy Who Cried Terrified	Released: 29 January 2026; Label: EtnaVeraVela; Formats: Digital download

=== Singles ===
List adapted from Apple Music.

Title	Year	Album
"Art House"	2022	Non-album singles
"AK58"	2022	Non-album singles
"Godiva"	2022	Non-album singles
"Oh Tina"	2023	Non-album singles
"9God"	2023	Non-album singles
"Hey"	2023	Non-album singles
"YM"	2023	Non-album singles
"Medicine"	2023	Non-album singles
"Freebase"	2023	Non-album singles
"Im Just Bait"	2023	Non-album singles
"Hi, I'm Blessed"	2023	Non-album singles
"Die Till You Live"	2023	Non-album singles
"Me and Rosh"	2024	Non-album singles
"Not Today"	2024	Non-album singles
"Fur Coat Life"	2024	Non-album singles
"RS11"	2024	Non-album singles
"Heartbroken"	2024	Non-album singles
"Little"	2024	Non-album singles
"I'm So Peng"	2024	Non-album singles
"Mink"	2024	Non-album singles
"Same Mistakes"	2024	Non-album singles
"Amnesia"	2024	Non-album singles
"Exotic Pop"	2024	Non-album singles
"Laced"	2024	Non-album singles
"Apples and Pears"	2024	Non-album singles
"London Pound Cake"	2024	Non-album singles
"In Smoke, We Trust"	2024	Non-album singles
"Orchid" (with Fimiguerrero)	2024	Non-album singles
"Zealousy"	2024	Non-album singles
"Nobody"	2024	Non-album singles
"Bhad Bhabie 2"	2024	Non-album singles
"Dust Freestyle"	2024	Non-album singles
"Lemon"	2024	Non-album singles
"Chipped Tooth Ballerinas"	2024	Non-album singles
"Ragebait"	2024	Non-album singles
"Wookies"	2024	Non-album singles
"Catty"	2024	Non-album singles
"Plush" (with Rada)	2024	Non-album singles
"Slurricane" (with EsDeeKid)	2024	Non-album singles
"Can't Let Go"	2024	Non-album singles
"Pink Picasso"	2024	Non-album singles
"Scary Life"	2024	Non-album singles
"Sniffany"	2024	Non-album singles
"Tropical Freestyle"	2024	Non-album singles
"Plum Freestyle"	2024	Non-album singles
"Youngest in Charge"	2024	Non-album singles
"Royal"	2024	Non-album singles
"Sour"	2024	Non-album singles
"Posh Thot"	2024	Non-album singles
"Thank God"	2024	Non-album singles
"Spend Money Lie"	2024	Non-album singles
"Deja Vu"	2024	Non-album singles
"Lemon Cherry Escort"	2024	Non-album singles
"I Kno"	2024	Non-album singles
"Disco Biscuit"	2024	Non-album singles
"Crush" (with ok)	2024	Non-album singles
"Ooh" (with GhostInnaFurCoat)	2024	Non-album singles
"Die Today"	2024	Non-album singles
"Shih Tzu" (with Xaviersobased)	2024	Non-album singles
"Oreoz"	2024	Non-album singles
"Secret"	2024	Non-album singles
"Brat"	2024	Non-album singles
"LVMH"	2024	Non-album singles
"Cats"	2024	Non-album singles
"So Blown"	2024	Non-album singles
"Dont Look Back"	2024	Non-album singles
"Nah #Freestyle"	2024	Non-album singles
"Cant Stop"	2024	Non-album singles
"No License"	2024	Non-album singles
"Ibiza"	2024	Non-album singles
"pj"	2024	Non-album singles
"Bite My Lip"	2024	Non-album singles
"Givenchy"	2024	Non-album singles
"Colder"	2024	Non-album singles
"PillowFight" (with ok)	2024	Non-album singles
"No Thanks"	2024	Non-album singles
"Training"	2024	Non-album singles
"Naughty or Nice"	2024	Non-album singles
"Bambi"	2024	Non-album singles
"Kacey Lola"	2025	Non-album singles
"War Clothes"	2025	Non-album singles
"Easter Pink"	2025	Non-album singles
"Receipt" (with wasse)	2025	Non-album singles
"I'm Dead"	2025	Non-album singles
"Face to Face"	2025	Non-album singles
"Milk"	2025	Non-album singles
"Music and Me"	2025	Non-album singles
"Makka" (with Ecco2k and Mechatok)	2025	Non-album singles
"Under Your Skin"	2025	Non-album singles
"Snow White"	2025	Non-album singles
"Braces"	2025	Non-album singles
"Fever" (with Buckshot)	2025	Non-album singles
"Crying"	2025	Non-album singles
"Punch"	2025	Non-album singles
"Look at Me"	2025	Non-album singles
"Fidelio"	2025	Non-album singles
"Black Jeep" (with Fimiguerrero)	2025	Non-album singles
"Night, Blooming, Jasmine"	2026	Terrified
"Burn It"(with ok)	2026	Non-album singles
"Love Is a Dog from Hell"	2026	Non-album singles
"Bye Bye"	2026	Non-album singles
"Love of the Game 3"	2026	Non-album singles
"One 2 Many"	2026	Non-album singles
"Chiltern Firehouse" (with Skepta)	2026	Non-album singles

== Tours ==
=== Headlining ===
- A Terrible Beauty Tour (2026)
